= Garden State Parkway =

Toll road in New Jersey, US

Garden State Parkway
- Garden State Parkway highlighted in green

Route information
- Maintained by NJTA
- Length: 172.40 mi (277.45 km)
- Existed: June 29, 1950–present
- History: Completed 1956; NY extension completed 1957
- Component highways: Route 444 (unsigned) entire length
- Tourist routes: Pine Barrens Byway
- Restrictions: No trucks north of exit 105; all trucks over 13"- 11" must exit at exit 29

Major junctions
- South end: Route 109 in Lower Township
- US 40 / US 322 in Egg Harbor Township; A.C. Expressway in Egg Harbor Township; US 30 in Galloway Township; I-195 / Route 138 / Route 34 in Wall Township; US 9 / Route 440 in Woodbridge Township; I-95 Toll / N.J. Turnpike in Woodbridge Township; US 1 in Woodbridge Township; I-78 in Hillside; I-280 / CR 508 / CR 509 in East Orange; I-80 / CR 67 in Saddle Brook
- North end: G.S. Parkway Connector at the New York state line in Montvale

Location
- Country: United States
- State: New Jersey
- Counties: Cape May, Atlantic, Burlington, Ocean, Monmouth, Middlesex, Union, Essex, Passaic, Bergen

Highway system
- New Jersey State Highway Routes; Interstate; US; State; Scenic Byways
- New Jersey Turnpike Authority
← Route 440	444	→ Route 445

The Garden State Parkway (GSP) is a controlled-access toll road that stretches the north–south length of eastern New Jersey from the state's southernmost tip near Cape May north to the New York state line at Montvale. Its name refers to New Jersey's nickname, the "Garden State". The parkway has an unsigned reference number of Route 444 by the New Jersey Department of Transportation (NJDOT). At its north end, the road becomes the Garden State Parkway Connector, a component of the New York State Thruway system that connects to the Thruway mainline in Ramapo, New York.

The Garden State Parkway is the longest highway in the state at approximately 172 miles (277 km), and, according to the International Bridge, Tunnel and Turnpike Association, was the busiest toll road in the United States in 2006. Most of the highway north of the Raritan River runs through heavily populated areas. Between the Raritan River and Toms River, the highway passes through lighter suburban development, while south of Toms River, the road mostly runs through unspoiled wilderness in the Pine Barrens and swampland, interspersed with small towns and Jersey Shore beach communities. The highway has a posted speed limit of 65 miles per hour (105 km/h) for most of its length and is primarily for passenger vehicle use; trucks weighing over 10,000 pounds (4,500 kg) are prohibited north of exit 105.

The parkway was constructed between 1946 and 1957 to connect suburban Northern New Jersey with the Jersey Shore resort areas along the Atlantic coast and to alleviate traffic on traditional north–south routes running through each town center, such as U.S. Route 1 (US 1), US 9 and Route 35. During planning and construction of the first segment, the road was to be a toll-free highway designated as the Route 4 Parkway. However, a lack of funding caused the remainder of the parkway to be built as a toll road. The highway has seen many improvements over the years, including the addition and reconstruction of interchanges, bridge replacements, widening of the roadway, and removal of at-grade intersections. Previously, the road had been maintained by an agency known as the New Jersey Highway Authority, however in 2003, the agency merged into the New Jersey Turnpike Authority (NJTA), which now maintains the parkway along with the New Jersey Turnpike.

The parkway uses an open system of toll collection with flat-fee tolls collected at 11 toll plazas along the roadway, as well as at several entrances and exits. Tolls can be paid using cash or via the E-ZPass electronic toll collection system. Along the route are 11 service areas, providing food and fuel to travelers. Historically, the road had ten picnic areas along its length, but only one remains open today.

== Route description ==
Route 444 shield, the Parkway's unsigned designation.

The Garden State Parkway begins at New Jersey Route 109 in Cape May County, at one of the very few expressway interchanges in the United States designated as Exit 0. It runs north along the mainland side of the Jersey Shore, crossing the Great Egg Harbor Bay and passing to the west of Atlantic City. The parkway passes through the sparsely populated Pine Barrens until it reaches Toms River in Ocean County. From here, the road heads into suburban areas. North of Tinton Falls, the route splits into a local-express lane configuration, which it maintains through Sayreville. Here, the highway crosses the Raritan River into Woodbridge Township, where it meets the New Jersey Turnpike (Interstate 95, I-95). North of here, the Garden State Parkway passes through densely populated communities in Middlesex and Union counties and intersects I-78 near Newark. The parkway eventually passes to the south and east of Paterson and meets I-80 in Saddle Brook. After traversing the suburban northern section of Bergen County, the road enters the state of New York where it becomes the Garden State Parkway Connector, continuing north to the New York State Thruway mainline.

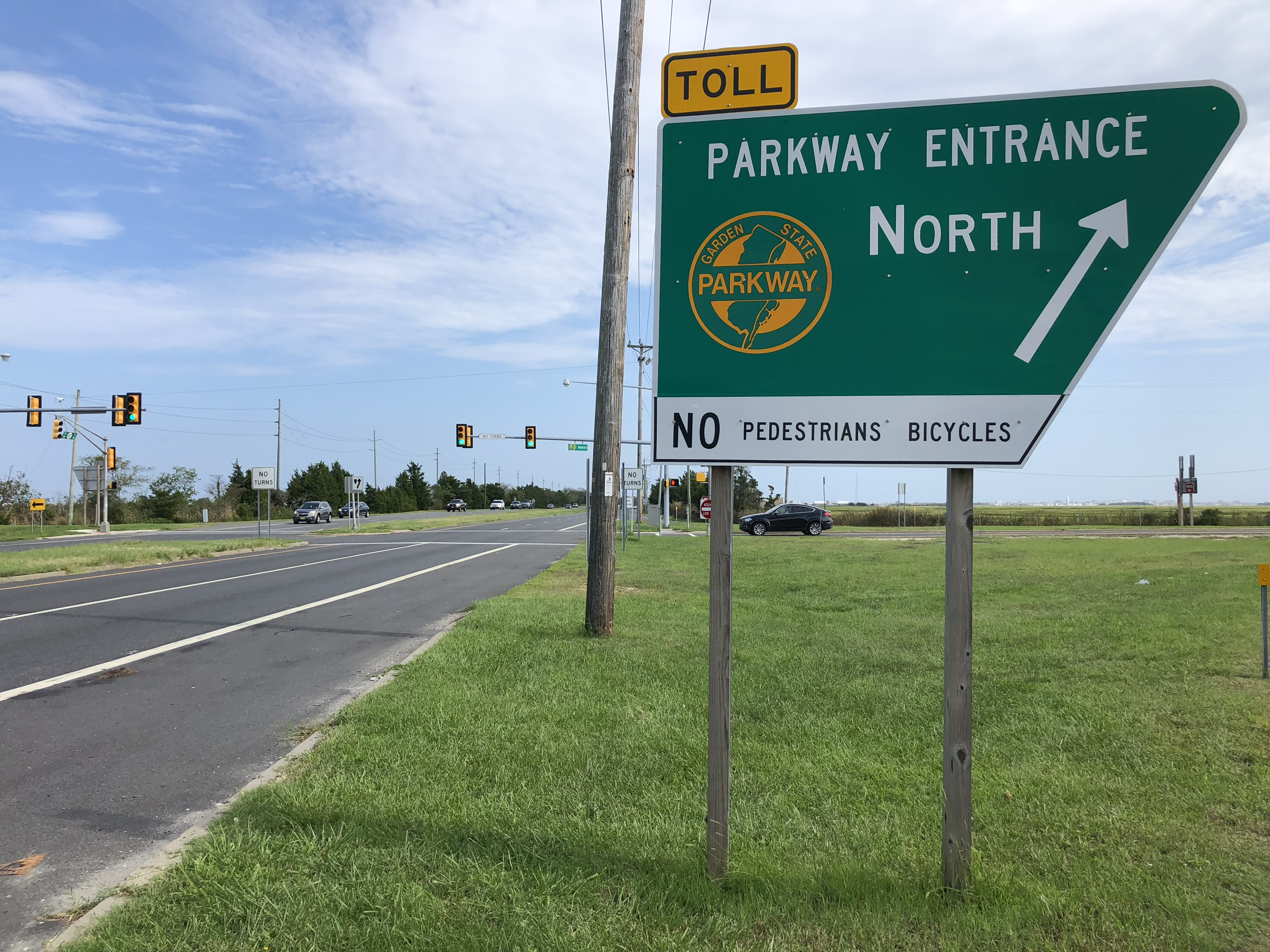
Typical entrance sign for the parkway

The parkway serves as a major route connecting North Jersey with all of the state's shore points, and as such, is subject to frequent congestion. The number of lanes on the parkway ranges from four in Cape May, Atlantic, and Bergen counties, to 15 on the Driscoll Bridge. Much of the highway runs closely parallel to, or concurrently with US 9. The speed limit on the parkway is 65 mph (105 km/h) for most of its length. However, it is posted at 55 mph (90 km/h) on a five-mile (8.0 km) section near Toms River and on a 40-mile (64 km) section between Sayreville and Paramus. The NJTA may temporarily reduce the speed limit when special hazards exist. Commercial trucks with a registered weight of over 10,000 pounds (4,500 kg) are not allowed to use the parkway north of exit 105, just past the Asbury Park Toll Plaza. The entire length of the Garden State Parkway carries the unsigned designation of Route 444, and is part of the National Highway System, a network of roads important to the country's economy, defense, and mobility.

=== Cape May and Atlantic counties ===
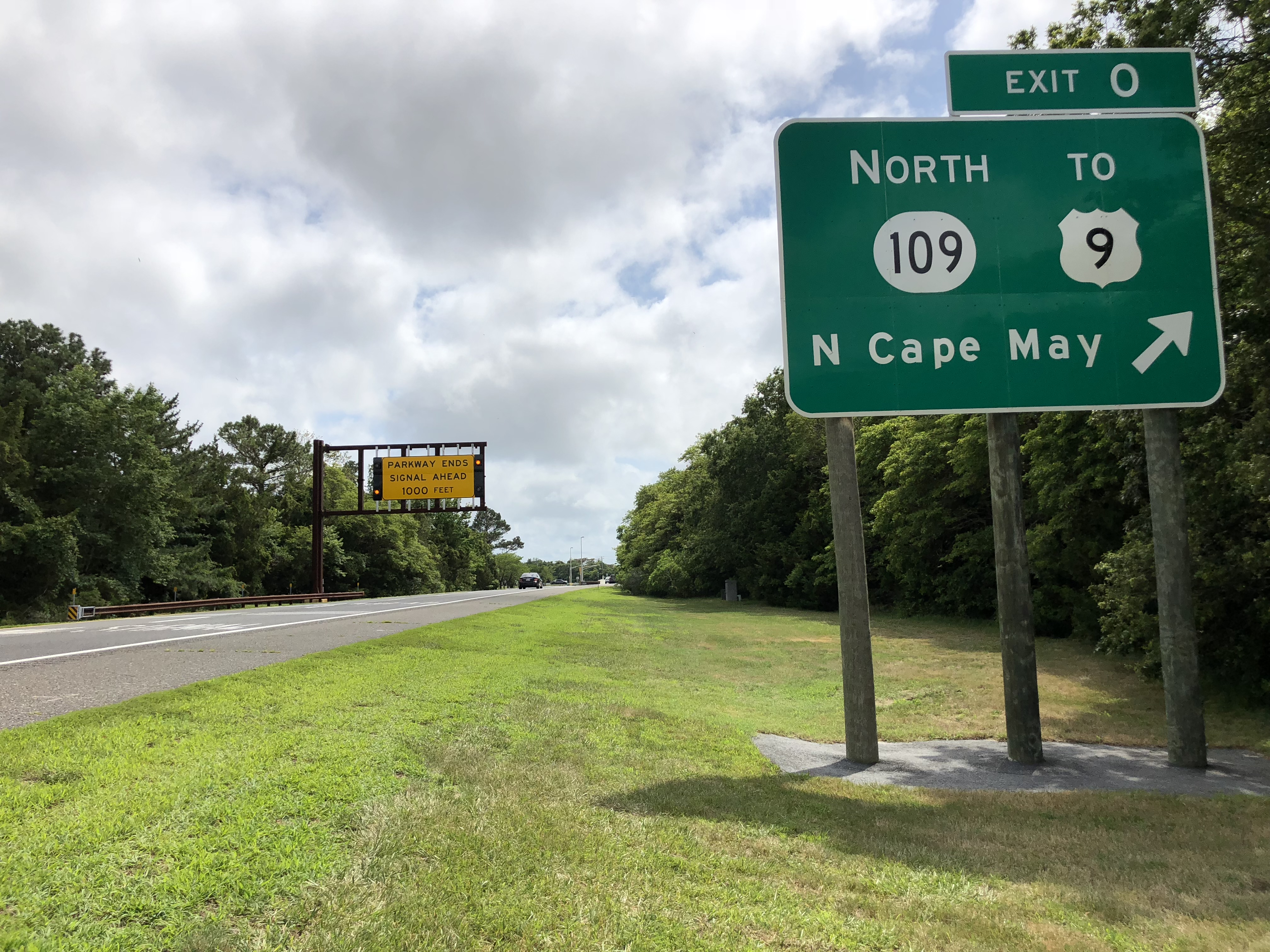
Garden State Parkway southbound, approaching the southern terminus at Route 109 in Lower Township

The parkway begins at an at-grade intersection with Route 109 in Lower Township, Cape May County, where Route 109 continues south toward Cape May and west (north) toward US 9 and the Cape May–Lewes Ferry. The Garden State Parkway runs north as a four-lane freeway on the Cape May Peninsula through the Cape Island Wildlife Management Area, running west of swampland, separating the highway from the Jersey Shore communities. Trees occupy the median and the sides of the road for the next several miles. After passing to the east of Cape May National Golf Club, crossing over Jones Creek, and passing a pond in the median, the highway enters Middle Township and has an interchange with Route 47, which serves The Wildwoods resort area and the community of Rio Grande. North of this point, the parkway crosses over the abandoned Wildwood Branch of the Pennsylvania-Reading Seashore Lines, and afterwards, the trees in the median disappear and the highway has a partial interchange with Route 147, which provides access to North Wildwood, Whitesboro, and Burleigh. Crossing into the county seat of Cape May Court House, the median narrows and U.S. Route 9 appears within yards of the southbound lanes of the parkway as it passes west of The Shore Club golf course. The two highways then split apart and the Garden State Parkway bisects residential areas before reaching an interchange for Stone Harbor Boulevard (CR 657), which serves Cape May Court House, the Cape Regional Medical Center, and Stone Harbor.

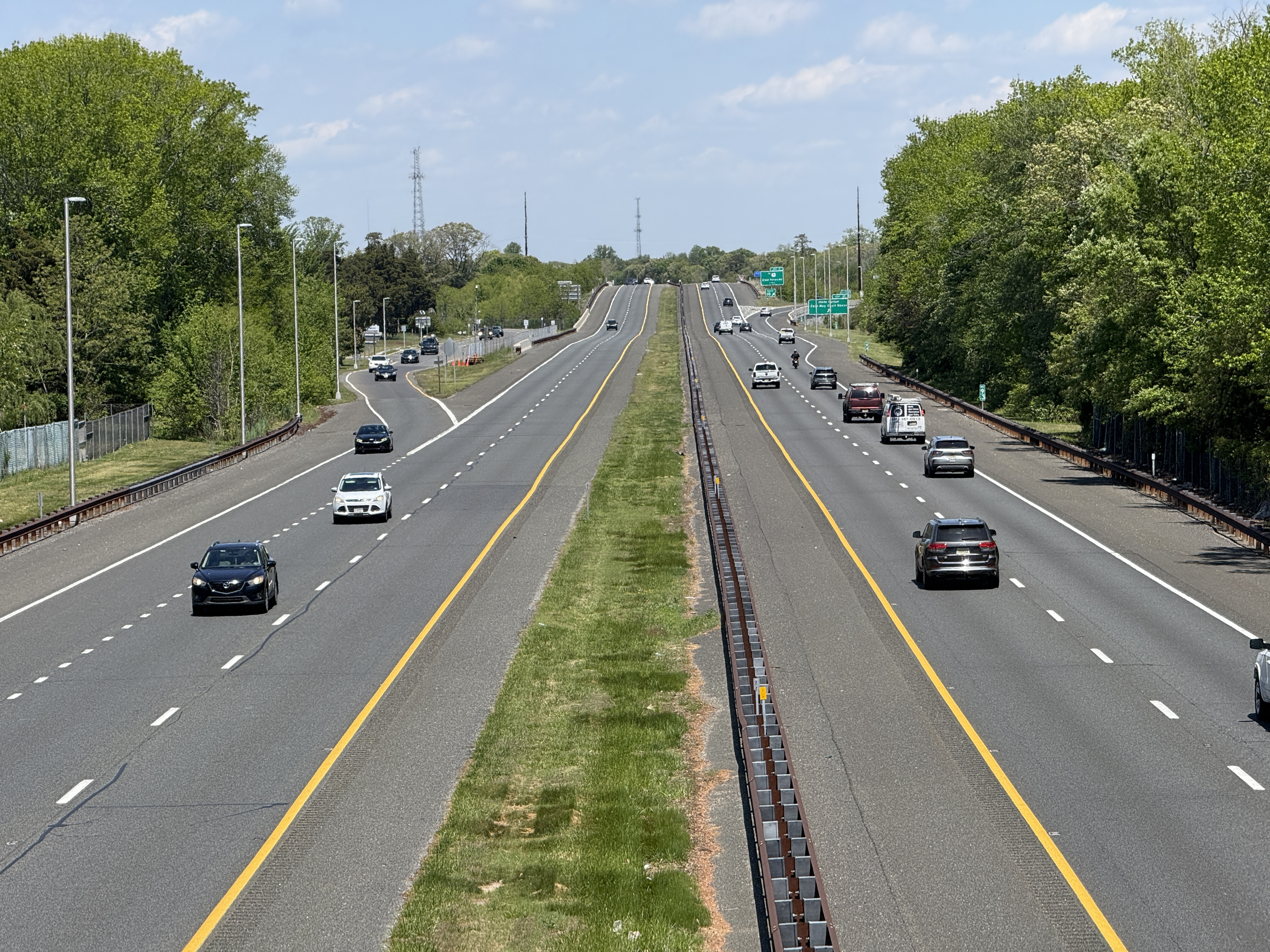
Garden State Parkway northbound in Cape May Court House

Past this point, the road comes to an interchange for Crest Haven Road (CR 609), which provides access to the Cape May County Park & Zoo and a building complex containing the Cape May County Technical School District. After a southbound entrance ramp from U.S. Route 9, the parkway leaves Cape May Court House and returns to a desolate wooded setting with a wide tree-filled median. Continuing north, the parkway has an interchange with Avalon Boulevard (CR 601), serving Avalon and Swainton. North of this point, the highway enters Dennis Township and has a partial interchange with Sea Isle Boulevard (CR 625), serving Sea Isle City before reaching the Bruce Willis Service Area in the median. Past the service area, the parkway enters Upper Township and reaches the Cape May Toll Plaza northbound immediately before meeting the southern terminus of Route 50, which serves Seaville, at a partial interchange. After passing east of several homes and a golf course, the parkway has the John B. Townsend Shoemaker Holly Picnic Area in the median before it crosses over the abandoned Pennsylvania-Reading Seashore Lines Ocean City Branch. Continuing north, the highway comes to a diamond interchange with U.S. Route 9 and Roosevelt Boulevard (CR 623), which serves Ocean City and Marmora. North of this exit, U.S. Route 9 begins to run concurrently with the Garden State Parkway, and the two routes run east of the community of Beesleys Point before the median narrows, and they cross the Great Egg Harbor Bay on the Great Egg Harbor Bridge.

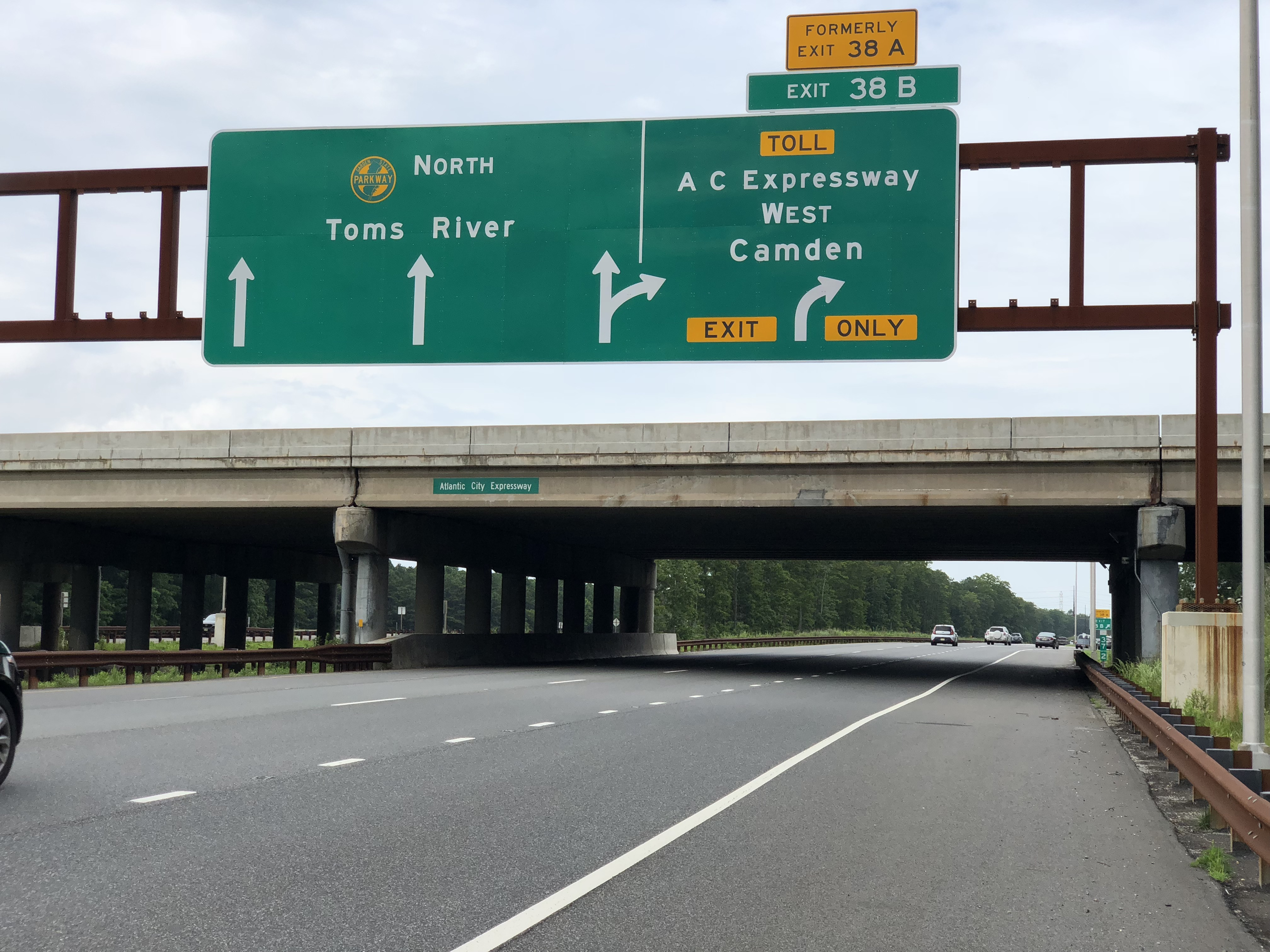
Garden State Parkway northbound at the Atlantic City Expressway in Egg Harbor Township

The highway surfaces into Somers Point, Atlantic County, where the southbound roadway has the Great Egg Toll Plaza before U.S. Route 9 leaves the parkway at a partial junction. Past this point, the median widens and the parkway passes west of the Greate Bay Country Club and some homes before a partial interchange with West Laurel Drive, which provides access to Somers Point and Ocean City. After passing to the west of more residences, the median briefly becomes a Jersey barrier as the route crosses the Patcong Creek into Egg Harbor Township, where developments begin to appear on the west side of the highway. Eventually, the parkway crosses into uninhabited areas again before heading into a commercial area and widening to six lanes. Here, the road has an interchange with Black Horse Pike (US 40/US 322) and Tilton Road (County Route 563, CR 563), marking the first of three interchanges with roads that serve Atlantic City, located to the east. The median then transitions to a Jersey barrier and the parkway passes over the abandoned Pennsylvania-Reading Seashore Lines Newfield Branch before a partial interchange with Washington Avenue (CR 608) and a cloverleaf interchange with the controlled-access Atlantic City Expressway (which heads west towards Philadelphia), where the northbound and southbound roadways split apart again. Upon leaving the commercial area, the highway passes to the east of Atlantic City International Airport and crosses over a flume of the Atlantic City Reservoir, which has a basin on each side of the highway. Continuing north, the highway enters Galloway Township and passes over NJ Transit's Atlantic City Line before it comes to a partial interchange with White Horse Pike (US 30), serving Absecon. North of this exit, the median is home to the Frank Sinatra Service Area, which also has a barrack of the New Jersey State Police. Immediately north of the service area, the parkway has an interchange with Jimmie Leeds Road (CR 561), serving the community of Pomona. The parkway then enters the sparsely populated Pine Barrens, passing to the east of Stockton University and reaching an interchange with Pomona Road (CR 575/CR 561 Alt.) Past this point, the road turns northeast and crosses into Port Republic as it winds north into the uninhabited Port Republic Wildlife Management Area. With some occasional development appearing along the sides of the road, the median narrows to a Jersey barrier as U.S. Route 9 merges back onto the parkway, along with the Pine Barrens Byway, and the three routes cross the Mullica River.

=== Burlington and Ocean counties ===
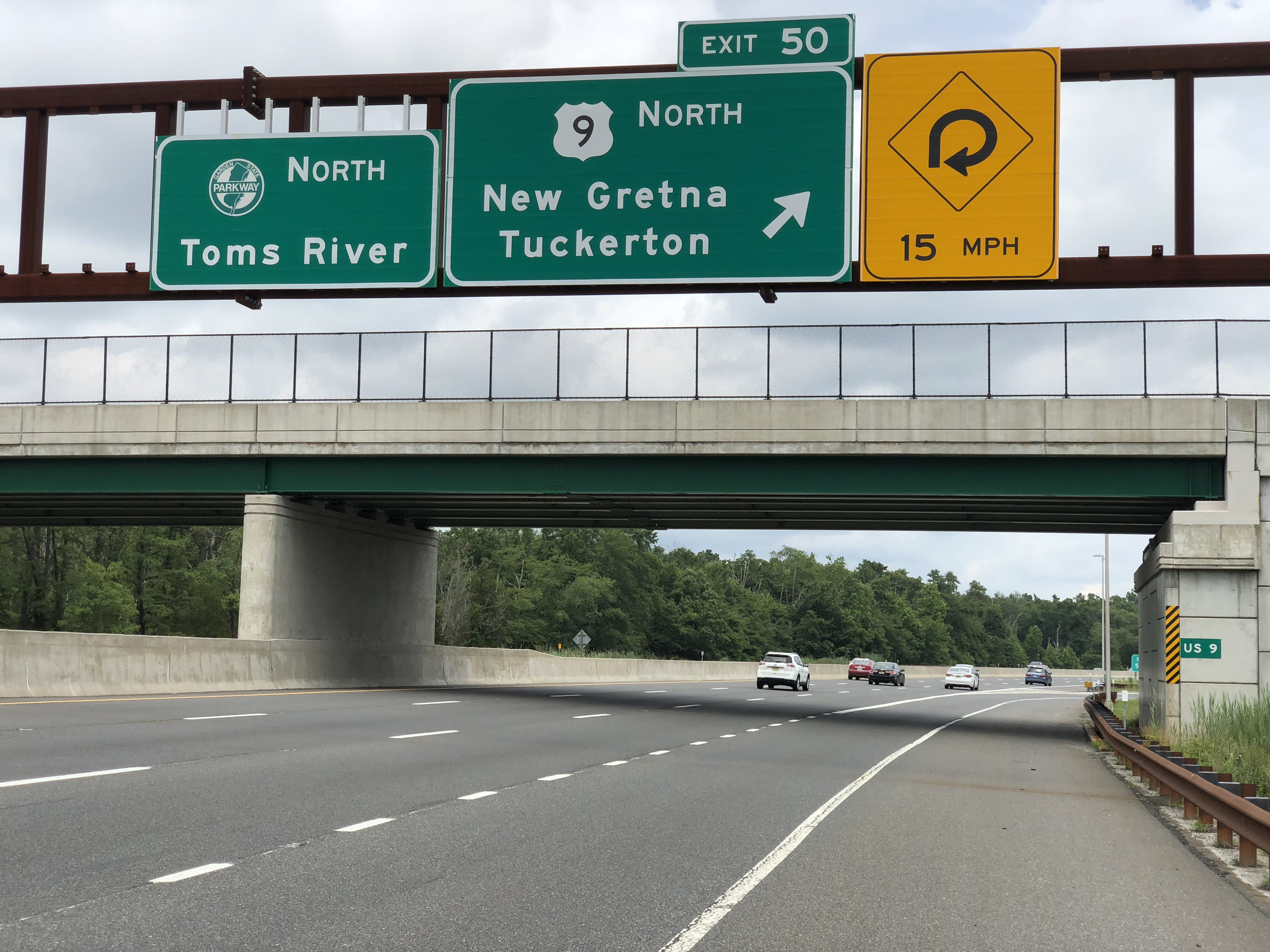
Garden State Parkway northbound at split with U.S. Route 9 in Bass River Township

The highway surfaces into Bass River Township, Burlington County, and U.S. Route 9 and the Pine Barrens Byway depart at a partial interchange. Continuing northeast past the community of New Gretna, the parkway passes over U.S. Route 9 with no access before crossing the Bass River and the median widens and contains a maintenance yard. Past this point, the median temporarily narrows again as the northbound lanes have the New Gretna Toll Plaza. Crossing northward through Bass River State Forest, the six-lane highway becomes desolate as it enters Little Egg Harbor Township, Ocean County. Here, the Garden State Parkway interchanges with North Green Street (CR 539), which serves Tuckerton, before entering Eagleswood, where it crosses over Westecunk Creek and passes to the west of Eagles Nest Airport. Afterwards, the parkway enters Stafford Township where development along the road begins to increase. Here, the highway has an interchange with Route 72, which provides access to Manahawkin and Long Beach Island. The parkway then forms a border between residential neighborhoods to the west and forest to the east before passing to the east of a golf course and entering Barnegat, where the concentration of houses shifts to the east. After an interchange with West Bay Avenue (CR 554), the parkway passes by residential neighborhoods on both sides of the highway before the median shortly narrows and the southbound roadway has the Barnegat Toll Plaza. Now in Ocean Township, the parkway meets the interchange with Wells Mills Road (CR 532) and crosses over Oyster Creek before entering Lacey Township, where it crosses the south, middle, and north branches of the Forked River before reaching an interchange with CR 614, serving the community of Forked River, and the Celia Cruz Service Area in the median.

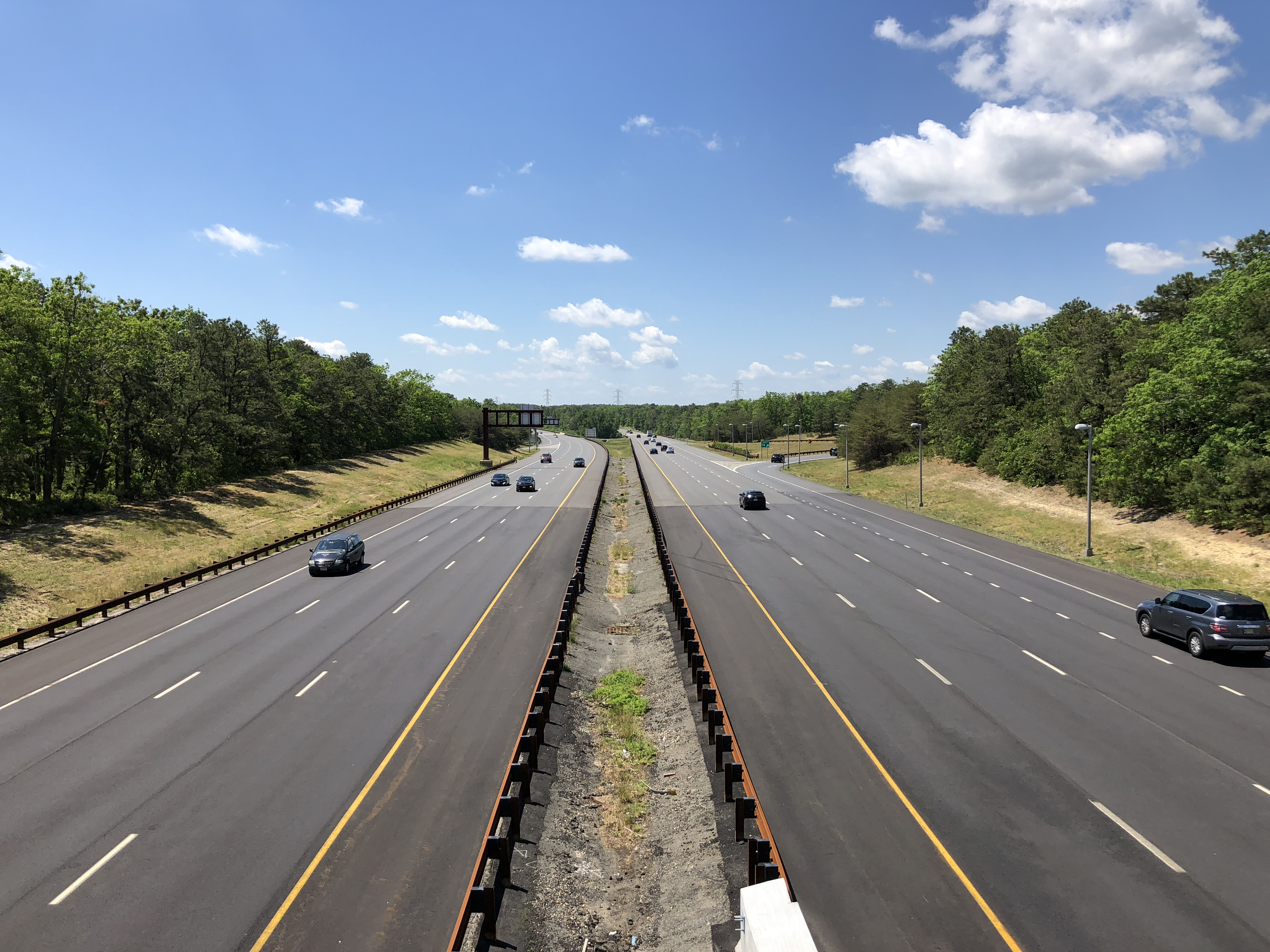
Garden State Parkway southbound at CR 614 in Lacey Township

Father north, the road crosses over Cedar Creek and enters Berkeley Township, passing west of a golf course and Central Regional High School while traversing Double Trouble State Park. The route then crosses into Beachwood and passes west of several homes before entering South Toms River, where the median narrows and the parkway becomes concurrently with U.S. Route 9 once again at an interchange with CR 530. After crossing the Toms River and entering Toms River, the highway passes west of the Toms River Bus Terminal serving NJ Transit buses. Past this point, the road crosses the abandoned Conrail Barnegat Branch and reaches an exit for Lakehurst Road (CR 527) before passing trees and reaching a cloverleaf interchange with Route 37, which provides access to Lakehurst, Seaside Heights, and Island Beach State Park. After heading northwest between trees on the west and neighborhoods on the east, the Garden State Parkway turns northeast as the median widens and contains a maintenance yard, and U.S. Route 9 leaves the parkway at an interchange with Route 166. Past the interchange, the parkway reaches the bi-directional Toms River Toll Plaza and passes by lighter suburban development in addition to parkland, with Ocean County College to the east. Upon entering Lakewood Township, the parkway has an interchange with Route 70, serving Brick Township and Point Pleasant to the east; this interchange also serves CR 528. Running along the border of Lakewood and Brick townships, the route has an interchange with CR 549 before crossing the South Branch of the Metedeconk River and passing over Route 88 with no access. Now entirely within Brick Township, the route crosses the North Branch of the Metedeconk River and reaches a second exit for CR 549, where a pedestrian bridge for the Brick Park & Ride, located to the east, passes over the parkway. North of this interchange, the road widens to eight lanes and passes west of a solar farm.

=== Monmouth and Middlesex counties ===
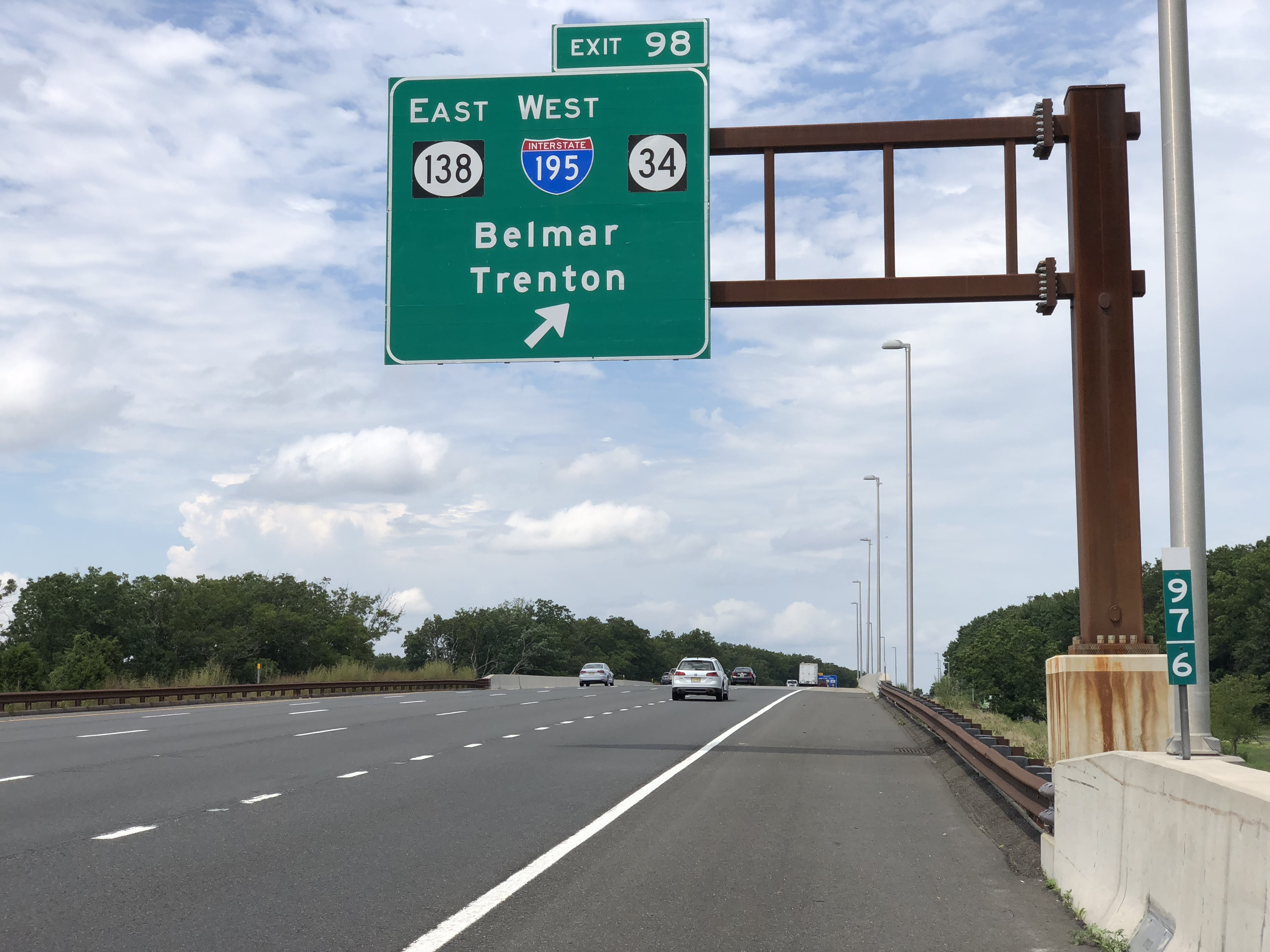
Garden State Parkway northbound at I-195, Route 138, and Route 34 in Wall Township

Upon entering Wall Township, Monmouth County, the southbound lanes have a truck inspection area and the parkway passes west of Brick Township Reservoir through woods. The parkway crosses the Manasquan River and passes under the Capital to Coast Trail before reaching a large interchange near Allaire State Park. The interchange includes a pair of collector-distributor roads and serves the eastern terminus of I-195 (which runs west across Central Jersey toward Trenton), Route 34 (which runs southeast toward Point Pleasant), and Route 138 (which runs east toward Belmar). A park and ride is present in the southeastern cloverleaf with Route 138. Passing to the west of Shark River Park, the median contains the Judy Blume Service Area, which provides a park and ride for commuters and access to Belmar Boulevard (CR 18). The parkway enters Tinton Falls and has exits for Route 33, which runs east toward Bradley Beach and west towards Freehold Township, and Route 66, which heads east towards Asbury Park. Soon afterwards, the parkway passes to the west of the Jersey Shore Premium Outlets and has a partial exit for Asbury Avenue (CR 16), where the road widens to ten lanes. North of this point, the parkway reaches the northbound Asbury Park Toll Plaza.

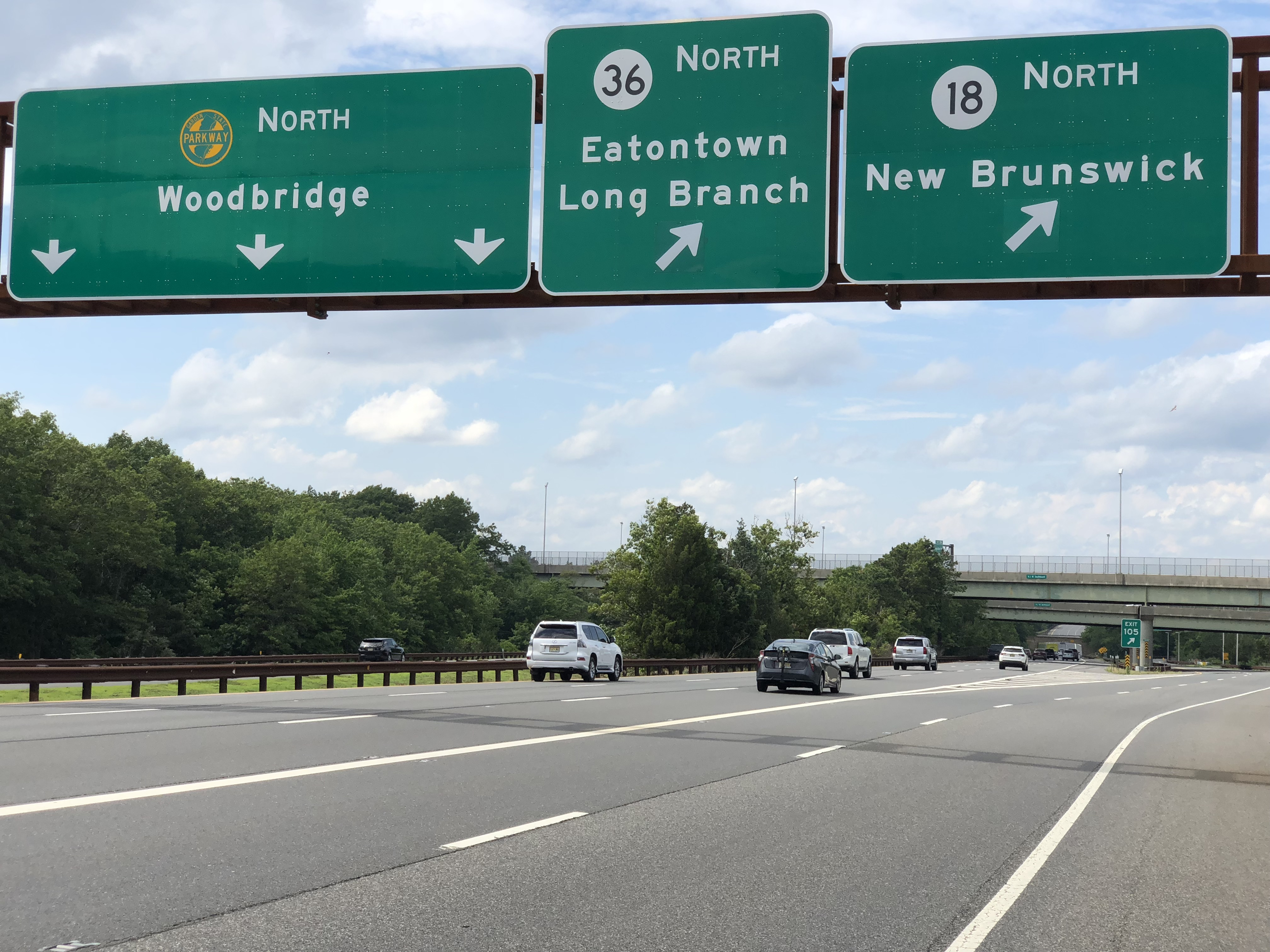
Garden State Parkway northbound at the interchange with Route 18 and Route 36 in Tinton Falls

Immediately north of the toll barrier, the road divides into a local-express lane configuration with two express and three local lanes in each direction. The parkway passes to the east of a solar farm before reaching an interchange with Route 18 and Route 36, which head north towards New Brunswick and east towards Long Branch, respectively. The connector road from the parkway to the western terminus of Route 36 and Hope Road (CR 51) is designated by the New Jersey Department of Transportation as Route 444S. North of the interchange, the Garden State Parkway passes over the Southern Secondary railroad line operated by the Delaware and Raritan River Railroad and bisects residential neighborhoods before crossing the Swimming River into Middletown Township, where the road has an interchange with CR 520, which contains a park and ride and serves Red Bank and Lincroft. The parkway then passes over Normandy Road, which serves as a road and railroad link between the two sections of Naval Weapons Station Earle. Continuing northwest past houses and parks, the route has an interchange with Red Hill Road (CR 52) as it enters Holmdel Township, where it serves the PNC Bank Arts Center and the New Jersey Vietnam Veterans' Memorial. Upon entering Hazlet, the parkway crosses NJ Transit's North Jersey Coast Line before reaching an interchange for Route 35 and Route 36, which serves Keyport. At this point, the express roadway in each direction gains a third lane. Immediately north of here is a southbound exit and entrance at Lloyd Road (CR 3), where the parkway briefly enters Aberdeen Township and passes over the Matawan Creek before crossing the North Jersey Coast Line for a second time while the southbound lanes of the parkway briefly enters Matawan. Upon entering Old Bridge Township, Middlesex County, and reaching an interchange for Matawan Road (CR 626) serving Matawan, the highway enters Cheesequake State Park.

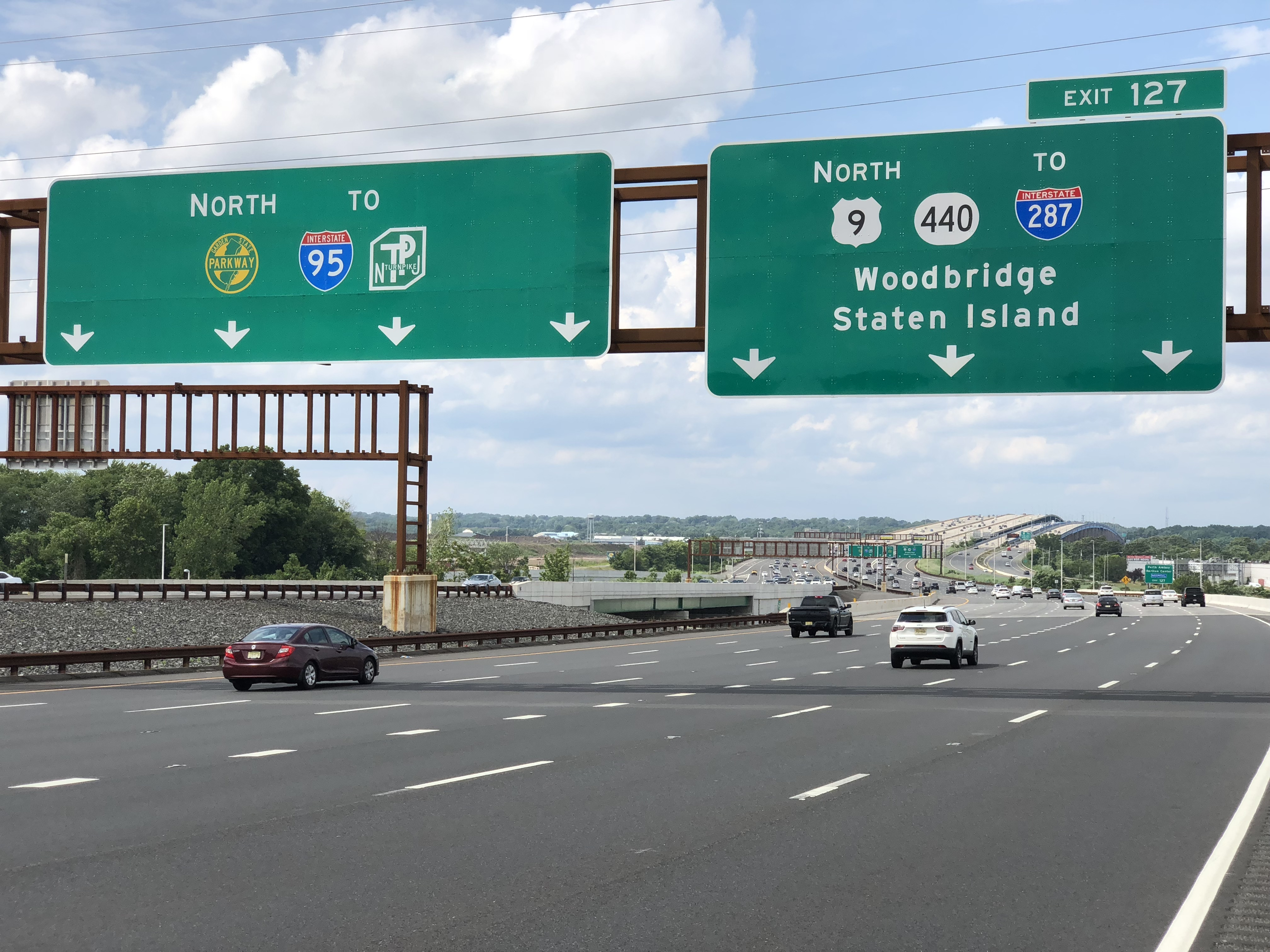
Garden State Parkway northbound approaching the Driscoll Bridge in Sayreville

After crossing the Cheesequake Creek near a marina and leaving the park, the road enters Sayreville and has the Jon Bon Jovi Service Area in the median, with access to both the express and local lanes of the highway. Passing to the southwest of South Amboy, the parkway has a partial interchange with U.S. Route 9 and passes over Conrail Shared Assets Operations' Amboy Secondary line. After a northbound entrance and southbound exit at Main Street (CR 670), the lanes, now as a 4-3-3-4 configuration, merge as they cross the abandoned Raritan River Railroad and reach the Raritan Toll Plaza southbound. North of the toll barrier is an exit for Chevalier Avenue; all southbound vehicles exiting here must have an E-ZPass transponder. Paralleling U.S. Route 9 and Route 35, the parkway becomes 15 lanes as it crosses the Raritan River on the Driscoll Bridge, the widest motor vehicle bridge in the world. On the bridge, the northbound lanes are divided into two roadways; only the eastern roadway has access to exit 127, an interchange for U.S. Route 9 and Route 440, providing access to the Outerbridge Crossing to Staten Island. Just north of exit 127 in Woodbridge Township, the parkway runs in between the northbound and southbound lanes of U.S. Route 9. After passing under Conrail Shared Assets Operations' Perth Amboy Running Track, U.S. Route 9 splits off to the east and the parkway reaches an interchange with the New Jersey Turnpike (I-95). Running northwest through Woodbridge as a ten-lane roadway, the highway has an interchange with US 1 and crosses under Conrail Shared Assets Operations' Port Reading Secondary line as it enters the community of Iselin, passing to the east of several corporate offices. Immediately after passing under Amtrak's Northeast Corridor east of the Metropark station serving Amtrak and NJ Transit's Northeast Corridor Line, the GSP has an interchange with Route 27, which serves Rahway to the northeast. North of this point, the parkway curves northeast through densely populated neighborhoods, passing the Colonia South and Colonia North service areas.

=== Union and Essex counties ===
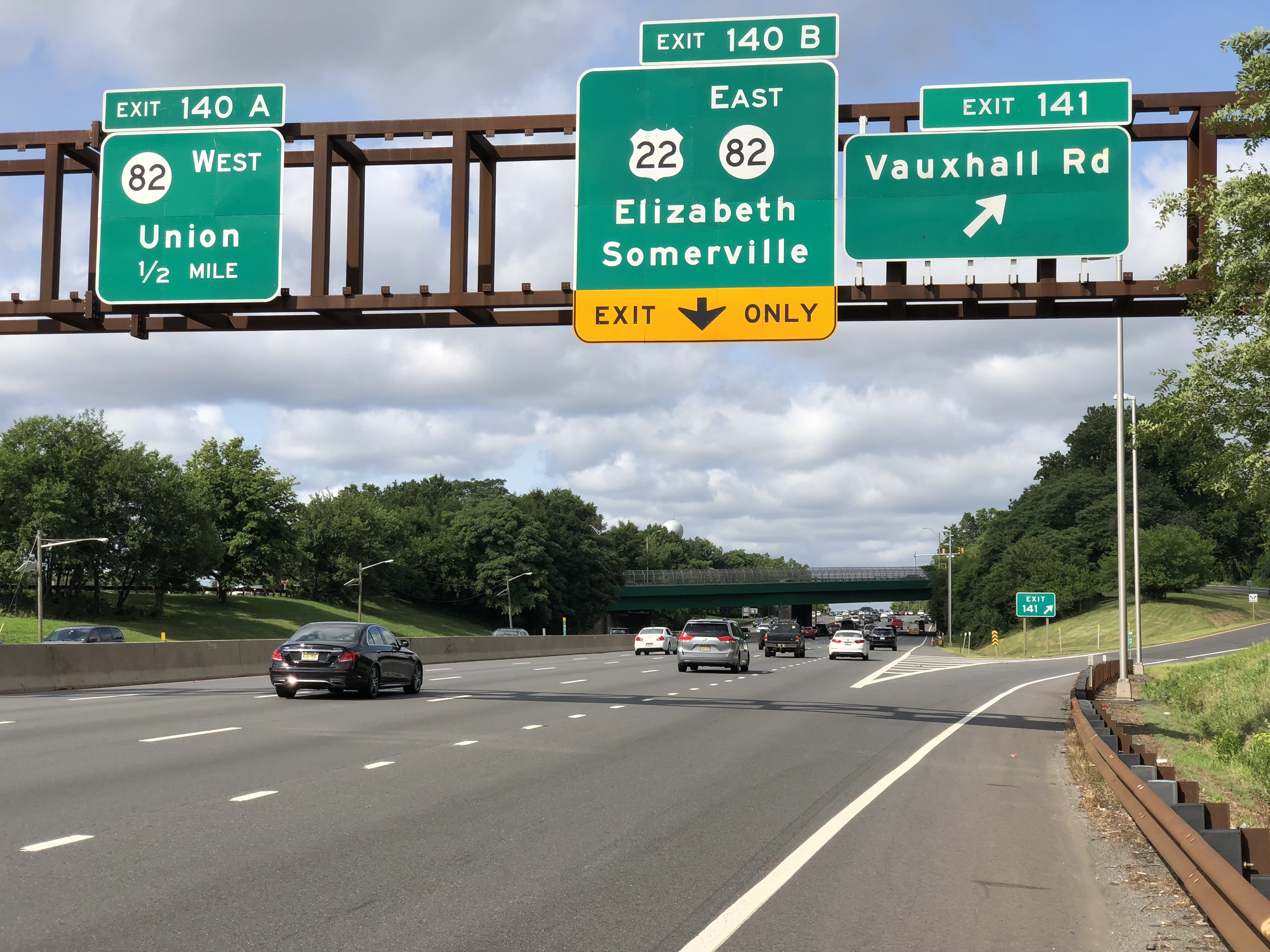
Garden State Parkway southbound at Vauxhall Road in Union Township

Crossing into Clark, Union County, the highway continues to pass through dense neighborhoods as a ten-lane roadway with a Jersey barrier. After crossing the Robinson's Branch Reservoir and passing an interchange with Central Avenue (CR 613), the southbound lanes have access to a maintenance yard. The highway then passes west of a park and Winfield Township before crossing the Rahway River into Cranford, where there is an interchange with Raritan Road (CR 607) and Centennial Avenue (CR 615). After passing west of a business park and over Conrail Shared Assets Operations' Lehigh Line and the inactive Rahway Valley Railroad, the parkway crosses NJ Transit's Raritan Valley Line and reaches an interchange with Route 28, which serves Roselle Park to the east. Upon entering Kenilworth, the highway passes many businesses before the road meets the interchange with Galloping Hill Road (CR 509), passes to the east of Galloping Hill Golf Course, and enters Union, where the parkway has an interchange with Chestnut Street (CR 619). Immediately afterwards, the road comes to an interchange with US 22 and Route 82 serving Hillside, where the Garden State Parkway briefly runs in between the carriageways of U.S. Route 22 and the Union Watersphere appears on the east side of the parkway. Here, the parkway narrows to eight lanes, and the northbound lanes have access to the Whitney Houston Service Area. After the service area, the road crosses the Elizabeth River and briefly enters Hillside, where it reaches the northbound Union Toll Plaza before an interchange with I-78.

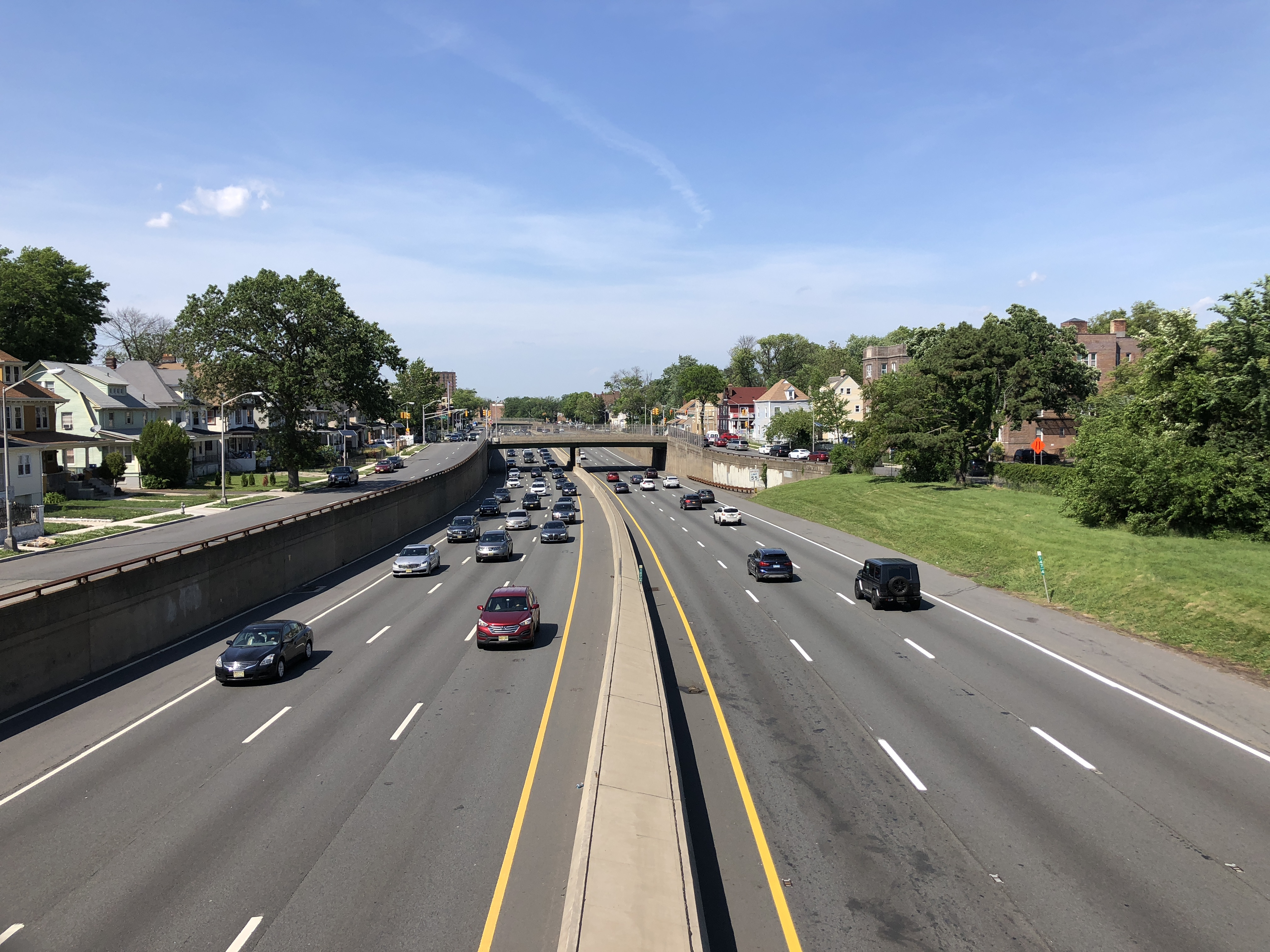
Garden State Parkway northbound in East Orange

Running northeast into Irvington, Essex County, the highway passes west of a park and east of many houses before reaching a pair of interchanges for local roads and passing through a short tunnel underneath a parking lot for Irvington Bus Terminal, serving NJ Transit buses. North of this point, the parkway gains frontage roads in each direction, which are mostly lined by residences. The frontage road for the northbound lanes is called Eastern Parkway, and the frontage road for the southbound lanes is called Western Parkway. After an interchange with South Orange Avenue (CR 510), the frontage roads end, and the parkway briefly enters Newark where it bisects Holy Sepulchre Cemetery, the northern end of which is in East Orange. After leaving the cemetery, the highway regains frontage roads which are known as Oraton Parkway. After passing East Orange General Hospital's Eastern Pavilion, the parkway comes to an interchange with I-280 and Central Avenue (CR 508), which serve Downtown Newark. At the interchange, the Garden State Parkway loses a lane in each direction and passes under NJ Transit's Morris & Essex Lines near East Orange station. The parkway continues to run in between frontage roads containing many houses before passing west of several apartment buildings and hospitals and crossing the abandoned Orange Branch of the New York and Greenwood Lake Railway. Winding into Bloomfield as a six-lane roadway, the Garden State Parkway crosses NJ Transit's Montclair-Boonton Line and has an interchange with Bloomfield Avenue (CR 506 Spur), where the frontage roads end. After passing under Norfolk Southern Railway's Boonton Line and reaching an exit for Belleville Avenue (CR 506), the parkway enters a more suburban area and the southbound parkway has the Essex Toll Plaza. The highway briefly enters Nutley before crossing back into Bloomfield, where the jersey barrier becomes a grassy median and the parkway reaches a diamond interchange for Watchung Avenue (CR 655) serving Montclair and passing the Larry Doby and Connie Chung service areas, serving northbound and southbound traffic respectively, to the west of the Upper Montclair Country Club.

=== Passaic and Bergen counties ===
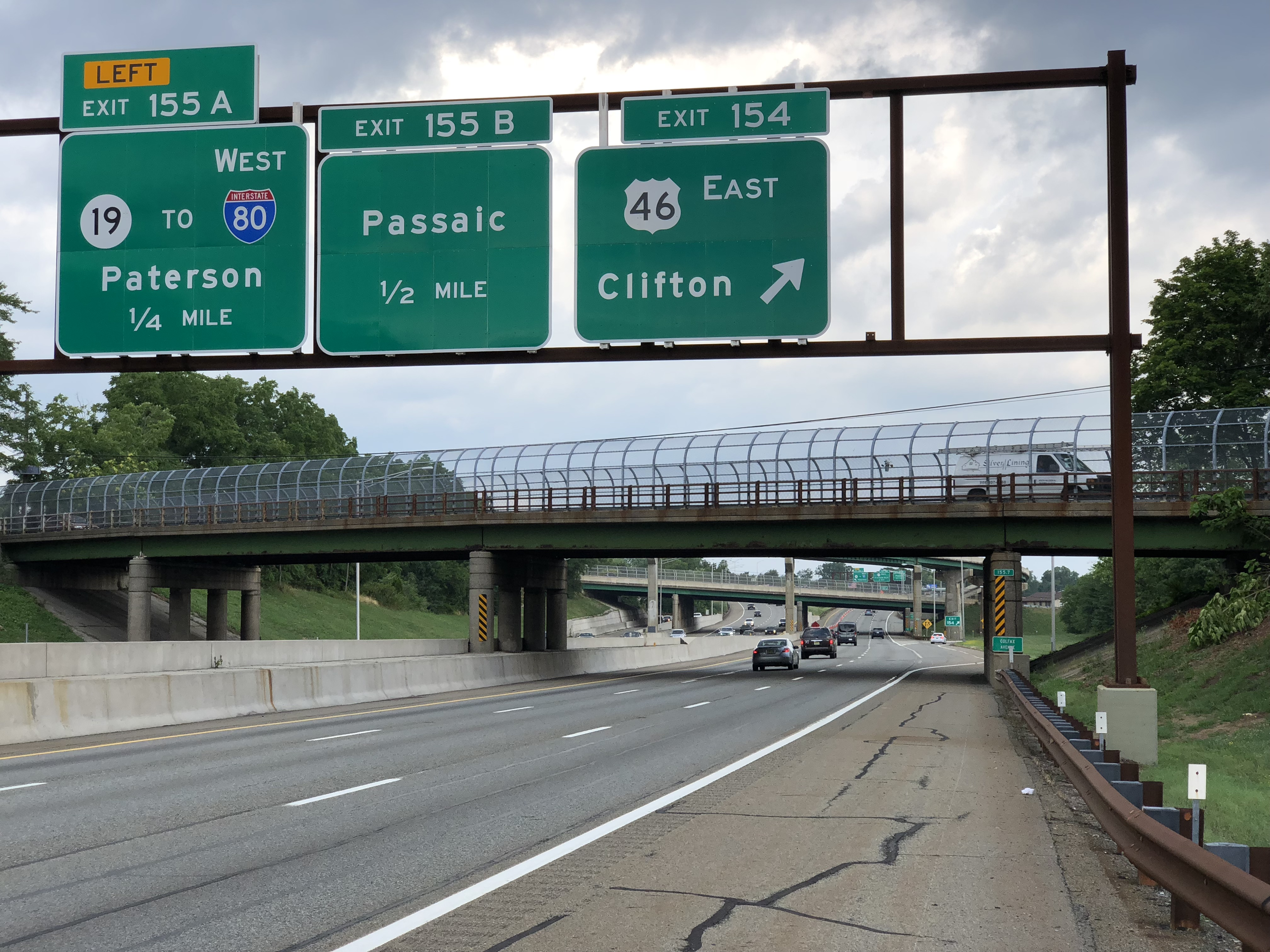
Garden State Parkway northbound at U.S. Route 46 in Clifton

The parkway crosses into Clifton, Passaic County, where it reaches an interchange with Route 3. At this point, the space between the northbound and southbound roadways contains the Allwood Road Park and Ride serving NJ Transit buses. After passing under a set of power lines and bisecting a residential area, the route has an incomplete interchange with US 46. Immediately north, the parkway meets the southern terminus of the Route 19 freeway, which heads north toward Paterson. Past this point, the highway curves northeast and passes over NJ Transit's Main Line before the median transitions to a Jersey barrier and the highway has a northbound exit and southbound entrance at Hazel Street (CR 702), serving Passaic. The parkway heads northeast past many homes before heading into a business district and crossing Norfolk Southern's Passaic Spur line. After passing many more residences near the route, the parkway reaches a partial interchange with the southern terminus of Route 20. Immediately afterwards, the parkway crosses the Passaic River and enters Elmwood Park, Bergen County, where it comes to a second interchange with U.S. Route 46, serving Garfield. Passing more homes, followed by several businesses, the highway then passes over the New York, Susquehanna and Western Railway's New Jersey Subdivision line and under NJ Transit's Bergen County Line before reaching an interchange with I-80 and the northbound Bergen Toll Plaza in Saddle Brook.

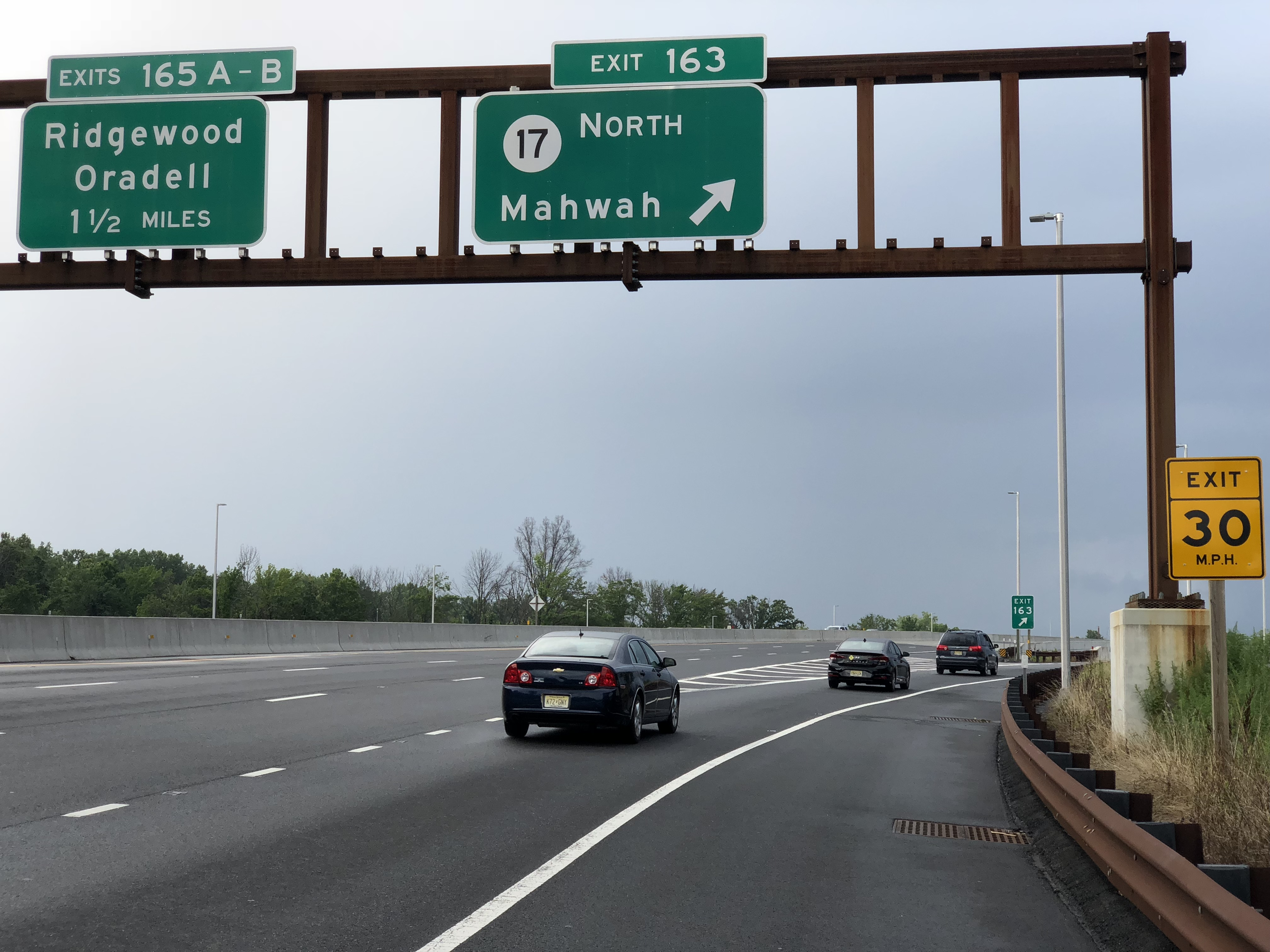
Garden State Parkway northbound at Route 17 in Paramus

Continuing northeast, the road passes through Saddle River County Park and crosses the Saddle River tributary into Rochelle Park. After leaving the park, it crosses a pair of interchanges for Route 208 and Route 4 as it enters Paramus near the Garden State Plaza shopping mall. North of Route 4, the parkway passes east of the Arcola Country Club and runs closely parallel with Route 17 before interchanging with it. Past this interchange, the median becomes grass-filled. After passing east of businesses and west of homes, the parkway passes in between the Paramus Park shopping mall and New Bridge Medical Center before reaching an interchange with East Ridgewood Avenue (CR 80), which serves Oradell and has a park and ride. After bisecting residential neighborhoods, the parkway has a partial interchange with Linwood Avenue (CR 110) before entering Washington Township where the southbound lanes have the Pascack Valley Toll Plaza—the northernmost toll plaza on the highway. North of the toll plaza, the median becomes substantially wider and trees begin to appear within it. The Garden State Parkway finally narrows from six to four lanes at the exit for Washington Avenue (CR 502), serving Westwood and Emerson. Winding through the Pascack Valley region of Bergen County past many homes and woodland, the parkway briefly enters Hillsdale before entering Woodcliff Lake, where there is a northbound exit and southbound entrance for Chestnut Ridge Road, which is accessed via CR S73 and serves Saddle River. The parkway then enters Montvale, where it reaches the James Gandolfini Service Area, the northernmost service area on the road. Immediately north is an exit for Grand Avenue (CR 94) serving Park Ridge; this is the northernmost exit of the Garden State Parkway, which crosses into the state of New York soon afterwards. From there, the route becomes the Garden State Parkway Connector, a component of the New York State Thruway system, which heads north toward the thruway mainline (I-87/I-287) in Nanuet.

== History ==
=== 1940s–1950s ===
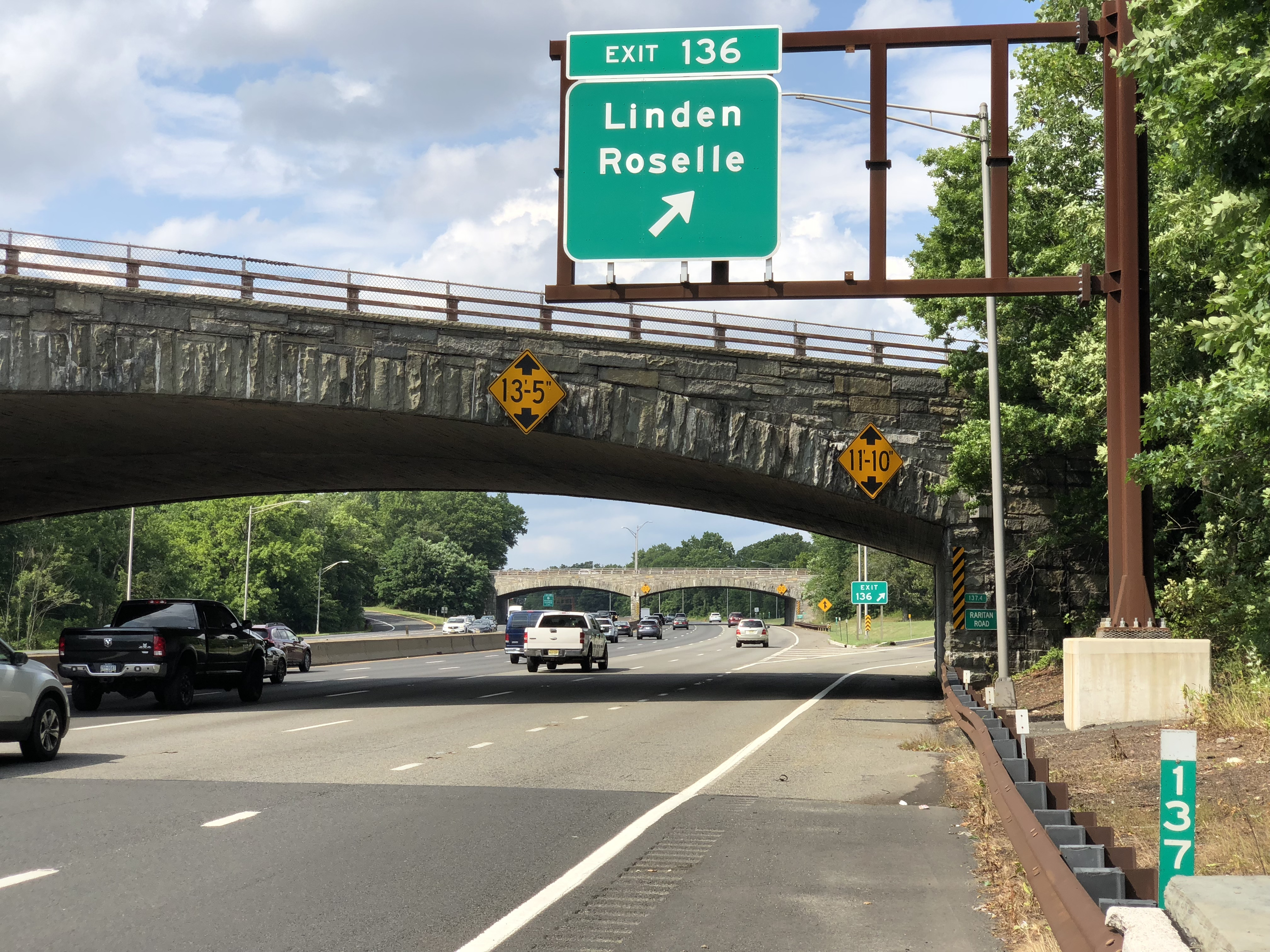
Stone overpasses on the Garden State Parkway in Union County

Plans for the Garden State Parkway date back to late 1941, in which a series of interconnected, individually named parkways throughout eastern New Jersey were proposed. The first of these was the Palisades Parkway, which was to enter the state from Rockland County, New York in the northeastern corner of New Jersey and end in Fort Lee near the George Washington Bridge. The road would then turn west and become the Pleasant Valley Parkway, which would run to the south of Paterson and head south from there. Eventually, the road would become Shore Parkway, which was to run along the coastline to just north of Atlantic City. From here, the parkway would continue south as the Cape May Extension.

Following World War II, traffic increased substantially on highways along the New Jersey coast. Due to the high traffic volume and presence of numerous traffic lights, it took motorists over three hours to travel between Paterson and Atlantic City. In 1946, plans were changed to construct a high-speed parkway to provide a bypass of Route 4, which, prior to 1953, ran from Cape May north to the George Washington Bridge by way of Paterson, largely following present-day US 1, US 9, and Route 35. This highway would be constructed using state funds and be known as the Route 4 Parkway. Construction began in 1947, and the first section to open ran from Route 27 north to Cranford and opened on June 29, 1950.

The landscape architect and engineer in charge of the newly named Garden State Parkway was Gilmore David Clarke of the engineering firm Parsons Brinckerhoff, who had worked with Robert Moses on the parkway systems around New York City. Clarke's design prototypes for the parkway combined the example of the Pennsylvania Turnpike, a model of efficiency with parallels in the German autobahn routes of the 1930s, with the Merritt Parkway model that stressed a planted "green belt" for beauty. Both design models featured wide planted medians to prevent head-on collisions and mask the glare of oncoming headlights. The Garden State Parkway was designed to have a natural feel. Many trees were planted, and the only signs were those for exits—there were no distracting billboards. Most of the signs were constructed from wood, or a dark-brown metal, instead of the chrome bars used on most other highways. The guardrails were also made from wood and dark metal. Most early overpasses were stone, but were later changed to concrete, with green rails and retro etchings, popular around the 1950s and 1960s. The parkway was designed to curve gently throughout its length so that drivers would remain alert and not fall asleep at the wheel.

The highway was extended south to New Brunswick Avenue in Woodbridge Township, Middlesex County, on November 1 that year. In Cape May County, a four-mile (6.4 km) bypass of Cape May Court House opened on July 29, 1951, from exit 12 to the point where the parkway directly parallels US 9 north of Burleigh. However, due to a lack of funds, construction of the Route 4 Parkway stalled. The only segment to open in 1952 was the bypass of Toms River, which opened on July 3. The solution was for the state to establish the New Jersey Highway Authority (NJHA) in April 1952 to oversee construction and operation of the remainder of the parkway as a self-liquidating toll road from Cape May to the New York state line. The parkway was extended north to Union Township on July 16, 1953.

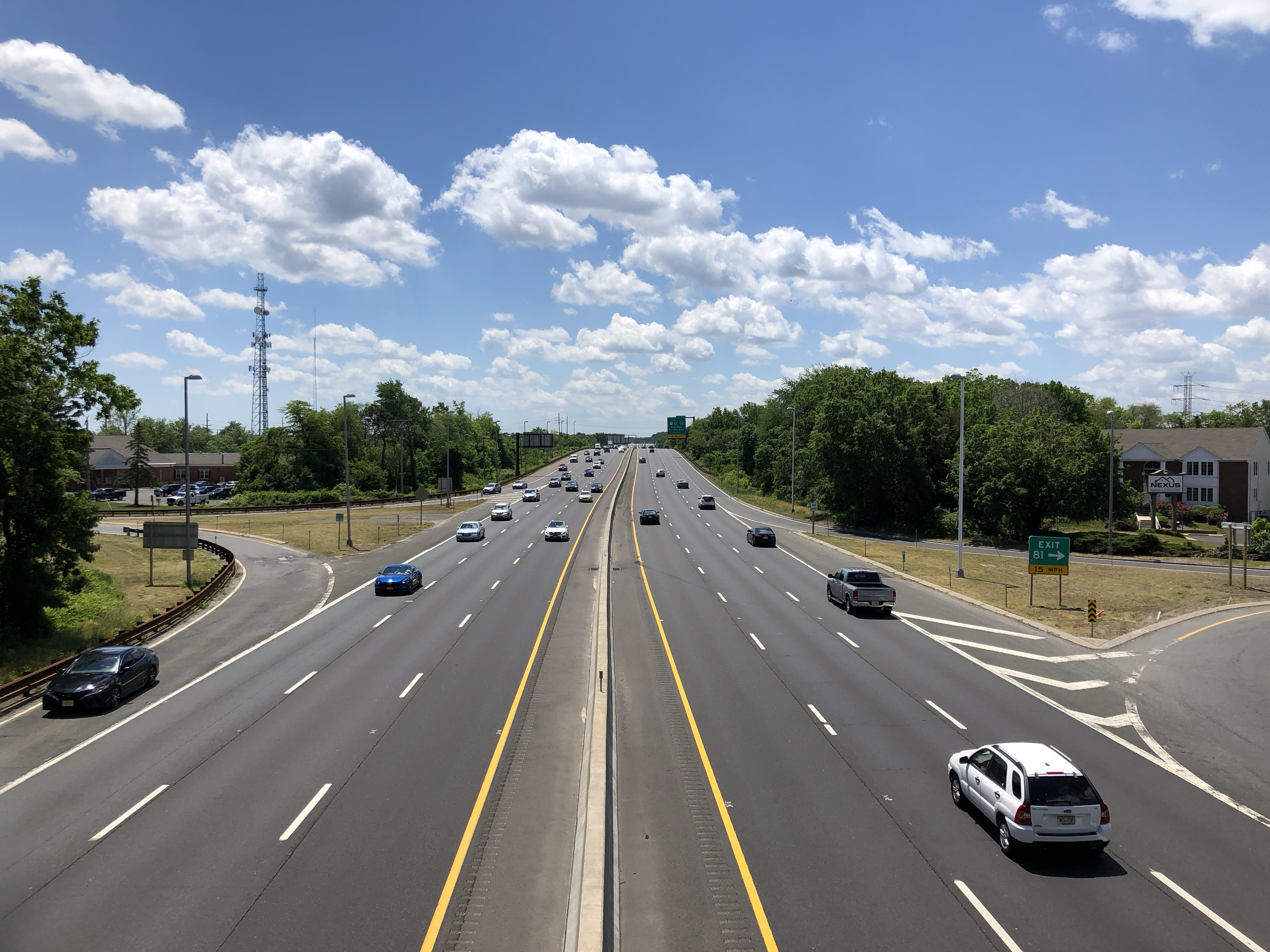
Garden State Parkway southbound in Toms River

Sections opened in quick succession in 1954; these were the first to be tolled. The first tolled segment was opened on January 13, 1954, from US 22 to Mill Road. The Toms River bypass was extended south to Manahawkin on July 15, and north to the Eatontown Spur (now Route 36) on July 30, 1954. The bridge carrying the parkway over the Raritan River was also opened to northbound traffic on this day, extending the highway south to US 9 in Sayreville. The southbound lanes were opened on the bridge south to Eatontown on August 4, and an extension to New Gretna opened the day after. Closing the northbound gap from Eatontown to Sayreville on August 7 provided for 90 miles of unbroken highway. Within Atlantic County, a large section from Tilton Road in Egg Harbor Township to the south bank of the Mullica River opened on August 11, though north of the White Horse Pike the road initially operated as a temporary super two on the southbound lanes until August 21. This was extended south to Somers Point on August 27 (again as a super-two before the northbound lanes opened on September 22), then connected across the Mullica River to the existing section on August 28 over a temporary super-two, with the other lanes opening a few weeks later. The Cape May section of highway was also extended north to Route 50 at Seaville that day, which then was extended south to Route 47 on September 4, and north to Beesley's Point Bridge on October 6. The entire highway south of Irvington was declared finished on October 9, 1954. The lone exception was across the Great Egg Harbor; the parkway temporarily detoured onto US 9 and over the Beesley's Point Bridge at this point. Literature from the time suggested that the parkway would become toll-free once bonds used for its construction were paid off. However, this speculation never became a reality.

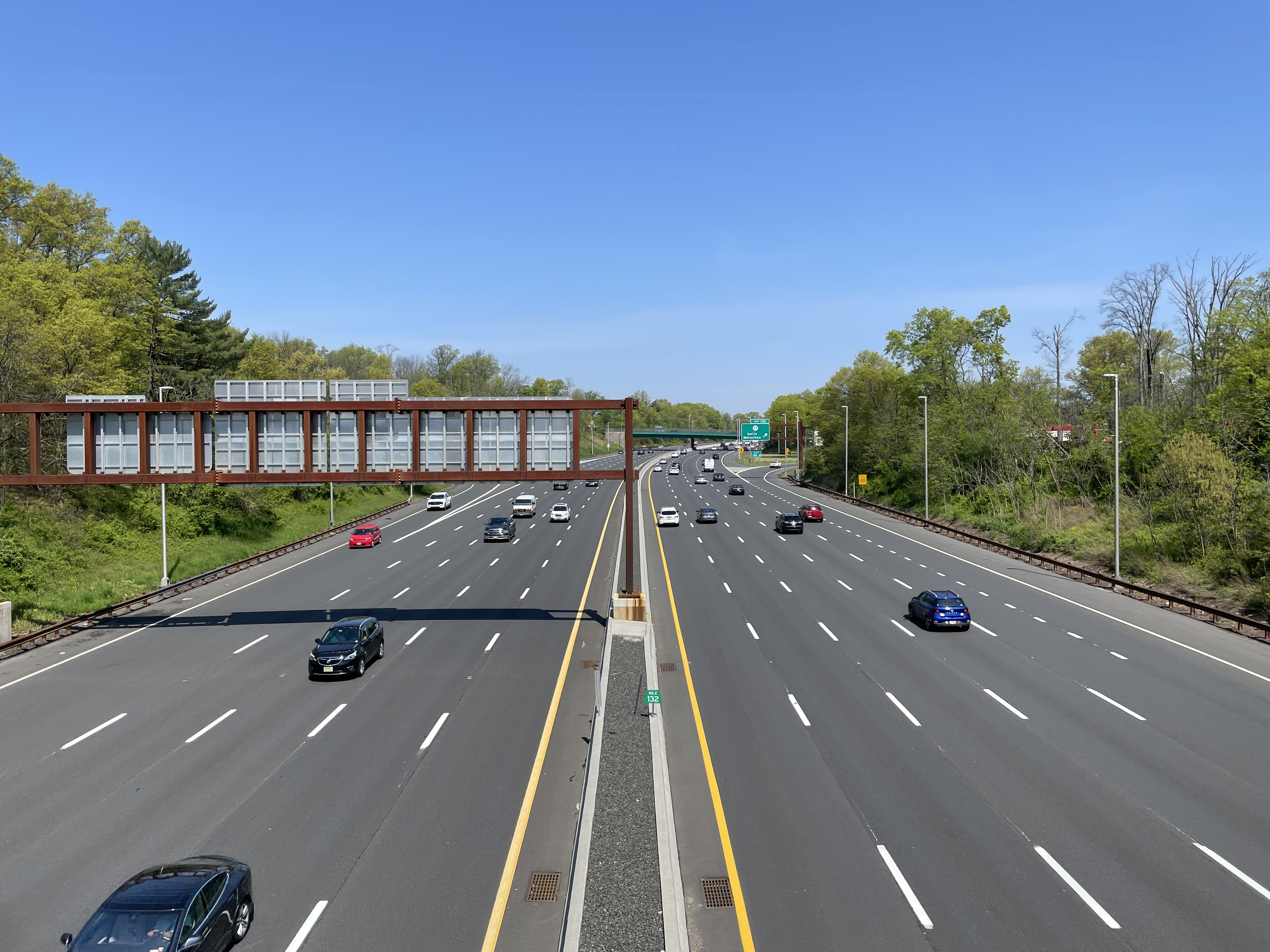
Garden State Parkway northbound at the Route 27 interchange in Woodbridge Township

Segments north of Irvington began opening in the months thereafter. The section from Irvington to Central Avenue in East Orange was scheduled to open on November 26, but complaints about the road's safety from Irvington officials stalled opening until December 9, after the erection of temporary fences along the road's length. An extension north also proved tumultuous: though scheduled to open on January 4, the extension to North Arlington Avenue opened a day earlier than scheduled. Mayor William McConnell ordered a blockade on this section of the highway on January 4, stating that North Arlington Avenue would be unable to handle traffic coming from the parkway. It was only when the southbound section was opened to exit 148 on January 8 that the blockade was lifted on the southbound section. At this point, Bloomfield mayor Donald E. Scott prevented the opening of the northbound lanes until the completion of a new bridge carrying Bloomfield Avenue over Second River needed to carry exiting traffic. Though this bridge was not completed for some time, the highway opened fully to US 46 on January 19, negating this prerequisite. However, Mayor Scott still barred all entrances and exits except for the southbound entrance from Bloomfield Avenue, until an inspection proved the highway safe; the exits were finally opened on January 21. During this conflict, the section from Route 3 to Hazel Street in Clifton opened on January 4. A similar blockade was threatened to be placed, but the announcement of speedy construction of fencing prevented this. On May 10, 1955, legislation was passed that made it legal for emergency vehicles to not pay tolls when on duty. The bridge over the Passaic River opened on May 26, 1955. This extended the parkway's northern terminus to US 46 in present-day Elmwood Park. On July 1 of that year, the portion of the highway from US 46 to Route 17 in Paramus opened. In spring 1955, a widening project began between US 22 and the Raritan River bridge; this would expand the roadway from four to six lanes. It was completed on July 9 of that year. In late 1955, construction of a northbound roadway began in Cape May. The new roadbed was opened north of Seaville by October 17, south of Cape May Court House by October 25, and fully by October 28. On April 16, 1956, the parkway's trailblazer was posted. The final stretch of permanent roadway was opened alongside the Great Egg Harbor Bridge, completing the parkway as outlined in original plans.

Soon after the parkway's opening, congestion on Route 17 increased substantially, prompting an extension of the parkway to Montvale, connecting to the newly built New York State Thruway. By November 30, 1955, it had been determined that this extension was financially feasible. On January 18, 1956, the NJHA entered into an agreement with the New York State Thruway Authority (NYSTA) for the prompt, and coordinated plans for extension. The agreement was formally signed on February 1 by NJHA Chairwoman Katharine E. White and NYSTA Chairman Bertram D. Tallamy. Groundbreaking for the road began on May 1 of that year. Unlike previous segments of the roadway, this one uses prestressed concrete for overpasses; this made correcting errors during construction or future demolition easier. It was originally proposed as part of a northern extension of the unbuilt Route 101, a highway that was intended to run from Kearny to Hackensack. The extension, Route S101, would have continued northward from Hackensack to the state line via Paramus. Approximately nine miles (14 km) in length, the extension was planned to run north through the Bergen County municipalities of Paramus, Washington Township, Hillsdale, Woodcliff Lake, and Montvale to the state line, where the parkway would meet with a connecting spur from the mainline of the New York State Thruway. Part of the extension to Chestnut Ridge opened on July 3, 1957, and the Thruway's Garden State Parkway Connector opened on August 29 that year.

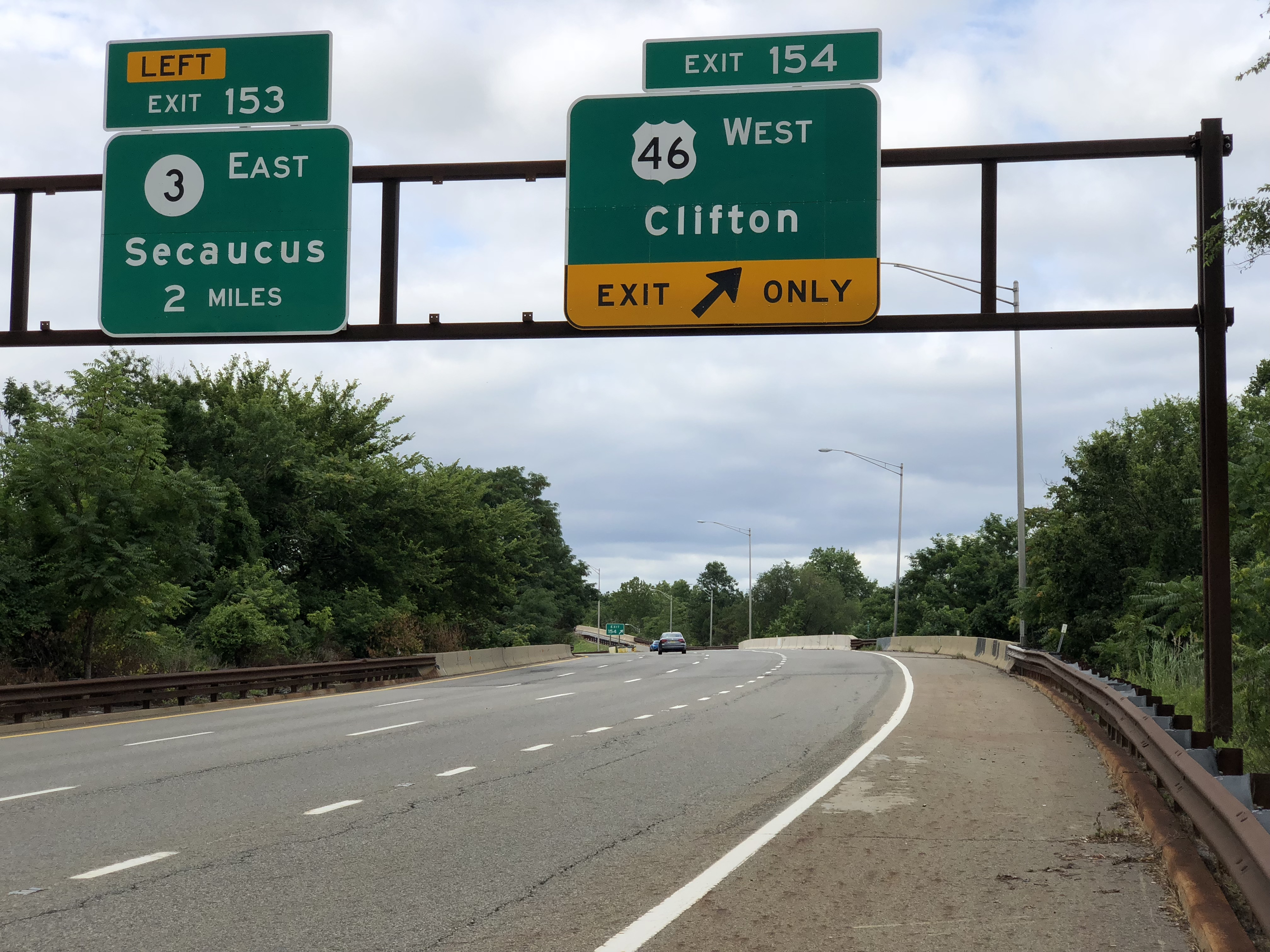
Garden State Parkway southbound approaching exit 154 with U.S. Route 46 in Clifton

By the time the parkway had been extended to the New York State Thruway, the need for a full interchange at the exit 154 was noted. Following the recommendation of a survey to do so, D. Louis Tonti, the executive director of the New Jersey Highway Authority, announced plans in December 1957 to construct two new overpasses at exit 154 in Clifton. These overpasses would connect drivers from US 46 eastbound to the parkway northbound, and from the parkway southbound to US 46 westbound. In May 1958, a bid of the project went to Thomas Nichol Company, Inc. of Farmingdale, and construction began immediately. By August 1958, the piers for the new viaduct from US 46 eastbound to the parkway northbound were finishing up. In September, the completed piers had roadway construction on top of them. The new ramps opened on January 1, and the toll booths on the ramps opened in February, replacing the toll booths on the grounded ramps, which were later demolished. The total cost of the project was $2.25 million, which was half a million higher than the original estimate. Dedication of the overpasses occurred on January 15, 1959, when the Highway Authority and several city officials attended a ceremony and a luncheon.

=== 1960s ===
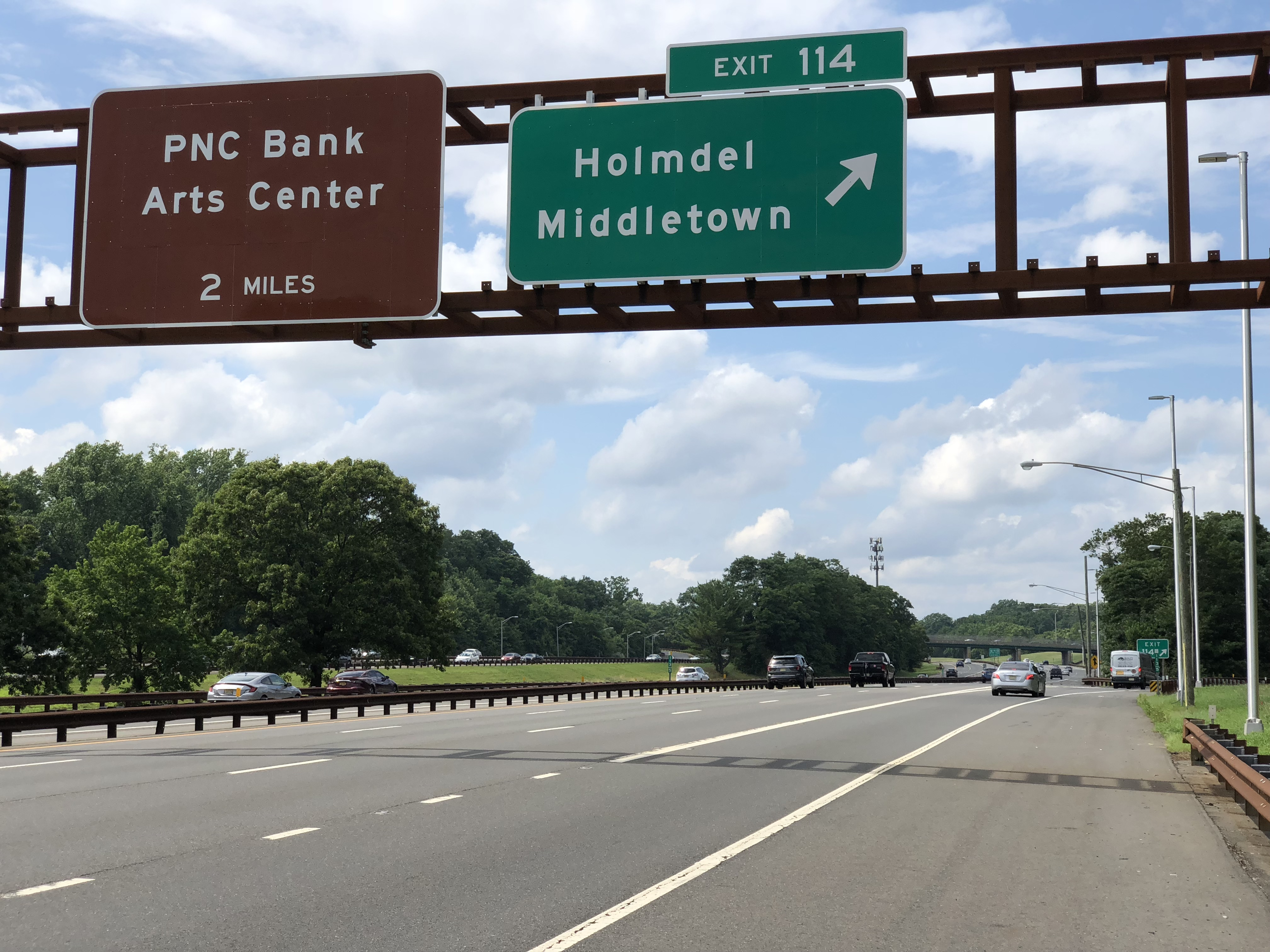
Garden State Parkway northbound at exit 114 in Middletown Township

In March 1961, the Highway Authority announced that plans were being made to construct a new interchange at either Red Hill Road or Nutswamp Road. By June, the Highway Authority announced that the interchange would be built at Red Hill Road. In November, it was announced the exit would replace the free exit 116, though rather than being demolished, it would simply be restricted to emergency traffic. Exit 114 would help relieve local congestion that traveled to the new Bell Labs Holmdel Complex and other industrial parks operating in the area. On December 14, the Highway Authority made an appropriation of $50,000 for the engineering work on the interchange. Construction began on the exit 114 ramps on July 30, 1962, when construction equipment was taken to the site. The exit was opened to traffic on December 20, 1962, with two toll facilities also being constructed. Exit 116 was closed as planned; this was received negatively by locals.

On June 18, 1963, a meeting was held between NJHA officials, Senator Charles W. Sandman Jr., and the Cape May County Board of Freeholders. They discussed safety issues found at exit 12's exit ramp. A northbound-only ramp that traveled at-grade across the southbound lanes, it had been described as a "serious hazard" by the NJHA's safety committee. After an agreement was settled on and approval came from the State Highway department, it was announced to the public on June 26 that the northbound ramp would close permanently. When this occurred on July 2, all northbound traffic that previously utilized the ramp was advised to use exit 13, only 0.5 miles (0.80 km) to the north, instead. The entrance onto the northbound lanes from US 9 was left unaltered.

On July 31, 1964, a project to construct exit 38 was completed. The cloverleaf interchange, which cost approximately $800,000, was built to serve as a link to the newly constructed Atlantic City Expressway.

In May 1962, plans were announced to widen the segment from exit 154 to just near exit 158 from two to three lanes. As part of this project, the Passaic River Bridge was to be reconstructed with a wider superstructure and piers. The Bergen Toll Plaza also was rebuilt to give each direction dedicated toll canopies instead of all traffic merging into a single canopy, as then existed. This part of the project was completed in December 1963. A two-mile segment of roadway from the Passaic County line to exit 154 also was repaved, to add a one-inch overlay of asphalt. This project also included lengthening and widening northbound acceleration lanes to exit 153A, exit 153B, and the grounded ramp at exit 154. This part of the project began on August 1 and was completed by October 31. Construction also began on a new exit 159. This interchange would serve I-80 with direct connections and Midland Avenue with indirect connections. In preparation for this construction, the northbound exit and southbound entrance of exit 158 were closed permanently on March 16, 1963, with the remaining connections closed on June 22. On December 23 of that year, the ramps onto Midland Avenue from exit 159 were opened to traffic. Tolling of the interchange began immediately. However, the ramps to and from I-80 would not open until October 20, 1964. The project cost a total of $4,500,000. In November of that year, the northbound exit and southbound entrance at exit 157 were permanently closed, to encourage use of exit 159.

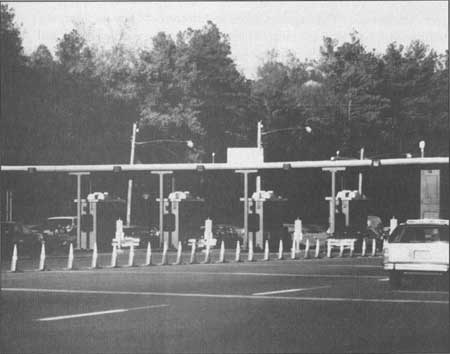
Historical picture of a Garden State Parkway toll plaza

On March 8, 1965, a project began to improve the segment between the Cape May Toll Plaza and exit 30. It involved a major reconstruction of exit 29, replacing the at-grade intersection with a new grade-separated northbound exit and southbound entrance. Exit 30 also had its northbound entrance and southbound exit closed and a toll plaza constructed. Additionally, the Great Egg Toll Plaza was replaced by a new, wider plaza north of the old one, and the Cape May plaza had two extra collection lanes constructed. While initially planned for competition by July 1, competition was delayed to July 15.

In the mid-1960s, a project to reconstruct interchanges in Essex County was undertaken. On January 1, 1966, a project was completed that constructed longer deceleration lanes and widened the exit and entrance ramps of exits 148 and 144. On January 10, tolling began on exit 148. In December 1965, a related project began to reconstruct exit 143. It would contain a collector-distributor roadway. When the project was completed on April 12, 1966, exit 142 was renumbered as exit 143. Additionally, in December 1965, plans were announced to replace exit 145. Unlike the old ramps, this new one would provide access to I-280. Also as part of this project, exit 146 would be demolished, and an overpass would be built to replace part of the depressed roadway. The exits 146 and 145 were permanently closed to traffic in late 1965. On January 12, 1966, the replacement exit 145 opened to traffic, though the ramps onto I-280 remained barricaded off while the highway was still under construction. On October 13, 1967, the I-280 segment and its ramps were partially opened, completing the project. These projects were carried out to reduce congestion, which had previously run rampant due to its interchanges being largely free of tolls.

The Highway Authority rebuilt exit 4 into a full interchange, with new ramps being built and old ones being reconstructed to provide full connections. The project, completed on May 24, 1968, also involved the construction of two new toll facilities. In March of that year, construction also began on a new access road to the Garden State Arts Center at exit 116. It was completed in June of that year, and on August 8, exit 116 was reopened with a new exit number.

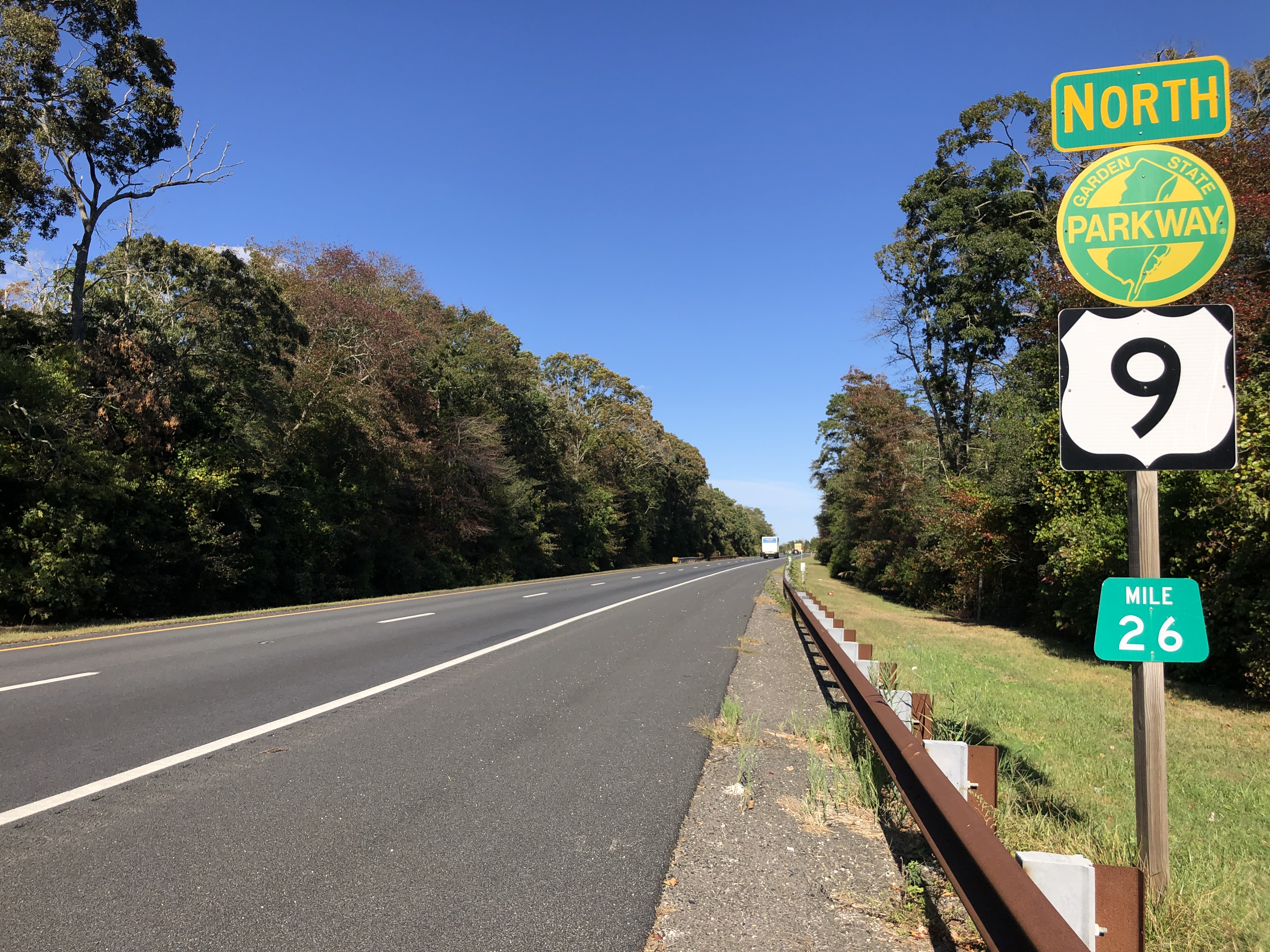
Garden State Parkway and US 9 northbound in Upper Township

In May 1966, the borough of Paramus and the New Jersey Highway Authority announced plans to replace exit 165, as well as widening of the parkway through the borough to three lanes. It would have involved construction of new overpasses and demolition of the old ones, including a new pedestrian overpass to serve a nearby school. Costing $3.7 million (equivalent to $27.2 million in 2024), construction on the new complete interchange began almost immediately, with the new southbound ramps opening on November 30, 1966, On December 29, the dual ramps on the northbound direction opened. On February 13, tolls went into effect on the Ridgewood Avenue interchange. On January 6, 1967, exit 166 was closed in order to reduce congestion on local roads in the general vicinity. By September, it had been forcibly reopened after a gag order was secured to prevent local authorities from affecting parkway operations.

In early 1967, the parkway was widened from four to six lanes between the Bergen Toll Plaza and exit 161 in Paramus. In 1968, the road was widened from four to six lanes between exit 163 and exit 165. In early 1969, the roadway was widened between exit 163 and exit 161. These widenings made the entire 80-mile (130 km) stretch from Ocean County to Paramus at least six lanes wide. When the parkway was opened through Clifton in 1955, a spur was supposed to open south of its exit to Broad Street at exit 155P. However, by 1965, no other construction had occurred, and the parkway's spur had been canceled. Because of this, in 1967, work began on a project to construct the remaining ramps at exit 155P (now exit 155A); instead of serving as a spur of the parkway, they would serve Route 20 (now Route 19) instead. The ramps were opened to traffic on October 20, 1969.

=== 1970s ===
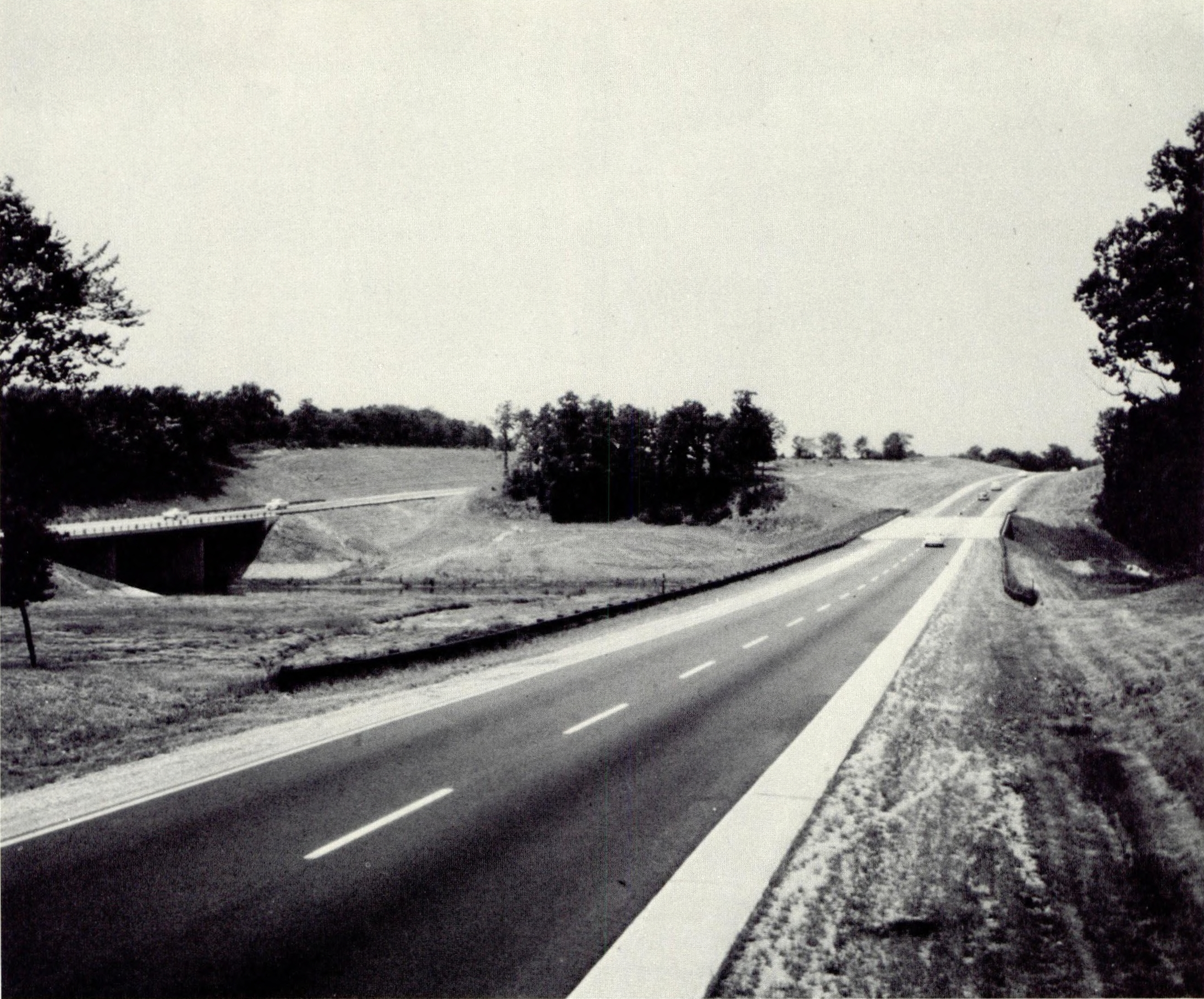
Garden State Parkway in the 1970s

In 1972, the dualization of the Great Egg Harbor Bridge eliminated the final two-lane segment of the parkway. On September 18, 1969, a new exit 129 was opened; the remaining ramps were opened to traffic by early 1970. This replaced the existing interchange, and made it so that the New Jersey Turnpike had direct connections to both directions of the parkway and vice versa. On November 24, 1970, southbound parkway traffic from there south to the Raritan River was redirected onto a new roadway that lied in the median of the old one; the old carriageways were not demolished however, but rather became an exit onto US 9, effectively creating a collector-distributor road. This bypass effectively eliminated the two former exits; while these still exist, they are now exits on US 9. On August 17, 1971, the same switch occurred to the northbound roadway; the old one also became a collector-distributor road, though it rather served as a US 9 ramp to connect to the northbound GSP as well as the New Jersey Turnpike.

An expansion of the Driscoll Bridge across the Raritan River was completed on September 2, 1971. Work then began on widening the Sayerville side and repairing and widening the existing part of the bridge deck; work was completed by the beginning of 1972. On January 17, 1973, exit 127 was opened to serve Route 440 south. By June, the link to Route 440 north had opened. In May 1973, exit 98 was opened to northbound traffic. On July 3, 1973, the southbound exit 98 opened, completing the project. This exit replaced the preexisting exits 96, 97, and 97A, with the new exit featuring a right hand collector-distributor roadway combining the cloverleafs at exits 97 and 97A as well as the left-hand ramp at exits 97, which had its southbound ramp closed on July 1, 1973.

On February 21, 1974, a project to rebuild exit 91 to increase safety was completed; as part of this project, an at-grade intersection at the toll plazas was constructed. On February 27, 1974, exit 117A (now exit 118) opened to the public; a temporary northbound ramp was opened while exit 117 was reconstructed into a right side exit. This was completed later that year; the new exit 117 as well as the southbound exit 117A were tolled, unlike their original equivalents. On July 2, 1973, southbound traffic heading onto exit 105 was redirected onto a new right hand ramp, and the left-hand ramp was permanently closed. In mid 1974, construction began on new express roadways in the median thorough Monmouth County; it was two lanes wide in each direction, and had fewer exits than the local roadway. The segment from Sayerville to Keyport was opened on July 3. Alongside this project came new ramps onto exit 105. The segment of roadway from Keyport to the Tinton Falls toll plaza was opened on August 2 of that year. Alongside this segment came new ramps at exit 117.

=== 1980s ===
In 1980, plans were made to construct exit 171, which would serve the boom of office complexes replacing farmland across Chestnut Ridge Road. In March 1985, the entrance leading onto the southbound parkway was opened, with the exit ramp opening on July 25 of that year. In 1973, plans were made to widen a 3.1-mile (5.0 km) segment in Toms River. While this widening was planned to be completed by 1975, its competition was delayed to 1978. By 1979, work on the Toms River segment was completed; at this point the project transitioned to widening the segment between the Asbury Park toll plaza and exit 100 from two to four lanes, as well as reconstructing exits 102, and widening the segment in Lakewood from two to three lanes. On November 17, 1980, the road was widened from three to four lanes between exits 129 and exits 141. These new lanes were HOV lanes that were restricted to vehicles with three or more occupants, though this was later lowered to two or more occupants in June 1981. They were converted into general use lanes in 1982 after almost universal criticism. In late 1983, a project to widen the segment of roadway near the Raritan Toll Plaza from five to six lanes began. The entire project was completed by 1984. Work on the rest of the project was completed at the end of 1985. Also as part of this project the Asbury Park and Union toll plaza were reconstructed with dedicated canopies in each direction. This project made it so that the entire segment between Woodbridge and East Orange was at least four lanes wide.

On November 19, 1986, exit 131B was opened to traffic. The interchange, which was constructed as part of a related upgrade to Metropark station, cost $4.4 million to construct. In 1987, the NJHA purchased the 19 miles (31 km) of road that had been constructed by what is now the New Jersey Department of Transportation. These state-maintained segments were located in Cape May County between exits 6 and exits 12, in Ocean County between exit 80 and exit 83, and in Middlesex and Union counties between exit 129 and exit 140. NJDOT sold the sections for one dollar with the requirement that tolls were never to be charged on them. That same year, the roadway between mileposts 99.5 and 83.5 was restriped from two lanes with a shoulder to three lanes with no shoulder. In December 1986, a new right hand ramp at exit 100 was opened; the existing the left-hand one was then closed permanently. Work also began in March 1987, to construct new overpasses, implode the existing ones, replacing lighting and signage, reconstructing the unaltered exits to meet with the new overpasses, and widening the parkway in the area from four lanes to six lanes. Work on the project was fully complete by December 1987. In 1988, the northbound exit 105 ramp was reconstructed, a new loop ramp to feed onto Route 18 northbound was built, and the existing deceleration lane was replaced by a new one. In addition, an on-ramp was built that allows southbound Route 18 traffic to enter the southbound local roadway.

=== 1990s ===
In 1994, a third lane was added to the segment between mileposts 81 and 82. The Highway Authority also rebuilt exit 74. In addition to the construction of toll plazas in both directions, other alterations were made, such as demolishing the southbound entrance and exit ramps and constructing new ones to turn around at where the southbound entrance once was, thus eliminating the traffic signal that existed prior. This was completed on November 20, 1996, though at the cost of $4.4 million. In April 1997, plans to construct a jughandle overpass from southbound exit 159 onto eastbound I-80 were made. Also as part of this, new traffic signals would be installed at the Midland Avenue ramps, and its overpass crossing the parkway would be reconstructed to be wider. Work on this project began immediately, and the ramp was opened to traffic in January 1998, six months ahead of schedule. Despite the fact it was not designed with it in mind, the overpass carrying I-80 traffic was not rebuilt, instead, a retaining wall was constructed instead.

On April 1, 1998, a project to construct a new northbound ramp to Lomell Lane at exit 83 was completed. Later that year, a traffic signal was installed at exit 81, in addition to other safety improvements. In June 1999, a project to expand the Barnegat toll plaza was completed and with it eliminated the final single canopied mainline plaza. Also included in this project was new fencing, new electrical work, increased landscaping, and a toll re-coordinating shed. E-ZPass was first installed at the Pascack Valley Toll Plaza in December 1999, with the Raritan Toll Plaza following in April 2000. By August, installation of the system had been fully completed.

=== 2000s ===
In April 2001, a project to replace the Dover Road overpass to allow for improvements to said road was completed. Later that year, a law was also passed that required tolls to be kept as long as there are construction projects occurring, effectively shooting down any proposals to make the entire parkway toll-free.

On July 9, 2003, Governor Jim McGreevey's plan to disband the New Jersey Highway Authority and give control of the parkway to the New Jersey Turnpike Authority (NJTA) was completed. Additionally, in November of that year, construction was completed on the $16.23 million exit 89, a new southbound exit and northbound entrance in Lakewood. This new exit featured a toll facility, and was located in the same general area as exit 88. Due to featuring collector-distributor lanes, the Cedar Bridge Road bridge had to be demolished and a replacement with a wider superstructure built in its place.

In 2005, the entrance and exit at exit 123 were both widened from one to two lanes, a southbound entrance was constructed at exit 131, and missing links were constructed at exit 114 as well as exit 13.

In March 2007, a project to reconstruct exit 69 was completed. New ramps were built, and the existing ones were demolished. Unlike them, the new ramps had full connections; the new ones were also tolled, with two plazas being built on each side. This also came with replacement of the overpass carrying traffic over the parkway with a longer one.

In September 2006, construction began on improvements to exit 145. This project, which replaced the ramps with longer and wider ones as well as building new E-ZPass lanes at the ramp's toll plaza, was completed in November 2007 at the price of $11 million, and was completed three years ahead of schedule.

In October 2007, a project to improve exit 135 began. It was completed circa May 2008.

In 2001, plans to reconstruct exit 63 and add missing connections were announced. This project was completed in late 2008.

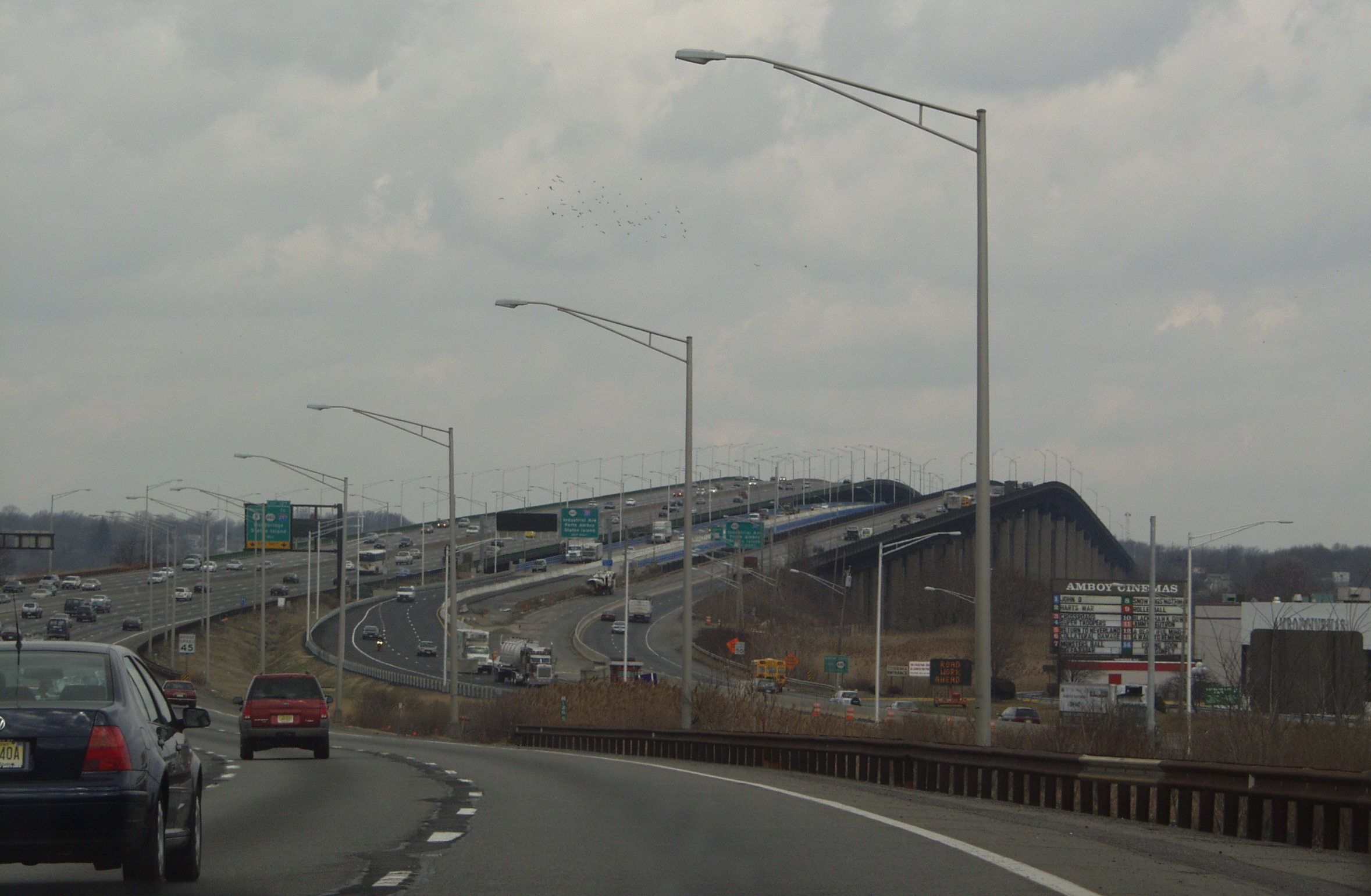
Garden State Parkway northbound approaching the Driscoll Bridge in 2002, before the southbound span was built

On September 25, 2002, construction began on a new span of the Driscoll Bridge just west of the original spans, consisting of seven lanes and emergency shoulders. On May 3, 2006, all southbound traffic was shifted onto the new span, and the original was closed for superstructure replacement. On May 20, 2009, all northbound traffic was shifted back onto the original spans, and the new one was made exclusively for southbound traffic.

To reduce congestion, all of the parkway's mainline toll plazas were converted into one-way plazas between 2004 and 2010, except for the Toms River Toll Plaza, which remains bidirectional. The Cape May (in Upper Township), New Gretna (in Bass River Township), Asbury Park (in Tinton Falls), Union (in Hillside), and Bergen (in Saddle Brook) toll plazas were converted to northbound-only plazas, while the Great Egg (in Somers Point), Barnegat (in Barnegat Township), Raritan (in Sayreville), Essex (in Bloomfield), and Pascack Valley (in Washington Township) toll plazas became southbound-only plazas. The tolls at these locations were doubled upon conversion.

In April 2008, a $150 million project began to construct new overpasses at exit 142. In its 1976 configuration, the parkway northbound did not have a ramp to I-78 westbound, and the parkway southbound did not have an exit to I-78 eastbound. The lack of connections was due to the cancellation of the extension of I-278 (which would have connected northbound parkway traffic with I-78 westbound) and Route 75 (which would have connected southbound parkway traffic with I-78 eastbound via I-280) in the early 1980s. The New Jersey Department of Transportation (NJDOT) awarded the project contract to the engineering firm Gannett Fleming for the design, and to Union Paving & Construction Company for building the ramps. The ramp connecting the parkway northbound with I-78 westbound opened on September 16, 2009, with a ribbon cutting ceremony led by Governor Jon Corzine. The ramp connecting the parkway southbound with I-78 eastbound opened on December 10, 2010.

=== 2010s ===
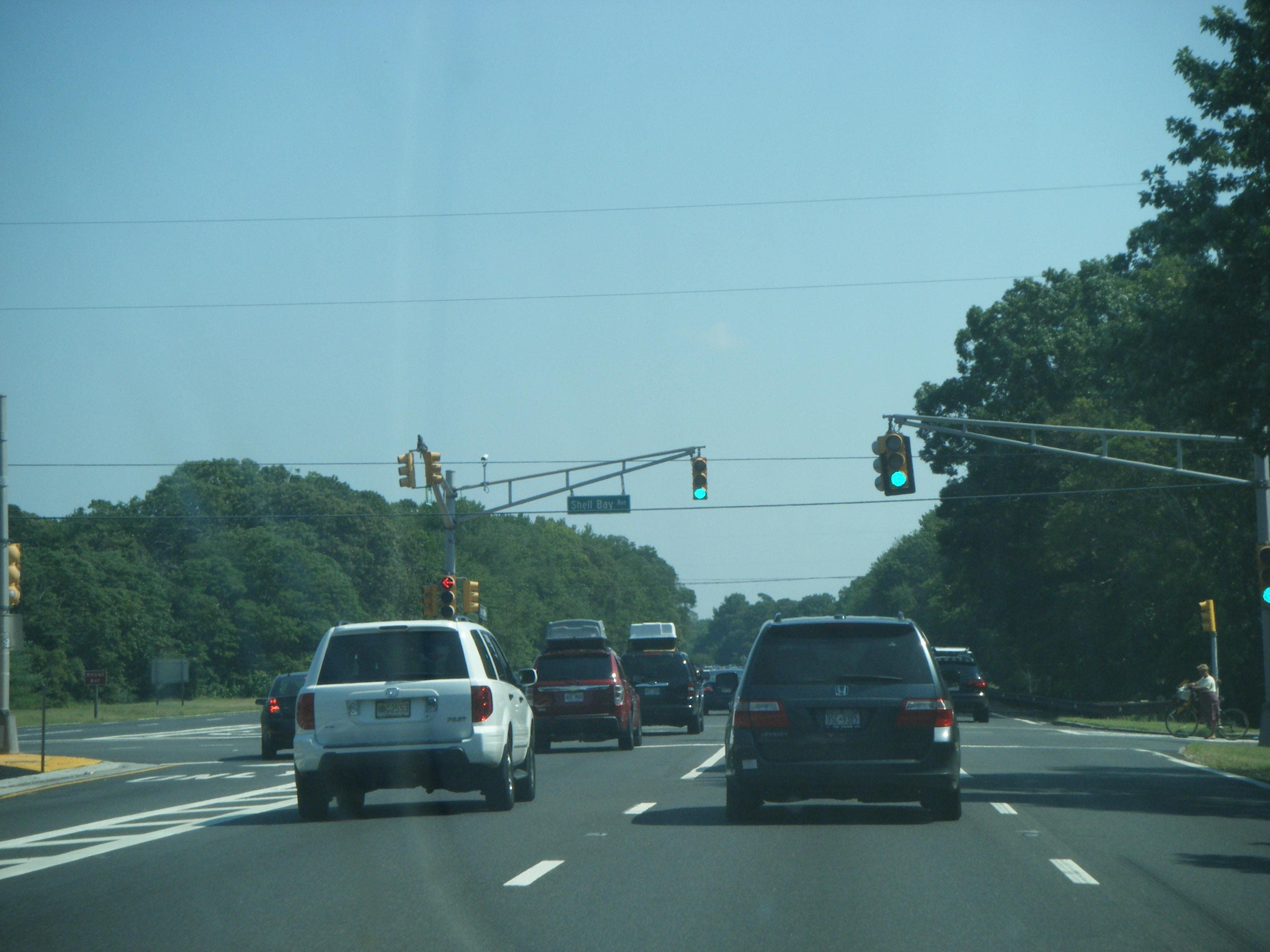
Former traffic light at exit 9 (Shell Bay Avenue) before construction of overpass in 2014

As originally built, in Cape May County, the parkway had three at-grade intersections (at exits 9, 10, and 11), but a project to eliminate began in early 2013, when construction began on three overpasses in Cape May Court House. The plan was delayed because it had not been approved by the federal government. The $125 million project was largely complete by September 2015, with the Mechanic Street interchange also being closed around this time.

On September 5, 2016, a project to rebuild exit 0 was completed. It involved constructing a new ramp from Route 109 southbound onto the parkway northbound, relocating the ramp itself onto a new, shorter alignment, and reconfiguring the traffic signal with pedestrian crosswalks and other safety features.

In 2012, a project to reconstruct the roadway between mileposts 83 and 100 in order to add shoulders was started. On November 9, 2014, exit 88 was permanently closed. On June 11, 2015, the northbound replacement exit 89 were opened to traffic. It was completed in May 2017, when the reconstruction of exit 91 into a full interchange was completed, albeit ten months behind schedule because the legislature failed to raise the state's gas tax.

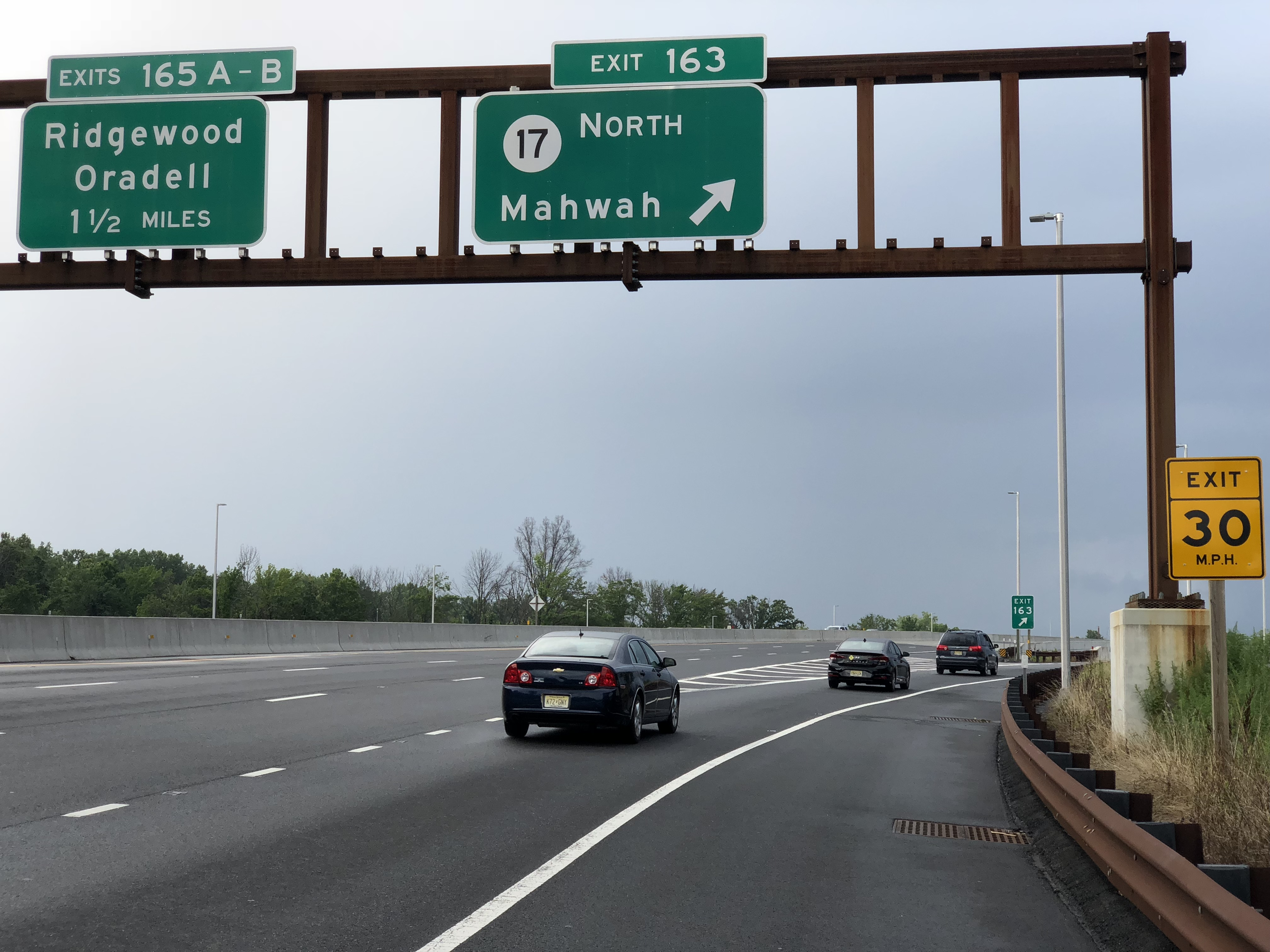
Garden State Parkway northbound at Route 17 in Paramus

In April 2014, a $68 million project to eliminate the left-hand ramps at exit 163 began. Due to this, a half mile stretch of the GSP mainline was shifted towards the median, with the existing ramps retained but now passing under the parkway and joining it from the right. This major project was completed in September 2017, with minor work continuing into mid-October.

In 2012, the improvement of exit 105 southbound at the intersection with Route 36 on the local lanes was proposed. It involved replacing the single-lane ramp which provided access to Route 36 with a new one. This ramp would have two lanes and a wider shoulder, and would also provide access to Route 18 via Wayside Road. Additionally, the northbound ramp onto Route 36 would be constructed; as opposed to locating traffic onto Route 36, it would instead carry traffic into an intersection with Wayside Road . Also, in both directions, the deceleration lanes were increased in length and widened to two lanes in addition to lighting improvements and replacing the underhead signage southbound with new overhead ones, and replacing the sign heads northbound. Construction began in 2013, and was completed by the end of 2017.

In May 2005, Governor Richard Codey announced plans for a widening of the parkway between exit 63 in Stafford Township and exit 80 in the borough of South Toms River from two to three lanes in both directions. However, the NJTA later made plans to widen the parkway from exit 80 all the way south to exit 30 in Somers Point. In 2008, planning began on a project to construct a southbound entrance and northbound exit at exit 67. By March 27, it was revealed that the new ramps would not be tolled. Construction began in the summer of 2008. While initially planned for completion on May 20, 2009, it was ultimately completed in October 2010. The project was divided into three phases. The first of these, the one from exits 80 to 63, was completed in May 2011. In November 2014, a widening project was completed between exits 63 and 48. Exit 41 was opened on March 13, 2015. Previously, drivers who wanted to go to Jimmie Leeds Road had to cut through the parking lot of the Atlantic City Service area, though they still can, however the traffic light that previously existed was eliminated. In June 2017, three projects to improve exits 36, 37, and 38 were completed. A new ramp was built at exit 38 order to reduce unsafe weaving, exit 37 had its deceleration lane reconstructed to be longer, and exit 36 was rebuilt to eliminate its stop-and-go pattern. In 2018, a widening from exits 48 to milepost 30 was completed, it included reconstruction of overpasses, and the opening of new bridges across the Mullica River from Port Republic to Bass River, after which point the older ones had their superstructures replaced.

The southbound bridge over Great Egg Harbor Bay was replaced with a wider span parallel to the older span as part of a $79.3 million project. Construction began in 2013. The new bridge was opened in 2016, the old one was then permanently closed. While the northbound bridge was kept open briefly, all traffic was moved onto it in 2017 so the old bridge could be demolished and the northbound span could undergo strengthening and a superstructure replacement. Work on the project was considered mostly complete by October 2019.

In April 2016, a project to reconstruct exits 125 into a full interchange commenced. A new southbound exit would be tolled and made exclusively for E-ZPass users; no toll would be added to the new northbound entrance. Also involved in this project was the replacement of the overpasses that carried the parkway over Chevalier Avenue with wider structures, adding an alternate ramp onto Main Street, and constructing a new southbound entrance ramp and demolishing the existing one–this would provide greater access to a new shopping mall in the vicinity that is yet to be completed. It was completed in February 2020.

In 2018, planning began for an improvement project at the northbound ramps at exits 109. The project involved partly winding the ramp and constructing a new ramp to directly allow access to the Lincroft park and ride from the parkway and to allow easier access to Newman Spring Road eastbound. Improvements were also made to the ramps onto the parkway from County Route 520. These include a ramp and overpass being built on Newman Spring Road eastbound, the addition of a traffic light at Schulz Dr, the removal of the U-turn ramp to Half Mile Road and the addition of a left turn signal at the junction to compensate. Bidding for the project was completed in July 2018, and construction began shortly after. It was completed in May 2020.

In June 2018, an improvement project began at the interchange with I-280 and CR 508 (Central Avenue). The project involved widening the entrance ramp to the parkway southbound from one to two lanes and adding a second deceleration lane on the parkway northbound. Due to the addition of the deceleration lane to South Grove St, the northbound toll plaza on the exit was completely removed starting on July 26, 2018, at 10 pm. To accommodate the wider roadway, the overpass carrying Central Avenue over the parkway was also rebuilt. Five nearby bridges were also rehabilitated as part of the project. The project cost approximately $63 million and was completed in August 2022.

=== 2020s ===
On March 24, 2020, the NJTA temporarily suspended cash toll collection due to the COVID-19 pandemic. Drivers without E-ZPass transponders had their license plates photographed at the toll plazas and were sent bills in the mail. Cash collection resumed on May 19 of that year. Also around this time, a new high speed toll gantry was completed at the New Gretna Toll Plaza.

In March 2022, exit 105 was closed in multiple stages so that five of the overpasses, of which some date back to 1954 and others to 1974, could be replaced. The project was completed in late 2023. Additionally a temporary crossover was built at mile marker 108.5 that lasted from March 2023 to February 2024.

In 2020, a project that involved making multiple improvements between mileposts 140 and 143 was commenced. It involves repaving the road, adding new lighting, and constructing a median barrier. It also systematically replaces multiple bridges in between the mile markers, including two that carry traffic over U.S. Route 22 and one that carries traffic over Route 82. It is scheduled to be completed at the end of 2024.

On February 23, 2023, the overpass carrying exit 156 was temporarily closed to traffic. This was because the ramp was in the way of construction on the Passaic River Bridge and needed a retaining wall to be constructed in order to minimize disruption to local communities. This was completed on July 15, and is part of a greater project to reconstruct the Passaic River Bridge, the current superstructure considered functionally obsolete and structurally deficient, in addition to not meeting the greater standards of the New Jersey Turnpike Authority. Work on that part of the project is scheduled for competition in fall 2025.

== Future ==
There are currently plans to rebuild the segment of road between exits 80 and 83. This segment of road lacks shoulders and other safety features, and only exit 82 is a full interchange.

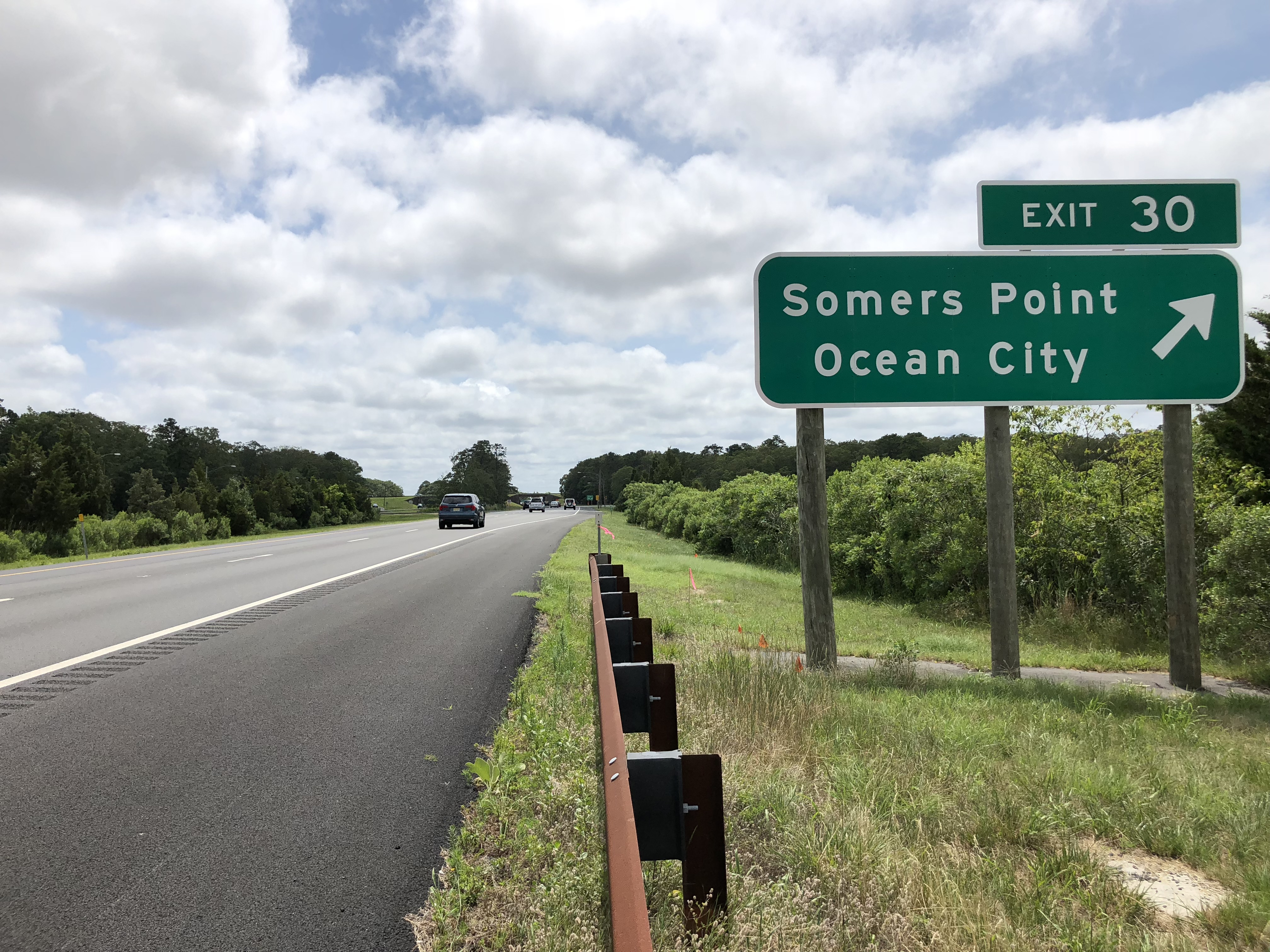
Southbound approaching exit 30 in Somers Point

In 2020, the NJTA announced plans to reconstruct exit 29 into a full interchange because Exit 30, which carries traffic onto the residential street West Laurel Drive, sees chronic congestion during the summer tourist season as it connects to New Jersey Route 52 via an intersection with U.S. Route 9. If this plan were fulfilled, then the exit 30 would have been demolished, meaning that summer traffic would have had to travel to CR 559 via U.S. Route 9 to reach the road. This proposition was heavily criticized by officials and residents in Somers Point and Ocean City, fearing that traffic congestion would simply be relocated rather than eliminated, as well as reducing business that relies on the interchange. They also announced plans to improve other interchanges, such as exits 6, 13, 17, 20, 40, 123, 124, 147, 153, and 168. These upgrades were suggested either to provide full connections or to improve safety by eliminating obsolete designs such as left hand exits or short deacceleration lanes, as well as to increase future capacity. The turnpike authority also has long-term plans to widen the parkway between exit 98 and exit 125, as well as between exit 142 and exit 163, and exit 129 and 142. However, opponents to this project have proposed instead to construct light rail in the median.

== Tolls ==
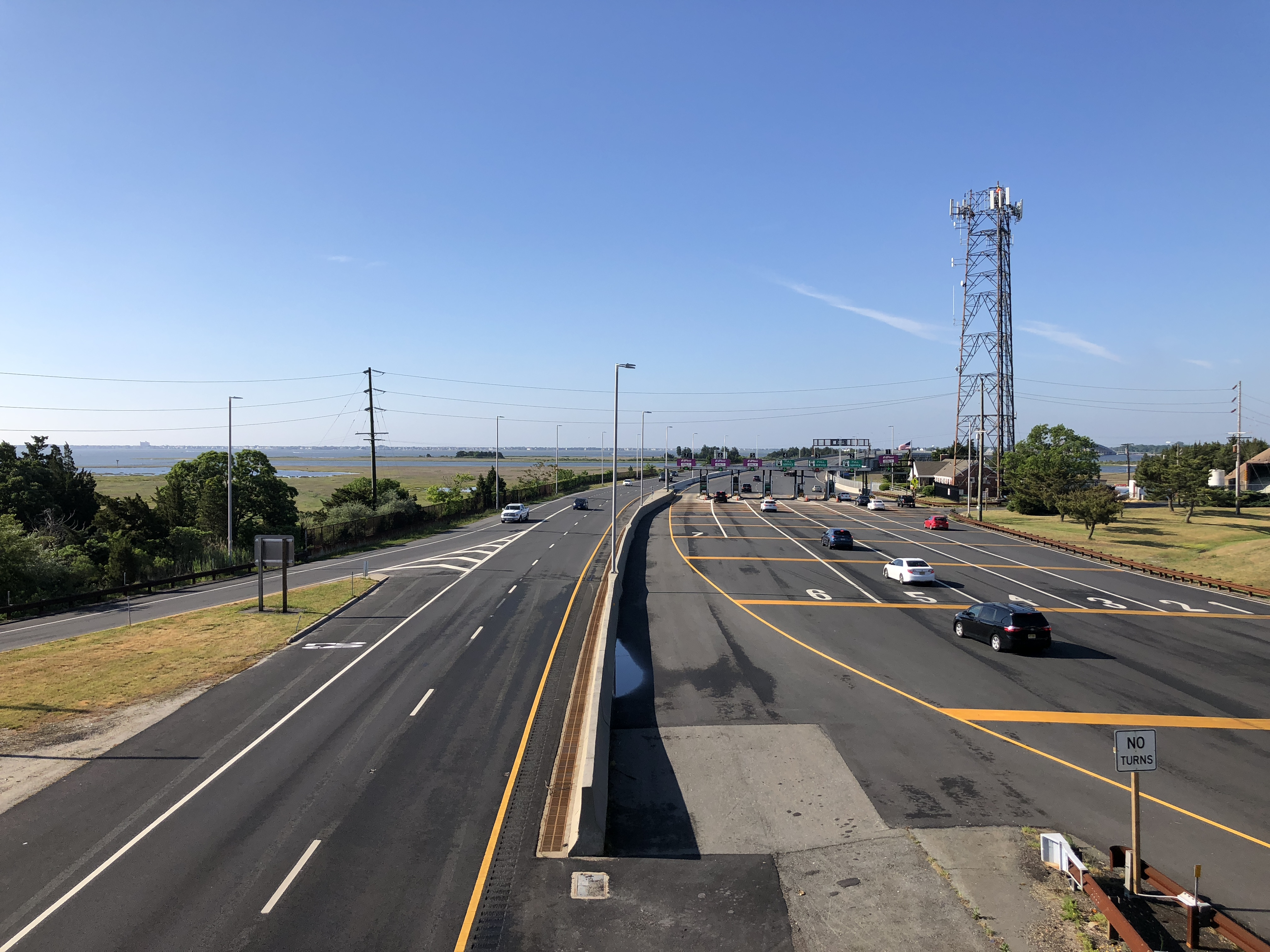
Southbound at the Great Egg Toll Plaza

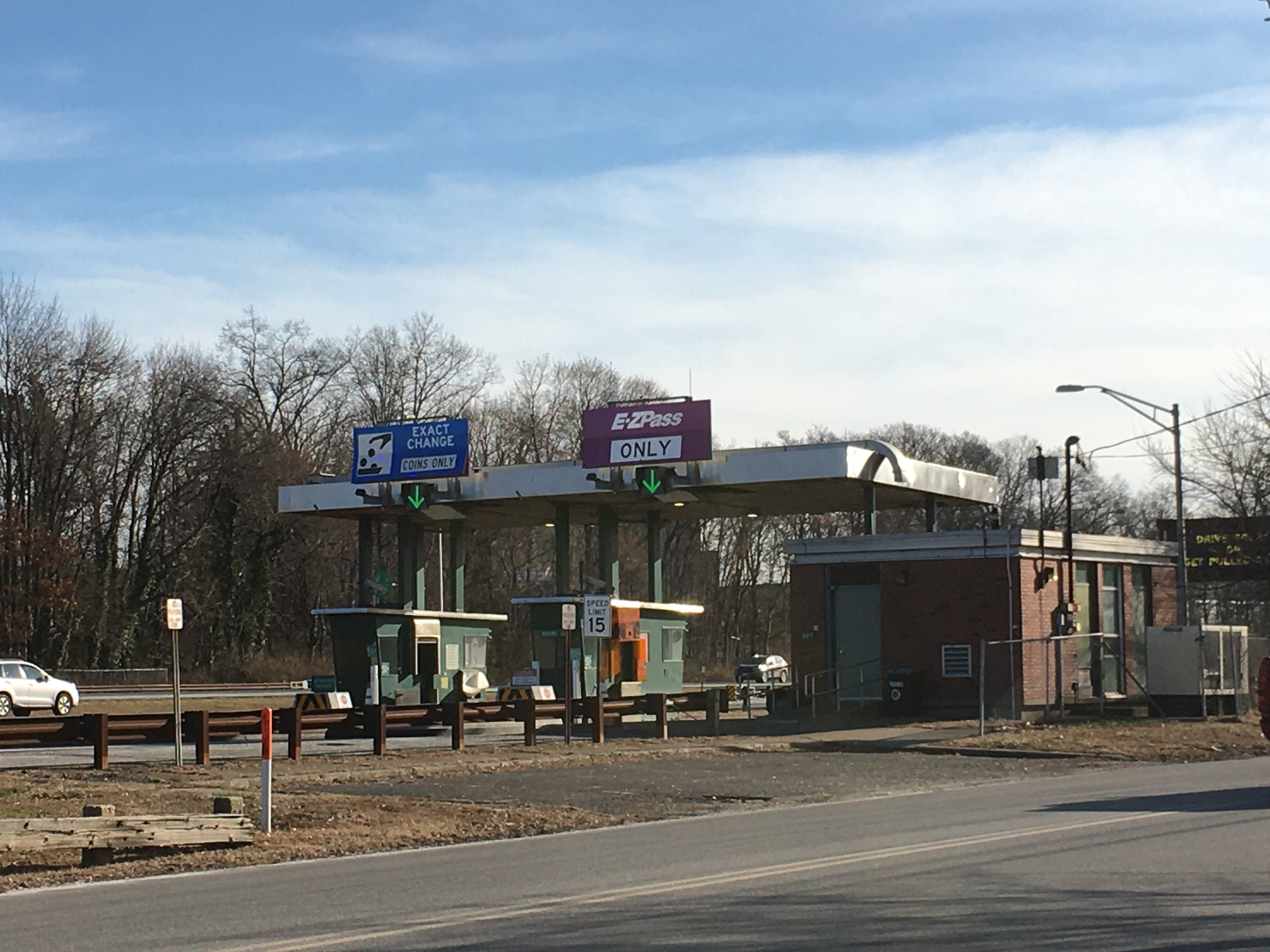
Toll plaza on the southbound entrance ramp at exit 165

The Garden State Parkway uses an open system of tolling in which flat-rate tolls are collected at numerous toll plazas placed along the mainline and at certain interchanges. This contrasts with the New Jersey Turnpike, which uses a ticket system in which tolls are calculated based on distance traveled. Tolls can be paid by using cash or the E-ZPass electronic toll collection system.

As of January 1, 2026, the standard car toll is $2.40 for cash users and $2.25 for E-ZPass users at all mainline toll plazas except for the two-way Toms River Toll Plaza, which has a toll of $1.20 for cash users and $1.13 for E-ZPass users. Some entrances and exits require a toll of either $0.90, $1.20, $1.80, or $2.40 for cash users and $0.79, $1.13, $1.57, or $2.25 for E-ZPass users. Tolls are higher for larger vehicles. Additional E-ZPass discounts are available for off-peak travel, senior citizens, drivers of green vehicles, and trailers.

There are three different lane types at the toll plazas. However, not all plazas have every type of lane at all times.

The first type is full-service lanes. These lanes are staffed and toll collectors can provide change and receipts to drivers.

The second type is exact-change lanes. In these lanes, motorists deposit coins in a basket and each coin is mechanically counted; historically, these lanes also accepted tokens. The Union Toll Plaza was the first to use an automated toll-collection machine; a plaque commemorating this event includes the first quarter collected at its toll booths. Payment of tolls in exact-change lanes has been enforced by photo since 2011. In 2018, exact-change lanes were removed from all mainline toll plazas; they continue to be used for exit and entrance ramp plazas.

The third type of lane is dedicated for vehicles with E-ZPass tags. Some plazas also feature Express E-ZPass lanes, allowing drivers to bypass the toll plaza at highway speeds. Express E-ZPass lanes operate at the Pascack Valley, Raritan, Asbury Park, Toms River, Barnegat, New Gretna and Cape May Toll Plazas. E-ZPass is also accepted in full-service lanes.

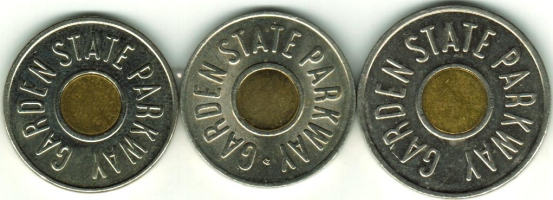
Garden State Parkway tokens, which were discontinued after January 1, 2009

Tokens, available for purchase at full-service toll plaza lanes, were introduced in 1981 at a price of $10 for a roll of 40 tokens; as the toll was $0.25 at the time, most drivers continued to use quarters. However, when the toll was increased to $0.35 in 1989, rolls were priced at 30 tokens for $10; between the slight discount and the convenience of using a single coin, tokens gained in popularity. Additionally, in August of that year, the NJHA installed token only lanes, though it was quickly realized this did not reduce congestion. There were also larger bus tokens, primarily for use by Atlantic City-bound buses. As E-ZPass became more widespread, tokens were phased out. Token sales were discontinued on January 1, 2002, and they were no longer accepted effective January 1, 2009.

On September 27, 2022, the NJTA awarded a $914 million contract to TransCore to convert the parkway into an all-electronic toll road, eliminating the toll booths in the process. Although the agreement has been made, the Turnpike Authority has no set date on when the conversion will be completed.

== Services ==
=== Service areas ===
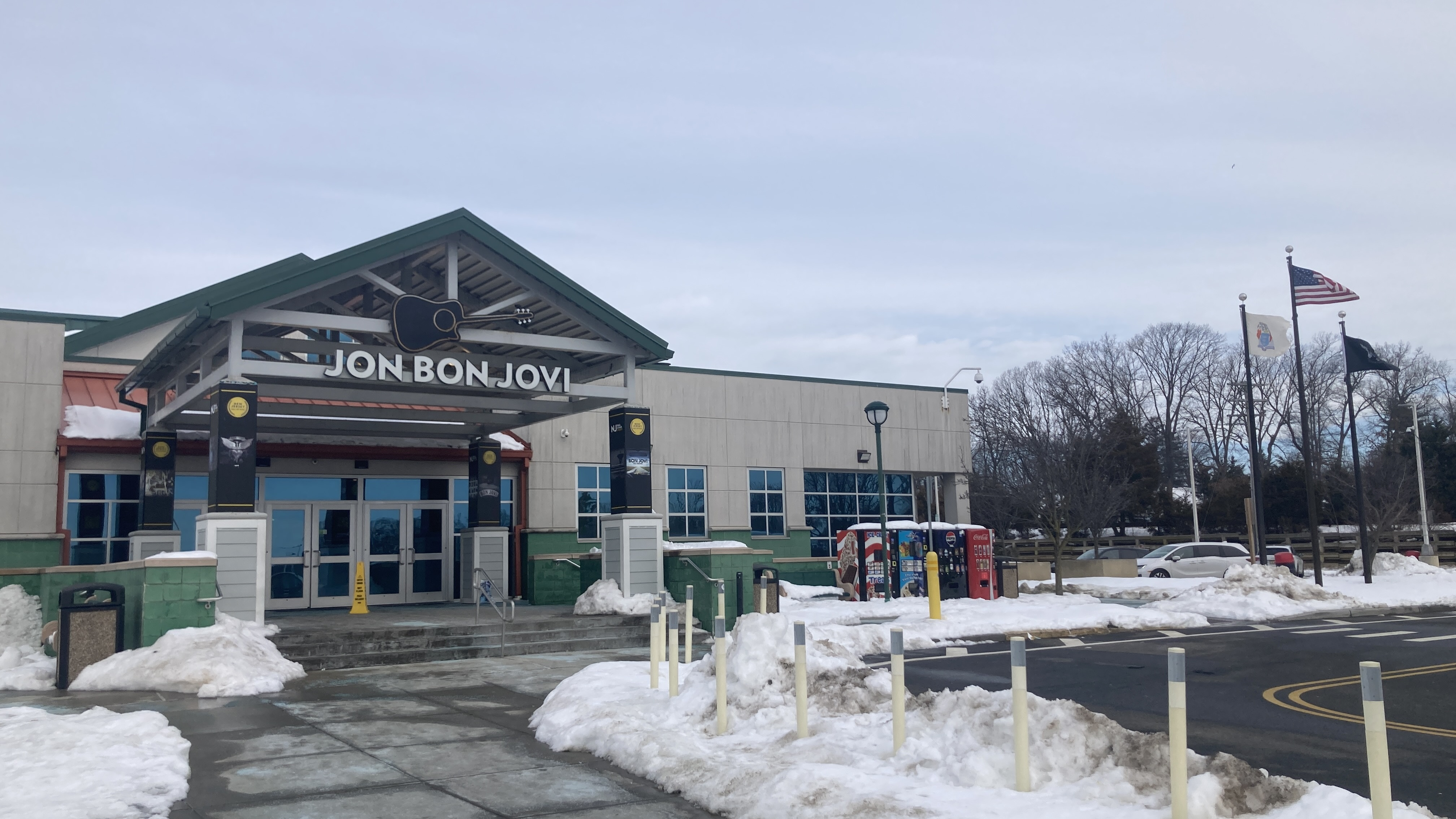
The Jon Bon Jovi Service Area near exit 123

All service areas are located in the center median, unless otherwise noted.

Name	Location	mi	km	Direction	Facilities	Notes
Bruce Willis (formerly Ocean View and originally Seaville)	Dennis Township	18.3	29.5	Both	Convenience store, restrooms, fuel, vending machines, and tourist information	Rebuilt from 2013 to Spring/Summer 2014
New Gretna (Temporary, demolished)	Bass River	53	85	Both	Food, restrooms, fuel	Closed on July 1, 1955, when the permanent service areas were completed. Now site of a Parkway maintenance facility.
Frank Sinatra (formerly Atlantic)	Galloway Township	41.4	66.6	Both	Food, restrooms, fuel, and information	Rebuilt from 2014 to spring 2015
Celia Cruz (formerly Forked River)	Lacey Township	76.0	122.3	Both	Food, restrooms, and fuel	Rebuilt from fall 2019 to summer 2020
Judy Blume (formerly Monmouth)	Wall Township	100.4	161.6	Both	Food, restrooms, and fuel	Rebuilt from fall 2018 to spring 2019
Eatontown	Tinton Falls	107	172	Both	Food, restrooms, and fuel	Closed on July 1, 1955, when a permanent facility was opened. Now site of a maintenance facility.
Jon Bon Jovi (formerly Cheesequake)	Sayreville	124.0	199.6	Both	Food, restrooms, and fuel	
Colonia South	Woodbridge	132.7	213.6	Southbound	Fuel, convenience stores, and restrooms	Not operated by the NJTA
Colonia North	Woodbridge	133.45	214.77	Northbound	Fuel, convenience stores, and restrooms	Not operated by the NJTA
Whitney Houston (formerly Vaux Hall)	Union	142.0	228.5	Northbound	Food, restrooms and fuel	Rebuilt from 2022 to 2023
Connie Chung (formerly Brookdale South)	Bloomfield	153.3	246.7	Southbound	Food, restrooms and fuel	Rebuilt from 2022 to 2023
Larry Doby (formerly Brookdale North)	Bloomfield	153	246	Northbound	Fuel and convenience store	Rebuilt in 2019
James Gandolfini (formerly Montvale)	Montvale	171	275	Both	Food, restrooms, fuel, and information	Renovations began in 2024. Reopened 2025.

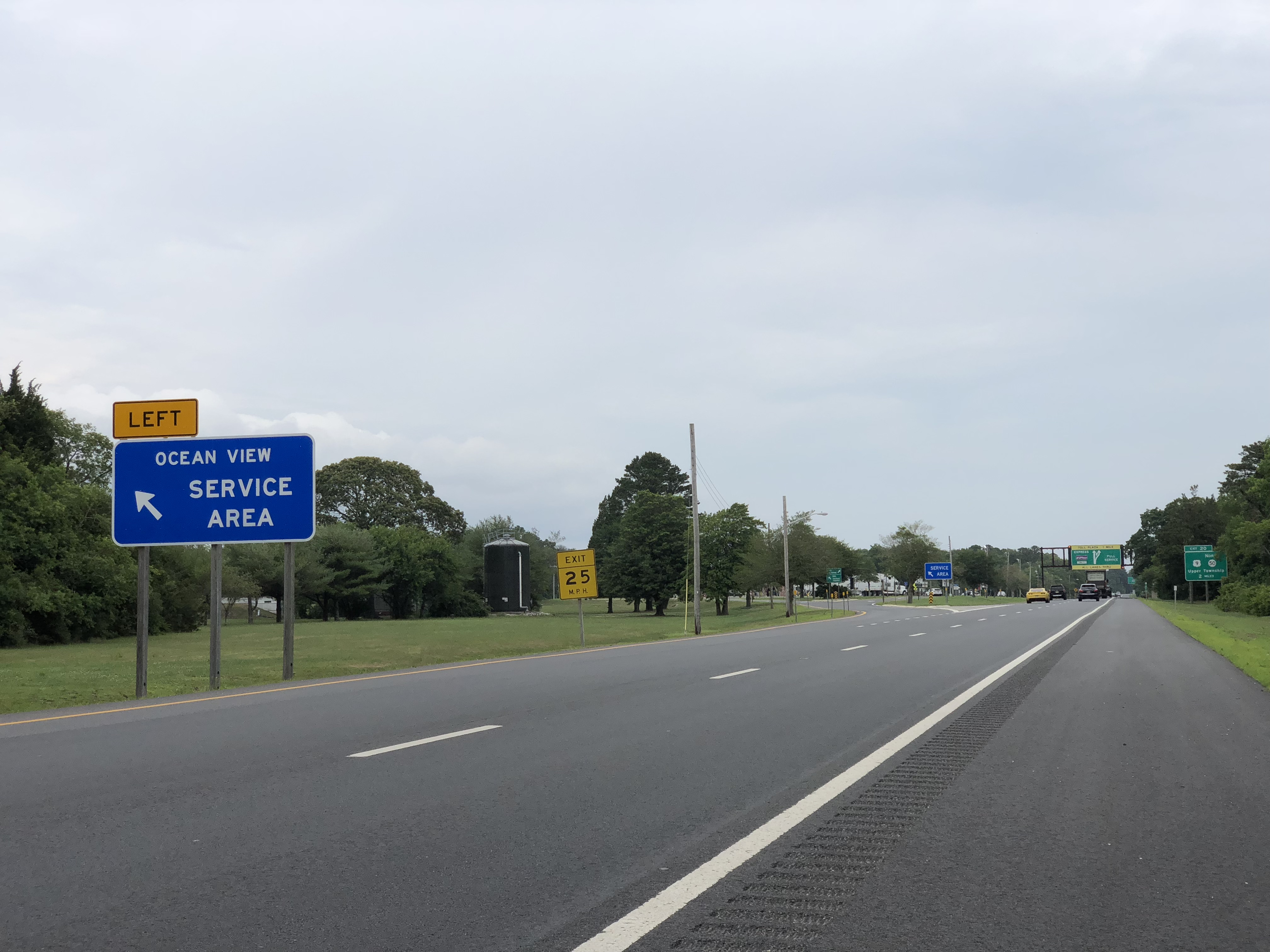
Assurance sign to the Bruce Willis Service Area (formerly Ocean View at the time of photo seen here)

In the 1950s, four petroleum companies were hired to provide gasoline and vehicular necessities—Esso, Texaco, Atlantic, and Cities Service. The Cities Service company was the petroleum provider at Monmouth, Forked River, Atlantic City (Absecon at the time) and Ocean View (Seaville at the time) and offered a service where female employees were hired for those service area showrooms, wore uniforms and were known as the Park-ettes. Their duties included providing directions and other information to motorists as well as rendering odd bits of service such as sewing a missing button on a patron's coat.

On July 27, 2021, the NJTA unanimously voted in favor of renaming the service areas along the Garden State Parkway after New Jerseyans who were inducted into the New Jersey Hall of Fame. The Ocean View service area was originally slated to be named after Toni Morrison, but the NJTA never received written consents and releases; this prompted the New Jersey Hall of Fame to request the service area be named after Bruce Willis instead.

On January 2, 2022, two service areas that were operated by McDonald's in Brookdale and Union were closed after their contract expired in 2021. These services areas were replaced by 2023.

=== Picnic areas ===
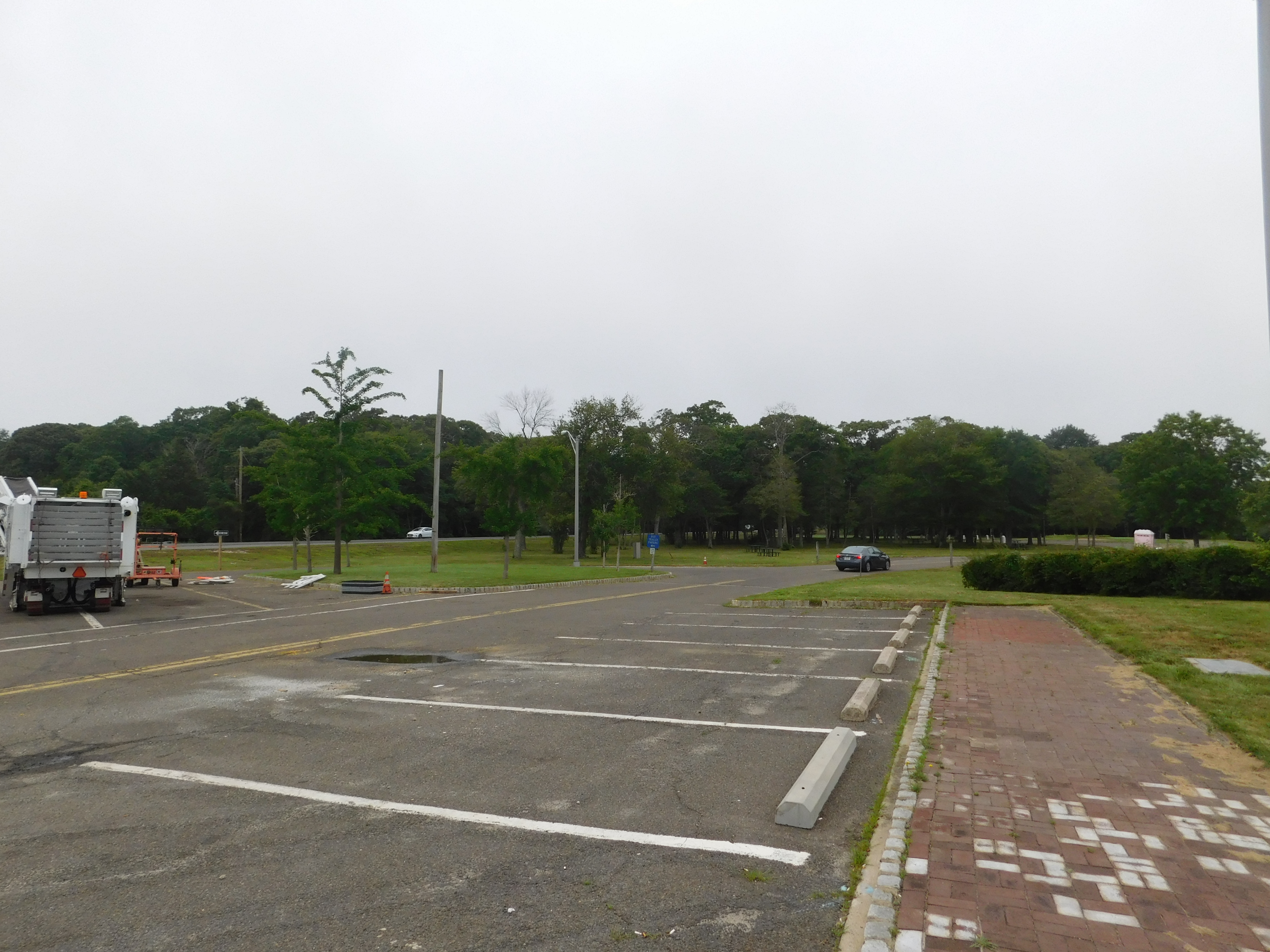
The John B. Townsend Shoemaker Holly picnic area

One of the objectives of the parkway was to become a state park its entire length, and its users would enjoy park-like aesthetics with minimal intrusion of urban scenery. Along the ride, users were permitted to stop and picnic along the roadway to further enjoy the relaxation qualities the parkway had to offer. All picnic areas had tall trees that provided shade and visual isolation from the roadway. Grills, benches, running water, and restrooms were provided. Over time as the parkway transformed into a road of commerce, the picnic areas were closed for a variety of reasons. Their ramp terminals became insufficient to accommodate the high-speed mainline traffic and in addition to the decreasing number of users, the picnic areas were becoming more effective as maintenance yards and were converted as such or closed altogether.

The one remaining picnic area, John B. Townsend Shoemaker Holly in Upper Township, is closed from dusk to dawn. Posted signs within the picnic area prohibit fires and camping.

There were ten operational picnic areas:

Name	Location	Mile	km	Direction	Opened	Closed	Notes
John B. Townsend Shoemaker Holly	Upper Township	22.7	36.5	Both	October 20, 1965	—	John B. Townsend was a physician from Ocean City who became the New Jersey Highway Authority's second Vice Chairman in 1955. The word Shoemaker comes from the last name of the landowner in the way of the parkway's alignment during its initial construction. The term Holly comes from the holly tree that was on Shoemaker's property. The tree is presumed to be 300 years old and one of, if not, the oldest holly tree in the United States. The bathrooms at Shoemaker Holly were demolished in August 2014.
Stafford Forge	Stafford Township	61.6	99.1	Both	May 27, 1955	1990s	
Oyster Creek	Lacey Township	71.3	114.7	Both	May 27, 1955	1980s	The murder of Maria Marshall orchestrated by her husband Robert O. Marshall occurred in the Oyster Creek picnic area on the night of September 7, 1984. The story was made into a novel and television miniseries on NBC.
Double Trouble	Beachwood	79.0	127.1	Southbound	June 1955	February 23, 1961	The NJHA chose to abandon the picnic area due to the outbreak of mosquitoes from a nearby cranberry bog.
Polhemus Creek	Toms River	82.0	132.0	Northbound	June 4, 1955	1980s–1990s	
Herbertsville	Wall Township	94.6	152.2	Southbound	May 27, 1955	1980s	Converted to a maintenance yard of the same name and heavy vehicle weigh station.
Telegraph Hill	Holmdel	115.8	186.4	Both	April 24, 1957	2010s	The picnic area was off exit 116, next to the PNC Bank Arts Center.
Glenside	Woodbridge	130.2	209.5	Southbound	November 1, 1950	October 23, 1987	Closed due to illegal use for sex and drugs.
Madison Hill	Clark	134.9	217.1	Northbound	November 1, 1950	1980s–1990s	Madison Hill was an overlook constructed as part of the original Route 4 Parkway.
Tall Oaks	Clark	137.0	220.5	Southbound	June 29, 1950	July 1988	Closed due to illegal use for sex and drugs; converted to maintenance yard

=== Emergency assistance ===
On the Garden State Parkway, the emergency assistance number is #GSP, which is #477 in number form. Towing and roadside assistance are provided from authorized garages. The New Jersey State Police is the primary police agency that handles calls for service on the parkway. New Jersey State Police Troop D serves the Garden State Parkway, with stations in Galloway Township, Holmdel, and Bloomfield. Other emergency services such as fire and first aid are usually handled by the jurisdictions in which that section of the parkway passes.

== Exit list ==
The parkway was the first highway in the United States to use mileage-based exit numbers. Historically, the exit numbers on the northbound and southbound roadways were not symmetrical. The New Jersey Highway Authority considered each as a separate road and as a result, many exits had non-matching numbers.

County	Location	mi	km	Old exit	New exit	Destinations	Notes
Cape May	Lower Township	0.00	0.00			Route 109 south – Cape May	Continuation south; at-grade intersection
Cape May	Lower Township	0.1	0.16		0	Route 109 north to US 9 – North Cape May	Southbound exit and northbound entrance; to Cape May–Lewes Ferry
Cape May	Middle Township	3.90	6.28		4	Route 47 – Wildwood, Wildwood Crest, Rio Grande	Tolled northbound exit and southbound entrance; signed as exits 4A (south) and 4B (north) southbound; signed for The Wildwoods northbound, Wildwood/Wildwood Crest southbound
Cape May	Middle Township	6.54	10.53		6	Route 147 – North Wildwood, Whitesboro	Southbound exit and northbound entrance
Cape May	Middle Township	8.40	13.52		9	US 9 / Shell Bay Avenue	
Cape May	Middle Township	9.90	15.93		10	Cape May Court House, Stone Harbor	Access via CR 657
Cape May	Middle Township	11.04	17.77		11	Crest Haven Road (CR 609) to US 9	No northbound entrance; serves Cape May County Park & Zoo
Cape May	Middle Township	11.80	18.99		12	Crest Haven Road (CR 609)	Northbound entrance only
Cape May	Middle Township	11.80	18.99		12	US 9	Southbound entrance only
Cape May	Middle Township	13.60	21.89		13	To US 9 – Swainton, Avalon	Access via CR 601; southbound left entrance
Cape May	Dennis Township	17.50	28.16		17	Sea Isle City, Dennis Township	Southbound exit and northbound entrance; access via CR 625
Cape May	Upper Township	19.38	31.19	Cape May Toll Plaza (northbound)			
Cape May	Upper Township	20.25	32.59		20	US 9 / Route 50 north – Upper Township	Northbound left exit and southbound entrance; southern terminus of Route 50
Cape May	Upper Township	25.34	40.78		25	US 9 south (CR 623) – Ocean City	Southern end of US 9 concurrency; serves Corson's Inlet State Park
Great Egg Harbor Bay		27.77	44.69	Great Egg Harbor Bridge			
Atlantic	Somers Point	28.78	46.32	Great Egg Toll Plaza (southbound)			
Atlantic	Somers Point	28.90	46.51		29	US 9 north – Somers Point, Ocean City	Northern end of US 9 concurrency; northbound exit and southbound entrance
Atlantic	Somers Point	30.00	48.28		30	Somers Point, Ocean City	Southbound exit (tolled) and northbound entrance; access via West Laurel Drive
Atlantic	Egg Harbor Township	35.82	57.65		36	US 40 / US 322 – Northfield, Pleasantville	Northbound exit and southbound entrance; access via CR 563/CR 651
Atlantic	Egg Harbor Township	36.08	58.07		36	CR 563 – Northfield, Margate City	Southbound exit and northbound entrance
Atlantic	Egg Harbor Township	36.59	58.89		37	To US 40 / US 322 – Pleasantville	Southbound exit and northbound entrance; access via CR 608; to CR 563
Atlantic	Egg Harbor Township	37.23	59.92		38	A.C. Expressway – Atlantic City, Camden	Signed as exits 38A (east) and 38B (west); exits 7S-N on A.C. Expressway
Atlantic	Galloway Township	40.04	64.44		40	US 30 east – Absecon, Atlantic City	Southbound exit and northbound entrance
Atlantic	Galloway Township	41.70	67.11		41	CR 561 – Galloway, Pomona	Serves Stockton University; Pomona not signed southbound
Atlantic	Galloway Township	43.98	70.78		44	CR 575 / CR 561 Alt. – Port Republic, Smithville, Pomona	Serves Stockton University; signed for Port Republic/Smithville northbound, Pomona southbound
Atlantic	Port Republic	48.29	77.72		48	US 9 south – Port Republic, Smithville	Southern end of US 9 concurrency; southbound exit and northbound entrance
Burlington	Bass River Township	50.67	81.55		50	US 9 north – New Gretna, Tuckerton	Northern end of US 9 concurrency; northbound exit and southbound entrance
Burlington	Bass River Township	52.70	84.81		52	New Gretna	Southbound exit and northbound entrance; access via CR 654
Burlington	Bass River Township	53.54	86.16	New Gretna Toll Plaza (northbound)			
Ocean	Little Egg Harbor Township	58.69	94.45		58	CR 539 – Little Egg Harbor, Whiting, Tuckerton	Signed for Whiting northbound, Tuckerton southbound
Ocean	Stafford Township	64.11	103.18		63	Route 72 – Long Beach Island, Pemberton	Signed as exits 63A (east) and 63B (west) northbound
Ocean	Barnegat Township	67.81	109.13		67	CR 554 – Barnegat, Pemberton	Signed as exits 67A (east) and 67B (west) southbound; Pemberton not signed northbound
Ocean	Barnegat Township	68.61	110.42	Barnegat Toll Plaza (southbound)			
Ocean	Ocean Township	70.45	113.38		69	CR 532 – Waretown	Tolled southbound exit and northbound entrance
Ocean	Lacey Township	75.34	121.25		74	Forked River	Tolled southbound exit and northbound entrance; access via CR 614
Ocean	Berkeley Township	77.40	124.56		77	Berkeley	Tolled southbound exit and northbound entrance; access via CR 618/CR 619
Ocean	South Toms River	80.85	130.12		80	US 9 south / CR 530 / CR 619 south – Beachwood, South Toms River	Southern end of US 9 concurrency; northern terminus of CR 619; southbound exit and northbound entrance
Ocean	Toms River	81.85	131.72		81	Lakehurst Road (CR 527) – Toms River	
Ocean	Toms River	82.35	132.53		82	Route 37 – Seaside Heights, Lakehurst	Signed as exits 82 (east) and 82A (west); serves Island Beach State Park
Ocean	Toms River	84.10	135.35		83	US 9 north / Route 166 south / CR 571 – Lakewood	Northern end of US 9 concurrency; northern terminus of Route 166; no southbound exit
Ocean	Toms River	84.72	136.34	Toms River Toll Plaza			
Ocean	Lakewood Township	89.36	143.81	88	89A	Route 70 – Lakehurst, Brick, Point Pleasant	Tolled southbound exit and northbound entrance; signed as exits 89A (east) and 89B (west) southbound
Ocean	Lakewood Township	90.18	145.13	88	89B (NB); 89C (SB)	CR 528 – Lakewood	Tolled southbound exit and northbound entrance
Ocean	Brick Township	91.10	146.61		90	CR 549 south – Brick	Northbound exit and southbound entrance
Ocean	Brick Township	92.62	149.06		91	CR 549 – Lakewood, Brick, Herbertsville, Point Pleasant	Tolled southbound exit and northbound entrance; signed as exits 91B (south) and 91A (north) southbound
Monmouth	Wall Township	98.23	158.09	96–97A	98	I-195 west / Route 138 east / Route 34 – Belmar, Trenton	Tolled southbound exit and northbound entrance; eastern terminus of I-195; western terminus and exits 35A-36 on Route 138
Monmouth	Tinton Falls	101.24	162.93	100	100A	Route 33 east – Ocean Grove, Bradley Beach	Bradley Beach not signed southbound
Monmouth	Tinton Falls	101.49	163.33	100A	100B	Route 66 east – Asbury Park	Northbound exit and southbound entrance
Monmouth	Tinton Falls	101.74	163.73	100A (SB); 100B (NB)	100B (SB); 100C (NB)	Route 33 west – Freehold	
Monmouth	Tinton Falls	103.15	166.00		102	Neptune, Asbury Park	Southbound exit and northbound entrance; access via CR 16
Monmouth	Tinton Falls	103.96	167.31	Asbury Park Toll Plaza (northbound)			
Monmouth	Tinton Falls	104.20	167.69	Southern terminus of local–express lanes			
Monmouth	Tinton Falls	106.12– 106.39	170.78– 171.22		105	Route 18 / Route 36 east – New Brunswick, Eatontown, Long Branch, Tinton Falls	Tolled northbound entrance; southbound exit and northbound entrance from express lanes; no northbound access to Route 18 south; no southbound access to Route 18 from express lanes; all trucks must exit; signed for New Brunswick northbound, Tinton Falls southbound
Monmouth	Middletown Township	110.14	177.25		109	CR 520 – Red Bank, Lincroft	Tolled southbound exit and northbound entrance
Monmouth	Middletown–Holmdel township line	113.88	183.27		114	Holmdel, Middletown	Tolled southbound exit and northbound entrance; access via CR 52
Monmouth	Holmdel Township	115.85	186.44		116	PNC Bank Arts Center	Exit number only signed at gore; to New Jersey Vietnam Veterans' Memorial
Monmouth	Hazlet	118.50	190.71		117	Route 35 / Route 36 south – Hazlet, Keyport	Tolled southbound exit and northbound entrance; southbound exit and northbound entrance from express lanes; northern terminus of Route 36
Monmouth	Aberdeen Township	118.79	191.17	117A	118	Aberdeen	Access via CR 3; southbound exit (tolled) and entrance
Middlesex	Old Bridge Township	121.13	194.94		120	Laurence Harbor, Matawan	Access via CR 626; to Cheesequake State Park
Middlesex	Sayreville	124.64	200.59		123	US 9 south – Sayreville, Old Bridge	Southbound exit and northbound entrance
Middlesex	Sayreville	124.99	201.15		124	Main Street (CR 670)	Southbound exit and northbound entrance
Middlesex	Sayreville	125.28	201.62	Northern terminus of local–express lanes			
Middlesex	Sayreville	125.68	202.26	Raritan Toll Plaza (southbound)			
Middlesex	Sayreville	126.36	203.36		125	US 9 south / Route 35 / Chevalier Avenue – Sayreville, South Amboy	E-ZPass-only toll on southbound exit; signed for U.S. Route 9/Route 35/Sayreville/South Amboy northbound, Chevalier Avenue southbound
Middlesex	Raritan River	127.33	204.92	Driscoll Bridge			
Middlesex	Woodbridge Township	128.22	206.35	127A	127	US 9 north / Route 440 to I-287 north – Woodbridge, Staten Island	Northbound exit and southbound entrance
Middlesex	Woodbridge Township	129.50	208.41	128	129	I-95 Toll / N.J. Turnpike – New York City, Trenton, Philadelphia To US 9 / Route 440 / I-287 north – Woodbridge, Perth Amboy	Exit 11 on I-95 / Turnpike; no southbound access to US 9/Route 440/I-287; signed for Trenton northbound, Philadelphia southbound
Middlesex	Woodbridge Township	130.63	210.23		130	US 1 – Trenton, Newark	Southbound exit and northbound entrance; signed as exits 130A (north) and 130B (south)
Middlesex	Woodbridge Township	131.33	211.36		131A	Wood Avenue South (CR 649 north)	Signed as exit 131 southbound
Middlesex	Woodbridge Township	131.83	212.16		131B	Metropark	Northbound exit and southbound entrance; access via CR 657
Middlesex	Woodbridge Township	131.97	212.39	131	132	Route 27 – Iselin, Metuchen	
Union	Clark	136.22	219.22		135	Clark, Westfield	Access via CR 613
Union	Cranford	137.59	221.43		136	Linden, Roselle	Access via CR 607/CR 615
Union	Cranford	138.74	223.28		137	Route 28 – Roselle Park, Elizabeth, Cranford	Signed for Roselle Park southbound, Elizabeth northbound
Union	Kenilworth	140.34	225.86		138	CR 509 – Kenilworth	
Union	Union Township	141.10	227.08		139	Roselle Park, Union	No southbound exit; signed as exits 139A (Roselle Park) and 139B (Union); access via CR 619
Union	Union Township	141.70	228.04		140	US 22 east / Route 82 east – Hillside	Northbound exit and southbound entrance
Union	Union Township	141.70	228.04		140	US 22 west / Route 82 – Elizabeth, Somerville, Union	Southbound exit and northbound entrance; signed as exits 140A (Route 82 west) and 140B (US 22/Route 82 east)
Union	Union Township	142.10	228.69		141	US 22 east / Vauxhall Road (CR 630)	Southbound exit and northbound entrance; US 22 not signed
Union	Hillside	142.66	229.59	Union Toll Plaza (northbound)			
Union	Hillside	142.80– 142.90	229.81– 229.98		142	I-78 – Springfield, Newark	Tolled northbound entrance; signed as exits 142A (east) and 142B (west); exit 52 on I-78; to Holland Tunnel
Union	Hillside	143.00	230.14	142; 142A	142C	Maplewood	Northbound exit and southbound entrance; access via North Union Avenue
Essex	Irvington	144.00	231.75		143	To Route 124 west – Irvington, Maplewood, Hillside	Access via CR 602/CR 603; signed as exits 143A (Hillside), 143B (Maplewood), and 143C (Route 124) southbound
Essex	Irvington	145.98	234.93		144	CR 510 (South Orange Avenue)	Tolled northbound exit and southbound entrance
Essex	East Orange	146.93– 147.15	236.46– 236.81	145–145A	145	I-280 / CR 508 – Newark, The Oranges	Tolled southbound entrance; exit 12B on I-280; northbound access to CR 508 is via CR 509
Essex	East Orange			146		Springdale Avenue – East Orange, Newark Area	Former northbound exit and southbound entrance; closed January 12, 1966
Essex	East Orange	148.44	238.89		147	East Orange	Southbound exit and northbound entrance; access via Springdale Avenue
Essex	Bloomfield	149.20	240.11		148	CR 506 Spur / CR 509 – Bloomfield, Glen Ridge	Tolled northbound exit and southbound entrance; Glen Ridge not signed southbound
Essex	Bloomfield	150.22	241.76	148A	149	CR 506 – Glen Ridge, Belleville	Southbound exit and northbound entrance
Essex	Bloomfield	150.66	242.46	Essex Toll Plaza (southbound)			
Essex	Bloomfield	151.11	243.19	149A	150	Hoover Avenue (CR 651)	Northbound exit and southbound entrance
Essex	Bloomfield	152.40	245.26		151	Montclair, Nutley	Tolled southbound exit and northbound entrance; access via CR 655
Passaic	Clifton	154.06– 154.45	247.94– 248.56		153	Route 3 to US 46 west – Secaucus, Wayne	Tolled southbound exit and northbound entrance; signed as exits 153A (east) and 153B (west) northbound; no southbound access to Route 3 west; to Meadowlands Complex and Lincoln Tunnel
Passaic	Clifton	155.91– 156.40	250.91– 251.70		154	US 46 east – Clifton	Northbound exit and southbound entrance
Passaic	Clifton	155.91– 156.40	250.91– 251.70	155P	155A	Route 19 north to I-80 west – Paterson	Northbound left exit and southbound entrance; southern terminus of Route 19
Passaic	Clifton	155.91– 156.40	250.91– 251.70		154	US 46 west – Clifton	Southbound exit and northbound entrance
Passaic	Clifton	156.68	252.15	155	155B	Passaic	Northbound exit and southbound entrance; access via CR 702
Passaic	Clifton	158.19	254.58		156	Route 20 north – Elmwood Park	Northbound exit and southbound entrance; access via US 46 east; southern terminus of Route 20
Bergen	Elmwood Park	158.87	255.68		157	US 46 east – Garfield	Northbound exit and southbound entrance
Bergen	Elmwood Park	158.87	255.68		157	US 46 west to Route 20 north – Garfield	Southbound exit and northbound entrance
Bergen	Saddle Brook	160.00– 160.35	257.50– 258.06	158	159	I-80 – Saddle Brook, Paterson, George Washington Bridge	Tolled northbound exit; no northbound access to I-80 west; access to Saddle Brook via CR 67; signed for Paterson southbound, George Washington Bridge northbound; exit 62A on I-80
Bergen	Saddle Brook	160.46	258.24	Bergen Toll Plaza (northbound)			
Bergen	Paramus	161.53	259.96		160	To Route 208 north – Fair Lawn, Hackensack	Northbound exit and southbound entrance; access via CR 62
Bergen	Paramus	161.88	260.52		161	Route 4 east – Paramus	Northbound exit and southbound entrance
Bergen	Paramus	163.06– 163.29	262.42– 262.79		163	Route 17 to Route 4 – Mahwah, Paramus, George Washington Bridge	Same-directional access only; to Meadowlands Sports Complex
Bergen	Paramus	164.94	265.45		165	Ridgewood, Oradell	Tolled northbound exit and southbound entrance; access via CR 80; signed as exits 165A (Oradell) and 165B (Ridgewood)
Bergen	Paramus	165.93	267.04		166	Washington, Westwood	Southbound exit and northbound entrance; access via CR 110
Bergen	Washington Township	166.25	267.55	Pascack Valley Toll Plaza (southbound)			
Bergen	Washington Township	167.46	269.50		168	CR 502 – Washington, Westwood	Northbound exit and southbound entrance
Bergen	Woodcliff Lake	170.15	273.83		171	Woodcliff Lake, Saddle River	Northbound exit and southbound entrance; access via CR S73
Bergen	Montvale	171.52	276.03		172	Montvale, Park Ridge	Northbound exit and southbound entrance; access via CR 94
Bergen	Montvale	172.40	277.45			To I-87 / I-287 / New York Thruway – New York City, Albany	Northern terminus; New York state line; access via G.S. Parkway Connector
1.000 mi = 1.609 km; 1.000 km = 0.621 mi: Closed/former; Concurrency terminus; Incomplete access; Tolled
