= U.S. Route 322 in New Jersey =

Highway in New Jersey

U.S. Route 322
- US 322 highlighted in red

Route information
- Maintained by NJDOT, DRPA, Gloucester County, and Atlantic County
- Length: 62.64 mi (100.81 km)
- Existed: 1936–present

Major junctions
- West end: US 322 at the Pennsylvania state line in Bridgeport
- US 130 in Logan Township; I-295 in Logan Township; N.J. Turnpike in Woolwich Township; Route 45 in Harrison Township; Route 55 near Glassboro; Route 42 in Monroe Township; US 40 in Hamilton Township; G.S. Parkway in Egg Harbor Township; US 9 in Pleasantville; A.C. Expressway in Atlantic City
- East end: Atlantic Avenue / Pacific Avenue in Atlantic City

Location
- Country: United States
- State: New Jersey
- Counties: Gloucester, Atlantic

Highway system
- United States Numbered Highway System; List; Special; Divided; New Jersey State Highway Routes; Interstate; US; State; Scenic Byways
← Route 303	→ Route 324
← Route 50	→ Route 52

U.S. Route 322 (US 322) is a spur of U.S. Route 22, running from Cleveland, Ohio, east to Atlantic City, New Jersey. The easternmost segment of the route in New Jersey runs 62.64 miles (100.81 km) from the Commodore Barry Bridge over the Delaware River in Logan Township, Gloucester County, where it continues southeast to Atlantic Avenue and Pacific Avenue in Atlantic City, Atlantic County. The portion of the route between the Commodore Barry Bridge and Route 42 in Williamstown is mostly a two-lane undivided road that is concurrently signed with County Route 536 (CR 536), passing through Mullica Hill and Glassboro. From Williamstown, US 322 follows the Black Horse Pike, a four-lane road, southeast to Atlantic City. In Hamilton Township, Atlantic County, US 322 forms a concurrency with U.S. Route 40, continuing with that route all the way to Atlantic City. US 322 intersects several major roads including U.S. Route 130 and Interstate 295 (I-295) in Logan Township, the New Jersey Turnpike in Woolwich Township, Route 55 in Harrison Township, Route 42 in Williamstown, Route 50 and U.S. Route 40 in Hamilton Township, the Garden State Parkway in Egg Harbor Township, and U.S. Route 9 in Pleasantville.

East of Williamstown, US 322 follows the Black Horse Pike, a turnpike between Camden and Atlantic City that was created in 1855. Pre-1927 Route 18S was designated along the portion of the current route east of McKee City in 1923, with the US 40 designation along this portion following in 1926. In 1927, Route 18S became Route 48 and Route 42 was designated along the road between Williamstown and McKee City. US 322 was extended to New Jersey in 1936, running from a ferry dock on the Delaware River in Bridgeport east to Williamstown, where it followed Route 42 and U.S. Route 40/Route 48 to Atlantic City. In 1938, Route 55 was legislated along US 40/US 322 in Atlantic City while in 1939, US 322 between the ferry dock and Route 44 (now US 130) became Route S44 and the route between there and Route 42 became Route 51. In 1953, the state highway designations were removed from US 322. After the Commodore Barry Bridge opened in 1974, the old approach to the ferry dock became Route 324. In 1960, a freeway was proposed for US 322 in Gloucester County, running from the site of the Commodore Barry Bridge to Williamstown. This $59.6 million proposal was canceled by the 1970s due to diversion of funds to mass transit. Subsequent proposals for freeways in 1983 and 1995 also failed. A bypass of Mullica Hill was completed in 2012 for US 322 in order to relieve traffic through that town; the former alignment is now unsigned US 322 Business (US 322 Bus.).

== Route description ==
=== Gloucester County ===
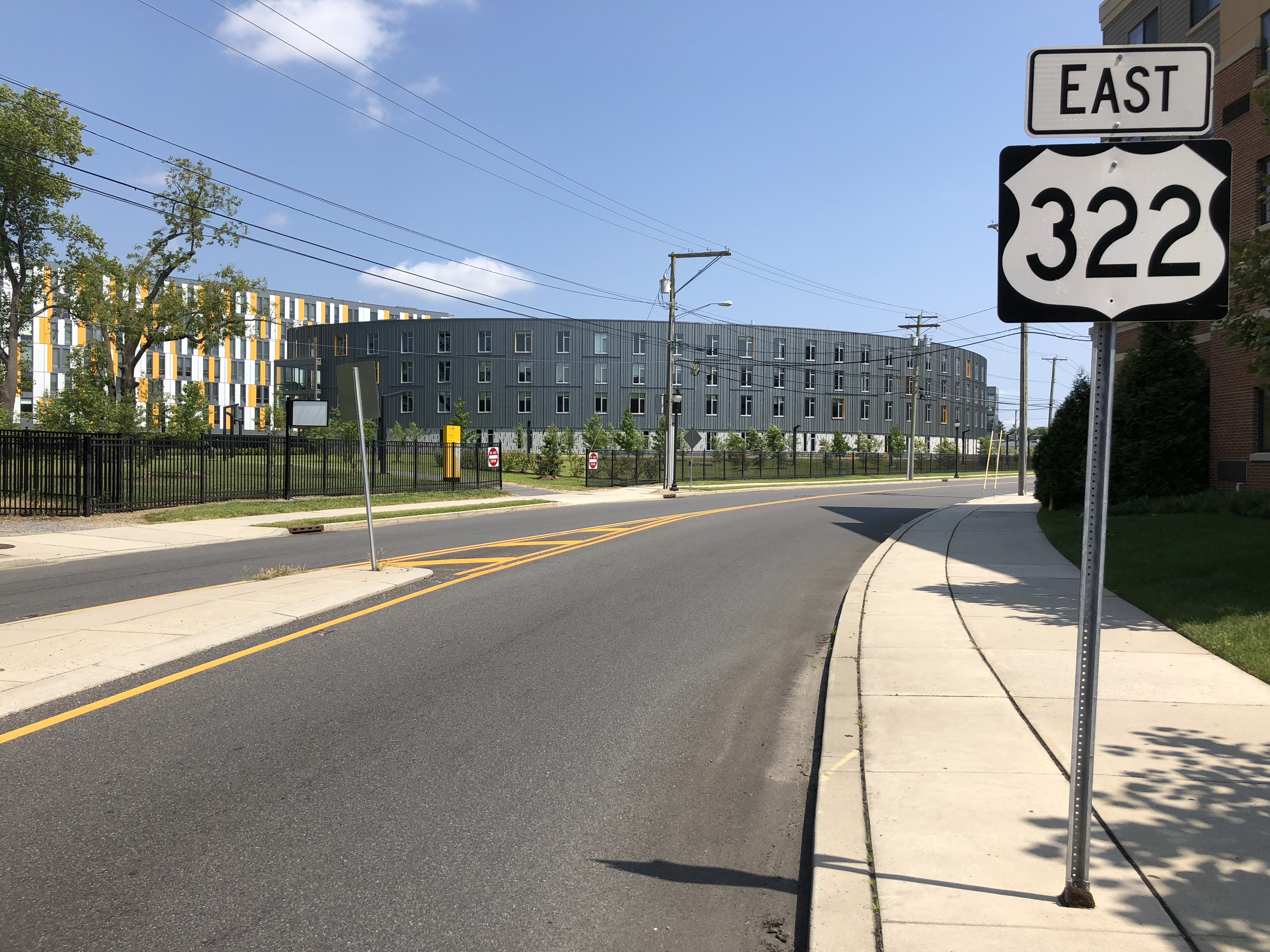
View east along US 322 at Rowan Boulevard in Glassboro

US 322 enters New Jersey from Chester, Pennsylvania on the Commodore Barry Bridge over the Delaware River. Upon entering New Jersey, the highway runs concurrently with County Route 536. The road heads southeast into swampy areas of Logan Township as a five-lane road maintained by the Delaware River Port Authority, eventually becoming a six-lane divided highway as it passes over Springers Lane, an access road to Route 324, and comes to the westbound toll plaza for the bridge. A short distance later, US 322 has a cloverleaf interchange with U.S. Route 130 and continues south through the community of Bridgeport as it narrows into a two-lane undivided road known as Swedesboro-Bridgeport Road. It passes over Conrail Shared Assets Operations' (CSAO) Penns Grove Secondary and continues through rural areas of farms and woods prior to an interchange with Interstate 295, at which point the road widens into a four-lane divided highway. After I-295, US 322 continues through a small industrial park, and then makes a turn to the east and crosses into Woolwich Township. At this point, the road narrows back into a two-lane undivided road with no name. Here, the route crosses the Southern Railroad of New Jersey's Salem Branch and County Route 551 prior to an interchange with the New Jersey Turnpike.

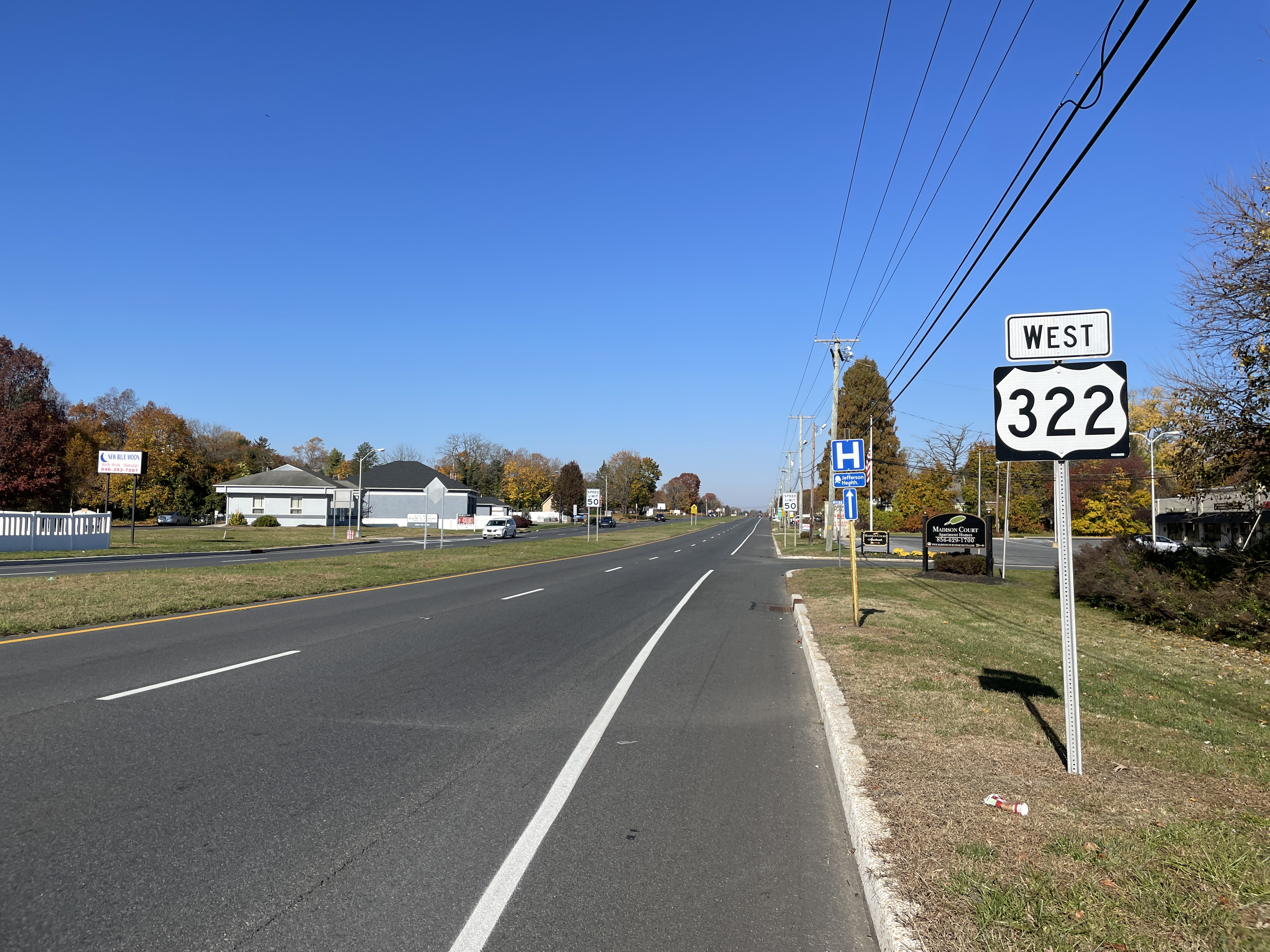
US 322 westbound in Williamstown

Past the New Jersey Turnpike, US 322 starts to curve southeast and crosses into Harrison Township, where it passes suburban neighborhoods as Bridgeport-Mullica Hill Road and jurisdiction of the road is transferred to Gloucester County. It continues into Mullica Hill, where it intersects Route 45 and unsigned US 322 Bus. At this point, CR 536 turns south along with US 322 Bus./Route 45 and US 322 heads along the Mullica Hill Bypass concurrent with unsigned CR 536A, running southeast through wooded areas with some farm fields. At the end of the bypass, the route intersects US 322 Bus./CR 536 again and turns east onto Mullica Hill Road, again becoming concurrent with CR 536. US 322 continues through a mix of woods, farms, and homes, passing through Richwood. The route interchanges with Route 55 where state jurisdiction resumes. At the interchange, US 322 is briefly a four-lane road, and passes north of Inspira Medical Center Mullica Hill before entering Glassboro. In Glassboro, the route passes residential areas prior to crossing CSAO's Vineland Secondary and bisecting the campus of Rowan University, where it comes to a roundabout at Rowan Boulevard. A short distance later, US 322 crosses County Route 553 and becomes West Street, before coming to Route 47. Here, it turns south to form a concurrency with that route on three-lane Delsea Drive, passing more homes and businesses. US 322 splits from Route 47 by heading east on High Street, a two-lane road, and enters wooded areas with some development and farmland.

After exiting Glassboro for Monroe Township, US 322 continues east and crosses County Route 555 prior to reaching Williamstown, where the road passes residential and business development. Here, US 322 turns north, while County Route 536 splits from the route by continuing southeast on Main Street. A short distance after the split, US 322 intersects the southern terminus of Route 42 (Black Horse Pike), at which point it turns southeast onto Black Horse Pike. At this intersection, County Route 536 Spur continues to the north. On the Black Horse Pike, a four-lane divided highway line with businesses, the route soon crosses County Route 536 before leaving the Williamstown area and becoming a four-lane undivided road. US 322 continues southeast through predominantly forested areas with occasional development, intersecting County Route 538 and crossing the Southern Railroad of New Jersey's Southern Running Track line. In 2006, an average of 10,615 vehicles used the road daily in Gloucester County.

=== Atlantic County ===
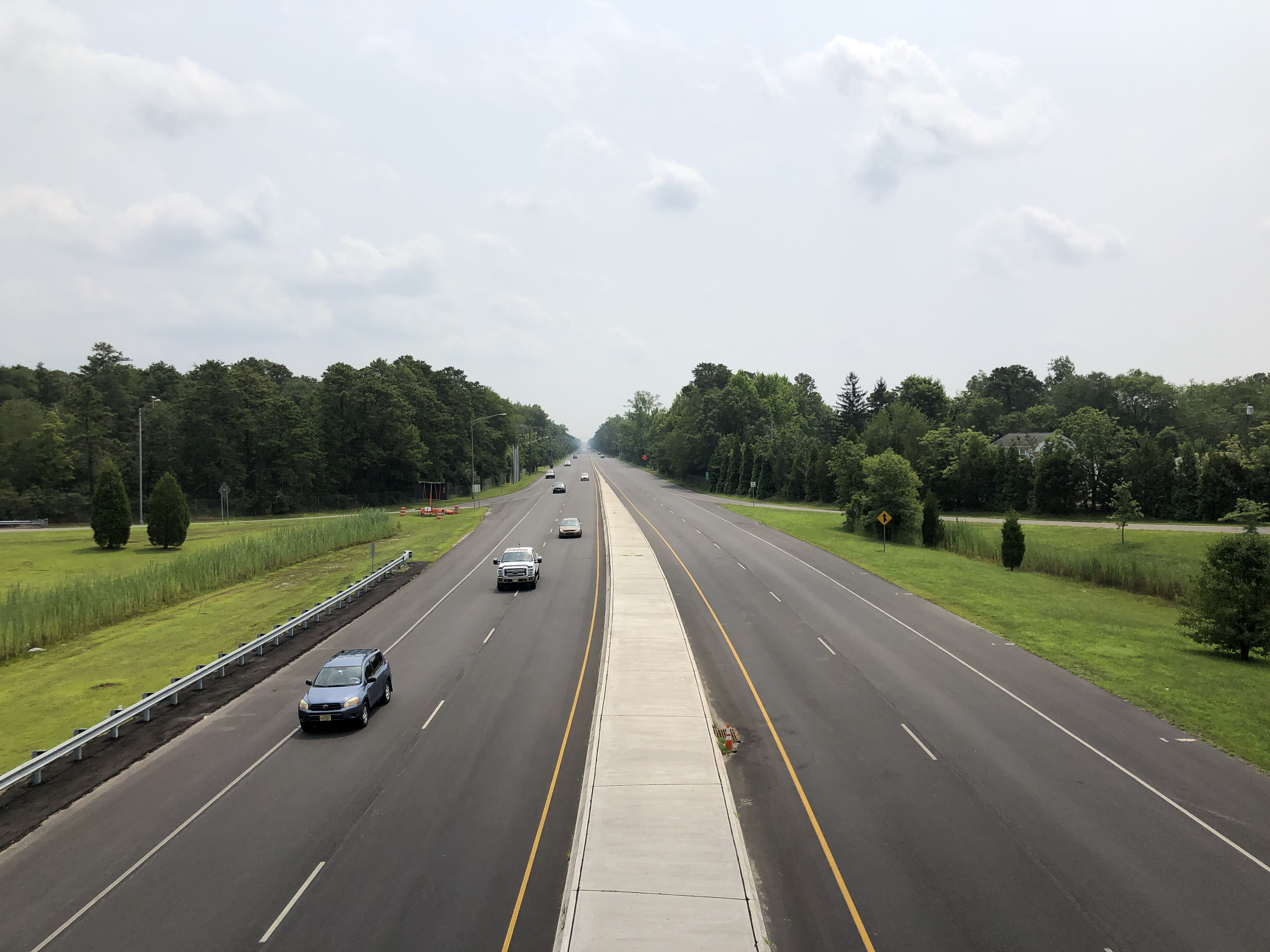
US 322 eastbound at Route 50 in Hamilton Township

Entering Folsom in Atlantic County, US 322 passes a couple lakes and some wooded residences before coming to a bridge over the Beesleys Point Secondary railroad line operated by the Cape May Seashore Lines railroad before an interchange with Route 54, where the route has a median. Past this interchange, the road continues southeast through heavily forested areas to an intersection with the southern terminus of Route 73 (signed as County Route 561 Spur). After this intersection, US 322 turns south and enters Hamilton Township, where it encounters County Route 559 at a traffic circle that has been modified to have US 322 run through it. After passing more woods and a clearing for farms, the road widens into a four-lane divided highway and has an interchange with Route 50. A short while after, the route enters a residential and commercial area, passing by Atlantic Cape Community College before heading to the south of the Hamilton Mall. Here, US 322 intersects U.S. Route 40, which merges onto the Black Horse Pike.

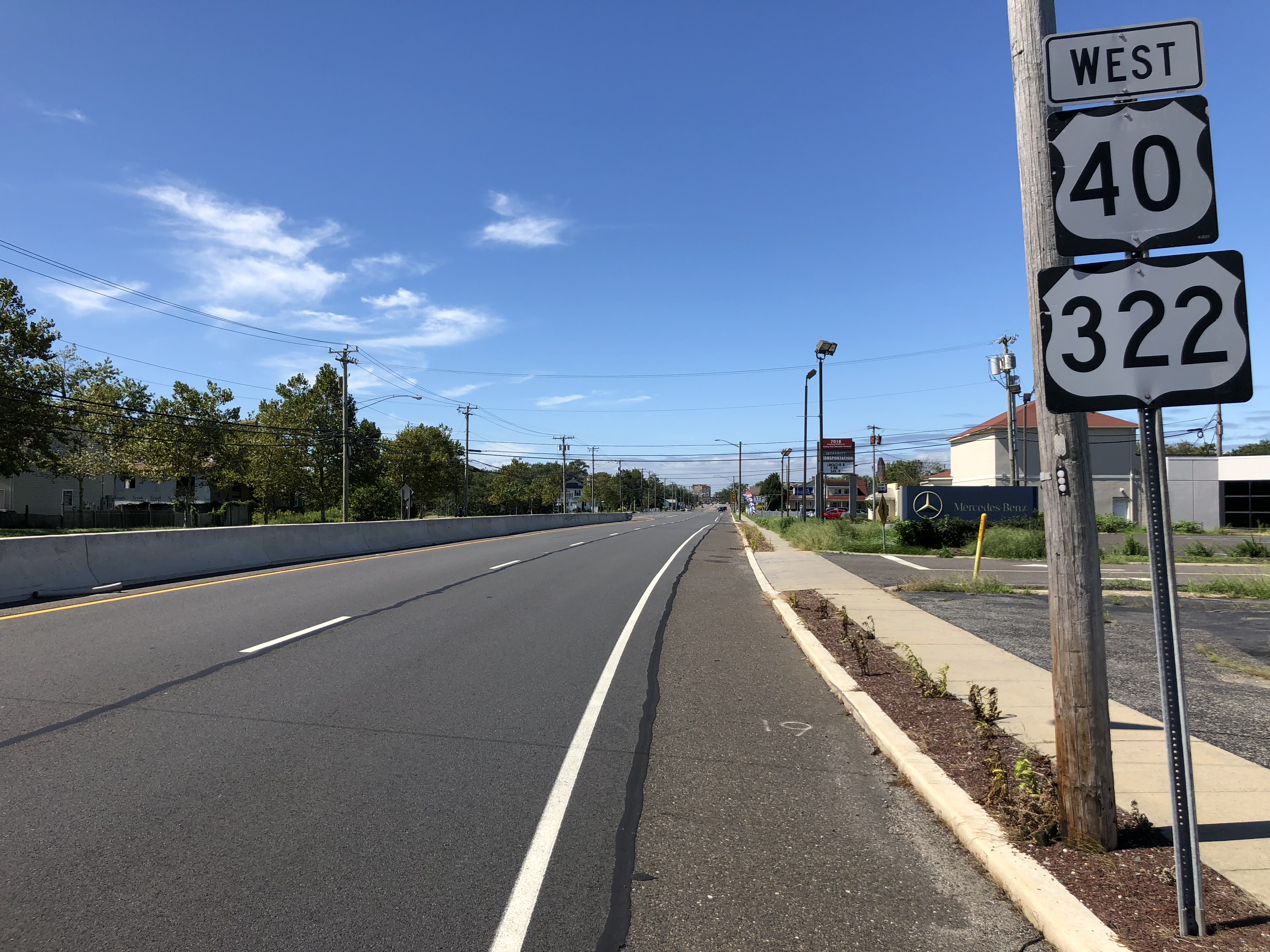
US 40/US 322 westbound in Egg Harbor Township

The two routes continue to the southeast through business areas, meeting County Route 575 and a ramp to the Atlantic City Expressway. CR 575 turns east to form a concurrency with US 40/US 322. The road enters Egg Harbor Township, with CR 575 splitting from US 40/US 322 by turning to the south. The route passes more wooded residential and commercial areas, as well as the Storybook Land amusement park, before intersecting County Route 563. US 40/US 322 forms a concurrency with that route and passes through a business district that includes the Harbor Square shopping center. CR 563 splits from the road by continuing southeast and the Black Horse Pike heads east to an interchange with the Garden State Parkway. The only direct ramp present is between the Black Horse Pike westbound and the Garden State Parkway northbound, with all other movements provided by CR 563. Past here, US 40/US 322 continues east past more businesses, crossing County Route 651 before entering Pleasantville. In Pleasantville, the road crosses U.S. Route 9. Past this intersection, the roadway passes under the Somers Point Bike Path. Upon crossing County Route 585, the Black Horse Pike continues past residences as an undivided road, crossing back into Egg Harbor Township. The road passes more businesses, closely paralleling the Atlantic City Expressway before entering Atlantic City. Here, the name becomes Albany Avenue and it comes to a pair of ramps that provide access to and from the Black Horse Pike eastbound and the Atlantic City Expressway westbound. US 40/US 322 enters marshland, crossing the Great Thorofare onto Great Island, where it has an interchange providing access to Atlantic City High School that also has U-turn ramps, before passing over the Beach Thorofare. Past this bridge, the road passes between businesses to the west and the closed Bader Field airport and Surf Stadium to the east. US 40/US 322 crosses the Inside Thorofare on a drawbridge and continues as a county maintained road to its end at Atlantic Avenue and Pacific Avenue, one block from the boardwalk. In 2006, an average of 6,910 vehicles used the road daily in Atlantic County.

== History ==
=== Before 1953 ===
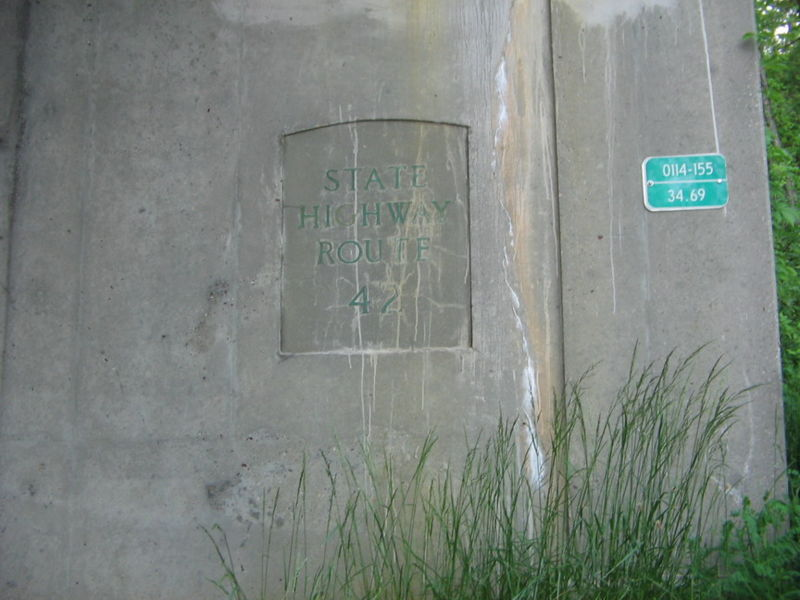
The former Route 42 designation of the Black Horse Pike shown on the Route 54 bridge in Folsom.

What is now U.S. Route 322 east of the Route 42 junction was established in 1855 as the Black Horse Pike, a turnpike that ran from Camden to Atlantic City via Blackwoodtown. In 1902, the Atlantic County Board of Freeholders authorized the construction of a toll-free highway from Pleasantville to Albany Avenue in Atlantic City, which was completed in 1905. In 1923, the portion of present US 322 along the US 40 concurrency was designated as a part of pre-1927 Route 18S, a route that was built to connect Penns Grove to Atlantic City. As a result of the creation of the U.S. Highway System in 1926, U.S. Route 40 was also signed along the alignment Route 18S. A year later, in the 1927 New Jersey state highway renumbering, the current alignment of US 322 through New Jersey was designated as a part of Route 42 between Williamstown and McKee City, while Route 48 replaced the Route 18S designation along the portion between McKee City and Atlantic City. The portion of US 40/US 322 in Atlantic City was legislated as Route 55 in 1938.

Route 51 (1939-1953)

In 1936, US 322 was extended into New Jersey, running from a ferry dock on the Delaware River in Bridgeport and continuing east from there through Mullica Hill and Glassboro to Williamstown, where it followed Route 42 to McKee City and U.S. Route 40/Route 48 to Atlantic City. In 1939, the portion of US 322 between the ferry dock and Route 44 (now U.S. Route 130) was legislated as Route S44, a spur of Route 44, while the route between there and Route 42 in Williamstown was legislated as Route 51. It is also this section between Bridgeport and Williamstown that was not in state highway jurisdiction at the time.

=== 1953 to present ===
In the 1953 New Jersey state highway renumbering, several state highways concurrent with US 322 were removed, including Route S44, Route 51, Route 42, Route 48, and Route 55. The section of US 322 between former US 130 and Route 42 became state highway jurisdiction in 1955 after a state takeover. This portion was also designated as part of County Route 536 with the creation of the 500-series county routes in 1952.

When the Commodore Barry Bridge opened in 1974 and replaced the ferry across the Delaware River, US 322 was moved to the new bridge approach and the former piece of the route to the ferry dock became Route 324.

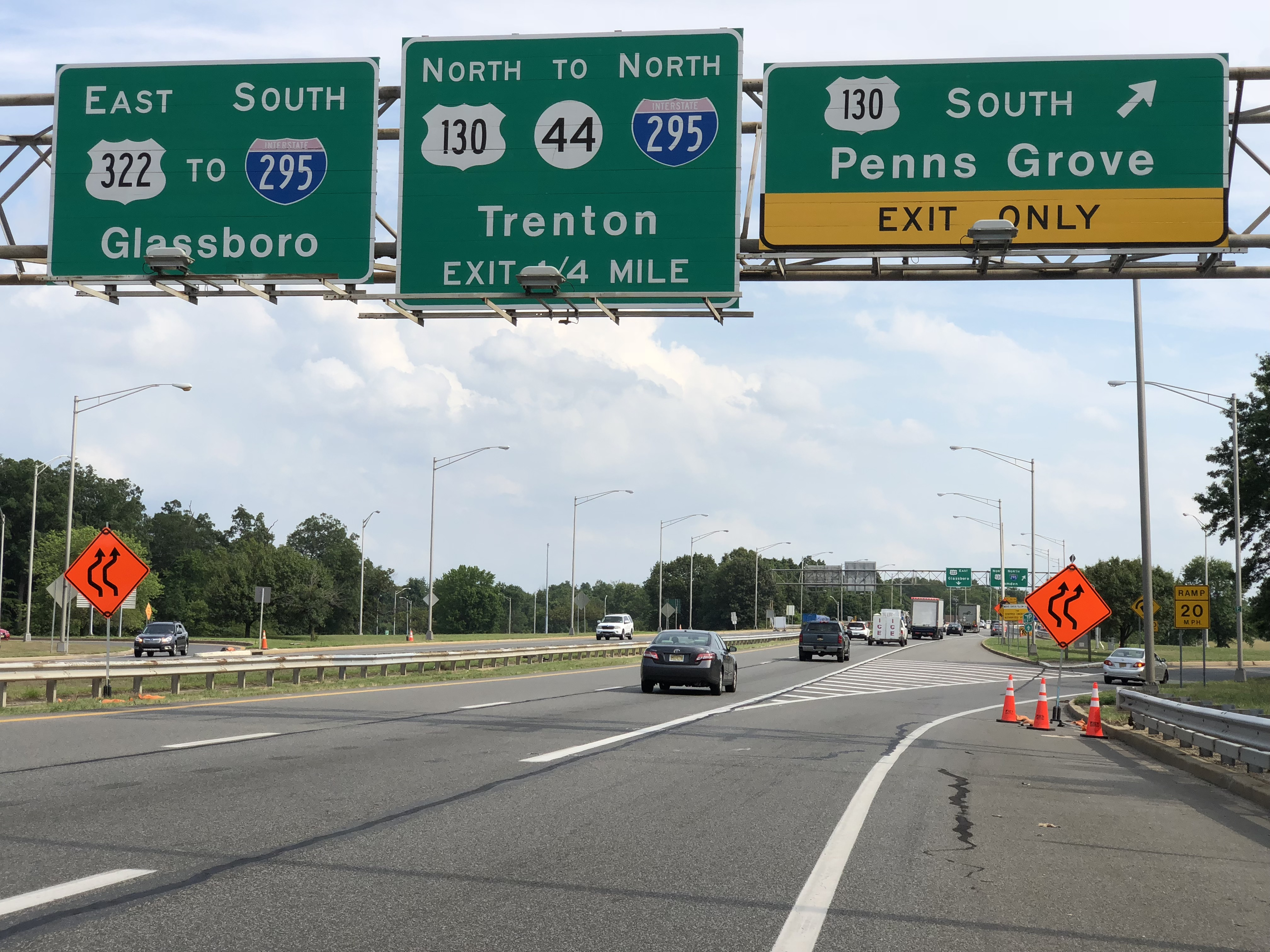
US 322 eastbound at US 130 in Logan Township

In the 1960s, plans started forming for a freeway along the US 322 corridor in Gloucester County. A parkway had been planned in 1932 to run from Bridgeport east to the planned Camden-Atlantic City Parkway as part of a network of such roads proposed for the Philadelphia area; however, it was never built. The freeway, which was planned to connect the then-proposed Commodore Barry Bridge to Route 42 in Williamstown, was projected to cost $59.6 million. This freeway was proposed to be incorporated into the Interstate Highway System in 1970; however, this was denied. By the end of the 1970s, the US 322 freeway was canceled due to the desire to use highway funds for mass transit.

Plans resurfaced for a freeway along the US 322 corridor in 1987, when Congressman William J. Hughes made a proposal for a road running from the New Jersey Turnpike to the Atlantic City Expressway, with access to the Route 55 freeway. This proposal was never built though.

In 1995, the New Jersey Turnpike Authority announced plans to build a toll road between the Commodore Barry Bridge and the Atlantic City Expressway, connecting with I-295, the New Jersey Turnpike, and Route 55. This proposal resulted from increased traffic volume on US 322 after the completion of Interstate 476 in Pennsylvania. However, this proposal was soon canceled due to the possible destruction it would cause to residences, businesses, and the environment.

The Cardiff Circle along US 40/US 322 at CR 563 and CR 608 in Egg Harbor Township was eliminated in a $3.7 million project completed in 2002.

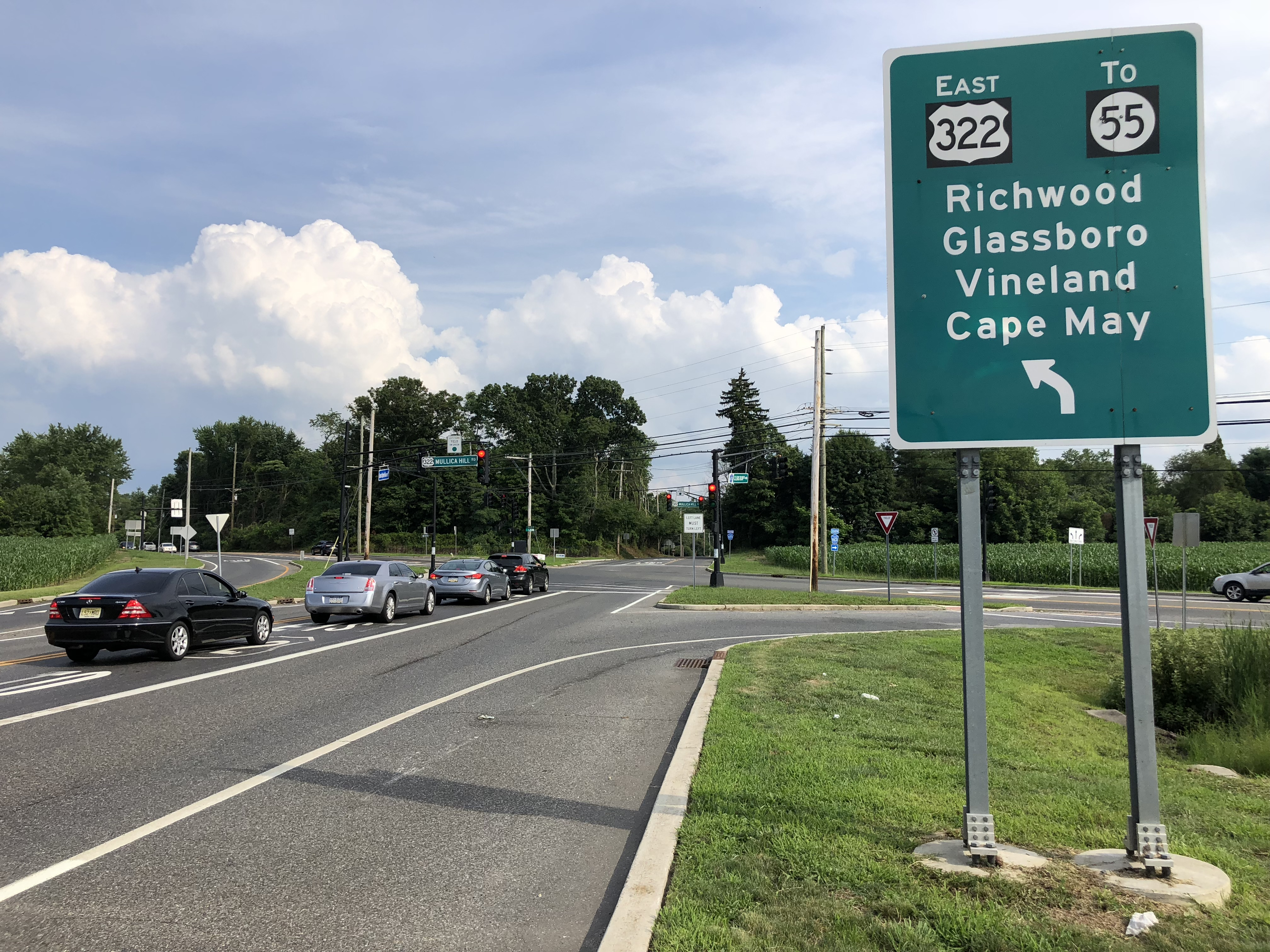
US 322 eastbound at the east end of the Mullica Hill Bypass, where it intersects the eastern terminus of unsigned US 322 Bus.

In December 2008, jurisdiction of US 322 from the Woolwich–Harrison township line to the Route 55 interchange and a 0.35-mile-long (0.56 km) segment within Glassboro was transferred from the state highway agency, the New Jersey Department of Transportation, to Gloucester County.

Construction of a bypass around Mullica Hill began in December 2010 in order to relieve severe traffic congestion through the town. The route originally went through the town's historical district, where it briefly joined Route 45. The new alignment removes the concurrency, so that the routes merely cross at an intersection. The road was estimated to cost $12 million, and is described by a freeholder as being the "largest infrastructure project that has ever been undertaken in Gloucester County." In addition to the bypass, a portion of US 322 in the Mullica Hill area was widened. Construction of the bypass portion initially awaited approval from the New Jersey Historical Sites Council to determine if it would impact the Mullica Hill Historic District. The Mullica Hill Bypass opened to traffic on January 11, 2012. With the rerouting of US 322 onto the Mullica Hill Bypass, the former alignment of US 322 to Mullica Hill is now US 322 Bus., however it is unsigned.

In 2021, a 1.2-mile-long (1.9 km) portion of US 322 in Logan Township was widened to four lanes, resulting in a minimum of two continuous lanes in each direction between I-95 in Chester and Stone Meetinghouse Road in Swedesboro, just east of I-295.

== Major intersections ==
County	Location	mi	km	Destinations	Notes
Delaware River		0.00	0.00	US 322 west – Pennsylvania	Continuation into Pennsylvania
Delaware River		0.00	0.00	Commodore Barry Bridge (westbound toll; cash or E-ZPass)	
Gloucester	Logan Township	2.18	3.51	US 130 to I-295 north / Route 44 – Penns Grove, Camden, Trenton	Interchange; last westbound exit before toll
Gloucester	Logan Township	3.95	6.36	I-295	Exits 11A-B on I-295; no eastbound access to I-295 north
Gloucester	Woolwich Township	6.99	11.25	CR 551 (Kings Highway) – Woodbury, Swedesboro	
Gloucester	Woolwich Township	7.81	12.57	N.J. Turnpike – New York City, Wilmington	Exit 2 on N.J. Turnpike
Gloucester	Harrison Township	10.82	17.41	US 322 Bus. east / Route 45 (CR 536 east) – Woodbury, Mullica Hill	Eastern end of CR 536 concurrency; western end of CR 536A concurrency
Gloucester	Harrison Township	12.12	19.51	US 322 Bus. west (CR 536 west) – Mullica Hill	Eastern end of CR 536A concurrency; western end of CR 536 concurrency
Gloucester	Harrison Township	15.05	24.22	Route 55 – Malaga, Bellmawr	Exits 50A-B on Route 55
Gloucester	Glassboro	17.55	28.24	CR 553 (Main Street)	
Gloucester	Glassboro	17.67	28.44	Route 47 north (Delsea Drive)	Western end of Route 47 concurrency
Gloucester	Glassboro	18.08	29.10	Route 47 south (Delsea Drive)	Eastern end of Route 47 concurrency
Gloucester	Monroe Township	22.87	36.81	CR 555 (North Tuckahoe Road) – Cross Keys, Vineland	
Gloucester	Monroe Township	24.10	38.79	CR 536 east	Eastern end of CR 536 concurrency
Gloucester	Monroe Township	24.38	39.24	Route 42 north (Black Horse Pike) / CR 536 Spur north to A.C. Expressway – Camden, Sicklerville	Southern termini of Route 42 and CR 536 Spur
Gloucester	Monroe Township	24.56	39.53	CR 536 (Poplar Street / New Brooklyn Road) – Waterford, Glassboro	
Gloucester	Monroe Township	30.02	48.31	CR 538 west (Coles Mill Road)	Eastern terminus of CR 538
Atlantic	Folsom	34.55	55.60	Route 54 – Hammonton, Trenton, Buena, Millville	Interchange
Atlantic	Folsom	36.79	59.21	Route 73 north / CR 561 Spur north (Mays Landing Road) to A.C. Expressway – Philadelphia	Southern terminus of Route 73/CR 561 Spur
Atlantic	Hamilton Township	41.26	66.40	CR 559 (Weymouth Road) – Mays Landing, Hammonton	Modified roundabout
Atlantic	Hamilton Township	45.92	73.90	Route 50 – Mays Landing, Egg Harbor City	Interchange
Atlantic	Hamilton Township	50.09	80.61	US 40 west (Harding Highway) – Mays Landing	Western end of US 40 concurrency
Atlantic	Hamilton Township	50.29	80.93	CR 575 north (Wrangleboro Road) to A.C. Expressway – Pomona	Western end of CR 575 concurrency
Atlantic	Egg Harbor Township	52.21	84.02	CR 575 south (English Creek Avenue) – English Creek	Eastern end of CR 575 concurrency
Atlantic	Egg Harbor Township	55.30	89.00	CR 563 north (Tilton Road)	Western end of CR 563 concurrency
Atlantic	Egg Harbor Township	55.70	89.64	CR 563 south (Tilton Road) – Margate City, Ocean City	Eastern end of CR 563 concurrency
Atlantic	Egg Harbor Township	55.78	89.77	G.S. Parkway north to A.C. Expressway	Exit 36 on G.S. Parkway
Atlantic	Pleasantville	57.45	92.46	US 9 – Absecon, Somers Point	
Atlantic	Pleasantville	57.82	93.05	CR 585 (Main Street)	
Atlantic	Atlantic City	60.31– 60.49	97.06– 97.35	A.C. Expressway west – Philadelphia	Westbound exit and eastbound entrance; exit 2 on A.C. Expressway
Atlantic	Atlantic City	61.01	98.19	Atlantic City High School To A.C. Expressway west	Interchange with U-turn ramps; ACE signed on eastbound U-turn ramp
Atlantic	Atlantic City	62.64	100.81	Atlantic Avenue / Pacific Avenue – Midtown, Uptown, Marina US 40 ends	Eastern terminus; eastern terminus of US 40
1.000 mi = 1.609 km; 1.000 km = 0.621 mi: Concurrency terminus; Incomplete access; Tolled

== See also ==
U.S. Route 322
Previous state: Pennsylvania	New Jersey	Next state: Terminus
