= U.S. Route 40 in New Jersey =

Section of U.S. Highway in New Jersey, United States

U.S. Route 40
- US 40 highlighted in red

Route information
- Maintained by NJDOT, DRBA, NJTA, and Atlantic County
- Length: 64.32 mi (103.51 km)
- Existed: 1926–present
- Tourist routes: Pine Barrens Byway

Major junctions
- West end: I-295 / US 40 at the Delaware state line in Pennsville Township
- I-295 / US 130 / Route 49 in Pennsville Township; N.J. Turnpike / Route 140 / CR 540 in Carneys Point Township; Route 45 in Woodstown; Route 55 in Franklin Township; Route 54 in Buena; Route 50 in Hamilton Township; US 322 in Hamilton Township; G.S. Parkway in Egg Harbor Township; US 9 in Pleasantville; A.C. Expressway in Atlantic City
- East end: Atlantic Avenue / Pacific Avenue in Atlantic City

Location
- Country: United States
- State: New Jersey
- Counties: Salem, Gloucester, Atlantic

Highway system
- United States Numbered Highway System; List; Special; Divided; New Jersey State Highway Routes; Interstate; US; State; Scenic Byways
← Route 39	→ Route 40

U.S. Route 40 (US 40) is a U.S. highway running from Silver Summit, Utah east to Atlantic City, New Jersey. The easternmost segment of the route runs 64.32 miles (103.51 km) through the southern part of New Jersey between the Delaware Memorial Bridge over the Delaware River in Pennsville Township, Salem County, where it continues into Delaware along with Interstate 295 (I-295), east to Atlantic Avenue and Pacific Avenue in Atlantic City, Atlantic County. The route passes through Salem, Gloucester, and Atlantic counties as well as the boroughs of Woodstown, Elmer, Newfield, and Buena. The route encounters a mix of rural, suburban, and urban environs throughout its journey across South Jersey.

In 1923, pre-1927 Route 18S was to run from Penns Grove to Atlantic City along much of present-day US 40 in New Jersey. US 40 was signed along Route 18S in 1926, running from a ferry in Penns Grove that crossed the Delaware River to Wilmington, Delaware. In 1927, Route 18S was renumbered to Route 48. The portion of US 40 in Atlantic City was legislated as Route 55 in 1938, around the same time the route was moved to a ferry across the Delaware River between Pennsville and New Castle, Delaware. After the Delaware Memorial Bridge and the New Jersey Turnpike were both completed in 1951, US 40 was moved to its current alignment in the area. In 1953, the Route 48 and Route 55 designations along US 40 were removed. A toll freeway was once planned along the US 40 corridor in the 1980s to alleviate traffic, but it was never built after it was deemed the traffic volume was not high enough for it to be constructed.

== Route description ==
=== Salem County ===
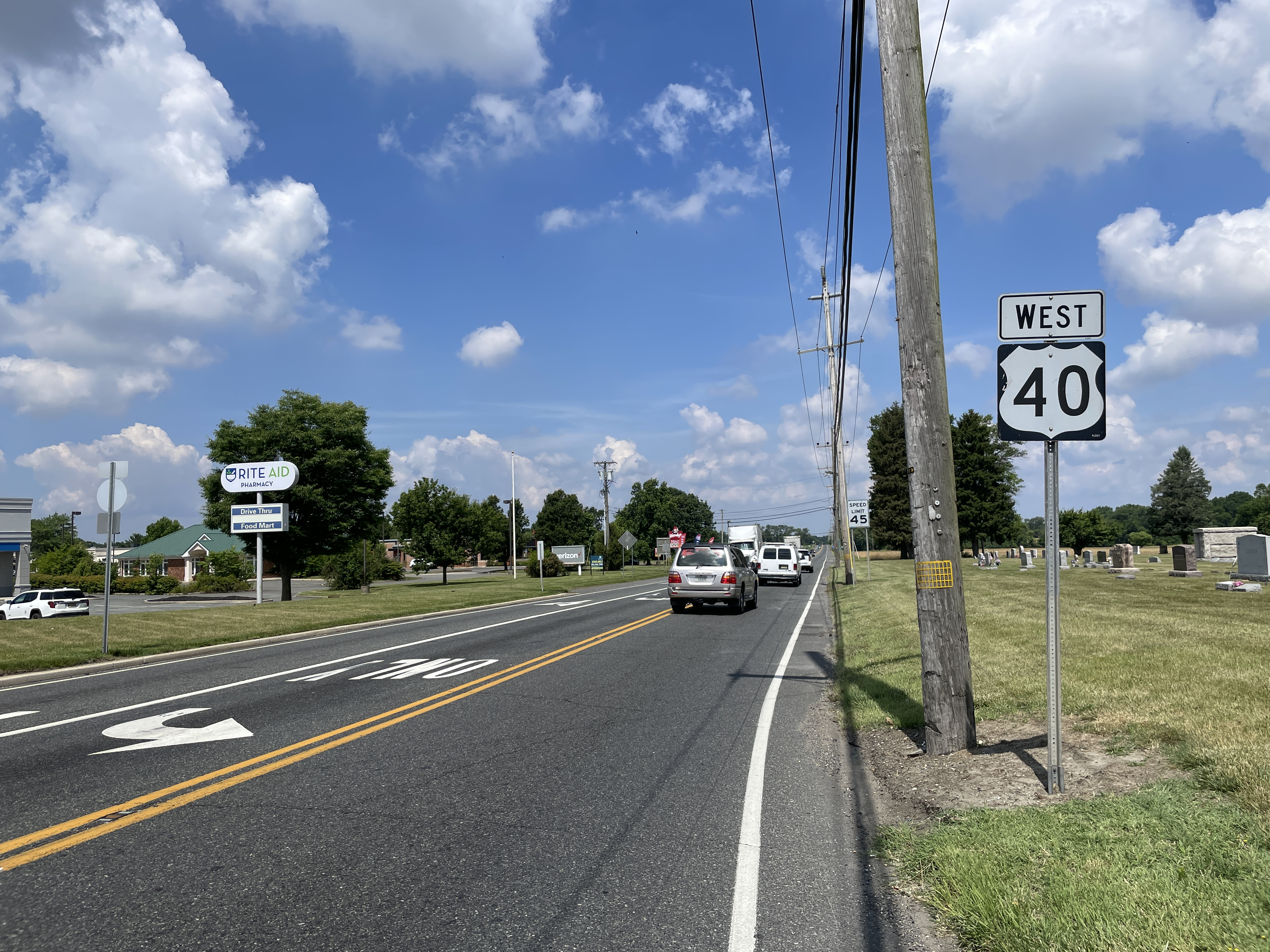
US 40 westbound past Route 45 in Pilesgrove Township

US 40 enters New Jersey along with I-295 from Delaware on the Delaware Memorial Bridge over the Delaware River. The road heads southeast into Salem County as an eight-lane freeway maintained by the Delaware River and Bay Authority that passes through industrial areas. I-295/US 40 begins a brief concurrency with the New Jersey Turnpike before it interchanges with the southern terminus of US 130 and the western terminus of Route 49. Immediately after, I-295 splits from US 40 and the turnpike by turning northeast on a freeway that soon overlaps CR 551 briefly while US 40 follows the four-lane New Jersey Turnpike and continues east on it for a short distance, entering Carneys Point Township. US 40 splits from the New Jersey Turnpike at the last exit before the toll barrier, the same point where Route 140 heads west and CR 540 heads to the east. From this point, US 40 becomes an at-grade, four-lane divided highway maintained by the New Jersey Department of Transportation called Wiley Road that runs a short distance south of the New Jersey Turnpike, containing a wide median. It continues into rural areas consisting of woods, farms, and residences, heading farther to the south of the New Jersey Turnpike.

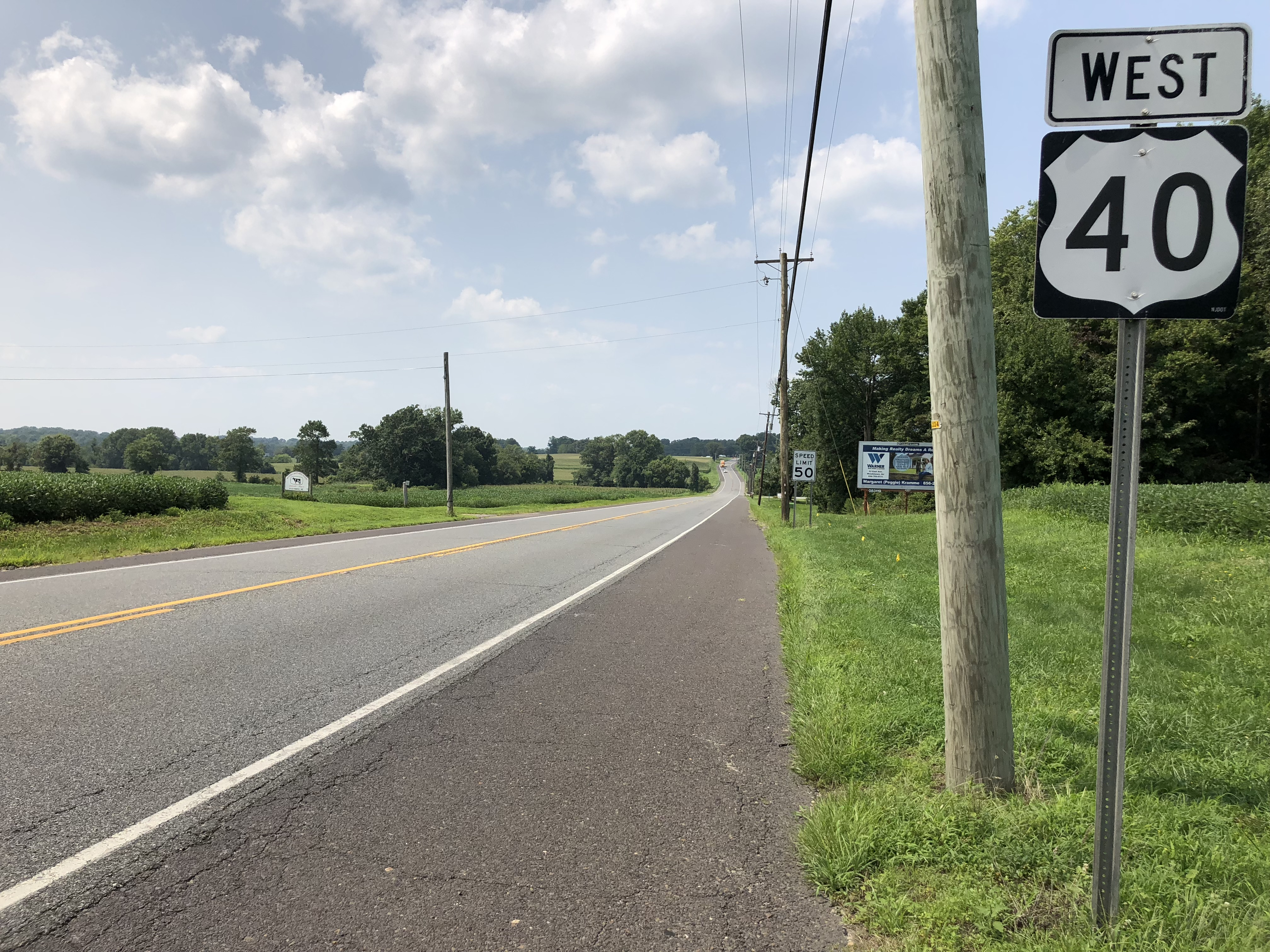
View west along US 40 at Glassboro Road in Pilesgrove Township

Upon meeting the eastern terminus of Route 48, US 40 turns to the southeast and becomes the Harding Highway, a two-lane undivided road that passes through more agricultural areas. Upon crossing CR 646, the road enters Pilesgrove Township and continues past the Cowtown Farmers Market and Cowtown Rodeo. The route passes through the residential community of Sharptown before coming to an intersection with Route 45. At this point, US 40 turns to the northeast to run concurrent on Route 45 and enters Woodstown, where it becomes West Avenue and passes residences before reaching the downtown area. Here, Route 45 splits from US 40 by heading north on Main Street and US 40 continues to the east as East Avenue. The route passes through more developed areas, crossing the SMS Rail Lines' Salem Branch line and heading north of Woodstown High School. The route crosses from Woodstown into Pilesgrove Township again, where it turns east-southeast as Harding Highway and heads back into a mix of fields and woods amid homes. About 0.17 mi (0.27 km) after entering Upper Pittsgrove Township, the road crosses CR 581. In the community of Pole Tavern further to the east, US 40 encounters Route 77, CR 604, and CR 635 at the Pole Tavern Circle. Past Pole Tavern, the road passes more farm fields before coming to Elmer, where it becomes Chestnut Street. In Elmer, the route passes homes and makes a turn to the northeast onto Front Street. Upon leaving Elmer, US 40 becomes Harding Highway again and forms the border of Upper Pittsgrove Township to the north and Pittsgrove Township to the south, passing through forested areas among development. The route crosses CR 553 before passing through the community of Porchtown.

=== Gloucester and Atlantic counties ===
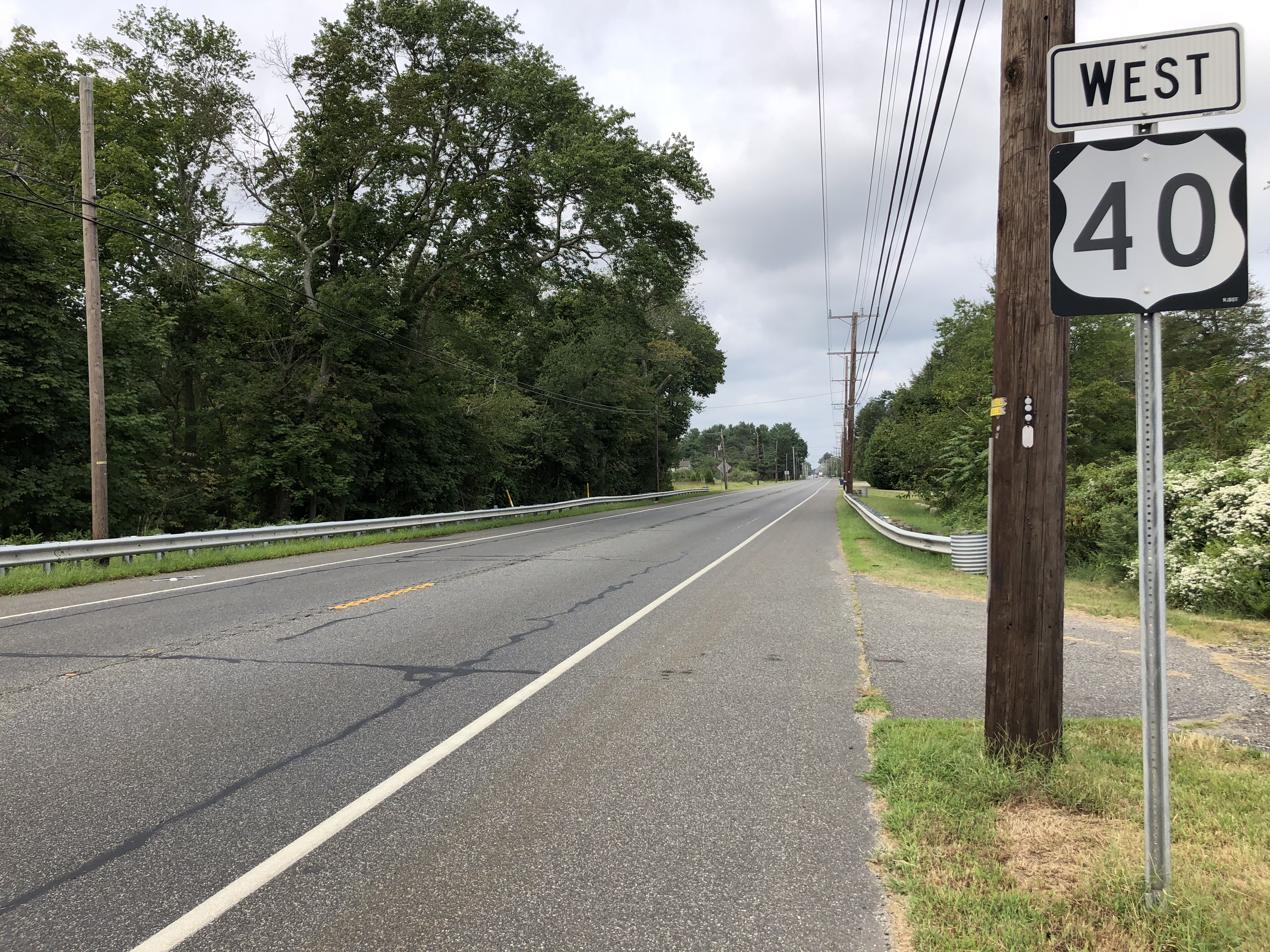
US 40 westbound past CR 661 in Franklin Township

After Porchtown, US 40 crosses into Franklin Township in Gloucester County, turning southeast and running through more woods. It comes to a cloverleaf interchange with Route 55, where US 40 is briefly a four-lane divided highway. Past Route 55, the route continues past Malaga Lake and comes to the community of Malaga. In Malaga, the route heads into a business district and intersects Route 47, turning to the northeast to run concurrent on a three-lane road with a center left-turn lane through inhabited areas. After passing over Conrail Shared Assets Operations' (CSAO) Vineland Secondary railroad line, US 40 and Route 47 split. Route 47 heads north and US 40 turns south and continues parallel to the railroad tracks. The road makes a turn to the east-southeast, leaving Malaga and returning to areas of farmland and trees. The road briefly runs along the northern border of Newfield before coming to a crossroads with CR 555. After passing near the Vineland-Downstown Airport, US 40 intersects CR 557 and forms a concurrency with that route.

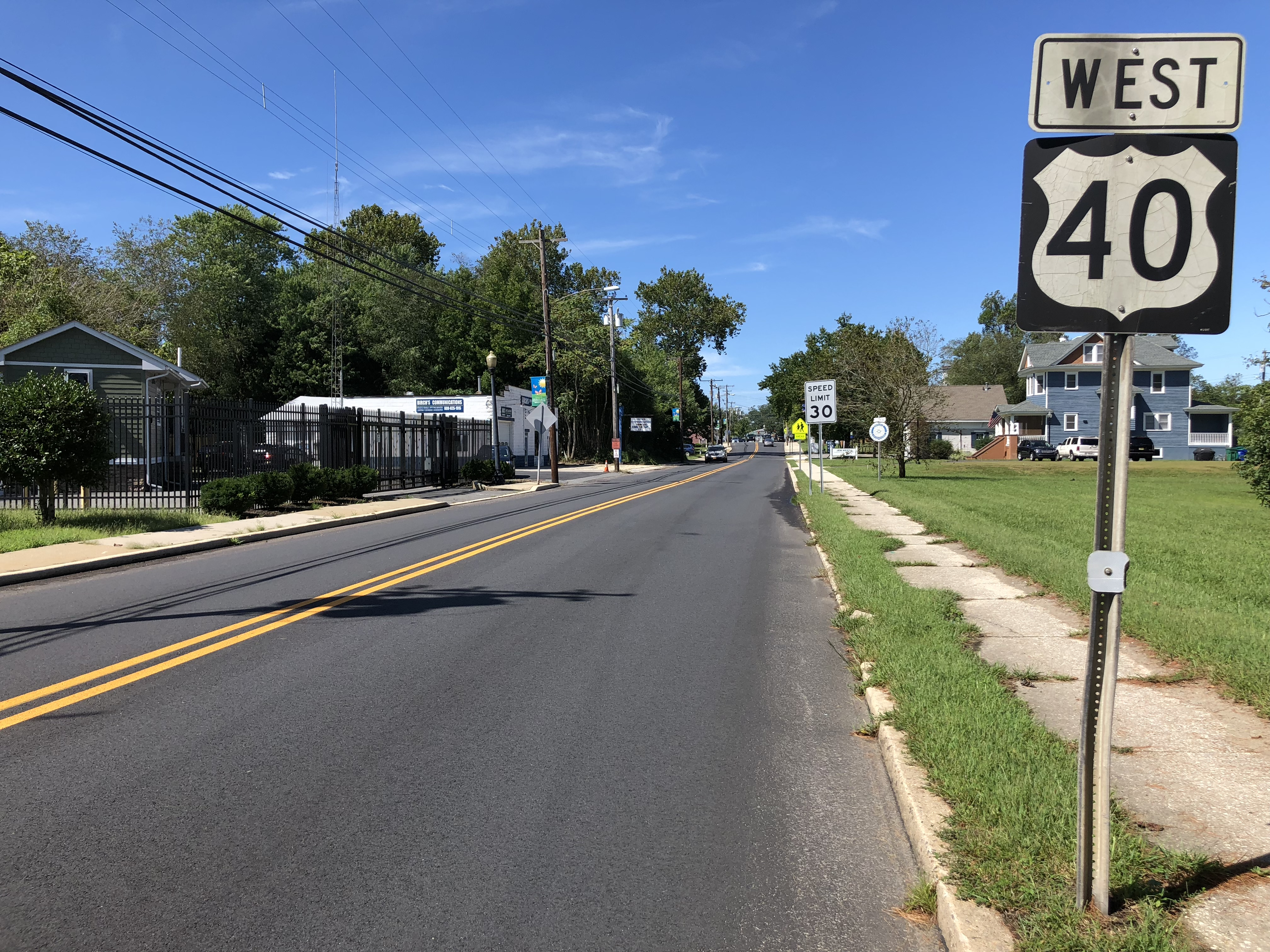
US 40 westbound concurrent with CR 559 in Mays Landing

Immediately after CR 557 joins US 40, the road enters Buena, Atlantic County and continues southeast into inhabited areas. After running through the commercial center of town, where it crosses the Southern Railroad of New Jersey's Southern Running Track line, the road comes to the southern terminus of Route 54 and the eastern end of CR 619 in a business area located on the outskirts. At this point, it enters Buena Vista Township, and CR 557 splits form US 40 by heading to the southeast on Buena-Tuckahoe Road. From this point, US 40 becomes concurrent with CR 557 Truck and enters dense woodland containing homes and businesses as well as occasional farms. The road reaches the residential community of Richland, where it encounters the eastern terminus of CR 540 and CR 622 and crosses the Beesleys Point Secondary railroad line operated by the Cape May Seashore Lines railroad. Upon leaving Richland, the route crosses into Hamilton Township, where it runs through Mizpah before heading back into forested areas and a few residential sectors. US 40 intersects the eastern terminus of CR 552, briefly becoming a divided highway before turning east into denser inhabited areas. The highway intersects CR 559 Truck/CR 606, at which point it becomes concurrent with CR 559 Truck. The route meets Route 50, where CR 557 Truck splits to the south. Route 50 joins US 40 before the road crosses the Great Egg Harbor River. Upon crossing the river, the road enters Mays Landing and turns north into the downtown area. CR 559 Truck splits southbound to follow CR 617 to the east. A short distance later, the road meets CR 559 and US 40 splits from Route 50 by turning east onto that route. This intersection marks the beginning of CR 559 Truck northbound. The road passes more development before CR 559 splits from the road by heading southeast. US 40 heads east out of Mays Landing, where it continues through woodland and increasing residential development. The road widens into four lanes as it comes to US 322 (Black Horse Pike) near the Hamilton Mall. At this point, US 40 forms a concurrency with US 322, which lasts for the remainder of the route.

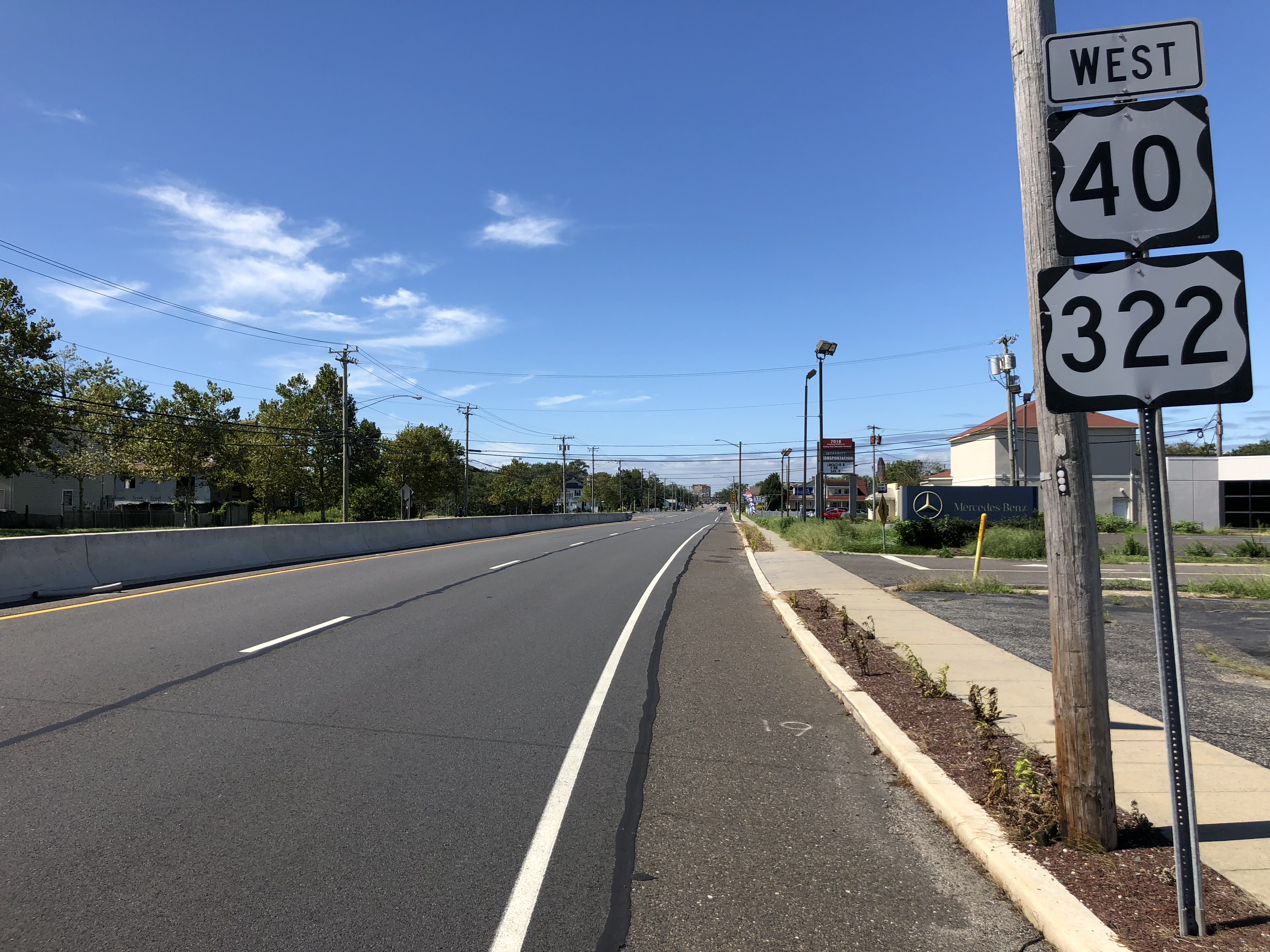
US 40/US 322 westbound in Egg Harbor Township

The two routes continue to the southeast through business areas, meeting CR 575 and a ramp to the Atlantic City Expressway. CR 575 turns east to follow US 40/US 322. The road enters Egg Harbor Township, and CR 575 splits from US 40/US 322 by turning to the south. The route passes more wooded residential and commercial areas, as well as the Storybook Land amusement park, before intersecting CR 563. US 40/US 322 forms a concurrency with that route and passes through a business district that includes the Harbor Square shopping center. CR 563 splits from the road by continuing southeast and the Black Horse Pike heads east interchange with the Garden State Parkway. The only direct ramp present is between the Black Horse Pike westbound and the Garden State Parkway northbound; all other movements are provided by CR 563. Past here, US 40/US 322 continues east past more businesses, crossing CR 651 before entering Pleasantville. In Pleasantville, the road crosses US 9. Past this intersection, the roadway passes under the Somers Point Bike Path. Upon crossing CR 585, the Black Horse Pike continues past residences as an undivided road, crossing back into Egg Harbor Township. The road passes more businesses, closely paralleling the Atlantic City Expressway before entering Atlantic City. Here, the name becomes Albany Avenue and it comes to a pair of ramps that provide access to and from the Black Horse Pike eastbound and the Atlantic City Expressway westbound. US 40/US 322 enters marshland, crossing the Great Thorofare onto Great Island, where it has an interchange providing access to Atlantic City High School that also has U-turn ramps, before passing over the Beach Thorofare. Past this bridge, the road passes between businesses to the west and the closed Bader Field airport and Surf Stadium to the east. US 40/US 322 crosses the Inside Thorofare on a drawbridge and continues as a county maintained road to its end at Atlantic Avenue and Pacific Avenue, one block from the boardwalk. Through New Jersey, US 40 serves as a main road connecting Atlantic City with points south along Interstate 95, such as Baltimore and Washington, D.C.

== History ==
Route 55 (1938-1953)

The portion of US 40 that overlaps US 322 follows the Black Horse Pike, a turnpike established in 1855 that was to run from Camden to Atlantic City via Blackwoodtown. In 1902, the Atlantic County Board of Freeholders authorized the construction of a toll-free highway from Pleasantville to Albany Avenue in Atlantic City, which was completed in 1905. The entire route of modern US 40 was signed as the Powder Way, running from the ferry at Penn's Grove to Atlantic City.

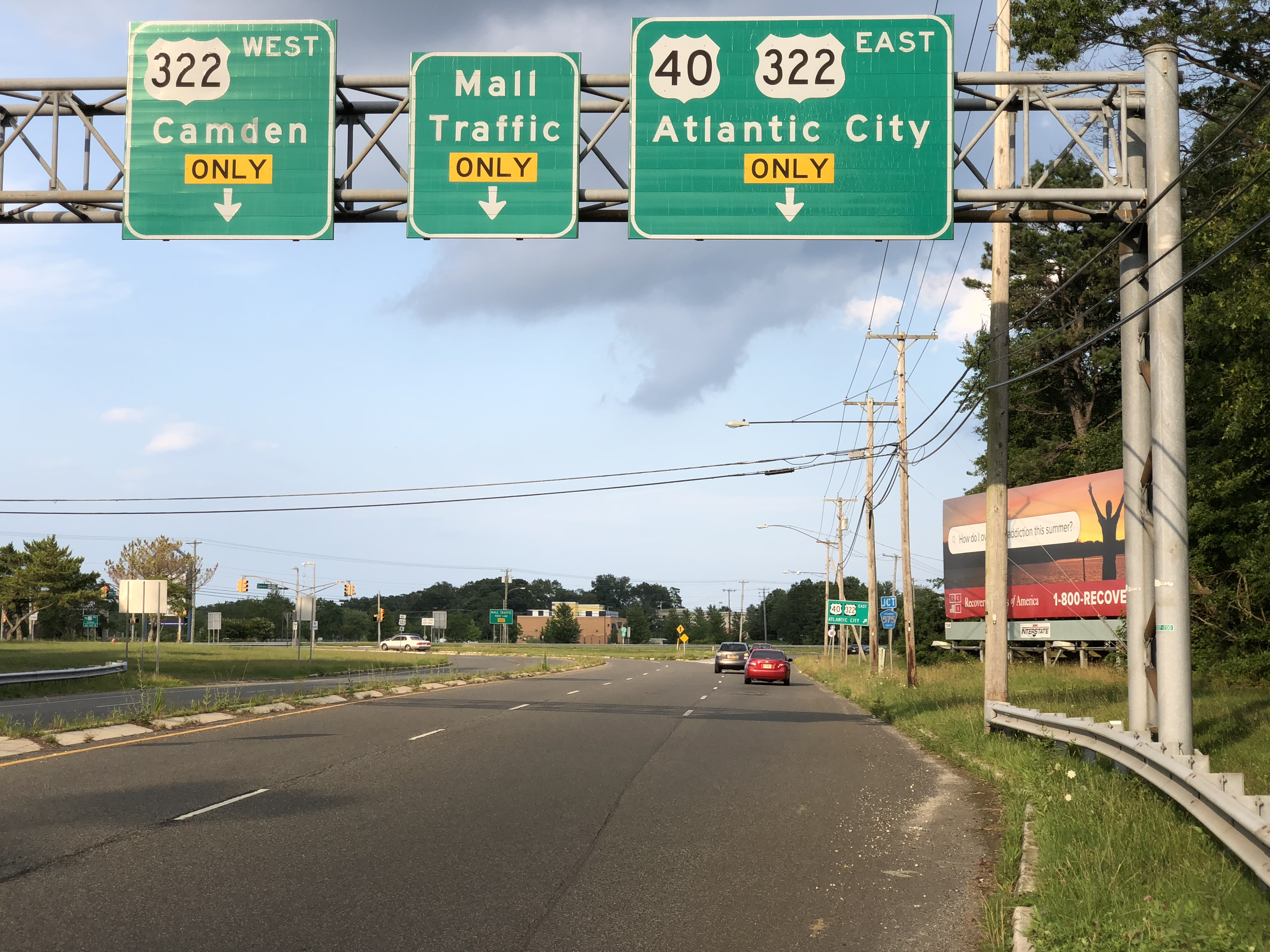
US 40 eastbound at US 322 in Hamilton Township

In 1923, pre-1927 Route 18S was created along the current alignment of US 40 east of the Route 48 intersection, running from Penns Grove to Atlantic City. When the U.S. Highway System was established in 1926, the alignment of US 40 in New Jersey ran from Penns Grove, where a ferry carried the route across the Delaware River to Wilmington, Delaware, east to Atlantic City along pre-1927 Route 18S. In the 1927 New Jersey state highway renumbering that occurred a year later, pre-1927 Route 18S was replaced by Route 48. In 1936, US 322 was also signed concurrent with US 40 on the Black Horse Pike. The portion of US 40/US 322 that existed in Atlantic City was legislated as Route 55 in 1938. Also by 1938, US 40 was moved to a ferry that ran across the Delaware River between Pennsville and New Castle, Delaware, following current Route 49, local roads, and CR 551 to travel between the ferry and Route 48. Following the completion of the Delaware Memorial Bridge and the New Jersey Turnpike in 1951, US 40 was moved to the new bridge and routed to follow a small portion of the New Jersey Turnpike and Wiley Road to the current eastern terminus of Route 48. In the 1953 New Jersey state highway renumbering, which eliminated concurrencies between U.S. highways and state routes, Route 48 was removed from the portion of US 40 east of its current eastern terminus and the Route 55 designation was dropped entirely.

In the 1980s, Congressman William J. Hughes proposed a freeway along the US 40 corridor in order to alleviate increased traffic along that route following the legalization of gambling in Atlantic City. This freeway, which was to be maintained by the New Jersey Expressway Authority, was to run from the Delaware Memorial Bridge east to Atlantic City. The NJDOT determined that the traffic volume on US 40 did not justify the construction of a freeway along the corridor. The Cardiff Circle along US 40/US 322 at CR 563 and CR 608 in Egg Harbor Township was eliminated in a $3.7 million project completed in 2002.

In 2013, the road was one of three that tied for the #1 ranking on the Tri-State Transportation Campaign's list of the top ten most dangerous roads for pedestrians in New Jersey, New York and Connecticut. The route, along with US 130 (Burlington Pike) in Burlington County and US 1 in Middlesex County, were so ranked due to the nine pedestrian deaths that occurred on each of those roads from 2009 to 2011.

Due to frequent flooding in Atlantic County, NJDOT announced in 2019 a plan to reconstruct and raise a one-mile portion of the roadway from Naples Avenue to Bayport Drive in Egg Harbor Township by 2.5 ft (0.76 m). The $27.5 million project is scheduled to begin in 2022 and completed in 2025.

== Major intersections ==
County	Location	mi	km	Exit	Destinations	Notes
Delaware River		0.00	0.00	—	I-295 south / US 40 west to I-95 – Delaware	Continuation into Delaware
Delaware River		0.00	0.00	Delaware Memorial Bridge (westbound toll in Delaware)		
Salem	Pennsville Township	0.51	0.82	N.J. Turnpike begins		
Salem	Pennsville Township	0.73– 0.95	1.17– 1.53	1A	Route 49 east – Pennsville, Salem	Signed as exit 1 westbound; western terminus of Route 49; last westbound exit before toll
Salem	Pennsville Township	0.73– 0.95	1.17– 1.53	—	I-295 north / US 130 north – Camden, Trenton, Penns Grove	Eastern end of I-295 concurrency; eastbound exit and westbound entrance
Salem	Carneys Point Township	1.70– 1.85	2.74– 2.98	—	N.J. Turnpike north / Route 140 west / CR 540 (Hawks Bridge Road) – New York City	Eastern end of NJTP concurrency; eastern terminus of Route 140
Salem	Carneys Point Township	1.70– 1.85	2.74– 2.98	Eastern end of freeway section		
Salem	Carneys Point Township	5.43	8.74		Route 48 west – Penns Grove	Eastern terminus of Route 48
Salem	Pilesgrove Township	10.02	16.13		Route 45 south (Salem-Woodstown Road) – Salem	Western end of Route 45 concurrency
Salem	Woodstown	10.67	17.17		Route 45 north (North Main Street) – Mullica Hill	Eastern end of Route 45 concurrency
Salem	Upper Pittsgrove Township	14.57	23.45		CR 581 (Commissioners Pike) – Mullica Hill, Alloway	
Salem	Upper Pittsgrove Township	16.52	26.59		Route 77	Pole Tavern Circle
Salem	Upper Pittsgrove Township	21.82	35.12		CR 553 (Buck Road) – Glassboro, Centerton, Parvin State Park	
Gloucester	Franklin Township	25.54	41.10		Route 55 – Glassboro, Bellmawr, Vineland, Millville, Cape May	Exit 39 on Route 55
Gloucester	Franklin Township	26.71	42.99		Route 47 south (Delsea Drive) – Vineland	Western end of Route 47 concurrency
Gloucester	Franklin Township	27.21	43.79		Route 47 north (Delsea Drive) – Camden	Eastern end of Route 47 concurrency
Gloucester	Franklin Township	30.25	48.68		CR 555 (Main Road) – Williamstown, Vineland	
Gloucester	Franklin Township	32.71	52.64		CR 557 north (Tuckahoe Road) – Cross Keys	Western end of CR 557 concurrency
Atlantic	Buena–Buena Vista Township line	35.17	56.60		Route 54 north (Blue Anchor Road) to A.C. Expressway – Hammonton	Southern terminus of Route 54
Atlantic	Buena Vista Township	35.30	56.81		CR 557 south (Buena-Tuckahoe Road) – Milmay, Tuckahoe, Cape May	Eastern end of CR 557 concurrency; western end of CR 557 Truck concurrency
Atlantic	Buena Vista Township	38.23	61.53		CR 540 west (Cedar Avenue) – Vineland, Salem	Eastern terminus of CR 540
Atlantic	Hamilton Township	45.21	72.76		CR 552 west (Millville Road) – Milmay, Vineland, Millville	Eastern terminus of CR 552
Atlantic	Hamilton Township	45.62	73.42		CR 559 Truck north / CR 606 east (Old Harding Highway)	Western end of CR 559 Truck concurrency
Atlantic	Hamilton Township	46.39	74.66		Route 50 south / CR 557 Truck south (Mill Street) – Wildwood, Cape May	Eastern end of CR 557 Truck concurrency; western end of Route 50 concurrency
Atlantic	Hamilton Township	46.82	75.35		CR 559 Truck south / CR 617 east (Somers Point-Mays Landing Road)	Eastern end of CR 559 Truck concurrency southbound
Atlantic	Hamilton Township	47.01	75.66		Route 50 north (Cape May Avenue) / CR 559 north (Main Street) to A.C. Expressway west	Eastern end of Route 50/CR 559 Truck concurrency northbound; western end of CR 559 concurrency
Atlantic	Hamilton Township	47.34	76.19		CR 559 south (Somers Point Road) – Ocean City, Somers Point	Eastern end of CR 559 concurrency
Atlantic	Hamilton Township	51.77	83.32		US 322 west (Black Horse Pike) – Camden	Western end of US 322 concurrency
Atlantic	Hamilton Township	51.97	83.64		CR 575 north (Wrangleboro Road) to A.C. Expressway – Pomona	Western end of CR 575 concurrency
Atlantic	Egg Harbor Township	53.89	86.73		CR 575 south (English Creek Avenue) – English Creek	Eastern end of CR 575 concurrency
Atlantic	Egg Harbor Township	56.98	91.70		CR 563 north (Tilton Road)	Western end of CR 563 concurrency
Atlantic	Egg Harbor Township	57.38	92.34		CR 563 south (Tilton Road) – Margate City, Ocean City	Eastern end of CR 563 concurrency
Atlantic	Egg Harbor Township	57.46	92.47		G.S. Parkway north to A.C. Expressway	Exit 36 on G.S. Parkway
Atlantic	Pleasantville	59.13	95.16		US 9 – Absecon, Somers Point	
Atlantic	Pleasantville	59.50	95.76		CR 585 (Main Street)	
Atlantic	Atlantic City	61.99– 62.17	99.76– 100.05		A.C. Expressway west – Philadelphia	Westbound exit and eastbound entrance; exit 2 on A.C. Expressway
Atlantic	Atlantic City	62.69	100.89		Atlantic City High School To A.C. Expressway west	Interchange with U-turn ramps; ACE signed on eastbound U-turn ramp
Atlantic	Atlantic City	64.32	103.51		Atlantic Avenue / Pacific Avenue – Midtown, Uptown, Marina US 322 ends	Eastern terminus; eastern terminus of US 322
1.000 mi = 1.609 km; 1.000 km = 0.621 mi: Concurrency terminus; Incomplete access; Tolled

== See also ==
U.S. Route 40
Previous state: Delaware	New Jersey	Next state: Terminus
