= Harding Highway =

Harding Highway may refer to:

- New Jersey Route 48
- U.S. Route 40 in New Jersey
- Harding Highway (Ohio), eventually extending west to Denver
