= Black Horse Pike =

Roadways in New Jersey

Route information
- Maintained by NJDOT
- Length: 52.04 mi (83.75 km)
- Component highways: Route 168 from Camden to Washington Township; Route 42 from Washington Township to Monroe Township; US 322 from Monroe Township to Atlantic City; US 40 from Hamilton Township to Atlantic City

Major junctions
- North end: US 130 / Route 168 in Camden
- I-295 in Bellmawr; N.J. Turnpike in Bellmawr; Route 42 in Gloucester Township; Route 42 / A.C. Expressway in Washington Township; US 322 in Monroe Township; Route 54 in Folsom; Route 50 in Hamilton Township; US 40 in Hamilton Township; G.S. Parkway in Egg Harbor Township; US 9 in Pleasantville
- East end: US 40 / US 322 (Albany Avenue) in Atlantic City

Location
- Country: United States
- State: New Jersey

Highway system
- New Jersey State Highway Routes; Interstate; US; State; Scenic Byways

The Black Horse Pike is a designation used for a number of different roadways that had been part of a historic route connecting the Camden area to the area of Atlantic City, New Jersey. Roadways now bearing the Black Horse Pike designation include portions of Route 168, Route 42, U.S. Route 322 (US 322), and US 40.

== Route description ==
=== Route 168 ===
The Black Horse Pike heads south from US 130 in Camden as a four-lane, divided highway comprising Route 168, which continues north of US 130 on Mt. Ephraim Avenue. It heads south and interchanges Route 76C, which heads west and provides access to Interstate 76 (I-76) and the Walt Whitman Bridge. It passes through Haddon Township with many jughandles at intersections. It then passes through Mt. Ephraim, where the road was restriped in the late 1990s reducing it from four lanes to two, and enters Bellmawr, where it interchanges with exit 28 of I-295 and exit 3 of the New Jersey Turnpike (NJTP). It then enters Runnemede, where it crosses Route 41 and County Route 544 (CR 544). It then heads into Gloucester Township and interchanges with Route 42. It continues south, passing through Blackwood, where it intersects CR 534, and then widens back into a four-lane, divided highway. It then heads toward the southern terminus of the North–South Freeway (Route 42) and the western terminus of the Atlantic City Expressway, where Route 168 ends and the Black Horse Pike becomes Route 42.

=== Route 42 ===
The Black Horse Pike heads south into Washington Township, Gloucester County on Route 42 as a four-lane divided highway lined with many businesses. In Cross Keys, it intersects CR 555. It then enters Monroe Township, where in Williamstown, it meets US 322 and CR 536 Spur. Here, Route 42 ends and US 322 heads east onto the Black Horse Pike.

=== US 322 ===
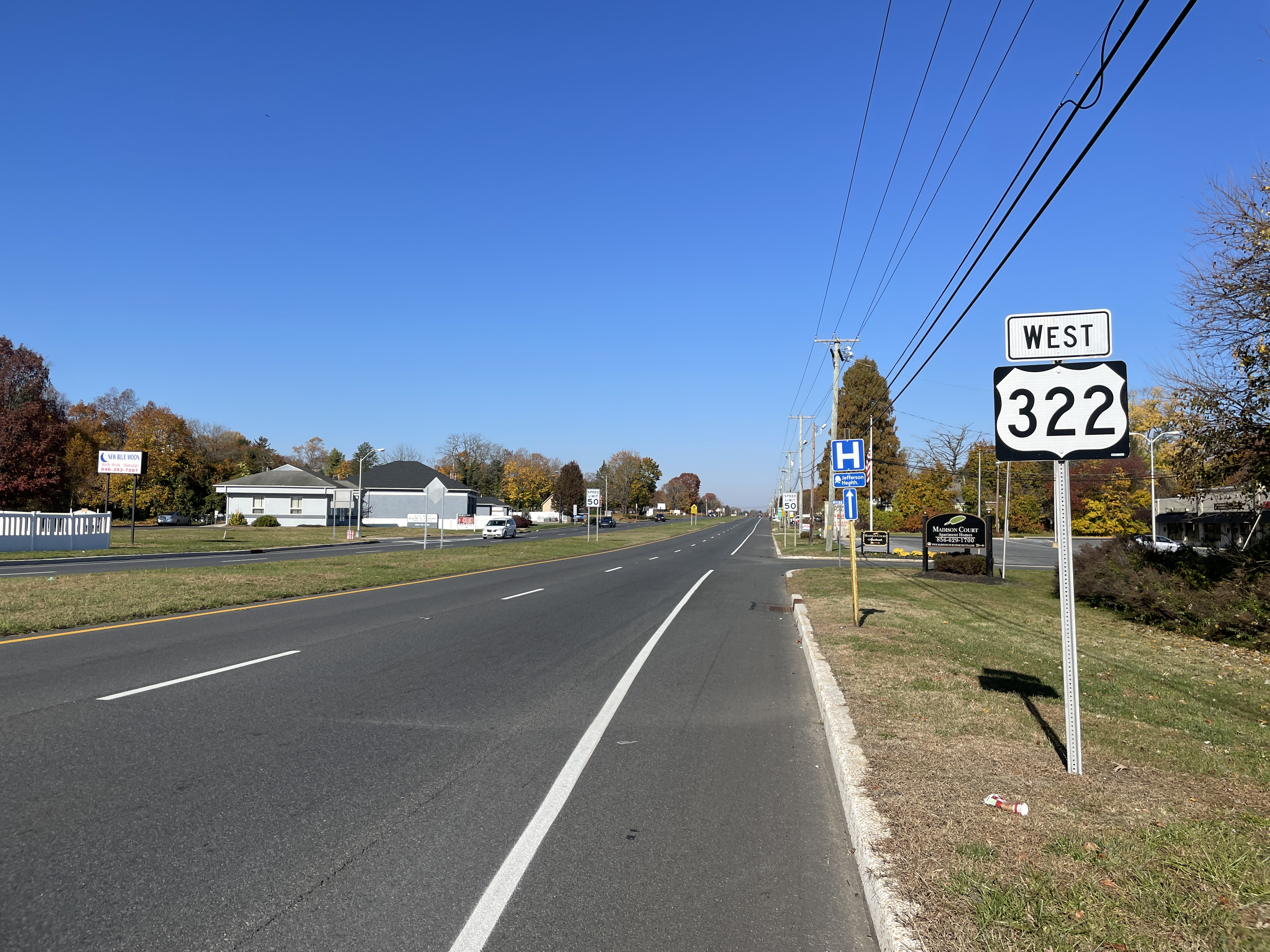
US 322 westbound on the Black Horse Pike in Williamstown

US 322 heads southeast on the Black Horse Pike from Williamstown, intersecting CR 536 and CR 538. It heads into Folsom, Atlantic County, where it meets Route 54 at a cloverleaf interchange and then the southern terminus of Route 73. It continues into Hamilton Township, passing through rural areas. It intersects CR 559 shortly after crossing into Hamilton Township. Near Mays Landing, it features an interchange with Route 50. It continues southeast and near the Hamilton Mall and the former Atlantic City Race Course, it intersects US 40.

=== US 40/US 322 concurrency ===
US 40 joins US 322 and the two routes continue to the southeast along the Black Horse Pike. Shortly after joining, the road intersects CR 575, which then forms a concurrency on the Black Horse Pike along with US 40 and US 322. It heads into Egg Harbor Township, and Route 575 splits from the Black Horse Pike by heading south on English Creek Avenue. The Black Horse Pike has an intersection with CR 563, which was formerly a traffic circle built in 1932 until it was replaced by traffic signals and jughandles in 2002. The Black Horse Pike has a brief concurrency with CR 563 and then meets the Garden State Parkway (GSP) with access provided by way of CR 563 and CR 608. The route continues east into Pleasantville, where it crosses US 9. It then passes through the center of Pleasantville on Verona Avenue, with the name changing back to Black Horse Pike. At the border with Atlantic City, the road becomes Albany Avenue, which carries US 40 and US 322 into Atlantic City.

== History ==
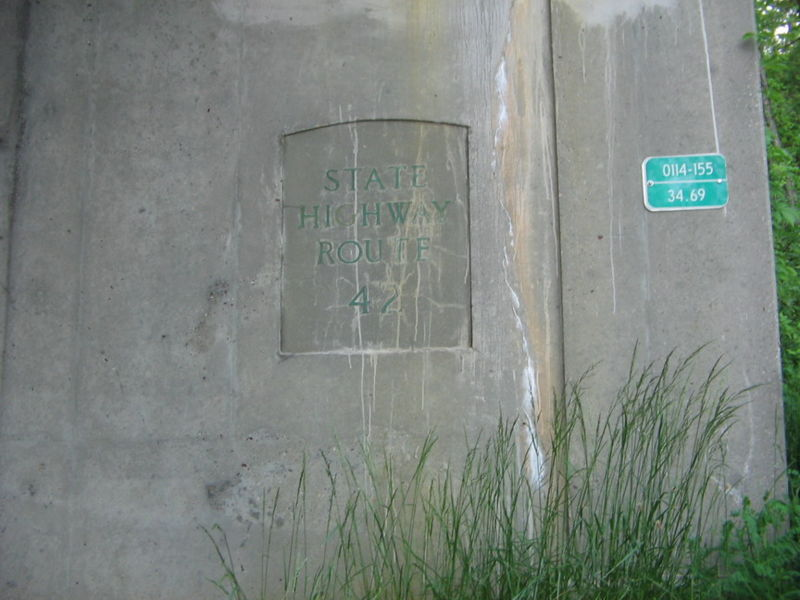
The Route 54 bridge over the Black Horse Pike (US 322) in Folsom, showing the former Route 42 designation.

The origins of the Black Horse Pike can be traced to 1795 when surveyors working for old Gloucester County, laid out a new and straight road to replace the meandering Irish Road. The new roadway carried various names including the Newton Road, Chews Landing-Philadelphia Road, Mount Ephraim-Blackwoodtown Road, etc. State legislators incorporated the Williamstown and Good Intent Turnpike Company in 1852, and Camden and Blackwoodtown Turnpike Company in 1855, converting the road into a toll road north of Good Intent.

In 1923, the portion from Mays Landing to Atlantic City became part of Route 18S. With the 1927 New Jersey state highway renumbering, the route became Route 42 from Camden to Mays Landing and Route 48 from Mays Landing to Atlantic City. US 322 was later designated along the road from Williamstown to Atlantic City and US 40 from Mays Landing to Atlantic City. With the 1953 New Jersey state highway renumbering, which eliminated long concurrencies between U.S. and state routes in New Jersey, the Route 42 and Route 48 designations were removed from the parts of the road that were already signed as US 322 or US 40/US 322, with Route 42 cut back to Williamstown and Route 48 completely removed from the Black Horse Pike. Following the completion of the North–South Freeway, Route 42 was moved off the Black Horse Pike to the new freeway between Camden and Turnersville, and the Route 168 designation was given to the Black Horse Pike between Camden and Turnersville.

== Major intersections ==
The mileposts correspond to the routes the Black Horse Pike follows.

County	Location	mi	km	Destinations	Notes
Camden	Camden	9.72	15.64	US 130 / Route 168 north (Mount Ephraim Avenue) – Collingswood	No left turns; Route 168 continues north as Mount Ephraim Avenue
Camden	Haddon Township	9.48	15.26	To I-76 west / I-676 north – Walt Whitman Bridge, Philadelphia	Interchange with unsigned Route 76C, northbound exit and southbound entrance
Camden	Mount Ephraim	8.07	12.99	CR 551 Spur (Kings Highway) – Westville, Haddonfield	
Camden	Bellmawr	7.42	11.94	I-295 – Trenton, Walt Whitman Bridge, Delaware Memorial Bridge	Exit 28 on I-295
Camden	Bellmawr	6.60	10.62	N.J. Turnpike – New York, Delaware	Exit 3 on NJ Turnpike
Camden	Runnemede	5.71	9.19	Route 41 / CR 573 north (Clements Bridge Road) – Deptford Township, Barrington	Southern terminus of CR 573
Camden	Runnemede	5.39	8.67	CR 544 (Evesham Road) – Deptford Township, Magnolia	
Camden	Gloucester Township	3.42– 3.44	5.50– 5.54	Route 42 to A.C. Expressway – Walt Whitman Bridge, Philadelphia, Williamstown, Atlantic City	No northbound access to Route 42 south; exits 9B-10A on Route 42
Camden	Gloucester Township	2.43	3.91	CR 534 (Church Street)	
Gloucester	Washington Township	0.00– 0.25	0.00– 0.40	Route 42 north / A.C. Expressway east – Atlantic City, Shore Points	Southern terminus of Route 168; Route 42 joins Black Horse Pike; exit 7 on Route 42; exit 44 on A.C. Expressway
Gloucester	Washington Township	3.51	5.65	CR 555 south (Tuckahoe Road) – Vineland	
Gloucester	Monroe Township	0.00	0.00	US 322 west / CR 536 Spur (Sicklerville Road) – Glassboro, Sicklerville	East end of Route 42 overlap, west end of US 322 overlap
Gloucester	Monroe Township	24.67	39.70	CR 536 (Poplar Street / New Brooklyn Road) – Waterford, Glassboro	
Gloucester	Monroe Township	30.13	48.49	CR 538 west (Coles Mill Road)	
Atlantic	Folsom	34.66	55.78	Route 54 – Hammonton, Trenton, Buena, Millville	Interchange
Atlantic	Folsom	36.90	59.38	Route 73 / CR 561 Spur north (Mays Landing Road) to A.C. Expressway – Philadelphia	
Atlantic	Hamilton Township	41.37	66.58	CR 559 (Weymouth Road) – Mays Landing, Hammonton	Modified traffic circle
Atlantic	Hamilton Township	46.03	74.08	Route 50 – Mays Landing, Egg Harbor City	Interchange
Atlantic	Hamilton Township	50.26	80.89	US 40 west (Harding Highway) – Mays Landing	West end of US 40 overlap
Atlantic	Hamilton Township	50.46	81.21	CR 575 north (Wrangleboro Road) to A.C. Expressway – Pomona	West end of CR 575 overlap
Atlantic	Egg Harbor Township	52.38	84.30	CR 575 south (English Creek Avenue) – English Creek	East end of CR 575 overlap
Atlantic	Egg Harbor Township	55.47	89.27	CR 563 north (Tilton Road)	West end of CR 563 overlap
Atlantic	Egg Harbor Township	55.87	89.91	CR 563 south (Tilton Road) – Margate City, Ocean City	East end of CR 563 overlap
Atlantic	Egg Harbor Township	55.95	90.04	G.S. Parkway north to A.C. Expressway	GSP exit 36
Atlantic	Pleasantville	57.62	92.73	US 9 – Absecon, Somers Point	
Atlantic	Pleasantville	57.99	93.33	CR 585 (Main Street)	
Atlantic	Atlantic City	60.17	96.83	US 40 east / US 322 east (Albany Avenue)	Eastern terminus of Black Horse Pike, east end of US 40/US 322 overlap
1.000 mi = 1.609 km; 1.000 km = 0.621 mi: Concurrency terminus; Incomplete access; Tolled; Route transition

== See also ==
- White Horse Pike
