= Storybook Land =

Amusement park in Egg Harbor Township, New Jersey, United States

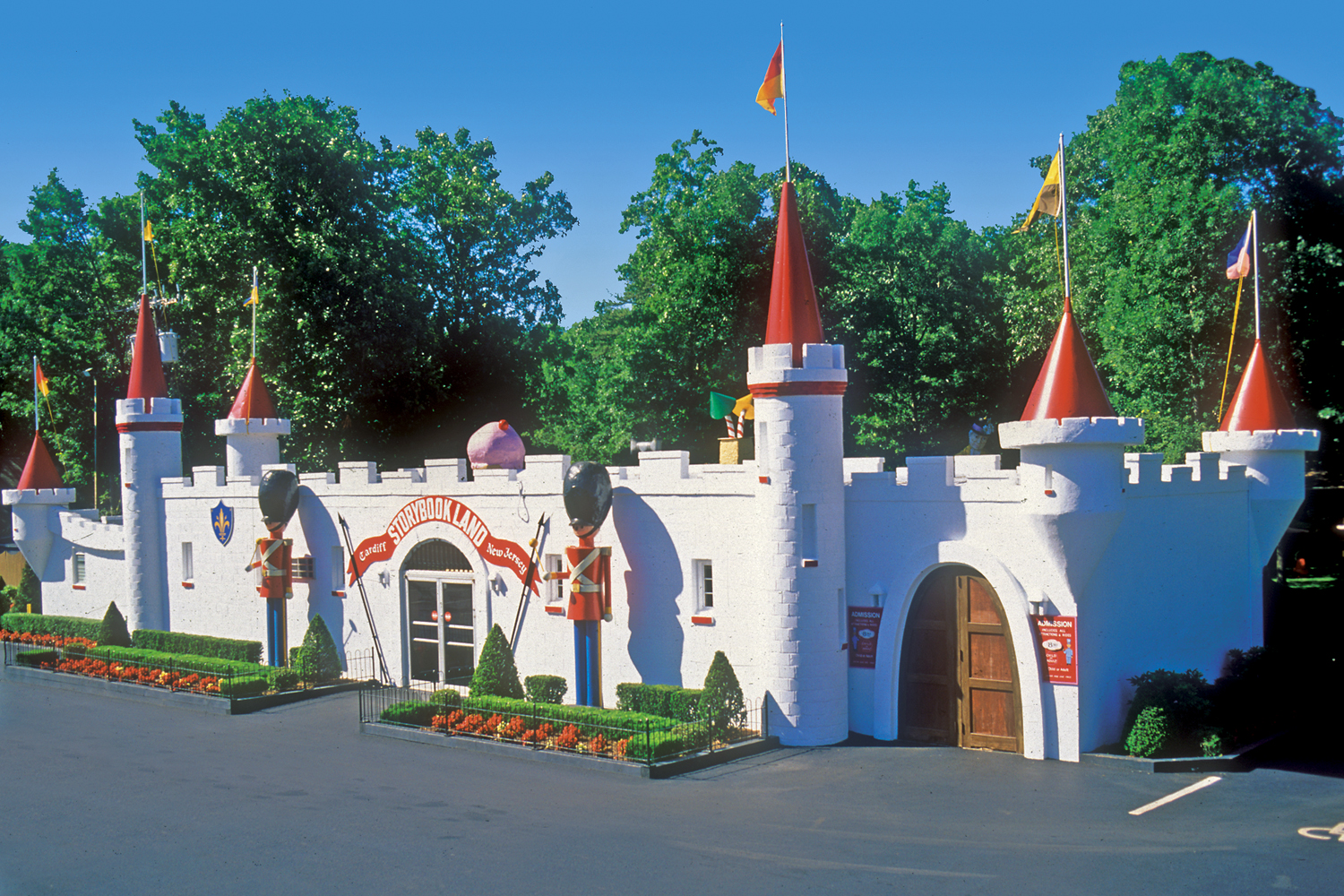
- Storybook Land Castle Entrance
- Interactive map of Storybook Land
- Location: Egg Harbor Township, New Jersey, U.S.
- Coordinates: 39.42356°N 74.59183°W
- Opened: 1955
- Owner: Fricano family
- Slogan: An Amazing Day for Your Children
- Area: 12 acres (4.9 ha)

Attractions
- Total: 17
- Roller coasters: 1

Storybook Land is a 20-acre (8.1 ha) family amusement park located in Egg Harbor Township, in the U.S. state of New Jersey. Opened in 1955 by John and Esther Fricano, Storybook Land is located on U.S. Route 322 (Black Horse Pike), about 2 miles (3.2 km) west of exit 37 on the Garden State Parkway. The park is themed after many storybook characters such as Mother Goose, the Three Little Pigs, and Snow White.

Some of its attractions are the J&J Railroad Train (which loops around most of the park), the Happy Dragon, Whirly-Bug and the Ferris wheel. It has many of the standard amusement park rides such as Bubbles the Coaster, a junior sized roller coaster, and the Turtle Twirl, a Tilt-A-Whirl. Storybook Land also has a Santa Claus house where Santa and Mrs. Claus will pose with the children during the Christmas season.

== Visiting the park ==
Storybook Land has several counter-service restaurants and a large, covered picnic area for bringing a meal from home. During the months of April and May, the park is heavily visited by school groups.

During the Christmas season, the park is heavily decorated in Christmas decorations and transforms into a winter wonderland. Santa and Mrs. Claus greet children in the park. Statues of the original mascots of the Philadelphia Phillies are present here.
