= Penns Grove, New Jersey =

Borough in Salem County, New Jersey, US

- Borough
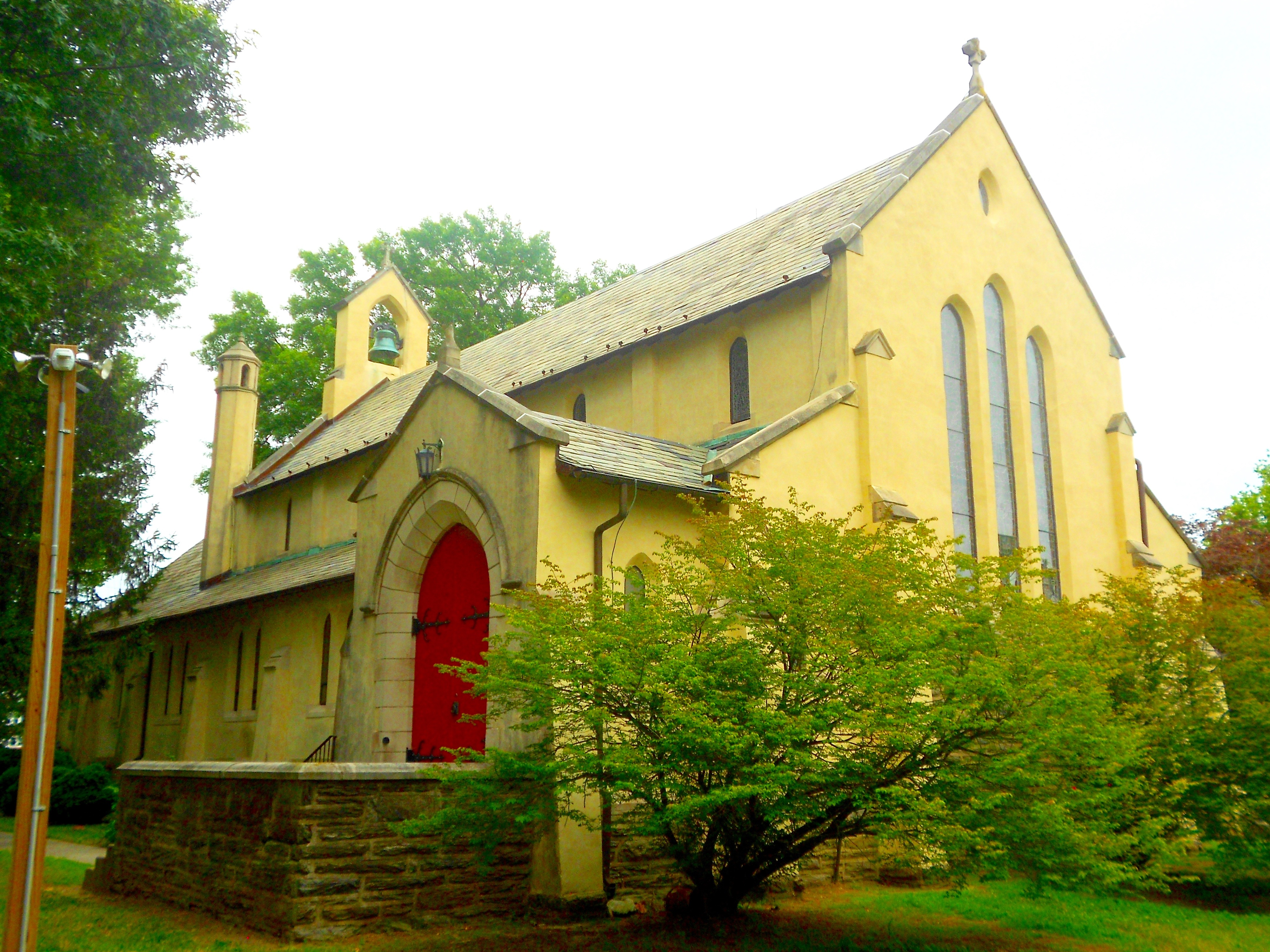
- Church of Our Merciful Saviour

- logo
- Motto: Pride in Progress
- Penns Grove Borough highlighted in Salem County. Inset map: Salem County highlighted in the State of New Jersey.

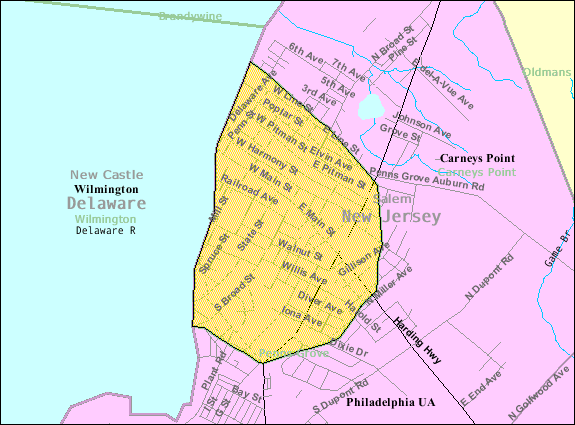
- Census Bureau map of Penns Grove, New Jersey

- Location in Salem County Location in New Jersey Location in the United States
- Coordinates: 39.727704°N 75.469035°W
- Country: United States
- State: New Jersey
- County: Salem
- Incorporated: March 8, 1894
- Named for: William Penn

Government
  - Type: Borough
  - Body: Borough Council
  - Mayor: LaDaena D. Thomas (D, term ends December 31, 2023)
  - Administrator: Robert Tarver (interim)
  - Municipal clerk: Sharon R. Williams

Area
  - Total: 0.89 sq mi (2.31 km^{2})
  - Land: 0.89 sq mi (2.31 km^{2})
  - Water: 0 sq mi (0.00 km^{2}) 0.00%
  - Rank: 517th of 565 in state 15th of 15 in county
- Elevation: 7 ft (2.1 m)

Population (2020)
  - Total: 4,837
  - Estimate (2023): 4,865
  - Rank: 383rd of 565 in state 5th of 15 in county
  - Density: 5,418.8/sq mi (2,092.2/km^{2})
  - Rank: 102nd of 565 in state 1st of 15 in county
- Time zone: UTC−05:00 (Eastern (EST))
  - Summer (DST): UTC−04:00 (Eastern (EDT))
- ZIP Code: 08069
- Area code: 856 exchanges: 299, 351
- FIPS code: 3403357750
- GNIS feature ID: 0885348
- Website: www.pennsgrove-nj.org

Penns Grove is a borough in Salem County, in the U.S. state of New Jersey. As of the 2020 United States census, the borough's population was 4,837, a decrease of 310 (−6.0%) from the 2010 census count of 5,147, which in turn reflected an increase of 261 (+5.3%) from the 4,886 counted in the 2000 census.

Penns Grove had the fourth-highest property tax rate in New Jersey, with an equalized rate of 5.556% in 2020, compared to 3.476% in Salem County and a statewide average of 2.279%.

== History ==
The area was long primarily agricultural. Penns Grove was incorporated as a borough by an act of the New Jersey Legislature on March 8, 1894, from portions of Upper Penns Neck Township (now Carneys Point Township), based on the results of a referendum held two days earlier. It began to industrialize around this time. The borough's name comes from William Penn.

In the early 20th century, many Italian immigrants from Valle San Giovanni and the surrounding southern province of Teramo came to work at the local E.I. DuPont de Nemours plant in Carneys Point. Many settled on Pitman Street in Penns Grove. In 1925, the Italian community arranged to commission a copy of the statue of the Madonna and Child from the Chiesa della Madonna delle Grazie in Teramo, and had it installed in the Saint James Roman Catholic Church in Penns Grove. Other immigrants from eastern Europe also settled in the county, markedly increasing the population.

== Geography ==
According to the United States Census Bureau, Penns Grove borough had a total area of 0.89 square miles (2.31 km^{2}), all of which was land.

The borough borders Carneys Point Township and the Delaware River. The borough is located across the Delaware River from Wilmington, which is part of the Philadelphia metropolitan area, and is 33 miles (53 km) south of the city of Philadelphia.

== Demographics ==
Historical population
Census	Pop.	Note	%±
1900	1,826		—
1910	2,118		16.0%
1920	6,060		186.1%
1930	5,895		−2.7%
1940	6,488		10.1%
1950	6,669		2.8%
1960	6,176		−7.4%
1970	5,727		−7.3%
1980	5,760		0.6%
1990	5,228		−9.2%
2000	4,886		−6.5%
2010	5,147		5.3%
2020	4,837		−6.0%
2023 (est.)	4,865	▲	0.6%
Population sources: 1900–2000 1900–1920; 1900–1910 1910–1930; 1940–2000 2000; 2010 2020

=== 2020 census ===
As of the 2020 census, Penns Grove had a population of 4,837. The median age was 32.4 years. 32.0% of residents were under the age of 18 and 11.1% of residents were 65 years of age or older. For every 100 females there were 87.8 males, and for every 100 females age 18 and over there were 80.6 males age 18 and over.

100.0% of residents lived in urban areas, while 0.0% lived in rural areas.

There were 1,684 households in Penns Grove, of which 41.7% had children under the age of 18 living in them. Of all households, 30.3% were married-couple households, 18.1% were households with a male householder and no spouse or partner present, and 43.7% were households with a female householder and no spouse or partner present. About 26.6% of all households were made up of individuals and 10.1% had someone living alone who was 65 years of age or older.

There were 2,010 housing units, of which 16.2% were vacant. The homeowner vacancy rate was 5.3% and the rental vacancy rate was 9.6%.

Racial composition as of the 2020 census
Race	Number	Percent
White	1,376	28.4%
Black or African American	2,003	41.4%
American Indian and Alaska Native	66	1.4%
Asian	12	0.2%
Native Hawaiian and Other Pacific Islander	0	0.0%
Some other race	908	18.8%
Two or more races	472	9.8%
Hispanic or Latino (of any race)	1,693	35.0%

=== 2010 census ===
The 2010 United States census counted 5,147 people, 1,801 households, and 1,235 families in the borough. The population density was 5,656.0 inhabitants per square mile (2,183.8/km^{2}). There were 2,004 housing units at an average density of 2,202.2 per square mile (850.3/km^{2}). The racial makeup was 41.83% (2,153) White, 39.77% (2,047) Black or African American, 0.66% (34) Native American, 0.49% (25) Asian, 0.00% (0) Pacific Islander, 12.40% (638) from other races, and 4.86% (250) from two or more races. Hispanic or Latino of any race were 28.27% (1,455) of the population.

Of the 1,801 households, 36.8% had children under the age of 18; 29.9% were married couples living together; 31.6% had a female householder with no husband present and 31.4% were non-families. Of all households, 25.3% were made up of individuals and 9.4% had someone living alone who was 65 years of age or older. The average household size was 2.85 and the average family size was 3.38.

32.3% of the population were under the age of 18, 10.1% from 18 to 24, 26.9% from 25 to 44, 21.2% from 45 to 64, and 9.5% who were 65 years of age or older. The median age was 29.7 years. For every 100 females, the population had 89.5 males. For every 100 females ages 18 and older there were 82.5 males.

The Census Bureau's 2006–2010 American Community Survey showed that (in 2010 inflation-adjusted dollars) median household income was $30,104 (with a margin of error of +/− $9,093) and the median family income was $37,663 (+/− $9,442). Males had a median income of $42,908 (+/− $8,706) versus $30,353 (+/− $5,538) for females. The per capita income for the borough was $15,785 (+/− $2,169). About 28.1% of families and 28.2% of the population were below the poverty line, including 41.2% of those under age 18 and 15.8% of those age 65 or over.

=== 2000 census ===
As of the 2000 United States census there were 4,886 people, 1,827 households, and 1,231 families residing in the borough. The population density was 5,275.8 inhabitants per square mile (2,037.0/km^{2}). There were 2,075 housing units at an average density of 2,240.5 per square mile (865.1/km^{2}). The racial makeup of the borough was 48.85% White, 39.75% African American, 0.37% Native American, 0.29% Asian, 0.16% Pacific Islander, 8.13% from other races, and 2.46% from two or more races. Hispanic or Latino of any race were 17.29% of the population.

There were 1,827 households, out of which 38.4% had children under the age of 18 living with them, 34.6% were married couples living together, 27.5% had a female householder with no husband present, and 32.6% were non-families. 28.1% of all households were made up of individuals, and 13.0% had someone living alone who was 65 years of age or older. The average household size was 2.67 and the average family size was 3.26.

In the borough the population was spread out, with 33.0% under the age of 18, 8.9% from 18 to 24, 27.9% from 25 to 44, 18.5% from 45 to 64, and 11.8% who were 65 years of age or older. The median age was 31 years. For every 100 females, there were 85.5 males. For every 100 females age 18 and over, there were 79.6 males.

The median income for a household in the borough was $26,227, and the median income for a family was $34,076. Males had a median income of $30,871 versus $20,983 for females. The per capita income for the borough was $13,330. About 18.1% of families and 21.0% of the population were below the poverty line, including 29.1% of those under age 18 and 13.3% of those age 65 or over.

== Government ==
=== Local government ===
Penns Grove is governed under the borough form of New Jersey municipal government, which is used in 218 municipalities (of the 564) statewide, making it the most common form of government in New Jersey. The governing body is comprised of the mayor and the borough council, with all positions elected at-large on a partisan basis as part of the November general election. The mayor is elected directly by the voters to a four-year term of office. The borough council includes six members elected to serve three-year terms on a staggered basis, with two seats coming up for election each year in a three-year cycle. The borough form of government used by Penns Grove is a "weak mayor / strong council" government in which council members act as the legislative body with the mayor presiding at meetings and voting only in the event of a tie. The mayor can veto ordinances subject to an override by a two-thirds majority vote of the council. The mayor makes committee and liaison assignments for council members, and most appointments are made by the mayor with the advice and consent of the council.

As of 2023, the mayor of Penns Grove is Independent LaDaena D. Thomas, whose term of office ends December 31, 2023; Thomas is the borough's first woman to serve as mayor and the county's first African-American woman to serve as a mayor. Members of the Borough Council are Council President Charlyn Martin (D, 2023), Jonathan Carter (D, 2023), Tracy Marinaro (D, 2025), John C. Rambo (R, 2024), Anjanette Scott (D, 2025) and Sonya Worley (D, 2024).

After losing his re-election campaign in November 2019, Carl J. Washington Jr. resigned from office from his seat that was about to expire and was then appointed to fill the seat expiring in December 2021 that had been held by Rafael Leon until he resigned from office.

In February 2014, the borough council selected Ulpiano Padilla and Deborah Scott from lists of names nominated by the Democratic municipal committee to fill the vacant seats of Darwin Coleman and Stephanie Stewart.

=== Federal, state and county representation ===
Penns Grove is located in the 2nd Congressional District and is part of New Jersey's 3rd state legislative district.

For the 119th United States Congress, New Jersey's 2nd congressional district is represented by Jeff Van Drew (R, Dennis Township). New Jersey is represented in the United States Senate by Democrats Cory Booker (Newark, term ends 2027) and Andy Kim (Moorestown, term ends 2031).

For the 2026–2027 session, the 3rd legislative district of the New Jersey Legislature is represented in the State Senate by John Burzichelli (D, Paulsboro) and in the General Assembly by David Bailey (D, Woodstown) and Heather Simmons (D, Glassboro).

Salem County is governed by a five-member Board of County Commissioners who are elected at-large to serve three-year terms of office on a staggered basis, with either one or two seats coming up for election each year. At an annual reorganization meeting held in the beginning of January, the board selects a Director and a Deputy Director from among its members. As of 2025, Salem County's Commissioners (with party, residence, and term-end year listed in parentheses) are:

Director Benjamin H. Laury (R, Elmer, 2027), Deputy Director Cordy Taylor (R, Oldmans Township, 2028), Paul Collier (R, Lower Alloways Creek, 2027), Ed Ramsey (R, Pittsgrove Township, 2026), and Daniel Timmerman (R, Elmer, 2028).

Constitutional officers elected on a countywide basis are: Clerk Dale A. Cross (R, Pennsville Township, 2029), Sheriff Charles M. Miller (R, Salem, 2027) and Surrogate Gordon J. Ostrum Jr. (R, Pilesgrove Township, 2030).

=== Politics ===
As of March 2011, there were a total of 2,697 registered voters in Penns Grove, of which 1,482 (54.9% vs. 30.6% countywide) were registered as Democrats, 170 (6.3% vs. 21.0%) were registered as Republicans and 1,045 (38.7% vs. 48.4%) were registered as Unaffiliated. There were no voters registered to other parties. Among the borough's 2010 Census population, 52.4% (vs. 64.6% in Salem County) were registered to vote, including 77.4% of those ages 18 and over (vs. 84.4% countywide).

Gubernatorial election results for Penns Grove
Year	Republican		Democratic		Third party(ies)	
Year	No.	%	No.	%	No.	%
2025	190	26.13%	526	72.35%	11	1.51%
2021	172	29.81%	395	68.46%	10	1.73%
2017	139	24.30%	406	70.98%	27	4.72%
2013	357	44.35%	414	51.43%	34	4.22%
2009	205	25.88%	491	61.99%	96	12.12%
2005	258	25.67%	687	68.36%	60	5.97%

In the 2012 presidential election, Democrat Barack Obama received 81.6% of the vote (1,234 cast), ahead of Republican Mitt Romney with 17.5% (265 votes), and other candidates with 0.9% (13 votes), among the 1,524 ballots cast by the borough's 2,902 registered voters (12 ballots were spoiled), for a turnout of 52.5%. In the 2008 presidential election, Democrat Barack Obama received 1,349 votes (76.0% vs. 50.4% countywide), ahead of Republican John McCain with 314 votes (17.7% vs. 46.6%) and other candidates with 13 votes (0.7% vs. 1.6%), among the 1,774 ballots cast by the borough's 3,108 registered voters, for a turnout of 57.1% (vs. 71.8% in Salem County). In the 2004 presidential election, Democrat John Kerry received 1,003 votes (68.0% vs. 45.9% countywide), ahead of Republican George W. Bush with 444 votes (30.1% vs. 52.5%) and other candidates with 14 votes (0.9% vs. 1.0%), among the 1,474 ballots cast by the borough's 2,671 registered voters, for a turnout of 55.2% (vs. 71.0% in the whole county).

United States presidential election results for Penns Grove 2024 2020 2016 2012 2008 2004
Year	Republican		Democratic		Third party(ies)	
Year	No.	%	No.	%	No.	%
2024	347	30.57%	774	68.19%	14	1.23%
2020	361	24.66%	1,080	73.77%	23	1.57%
2016	302	22.60%	996	74.55%	38	2.84%
2012	265	17.53%	1,234	81.61%	13	0.86%
2008	314	18.74%	1,349	80.49%	13	0.78%
2004	444	30.39%	1,003	68.65%	14	0.96%

In the 2013 gubernatorial election, Democrat Barbara Buono received 51.4% of the vote (414 cast), ahead of Republican Chris Christie with 44.3% (357 votes), and other candidates with 4.2% (34 votes), among the 915 ballots cast by the borough's 2,793 registered voters (110 ballots were spoiled), for a turnout of 32.8%. In the 2009 gubernatorial election, Democrat Jon Corzine received 491 ballots cast (58.2% vs. 39.9% countywide), ahead of Republican Chris Christie with 205 votes (24.3% vs. 46.1%), Independent Chris Daggett with 56 votes (6.6% vs. 9.7%) and other candidates with 40 votes (4.7% vs. 2.0%), among the 844 ballots cast by the borough's 3,009 registered voters, yielding a 28.0% turnout (vs. 47.3% in the county).

United States Senate election results for Penns Grove1
Year	Republican		Democratic		Third party(ies)	
Year	No.	%	No.	%	No.	%
2024	313	28.25%	752	67.87%	43	3.88%
2018	233	26.45%	610	69.24%	38	4.31%
2012	223	15.61%	1,162	81.32%	44	3.08%
2006	257	28.78%	599	67.08%	37	4.14%

United States Senate election results for Penns Grove2
Year	Republican		Democratic		Third party(ies)	
Year	No.	%	No.	%	No.	%
2020	308	21.30%	1,053	72.82%	85	5.88%
2014	155	21.06%	548	74.46%	33	4.48%
2013	101	28.53%	251	70.90%	2	0.56%
2008	262	16.83%	1,175	75.47%	120	7.71%

== Education ==
Students in public school for kindergarten through twelfth grade attend the Penns Grove-Carneys Point Regional School District, together with students from Carneys Point Township. As of the 2018–19 school year, the district, comprised of five schools, had an enrollment of 2,185 students and 182.0 classroom teachers (on an FTE basis), for a student–teacher ratio of 12.0:1. Schools in the district (with 2018–19 enrollment data from the National Center for Education Statistics) are Lafayette-Pershing School with 331 students in grades Pre-K to Kindergarten, Field Street School with 480 students in grades 1–3, Paul W. Carleton School with 355 students in grades 4–5, Penns Grove Middle School with 465 students in grades 6–8 and Penns Grove High School with 508 students in grades 9–12.

A majority of students in ninth through twelfth grades from Oldmans Township, New Jersey, attend the district's high school as part of a sending/receiving relationship with the Oldmans Township School District, with the balance attending Woodstown High School in the Woodstown-Pilesgrove Regional School District.

The Catholic K–8 school St. James Elementary School of the Roman Catholic Diocese of Camden closed in 2000, with students redirected to Bishop Guilfoyle Regional Catholic School in Carneys Point, which in turn closed in 2010. As of 2020 Guardian Angels Regional School is a K-8 school that operates under the auspices of the Diocese of Camden and accepts students from Penns Grove. Its PreK-3 campus is in Gibbstown while its 4-8 campus is in Paulsboro.

== Transportation ==
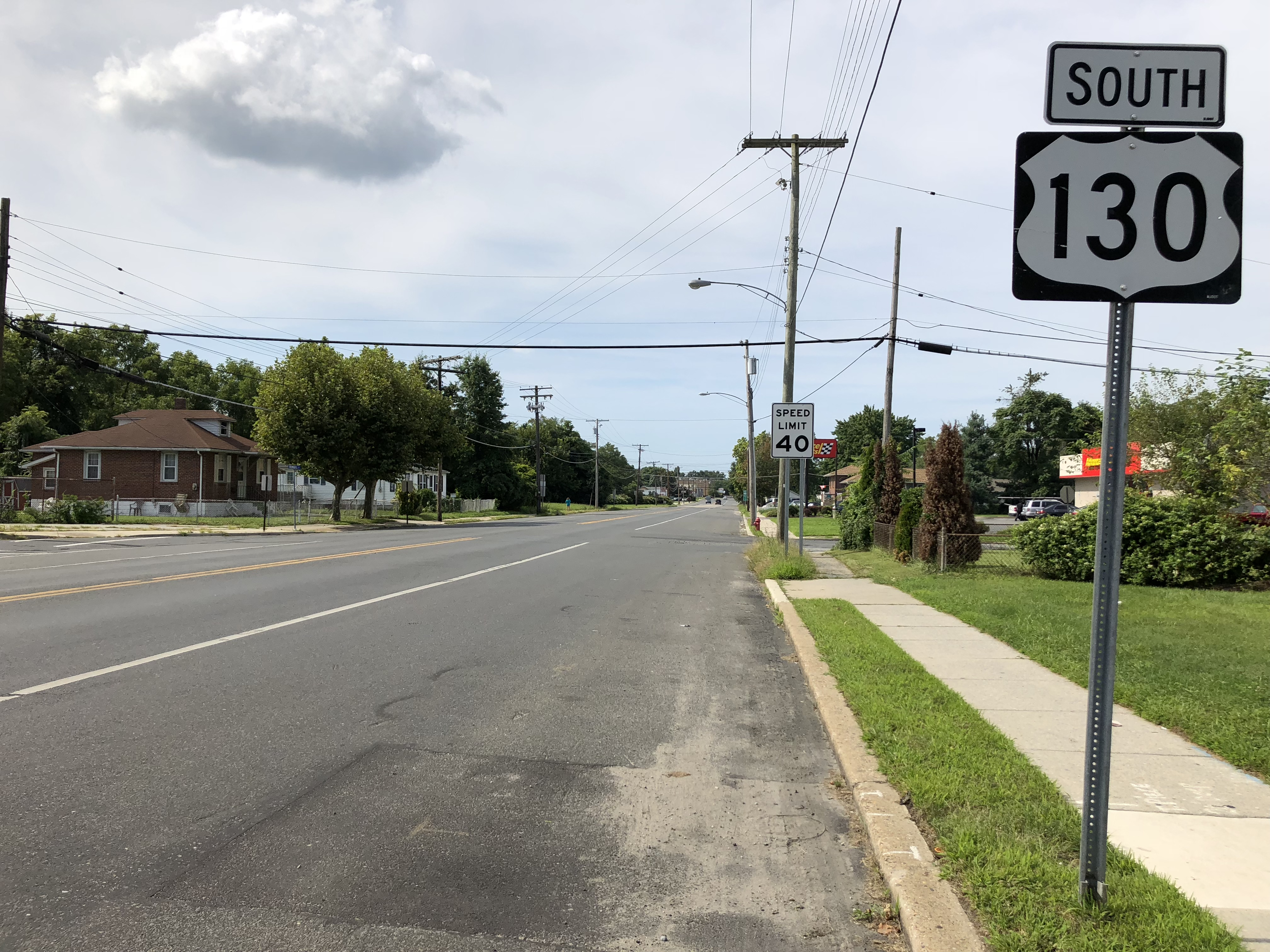
U.S. Route 130 southbound through Penns Grove

=== Roads and highways ===
As of May 2010, the borough had a total of 19.19 miles (30.88 km) of roadways, of which 13.76 miles (22.14 km) were maintained by the municipality, 4.14 miles (6.66 km) by Salem County and 1.29 miles (2.08 km) by the New Jersey Department of Transportation.

U.S. Route 130 (locally called Virginia Avenue) and Route 48 (starting at its western terminus and called Main Street within Penns Grove) both pass through the borough.

=== Public transportation ===
NJ Transit provides bus service between the borough and Philadelphia on the 402 route and to Woodstown on the 468 route.

== Notable people ==
People who were born in, residents of, or otherwise closely associated with Penns Grove include:

- Kenneth A. Black Jr. (1932–2019), politician who served in the New Jersey General Assembly from District 3A from 1968 to 1974
- Don Bragg (1935–2019), Gold medal winner in the pole vault at the 1960 Summer Olympics held in Rome, Italy
- Roy Elsh (1892–1978), professional baseball player
- John Forsythe (1918–2010), television and character actor
- Paul Foster (1931-2021), playwright
- Ernest Martin Hennings (1888–1956), landscape and portrait painter who was a member of the Taos Society of Artists
- Dave Romansky (born 1938), competitive racewalker who represented the United States at the 1968 Summer Olympics
- Bruce Willis (born 1955), actor, moved to Penns Grove as child and graduated from Penns Grove High School
