= Somers Point Bike Path =

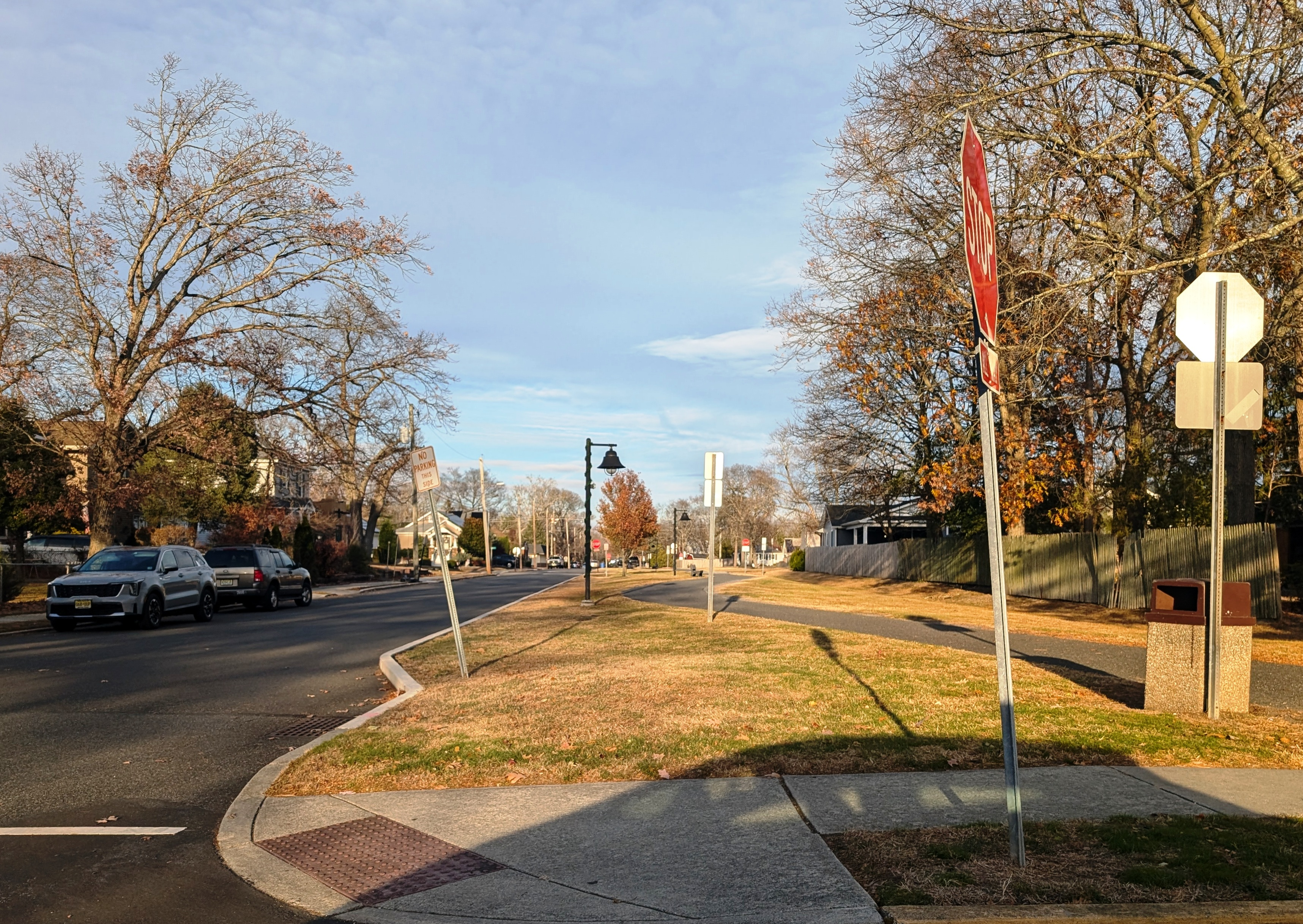
- Path in Northfield
- Length: 8.2 mi (13.2 km)
- Location: Atlantic County, New Jersey
- Trailheads: West Decatur Avenue (Pleasantville); 39°23′30″N 74°31′32″W; West New Jersey Avenue at 1st Avenue (Somers Point); 39°18′48″N 74°35′51″W
- Use: Hiking, Mountain cycling, inline skating, wheelchair accessible, walking, cross country skiing
- Difficulty: Easy
- Season: Year round
- Surface: Asphalt

The Somers Point Bike Path is a multi-use trail in New Jersey with a total length of 6.5 miles (10.5 km).

Four small cities are tied together by this 6.5 mi. trail made up of many small sections with various names. A few blocks from the Atlantic Ocean, a sign that reads "Somers Point Bicycle Path" welcomes you. The trail continues north through Linwood, Northfield, and Pleasantville. The trail continues through neighborhoods, schools, parks, and playing fields providing safer routes for children to walk. The path runs parallel to Shore Road. The path also provides a two-story, 2,800-square foot visitor's centers well as restrooms and parking. Along the path there are also four fishing piers and boardwalks in addition to boat ramps with parking for boat trailers.

== History ==
The Atlantic City and Shore Railroad, also known as the Shore Fast Line opened in 1906, connecting Atlantic City to Somers Point. In 1907, the line extended into Ocean City, and continued operations until 1946, when the bridge across the Great Egg Harbor Bay burned. On January 18, 1948, service along the Shore Fast Line was discontinued and replaced by a bus line. In the 1970s, cities along the former railroad line began removing the track in the 1970s, and converting into a walking path by adding street lights and stop signs. The portion in Linwood was named after George K. Francis, the city's mayor from 1952 to 1971.

The bike path originally existed from Somers Point to southern Linwood. After planning for 10 years, the city of Northfield constructed its bike path in 2000 after receiving a $391,930 grant from the state of New Jersey. On the northern end, the path connects with U.S. Route 30 along local roads in Pleasantville, although the city applied for a grant to build an extension. Pleasantville built portion of its bike path in 2001 at the cost of $178,182 from various grants.

The bike path connects with the newly built bridge along New Jersey Route 52 via Central Avenue, adjacent to Somers Mansion. The state of New Jersey provided a $200,000 grant to extend the path along Central Avenue, with the city of Somers Point covering the remaining $50,000 of the cost. The city applied for another $200,000 grant to finish the project.
