= New Jersey Route 48 =

State highway in Salem County, New Jersey, US

Route 48

Route information
- Maintained by NJDOT
- Length: 4.26 mi (6.86 km)
- Existed: 1927–present

Major junctions
- West end: US 130 / CR 675 in Penns Grove
- I-295 in Carneys Point Township
- East end: US 40 in Carneys Point Township

Location
- Country: United States
- State: New Jersey
- Counties: Salem

Highway system
- New Jersey State Highway Routes; Interstate; US; State; Scenic Byways
← Route 47	→ Route 49

Route 48 is an east–west state highway in Salem County in the U.S. state of New Jersey. It is a 4.26-mile (6.86 km) route running from U.S. Route 130 (US 130) and County Route 675 (CR 675) in Penns Grove southeast to US 40 in Carneys Point Township. It is known as East Main Street from US 130 to DuPont Road, and as the Harding Highway from DuPont Road to its terminus at US 40. Route 48 is signed east–west, although it travels more northwest–southeast throughout its route. It is a two-lane, undivided road through its entire length that intersects with Interstate 295 (I-295) and CR 551.

The road was originally created as Route 18S, running from Penns Grove to Atlantic City, in 1923, before becoming Route 48 in 1927. In Penns Grove, the route ended at a ferry which crossed the Delaware River to Wilmington, Delaware, connecting with Delaware Route 48 (DE 48) until the ferry service was terminated in 1951, when the Delaware Memorial Bridge opened. US 40 was also designated to run along the entire length of the route between Penns Grove and Atlantic City. On two occasions, US 40 has been relocated off portions of Route 48: once following a realignment to a ferry between New Castle, Delaware and Pennsville and again after the Delaware Memorial Bridge and New Jersey Turnpike opened in 1951. Route 48 was designated onto its current alignment in 1953, eliminating the concurrency it shared with US 40 from Carneys Point Township to Atlantic City.

== Route description ==
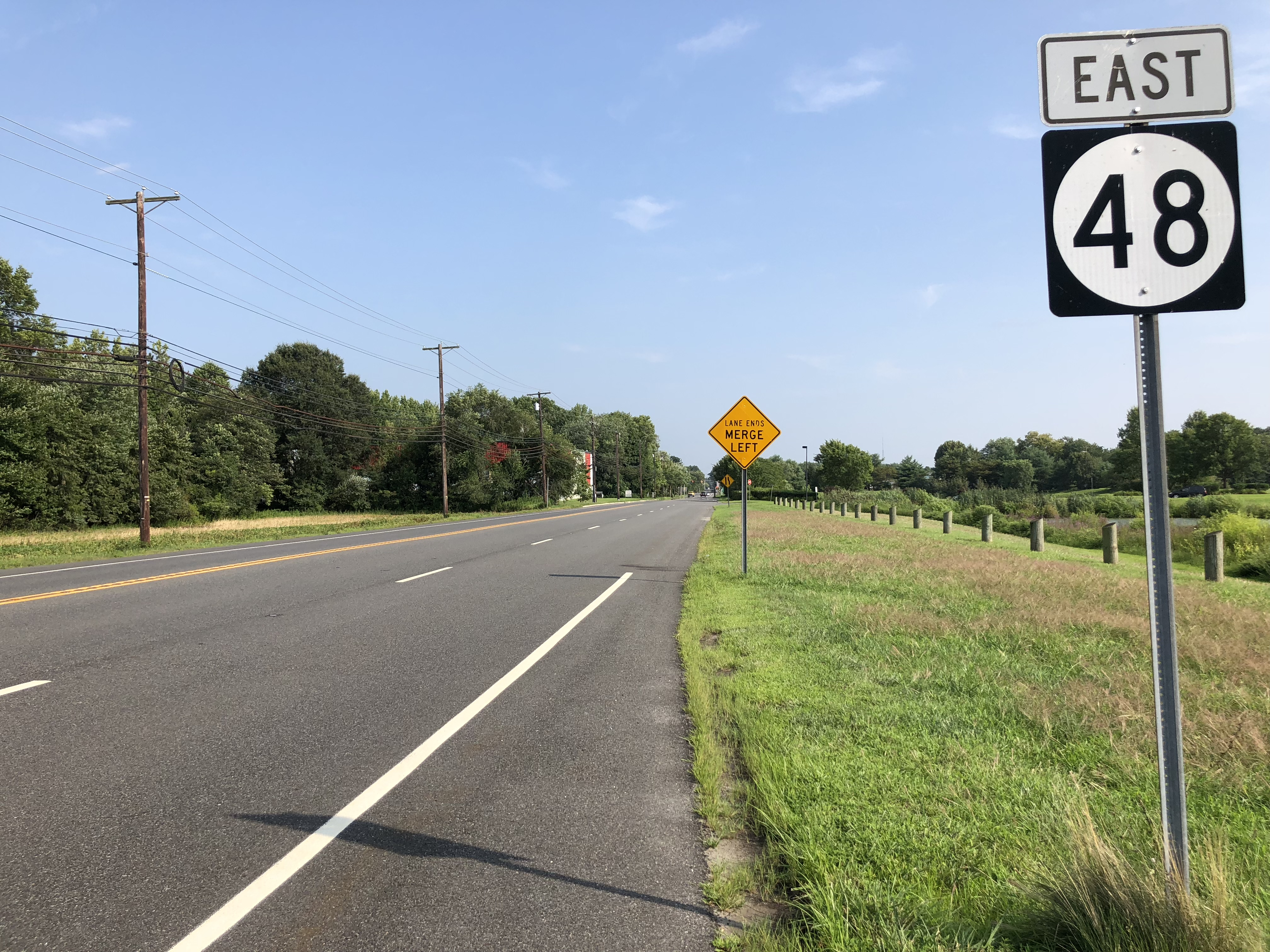
View east along Route 48 just east of I-295 in Carneys Point Township

Route 48 begins at a traffic light with US 130 and CR 675 in Penns Grove, heading to the southeast on Main Street, a two-lane, undivided road. CR 675 continues west on Main Street past US 130. The road passes through residential areas, intersecting with local roads before entering Carneys Point Township. In Carneys Point Township, Route 48 crosses Dupont Road, becoming Harding Highway, and passes by Penns Grove High School, located on the south side of the road. The road enters a more rural setting and intersects CR 601 at a signalized intersection. Shortly after CR 601, the road comes to an interchange with I-295. Route 48 continues southeast through a mix of woodland and farmland, intersecting CR 551 at a traffic light. Just past the CR 551 junction, the road intersects CR 628, passing by Laytons Lake before crossing over the New Jersey Turnpike. Route 48 continues southeast for about another mile, crossing Stumpy Road before ending at an intersection with US 40.

== History ==
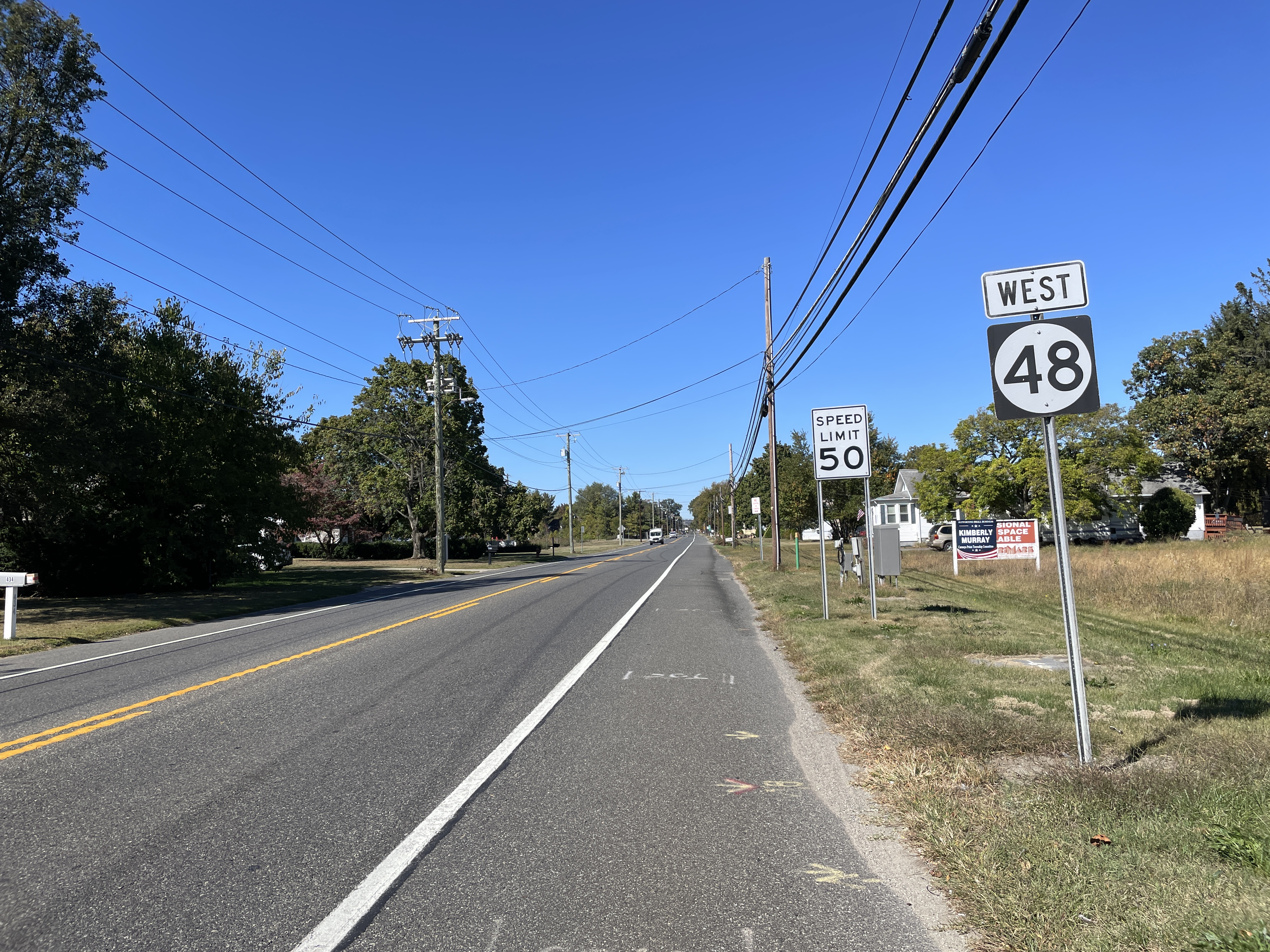
Route 48 westbound past CR 601 in Carneys Point Township

The entirety of the highway was once included in the Woodstown and Penn's Grove Turnpike, chartered in 1852. The turnpike followed what is now US 40 to Woodstown.

The route was designated as Route 18S in 1923, running from Penns Grove southeast to Atlantic City along what was known as the Harding Highway. US 40 was designated along the length of Route 18S, running east from a ferry dock in Penns Grove where the route crossed the Delaware River to Wilmington, Delaware, to continue its journey west. The entire routing of Route 18S was designated Route 48 in the 1927 renumbering of New Jersey state highways, running concurrent with US 40 its entire length. Until the Delaware Memorial Bridge opened in 1951, a ferry connected Route 48 to DE 48 in Wilmington. US 40 had used this ferry, but was eventually moved to a ferry that ran from New Castle, Delaware, to Pennsville, with US 40 being rerouted to follow present-day Route 49, various local roads, and CR 551 to reach Route 48 and continue east along with that route. Following the completion of both the Delaware Memorial Bridge and the New Jersey Turnpike in 1951, US 40 was routed off more of Route 48 onto a new alignment, joining the route at its current eastern terminus. In the 1953 renumbering of New Jersey state highways, Route 48 was designated onto its current alignment from US 130 to US 40, with the rest of the route dropped in favor of the US 40 designation. The old alignment of Route 48 to the ferry terminal is now CR 675.

== Major intersections ==
The entire route is in Salem County.

Location	mi	km	Destinations	Notes
Penns Grove	0.00	0.00	US 130 (Virginia Avenue)	Western terminus of Route 48
Carneys Point Township	1.53	2.46	I-295	Exit 4 (I-295)
Carneys Point Township	2.13	3.43	CR 551 (Pennsville-Auburn Road) – Auburn, Swedesboro, Pennsville	
Carneys Point Township	4.26	6.86	US 40 (Wiley Road) – Woodstown	Eastern terminus of Route 48
1.000 mi = 1.609 km; 1.000 km = 0.621 mi
