= English Creek, New Jersey =

Populated place in Atlantic County, New Jersey, US

- Census-designated place
- Location in Atlantic County Location in New Jersey Location in the United States
- Coordinates: 39.3793684°N 74.6481883°W
- Country: United States
- State: New Jersey
- County: Atlantic
- Township: Egg Harbor
- Elevation: 75 ft (23 m)

Population (2020)
  - Total: 3,364
- Time zone: UTC−05:00 (Eastern (EST))
  - Summer (DST): UTC−04:00 (EDT)
- FIPS code: 34-21540

English Creek is a census-designated place (CDP) located in Atlantic County, in the U.S. state of New Jersey. As of the 2020 census, English Creek had a population of 3,364. It is also the name of a nearby stream.

== Demographics ==
Historical population
Census	Pop.	Note	%±
2020	3,364		—
U.S. Decennial Census; 2020

English Creek first appeared as a census designated place in the 2020 U.S. census.

=== 2020 census ===
As of the 2020 census, English Creek had a population of 3,364. The median age was 50.9 years. 15.3% of residents were under the age of 18 and 28.6% of residents were 65 years of age or older. For every 100 females there were 93.1 males, and for every 100 females age 18 and over there were 92.0 males age 18 and over.

90.9% of residents lived in urban areas, while 9.1% lived in rural areas.

There were 1,427 households in English Creek, of which 23.1% had children under the age of 18 living in them. Of all households, 48.5% were married-couple households, 17.5% were households with a male householder and no spouse or partner present, and 28.0% were households with a female householder and no spouse or partner present. About 29.7% of all households were made up of individuals and 17.4% had someone living alone who was 65 years of age or older.

There were 1,557 housing units, of which 8.3% were vacant. The homeowner vacancy rate was 3.4% and the rental vacancy rate was 5.1%.

English Creek CDP, New Jersey – Racial and ethnic composition Note: the US Census treats Hispanic/Latino as an ethnic category. This table excludes Latinos from the racial categories and assigns them to a separate category. Hispanics/Latinos may be of any race.
Race / Ethnicity (NH = Non-Hispanic)	Pop 2020	2020
White alone (NH)	2,659	79.04%
Black or African American alone (NH)	105	3.12%
Native American or Alaska Native alone (NH)	4	0.12%
Asian alone (NH)	102	3.03%
Native Hawaiian or Pacific Islander alone (NH)	0	0.00%
Other race alone (NH)	13	0.39%
Mixed race or Multiracial (NH)	139	4.13%
Hispanic or Latino (any race)	342	10.17%
Total	3,364	100.00%

== Education ==
The CDP is in the Egg Harbor Township School District.
