= List of county routes in Atlantic County, New Jersey =

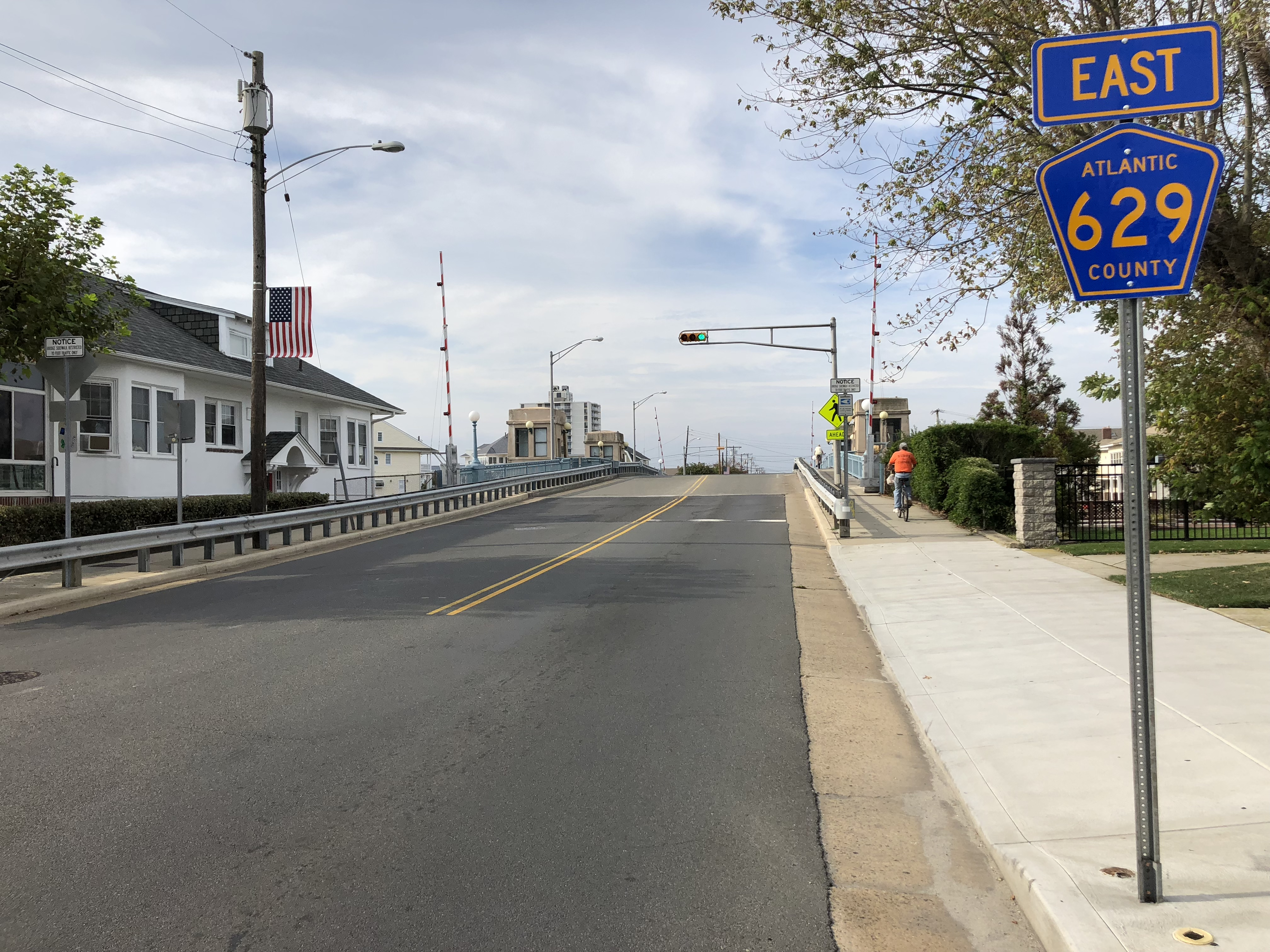
CR 629 in Ventnor City

The following is a list of county routes in Atlantic County in the U.S. state of New Jersey. For more information on the county route system in New Jersey as a whole, including its history, see County routes in New Jersey.

== 500-series county routes ==
In addition to those listed below, the following 500-series county routes serve Atlantic County:

- CR 536, CR 540, CR 542, CR 552, CR 552 Spur, CR 557, CR 557 Truck, CR 559, CR 559 Alt, CR 559 Truck, CR 561, CR 561 Alt, CR 561 Bypass, CR 561 Spur, CR 563, CR 575, CR 585

== Other county routes ==
Route	Length (mi)	Length (km)	From	Via	To	Notes
CR 601	0.96	1.54	White Horse Pike (U.S. Route 30) in Absecon near the Galloway Township border	New Jersey Avenue	New Road (U.S. Route 9) in Absecon	
CR 602	0.95	1.53	Egg Harbor Road (CR 561) and Moss Mill Road (CR 561) in Hammonton	South Egg Harbor Road	White Horse Pike (U.S. Route 30) in Hammonton	
CR 603	0.52	0.84	Black Horse Pike (U.S. Route 40/U.S. Route 322) and English Creek Avenue (CR 575) in Egg Harbor Township	English Creek Avenue	Dead end at the Atlantic City Expressway in Egg Harbor Township	Former alignment of CR 575
CR 604	1.28	2.06	Pearce Road in Egg Harbor Township	English Creek Avenue	Tilton Road (CR 563) in Egg Harbor Township	Former alignment of CR 575
CR 605	0.40	0.64	West Park Avenue in Galloway Township	English Creek Road	Pomona Road (CR 575) in Galloway Township	Former alignment of CR 575
CR 606	0.51	0.82	Harding Highway (U.S. Route 40) in Hamilton Township	Old Harding Highway	Old Harding Highway (CR 559) and Weymouth Road (CR 559) in Hamilton Township	Concurrently with CR 559 Truck its entire length
CR 608	2.72	4.38	Tilton Road (CR 563) in Egg Harbor Township	Washington Avenue, Franklin Avenue	Black Horse Pike (U.S. Route 40/U.S. Route 322) in Pleasantville	
CR 609	1.4	2.25	Washington Avenue (CR 608) in Pleasantville	Doughty Road	Delilah Road (CR 646) in Egg Harbor Township	Transferred from Egg Harbor Township and Pleasantville on June 17, 2020
CR 610	2.43	3.91	New York Road (U.S. Route 9) in Galloway Township	Old New York Road	Main Street (CR 575) and Old New York Road (CR 575) in Port Republic	
CR 611	0.59	0.95	Route 50/CR 557 in Corbin City	Main Street	Route 50/CR 557 in Corbin City	Former alignment of Route 50
CR 612	5.18	8.34	Elwood Road (CR 623) in Mullica Township	Weekstown Road	Pleasant Mills Road (CR 643) in Mullica Township	
CR 613	3.11	5.01	White Horse Pike (U.S. Route 30) in Hammonton	Middle Road	US 206 in Hammonton	
CR 614	7.53	12.12	Harding Highway (U.S. Route 40) in Hamilton Township	Cologne Avenue	Moss Mill Road (CR 561 Alt.) in Galloway Township	
CR 615	8.05	12.96	Somers Point–Mays Landing Road (CR 559) in Egg Harbor Township	Zion Road	Shore Road (CR 585) in Northfield	
CR 616	0.36	0.58	Harding Highway (U.S. Route 40) and Mill Street (Route 50) in Hamilton Township	Mill Street	Old Harding Highway (CR 559) in Hamilton Township	
CR 617	0.36	0.58	Harding Highway (U.S. Route 40/Route 50) in Hamilton Township	Somers Point–Mays Landing Road	Harding Highway (US 40) and Somers Point–Mays Landing Road (CR 559) in Hamilton Township	Concurrently with CR 559 Truck southbound its entire length
CR 618	2.07	3.33	New York Road (U.S. Route 9) in Galloway Township	Leeds Point Road	Moss Mill Road (CR 561 Alt.) in Galloway Township	
CR 619	3.12	5.02	East Wheat Road (CR 619) at the Cumberland County line in Buena	Wheat Road	Harding Highway (U.S. Route 40/CR 557) and Blue Anchor Road (Route 54) on the Buena/Buena Vista Township border	
CR 620	0.21	0.34	Shore Road (CR 585) in Somers Point	Maryland Avenue	Bay Avenue (former CR 635) in Somers Point; continues as Route 152	
CR 622	0.32	0.51	Harding Highway (U.S. Route 40) and Cedar Avenue (CR 540) in Buena Vista Township	Cedar Avenue	Railroad Boulevard in Buena Vista Township	
CR 623	10.74	17.28	Weymouth Road (CR 559) in Hamilton Township	Elwood Road	Nesco Road (CR 542) in Mullica Township	
CR 624	7.69	12.38	Philadelphia Avenue (CR 563) in Egg Harbor City	Clarks Landing Road	Old New York Road (CR 575) in Port Republic	
CR 627	2.46	3.96	Oak Road (CR 681) in Buena Vista Township	South Central Avenue	Harding Highway (U.S. Route 40/CR 557) in Buena	
CR 629	5.53	8.90	Route 152 on the Longport/Egg Harbor Township border	Ventnor Avenue, North Dorset Avenue, Wellington Avenue, West End Avenue	Black Horse Pike (U.S. Route 40/U.S. Route 322) in Atlantic City	Part of Ocean Drive
CR 630	1.06	1.71	Mill Road (CR 651) in Absecon	Ohio Avenue	Shore Road (CR 585) in Absecon	
CR 631	0.15	0.24	Shore Road (CR 585) in Absecon	Illinois Avenue (Dr. Ruppert Avenue)	White Horse Pike (U.S. Route 30) in Absecon	
CR 633	1.68	2.70	White Horse Pike (U.S. Route 30) in Galloway Township	Jimmie Leeds Road	Jimmie Leeds Road (CR 561) and Duerer Street (CR 561) in Galloway Township	
CR 634	6.24	10.04	Church Street in Absecon	Pitney Road	Old New York Road (CR 610) in Port Republic	
CR 635	0.91	1.46	Shore Road (CR 585) in Somers Point	Goll Avenue, Bay Avenue	Maryland Avenue (Route 152/CR 620) in Somers Point	Returned to Somers Point c. 2014
CR 637	5.44	8.75	Estell Manor Road at the Cumberland County line in Estell Manor	Cumberland Avenue	Route 50 in Estell Manor	
CR 638	3.91	6.29	Route 87 in Brigantine	Brigantine Boulevard, Brigantine Avenue	Dead end in Brigantine	
CR 640	2.20	3.54	Weymouth Road (CR 559) and South Chew Road (CR 559) in Hamilton Township	Weymouth Road	White Horse Pike (U.S. Route 30) in Hammonton	
CR 643	4.31	6.94	CR 563 in Mullica Township	Pleasant Mills Road	Elwood Road (CR 623) in Mullica Township	
CR 644	0.86	1.38	Pleasantville/Northfield border	Dauphin Avenue	Shore Road (CR 585) in Northfield	
CR 645	0.62	1.00	Head of River Road (CR 648) in Corbin City	Buck Hill Road	Route 50/CR 557 in Estell Manor	
CR 646	7.68	12.36	Black Horse Pike (U.S. Route 40/U.S. Route 322) in Hamilton Township	Delilah Road	Absecon Boulevard (U.S. Route 30) in Absecon	
CR 647	3.16	5.09	Moss Mill Road (CR 561 Alt.) in Galloway Township	Cologne–Port Republic Road	Clarks Landing Road (CR 624) in Port Republic	
CR 648	1.41	2.27	Head of River Road (CR 649) and Aetna Drive (CR 649) in Estell Manor	Head of River Road	Route 50/CR 557 in Corbin City	
CR 649	4.15	6.68	Route 49 in Estell Manor	Aetna Drive	Main Street (CR 611) in Corbin City	
CR 650	0.87	1.40	Clarks Landing Road (CR 624) in Port Republic	Chestnut Neck Road	Chestnut Neck Road (CR 575) and Old New York Road (CR 575) in Port Republic	
CR 651	12.64	20.34	Morris Avenue in Egg Harbor Township	Jeffers Landing Road, Steelmanville Road, Bargaintown Road, Fire Road, Mill Road	New Road (U.S. Route 9), Wyoming Avenue (US 9), and Pitney Road (CR 634) in Absecon	
CR 652	2.09	3.36	Egg Harbor–Green Bank Road (CR 563) in Egg Harbor City	Lower Bank Road	Lower Bank Road (CR 652) at the Burlington County line in Egg Harbor City	
CR 654	0.40	0.64	White Horse Pike (U.S. Route 30) in Galloway Township	6th Avenue	Jimmie Leeds Road (CR 561) in Galloway Township	
CR 655	1.90	3.06	Lincoln Avenue (CR 655) at the Cumberland County line in Buena Vista Township	Lincoln Avenue	Wheat Road (CR 619) in Buena	
CR 657	2.29	3.69	Old New York Road (CR 610) in Galloway Township	Motts Creek Road	Motts Creek Docks in Galloway Township	
CR 658	5.28	8.50	White Horse Pike (U.S. Route 30) in Mullica Township	Columbia Road	Nesco Road (CR 542) in Mullica Township	
CR 659	0.28	0.45	Zion Road (CR 615) in Egg Harbor Township	Central Avenue	Dead end in Egg Harbor Township	Returned to Egg Harbor Township on June 17, 2020
CR 660	0.16	0.26	Somers Point–Mays Landing Road (CR 617) in Hamilton Township	Farragut Avenue	Main Street (U.S. Route 40/CR 559) in Hamilton Township	
CR 661	0.46	0.74	Dead end in Egg Harbor Township	Central Avenue	Egg Harbor Township/Linwood border	Returned to Egg Harbor Township on June 17, 2020
CR 662	5.07	8.16	Ocean Heights Avenue (CR 559 Alt.) in Egg Harbor Township	Mill Road	Shore Road (CR 585), Tilton Road (CR 563), and Mill Road (CR 563) in Northfield	
CR 663	1.34	2.16	Fire Road (CR 651) in Pleasantville	California Avenue	Main Street (CR 585) in Pleasantville	
CR 665	0.76	1.22	New Road (U.S. Route 9) in Somers Point	New York Avenue	Bay Avenue (formerly CR 635) in Somers Point	
CR 666	8.09	13.02	Route 49 in Estell Manor	Cape May Avenue	Tuckahoe Road (CR 557) in Weymouth Township	
CR 668	0.94	1.51	11th Avenue (CR 669) in Weymouth Township	Walkers Forge Road	Harding Highway (U.S. Route 40) and Old Harding Highway (CR 606) in Hamilton Township	
CR 669	6.06	9.75	Cape May Avenue (CR 666) in Weymouth Township	11th Avenue	Route 50 in Weymouth Township	
CR 670	3.58	5.76	Cologne Avenue (CR 614) in Hamilton Township	Almond Avenue, Leipzig Avenue	Tilton Road (CR 563) in Galloway Township	
CR 671	2.46	3.96	Union Road (CR 671) at the Cumberland County line in Buena Vista Township	Union Road	Tuckahoe Road (CR 557) in Buena Vista Township	
CR 672	2.61	4.20	Brewster Road (CR 672) at the Cumberland County line in Buena	Brewster Road	Harding Highway (U.S. Route 40/CR 557) in Buena	
CR 674	2.59	4.17	White Horse Pike (U.S. Route 30/CR 563) on the Galloway Township/Egg Harbor City border	Bremen Avenue	Renault Winery entrance on the Galloway Township/Egg Harbor City border	
CR 678	1.59	2.56	North Chew Road (CR 559) in Hammonton	13th Street, Fairview Avenue	White Horse Pike (U.S. Route 30) in Hammonton	
CR 679	1.08	1.74	Pleasant Mills Road (CR 542) in Hammonton	Main Road	White Horse Pike (U.S. Route 30) and Broadway (CR 680) in Hammonton	
CR 680	0.70	1.13	Central Avenue (CR 542) in Hammonton	Broadway	White Horse Pike (U.S. Route 30) and Main Road (CR 679) in Hammonton	
CR 681	2.78	4.47	East Oak Road (CR 681) at the Cumberland County line in Buena Vista Township	Oak Road	Tuckahoe Road (CR 557) in Buena Vista Township	
CR 682	1.84	2.96	Brewster Road (CR 672) in Buena	West Summer Avenue	Harding Highway (U.S. Route 40/CR 557) in Buena	
CR 684	3.01	4.84	Mill Road (CR 662) in Egg Harbor Township	Spruce Avenue	Black Horse Pike (U.S. Route 40/U.S. Route 322) in Egg Harbor Township	Extended south to a dead end near Jackson Drive until June 17, 2020, when this portion was returned to Egg Harbor Township
CR 685	2.63	4.23	Delilah Road (CR 646) in Egg Harbor Township	Wescoat Road	Mill Road (CR 651) in Absecon	
CR 686	5.19	8.35	Philadelphia Avenue (Route 50) in Galloway Township	Aloe Street	English Creek Road (CR 605) in Galloway Township	
CR 687	1.37	2.20	Black Horse Pike (U.S. Route 40/U.S. Route 322) in Egg Harbor Township	Old Egg Harbor Road (Tilton Avenue), Tilton Road	New Road (U.S. Route 9) in Pleasantville	
CR 688	2.46	3.96	12th Street (Route 54) in Hammonton	1st Road	Weymouth Road (CR 640) in Hammonton	
CR 689	0.97	1.56	1st Road (CR 688) in Hammonton	9th Street, Grand Street 10th Street	1st Road (CR 688) in Hammonton	Returned to Hammonton c. 2014
CR 690	2.78	4.47	Weymouth Road at the Gloucester County line in Buena	Weymouth Road	Blue Anchor Road (Route 54) in Buena Vista Township	
CR 691	0.47	0.76	Zion Road (CR 615) on the Northfield/Linwood border	Burroughs Road	Oak Avenue on the Northfield/Linwood border	
CR 692	0.10	0.16	Atlantic City Expressway, Baltic Avenue, and Fairmount Avenue in Atlantic City	Christopher Columbus Boulevard	Arctic Avenue in Atlantic City	Returned to Atlantic City c. 2014
CR 693	3.42	5.50	US 206 in Hammonton	Columbia Road, Airport Road	Nesco Road (CR 542) Hammonton	
CR 694	0.09	0.14	Arctic Avenue in Atlantic City	Arkansas Avenue	Atlantic City Expressway, Baltic Avenue, and Fairmount Avenue in Atlantic City	Returned to Atlantic City c. 2014
CR 697	0.23	0.37	Franklin Avenue in Pleasantville	Old Turnpike	Dead end in Pleasantville	
CR 724	1.83	2.95	Central Avenue (CR 542) in Hammonton	3rd Street, Wiltseys Mill Road	Wiltseys Mill Road (CR 724) at the Camden County line in Hammonton	
Former routes
