= Egg Harbor, New Jersey =

Egg Harbor, New Jersey may refer to:

- Egg Harbor Township, New Jersey, US
- Egg Harbor City, New Jersey, US

== See also ==
- Little Egg Harbor Township, New Jersey, US
- Great Egg Harbor Bay, a bay located on the southern New Jersey coast, US
