= County Route 559 (New Jersey) =

County highway in New Jersey, U.S.

County Route 559
- CR 559 highlighted in red, alternate routes in pink

Route information
- Length: 30.84 mi (49.63 km)
- Tourist routes: Pine Barrens Byway

Major junctions
- South end: Route 52 / CR 585 in Somers Point
- US 9 in Somers Point CR 559 Alt. in Hamilton Township; US 40 / Route 50 in Hamilton Township; US 322 in Hamilton Township; Route 54 in Hammonton
- North end: CR 561 in Hammonton

Location
- Country: United States
- State: New Jersey
- Counties: Atlantic

Highway system
- County routes in New Jersey; 500-series routes
← CR 557	→ CR 560

County Route 559 (CR 559) is a county highway in the U.S. state of New Jersey. The highway extends 30.84 miles (49.63 km) from the former Somers Point Circle at MacArthur Boulevard (Route 52) in Somers Point to Egg Harbor Road (CR 561) in Hammonton.

== Route description ==
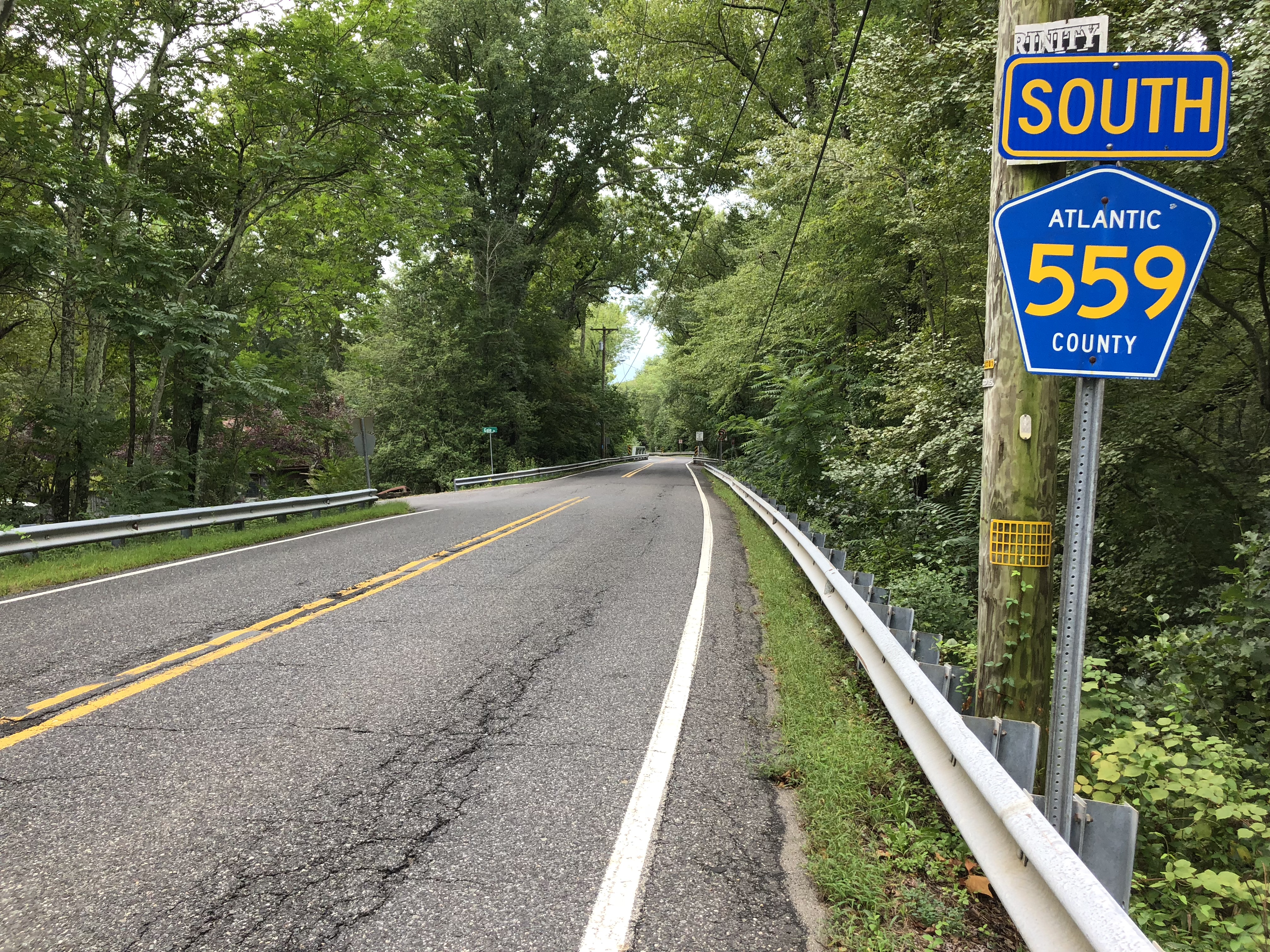
View south along CR 559 just south of CR 623 in Hamilton Township

CR 559 begins at an intersection with Route 52 and the southern terminus of CR 585 (the former Somers Point Circle) in Somers Point, Atlantic County, heading west on two-lane undivided Somers Point-Mays Landing Road. The route runs between the Greate Bay Golf Club to the north and marshland to the south as it comes to the US 9 junction. From this point, the road runs near some residential areas prior to passing under the Garden State Parkway and crossing the marshy Patcong Creek into Egg Harbor Township. CR 559 heads northwest passes marshland and homes before turning north-northwest into wooded areas with a few residences. The route crosses CR 651 and crosses the Lake Creek as heads northwest through more rural areas, turning more to the west as it intersects CR 575. After this intersection, the road crosses the English Creek and runs through more forested areas with some development as it comes to the CR 615 junction. Here, CR 559 turns west and northwest again through more rural areas, eventually turning north as it begins to run a short distance to the east of the Great Egg Harbor River. The route continues into Hamilton Township, where the road turns northeast into increasing areas of forested residential development. This is where the road intersects CR 559 Alternate. The road continues northwest past more forests and development, coming to an intersection with US 40 and CR 617 in the community of Mays Landing.

At this point, CR 559 forms a concurrency with US 40 and heads west through areas of homes and businesses on Main Street, coming to an intersection with Route 50. At this point, US 40 and CR 559 Truck head south on Route 50 and CR 559 continues west past more residences before turning south onto Lenape Street and crossing Lake Lenape. The route leaves Mays Landing as it turns west onto Weymouth Road, with CR 616 heading south along Lenape Street. CR 559 enters densely forested areas as it intersects the northern terminus of CR 559 Truck and CR 606 and turns to the north-northwest. The road continues northwest through the forests, with occasional residences, prior to turning north and then northeast as it meets US 322 (Black Horse Pike) at a modified traffic circle. From here, the route passes over the Great Egg Harbor River again and intersects CR 623, at which point CR 559 turns northwest. The road runs through more forests before making a turn to the north and running between woods to the west and farms to the east. CR 559 passes over the Atlantic City Expressway before splitting from Weymouth Road by heading northwest on 2nd Road, with CR 640 continuing north on Weymouth Road. The road runs through more forests before entering Hammonton at the 7th Street intersection, where it enters a mix of farms, woods, and homes. The route turns north onto Chew Road and continues to an intersection with Route 54. Past this intersection, CR 559 runs through residential areas, intersecting CR 678 before turning northwest and reaching its northern terminus at 15th Street a short distance from CR 561.

== History ==
As part of improvements to Route 52, including the construction of a new causeway over the Great Egg Harbor Bay, the Somers Point Circle at the southern terminus of County Route 559 was replaced with a traffic light in October 2010.

Due to damage caused by Hurricane Irene to a bridge over English Creek, CR 559 was closed to through traffic from CR 575 to CR 615 from August 2011 to June 12, 2015. From October 2015 to May 2016, traffic from CR 575 to CR 559 Alternate was detoured for replacement of the Catawba Bridge over Miry Run. The replacement bridge opened in May 2016.

== Major intersections ==
The entire route is in Atlantic County.

Location	mi	km	Destinations	Notes
Somers Point	0.00	0.00	Route 52 – Northfield, Ocean City CR 585 north (Shore Road) – Atlantic City, Pleasantville	Former Somers Point Circle; southern terminus
Somers Point	0.75	1.21	US 9 (New Road) – Cape May, Absecon	
Egg Harbor Township	5.23	8.42	CR 575 north (English Creek Road)	Southern terminus of CR 575
Hamilton Township	12.05	19.39	CR 559 Alt. south (Ocean Heights Avenue)	Northern terminus of CR 559 Alt.
Hamilton Township	14.07	22.64	US 40 east – Atlantic City CR 559 Truck ends / CR 617 west (Somers Point-Mays Landing Road)	South end of US 40 overlap; southern terminus of CR 559 Truck southbound
Hamilton Township	14.41	23.19	US 40 west / Route 50 / CR 559 Truck north (Cape May Avenue)	North end of US 40 overlap; southern terminus of CR 559 Truck northbound
Hamilton Township	15.33	24.67	CR 559 Truck south / CR 606 west (Old Harding Highway) to US 40 – Cape May	Northern terminus of CR 559 Truck
Hamilton Township	20.32	32.70	US 322 (Black Horse Pike) – Williamstown, Atlantic City	Modified traffic circle
Hammonton	29.15	46.91	Route 54 (12th Street) – Buena, Trenton	
Hammonton	30.84	49.63	CR 561 (Egg Harbor Road)	Northern terminus
1.000 mi = 1.609 km; 1.000 km = 0.621 mi: Concurrency terminus

== Special routes ==
=== CR 559 Alternate ===
County Route 559 Alternate
- Location: Linwood–Hamilton Township
- Length: 9.49 mi (15.27 km)

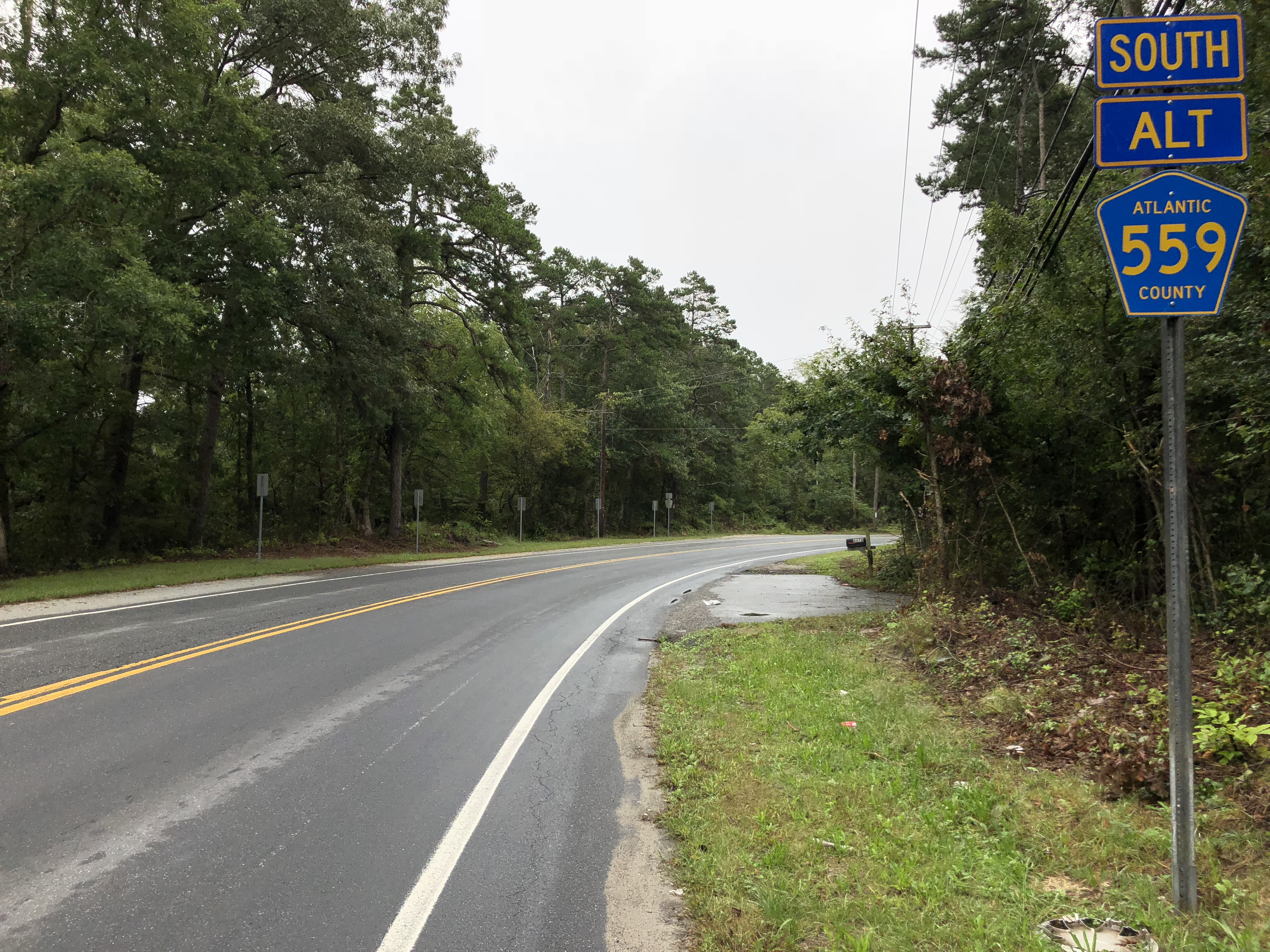
View south along CR 559 Alt at CR 559 in Hamilton Township

County Route 559 Alternate, abbreviated CR 559 Alt, is a county highway in the U.S. state of New Jersey. The highway extends 9.49 miles (15.27 km) from Shore Road (CR 585) on the boundary of Linwood and Somers Point to Somers Point-Mays Landing Road (CR 559) in Hamilton Township.

The road travels through the following municipalities (from South to North):

- Linwood (Atlantic County)
- Egg Harbor Township
- Hamilton Township (Atlantic County)

Major intersections
The entire route is in Atlantic County.

Location	mi	km	Destinations	Notes
Somers Point–Linwood line	0.00	0.00	CR 585 (Shore Road)	Southern terminus
Somers Point–Linwood line	0.46	0.74	US 9 (New Road) to G.S. Parkway – Cape May, Absecon	
Egg Harbor Township	5.23	8.42	CR 575 (English Creek Road)	
Hamilton Township	9.49	15.27	CR 559 (Somers Point-Mays Landing Road) to US 40 – Somers Point, Ocean City, Mays Landing	Northern terminus
1.000 mi = 1.609 km; 1.000 km = 0.621 mi

=== CR 559 Truck ===
County Route 559 Truck
- Location: Mays Landing
- Length: 1.90 mi (3.06 km)

County Route 559 Truck (CR 559 Truck) is a truck bypass of the portion of CR 559 through Mays Landing. The truck route begins at US 40/Route 50/CR 559 in Mays Landing. Northbound, the truck route heads south along US 40/Route 50 from CR 559. Southbound, trucks are directed to follow CR 617 (Somers Point-Mays Landing Road) from US 40/Route 50 east to US 40 and CR 559 east of Mays Landing. From the CR 617 intersection, CR 559 Truck continues to follow US 40/Route 50, curving to the west. Route 50 splits to the south, and CR 559 Truck continues west concurrent with US 40 and CR 557 Truck. CR 559 Truck splits from US 40/CR 557 Truck by heading northeast on CR 606 (Old Harding Highway). The truck route follows CR 606 until it ends at an intersection with CR 559 west of Mays Landing.

Major intersections
The entire route is in Hamilton Township, Atlantic County.

mi	km	Destinations	Notes
0.00	0.00	US 40 east / CR 559 (Main Street) – Atlantic City Route 50 north (Cape May Avenue) – Egg Harbor	Southern terminus northbound, south end of US 40/Route 50 overlap
0.19	0.31	CR 559 Truck south / CR 617 east (Somers Point-Mays Landing Road)	Southbound CR 559 Truck follows CR 617 east to US 40/CR 559
0.62	1.00	Route 50 / CR 557 Truck south (Mill Street) – Wildwood, Cape May	North end of Route 50 overlap, south end of CR 557 Truck overlap
1.39	2.24	US 40 west (Harding Highway)	North end of US 40/CR 557 Truck overlap, south end of CR 606 overlap
1.90	3.06	CR 559 (Weymouth Road)	Northern terminus, north end of CR 606 overlap
1.000 mi = 1.609 km; 1.000 km = 0.621 mi: Concurrency terminus
