= County Route 585 (New Jersey) =

County highway in New Jersey, U.S.

County Route 585
- CR 585 highlighted in red

Route information
- Length: 9.57 mi (15.40 km)

Major junctions
- South end: Route 52 / CR 559 in Somers Point
- CR 563 in Northfield; US 40 / US 322 in Pleasantville
- North end: US 30 in Absecon

Location
- Country: United States
- State: New Jersey
- Counties: Atlantic

Highway system
- County routes in New Jersey; 500-series routes
← CR 583	→ CR 501

County Route 585 (CR 585) is a county highway in the U.S. state of New Jersey. The highway extends from MacArthur Boulevard (Route 52) in Somers Point to Absecon Boulevard (U.S. Route 30 or US 30) in Absecon.

== Route description ==
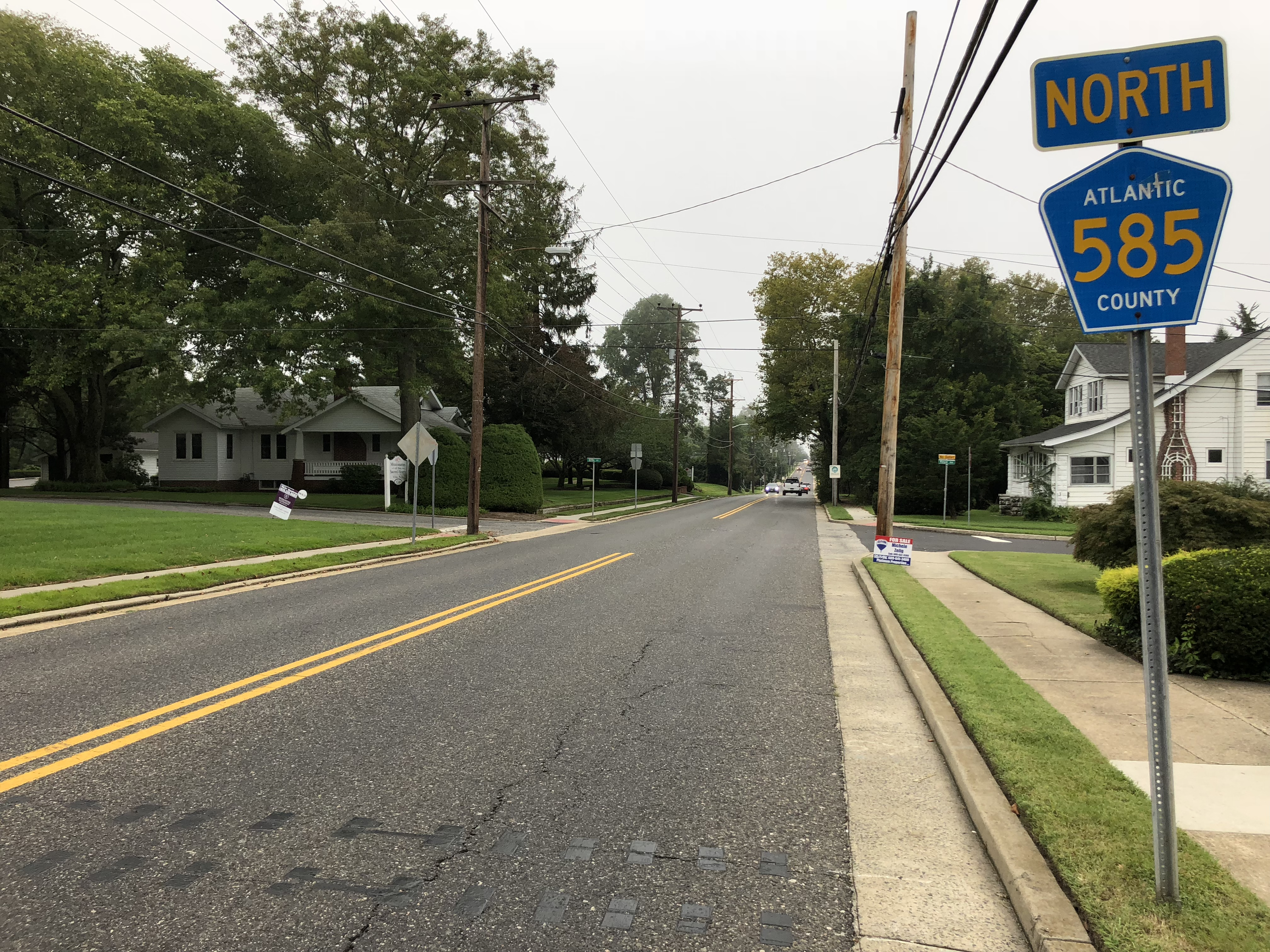
View north along CR 585 at Royal Avenue in Linwood

CR 585 begins at the former location of the Somers Point Circle in Somers Point, intersecting Route 52 and the southern terminus of CR 559. The route heads north-northeast on two-lane undivided Shore Road through residential and commercial areas, intersecting CR 635 and CR 665 before passing west of Shore Medical Center and coming to CR 620, which provides access to Route 152. CR 585 intersects with the eastern terminus of CR 559 Alternate at the point it crosses into Linwood. In Linwood, the road passes several homes as well as the Linwood Country Club. Continuing into Northfield, CR 585 reaches a junction with CR 563 and CR 662. Past this intersection, the road turns northeast and passes the Atlantic City Country Club and meets CR 615 and CR 644.

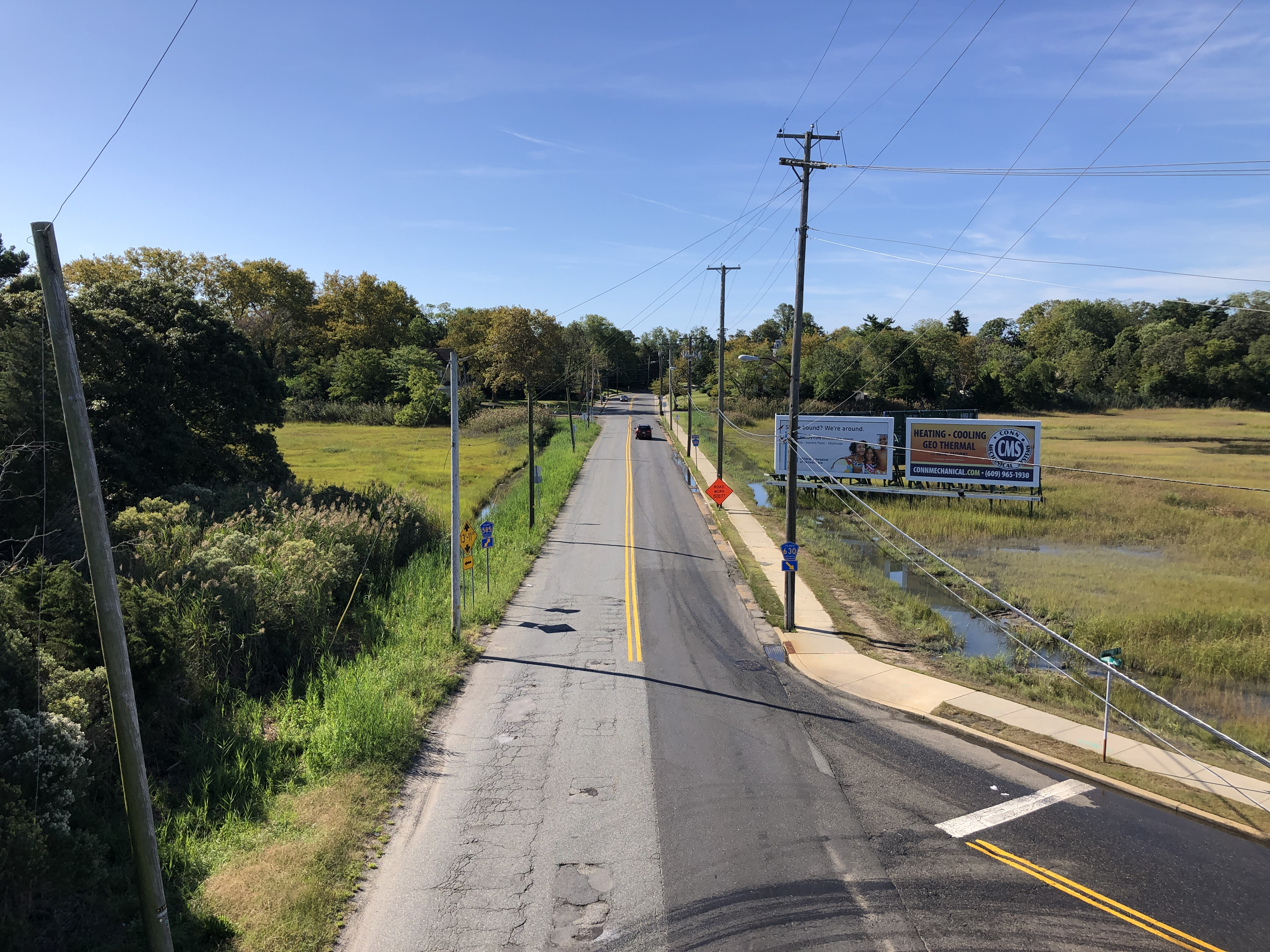
View southbound along CR 585 from the Atlantic City Line in Absecon

Upon entering Pleasantville, the route becomes Main Street and passes a mix of homes and businesses as it reaches the US 40/US 322 junction. Following this, CR 585 crosses the Southern Railroad of New Jersey's Pleasantville Industrial Track line and CR 608 as it heads through commercial areas. The road passes over the Atlantic City Expressway as it enters a mix of homes and commercial establishments. The route crosses CR 646 before intersecting CR 663, at which point it enters Absecon. In Absecon, CR 585 becomes Shore Road again and passes residences, intersecting CR 631 and CR 630. Immediately after the intersection with the latter, the route passes under NJ Transit’s Atlantic City Line and reaches US 30. Here, CR 585 ends and Shore Road continues north as Route 157.

== History ==
Route of former CR 585 in blue, former CR 585 Spur in purple

CR 585 once continued farther to the south, ending at Route 109 in Lower Township, Cape May County. From its current southern terminus, it followed Route 52 into Ocean City, where it then continued on 9th Street before heading south on CR 656. It then headed west onto CR 623 into Upper Township. The route then headed to the southwest on CR 631 and then onto CR 610 passing through the eastern part of Woodbine and entering Dennis Township. CR 585 then ran concurrent with Route 47 through South Dennis before heading to the south on CR 657. It headed into Middle Township and into Cape May Court House, where CR 657 currently continues to Stone Harbor. At this point, CR 585 headed south concurrent with US 9. It then headed east on Route 147 into North Wildwood, where it turned south on CR 621. It then shifted to Park Boulevard, which carried it south through Wildwood and into Wildwood Crest, where it rejoined CR 621. It then headed into Lower Township to its terminus at Route 109.

A spur route, CR 585 Spur, existed, which is now CR 618.

As part of improvements to Route 52, including the construction of a new causeway over the Great Egg Harbor Bay, the Somers Point Circle at the southern terminus of CR 585 was replaced with a traffic light in October 2010.

== Major intersections ==
The entire route is in Atlantic County.

Location	mi	km	Destinations	Notes
Somers Point	0.00	0.00	Route 52 to G.S. Parkway – Ocean City, Northfield CR 559 north (Mays Landing Road) – Mays Landing	Former Somers Point Circle; southern terminus
Somers Point	1.53	2.46	CR 559 Alt. north (Ocean Heights Avenue)	Southern terminus of CR 559 Alt.
Northfield	4.60	7.40	CR 563 (Tilton Road/Mill Road) to US 40 / US 322 / G.S. Parkway / A.C. Expressway	
Pleasantville	6.91	11.12	US 40 / US 322 (Verona Avenue)	
Absecon	9.57	15.40	US 30 (White Horse Pike) – Hammonton, Atlantic City Route 157 north (Shore Road)	Northern terminus; southern terminus of Route 157
1.000 mi = 1.609 km; 1.000 km = 0.621 mi

== CR 585 Spur ==
County Route 585 Spur
- Location: Middle Township
- Length: 3.17 mi (5.10 km)

County Route 585 Spur was a highway running from Route 47 east to US 9/CR 585 in Middle Township, Cape May County. That designation was removed when CR 585 was truncated to Somers Point and is currently CR 618.
