= County Route 561 (New Jersey) =

County highway in New Jersey, U.S.

County Route 561
- CR 561 highlighted in red, CR 561 Alt. in blue, CR 561 Spur in cyan, CR 561 Bypass in dark purple, other former alignments in magenta

Route information
- Length: 50.95 mi (82.00 km)

Major junctions
- South end: US 9 in Galloway Township
- G.S. Parkway in Galloway Township; US 30 in Hammonton; Route 54 in Hammonton; Route 73 in Winslow Township; US 30 in Berlin; I-295 in Cherry Hill; Route 154 in Cherry Hill; Route 41 in Haddonfield; US 30 / US 130 in Collingswood
- North end: CR 537 in Camden

Location
- Country: United States
- State: New Jersey
- Counties: Atlantic, Camden

Highway system
- County routes in New Jersey; 500-series routes
← CR 560	→ CR 563

County Route 561 (CR 561) is a county highway in the U.S. state of New Jersey. The highway extends 50.95 miles (82.00 km) from New York Road (U.S. Route 9 or US 9) in Galloway Township to Federal Street (CR 537) in Camden. Though it is designated a north-south county route by the New Jersey Department of Transportation, it geographically goes northwest-southeast and is signed both north-south and east-west inconsistently.

== Route description ==
=== Atlantic County ===
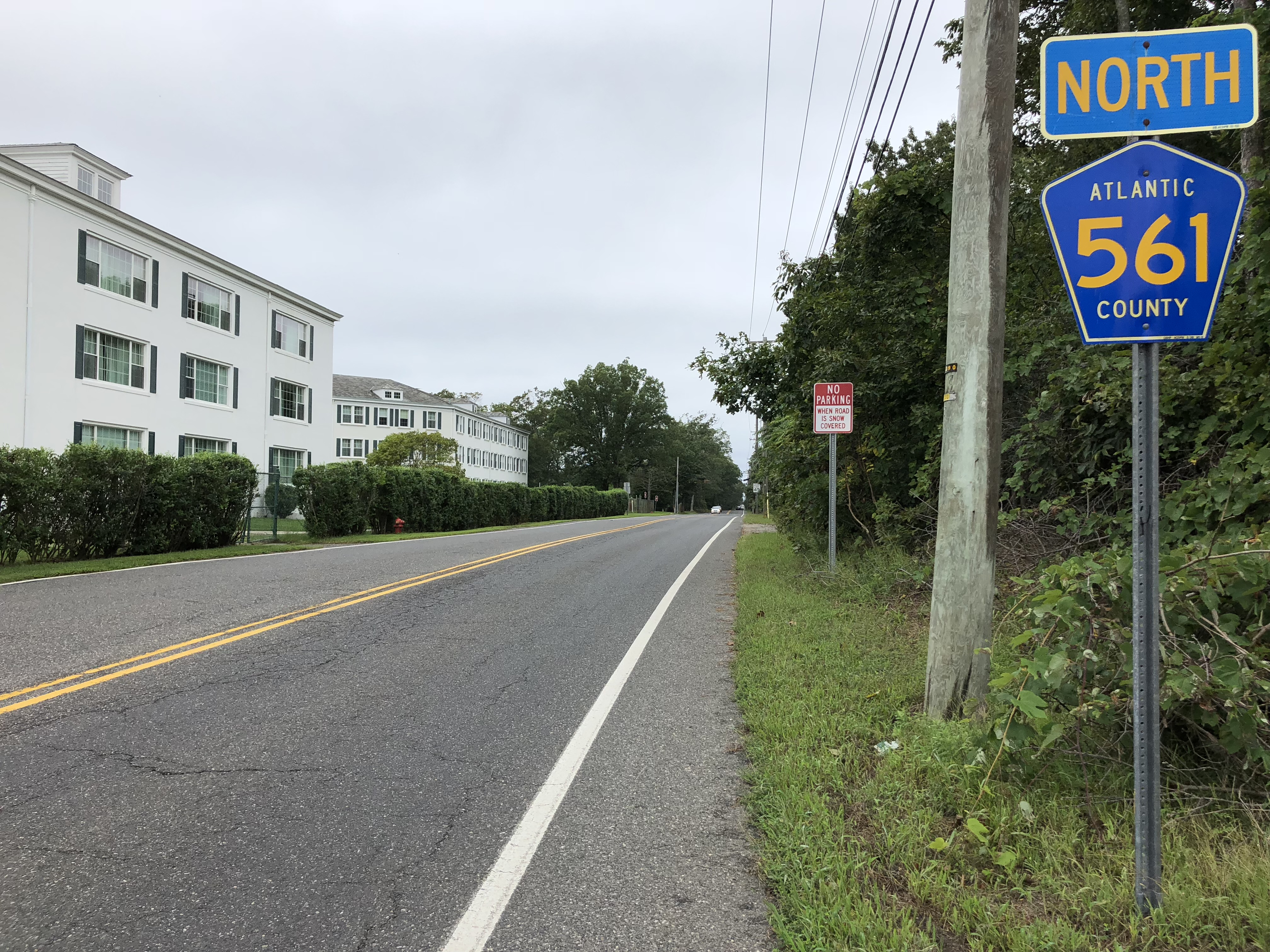
View north along CR 561 at US 9 in Galloway

CR 561 begins at an intersection with US 9 in Galloway Township, Atlantic County (near the Seaview Resort), heading northwest on two-lane undivided Jimmie Leeds Road. The road passes through densely forested areas with some homes, intersecting CR 634 and CR 654. The route turns more to the west and passes under the Garden State Parkway, with access to that road via Exit 41. CR 561 heads west into the community of Pomona, running between forests to the north and wooded residential and commercial development to the south and passing AtlantiCare Regional Medical Center Mainland Division. The route splits from Jimmie Leeds Road by turning northwest onto Duerer Street, with CR 633 continuing west along Jimmie Leeds Road. The road passes through dense forests and crosses CR 575 prior to running through a mix of farmland and woodland. CR 561 reaches the CR 614 junction and continues through more rural areas. After crossing CR 674, the route enters Egg Harbor City and passes through forested residential areas. CR 561 intersects CR 563 and heads into dense woodland, crossing into Mullica Township at the Hamburg Avenue junction.

The road runs through more forests with a few homes, coming to an intersection with CR 561 Alternate. At this point, CR 561 continues northwest along Moss Mill Road and runs through more woodland, passing a farm to the southwest to the road. The route crosses CR 658 and CR 623 as it runs northwest through dense forests for several miles, eventually entering Hammonton. In this area, CR 561 crosses US 30 and CR 640 as it becomes Egg Harbor Road and passes through woodland along with some homes, with the route following a brief one-way pair at the CR 602 junction. The road passes woods to the northeast and industrial establishments to the southwest prior to crossing a branch of Hammonton Lake and passing homes and businesses. CR 561 northbound forms a brief wrong-way concurrency with Route 54 as it crosses NJ Transit's Atlantic City Line in the commercial downtown area of Hammonton. The southbound direction of CR 561 crosses the tracks at Orchard Avenue and does not form a concurrency with Route 54. The route continues northwest on Egg Harbor Road and passes through residential areas, running immediately to the southwest of the Atlantic City Line. At the CR 678 junction, CR 561 heads farther from the railroad tracks into more rural areas of homes, intersecting the northern terminus of CR 559.

=== Camden County ===
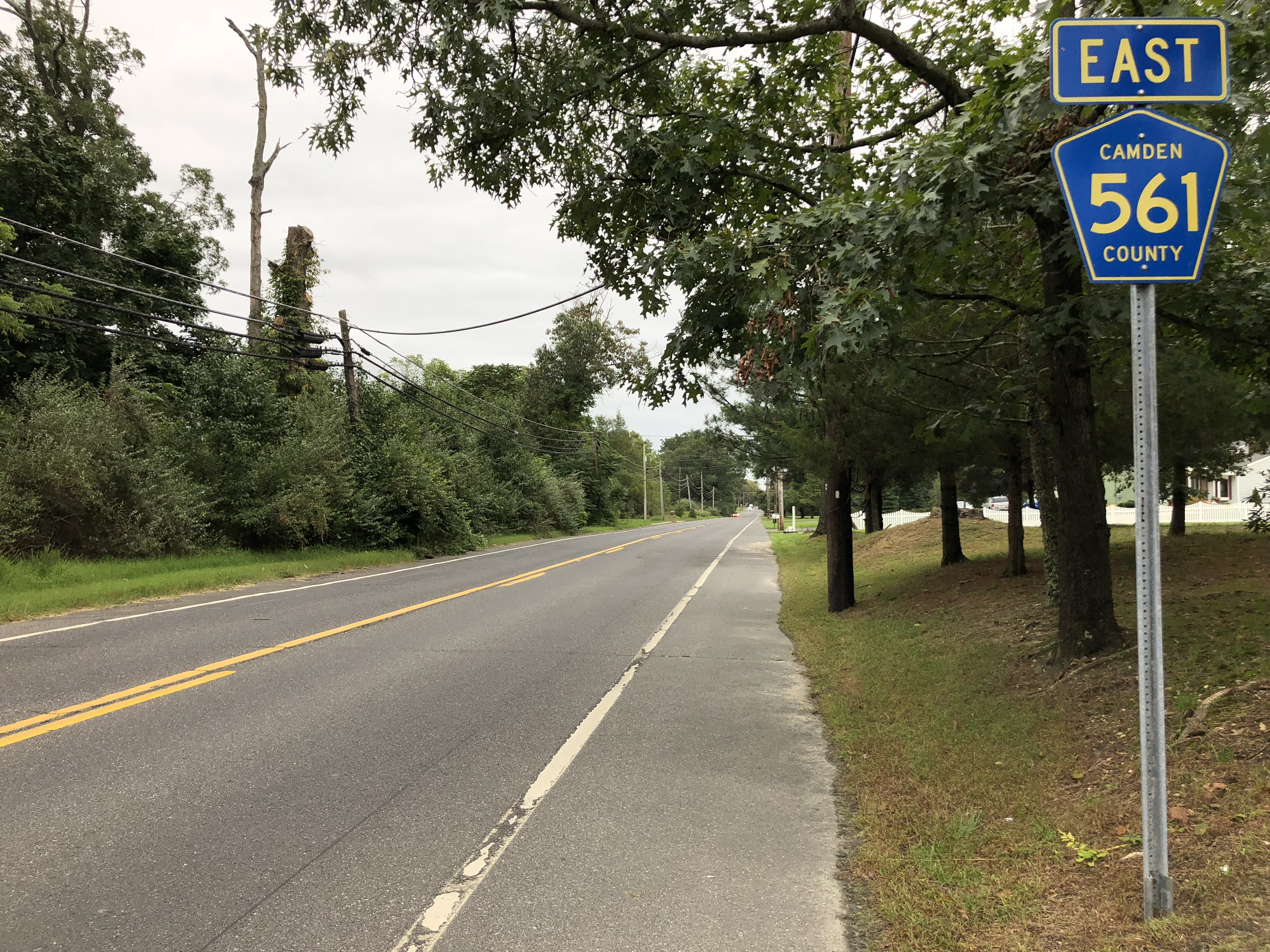
CR 561 eastbound past Route 143 and CR 726 in Winslow Township

CR 561 continues into Winslow Township in Camden County and becomes Cedarbrook Road as it heads into a mix of farmland, woodland, and homes. In an area of woods, the road crosses under the Beesleys Point Secondary railroad line operated by the Cape May Seashore Lines railroad before crossing over a Conrail Shared Assets Operations railroad line as it reaches the CR 725 junction. The route crosses the Southern Railroad of New Jersey's Southern Running Track line a short distance later and runs through more woodland as it crosses CR 723. CR 561 passes through wooded areas of homes as it intersects Route 143 and CR 726. The route runs through a mix of farms, woods, and development as it comes to the Route 73 junction. At this junction, CR 561 Spur meets the route and CR 561 forms a concurrency with four-lane Route 73. The road intersects CR 722 and CR 721, becoming Camden Road at the latter junction. It heads north through more rural areas, meeting CR 720. CR 561C, a former segment of CR 561, splits from Route 73 by heading north through the community of Cedar Brook while Route 73 and CR 561 bypass the community to the east, crossing under Conrail Shared Assets Operations' Beesleys Point Secondary railroad line. North of Cedar Brook, the route traverses CR 536, becoming Cedarbrook Road. It intersects CR 680 and CR 711 before widening into a divided highway prior to a junction where CR 712 heads northeast and CR 561 splits from Route 73 by heading north on two-lane Tansboro Road.

The road continues through a mix of farmland and woodland with some residences as it crosses CR 710 and CR 536 Spur. The route then enters Berlin, passing residences and a few businesses before intersecting CR 720 and US 30. At this point, CR 561 turns north to follow US 30 on the White Horse Pike, with CR 534 joining the road from the east. The road runs through the commercial center of Berlin, with CR 561 splitting from US 30/CR 534 by heading north onto Haddon Avenue and coming to a bridge over the Atlantic City Line. The road continues into Berlin Township and runs northwest past homes as well as some businesses, crossing CR 692. The route enters Voorhees Township and intersects CR 693 as it widens to four lanes and heads into more wooded areas of development, forming the border between Gibbsboro to the west and Voorhees Township to the east. CR 561D continues north on Haddon Avenue, with CR 561 becoming Haddonfield-Berlin Road as it fully enters Gibbsboro and bypasses the community through wooded areas to the northeast. Along this stretch, the route intersects CR 685 and CR 686. After heading back into Voorhees Township, the road comes to a junction with CR 561A and gains a center left-turn lane as it continues northwest into commercial areas, crossing CR 673. CR 561 passes through residential and business areas as a four-lane road, coming to an intersection with CR 544 and CR 678. At this intersection, the route enters Cherry Hill and passes near residential subdivisions before meeting CR 670 in commercial areas. The road passes over the New Jersey Turnpike and comes to an interchange with I-295 a short distance later.

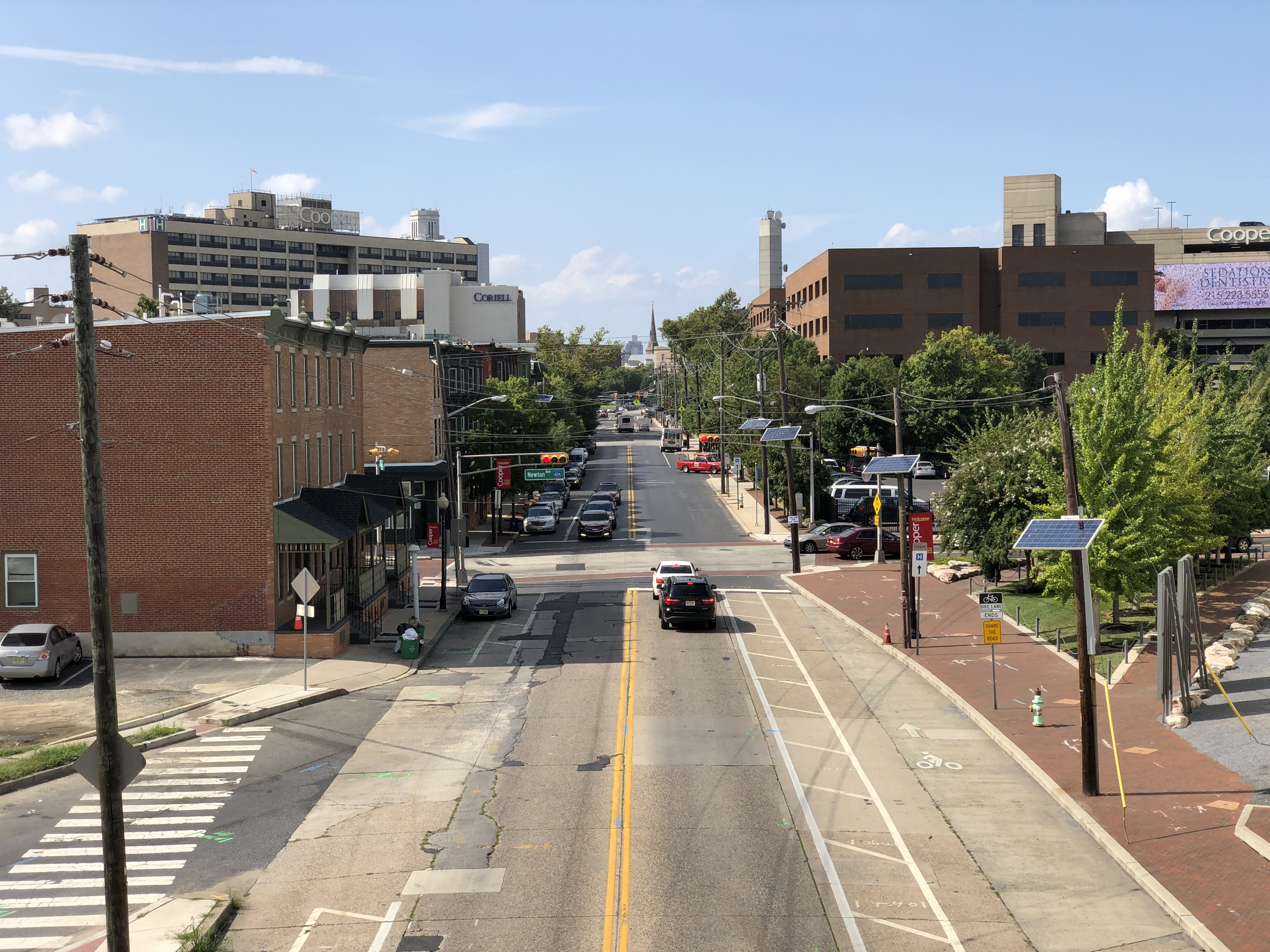
CR 561 northbound past I-676 in Camden

CR 561 runs near more homes before coming to the southern terminus of Route 154. The route passes a few commercial establishments before passing more residences and reaching the CR 671 junction. At this point, CR 561 continues into Haddonfield as two-lane Ellis Street, intersecting CR 644 before passing homes and making a turn northwest onto Haddon Avenue. The route crosses Route 41/CR 573 in the commercial downtown of Haddonfield prior to running through wooded neighborhoods. After passing over the Atlantic City Line, the road crosses into Haddon Township and passes through the commercial downtown of the Westmont part of the township, intersecting CR 642, CR 643 and TR 1152 (Cooper Street). At the CR 636 junction, CR 561 enters Collingswood and heads to the west through residential and business areas before coming to intersections with CR 640 and CR 630 in the commercial downtown. The route passes more homes, crossing CR 612 and coming to an interchange with US 30/US 130. At the CR 606 junction, the road heads into Camden and comes to CR 606 Alternate as it runs between urban industrial establishments to the southwest and Harleigh Cemetery to the northeast. The route passes Our Lady of Lourdes Medical Center along with rowhouses, crossing CR 607. CR 561 passes under the PATCO Speedline and Conrail Shared Assets Operations' Vineland Secondary railroad line prior to running under I-676 and coming into the commercial downtown of Camden and intersecting CR 604. The road passes Cooper University Hospital and crosses Martin Luther King Jr. Boulevard and NJ Transit's River Line as it turns north onto a six-lane divided highway. CR 561 reaches its northern terminus at an intersection with CR 537.

== History ==
North of Route 41, the road was created as part of the Haddonfield and Camden Turnpike, legislated in 1839.

== Major intersections ==
County	Location	mi	km	Destinations	Notes
Atlantic	Galloway Township	0.00	0.00	US 9 – Smithville, Manahawkin, Cape May	Southern terminus
Atlantic	Galloway Township	3.50– 3.58	5.63– 5.76	G.S. Parkway – Atlantic City, Toms River	GSP exit 41; interchange opened on March 13, 2015
Atlantic	Galloway Township	5.51	8.87	CR 575 (Mays Landing Port Republic Road)	Access to Atlantic City International Airport
Atlantic	Egg Harbor City	10.99	17.69	CR 563 (Philadelphia Avenue)	
Atlantic	Mullica Township	13.62	21.92	CR 561 Alt. south	Northern terminus of CR 561 Alt.
Atlantic	Hammonton	20.24	32.57	US 30 (White Horse Pike) – Atlantic City, Camden	
Atlantic	Hammonton	22.25– 22.27	35.81– 35.84	Route 54 (12th Street) – Buena, Vineland, Millville	Short concurrency on Route 54 while crossing the Atlantic City Line
Atlantic	Hammonton	23.85– 23.88	38.38– 38.43	CR 559 south (Chew Road) to Route 54 / A.C. Expressway – Mays Landing, Ocean City, Vineland	Northern terminus of CR 559
Camden	Winslow Township	26.17	42.12	Route 143 north (Spring Garden Road) – Ancora Hospital	Southern terminus of Route 143
Camden	Winslow Township	27.82	44.77	Route 73 / CR 561 Spur south to A.C. Expressway	South end of Route 73 overlap; northern terminus of CR 561 Spur
Camden	Winslow Township	30.41	48.94	CR 536 (Pump Branch Road)	
Camden	Winslow Township	32.48	52.27	Route 73 north	North end of Route 73 overlap
Camden	Winslow Township	34.28	55.17	CR 536 Spur (Taunton Road) to Route 73 north – Williamstown	
Camden	Berlin	35.78	57.58	US 30 east (White Horse Pike) – Hammonton	South end of US 30 overlap
Camden	Berlin	35.84	57.68	CR 534 east (Jackson Road) – Atco	South end of CR 534 overlap
Camden	Berlin	36.33	58.47	US 30 / CR 534 west (White Horse Pike) – Camden	North end of US 30/CR 534 overlap
Camden	Gibbsboro	38.94	62.67	CR 561D north (Berlin Road) / Eastwick Drive	
Camden	Voorhees Township	40.47	65.13	CR 561A south (Haddon Avenue) / Laurel Oak Road	
Camden	Voorhees–Cherry Hill township line	41.75	67.19	CR 544 (Evesham Road) / CR 678 (Somerdale Road)	
Camden	Cherry Hill	43.48– 43.67	69.97– 70.28	I-295	I-295 exit 32
Camden	Cherry Hill	44.34	71.36	Route 154 north (Brace Road)	Southern terminus of Route 154
Camden	Haddonfield	45.27	72.86	Route 41 / CR 573 (Kings Highway)	
Camden	Collingswood	48.71	78.39	US 30 / US 130 – Philadelphia, Trenton	Interchange
Camden	Camden	50.95	82.00	CR 537 east (Federal Street) / Haddon Street	Northern terminus, one-way street
1.000 mi = 1.609 km; 1.000 km = 0.621 mi: Concurrency terminus; Tolled

== Special routes ==
=== CR 561 Alternate ===
County Route 561 Alternate
- Location: Galloway Township – Mullica Township
- Length: 15.79 mi (25.41 km)

County Route 561 Alternate (CR 561 Alt.) is a county highway in the U.S. state of New Jersey. The highway, signed north and south, extends 15.79 miles (25.41 km) from a dead end on Moss Mill Road in Galloway Township to Duerer Street (CR 561) in Mullica Township.

Route description

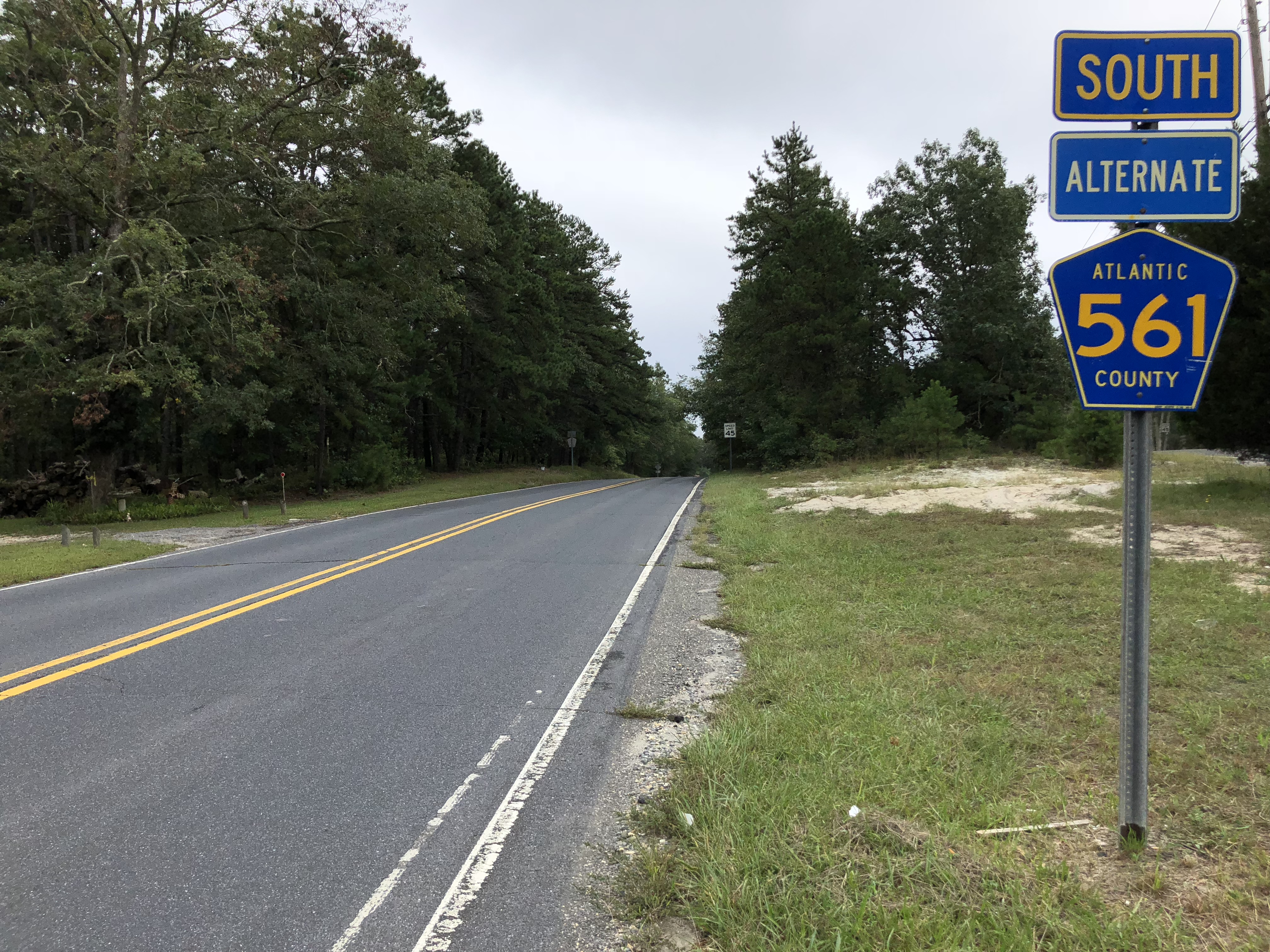
View south along CR 561 Alt at CR 561 in Mullica Township

CR 561 Alt. begins at a gravel road serving bungalows and a restaurant on Oyster Creek near the Great Bay in Galloway Township. The two-lane road, named Oyster Creek Road, travels southwest off the marshy wetlands area of the bay onto the mainland. The road turns to the west and becomes known as Moss Mill Road (a corruption of "Morse's Mill", named after an 18th-century settler) heading to the north of Leeds Point and passing homes and a church. At US 9, the road enters the census designated place of Smithville and its historic village center. Before reaching CR 561 Bypass (Smithville Boulevard), CR 561 Alt. passes a housing development and curves to the southwest and turns onto a two-lane divided road before narrowing to an undivided road and traveling in a westerly direction again. More forested areas begin to surround the road as the road crosses Pitney Road (CR 634) and then straddles the Galloway Township–Port Republic municipal line. CR 561 Alt. comes to a stop-controlled intersection with CR 575 (South Pomona Road) before the two roads travel southwest on a wrong-way concurrency. The two county routes have an interchange with the Garden State Parkway at its exit 44 before CR 561 Alt. resumes an independent routing along Moss Mill Road past the interchange. The route heads west northwest through mostly forested areas with some houses and farms adjacent to the road. At Bremen Avenue (CR 674) CR 561 Alt. enters Egg Harbor City. In the city, CR 561 Alt. intersects CR 563 and the entrance to Cedar Creek High School before it enters Mullica Township at its intersection with Hamburg Avenue. CR 561 Alt. continues straight for another two miles (3.2 km) before it ends at CR 561 where it joins Moss Mill Road from sharp angle.

Major intersections

The entire route is in Atlantic County.

Location	mi	km	Destinations	Notes
Galloway Township	0.00	0.00	Dead end	Southern terminus
Galloway Township	2.68	4.31	US 9 (New York Road) – Absecon, Manahawkin	
Galloway Township	3.17	5.10	CR 561 Byp. south (Smithville Boulevard) – Oceanville	Northern terminus of CR 561 Byp.
Galloway Township–Port Republic line	6.04	9.72	CR 575 north (Port Republic Road) – Port Republic	South end of CR 575 overlap
Galloway Township	6.24– 6.54	10.04– 10.53	G.S. Parkway	GSP exit 44, southbound entrance and northbound exit opened in August 2015
Galloway Township	6.58	10.59	CR 575 south	North end of CR 575 overlap
Egg Harbor City	13.13	21.13	CR 563 (Green Bank Road)	
Mullica Township	15.79	25.41	CR 561 (Duerer Street / Moss Mill Road)	Northern terminus
1.000 mi = 1.609 km; 1.000 km = 0.621 mi: Concurrency terminus; Tolled

=== CR 561 Bypass ===
County Route 561 Bypass
- Location: Smithville
- Length: 0.68 mi (1,090 m)

County Route 561 Bypass (CR 561 Byp.) is a county-maintained divided roadway running along Smithville Boulevard around the south side of Smithville in Galloway Township. It runs between US 9 and CR 561 Alt. for a total length of 0.68 miles (1.09 km).

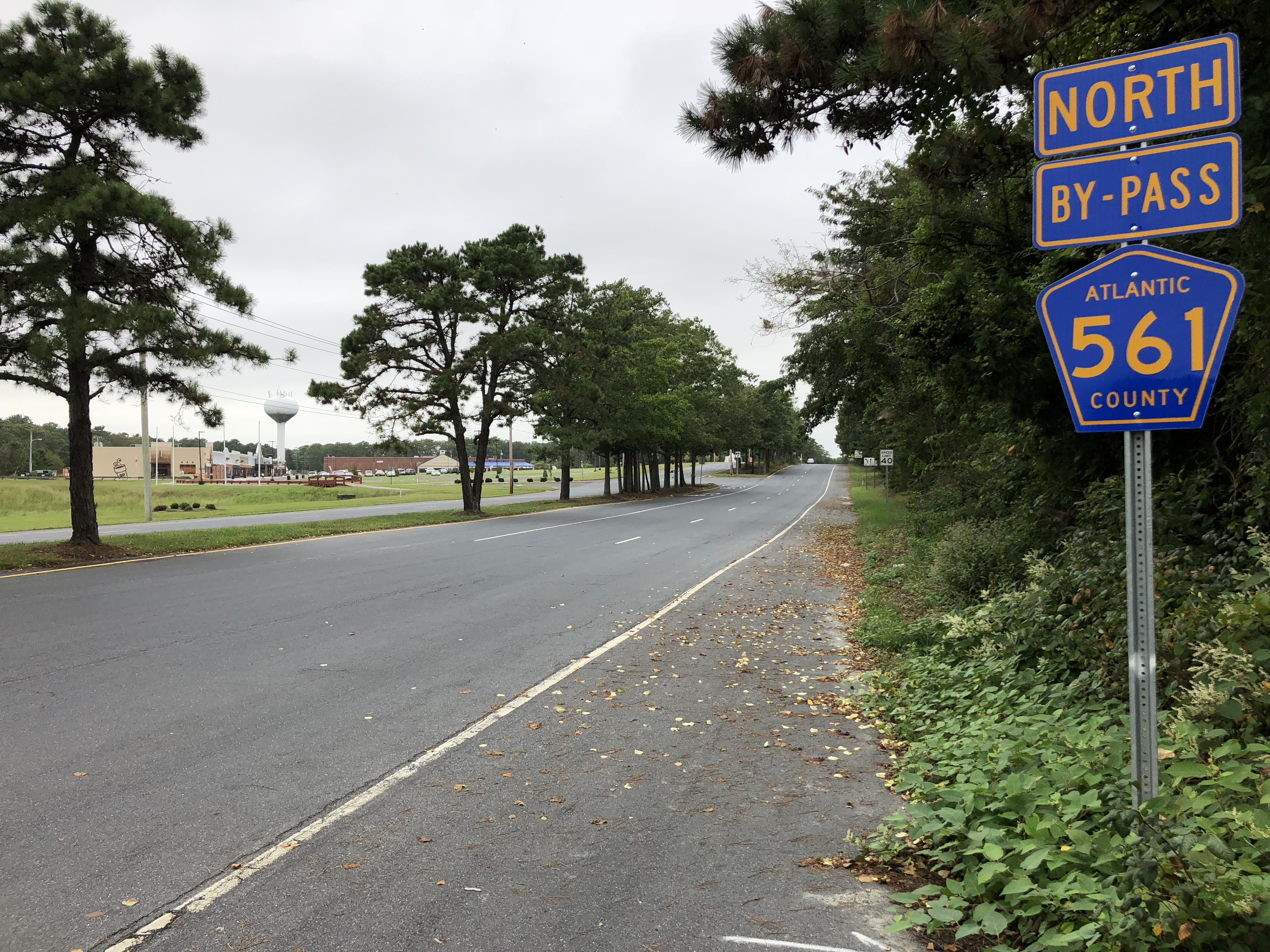
View north along CR 561 Bypass, a bypass of CR 561 Alt, at US 9 in Galloway Township

The roadway begins as a four-lane divided road (two lanes in each direction) at US 9 heading northwest passing by a small shopping center. At Quail Hill Road, the road narrows to one lane in each direction where CR 561 Byp. passes between two housing developments. It briefly curves to the north where access roads to the developments intersect CR 561 Byp. before it curves back towards the west and comes to an end at CR 561 Alt. (Moss Mill Road).

=== CR 561 Spur ===
County Route 561 Spur
- Location: Folsom–Winslow Township
- Length: 8.50 mi (13.68 km)

County Route 561 Spur (CR 561 Spur) is a 8.5-mile-long (13.7 km) section of New Jersey Route 73 between US 322 in Folsom, Atlantic County and CR 561 in Winslow Township, Camden County. The road south of the Atlantic City Expressway is maintained by Atlantic and Camden counties and is signed as CR 561 Spur (with some signage for Route 73) whereas the portion north of the Expressway is state-maintained and only signed as Route 73.

=== Former alignments ===
Four other former alignments of CR 561 that are continued to be maintained by Camden County exist- one in Cedar Brook and three in the Gibbsboro area.

The Cedar Brook section, designated by the New Jersey Department of Transportation (NJDOT) as CR 561-3 is a 0.55-mile-long (0.89 km) section of South Cedarbrook Road between Route 73 / CR 561 and CR 536, entirely within Winslow Township. The road is entirely two-lanes wide except near its southern end where it becomes one-way southbound as it merges onto Route 73 southbound.

Around Gibbsboro, three sections of former CR 561 are designated by NJDOT. The first, CR 561-1, runs from CR 561 in Voorhees Township south along Haddon Avenue. At the Voorhees Township–Gibbsboro municipal line, the road changes from Camden County maintenance to Gibbsboro maintenance. This segment ends at Clementon Road (CR 686). The second, CR 561-2 and signed on one traffic signal street sign as CR 561B, carries the county-maintained Foster Avenue between Clementon Road/CR 686 to United States Avenue (CR 699), entirely in Gibbsboro. The final segment, CR 561-4 and signed on one street sign as CR 561D, is a county-maintained section of Berlin Road from United States Avenue/CR 699 to a dead end just shy of CR 561 in Gibbsboro. Access to CR 561 is provided via Eastwick Drive just before the cul-de-sac end of the road.
