= New Jersey Route 52 =

State highway in New Jersey, US

Route 52
- Route 52 highlighted in red

Route information
- Maintained by NJDOT
- Length: 2.74 mi (4.41 km)
- Existed: June 1, 1937–present

Major junctions
- South end: 9th Street in Ocean City
- CR 559 / CR 585 in Somers Point
- North end: US 9 in Somers Point

Location
- Country: United States
- State: New Jersey
- Counties: Cape May, Atlantic

Highway system
- New Jersey State Highway Routes; Interstate; US; State; Scenic Byways
| ← Route 51 | → Route 53 |

Route 52 is a state highway in the southern part of the U.S. state of New Jersey. The highway runs 2.74 mi (4.41 km) from 9th Street in Ocean City, Cape May County north to U.S. Route 9 (US 9, New Road) in Somers Point, Atlantic County. It is composed mostly of a series of four-lane divided bridges forming a causeway across Great Egg Harbor Bay from Ocean City to Somers Point known as the Howard S. Stainton Memorial Causeway, also known as the 9th Street Bridge. The remainder of the route is a surface road called MacArthur Boulevard that runs from the causeway to US 9. This section of the route formerly included the Somers Point Circle, now a traffic light, where Route 52 intersects County Route 559 (CR 559) and CR 585.

Route 52 was originally designated on June 1, 1937 to run from the Somers Point Circle northwest to Mays Landing. This routing never came about and in 1953, Route 52 was designated onto its current alignment. CR 585 ran concurrent with the route south of the Somers Point Circle until 1971, when it was truncated to end at the Somers Point Circle. The circle was removed in 2010 as part of the bridge reconstruction. In 2006, construction began on the replacement of the Route 52 causeway that was built in the 1930s over the Great Egg Harbor Bay, beginning with guardrail repairs that reduced traffic to two lanes. In 2008, the northbound lanes of the causeway were opened to traffic. Construction on the southbound lanes was completed in late 2009. The entire project was completed in 2012, including other improvements such as the construction of fishing piers, boat ramps, bike paths, walking trails, gateways, and a new Ocean City Visitor Center. In addition, improvements were made to MacArthur Boulevard that included the addition of a center left-turn lane and the replacement of the Somers Point Circle with a traffic light.

== Route description ==
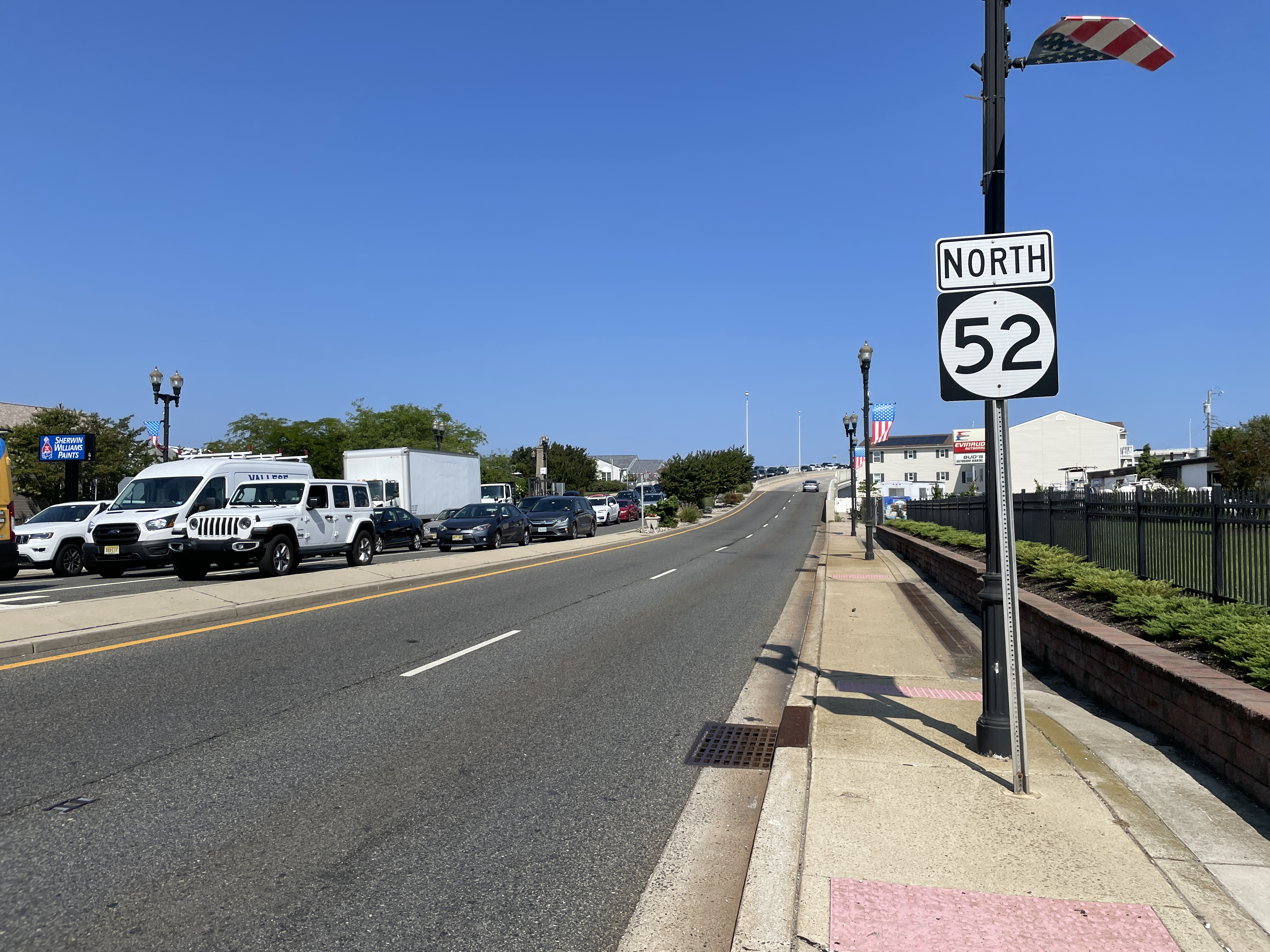
View north at the south end of Route 52 in Ocean City

Route 52 is a New Jersey state highway that runs for 2.74 miles (4.41 km) from the island resort city of Ocean City, New Jersey along the Jersey Shore to the mainland town of Somers Point. It is part of a continuous roadway, which also includes two local roads, travelling from the Ocean City Boardwalk along the Atlantic Ocean to the Garden State Parkway in Somers Point. The road begins as 9th Street, a 0.67-mile (1.08 km) east–west collector and arterial road, which transverses the city. Designation for Route 52 starts along 9th Street near the western shore of the island, at a point 0.09 miles (0.14 km) west of its intersection with CR 656 (Bay Avenue). The route begins as the Howard S. Stainton Memorial Causeway (also known as the 9th Street Bridge or the Route 52 Causeway), a four-lane divided highway and causeway, which runs for 2.03 miles (3.27 km), crossing four channels of Great Egg Harbor Bay with three interim salt marsh islands. The first crossing is the Intracoastal Waterway, followed by an island housing an Ocean City welcome center and a fishing pier, which are accessible via ramps in the southbound direction. The highway continues across Rainbow Channel and onto Rainbow Island, where an intersection leads to a parallel service road serving two additional fishing piers. After crossing Elbow Thoroughfare and a ship channel, Route 52 enters Somers Point, and comes to an intersection, formerly a traffic circle, with CR 559 (Mays Landing Road) and CR 585 (Shore Road). The route continues as MacArthur Boulevard, a 0.63-mile (1.01 km) arterial road with a center left-turn lane, which transitions into a median as it approaches its terminus at an intersection with US 9 (New Road). The road continues past the intersection to the northwest as West Laurel Drive for 0.65 miles (1.05 km), which travels through a residential neighborhood before terminating at a partial interchange with the Garden State Parkway.

The entirety of Route 52 is maintained by the New Jersey Department of Transportation and is part of the National Highway System (NHS); West Laurel Drive and the westernmost 0.38 miles (0.61 km) of 9th Street are also part of the NHS network.

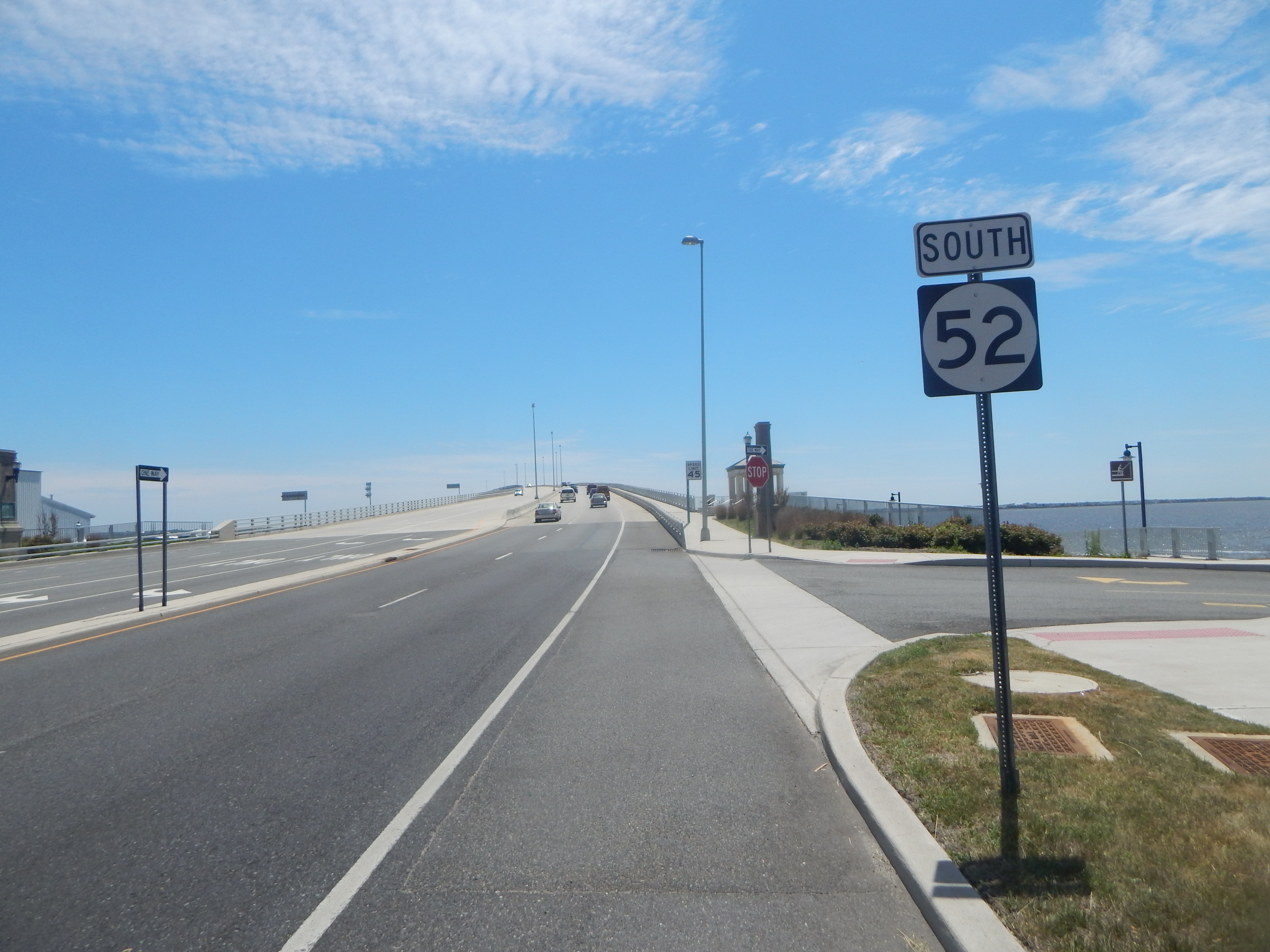
Route 52 southbound in Somers Point, approaching the causeway into Ocean City

== History ==
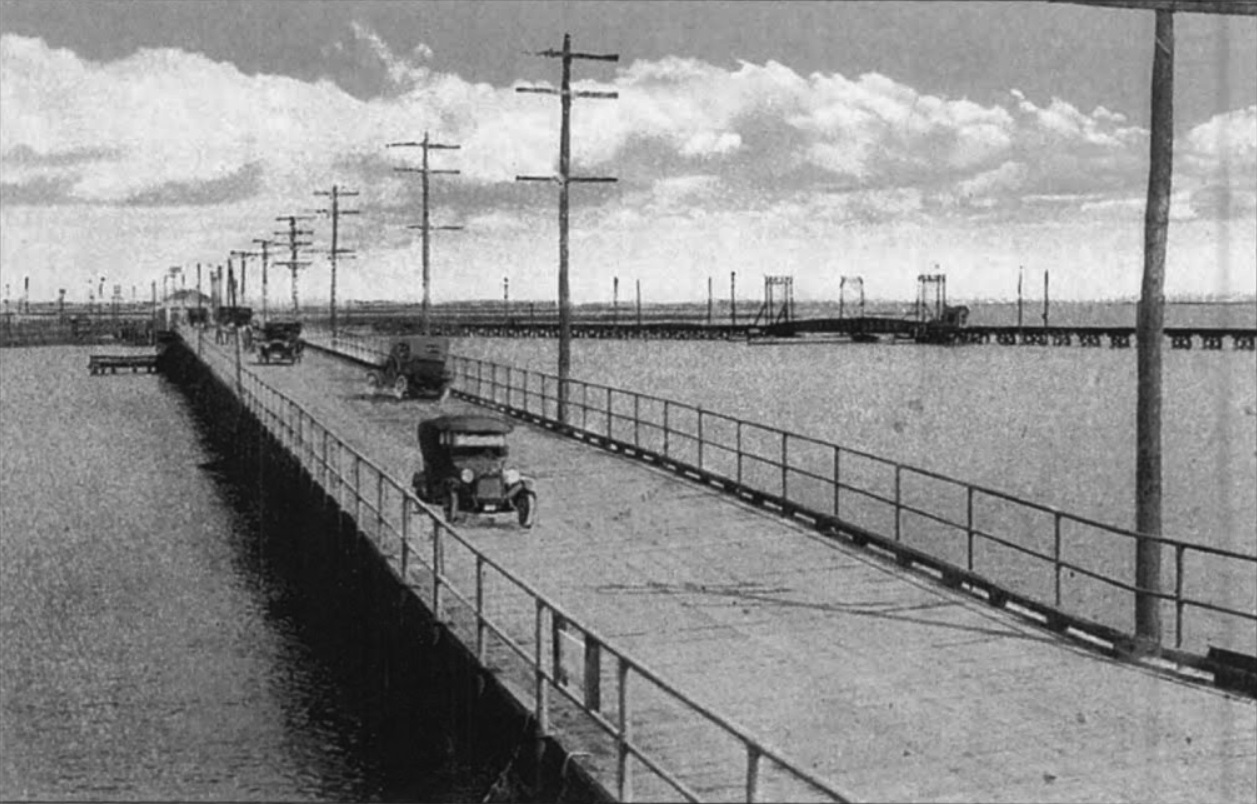
The original causeway between Ocean City and Somers Point opened in 1914.

Prior to 1914, access to the island resort city of Ocean City was only available by horse and buggy, ferry, or train. With the growing usage of the automobile, plans for a causeway to support automotive traffic were announced in 1912. The causeway opened on April 11, 1914 as the Somers Point Boulevard Bridge, connecting 9th Street in the northern part of Ocean City with the mainland town of Somers Point via a set of four bridges. It originally had a toll of 25 cents for the driver, plus 5 cents per passenger; the toll ended in 1922 when the causeway was sold to the State of New Jersey. The causeway was later replaced in 1933, with a new set of bridges that were four lanes wide without shoulders.

Route 52 was designated on June 1, 1937, to run from the Somers Point Circle northwest to Route 48 (now US 40) and Route 50 in Mays Landing. However, Route 52 was never built to run to Mays Landing. As part of the New Jersey state highway renumbering in 1953, Route 52 was designated to run from the Ocean City side of the causeway, north to US 9 in Somers Point. With the creation of the 500-series county routes in New Jersey in 1952, CR 585 was designated to run along Route 52 between the southern terminus and the Somers Point Circle as part of its route between Route 109 in Lower Township and US 30 and Route 157 in Absecon.

Eventually, the southern terminus of CR 585 was truncated to the Somers Point Circle.

In 1983, the causeway was officially named the Howard S. Stainton Memorial Causeway, after the Ocean City entrepreneur and philanthropist, who died in 1979.

The causeway underwent a minor renovation in 1988. This saw the operator room expanded, equipment replaced, and controls modernized.

On January 16, 2006, the New Jersey Department of Transportation reduced traffic on the bridges from four lanes to two lanes to limit the weight on the old structures. The highway was reopened to four lanes of traffic after guardrail repairs were made on May 17, 2006, with a new speed limit of 35 mph (56 km/h).

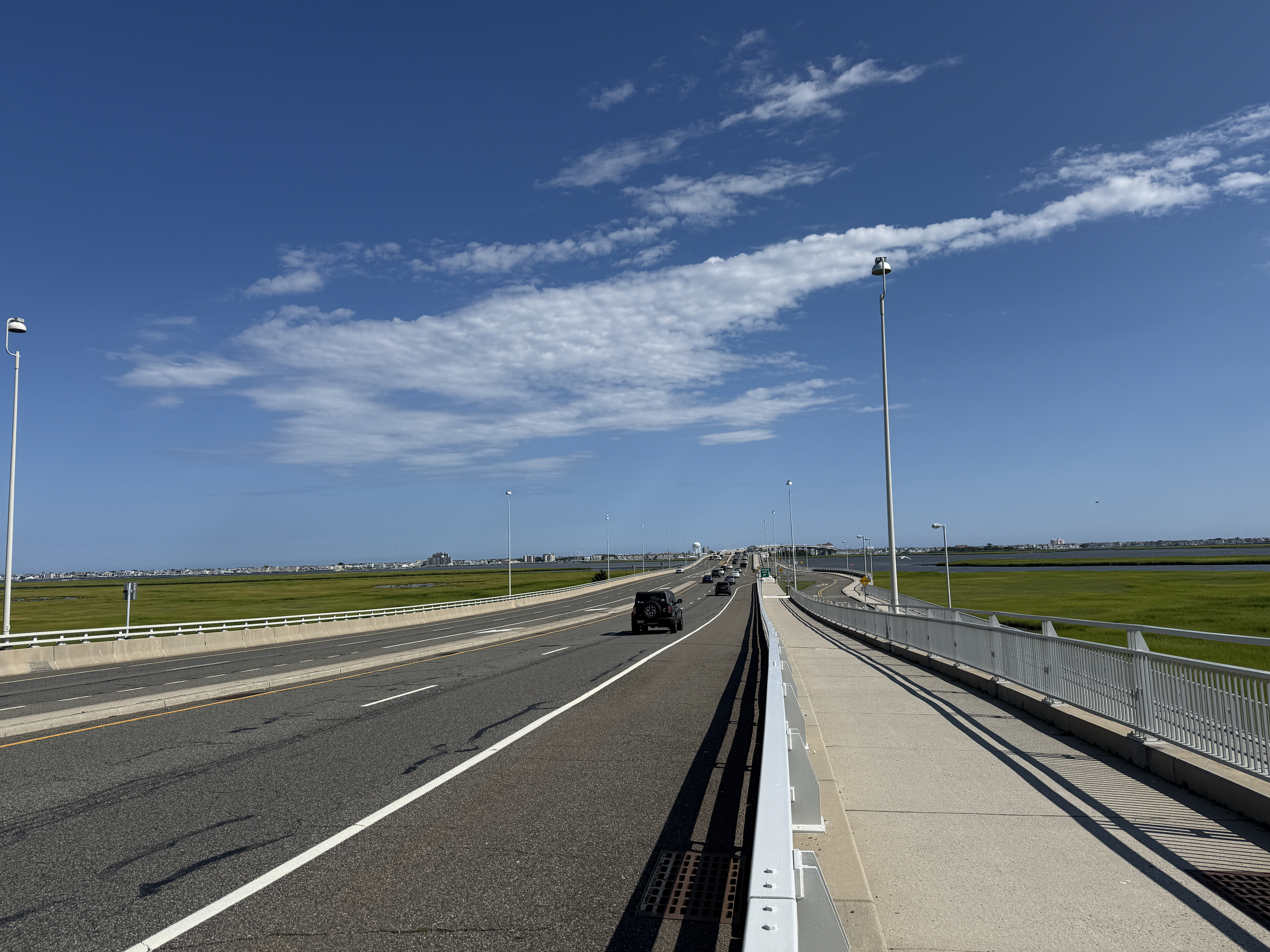
Route 52 southbound on the causeway between Somers Point and Ocean City

Between 2006 and 2012, a new $400 million causeway was built to replace the 1933 causeway over the Great Egg Harbor Bay. The original causeway was in need of replacement due to deteriorating conditions of the bridges, increasing automobile and marine traffic on the Great Egg Harbor Bay, flooding from storms, and a high accident rate due to narrow lanes and a lack of shoulders. The causeway also contained two drawbridges, which led to traffic jams during the summer months. After years of delays, construction began on the new bridge in September 2006. Crews began the project by clearing a staging area on Garrets Island near the Ocean City side. The northbound bridge was completed in April 2008 and the southbound bridge was completed in April 2009. During the bridge construction, excavated sand was removed from the bay and deposited onto Malibu Beach Wildlife Management Area, as part of environmental mitigation. In May 2012, construction of the causeway was completed, with all four lanes opened to traffic.

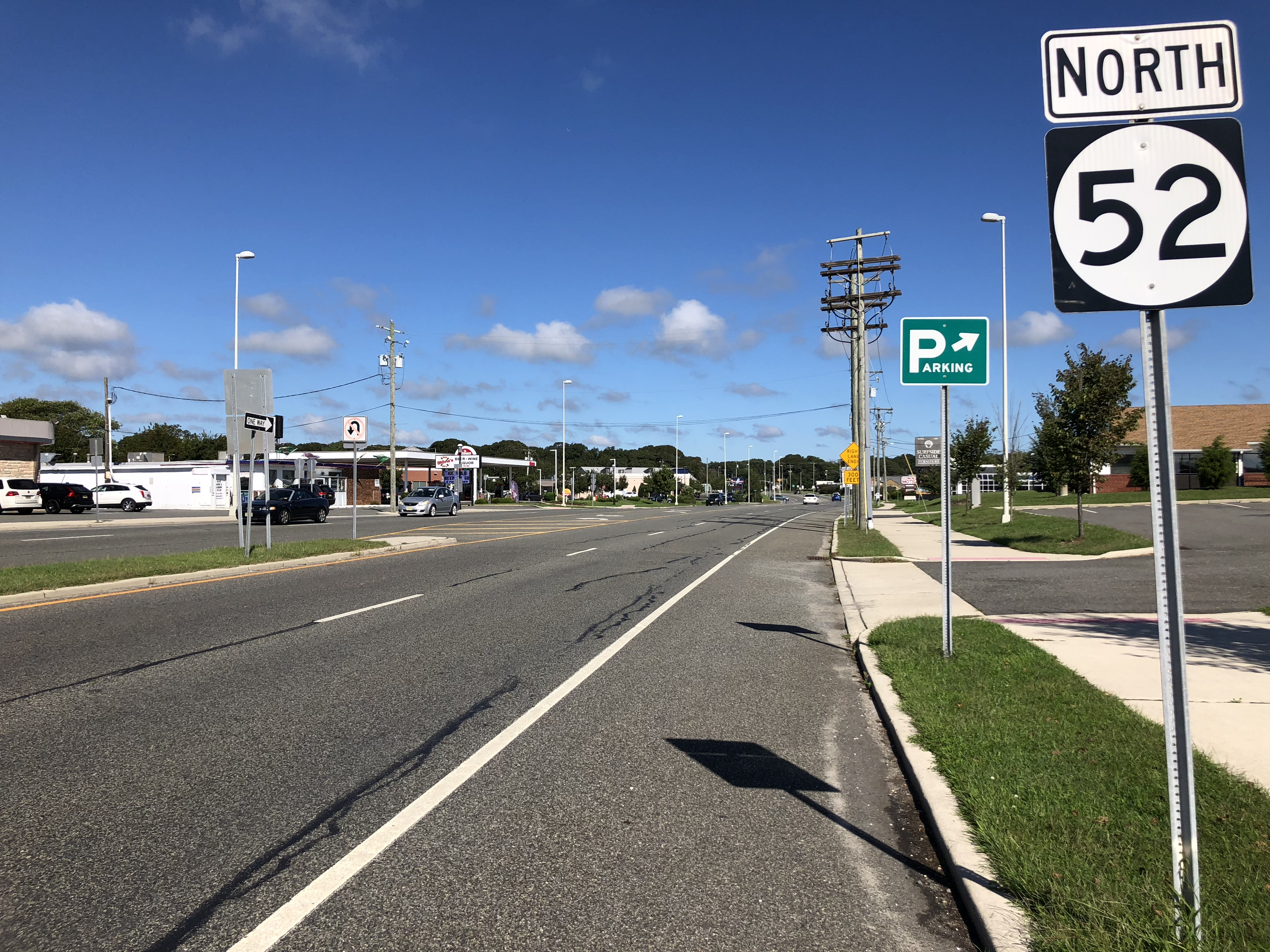
Route 52 northbound past CR 559 and CR 585 in Somers Point

In addition to the new causeway, the project also called for the construction of fishing piers, boat ramps, bike paths, walking trails, and gateways at each end of the causeway, including a new visitor center with a scenic overlook on the Ocean City side. Also, other improvements were made to the MacArthur Boulevard portion of Route 52 including the addition of a center left-turn lane and the replacement of the Somers Point Circle with a traffic light, which was eliminated in October 2010. As a result of the American Recovery and Reinvestment Act of 2009 signed into law by President Barack Obama on February 17, 2009, $70 million, or about 8 percent of the money allocated to New Jersey in the bill, went to the construction of the second half of the Route 52 causeway project.

From 2012 to 2014, annual average daily traffic (AADT) on the causeway went from 18,584 to 22,116, an increase of 19 percent. The latest AADT of the MacArthur Boulevard section, from 2012, is 11,540.

On July 19, 2021, a pilot made an emergency landing on the bridge after encountering engine problems shortly after takeoff; the plane was undamaged, and traffic was briefly halted.

== Major intersections ==
| County | Location | mi | km | Destinations | Notes |
|---|---|---|---|---|---|
| Cape May | Ocean City | 0.00 | 0.00 | 9th Street | Southern terminus; continues as 9th Street |
| Great Egg Harbor Bay | | 0.00– 2.03 | 0.00– 3.27 | Howard S. Stainton Memorial Causeway | |
| Atlantic | Somers Point | 2.11 | 3.40 | CR 559 north (Mays Landing Road) / CR 585 north (Shore Road) – Mays Landing, Atlantic City, Pleasantville | Former Somers Point Circle; southern termini of CR 559 and CR 585 |
| Atlantic | Somers Point | 2.74 | 4.41 | US 9 (New Road) to G.S. Parkway south | Northern terminus |
| Atlantic | Somers Point | 2.74 | 4.41 | Laurel Drive to G.S. Parkway north / A.C. Expressway | Continuation past terminus |
1.000 mi = 1.609 km; 1.000 km = 0.621 mi

== See also ==
- New Jersey Route 152 - Nearby state highway connecting barrier islands with the mainland
