= County Route 563 (New Jersey) =

County highway in New Jersey, U.S.

County Route 563
- CR 563 highlighted in red

Route information
- Maintained by NJDOT, Atlantic and Burlington counties, and Ole Hansen & Sons, Inc.
- Length: 43.87 mi (70.60 km)
- Existed: 1952–present
- Tourist routes: Pine Barrens Byway

Major junctions
- South end: CR 629 in Margate City
- US 9 in Northfield; G.S. Parkway in Egg Harbor Township; US 40 / US 322 in Egg Harbor Township; US 30 in Galloway Township; US 30 / Route 50 in Egg Harbor City
- North end: Route 72 in Woodland Township

Location
- Country: United States
- State: New Jersey
- Counties: Atlantic, Burlington

Highway system
- County routes in New Jersey; 500-series routes
← CR 561	→ CR 565

County Route 563 (CR 563) is a county highway in the U.S. state of New Jersey. The highway extends 43.87 miles (70.60 km) from CR 629 (Ventnor Avenue) in Margate City, Atlantic County north to Route 72 in Woodland Township, Burlington County. In Atlantic County, the road runs through a mix of suburban and rural areas, passing through Northfield, Egg Harbor Township, and Egg Harbor City. North of Egg Harbor City into Burlington County, CR 563 runs through the heavily forested Pine Barrens. Between Margate and Northfield, CR 563 runs along the Downbeach Express, a toll bridge that is maintained by Ole Hansen & Sons, Inc.

The Margate Bridge was built in 1929 by Ole Hansen and privately maintained until being taken over by the Margate Bridge Company in 1963. It was renamed to the Downbeach Express in 2012. The portion of present-day CR 563 between U.S. Route 9 (US 9) and US 30 was legislated as a state highway called Route S43 in 1938, a spur of Route 43 (US 30). This was never built as a state highway, although it was renumbered Route 89 in the 1953 renumbering. By 1946, all of current CR 563 had been built as a paved road. The CR 563 designation was assigned in 1952 with the creation of the 500-series county routes in New Jersey.

The Cardiff Circle at the north end of the US 40/US 322 concurrency in Egg Harbor Township was eliminated in 2002, while the Airport Circle at CR 646 near the Atlantic City International Airport underwent alterations in 2011 allowing Delilah Road motorists to pass straight through the circle, and future plans call for new ramps to pass over the circle as part of a project to connect the airport directly to the Atlantic City Expressway.

== Route description ==
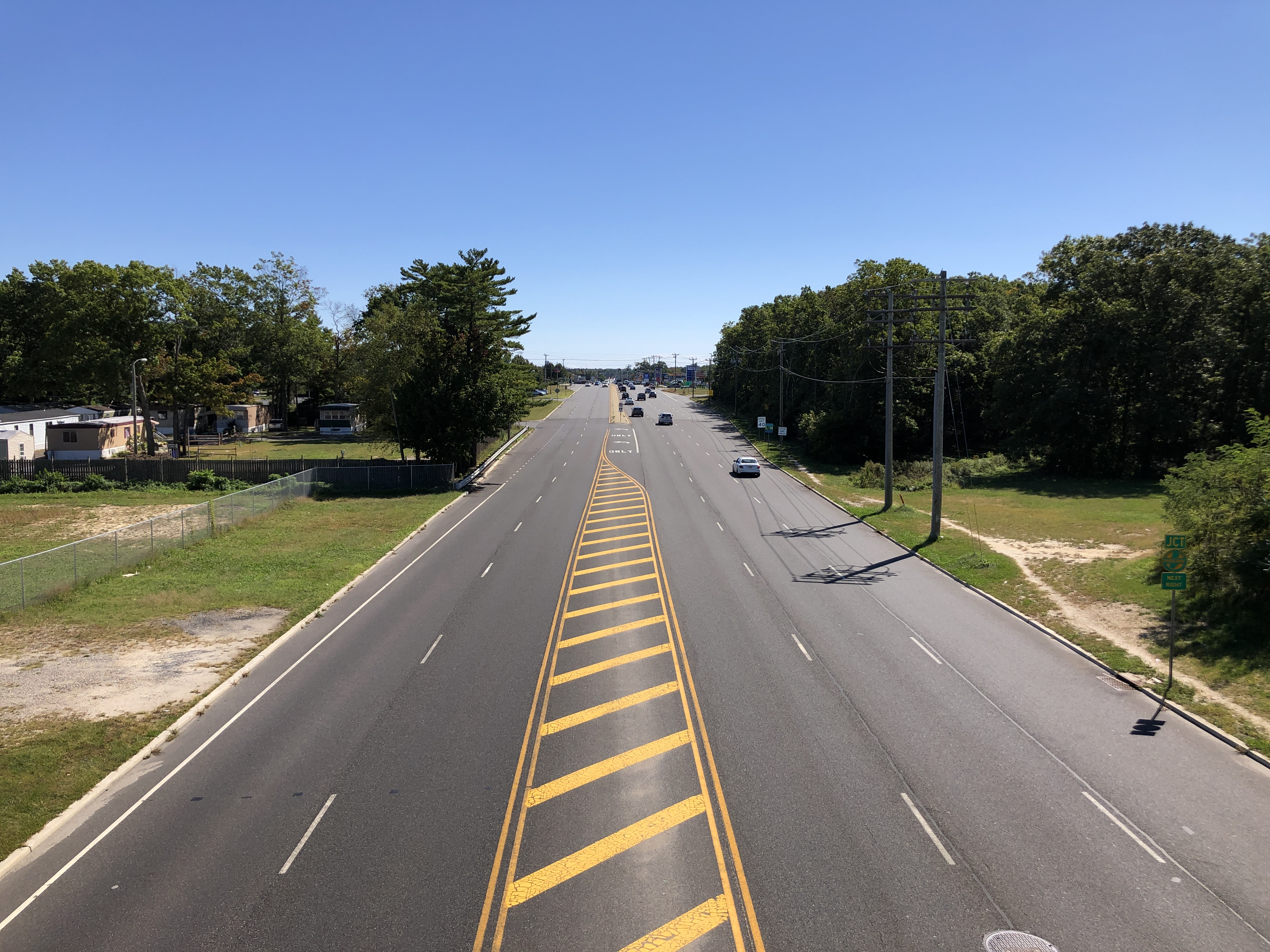
CR 563 southbound past the Garden State Parkway in Egg Harbor Township

CR 563 begins at an intersection with CR 629 in Margate City, Atlantic County, heading to the northwest on Jerome Avenue, a five-lane road with a center left-turn lane. The road continues through residential areas of Margate City before it comes to the toll plaza for the Downbeach Express, formerly known as the Margate Bridge and Causeway. This span, which stretches from Margate City to Northfield, is maintained by Ole Hansen & Sons, Inc., and tolls can be paid with cash or the Downbeach Express Pass, an automated toll collection system. E-ZPass is not accepted on the Downbeach Express. The toll for cars is $2.00 using cash and $1.40 using the Downbeach Express Pass. At this point, CR 563 narrows into a two-lane undivided road and turns west, entering Egg Harbor Township upon crossing the Beach Thorofare on a drawbridge. The road turns northwest into wetlands, crossing over several waterways. After passing a marina, the route runs through more wetlands before entering Northfield. Here, CR 563 becomes Mill Road and passes homes prior to a five-way intersection with CR 585 and CR 662. At this intersection, CR 563 turns north onto Tilton Road and runs through residential and commercial areas, heading across the Somers Point Bike Path. Upon crossing US 9, the route widens back to a five-lane road with a center left-turn lane and is lined with several businesses. The road crosses back into Egg Harbor Township, becoming a six-lane divided highway as it crosses CR 651 and has a ramp from the southbound direction to the Garden State Parkway. CR 563 becomes a four-lane undivided road as it crosses under the Garden State Parkway and comes to a ramp from the southbound Garden State Parkway to southbound CR 563. A short distance later, it comes to an intersection with US 40/US 322 (Black Horse Pike), where CR 563 makes a left turn to form a concurrency with that road.

Along the Black Horse Pike, the road continues north and passes to the east of the Harbor Square shopping center. CR 563 splits from US 40/US 322 by continuing north-northwest on Tilton Road, which is three lanes wide including a center left-turn lane. It runs through wooded areas of development as it crosses over the Atlantic City Expressway without an interchange. CR 563 intersects CR 646 and Amelia Earhart Boulevard, an access road to the Atlantic City International Airport, at the former Airport Circle. Following the circle, the route narrows into a two-lane road as it passes through forests prior to running to the west of the Atlantic City International Airport. The road continues into Hamilton Township, where it has an intersection with CR 575. After this intersection, CR 563 enters wooded surroundings and crosses into Galloway Township. In this area, the road crosses over NJ Transit’s Atlantic City Line prior to an intersection with US 30 (White Horse Pike).

CR 563 heads northwest to form a concurrency with the four-lane undivided US 30, passing through the community of Cologne, where it crosses CR 614. The road continues through rural areas with some development before entering Egg Harbor City at the CR 674 junction. In Egg Harbor City, the road passes homes and businesses before coming to the northern terminus of Route 50 in the center of town. At this intersection, CR 563 splits from US 30 by heading northeast on two-lane undivided Philadelphia Avenue, which continues south as Route 50. The road passes through the downtown area before entering areas of homes. After crossing CR 561, the development along CR 563 decreases as it heads into heavily forested areas of the Pine Barrens and comes to a crossroads with CR 561 Alternate. Upon crossing Egg Harbor City Lake, CR 563 becomes Park Avenue West, Buffalo Avenue, and Egg Harbor-Green Bank Road. The road makes a turn to the north and crosses into Mullica Township. In Mullica Township, the route enters the residential community of Weekstown, where it curves west before heading north at the CR 643 junction. Upon leaving Weekstown, CR 563 turns northeast back into the Pine Barrens.

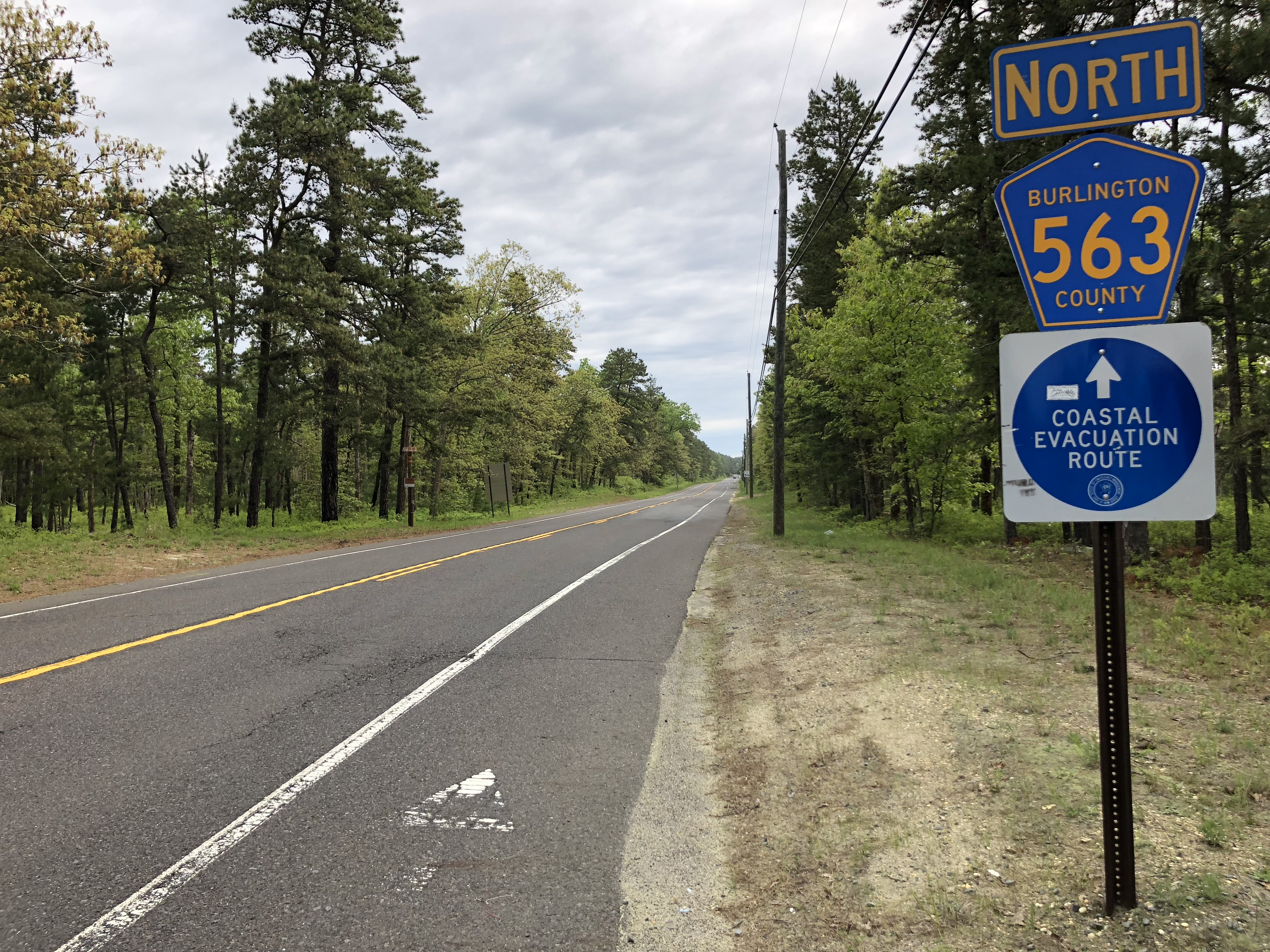
View north along CR 563 at CR 679 in Washington Township, Burlington County

After crossing the Mullica River on a drawbridge, CR 563 enters Washington Township in Burlington County, where it becomes Chatsworth-Harrisville-New Gretna Road and continues northeast past homes. After heading east for a brief concurrency with CR 542, the route heads north into the Wharton State Forest, passing through rural areas for several miles. CR 563 intersects CR 679 before passing a few areas of homes. The road runs through more forests before heading into an area of cranberry bogs. CR 563 leaves the Wharton State Forest and enters Woodland Township, still in the Pine Barrens. In Woodland Township, the route comes to the residential community of Chatsworth. In the center of the community, CR 563 has a concurrency with CR 532 that crosses an abandoned railroad line. After running through Chatsworth, CR 563 passes through more forests before coming to its northern terminus at Route 72.

== History ==
Route S43 (planned in 1938)

What is now CR 563 between Egg Harbor City and Green Bank originally existed as an unnumbered and unpaved road by 1927.

The Margate Bridge and nearby road between Margate City and Northfield was built in 1929 by Ole Hansen and was privately maintained by F. W. Schwiers & Company

The Margate Bridge and nearby stretch of road were repaired and widened starting in 1938. Work was completed in 1939.

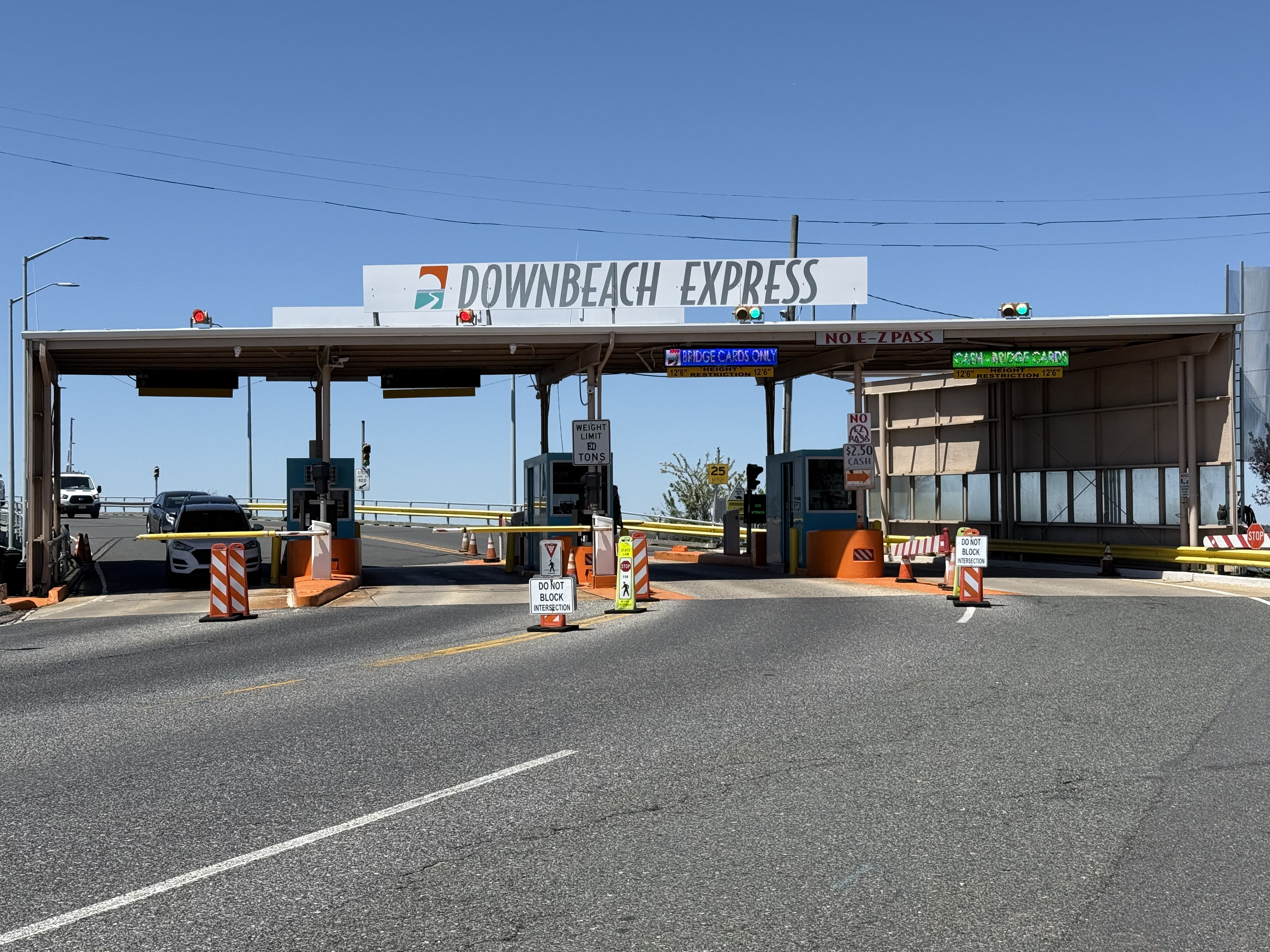
Toll plaza for the Downbeach Express

In 1938, a spur of Route 43 (US 30) called Route S43 was planned to follow the current alignment of CR 563 from Route 43 in Germania to Route 4 (now US 9) in Northfield; this road was never built as a state highway. By 1946, the entire current alignment of CR 563 was built as an unnumbered paved two-lane road.

When the 500-series county routes were established in New Jersey in 1952, CR 563 was designated onto its current alignment. A spur route, CR 563 Spur, was also designated, which ran from CR 563 in Washington Township east to US 9 in New Gretna in Burlington County.

This Margate Bridge was purchased in 1963 by the Margate Bridge Company, owned by the Hansen and Capaldi families, after the original owners went bankrupt.

CR 563 spur was replaced with CR 679 by the 1990s.

The Cardiff Circle at the north end of the US 40/US 322 concurrency in Egg Harbor Township was eliminated in a $3.7 million project completed in 2002.

In 2003, an automated toll collection system was introduced along the Margate Bridge and Causeway known as the Quick Toll Card, which used a prepaid automated toll card.

The Airport Circle at CR 646 was planned to be replaced with a regular roundabout due to a high accident rate at the current circle. The circle was removed in 2011, allowing CR 646 motorists to pass across through the circle, and future plans call for new ramps to pass over the circle as part of a project to connect the airport directly to the Atlantic City Expressway.

In 2012, the Margate Bridge and Causeway was renamed the Downbeach Express and a more efficient Downbeach Express Pass automated toll collection system was introduced.

== Major intersections ==
County	Location	mi	km	Destinations	Notes
Atlantic	Margate City	0.00	0.00	CR 629 (Ventnor Avenue)	Southern terminus
Atlantic	Beach Thorofare	0.90	1.45	Downbeach Express (toll; cash or Downbeach Express Pass)	
Atlantic	Northfield	3.73	6.00	CR 585 (Shore Road)	
Atlantic	Northfield	4.47	7.19	US 9 (New Road) – Somers Point, Ocean City, Cape May, Absecon	
Atlantic	Egg Harbor Township	6.12	9.85	G.S. Parkway	Southbound exit and entrance, GSP exit 36
Atlantic	Egg Harbor Township	6.27	10.09	US 40 east / US 322 east (Black Horse Pike) – Atlantic City	South end of US 40/US 322 overlap
Atlantic	Egg Harbor Township	6.90	11.10	US 40 west / US 322 west (Black Horse Pike) – Delaware Memorial Bridge, Philadelphia	North end of US 40/US 322 overlap
Atlantic	Hamilton Township	11.53	18.56	CR 575 (Wrangleboro Road) to A.C. Expressway	
Atlantic	Galloway Township	13.74	22.11	US 30 east (White Horse Pike)	South end of US 30 overlap
Atlantic	Egg Harbor City	16.70	26.88	US 30 west (White Horse Pike) Route 50 south (Philadelphia Avenue)	North end of US 30 overlap
Atlantic	Egg Harbor City	17.56	28.26	CR 561 (Duerer Street)	
Atlantic	Egg Harbor City	18.20	29.29	CR 561 Alt. (Moss Mill Road) – Hammonton, Smithville	
Burlington	Washington Township	24.73	39.80	CR 542 west (Hammonton Road)	South end of CR 542 overlap
Burlington	Washington Township	24.86	40.01	CR 542 east	North end of CR 542 overlap
Burlington	Woodland Township	39.98	64.34	CR 532 east	South end of CR 532 overlap
Burlington	Woodland Township	40.07	64.49	CR 532 west to US 206 – Tabernacle	North end of CR 532 overlap
Burlington	Woodland Township	43.87	70.60	Route 72 – Long Beach Island	Northern terminus
1.000 mi = 1.609 km; 1.000 km = 0.621 mi: Concurrency terminus; Incomplete access; Tolled
