= County Route 575 (New Jersey) =

County highway in New Jersey, U.S.

County Route 575
- CR 575 highlighted in red

Route information
- Length: 20.96 mi (33.73 km)
- Tourist routes: Pine Barrens Byway

Major junctions
- South end: CR 559 in Egg Harbor Township
- US 40 / US 322 in Egg Harbor Township; A.C. Expressway in Hamilton Township; CR 563 in Hamilton Township; US 30 in Galloway Township; CR 561 in Galloway Township; G.S. Parkway in Galloway Township
- North end: US 9 in Port Republic

Location
- Country: United States
- State: New Jersey
- Counties: Atlantic

Highway system
- County routes in New Jersey; 500-series routes
| ← CR 573 | → CR 577 |

County Route 575 (CR 575) is a county highway in the U.S. state of New Jersey. The highway extends 20.96 miles (33.73 km) from Somers Point-Mays Landing Road (CR 559) in Egg Harbor Township to New York Road (U.S. Route 9 or US 9) in Port Republic.

== Route description ==
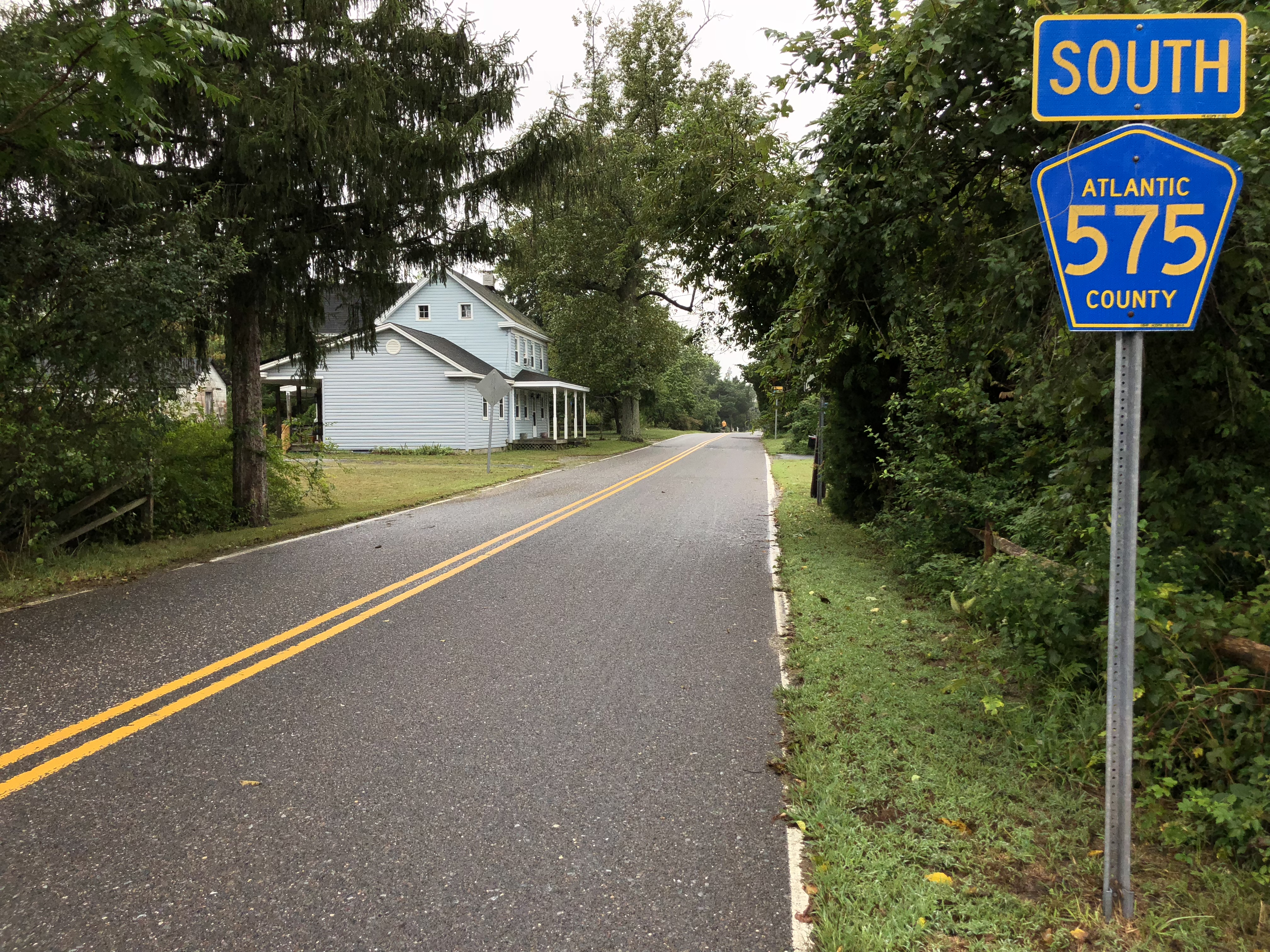
View south along CR 575 at CR 610 in Port Republic

CR 575 begins at an intersection with CR 559 in Egg Harbor Township, heading north on two-lane undivided English Creek Avenue. The road runs through a mix of woods and homes, crossing CR 615 as it turns more to the northeast and crosses CR 559 Alternate. Farther northeast, the route crosses the Atlantic County Bikeway. CR 575 continues to US 40/US 322 (Black Horse Pike), where it turns west to form a concurrency with that road. Here, English Creek Avenue continues north as CR 603. The Black Horse Pike, a four-lane divided highway, heads west through commercial areas, crossing into Hamilton Township and reaching the CR 646 junction. CR 575 splits from US 40/US 322 by heading northeast on Wrangleboro Road a short distance before the US 40/US 322 split.

Past this intersection, CR 575 is briefly a six-lane divided highway as it intersects a ramp to and from the eastbound Atlantic City Expressway and an access road to the Hamilton Mall. The road becomes a four-lane undivided road as it continues through commercial areas and runs southeast of the former Atlantic City Race Course. Upon reaching a partial interchange with access to and from the westbound direction of the Atlantic City Expressway, CR 575 becomes two lanes again and enters woodland. The road crosses CR 563 near the Atlantic City International Airport before coming into Galloway Township. Here, the route becomes Pomona Road and enters wooded residential areas within the community of Pomona, intersecting CR 686 and CR 605 before crossing NJ Transit’s Atlantic City Line. The route continues to an intersection with US 30 (White Horse Pike).

After US 30, CR 575 crosses CR 633 before leaving Pomona and meeting CR 561. The road continues through forested areas with some farms before passing near the campus of Stockton University. Past the college, the route forms a concurrency with CR 561 Alternate and reaches a complete interchange with the Garden State Parkway. This interchange provides access to and from the parkway. CR 561 Alternate and CR 575 split a short distance later, with CR 575 heading into Port Republic on English Creek-Port Republic Road, Pomona Avenue, and Main Street. The road continues through dense woodland before making a turn to the east and passing several homes. CR 575 intersects CR 610 and turns north onto Old New York Road, intersecting CR 624 a short distance later. Leaving the center of Port Republic, the road enters rural areas again and turns northeast at the CR 650 junction onto Chestnut Neck Road. The route parallels the Garden State Parkway to the south and passes a couple businesses. CR 575 comes to its northern terminus at an intersection with US 9.

== Major intersections ==
The entire route is in Atlantic County.

| Location | mi | km | Destinations | Notes |
|---|---|---|---|---|
| Egg Harbor Township | 0.00 | 0.00 | CR 559 (Somers Point Mays Landing Road) – Somers Point, Cape May, Mays Landing | Southern terminus |
| Egg Harbor Township | 3.36 | 5.41 | CR 559 Alt. (Ocean Heights Avenue) | |
| Egg Harbor Township | 6.75 | 10.86 | US 40 east / US 322 east (Black Horse Pike) – Atlantic City | South end of US 40/US 322 overlap |
| Hamilton Township | 8.67 | 13.95 | US 40 west / US 322 west (Black Horse Pike) – Mays Landing, Camden | North end of US 40/US 322 overlap |
| Hamilton Township | 9.33 | 15.02 | A.C. Expressway to G.S. Parkway – Atlantic City, Shore Points, Philadelphia, Camden | ACE exit 12 |
| Hamilton Township | 11.33 | 18.23 | CR 563 (Tilton Road) – Atlantic City International Airport | |
| Galloway Township | 12.62 | 20.31 | US 30 (White Horse Pike) – Hammonton, Atlantic City | |
| Galloway Township | 13.53 | 21.77 | CR 561 (Duerer Street) to G.S. Parkway | |
| Galloway Township | 16.01 | 25.77 | CR 561 Alt. north (Moss Mill Road) – Egg Harbor, Hammonton | South end of CR 561 Alt. overlap |
| Galloway Township | 16.16– 16.21 | 26.01– 26.09 | G.S. Parkway | GSP exit 44, southbound entrance and northbound exit opened in August 2015 |
| Port Republic | 16.55 | 26.63 | CR 561 Alt. south – Smithville, Leeds Point | North end of CR 561 Alt. overlap |
| Port Republic | 20.96 | 33.73 | US 9 – Manahawkin, Absecon | Northern terminus |
1.000 mi = 1.609 km; 1.000 km = 0.621 mi: Concurrency terminus; Tolled
