= Great Egg Harbor Bay =

Bay in New Jersey, United States

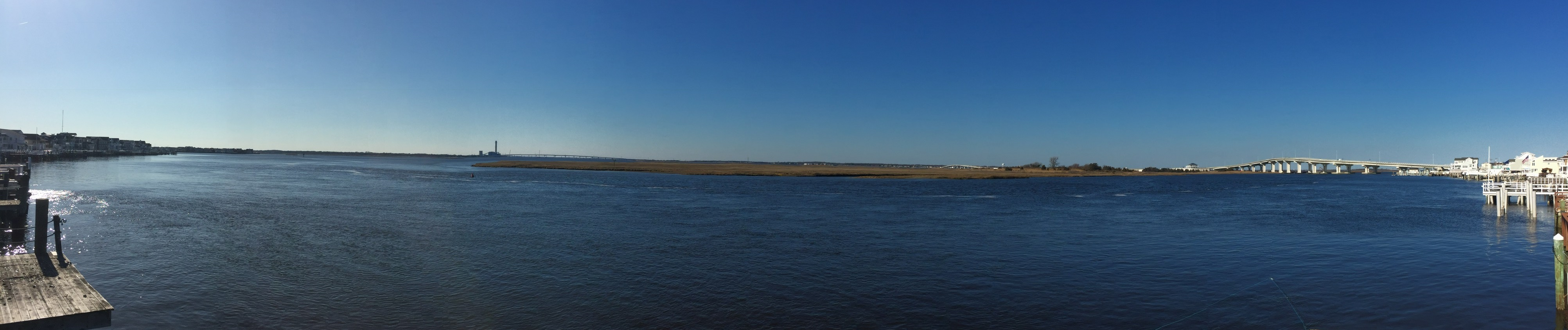
- Great Egg Harbor Bay facing west, with the Great Egg Harbor Bridge, Beesley's Point Generating Station, New Jersey Route 52, and the Rainbow Islands in background

- Location within New Jersey
- Location: Counties of Atlantic and Cape May in New Jersey
- Coordinates: 39°18′15″N 74°38′59″W
- River sources: Great Egg Harbor River
- Ocean/sea sources: Atlantic Ocean
- Basin countries: United States
- Max. length: 5.0 mi (8 km)
- Max. width: 2.8 mi (4.5 km)
- Surface area: 8.5 mi^{2} (22 km^{2})
- Islands: Cowpens Island, Rainbow Islands
- Settlements: Ocean City, Somers Point, Upper Township, Seaview Harbor, Longport

Great Egg Harbor Bay (or Great Egg Harbor) is a bay between Atlantic and Cape May counties along the southern New Jersey coast. The name derives from Dutch explorer Cornelius Jacobsen May's description of the plentiful birds laying eggs, naming the waters Eyren Haven, which translates to Egg Harbor in English. The bay has a total area of 8.5 mi^{2} (22 km^{2}). Its depth ranges from shallow waters in the southern extension, called Peck Bay, to a 33 ft (10 m) deep channel.

The Great Egg Harbor River and its 17 tributaries empty into the bay. During the Sangamonian interglacial period, the Great Egg Harbor River existed as a delta that covered much of southern Cape May County. Over time, the waterway shifted its course, emptying into the Atlantic Ocean at the Great Egg Harbor Inlet between Ocean City and Longport. In the eastern periphery, the bay measures 5.0 mi (8 km) along the coast, bordered by Ocean City on the east.

== History ==
During the Sangamonian interglacial period, melting glaciers formed rivers that carried sediment to the coast of the Atlantic Ocean. The formative Great Egg Harbor River existed as a delta at that time, covering much of what is now Cape May County. Over time, the river established its course to its present location. Currently, the Great Egg Harbor River and its 17 tributaries drain into the Great Egg Harbor Bay. The waterway enters the ocean between Ocean City and Longport at the Great Egg Harbor Inlet.

The first people in the region were the Leni-Lenape, who fished, clammed, and bathed in the summer months. In 1614, Dutch explorer Cornelius Jacobsen May discovered the bay, surrounded by plentiful birds laying eggs. May named the waterway Eyren Haven, translated to Egg Harbor. In 1693, the court of Cape May County appointed John Somers to operate the ferry service across the Great Egg Harbor Bay to Cape May County. That year, Somers purchased land from Thomas Budd, naming the property Somerset Plantation. John Somers' son, Richard, built Somers Mansion sometime between 1720 and 1726, which remains the oldest house still in existence in the county. The town name was changed to Somers Ferry, and then Somers Plantation, until the name Somers Point became established in 1750. During the 17th and 18th centuries, pirates and other boaters used Great Egg Harbor Bay as refuge. In 1880, one year after Ocean City was established as a Christian resort, regular steamboat service from Somers Point began. In 1897, the eastern boundaries of Peck Bay and Great Egg Harbor Bay served as the boundaries of newly established Ocean City.

=== Crossings ===
In 1907, the Atlantic City and Shore Railroad railroad line began operations, running from Atlantic City to Ocean City via Somers Point. The railroad's bridge across the Great Egg Harbor Bay burned in 1946, and was not rebuilt; the line was abandoned in 1948. In 1914, the Ocean City Automobile Bridge Company financed the construction of a toll bridge linking Somers Point and Ocean City. In 1921, the bridge became free when it was bought by the state of New Jersey, and was entirely replaced by the World War Memorial Bridge in 1933. This bridge, designated New Jersey Route 52, was itself replaced by a wider and taller bridge in 2012.

In 1928, a bridge in northern Ocean City opened, crossing Great Egg Harbor Inlet to marshlands in Atlantic County. Also in 1928, the Ocean City Automobile Club financed the Beesley's Point Bridge, which connected Somers Point to Beesley's Point, New Jersey via the Great Egg Harbor Bay. This bridge was closed in 2004 due to damage, and was demolished in 2016. In 1955, the Great Egg Harbor Bridge was built, and a parallel bridge carrying northbound traffic of the Garden State Parkway opened in 1973. The 1955 bridge was replaced in 2016, and the northbound bridge was subsequently refurbished, with completion in 2019.

== Features ==
Map of Great Egg Harbor Bay, surrounding waterways, and nearby towns

At the head of the Great Egg Harbor Bay, the Great Egg Harbor River joins the Middle and Tuckahoe Rivers between Upper Township and Egg Harbor Township. The bay is part of New Jersey's backbarrier lagoon system. The bay exists as a drowned, or submerged, river valley. The waterway covers an area of 8.5 mi^{2} (22 km^{2}), measuring 5.0 mi (8 km) along the coast, and extending 2.8 mi (4.5 km) inland. The tidal range varies from a 5.0 ft (1.52 m) spring tide to a 2.3 ft (0.7 m) neap tide. Coastal storms can cause extreme tidal variations. The bay has a salinity between 17 and 32 ppt (parts per thousand), classified as polyhaline. The tidal circulation of the bay is counterclockwise, fed by the deep channels. The quality of the water is good, despite nearby urban development and dissolved oxygen. Stormwater drains in nearby Ocean City feed directly into the bay.

Adjacent to the bay is 18,932 acres (7,662 ha) of salty marshes, which in the western portion of the bay is part of Lester G. McNamara Wildlife Management Area. The bay is also bounded by sandy beaches and settlements. Water depth in the bay range from less than 3.3 ft (1 m) to greater than 33 ft (10 m) in the main water channel, which extends from the Great Egg Harbor Inlet to the mouth of the Tuckahoe and Great Egg Harbor rivers.

The channels in the bay carry sand and shell debris to the Great Egg Harbor Inlet. At the inlet, the shifting currents produce a hazardous waterway to boats, due to changes in the channel related to shoaling. To improve navigation and replenish beaches in Ocean City, the United States Army Corps of Engineers has periodically dredged sand from a location 5,000 ft (1,500 m) offshore the Great Egg Harbor Inlet.

Peck's Bay is a shallow extension of Great Egg Harbor Bay, located on the waterway's southern periphery between Ocean City and the Cape May County mainland. Peck's Bay also serves as part of the New Jersey Intracoastal Waterway, connecting the Great Egg Harbor Bay with Crook Horn Creek. This waterway is along the west side of Ocean City, which reaches the ocean at Corson Inlet, and also continues as the Intercoastal southward through Cape May County.

== Islands ==
Sediment from the rivers produce shoals and mudflats, which rise out of the bay to form a series of marshy islands. Rising seas are shrinking the islands by 0.28 in (7 mm) per year: from 1940 to 1991, their area decreased by 5%. Among the largest islands are Cowpens Island and Shooting Island, both near Ocean City. The latter, which is part of Cape May Wetlands Wildlife Management Area, has been eroding since at least 1930. In 2018, Act Engineers Inc. began a $2.75 million project to install 1,450 ft (440 m) of concrete blocks, which would provide shelter for oysters and restore the island's marshes. In the middle of the bay are the Rainbow Islands, which total 250 acres (100 ha) in area, but which are submerged during high tide.

== Ecosystem ==
The waterway and its channels carrying silt produce a soft bottom, creating a good habitat for shellfish that covers a 706 acres (286 ha) area. Other invertebrates in the bay include mussels, barnacles, amphipods, mysids, and worms. In shallow waters where sunlight can reach the bottom, algae and seagrasses grow. The bay serves as breeding grounds for hard clams and oysters. There are 32 species of fish in the bay, including six species that use the bay as spawning grounds. The endangered Leatherback sea turtle, and other turtle species, occupy the coastal waters of New Jersey, including in the bay. Dozens of bird species use the water and adjacent marsh lands as breeding grounds. Cowpens Island, located within the bay, is a bird sanctuary and a heron rookery. The region is one of the top 20 migratory bird locations in the country.

== Industry ==
By the 18th century, Somers Point had several shipyards along the Great Egg Harbor Bay, supporting the shipbuilding industry. Shellfish harvesting is allowed from November 1 to April 30. Jet ski operations are popular along the bay in the summertime.

The barrier islands to the north and south – Ocean City and Longport – are heavily developed, with bulkheads modifying the natural coastline.
