= Egg Harbor Township, New Jersey =

Township in Atlantic County, New Jersey, US

- Township
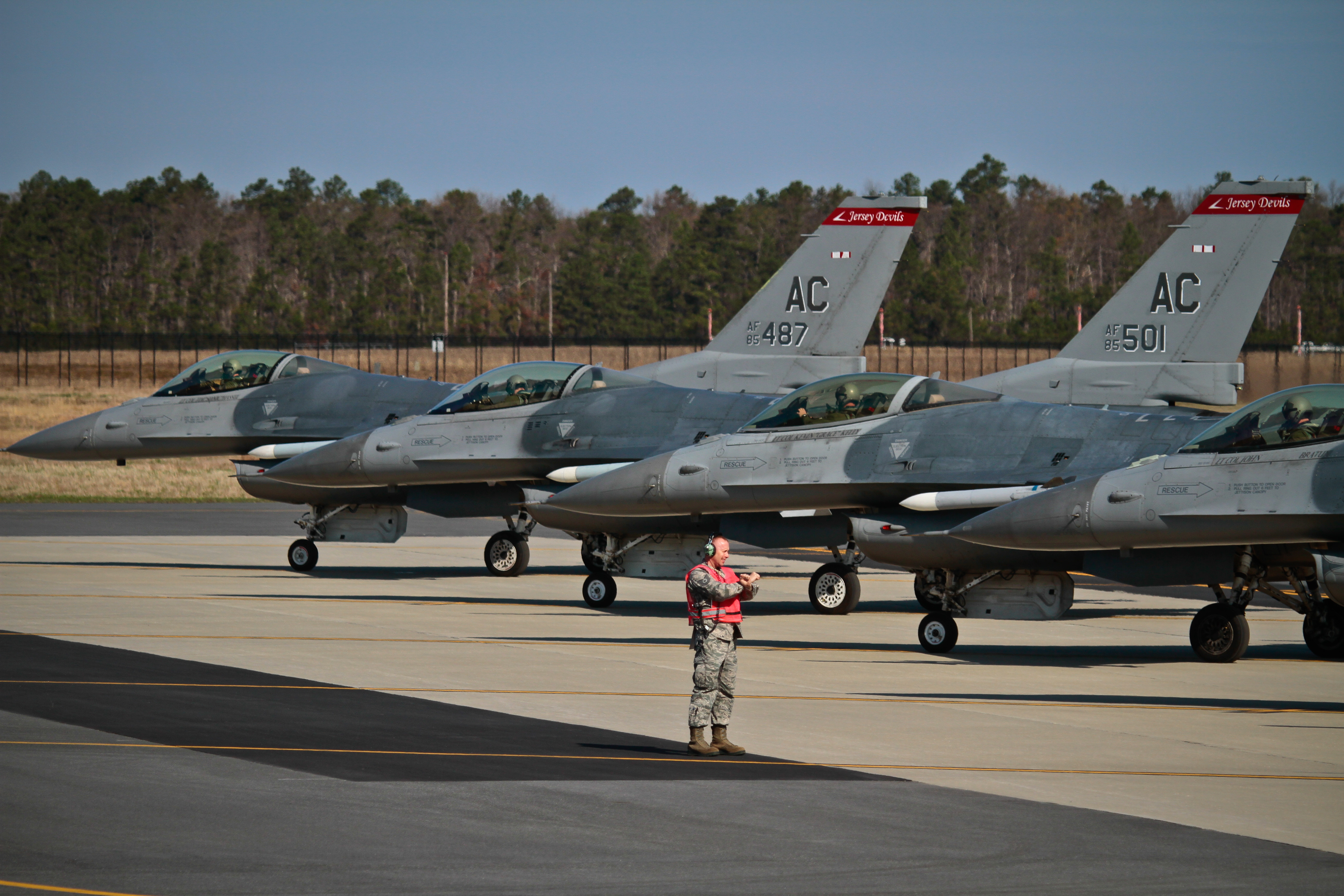
- The majority of Atlantic City International Airport (IATA: ACY), a shared civilian and military airport, is situated in Egg Harbor Township.

- Seal

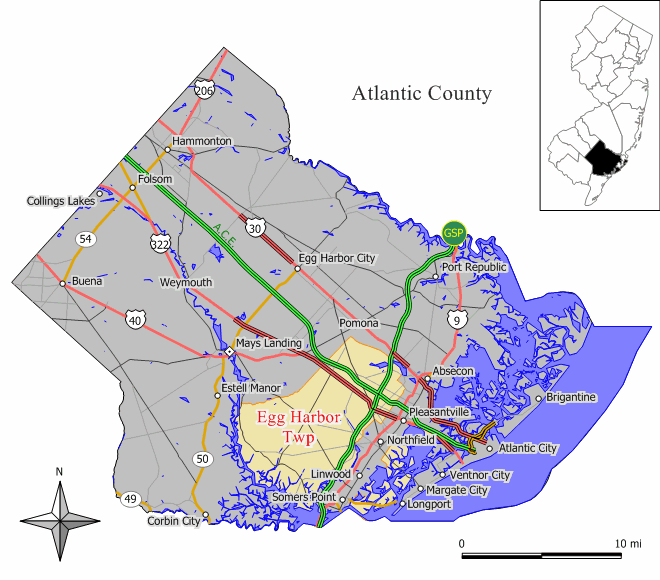
- Location of Egg Harbor Township in Atlantic County highlighted in yellow (left). Inset map: Location of Atlantic County in New Jersey highlighted in black (right).

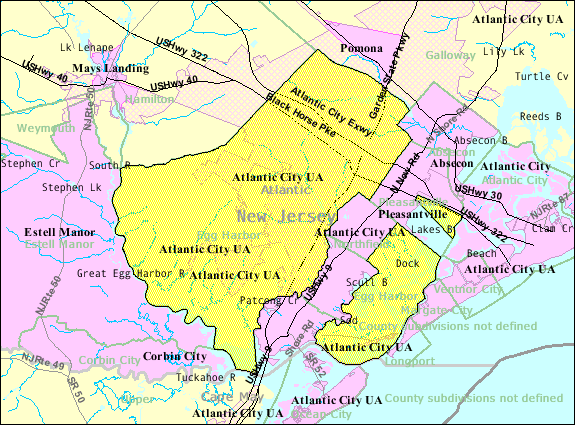
- Census Bureau map of Egg Harbor Township, New Jersey

- Location in Atlantic County Location in New Jersey Location in the United States
- Coordinates: 39.378291°N 74.599779°W
- Country: United States
- State: New Jersey
- County: Atlantic
- Established: 1693
- Incorporated: February 21, 1798
- Named for: Bird eggs

Government
  - Type: Township
  - Body: Township Committee
  - Mayor: Laura Pfrommer (R, term ends December 31, 2026)
  - Administrator: Donna L. Markulic
  - Municipal clerk: Eileen M. Tedesco

Area
  - Total: 75.48 sq mi (195.48 km^{2})
  - Land: 67.05 sq mi (173.65 km^{2})
  - Water: 8.42 sq mi (21.82 km^{2}) 11.16%
- Elevation: 43 ft (13 m)

Population (2020)
  - Total: 47,842
  - Estimate (2023): 47,861
  - Rank: 42nd of 565 in state 1st of 23 in county
  - Density: 713.6/sq mi (275.5/km^{2})
  - Rank: 418th of 565 in state 11th of 23 in county
- Time zone: UTC−05:00 (Eastern (EST))
  - Summer (DST): UTC−04:00 (Eastern (EDT))
- ZIP Codes: 08232, 08234
- Area code: 609
- FIPS code: 3400120290
- GNIS feature ID: 0882051
- Website: www.ehtnj.gov

Egg Harbor Township is a township in Atlantic County, in the U.S. state of New Jersey. As of the 2020 United States census, the township's population was 47,842, its highest decennial count ever and an increase of 4,519 (+10.4%) from the 2010 census count of 43,323, which in turn reflected an increase of 12,597 (+41.0%) from the 30,726 counted in the 2000 census.

Egg Harbor Township was first mentioned as part of Gloucester County in records dating back to March 20, 1693, and at times was called New Weymouth. The township's western boundary was established on May 13, 1761, with the area called Great Egg-Harbour Township. Portions of the township were taken to form Galloway Township, which was established by Royal charter on April 4, 1774. Additional portions were taken to form Weymouth Township on February 12, 1798. On February 21, 1798, the area was incorporated as Egg-Harbour Township. Over the ensuing centuries, portions of the township were taken to create many new municipalities: Hamilton Township on February 5, 1813; Atlantic City on May 1, 1854; Absecon on May 1, 1854; South Atlantic City (now Margate City) on September 7, 1885; Pleasantville on January 10, 1889; Linwood on February 20, 1889; Somers Point on April 24, 1886; Longport on March 7, 1898; Ventnor City on March 17, 1903; and Northfield on March 21, 1905. Geographically, the township, and all of Atlantic County, is part of the South Jersey region and of the Atlantic City-Hammonton metropolitan statistical area, which in turn is included in the Philadelphia metropolitan area.

Great Egg Harbor got its name from Dutch explorer Cornelius Jacobsen Mey. In 1614, Mey came upon the inlet to the Great Egg Harbor River. The meadows were so covered with the eggs of waterfowl and shorebirds that he called it "Eieren Haven" (Egg Harbor).

== History ==
The first residents of what would become Egg Harbor Township were the Lenni Lenape Native Americans, who would spend their summers on the elevated land around the cedar swamp that is now Bargaintown Lake, as well as along the banks of Patcong Creek, where they made use of the abundant fish, shellfish, wild berries, and bird's eggs in the area and collected shells that could be carved to make wampum.

Great Egg Harbor was part of Gloucester County, West Jersey. On May 17, 1694 a law was passed that made this official, reading:

And forasmuch as there are some families settled upon Egg Harbour, and of right ought to be under some jurisdiction. Be it enacted by the authority aforesaid, that the inhabitants of the said Egg Harbour, shall be and belong to the jurisdiction of Gloucester county, to all intents and purposes, till such time as they shall be capable, by a copetent [sic] number of inhabitants, to be erected into a county, any former act to the contrary notwithstanding.

— An Act for regulating Bounds of Cape May County, and for Egg Harbour Inhabitants to belong to Gloucester County

The same Act set the legal boundaries of Gloucester County from the Delaware River, along the Burlington County line to the sea and back up the Great Egg Harbor River to the Delaware River. At that time Great Egg Harbor encompassed all of present-day Atlantic County. In 1837, Atlantic County was set apart from Gloucester County and the Townships were Egg Harbor, Galloway, Hamilton and Weymouth.

Since 1837, ten municipalities have separated from the original Egg Harbor Township, including Atlantic City (1854), Absecon (1872), South Atlantic City (1885; now Margate City), Somers Point (1886), Pleasantville (1888), Linwood (1889), Longport (1898), Brigantine (1903), Ventnor City (1903) and Northfield (1905).

In 2017, Egg Harbor township joined Bellmawr, Cranbury, Montclair, and Woodbridge Township as one of the first five municipalities in New Jersey to authorize medical cannabis dispensaries.

== Geography ==
According to the United States Census Bureau, the township had a total area of 75.47 square miles (195.48 km^{2}), including 67.05 square miles (173.65 km^{2}) of land and 8.43 square miles (21.82 km^{2}) of water (11.16%).

Portions of the township, notably the West Atlantic City and Anchorage Poynte areas, are not contiguous to the main body of the municipality, having been separated from the mainland portion of the township as municipalities were formed, largely since the boroughitis phenomenon in the 1890s.

The township is one of 56 South Jersey municipalities that are included within the New Jersey Pinelands National Reserve, a protected natural area of unique ecology covering 1,100,000 acres (450,000 ha), that has been classified as a United States Biosphere Reserve and established by Congress in 1978 as the nation's first National Reserve. Part of the township is included in the state-designated Pinelands Area, which includes portions of Atlantic County, along with areas in Burlington, Camden, Cape May, Cumberland, Gloucester and Ocean counties.

Egg Harbor Township includes the unincorporated communities of Bargaintown (the township's seat of government), Cardiff, English Creek, Farmington, Scullville (formerly known as Jeffers), Steelmanville and West Atlantic City, as well as part of McKee City. Other localities and place names located partially or completely within the township include Devenshire, English Creek Landing, Greenwood, Idlewood, Jeffers Landing, Jobs Point, Jones Island, McKee City Station, Mount Calvary, Pleasantville Terrace, Pork Island, Rainbow Islands, Sculls Landing, and Seaview Harbor.

The township borders the municipalities of Absecon, Atlantic City, Corbin City, Estell Manor, Galloway Township, Hamilton Township, Linwood, Longport, Margate City, Northfield, Pleasantville, Somers Point, Ventnor City and Weymouth Township in Atlantic County; and Ocean City and Upper Township in Cape May County.

=== Parks and protected areas ===
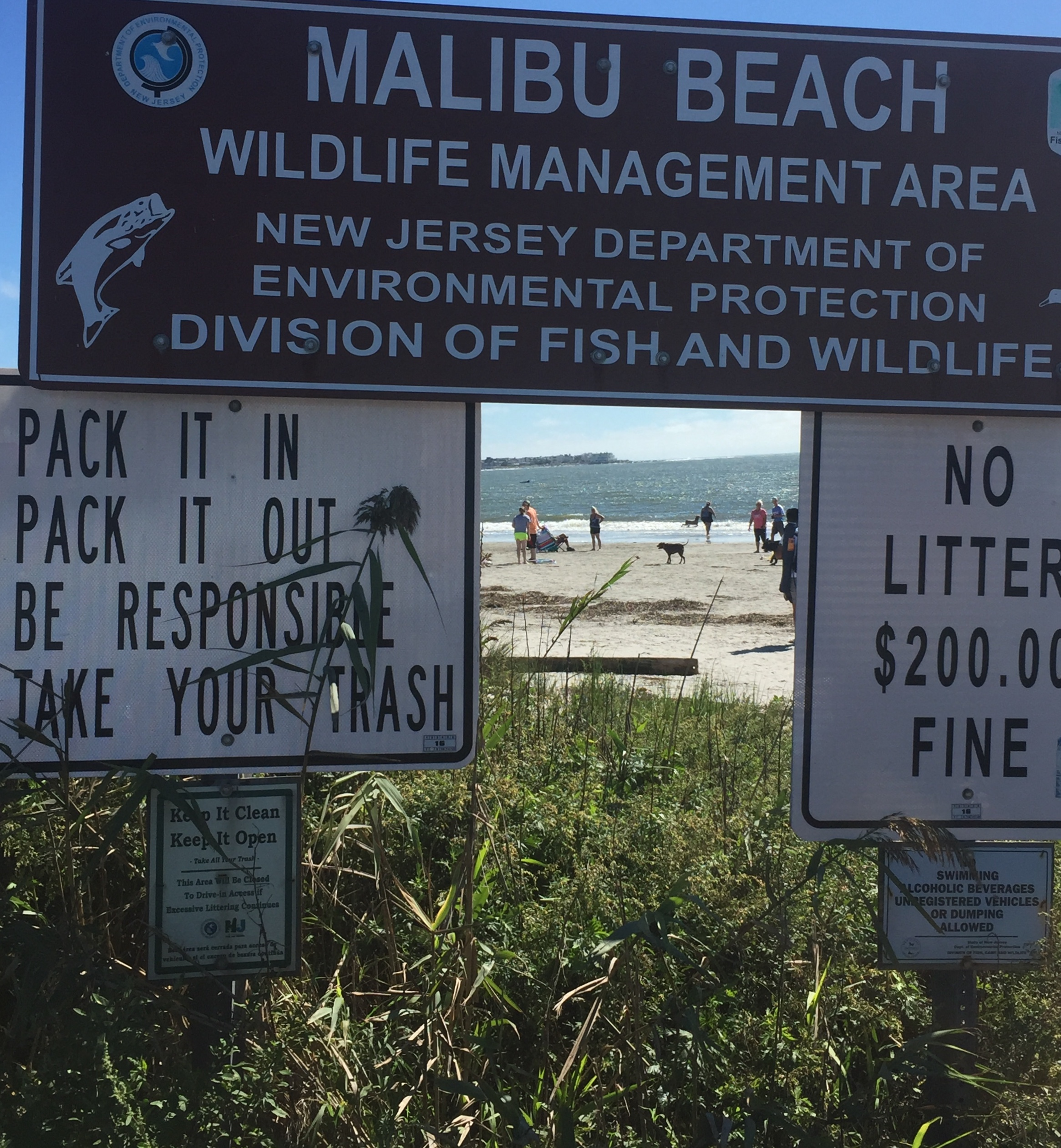
Sign for the Malibu Beach Wildlife Management Area

There are three wildlife management areas (WMAs) in Egg Harbor Township, two of them in the eastern discontinuous segment of the township. Malibu Beach WMA is located on marshlands between the Great Egg Harbor Bay and Broad Thorofare, covering 95.7 acres (38.7 ha), and bifurcated by Ocean Drive and NJ 152. It serves as the habitat for several birds, including migratory species in the spring and fall. Known locally as "Dog Beach", the WMA consists of a back-bay pond, dunes, and one of the only beaches in New Jersey that permits dogs. From the 1930s to the early 2000s, Malibu Beach lost about 1,000 ft (300 m) of sand due to erosion. The Environmental Protection Agency designated the beach as a priority wetland in 1994. From 2002 to 2004, the state Department of Environmental Protection purchased Malibu Beach for $975,000 to make it available to the public, with funding from the Federal Highway Administration related to the NJ 52 causeway replacement project. About 40,000 yd^{3} (31,000 m^{3}) of clean sand was dredged from nearby waterways and placed on Malibu Beach. The state also restored the beach's wetlands, and removed rubble and invasive plant species. In 2012, Hurricane Sandy severely eroded the beach, as did Winter Storm Jonas in 2015. In 2017, the city of Ocean City began collecting trash from the site, after the Cape May County Bridge Commission ended collection in Fall 2016, and the state considered shutting down the park.

Adjacent to Malibu Beach WMA is Pork Island WMA, which covers 867.2 acres (350.9 ha) of land on four marshy islands between NJ 152 and Margate Blvd, and between Absecon Island and the mainland. It is inaccessible by car. In the southern part of Egg Harbor Township are scattered plots of wetland near the Great Egg Harbor River that consist of about 1,039 acres (420 ha), or 5.9%, of the Lester G. MacNamara WMA, previously known as Tuckahoe WMA. Established in 1933, the WMA is the oldest in the state, and spreads across four municipalities in Atlantic and Cape May counties.

The area is home to the Egg Harbor Township Nature Reserve, a former mining site that was converted into a park in 2013.

== Demographics ==
Historical population
Census	Pop.	Note	%±
1810	1,830		—
1820	1,635	*	−10.7%
1830	2,510		53.5%
1840	2,739		9.1%
1850	2,689		−1.8%
1860	3,207	*	19.3%
1870	3,585		11.8%
1880	3,568		−0.5%
1890	3,027	*	−15.2%
1900	1,863	*	−38.5%
1910	1,110	*	−40.4%
1920	1,360		22.5%
1930	3,024		122.4%
1940	3,066		1.4%
1950	4,991		62.8%
1960	5,593		12.1%
1970	9,882		76.7%
1980	19,381		96.1%
1990	24,544		26.6%
2000	30,726		25.2%
2010	43,323		41.0%
2020	47,842		10.4%
2023 (est.)	47,861		0.0%
Population sources: 1810–1920 1810–1830; 1840–2000 1840 1850–1870; 1850 1870 1880–1890; 1890–1910 1910–1930; 1940–2000 2000; 2010 2020 * = Lost territory in previous decade.

=== 2010 census ===
The 2010 United States census counted 43,323 people, 15,250 households, and 11,316 families in the township. The population density was 650.5 per square mile (251.2/km^{2}). There were 16,347 housing units at an average density of 245.5 per square mile (94.8/km^{2}). The racial makeup was 69.78% (30,230) White, 9.58% (4,152) Black or African American, 0.38% (163) Native American, 11.76% (5,096) Asian, 0.02% (8) Pacific Islander, 5.20% (2,253) from other races, and 3.28% (1,421) from two or more races. Hispanic or Latino of any race were 13.00% (5,630) of the population.

Of the 15,250 households, 36.5% had children under the age of 18; 56.1% were married couples living together; 12.5% had a female householder with no husband present and 25.8% were non-families. Of all households, 20.3% were made up of individuals and 7.0% had someone living alone who was 65 years of age or older. The average household size was 2.84 and the average family size was 3.29.

26.2% of the population were under the age of 18, 7.3% from 18 to 24, 26.0% from 25 to 44, 29.7% from 45 to 64, and 10.8% who were 65 years of age or older. The median age was 39.2 years. For every 100 females, the population had 95.4 males. For every 100 females ages 18 and older there were 92.1 males.

The Census Bureau's 2006–2010 American Community Survey showed that (in 2010 inflation-adjusted dollars) median household income was $69,754 (with a margin of error of +/− $4,024) and the median family income was $78,259 (+/− $4,966). Males had a median income of $52,615 (+/− $3,434) versus $42,227 (+/− $2,127) for females. The per capita income for the township was $29,114 (+/− $1,241). About 4.0% of families and 6.1% of the population were below the poverty line, including 8.8% of those under age 18 and 4.8% of those age 65 or over.

=== 2000 census ===
As of the 2000 United States census there were 30,726 people, 11,199 households, and 8,108 families residing in the township. The population density was people per square mile (176.1/km^{2}). There were 12,067 housing units at an average density of 179.2 per square mile (69.2/km^{2}). The racial makeup of the township was 79.42% White, 10.37% African American, 0.21% Native American, 5.05% Asian, 0.05% Pacific Islander, 2.82% from other races, and 2.07% from two or more races. Hispanic or Latino of any race were 6.76% of the population.

There were 11,199 households, out of which 37.5% had children under the age of 18 living with them, 55.3% were married couples living together, 12.6% had a female householder with no husband present, and 27.6% were non-families. 22.0% of all households were made up of individuals, and 7.1% had someone living alone who was 65 years of age or older. The average household size was 2.74 and the average family size was 3.23.

In the township the population was spread out, with 27.9% under the age of 18, 6.6% from 18 to 24, 32.6% from 25 to 44, 23.7% from 45 to 64, and 9.2% who were 65 years of age or older. The median age was 36 years. For every 100 females, there were 94.6 males. For every 100 females age 18 and over, there were 90.7 males.

The median income for a household in the township was $52,550, and the median income for a family was $60,032. Males had a median income of $40,033 versus $30,643 for females. The per capita income for the township was $22,328. About 4.2% of families and 5.4% of the population were below the poverty line, including 6.2% of those under age 18 and 9.3% of those age 65 or over.

== Economy ==
Harbor Square (formerly the Shore Mall) is a redesigned regional mall that had originally opened in 1968, located on U.S. Route 40 / U.S. Route 322.

Spencer Gifts, the parent company of Spirit Halloween, has been headquartered in Egg Harbor Township since 1977.

=== Development and the Pine Barrens ===
Egg Harbor Township (along with Hamilton and Galloway Townships) were designated as Regional Growth Areas" by the New Jersey Pinelands Commission resulting in increased residential development. In exchange for the development in Egg Harbor Township, no trees are demolished for housing and other buildings in the Pine Barrens, also known as the Pinelands. The "Regional Growth Area" designation was, and remains, tantamount to a state mandate to construct +/− 30,000 additional housing units in Egg Harbor Township. Neighboring communities, Galloway Township (to the north) and Hamilton Township (to the West) were also designated as "Growth Areas" by the New Jersey Pinelands Commission.

In January 2007, the Egg Harbor Township Planning Board issued site approval for 667 new homes (and a new fire station) in the Farmington section of Egg Harbor Township. The "Village at Farmington" will be developed by PulteGroup and is proposed to include 140 townhouses, 261 planned adult homes (55 and older) and 259 single family detached dwellings, as well as a community clubhouse, a second club house for 55 and older, recreation fields and walking paths to be constructed on a site covering 273.6 acres (1.107 km^{2}). PulteGroup will pay over $800,000 to the Egg Harbor Township recreation fund because the club houses and paths do not satisfy the township's recreation requirements for a development of this size and, as part of the approval, PulteGroup will also contribute $350,000 toward the construction of a new Farmington Fire Station with the landowners, Schoffer Enterprises, donating the land.

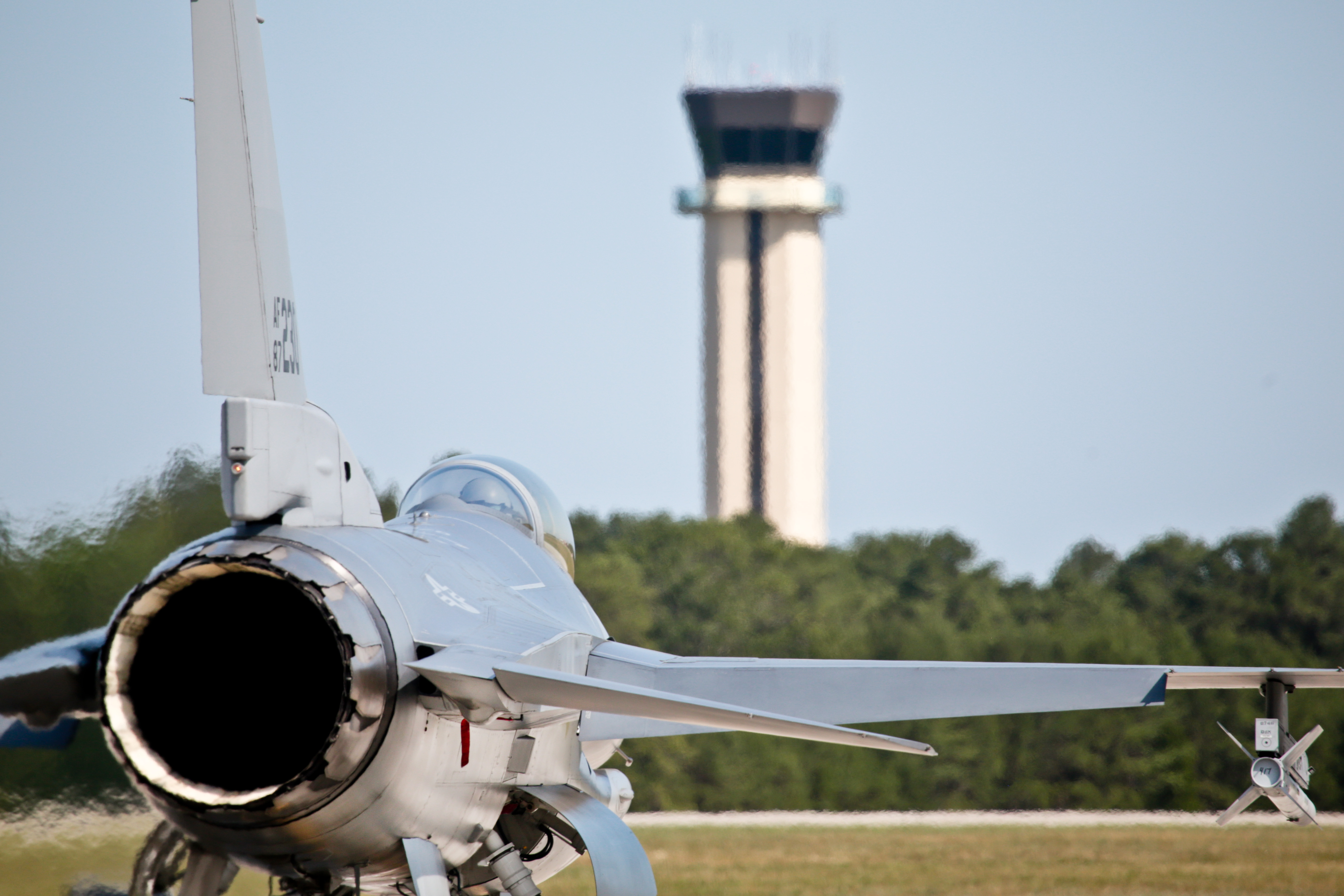
Atlantic City Air National Guard Base

Once approvals are complete, PulteGroup will build 60 units of each type per year until the project is complete, offering single family homes in the mid $300,000's and the adult homes for $250,000.

The Planning Board has requested that paperwork presented to the homeowners at purchase will "fully disclose" to prospective purchasers that there exists a nearby airport (Atlantic City International Airport, which, in addition to functioning as a full service airport, is home to the 177th wing of the Air National Guard, the FAA Technical Center, a Homeland Security Department Training Center as well as the Atlantic City base of Operations for the United States Coast Guard), meaning they will be in the proximity of the approach and takeoff patterns for both incoming and outgoing aircraft, the Atlantic County Municipal Utility Authority (ACMUA), where all local municipalities bring their trash and recycle. The disclosure will inform prospective buyers that, from time to time, the ACMUA Facility is odoriferous and that a training/shooting range is part of the military/industrial portion of the Airport.

== Government ==
=== Local government ===
The Township of Egg Harbor is governed under the Township form of New Jersey municipal government, one of 141 municipalities (of the 564) statewide that use this form, the second-most commonly used form of government in the state. The Township Committee is comprised of five members, who are elected directly by the voters at-large in partisan elections to serve three-year terms of office on a staggered basis, with either one or two seats coming up for election each year as part of the November general election in a three-year cycle. The Mayor and Deputy Mayor are chosen by the Township Committee from among its members during the Reorganization meeting each January. The members of Township Committee are part-time elected officials.

As of 2026, members of the Egg Harbor Township Committee are Mayor Laura Pfrommer (R, term on committee and as mayor ends 2026), Deputy Mayor Ray Ellis, Jr. (R, term on committee ends 2027; term as deputy mayor ends 2026), Pete Castellano (D, 2028), Paul W. Hodson (R, 2026) and Patrick Ireland (R, appointed to an unexpired term ending 2027).

=== Federal, state and county representation ===
Egg Harbor Township is located in the 2nd Congressional District and is part of New Jersey's 2nd state legislative district.

For the 119th United States Congress, New Jersey's 2nd congressional district is represented by Jeff Van Drew (R, Dennis Township). New Jersey is represented in the United States Senate by Democrats Cory Booker (Newark, term ends 2027) and Andy Kim (Moorestown, term ends 2031).

For the 2026–2027 session, the 2nd legislative district of the New Jersey Legislature is represented in the New Jersey Senate by Vincent J. Polistina (R, Egg Harbor Township) and in the General Assembly by Don Guardian (R, Atlantic City) and Maureen Rowan (D, Atlantic City).

Atlantic County is governed by a directly elected county executive and a nine-member Board of County Commissioners, responsible for legislation. The executive serves a four-year term and the commissioners are elected to staggered three-year terms, of which four are elected from the county on an at-large basis and five of the commissioners represent equally populated districts. As of 2025, Atlantic County's Executive is Dennis Levinson (R, Northfield), whose term of office ends December 31, 2027. Members of the Board of County Commissioners are:

Ernest D. Coursey (D, District 1-- Atlantic City, Egg Harbor Township (part), Longport, Margate City, and Ventnor City; 2025, Atlantic City), Chair Maureen Kern (R, District 2-- Egg Harbor Township (part), Linwood, Northfield, Somers Point and Pleasantville; 2027, Somers Point), Andrew Parker III (R, District 3-- Egg Harbor Township (part) and Hamilton Township (part); 2026, Egg Harbor Township), Richard R. Dase (R, District 4, including Brigantine, Galloway Township, Egg Harbor Township (part), and Port Republic; 2025, Galloway Township), Vice Chair James A. Bertino (R, District 5-- Buena, Buena Vista Township, Corbin City, Egg Harbor City, Estell Manor, Folsom, Hamilton Township (part), Hammonton, Mullica Township and Weymouth Township; 2027, Hammonton), June Byrnes (R, At-Large; 2026, Linwood), Michael Ruffu (R, At-Large; Margate, 2027) Amy L. Gatto (R, At-large; 2025, Hamilton Township) and John W. Risley (R, At-Large; 2026, Egg Harbor Township)

Atlantic County's constitutional officers are: Clerk Joesph J. Giralo (R, 2026, Hammonton), Sheriff Joe O'Donoghue (R, 2026, Egg Harbor Township) and Surrogate James Curcio (R, 2025, Hammonton).

The Federal Aviation Administration William J. Hughes Technical Center is on the property of Atlantic City Airport, and in Egg Harbor Township.

=== Politics ===
As of March 2011, there were a total of 24,922 registered voters in Egg Harbor Township, of which 5,829 (23.4% vs. 30.5% countywide) were registered as Democrats, 6,976 (28.0% vs. 25.2%) were registered as Republicans and 12,108 (48.6% vs. 44.3%) were registered as Unaffiliated. There were 9 voters registered to other parties. Among the township's 2010 Census population, 57.5% (vs. 58.8% in Atlantic County) were registered to vote, including 78.0% of those ages 18 and over (vs. 76.6% countywide).

Gubernatorial election results for Egg Harbor Township
Year	Republican		Democratic		Third party(ies)	
Year	No.	%	No.	%	No.	%
2025	8,513	48.19%	9,099	51.50%	55	0.31%
2021	7,903	56.27%	6,050	43.08%	91	0.65%
2017	4,355	44.03%	5,330	53.88%	207	2.09%
2013	6,874	64.03%	3,717	34.63%	144	1.34%
2009	5,795	53.86%	4,236	39.37%	729	6.78%
2005	4,187	48.14%	4,202	48.31%	309	3.55%

In the 2012 presidential election, Democrat Barack Obama received 9,854 votes here (54.5% vs. 57.9% countywide), ahead of Republican Mitt Romney with 7,989 votes (44.2% vs. 41.1%) and other candidates with 158 votes (0.9% vs. 0.9%), among the 18,089 ballots cast by the township's 27,052 registered voters, for a turnout of 66.9% (vs. 65.8% in Atlantic County). In the 2008 presidential election, Democrat Barack Obama received 9,741 votes here (53.0% vs. 56.5% countywide), ahead of Republican John McCain with 8,303 votes (45.1% vs. 41.6%) and other candidates with 223 votes (1.2% vs. 1.1%), among the 18,394 ballots cast by the township's 25,393 registered voters, for a turnout of 72.4% (vs. 68.1% in Atlantic County). In the 2004 presidential election, Republican George W. Bush received 7,658 votes here (51.6% vs. 46.2% countywide), ahead of Democrat John Kerry with 6,981 votes (47.1% vs. 52.0%) and other candidates with 106 votes (0.7% vs. 0.8%), among the 14,830 ballots cast by the township's 19,664 registered voters, for a turnout of 75.4% (vs. 69.8% in the whole county).

Presidential elections results
Year	Republican	Democratic	Third Parties
2024	51.9% 12,424	46.1% 11,035	2.0% 399
2020	47.3% 11,995	51.2% 12,986	1.5% 361
2016	47.2% 8,781	48.6% 9,039	4.2% 785
2012	44.2% 7,989	54.5% 9,854	0.9% 158
2008	45.1% 8,303	53.0% 9,741	1.2% 223
2004	51.6% 7,658	47.1% 6,981	0.7% 106

In the 2013 gubernatorial election, Republican Chris Christie received 6,874 votes here (62.7% vs. 60.0% countywide), ahead of Democrat Barbara Buono with 3,717 votes (33.9% vs. 34.9%) and other candidates with 144 votes (1.3% vs. 1.3%), among the 10,972 ballots cast by the township's 27,827 registered voters, yielding a 39.4% turnout (vs. 41.5% in the county). In the 2009 gubernatorial election, Republican Chris Christie received 5,795 votes here (53.4% vs. 47.7% countywide), ahead of Democrat Jon Corzine with 4,236 votes (39.1% vs. 44.5%), Independent Chris Daggett with 608 votes (5.6% vs. 4.8%) and other candidates with 121 votes (1.1% vs. 1.2%), among the 10,844 ballots cast by the township's 24,942 registered voters, yielding a 43.5% turnout (vs. 44.9% in the county).

United States Senate election results for Egg Harbor Township1
Year	Republican		Democratic		Third party(ies)	
Year	No.	%	No.	%	No.	%
2024	11,359	50.73%	10,597	47.32%	436	1.95%
2018	7,318	51.31%	6,421	45.02%	524	3.67%
2012	7,407	43.77%	9,225	54.52%	289	1.71%
2006	4,938	51.69%	4,385	45.90%	230	2.41%

United States Senate election results for Egg Harbor Township2
Year	Republican		Democratic		Third party(ies)	
Year	No.	%	No.	%	No.	%
2020	11,533	46.91%	12,585	51.19%	465	1.89%
2014	4,775	49.58%	4,657	48.36%	198	2.06%
2013	3,082	52.96%	2,675	45.97%	62	1.07%
2008	7,792	46.10%	8,839	52.29%	272	1.61%

== Surrounding communities ==
Note: This includes the adjacent municipalities that are in the "West Atlantic City and Anchorage Poynte" sections.

== Education ==
The Egg Harbor Township Schools serve public school students in pre-kindergarten through twelfth grade. As of the 2023–24 school year, the district, comprised of seven schools, had an enrollment of 7,473 students and 684.4 classroom teachers (on an FTE basis), for a student–teacher ratio of 10.9:1. Schools in the district (with 2023–24 enrollment data from the National Center for Education Statistics) are Bargaintown Preschool with 165 students in PreK, Davenport School Complex with 734 students in grades K–3, Swift-Slaybaugh School Complex with 1,414 students in grades PreK–3, Dr. Joyanne D. Miller Elementary School with 1,038 students in grade 4–5, Alder Avenue Middle School with 926 students in grade 6–8, Fernwood Avenue Middle School with 798 students in grade 6–8 and Egg Harbor Township High School with 2,299 students in grade 9–12.

Township public school students are also eligible to attend the Atlantic County Institute of Technology in the Mays Landing section of Hamilton Township or the Charter-Tech High School for the Performing Arts, located in Somers Point.

The Islamic Academy of South Jersey (Arabic: کادیمیه سوث جيرزي الإسلامیة) is an Islamic elementary day school located in Egg Harbor Township.

As of 2020 Bishop McHugh Regional School in Dennis Township in Cape May County accepts students from Egg Harbor Township. The school is under the Roman Catholic Diocese of Camden.

== Transportation ==
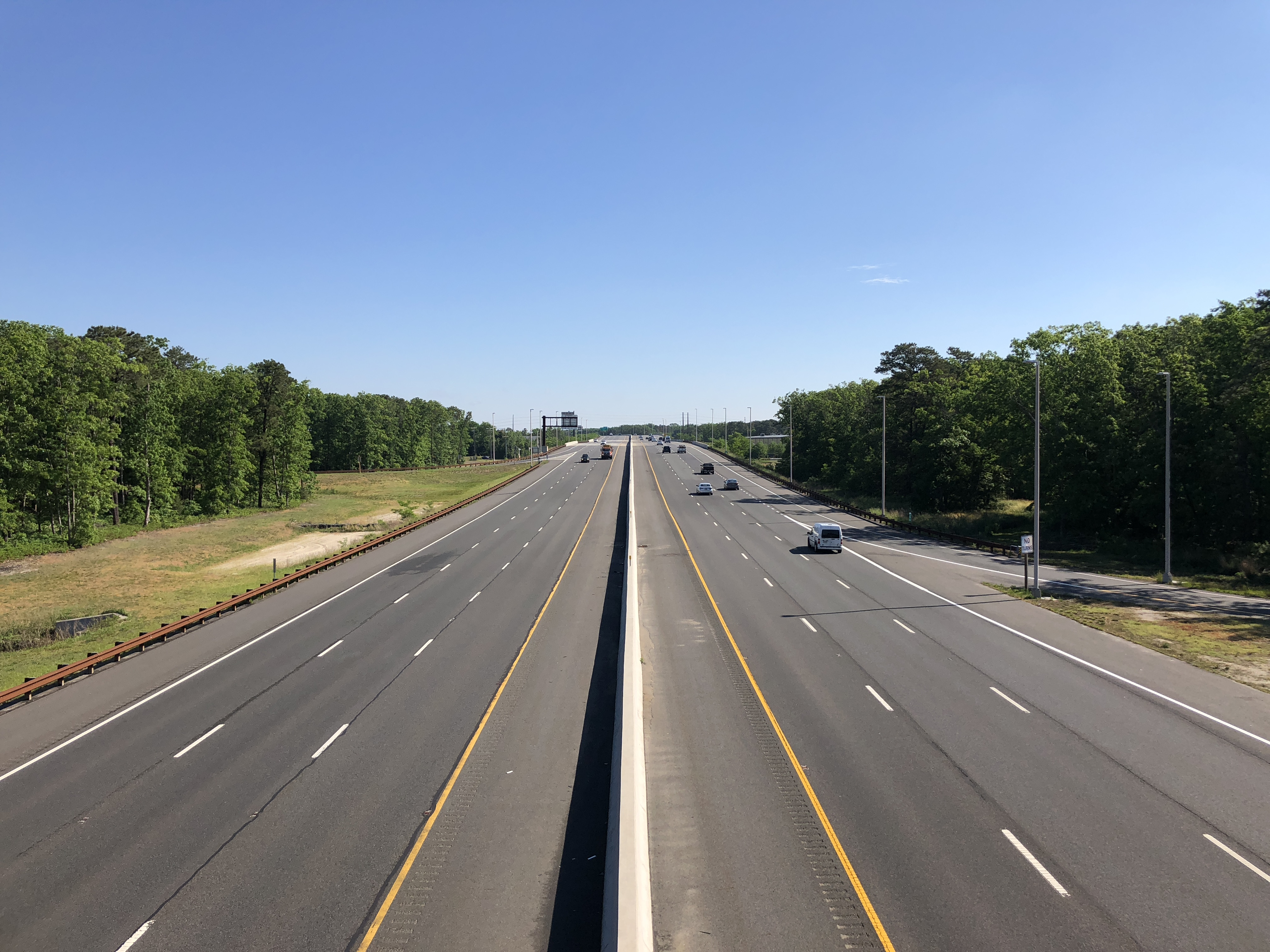
The northbound Garden State Parkway in Egg Harbor Township

=== Roads and highways ===
As of May 2010, the township had a total of 297.22 miles (478.33 km) of roadways, of which 206.73 miles (332.70 km) were maintained by the municipality, 65.46 miles (105.35 km) by Atlantic County, 10.10 miles (16.25 km) by the New Jersey Department of Transportation and 14.93 miles (24.03 km) by the New Jersey Turnpike Authority and South Jersey Transportation Authority.

The township is traversed by several major roadways. The Atlantic City Expressway runs through east–west for 5.3 miles (8.5 km) connecting Pleasantville in the east to Hamilton Township in the west and connects at Interchange 7 with the Garden State Parkway (at Interchange 38) that runs through north–south for 8.6 miles (13.8 km) connecting Somers Point in the south to Galloway Township in the north.

Major county roads that pass through include CR 559, CR 563, CR 575 and CR 585. U.S. Route 40 / 322 run concurrent with each other while going from east to west. U.S. Route 9 also runs through, although very briefly concurrent with the Parkway as it crosses over the Great Egg Harbor.

=== Public transportation ===
NJ Transit provides bus service between Egg Harbor Township and Atlantic City on routes 502 (from Atlantic Cape Community College), 507 (from Ocean City), 508 (from Hamilton Mall) and 509 (from Ocean City).

A majority of the Atlantic City International Airport is located in the northern area of the township.

== Points of interest ==
- The Atlantic County Bikeway stretches for 7.5 miles (12.1 km) from the Shore Mall to the Atlantic County Institute of Technology in Hamilton Township.
- Storybook Land is a park for children on a site covering 20 acres (8.1 ha) that was opened in 1955, featuring storybook characters such as Mother Goose and the Three Little Pigs.
- Jersey Shore Children's Museum provided an environment for children to stimulate creativity, imagination, and learning through interactive play. The museum closed at the end of 2017 in the wake of declining contributions.

== In popular culture ==
- Clique Girlz was a girl group that was established in 2007 as "Clique" by sisters Destinee and Paris Monroe, together with their friend Ariel Moore, all of Egg Harbor Township.

== Notable people ==
People who were born in, residents of, or otherwise closely associated with Egg Harbor Township include:

- Aarthi Agarwal (1984–2015), actress who primarily worked in Telugu cinema
- Anastasia Cannuscio (born 1992), ice dancer
- Esther Choi (born 1985), chef, hotel owner and television personality, best known for her appearances on the Food Network
- Steve Coates (born 1950), retired NHL hockey player and Philadelphia Flyers announcer
- Cameron Flukey (born 2005), professional baseball pitcher in the Detroit Tigers organization
- John F. Gaffney (1934–1995), politician who served in the New Jersey General Assembly, where he represented the 2nd Legislative District from 1992 until his death
- Toni Ann Gisondi (born 1972), best known for her role as Molly in the 1982 film Annie
- Steve Keiner, winner of the 1999 Nathan's Hot Dog Eating Contest in Coney Island, consuming 20 1/4 hot dogs in 12 minutes
- Ryan Lancaster (born 1985), professional basketball player
- James J. McCullough (born 1942), former member of the New Jersey Senate who served 24 terms as mayor of Egg Harbor Township
- Frederick P. Nickles (1948–2017), politician who represented the 2nd Legislative District in the New Jersey General Assembly from 1992 to 1994
- Vincent J. Polistina (born 1971), member of the New Jersey General Assembly from 2008 to 2012, where he represented the 2nd Legislative District
- Cathy Rush (born 1947), former women's basketball program head coach at Immaculata University who led the team to three consecutive AIAW national titles from 1972–1974
- Nicky Scarfo Jr. (born 1964) alleged member of the Lucchese crime family
- Dominic Sessa (born 2002), actor who made his film debut in Alexander Payne's 2023 coming-of-age film The Holdovers
- Blondy Wallace (1879–1937), professional football player and later convicted criminal during the Prohibition Era

== See also ==
- Egg Harbor City, New Jersey
- Little Egg Harbor Township, New Jersey
