= Jim Rumph =

American sculptor and painter (1942–1993)

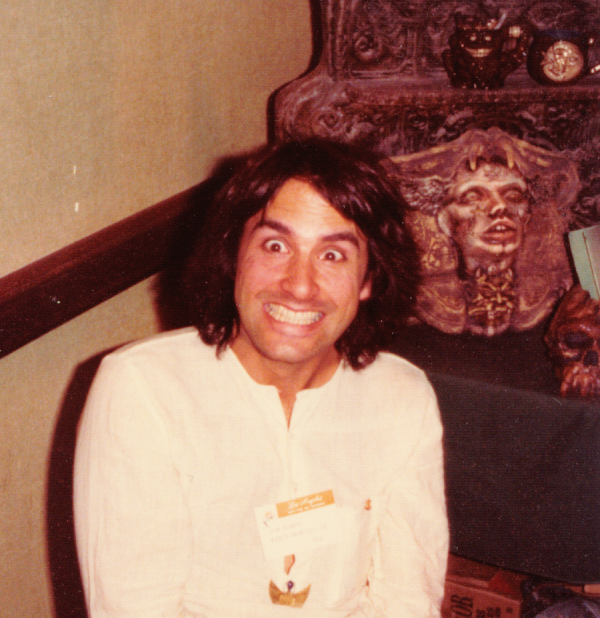
- Born: James Kelsey Calhoun; 17 August 1942; St. Louis, Missouri, U.S.
- Died: 1 September 1993 (aged 51); Los Angeles, California, U.S.
- Known for: ceramics, sculpture, painting, drawing
- Spouse: Daryle Ann (Powelson) Rumph
- Parents: Alan Duncan Calhoun (father); Patricia Rassieur Kelsey (mother)

James Kelsey Calhoun Rumph (August 17, 1942 – September 1, 1993) was an American artist noted for his ceramic creations. His work featured monsters, satyrs, nymphs and other fantastical creatures inspired by mythology, pop culture and the works of J.R.R. Tolkien, Ray Bradbury, Carl Sagan, Isaac Asimov; fantasy artists Frank Frazetta, Moebius, William Stout and Richard Corbin among many others.

== Early life ==
Jim Rumph was born James Kelsey Calhoun, in St. Louis, Missouri. His father, Alan Duncan Calhoun, died when James was three months old. His mother, Patricia Rassieur Kelsey, later married J.B. Rumph, and James took his stepfather's last name. Throughout his life, he signed his works with variations of his full name, including Calhoun, Rumph, Jim Rumph, JKCR, Karl Rumph and more.

== Artistic career ==
Rumph began selling his drawings, often inspired by Mad magazine and EC comics, when he was in the third grade. He remained a graphic artist and painter until the late 1960s, when he began experimenting with ceramics - initially pinch pots, later tankards depicting demons, movie and TV characters, planters and unique sculptures for which he would become known. His signature mugs often featured creatures inside, gradually revealed as the tankards were drained.

His alter ego, "Dr. Rumph," a wizened trickster with a hook in place of one hand, became a signature character in fliers and other promotional materials.

He is perhaps best known for his mass-produced Star Wars tankards - Darth Vader, Obi-Wan Kenobi and Chewbacca, which was George Lucas' personal favorite. Other movie character mugs include Admiral Kirk and Mr. Spock from Star Trek II: The Wrath of Khan, a Christopher Reeve Superman mug inspired by the 1978 film, Superman The Movie, and an E.T. The Extraterrestrial piggy bank featured on the cover with director Steven Spielberg's mother, Leah Adler, in People Magazine in 1982.

He ran a series of studios located first in Topanga Canyon, next on 18th Street in Santa Monica and finally on Sepulveda Boulevard in West Los Angeles. Each in turn was designated The Slyme Factory after the old English word for clay. Rumph also produced his handmade pieces under the name Rumph's Mind Circus, Cricket, Starmaker, and Tri-Mobius Studios among others.

As his business expanded to include mass-produced merchandise, Rumph farmed his work out to several well-known companies: McCoy Pottery (Richard Nixon and Spiro Agnew mugs), Berney-Karp (smoking paraphernalia, ashtrays), California Originals (Star Wars tankards) and Image Products (Star Trek II mugs). His earliest molds were hijacked by two employees and the subsequent castings were later reproduced by Ceramarte of Brazil, who then sold the pieces at JCPenney, Pier 1 Imports, Spencer Gifts, The Tinderbox and other tobacco and head shops. Aside from the Star Wars line, these mugs produced by Ceramarte were largely responsible for Rumph's nascent fame in the late 1970s.

Rumph also explored film, creating two animated films and a live action film-fantasy.

== Personal life ==
Jim Rumph married Daryle Ann Powelson. Some years after they divorced, she preceded him in death in 1991.

Rumph lived in various locations in Southern California: at his Slyme Factory studios in Topanga Canyon, Santa Monica and West Los Angeles. Like most artists, Rumph faced long periods of financial hardship, punctuated by rare periods of success, as in 1977-78 when he marketed his highly successful Star Wars tankards. He lost the rights the following year when the Lucasfilm licensing fees jumped to six figures.

== Death ==
Jim Rumph died on September 1, 1993. He was struck by a car.
