= Spirit Halloween =

American retailer

Spirit Halloween Superstores, LLC

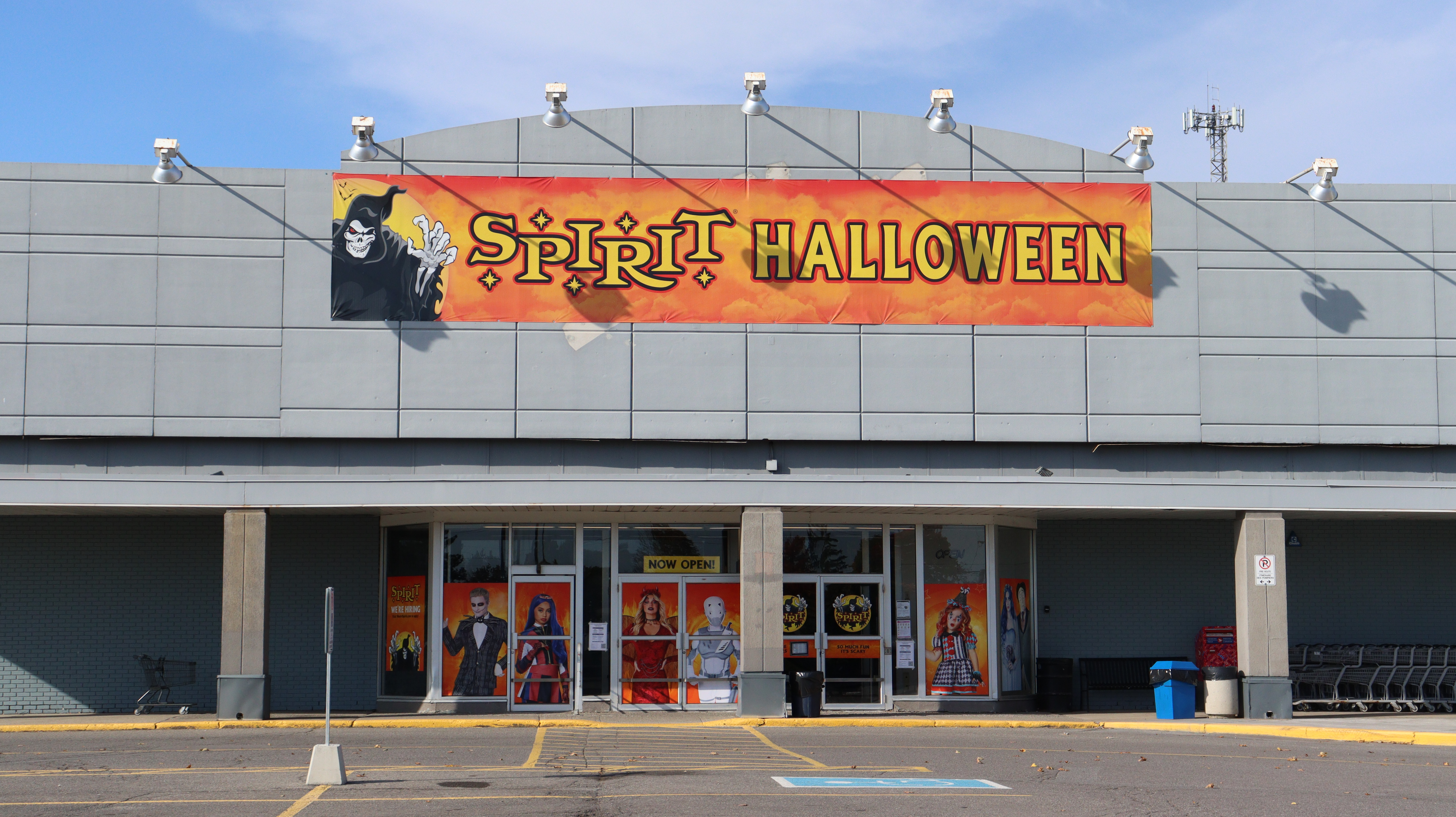
- A Spirit Halloween store in a former Zellers in Ottawa, Ontario
- Type: Subsidiary
- Founded: 1983; 43 years ago
- Founder: Joseph Marver
- Headquarters: Egg Harbor Township, New Jersey, U.S.
- Number of locations: 1,600+ (only during autumn)
- Area served: United States, Canada
- Products: Decorations; Costumes; Masks; Makeup
- Parent: Spencer Gifts
- Subsidiaries: Spirit Christmas
- Website: www.spirithalloween.com

Spirit Halloween Superstores, LLC is an American seasonal retailer that supplies Halloween products and is the United States' largest retailer of such products. It is currently owned by Spencer's Gifts. It was founded in 1983 and began in the Castro Valley "Village Shopping Center" in the San Francisco East Bay Area, California, and has its headquarters in Egg Harbor Township, New Jersey. In 1999, the store had 60 seasonal locations. By 2020, the number of stores had grown to over 1,400 locations.

== Business operations ==
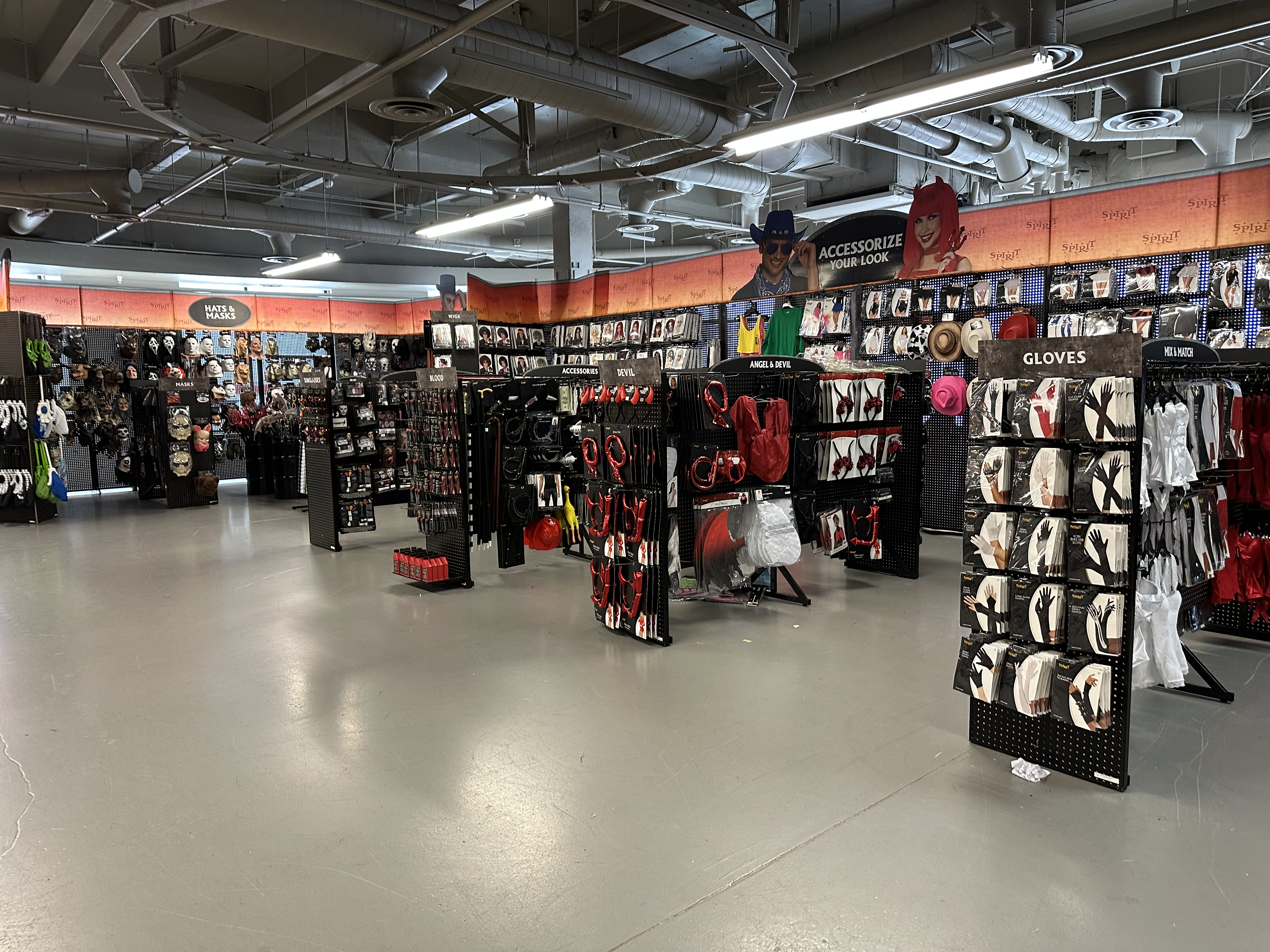
The interior of a Spirit Halloween location, showcasing various Halloween costumes and accessories for sale

During the Halloween season, Spirit operates over 1,600 store locations in North America. The Spirit Halloween website is open year-round, offering its in-store products online. The store carries décor manufactured by Gemmy Industries, Tekky Design, YJ, Seasonal Visions International, Crazy Create, NewRaySun, Party Time Latex Art And Crafts Factory, Tailuxe Artware, Seasons USA, Pan Asian Creations, and more. Many decorations are exclusive to Spirit.

In early summer, Spirit Halloween typically puts out teaser videos on social media and YouTube to create excitement for new items. A few days later, the videos are followed by another one officially revealing and announcing the item.

The retailer makes use of vacant retail space. The stores typically operate for 60 to 90 days, opening sometime in early to mid-August and usually closing two or three days after Halloween.

== History ==
Joe Marver created the Spirit Halloween business model, a pop-up store catering to Halloween revelers. A dress retailer, he replaced his store's usual merchandise with Halloween items in 1983 and named the store after his Spirit Women's Discount Apparel business. The following year, he opened the first year-round location in the Castro Valley Village Shopping Center in 1984. He grew Spirit Halloween to 60 seasonal stores nationwide before it was acquired by Spencer's Gifts in 1999. His approach to short-term leases, locations, and the stocking of widely varied merchandise was novel in the Halloween retail sector.

Spirit Halloween began selling items on its website in 2005. By 2006, it operated 434 temporary stores in 46 states. In October 2016, a store in Nebraska removed Native American costumes after the state's Indigenous community said they were irreverent to their culture. However, the corporate office ordered the costumes put back on the shelves, prompting a wider debate on cultural appropriation.

On October 21, 2016, Health Canada recalled eight products from Spirit Halloween for fire hazards and choking hazards. Despite promising to cease sales, 23 of its stores continued to sell products that had been recalled when Health Canada visited 45 stores across Canada.

In 2020, amidst the COVID-19 pandemic, the company opened 1,400 stores. Halloween sales are consistently solid even in uncertain economic times.

In 2022 and the following years, memes inspired by Spirit Halloween went viral on social media. The hashtag #SpiritHalloweenMeme was used to aggregate these memes. Some of these memes feature the packaging for costumes sold at Spirit, which is used as a template for commenting on people's clothes and personality—while others reference the fact that Spirit Halloween often sets up stores at the sites of former big-box retailers, including those that have closed as part of the retail apocalypse.

Spirit Halloween serves a Halloween consumer market estimated at $8.4 billion yearly, according to the National Retail Federation.

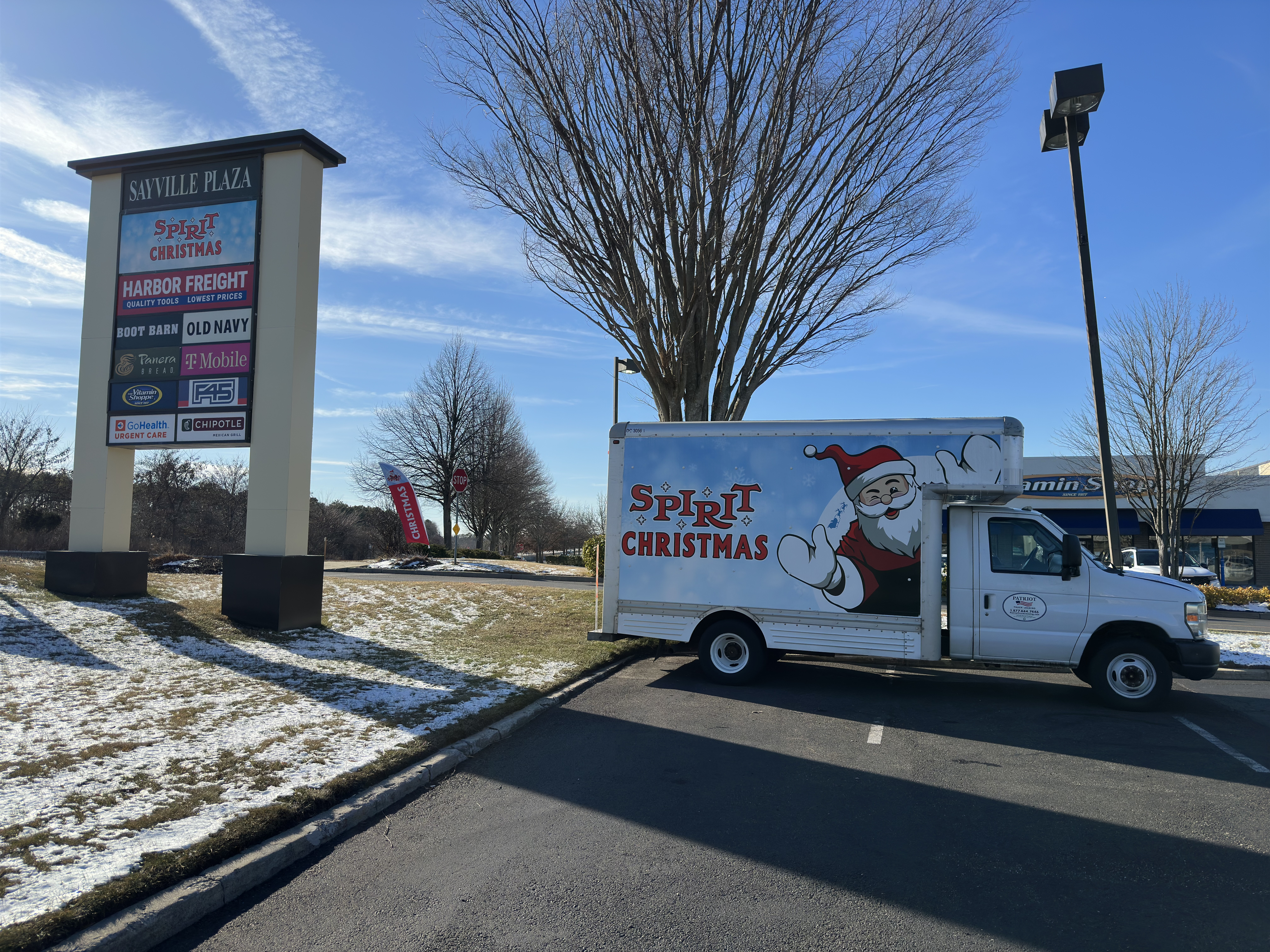
A van advertising one of the eight locations, in Bohemia, New York.

== Spirit Christmas ==
Prior to 2024, Spirit Halloween had occasionally piloted Christmas stores using a similar pop-up retail concept, once in 1990 prior to the Spencer's acquisition, and again in 2005 and 2006.

In October 2024, Spirit Halloween announced that it would run a regional pilot of Spirit Christmas stores in the Northeastern United States, opening 10 locations at sites in Connecticut, New York, New Jersey, Massachusetts, and Pennsylvania. Some of these sites transitioned from having been Spirit Halloween locations. In 2025, Spirit Christmas was expanded to 30 locations, adding locations in the Great Lakes region.

== Spirit of Children ==
In 2006, Spirit launched a program called Spirit of Children to raise money in-store for children's hospitals. The program annually celebrates Halloween at hospital locations, supplying costumes and decorations for the events. Since 2007, Spirit of Children has raised over $29 million in donations.

== Film ==
On April 11, 2022, it was announced that a film adaptation starring Christopher Lloyd and Rachael Leigh Cook was in development, with Strike Back Studios, Hideout Pictures, Particular Crowd and Film Mode Entertainment as co-producers, David Boag directing in his feature directorial debut, and Billie Bates writing. On July 31, 2022, the first teaser was released. The film was shot in Rome, Georgia, and Nashville, Tennessee. The film was released theatrically on September 30, 2022, before being released on video-on-demand (VOD) platforms on October 11, 2022.

== Gallery ==
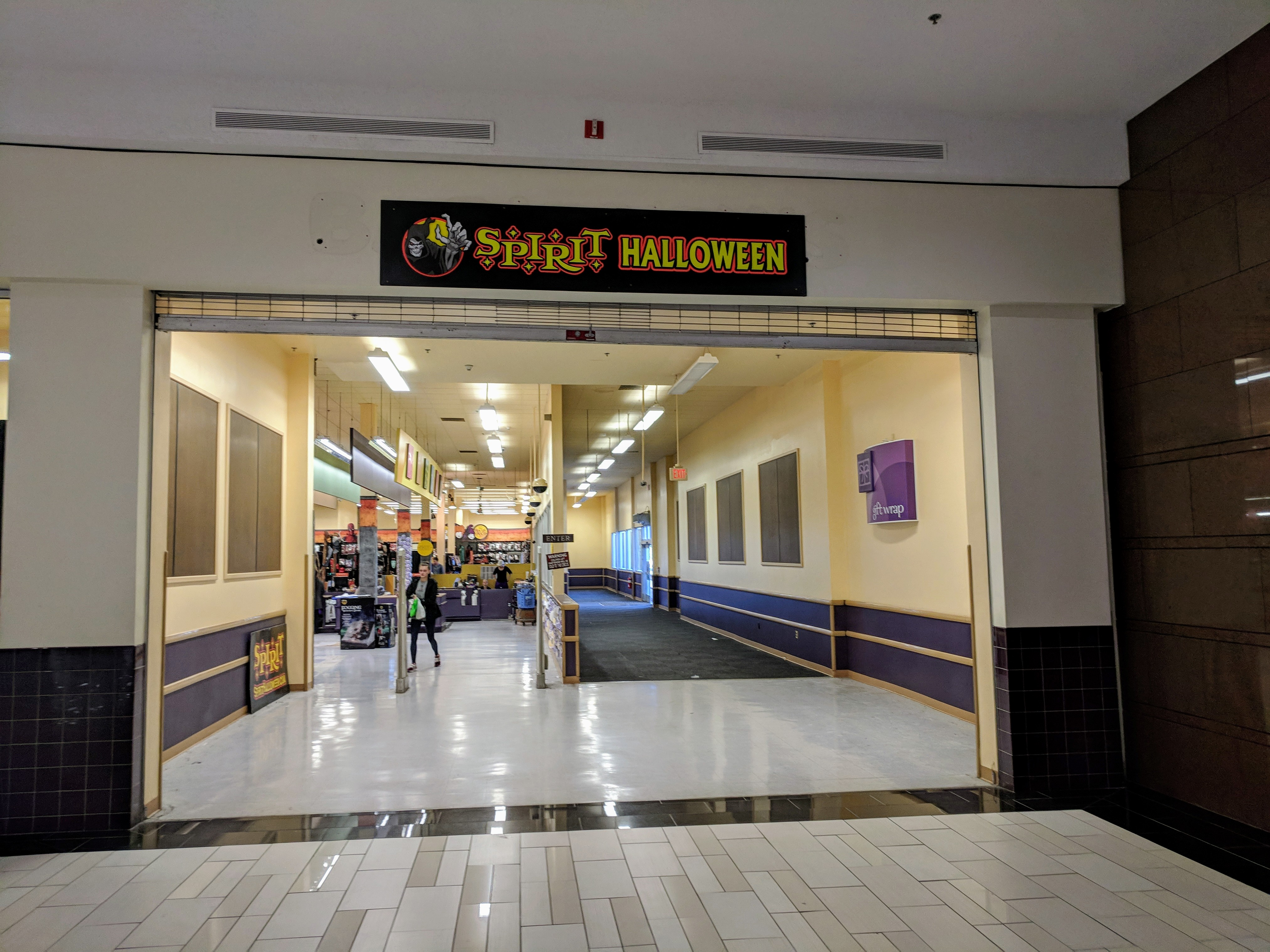
Former Babies "R" Us, Holyoke Mall, Holyoke, Massachusetts.

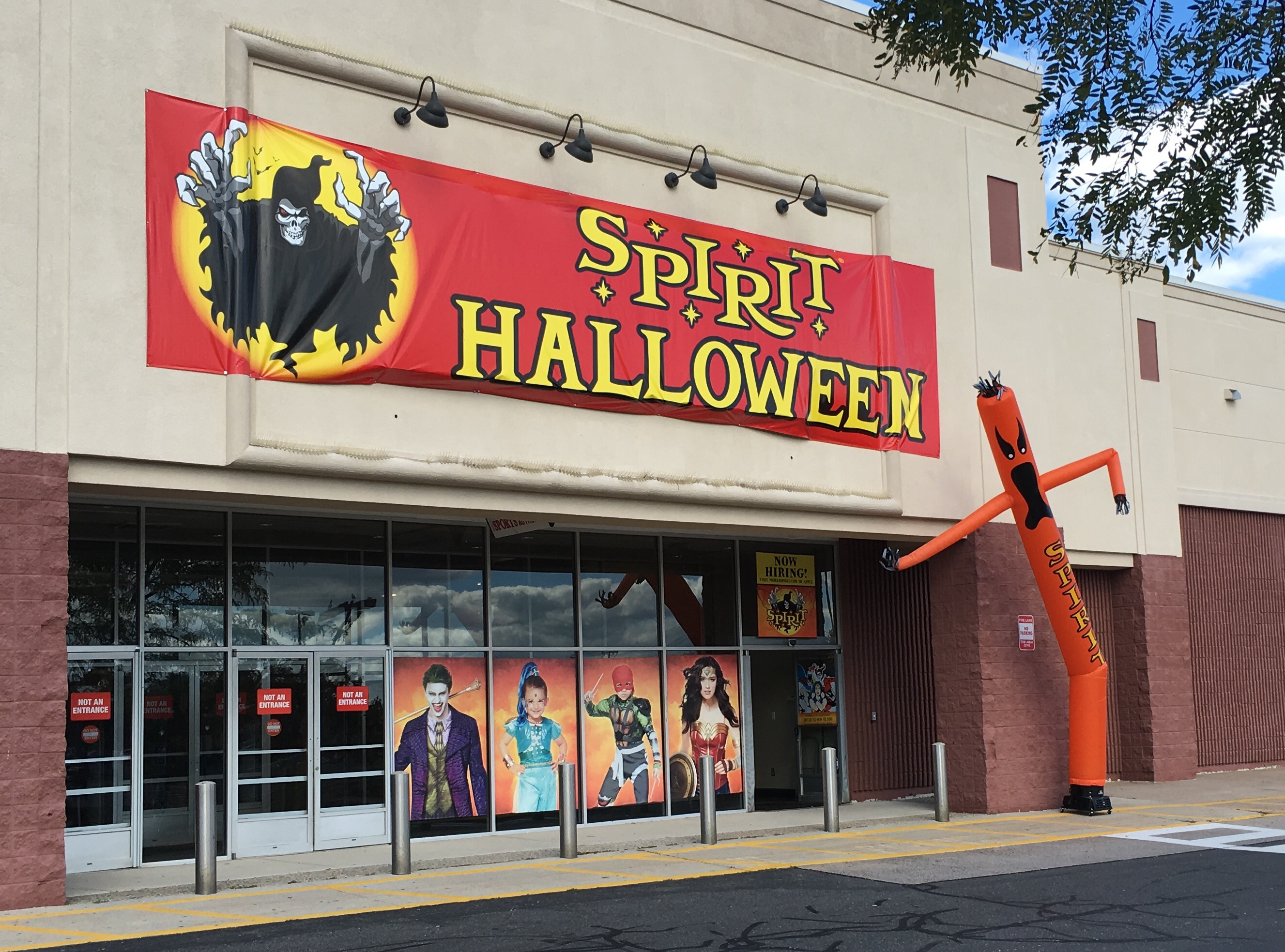
Former Sports Authority, Farmington, Connecticut

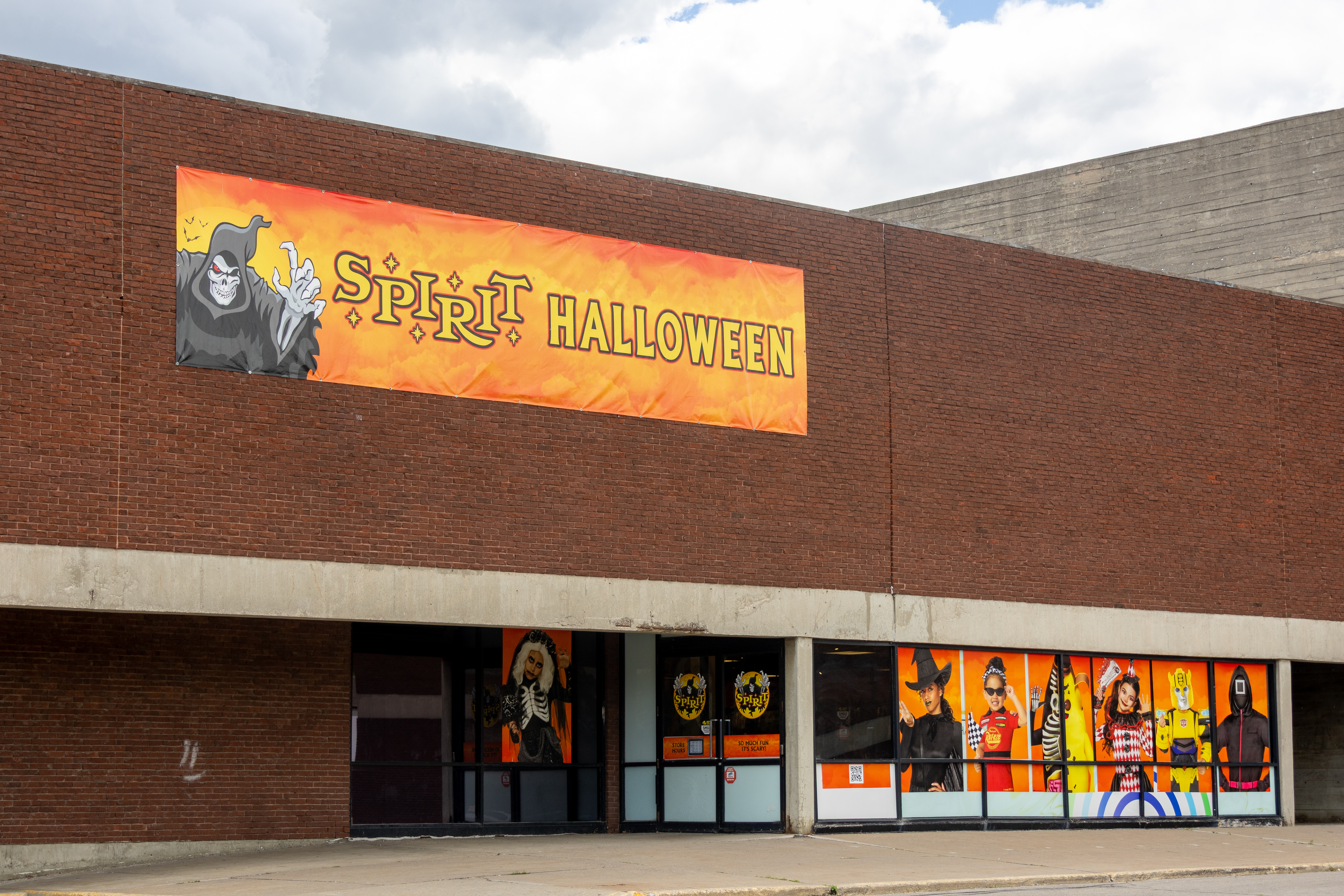
Former Sears building at the Oshawa Centre in Oshawa, Ontario, Canada

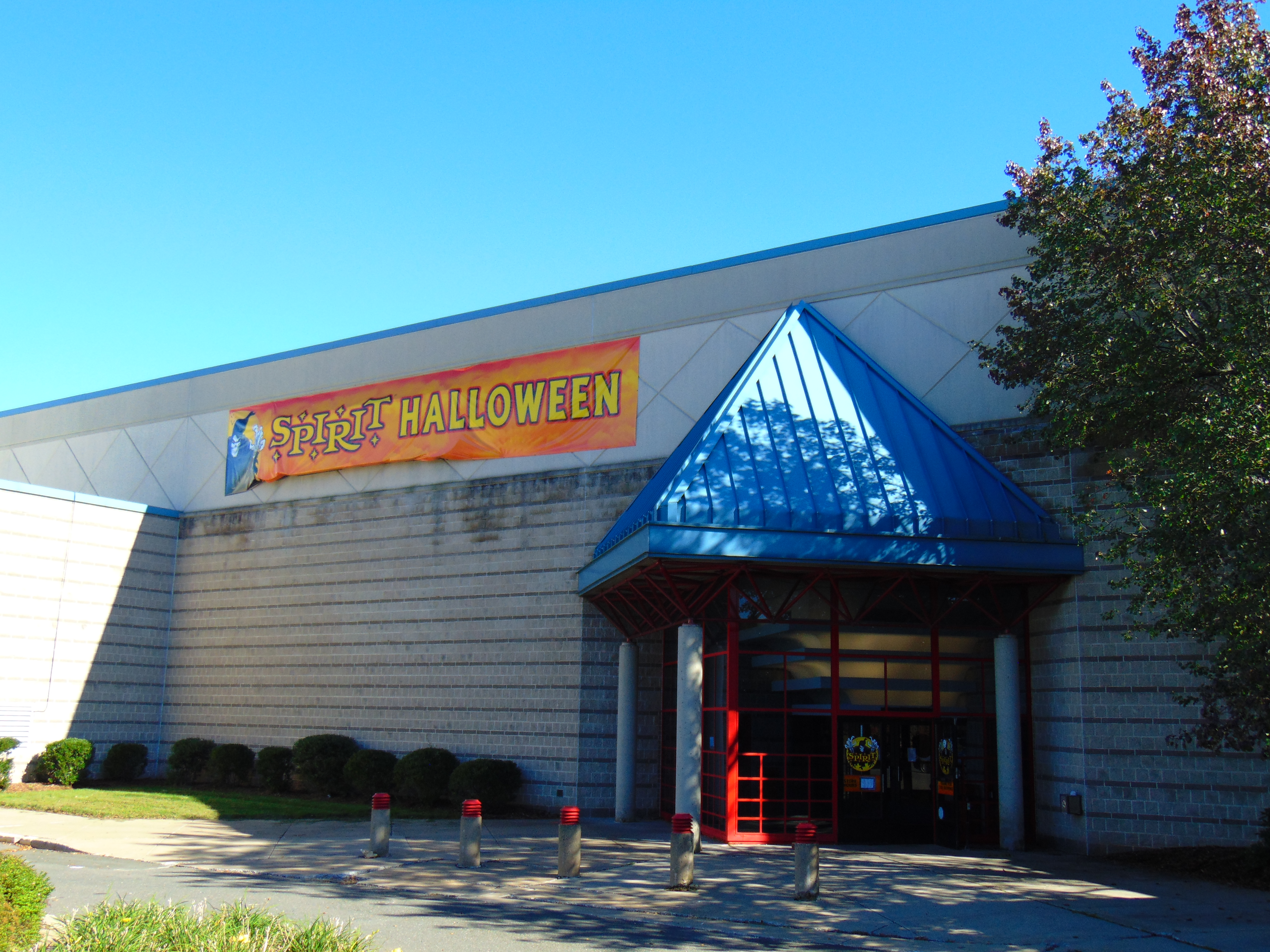
Former Sears at Buckland Hills Mall

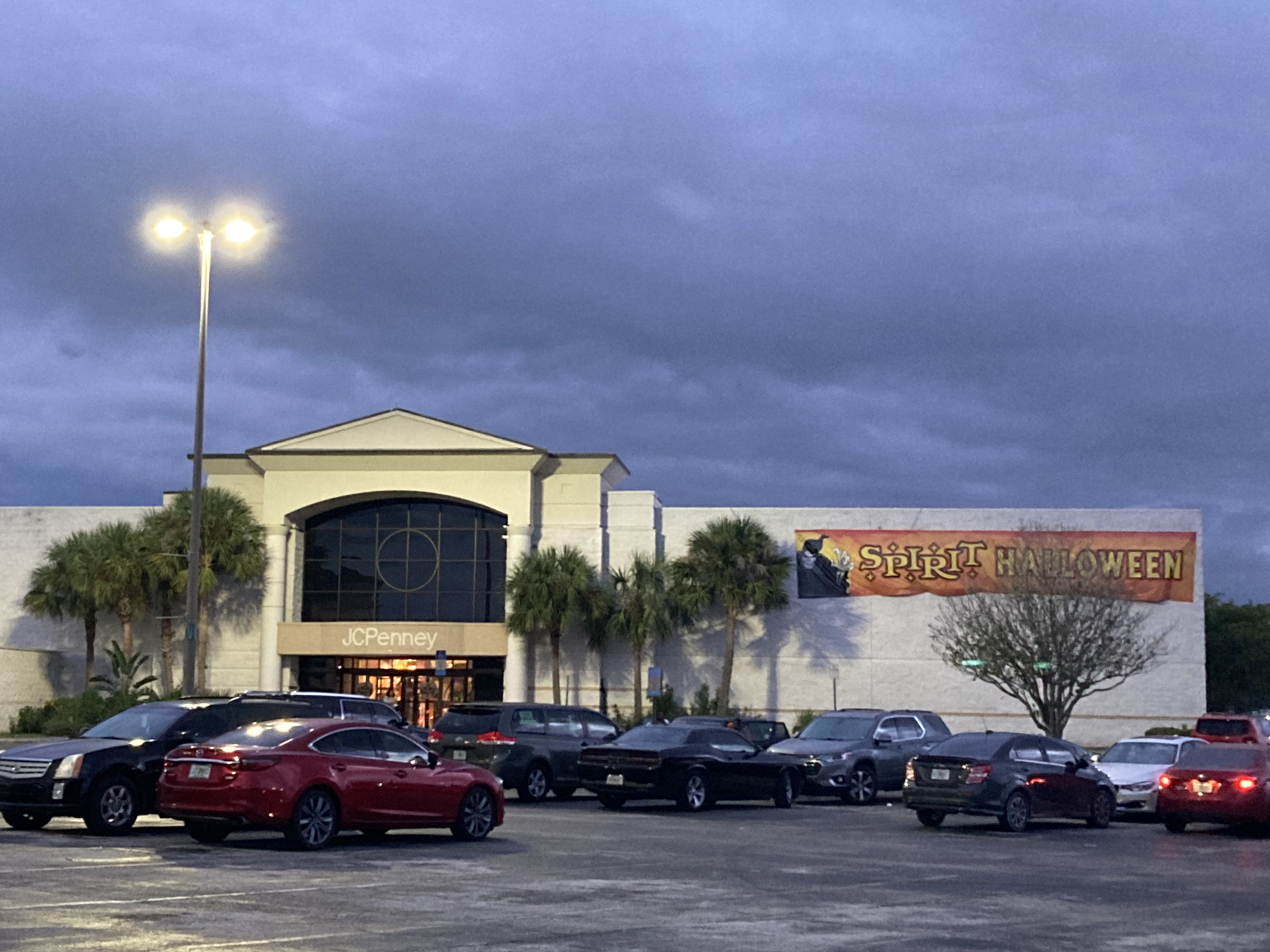
Former JCPenney at Eagle Ridge Mall in Lake Wales, Florida

Former Toys "R" Us Canada on Merivale Road, Ottawa, Ontario, Canada

== See also ==
- Spencer Gifts
