= Egg Harbor Township Nature Reserve =

Nature preserve in Egg Harbor Township, New Jersey, United States

Coordinates: 39.364°N 74.650°W

The Egg Harbor Township Nature Reserve is a 220-acre nature preserve located in Egg Harbor Township, New Jersey. The reserve features an arboretum, 6 miles of hiking trails, and a lake used for fishing and kayaking.

The location was formerly a mining pit that provided gravel for the construction of Atlantic City High School. It was converted to a park in 2013.

The reserve is used for various events. In 2017, the reserve hosted their Turkey Trot 5k run and 1 miler walk. It hosted a two day art exhibit in both 2016 and 2017.
