= Egg Harbor Township High School =

High school in Atlantic County, New Jersey, United States

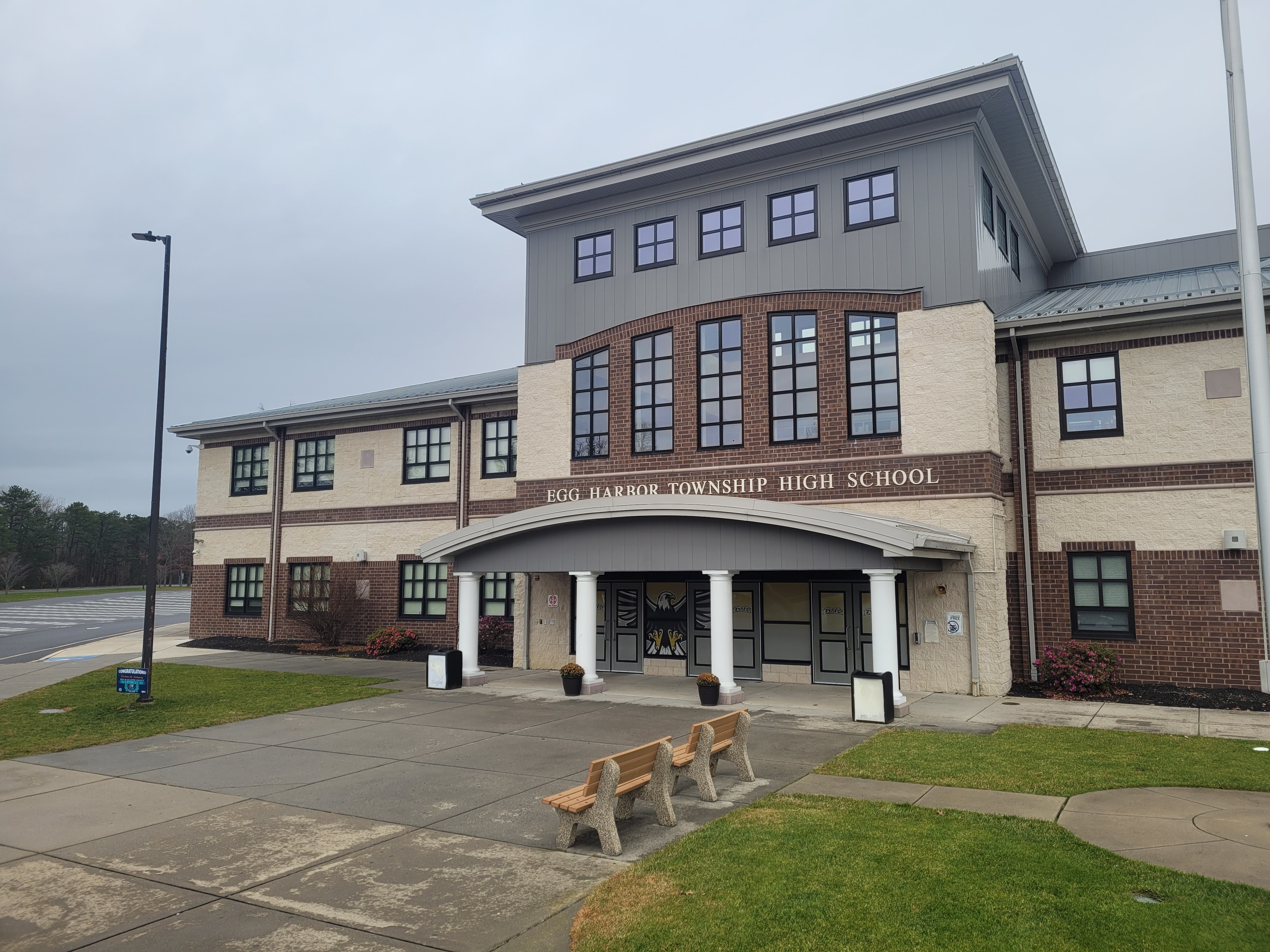

Location
- 24 High School Drive; Egg Harbor Township, Atlantic County, New Jersey 08234; United States; 39.393799°N 74.627937°W

Information
- Type: Public high school
- Motto: Embrace, Engage, Educate
- Established: September 1983
- School district: Egg Harbor Township Schools
- NCES School ID: 340456005961
- Principal: Jacki Carugno
- Faculty: 204.5 FTEs
- Grades: 9-12
- Enrollment: 2,279 (as of 2024–25)
- Student to teacher ratio: 11.1:1
- Colors: Silver and Black
- Athletics conference: Cape-Atlantic League (general); West Jersey Football League (football)
- Team name: Eagles
- Yearbook: Aquila
- Website: hs.eht.k12.nj.us

Egg Harbor Township High School is a comprehensive community public high school that serves students in ninth through twelfth grades from Egg Harbor Township in Atlantic County, in the U.S. state of New Jersey, operating as the lone high school of the Egg Harbor Township Schools district.

As of the 2024–25 school year, the school had an enrollment of 2,279 students and 204.5 classroom teachers (on an FTE basis), for a student–teacher ratio of 11.1:1. There were 951 students (41.7% of enrollment) eligible for free lunch and 224 (9.8% of students) eligible for reduced-cost lunch.

== Awards, recognition, and rankings ==
The school was the 173rd-ranked public high school in New Jersey out of 339 schools statewide in New Jersey Monthly magazine's September 2014 cover story on the state's "Top Public High Schools", using a new ranking methodology. The school had been ranked 213th in the state of 328 schools in 2012, after being ranked 227th in 2010 out of 322 schools listed. The magazine ranked the school 217th in 2008 out of 316 schools. The school was ranked 154th in the magazine's September 2006 issue, which surveyed 316 schools across the state. Schooldigger.com ranked the school 268th out of 376 public high schools statewide in its 2010 rankings (a decrease of 47 positions from the 2009 rank) which were based on the combined percentage of students classified as proficient or above proficient on the language arts literacy and mathematics components of the High School Proficiency Assessment (HSPA).

The school yearbook received a Columbia Scholastic Press Association Gold Medal in 2000.

== Curriculum ==
The school offers Advanced Placement (AP) courses in AP Computer Science A, AP English Language and Composition, AP English Literature and Composition, AP French Language, AP German Language, AP Spanish Language, AP United States History, AP World History, AP United States Government and Politics, AP Psychology, AP Biology, AP Chemistry, AP Physics B, AP Physics C, AP Calculus AB, AP Calculus BC, AP Statistics, AP Latin: Vergil, AP Music Theory, AP Microeconomics and AP Macroeconomics.

The school offers a business curriculum, including classes such as Introduction to Business and College Accounting, as part of the school's Academy of Law and Business.

== Athletics ==
The Egg Harbor Township High School Eagles compete in the Atlantic Division of the Cape-Atlantic League, an athletic conference comprised of both parochial and public high schools located in Atlantic, Cape May, Cumberland, and Gloucester counties, operating under the aegis of the New Jersey State Interscholastic Athletic Association (NJSIAA). With 1,763 students in grades 10–12, the school was classified by the NJSIAA for the 2019–20 school year as Group IV for most athletic competition purposes, which included schools with an enrollment of 1,060 to 5,049 students in that grade range. The football team competes in the United Division of the 94-team West Jersey Football League superconference and was classified by the NJSIAA as Group V South for football for 2024–2026, which included schools with 1,333 to 2,324 students.

Egg Harbor Township has the following interscholastic athletic teams:

Fall: Cheerleading, Boys' & Girls' Cross country, Field hockey, Football, Boys' & Girls' Soccer, Girls' Volleyball, Girls' Tennis.

Winter: Cheerleading, Boys' & Girls' Basketball, Boys' & Girls' Swimming, Boys' & Girls' Diving, Boys' & Girls' Indoor Track & Field, Wrestling.

Spring: Baseball, Boys' & Girls' Crew (5 S.R.A.A. Gold National Championships), Golf, Boys' & Girls' Lacrosse, Softball, Boys' Tennis, Boys' & Girls' Outdoor Track & Field.

The 1992 girls' basketball team won the Group III state championship, defeating Pascack Valley High School by a score of 40–31 in the tournament final played at Monmouth College and entered the Tournament of Champions as the fifth seed, winning in the quarterfinals by 51–40 against fourth-ranked Jefferson Township High School and winning the semis 50–48 in overtime against top-seeded St. John Vianney High School before losing in the finals at the Meadowlands Arena by a score of 51–45 against second-seed St. Peter the Apostle High School, to finish the season with a record of 29–5.

The football team has won the South Jersey Group III state sectional championships in both 1992 and 1993. The team won the South Jersey Group III sectional title in 1992 with a 14–0 win in the championship game against previously undefeated Lacey Township High School. The 1983 team finished the season with an 8–2 record and repeated as South Jersey Group III champion with a 19–14 win against Lacey Township. The 2009 team captured the Cape Atlantic League title and had been undefeated until they lost by a score of 14–0 to Cherokee High School in the South Jersey Group IV state sectional title game, ending the season with a record of 11–1.

The boys' wrestling team won the South Jersey Group III state sectional championship in 2001.

The boys' track team won the indoor state championship in Group IV in 2013.

The softball team had a 47–2 record over the 2016 and 2017 seasons, capturing the Group IV state championship in 2017, the South Jersey Group IV state sectional championship in 2016 and 2017, and the Cape Atlantic League conference championship in 2016 and 2017. In 2017, the team won the Group IV state championship, the program's first, with a 2–1 win against North Hunterdon High School in the tournament final. The team advanced to the inaugural New Jersey State Interscholastic Athletic Association softball Tournament of Champions as the top seed, falling to Immaculate Conception High School by a score of 13–1 in the semifinal round.

The girls’ spring / outdoor track and field team won the NJSIAA Group IV state championships in 2021.

== Marching band ==
The school's marching band was Tournament of Bands Chapter One Champion in 1988 (Group 1) and State Champion 2006 (Group 4). In 2008, the band was overall Cavalcade of Bands State Champion throughout all groups. In 2009, the band won state champions and the percussion section won Best Percussion in the Cavalcade of Bands Circuit in the Yankee Conference (group 4). In 2010, the band won the captions for Best Percussion, Best Visual, and Best Music. In 2011.

== Administration ==
The school's principal is Jacki Carugno. Her administrative team includes four assistant principals, one assigned to each grade.

== Notable alumni ==
- Esther Choi (born 1985), chef, hotel owner and television personality, best known for her appearances on the Food Network
- Cameron Flukey (born 2005), college baseball pitcher for the Coastal Carolina Chanticleers
- Ryan Lancaster (born 1985), professional basketball player
