= Vivendi Universal Entertainment =

Vivendi Universal's entertainment division (2000–2004)

- Type: Subsidiary
- Industry: Media; Entertainment
- Founded: December 11, 2000; 25 years ago
- Defunct: May 11, 2004; 22 years ago
- Fate: Merged with NBC in 2004 to form NBCUniversal
- Headquarters: 100 Universal City Plaza, Universal City, California, United States
- Area served: Worldwide
- Key people: Barry Diller (COO)
- Products: Amusement parks; Films; Music; Television shows; Video games; Web portals
- Brands: Universal Music Group; Universal Animation Studios; Vivendi Universal Games; Universal Interactive; Universal Orlando; Universal Pictures; Universal Pictures Home Entertainment; Universal Studios Hollywood; Universal Studios Japan; Universal Studios Singapore; Universal Television
- Services: Broadcasting; Licensing; Publishing; Television
- Revenue: ▼US$5.02 billion (2003)
- Number of employees: 14,187 (2003)
- Parent: Vivendi Universal
- Divisions: Universal Studios; Universal Parks & Resorts; Universal Music Group; Vivendi Universal Games; USA Network; Canal+ Group; Spencer Gifts

Evolution of Comcast
- 1909: Independent Moving Pictures was founded by Carl Laemmle as the predecessor to Universal
- 1912: Universal Studios Hollywood was founded after Independent Moving merged with several smaller film studios
- 1915: Universal City, California, was established as the entertainment district for the Universal Studios Lot.
- 1924: MCA Inc. was founded by Jules Stein as a talent agency to book musicians
- 1926: RCA Corporation launched the NBC Radio Network, and by 1939, NBC began broadcasting on television.
- 1934: Decca Records America was established and would later grow to become Universal Music Group
- 1946: William Goetz and Leo Spitz began managing Universal Pictures, after merging International Pictures
- 1952: Decca Records America acquired a controlling stake in Universal Pictures
- 1958: MCA acquired the Universal Studios film lot and later purchased Decca Records America, and Universal Pictures in 1962
- 1963: Comcast was founded as American Cable Systems by Ralph J. Roberts
- 1973: Decca Records America is retired as a brand and renamed to MCA Records
- 1986: General Electric acquired RCA Corp and dissolved the company while retaining ownership of NBC
- 1990: Panasonic acquired a Controlling interest in MCA, but sold it to Seagram within five years after growing costs
- 1998: MCA Records acquired Polygram N.V. from Philips and was renamed to Universal Music Group
- 2000: Seagram Entertainment was sold to Vivendi and merged with StudioCanal to become Vivendi Universal
- 2002: NBC acquired Telemundo while Comcast acquired AT&T Broadband
- 2004: Vivendi Universal was consolidated with General Electric's wholly owned NBC to form NBCUniversal, while Universal Music Group was separated
- 2013: Comcast closed its acquisition of NBCUniversal from General Electric
- 2018: Sky Group was acquired from 21st Century Fox after a bidding war
- 2020: Peacock was launched
- 2026: Majority of NBCU's cable networks were spun off into another company named Versant, while Comcast later announced it would spin-off NBCUniversal and Sky into a separate company

Vivendi Universal Entertainment LLLP (VUE) was an American group, an 86% subsidiary of the French conglomerate Vivendi Universal, bringing together Vivendi Universal's film (Universal Studios), television (USA Network, Sci-Fi, etc.), and theme park businesses, making it the world's second-largest communications and media company.

Created in 2000 as a result of Vivendi purchasing both Seagram and Canal+, VUE was one of the divisions of Vivendi Universal, a global group active in many areas such as music with Universal Music Group, film with Universal Pictures and StudioCanal, telecommunications with Cegetel and SFR, and publishing with Vivendi Universal Publishing (literature, textbooks, press, video games; now Editis).

In 2002, with the acquisition of USA Networks, Vivendi Universal Entertainment's headquarters moved from Paris to 100 Universal City Plaza, Universal City, California.

== History ==
=== 2000: merger of Vivendi and Seagram ===
Vivendi Universal Entertainment is the result of the 2000 merger of Seagram's Universal activities (excluding music) and the Canal+ Group, which includes the Canal+ channel, Canalsatellite, and StudioCanal, contributed by Vivendi.

In 2002, Vivendi Universal acquired the entertainment activities of the American group InterActiveCorp (namely the USA Network and the Sci-Fi channel) and integrated them into Vivendi Universal Entertainment and a new holding company named “Vivendi Universal Entertainment LLLP” domiciled in the United States.

On May 30, 2003, Vivendi Universal Entertainment sold Spencer Gifts, a chain of gift and novelty stores located in the United States, Canada, and the United Kingdom, to American investment funds Gordon Brothers Group and Palladin Capital Group for approximately $100 million.

=== 2004: NBCUniversal merger ===
In May 2004, Vivendi Universal sold Vivendi Universal Entertainment to General Electric, owner of NBC, which integrated it into the new NBCUniversal media group in exchange for a 20% stake. Vivendi Universal retained Universal Music Group and Canal+.

==== Sale of remaining residual interest (2011) ====
Vivendi Universal's stake was finally sold to General Electric in two stages at the end of 2010 and beginning of 2011. This group then sold 51% of NBCUniversal to Comcast, which integrated its own television channels into the company.

=== Post-merger re-incorporation ===
After the 2004 merger between National Broadcasting Company, Inc. & Vivendi Universal Entertainment LLLP that created NBC Universal, Inc. (formerly National Broadcasting Company, Inc.), Vivendi Universal Entertainment itself would go through a re-incorporation to "Universal City Studios Productions LLLP" (which would take on the business name of "NBCUniversal Television Distribution").

== Organization ==
In 2004, Vivendi Universal Entertainment consisted of:

- Universal Studios
  - Universal Pictures
  - Focus Features
  - United International Pictures
  - Universal Studios Home Video
- Universal Television
- Universal Parks & Resorts
- Universal Music Group
- Vivendi Universal Games
  - Universal Interactive
- Canal+ Group
- Spencer Gifts
