= Spencer Gifts =

American retail holding company

Spencer Spirit Holdings, Inc.

- A Spencer's outlet at the Northridge Fashion Center in Los Angeles, California
- Trade name: Spencer's
- Type: Private
- Industry: Retail
- Founded: June 19, 1947; 79 years ago, in Easton, Pennsylvania, U.S.
- Founder: Max Spencer Adler
- Headquarters: Egg Harbor Township, New Jersey, U.S.
- Number of locations: Over 670
- Area served: United States Canada
- Key people: Steven Silverstein (CEO)
- Owners: MCA Inc. (1967–1996); Seagram (1996–2001); Vivendi Universal/Vivendi Universal Entertainment (2001–2003); ACON Investments (2007–2015)
- Subsidiaries: Spirit Halloween; Hot Topic; BoxLunch
- Website: spencersonline.com

Spencer Spirit Holdings, Inc. is an American retail company. Based in Egg Harbor Township, New Jersey, the company primarily operates Spencer's Gifts—a chain of stores that sells novelty and gag items, clothing, accessories, as well as body jewelry, sex toys, and fantasy and horror items. The chain operates 600 locations in malls across the United States and Canada.

The company also owns Spirit Halloween, a chain of seasonal pop-up stores dedicated to Halloween costumes and decor.

== History ==
Spencer Gifts was founded in 1947 in Easton, Pennsylvania, by Max Spencer Adler (1897–1979) as a mail-order catalog that sold an assortment of novelty merchandise. The company moved all mail order and fulfillment operations to Atlantic City, New Jersey. In 1960, Max's brother, Harry, who had been with the company since 1947, sold his shares to his brother and left the company.

In 1963, Spencer Gifts opened its first retail store in the Cherry Hill Mall in Cherry Hill, New Jersey, where it operates to this day.

By 1967, after opening approximately 450 stores under the name Spencer Gifts, Adler sold Spencer Gifts to entertainment conglomerate MCA, a predecessor to the modern NBC Universal company. In 2003, Spencer's Gifts was completely rebranded after being put under new management, and with the change become known only as just Spencer's.

In 1990, Spencer Gifts closed its mail-order catalog division.

In 1993 and 1996, respectively, Spencer Gifts acquired the DAPY line of stores and opened its first GLOW! store. The DAPY and GLOW! trademarks were retired sometime before 2007. Around 2021, both GLOW! and DAPY returned to business under a private entity, until July 2024 when GLOW! announced they would be closing down along with DAPY.

In 1995, Spencer Gifts began to operate Universal Studios stores as a subsidiary of its parent company. In 1997, Spencer Gifts opened its first store in Canada.

In 1999, Spencer's acquired Spirit Halloween, a seasonal retailer founded by Joseph Marver in 1983. At that time, the business had 60 temporary locations. Spirit's stores are only open for the two months leading up to Halloween, though it maintains a website year-round. The stores are generally operated out of the spaces of recently vacated businesses. As of 2013, Spirit had over 1,000 annual locations, which comprised about half of Spencer's annual revenue of $250 million.

In 2000, Spencer's expanded into the United Kingdom. The chain opened up to 14 stores in the United Kingdom before closing them sometime in the mid-2000s.

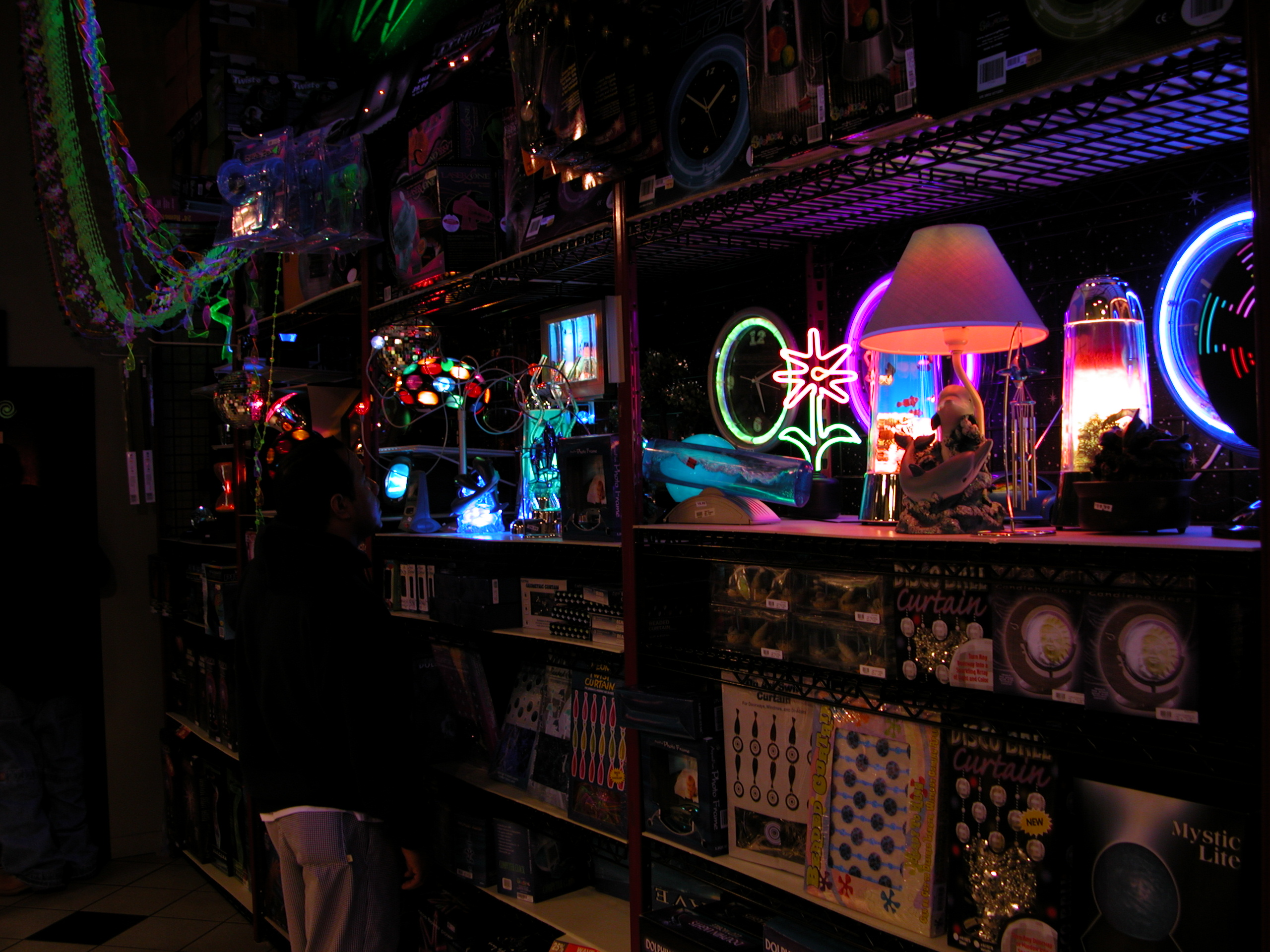
Typical merchandise at a Spencer's Gift shop

In 2001, Vivendi acquired Universal Studios and rebranded the entire organization as Vivendi Universal Entertainment. Less than two years later, in 2003, GB Palladin, a joint venture between Gordon Brothers Group and Palladin Capital Group, acquired Spencer Gifts from Vivendi, around the same time Vivendi was preparing to sell the majority of its shares of Universal Studios to General Electric's NBC division. As a result of the sale, Steven Silverstein became Spencer Gifts' CEO and also the CEO and president of Spirit Halloween.

In fall 2004, Spencer's began redesigning its stores.

In 2006, Spencer's began its "Spirit of Children" program, which raises donations through its Spirit Halloween stores and hosts Halloween parties in children's hospitals in Canada and the United States. Since 2007, the program has raised over $110 million for over 130 children's hospitals.

ACON Investments acquired the company in 2007 and sold it to Spencer's management in 2015.

On August 6, 2026, Spencer Spirit Holdings announced that it would acquire its long-time competitor Hot Topic from Sycamore Partners for an undisclosed amount, pending regulatory approval. Hot Topic will operate as an independent subsidiary post-acquisition, retaining its California offices and retail banners; the combined company will have over 3,000 retail locations in North America.

== Legal issues ==
In 1962, Spencer Gifts was found by the Federal Trade Commission (FTC) to have violated the Federal Trade Commission Act by making misleading statements in advertising its "Reduce-Eze" girdles and ordered to cease making false claims. The girdles were advertised with statements such as "Slim 4 Inches Without Diet" and "Trims 4 Inches Off Your Figure".

In 1969, Spencer Gifts was found by the FTC to, through the use of words like "stone", "birthstone", and "gold", have misrepresented its jewelry products. As its jewelry did not contain any "genuine precious or semiprecious stones", nor was its metal 24 karat gold, Spencer Gifts was ordered to stop use of deceptive statements in the promotion of its jewelry.

In 1970, Spencer Gifts was found by the FTC to have misled its customers as to the efficacy of its "non-prescription magnifying spectacles" by failing to disclose that correction of vision defects is limited to older persons who do not have any eye diseases, like astigmatism, but only need "simple magnifying or reducing lenses". The FTC ordered the retailer to cease the use of advertisements that misrepresented the quality of its optical products.

== Controversies ==
In 1989, the American-Arab Anti-Discrimination Committee (ADC) mailed thousands of pamphlets to Arab-Americans across the United States to campaign against Spencer's "sheik" and "Arafat" Halloween masks, which were marketed as part of its "Fright Stuff" line of products. The pamphlet featured a picture of the "sheik" mask and claimed that it "was the only ethnic one in the product line and being marketed alongside traditional monster masks reinforced the notion Arab people are scary." Spencer Gifts pulled the two masks from its stores in October following a "three-day protest and telephone campaign" by the ADC, but decided later that month to place the masks back on sale, prompting the ADC to boycott and picket Spencer's stores. In a letter to ADC spokesperson Faris Bouhafa, Spencer's general counsel Ronald Mangel said that "after re-reviewing the 'Sheik' and 'Arafat' masks and discussing the look of the masks with others", Spencer's president John Hacala decided to reverse the earlier decision and place the masks back in stores. "We will not reorder the masks for next year," the letter added.

Spencer Gifts has been criticized for allowing children access to adult toys and other explicit products. While adults-only products are ostensibly kept in areas off-limits to children, there have been several instances where that is not the case. In one instance, police seized adult materials from the Spencer Gifts in Rapid City, South Dakota as "possible evidence for the national retailer's failure to register as an adult-oriented business".

In February 2014, the Ancient Order of Hibernians, the largest Irish organization in the United States, called on Spencer's to cease the sale of merchandise it felt propagated stereotypes about Irish Americans, such as a T-shirt with the slogan "F*** me I'm Irish" and a hat sporting the phrase "Irish Girl Wasted". AOH National Anti-Defamation Chairman Neil Cosgrove protested, "We note that Spencer's Gifts is a recidivist when it comes to denigrating the heritage and culture of Irish Americans. Spencer's St. Pat's merchandise seems to plumb new lows with each year."
