= Ryan Lancaster =

American basketball player

Ryan Lancaster (born October 5, 1985) is an American former professional basketball player who most recently played with InderValle, of Colombia's Copa Federacion, for the 2011–2012 season. He plays both the shooting guard and point guard positions and is 1.93 m (6 ft 4 in) in height. He played college basketball for four years at Holy Family University. He played the 2009–2010 season with Norwegian BLNO club Gimle, and the 2008–09 season with Germany Pro A club TV Langen, before touring with the Washington Generals and Harlem Globetrotters.

== Early career ==
Lancaster was raised in Galloway Township, New Jersey. He enrolled his freshman year at Holy Spirit High School before transferring to Egg Harbor Township High School his sophomore year in 2002. Lancaster did not play a game for EHT until his junior year. Despite only playing in summer camps, Lancaster was recruited by several Division I colleges before he even played in a high school game. He was an all-conference selection for his only two years of high school basketball, and averaged over 23 points in his senior campaign.

== College career ==
Lancaster was recruited out of Egg Harbor Township High School by coach Alfred Johnson. During his four-year career, Lancaster was an all-conference selection three straight seasons. He earned All-CACC first team honors his senior season with Holy Family University in Philadelphia which reached the NCAA Tournament for the first time in school history. Lancaster is the all-time leading scorer at HFU with 1,636 career points.
