= Great Egg Harbor (disambiguation) =

Great Egg Harbor may refer to the following locations in the U.S. state of New Jersey:

- Great Egg Harbor River
- Great Egg Harbor Bay
- Great Egg Harbour Township, now known as Egg Harbor Township
- Great Egg Harbor Bridge, a toll bridge carrying the Garden State Parkway over the Great Egg Harbor River
