= New Jersey Route 157 =

State highway in New Jersey, US

Route 157
- North Shore Road
- Map of Route 157, which is highlighted in red

Route information
- Maintained by NJDOT
- Length: 0.91 mi (1,460 m)
- Existed: 1953–present

Major junctions
- South end: US 30 / CR 585 in Absecon
- North end: US 9 in Absecon

Location
- Country: United States
- State: New Jersey
- Counties: Atlantic

Highway system
- New Jersey State Highway Routes; Interstate; US; State; Scenic Byways
← Route 156	→ Route 158

Route 157 is a short state highway in the city of Absecon, New Jersey. The route runs for only 0.91 miles (1.46 km) as North Shore Road from an intersection with U.S. Route 30 (US 30), County Route 585 (CR 585) and Atlantic County Route 601 in the center of Absecon to an intersection with U.S. Route 9 in the northern portion of the city. The route is a former alignment of U.S. Route 9/State Highway Route 4 through Absecon, intersecting with State Highway Route 43 starting in the 1927 state highway renumbering. The route stayed on the alignment until 1930, when U.S. Route 9/Route 4 was bypassed to the west. The former alignment remained unnumbered until the 1953 state highway renumbering, when it was designated as Route 157.

== Route description ==
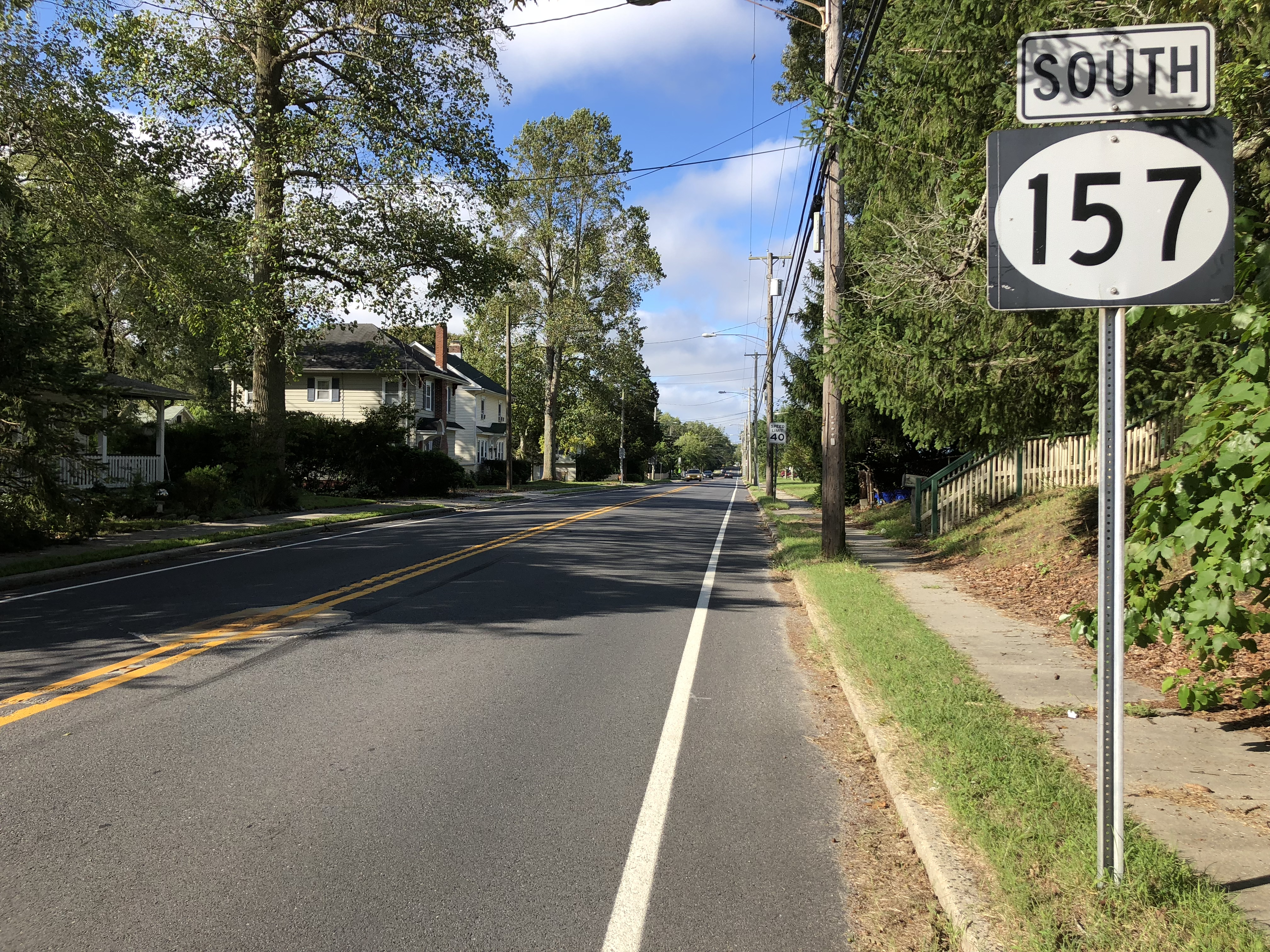
View south at the northern terminus of Route 157 at US 9 in Absecon

Route 157 begins at a large intersection with U.S. Route 30 (White Horse Pike), County Route 585 (South Shore Road), Atlantic County Route 601 (New Jersey Avenue) and Creek Road in the city of Absecon. The route heads northward along North Shore Road, passing through the local commercial districts of Absecon. Intersecting with Station Road (the highway connecting Route 157 to the Absecon train station), the route leaves the commercial district and enters the residential areas. There, Route 157 intersects with Atlantic County Route 634 (West Church Street). Route 157 continues northward, intersecting with local roads in a small patch of forestry. At an intersection with Faunce Landing Road, Route 157 turns to the northeast onto its final stretch. Continuing through the forestry, the highway intersects with several local roads and traverses near some residential homes. Still in Absecon, Route 157 becomes surrounded by residential homes, terminating at an intersection with U.S. Route 9 (Wyoming Avenue).

== History ==
Route 157 originates as an alignment of U.S. Route 9/State Highway Route 4 through Absecon (from an intersection with New Jersey Route 43). The route was originally designated in the 1927 renumbering as a state highway from Absecon to Paterson. In 1930, the route was extended southward to Cape May, New Jersey, and the alignment of current-day Route 157 was bypassed to the west. The former alignment of Route 4 was left unnumbered. Route 157 was designated to a previously unnumbered roadway and has remained unchanged since.

== Major intersections ==
The entire route is in Absecon, Atlantic County.

mi	km	Destinations	Notes
0.00	0.00	US 30 (White Horse Pike) / CR 585 south (South Shore Road) – Atlantic City, Hammonton	Southern terminus; northern terminus of CR 585
0.91	1.46	US 9 (Wyoming Avenue) – Cape May, Toms River	Northern terminus
1.000 mi = 1.609 km; 1.000 km = 0.621 mi

== See also ==
- New Jersey Route 166 – Former alignment of US 9 in Toms River
- New Jersey Route 167 – Former alignments of US 9 in Port Republic and Bass River Township
