= U.S. Route 9 in New Jersey =

Highway in New Jersey

U.S. Route 9
- US 9 mainline highlighted in red, currently unsigned Beesley's Point segment in blue

Route information
- Maintained by NJDOT, DRBA, NJTA, PANYNJ, and Cape May County
- Length: 166.80 mi (268.44 km)
- Existed: 1926–present
- Tourist routes: Pine Barrens Byway
- Restrictions: No trucks on the Pulaski Skyway

Major junctions
- South end: US 9 via the Cape May–Lewes Ferry in Lower Township
- US 40 / US 322 in Pleasantville; A.C. Expressway in Pleasantville; US 30 in Absecon; I-195 in Howell Township; G.S. Parkway / CR 616 in Woodbridge; US 1 in Woodbridge Township; I-278 in Linden; I-78 / US 22 / Route 21 in Newark; US 46 in Palisades Park; I-95 / N.J. Turnpike / US 9W / Route 4 in Fort Lee
- North end: I-95 / US 1-9 at the New York state line in Fort Lee

Location
- Country: United States
- State: New Jersey
- Counties: Cape May, Atlantic, Burlington, Ocean, Monmouth, Middlesex, Union, Essex, Hudson, Bergen

Highway system
- United States Numbered Highway System; List; Special; Divided; New Jersey State Highway Routes; Interstate; US; State; Scenic Byways
| ← Route 8 | → Route 9 |

U.S. Route 9 (US 9) is a United States Numbered Highway in the Mid-Atlantic region of the United States, running from Laurel, Delaware, to Champlain, New York. In New Jersey, the route runs 166.80 miles (268.44 km) from the Cape May–Lewes Ferry terminal in North Cape May, Cape May County, where the ferry carries US 9 across the Delaware Bay to Lewes, Delaware, north to the George Washington Bridge in Fort Lee, Bergen County, where the route along with Interstate 95 (I-95) and US 1 continue into New York City. US 9 is the longest U.S. Highway in the state.

From North Cape May north to Toms River in Ocean County, US 9 is mostly a two-lane undivided road that closely parallels the Garden State Parkway (GSP) and runs near the Jersey Shore. Along this stretch, it passes through the communities of Rio Grande, Cape May Court House, Somers Point, Pleasantville, Absecon, Tuckerton, Manahawkin, Beachwood, and Berkeley Township. In Toms River, US 9 runs along the GSP for a short distance before heading northwest away from it and the Jersey Shore into Lakewood Township.

Upon entering Monmouth County, the route grows to a multilane suburban divided highway, as it continues through Howell Township, Freehold Township, Manalapan Township, Marlboro Township, Old Bridge Township, Sayreville, and South Amboy. This section of the route is an important commuter artery from these bedroom communities into North Jersey and New York City, and helps New York and North Jersey residents reach popular destinations such as the Freehold Raceway, Freehold Raceway Mall, and the Jersey Shore. In Woodbridge Township, US 9 merges with US 1 and the two routes run concurrently through northern New Jersey as US 1/9 to the George Washington Bridge, where they continue into New York.

Before 1927, the current alignment of US 9 had been legislated as parts of several New Jersey state highways, including the original Route 14 from Cape May to Seaville, Route 19 between Seaville and Absecon, the original Route 4 between Absecon and Lakewood and South Amboy and Rahway, Route 7 Spur between Lakewood and Freehold, and the original Route 1 between Rahway and Jersey City. US 9 was initially only signed through New Jersey in 1926 to run from US 30 in Absecon north to the New York border in Alpine, where it became US 9W; it ran more to the east of its current alignment between Lakewood and South Amboy. In 1927, US 9 became Route 4 between Absecon and Lakewood and South Amboy and Rahway, Route 35 between Lakewood and Belmar and Eatontown and South Amboy (now Route 88 south of Point Pleasant), Route 4N (now Route 71) between Belmar and Eatontown, Route 27 between Rahway and Newark, Route 25 between Newark and Jersey City, and Route 1 north of Jersey City.

By the 1940s, US 9 had been extended south on Route 4 to Cape May and rerouted to current Route 4 between Lakewood and South Amboy. In addition, the route was moved to its current alignment between South Amboy and Jersey City, following Route 35 and Route 25, and routed to cross the Hudson River on the George Washington Bridge, using a part of Route 6. The state highway concurrencies were removed in 1953, and two realignments occurred to the route as a result of the construction of the GSP in the 1950s. Once the GSP was opened in 1954, its traffic temporarily concurred to the Beasley's Point bridge. This concurrency would be removed in 1955, with the completion of the Little Egg Harbor Bridge. In the 1970s, US 9 was extended across the Cape May–Lewes Ferry to continue into Delaware with the former route into Cape May becoming Route 109. Also around this time, two freeways were proposed for US 9 in Atlantic and Monmouth counties but never built. The Beesley's Point Bridge over Great Egg Harbor Bay was closed in 2004, with US 9 rerouted to use the Great Egg Harbor Bridge along the GSP in 2013.

== Route description ==
=== Cape May County ===
From the Cape May Terminal off of the Cape May–Lewes Ferry toll plaza, which carries US 9 across the Delaware Bay to Lewes, Delaware, US 9 continues north on Ferry Road, a divided highway with one northbound lane and three southbound lanes which is under the maintenance of the Delaware River and Bay Authority. The road soon turns east and becomes four-lane divided Lincoln Boulevard. It runs between the residential community of North Cape May to the north and wetlands to the south within Lower Township, Cape May County. The road becomes Sandman Boulevard at the intersection with County Route 603 (CR 603), where it enters woodland and narrows into a two-lane undivided road. After a turn southeast, US 9 comes to a crossroads with CR 626, which heads south to cross the Cape May Canal as Route 162. After crossing the Cape May Seashore Lines railroad tracks, US 9 turns north onto Shore Road, while Route 109 continues straight to head south into Cape May. Shore Road, which is maintained by the New Jersey Department of Transportation (NJDOT), carries the route northward through a mix of woods and marshland containing some development, with the Cape May Seashore Lines tracks running immediately to the west and the GSP a short distance to the east. The road passes near Historic Cold Spring Village prior to a brief bend farther to the east of the railroad tracks as the route continues west of the Cape May National Golf Club and through Erma.

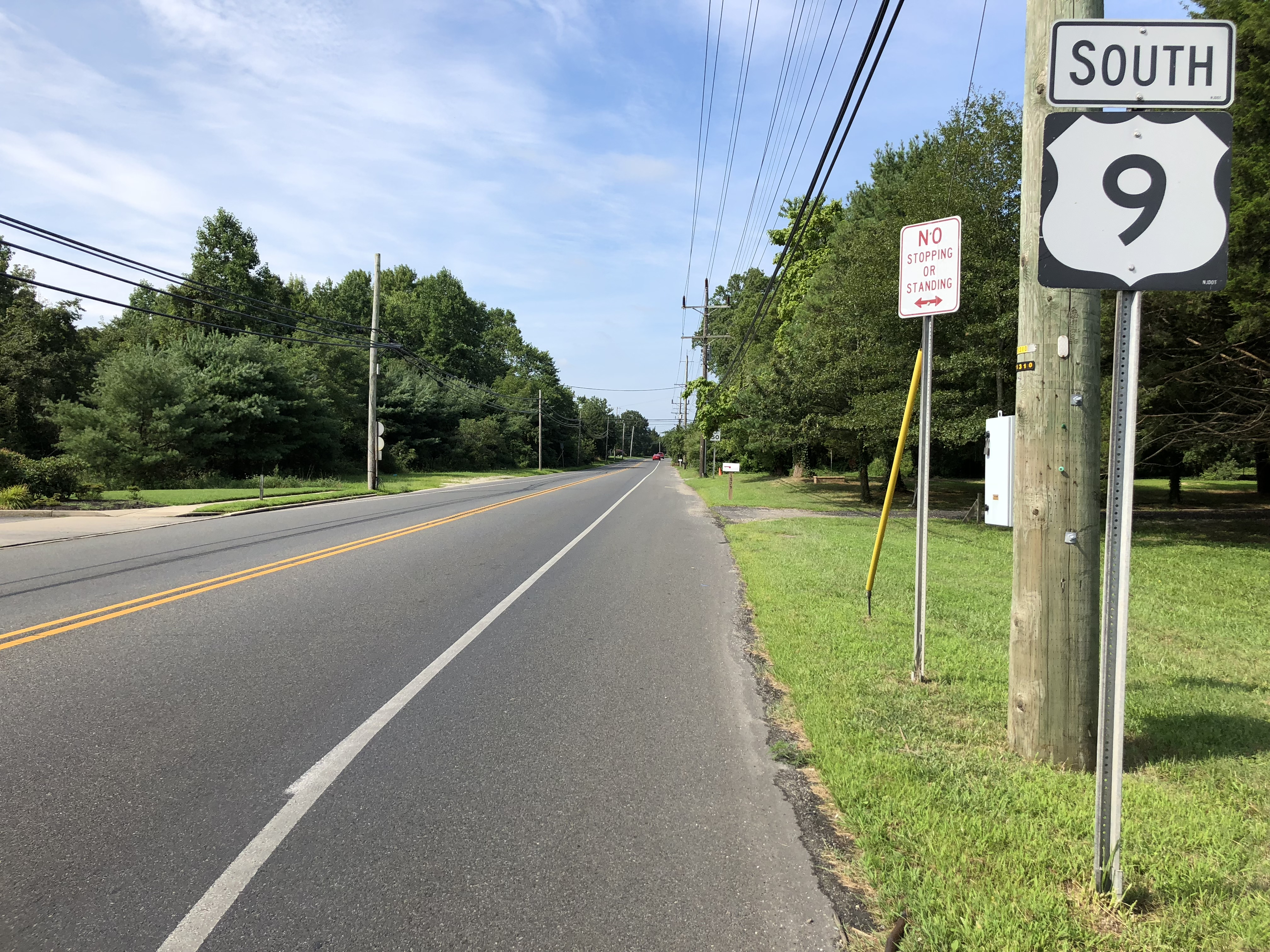
US 9 southbound past its intersection with CR 601 in Middle Township

US 9 crosses into Middle Township, where it continues northeast into the commercial community of Rio Grande. Here, the road briefly widens to four lanes as it has an intersection with Route 47, which runs up the west bank of the cape. From this point, the two-lane route continues into a mix of woods and development. Heading into Burleigh, US 9 intersects Route 147 and CR 618. Route 147/CR 618, as well as Route 47, provide access to the Wildwoods resort area on the Jersey Shore. North of the Route 147 intersection, US 9 draws alongside the GSP as it passes near The Shore Club golf course. Shortly after pulling away from the GSP once again, the highway continues into Cape May Court House, the county seat of Cape May County.

In this community, US 9 runs past a mix of homes and businesses, intersecting CR 674 and CR 657, both of which provide access to the GSP at their respective interchanges. At the CR 657 intersection, US 9 briefly gains a center left-turn lane and passes west of Cape Regional Medical Center. Upon leaving Cape May Court House, the route runs into more rural surroundings and comes to an intersection with CR 609, which heads east to an interchange with the GSP, and Zoo Road, which heads west to the Cape May County Park & Zoo. Past here, the road again draws closer to the parkway and comes to a ramp that provides access to the southbound direction of the parkway. Continuing northeast through more wooded development, US 9 intersects CR 601 before entering Dennis Township.

A short distance later, in the community of Clermont, Route 83 splits off to the northwest. Past this intersection, US 9 continues northeast through more rural areas, reaching an intersection with CR 625 after passing by Magnolia Lake. Following the CR 625 intersection, the road comes to CR 550, which heads to the west. Not long after the CR 550 intersection, US 9 continues into Upper Township, where it passes rural development before reaching Seaville. Here, there is an intersection with the southern terminus of Route 50 and a ramp providing access to the southbound direction of the GSP and from the northbound direction of the GSP. At this intersection, the route is briefly a divided highway. Past this junction, the road continues northeast, where residential development becomes more constant alongside the road as it passes through Palermo.

US 9 reaches the community of Marmora, where it heads into commercial areas and briefly becomes a divided highway as it intersects CR 623. At this intersection, US 9 turns southeast to run concurrent with CR 623 on Roosevelt Boulevard, while Shore Road continues north into Beesley's Point to a dead end at the site of the former Beesley's Point Bridge; this section of Shore Road is still inventoried as part of US 9 by NJDOT even though it no longer carries through traffic along US 9 since the bridge was closed and demolished. US 9/CR 623 then runs southeast as five-lane road with a center left-turn lane that passes businesses. The road comes to an interchange with the GSP, with a park-and-ride lot located within the northwest quadrant of the interchange. At this interchange, US 9 heads northeast on the four-lane limited-access tolled parkway while CR 623 continues to Ocean City. The parkway, which has a wide median, carries the route through wooded areas between Beesley's Point to the west and marshland to the east. The median narrows as the highway comes to the Great Egg Harbor Bridge over the Great Egg Harbor Bay.

=== Atlantic County ===
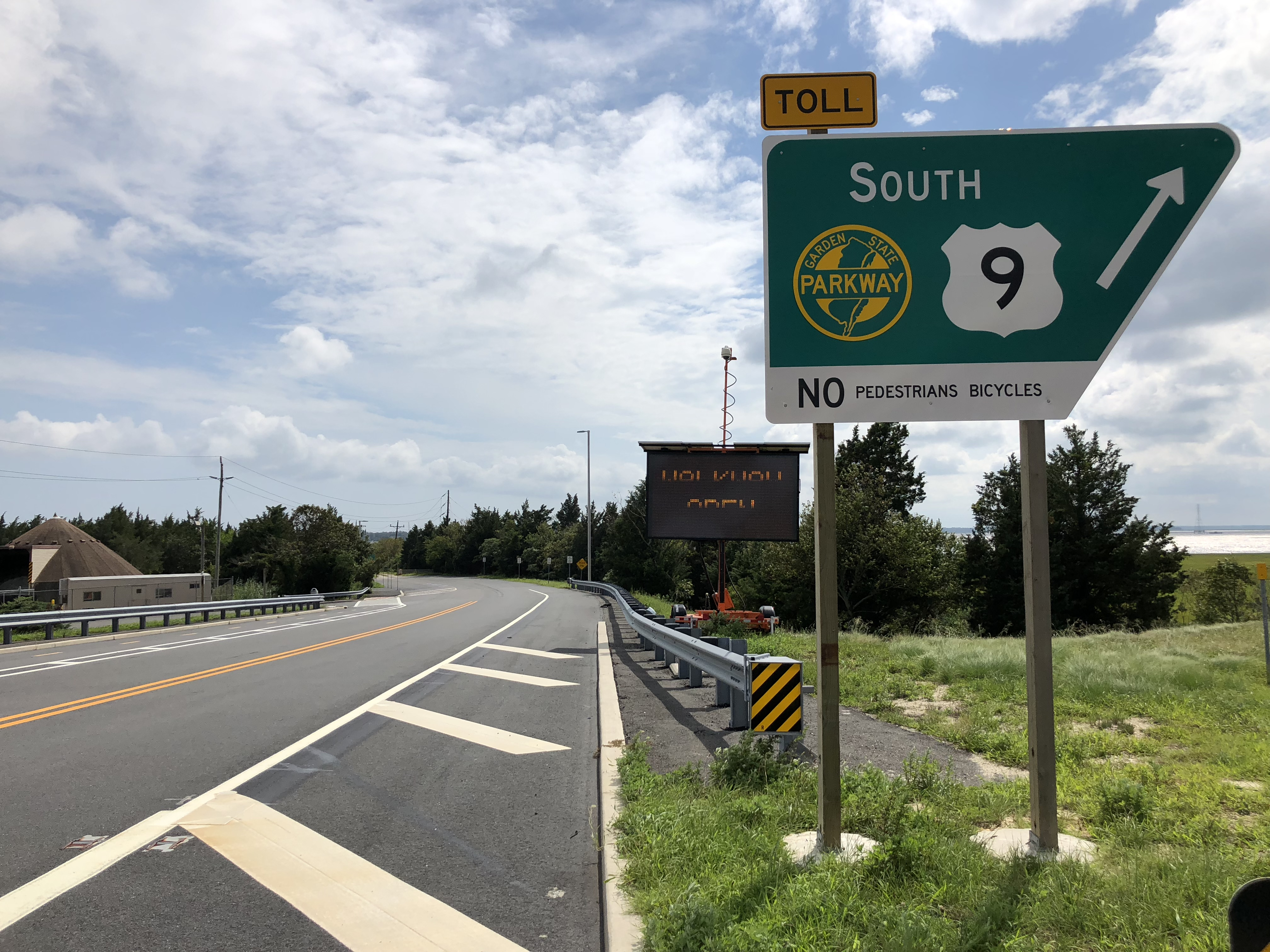
US 9 southbound at the northern end of its concurrency with the GSP in Somers Point

The highway then crosses the Great Egg Harbor Bay into Egg Harbor Township, Atlantic County, where it runs across marshy Drag Island into Somers Point before passing over the Drag Channel. Southbound drivers of both US 9 and the GSP are then required to pay a toll at the Little Egg toll plaza before US 9 leaves the roadway at a partial interchange. Now called New Road, the route runs through developed areas prior to crossing CR 559. The road winds east through the Greate Bay Golf Club, before turning north and intersecting the northern terminus of Route 52, a route leading to Ocean City, and West Laurel Drive, which provides access to the northbound GSP and from the southbound GSP. At this intersection, the road contains a median. From this point, the two-lane undivided US 9 is lined with businesses and continues northeast, gaining a center left-turn lane prior to the CR 559 Alternate (CR 559 Alt.) intersection. Here, the route enters Linwood and the turn lane ends as it heads through suburban areas. The road continues into Northfield, where it comes to CR 563. US 9 enters Pleasantville, intersecting US 40/US 322 (Black Horse Pike), a surface route to nearby Atlantic City to the east. The road turns more north-northeast past this intersection, crossing a trail and the Southern Railroad of New Jersey's Pleasantville Industrial Track line. The route reaches an interchange with the Atlantic City Expressway, the toll road leading into Atlantic City.

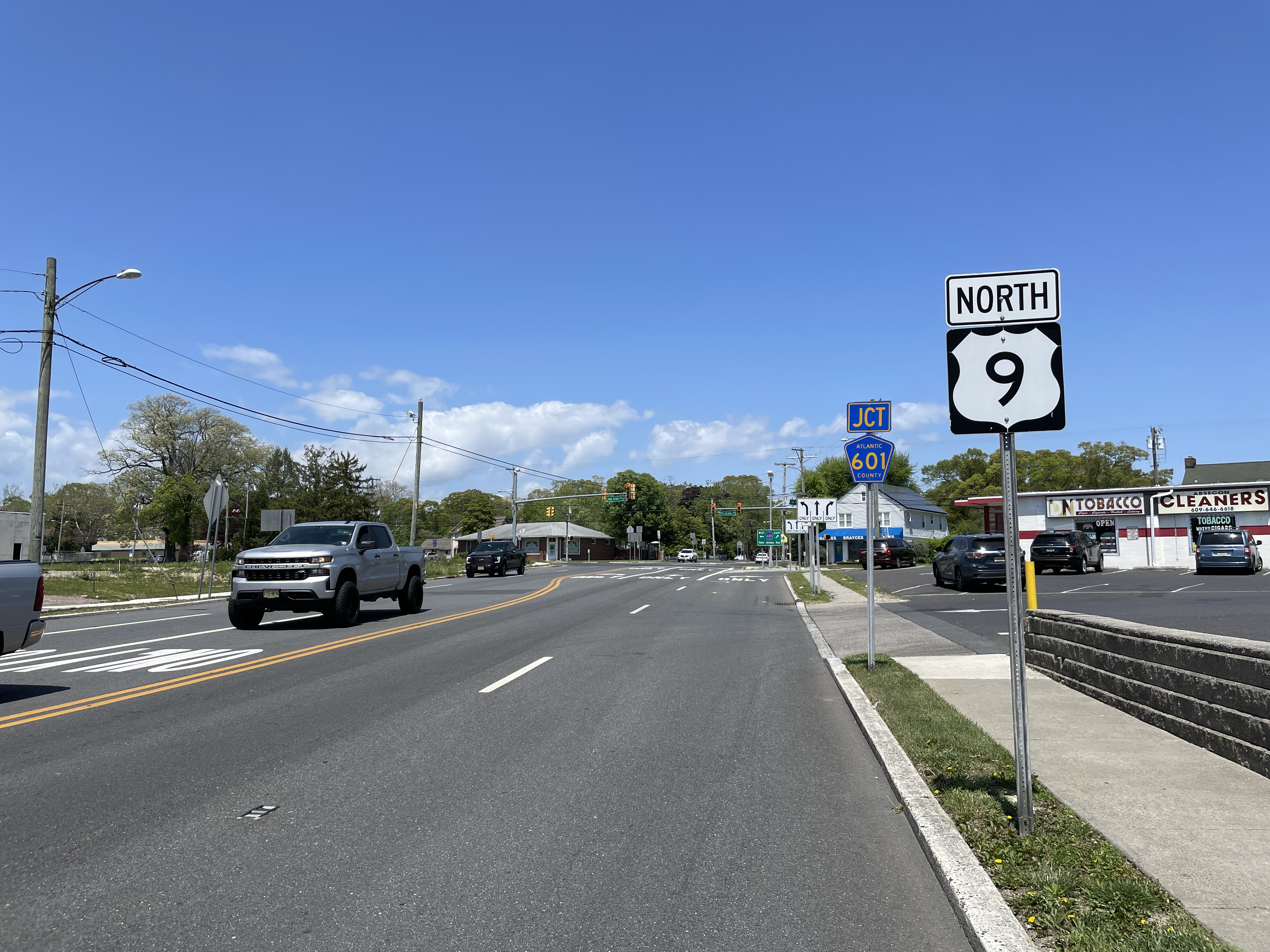
US 9 northbound past US 30 in Absecon

After this interchange, US 9 crosses CR 646 and enters Absecon. The route crosses the marshy Absecon Creek prior to passing businesses. After crossing under NJ Transit's Atlantic City Line, another route into Atlantic City, US 30 (White Horse Pike), intersects with US 9. After US 30, the route turns east into wooded neighborhoods, becoming Wyoming Avenue. Route 157 then intersects US 9 from the south, with US 9 making a left turn to head northeast onto Shore Road. The road continues into Galloway Township, with residential development becoming less dense as it runs a short distance to the west of inland bays, intersecting with the southern terminus of CR 561.

Past this intersection, US 9 draws farther from the inland bays and becomes New York Road. The road continues through dense woodland with some housing where it then reaches Smithville. Here, it intersects with the southern terminus of CR 561 Bypass before it crosses CR 561 Alt. Upon leaving Smithville, the land it crosses gets much more dense with trees. The road turns slightly north-northwest as it crosses the marshy Nacote Creek, entering Port Republic and continuing north. After intersecting with CR 575, the road passes a dedicated monument for the Battle of Chestnut Neck as it intersects the southern terminus of the southern segment of Route 167. Following this intersection, US 9 turns west and merges onto the GSP at an interchange. The limited-access parkway, which is six lanes wide, carries US 9 north through marshland to a crossing of the Mullica River. Despite the GSP being a toll road, there are no tolls to pay through this segment.

=== Pine Barrens ===
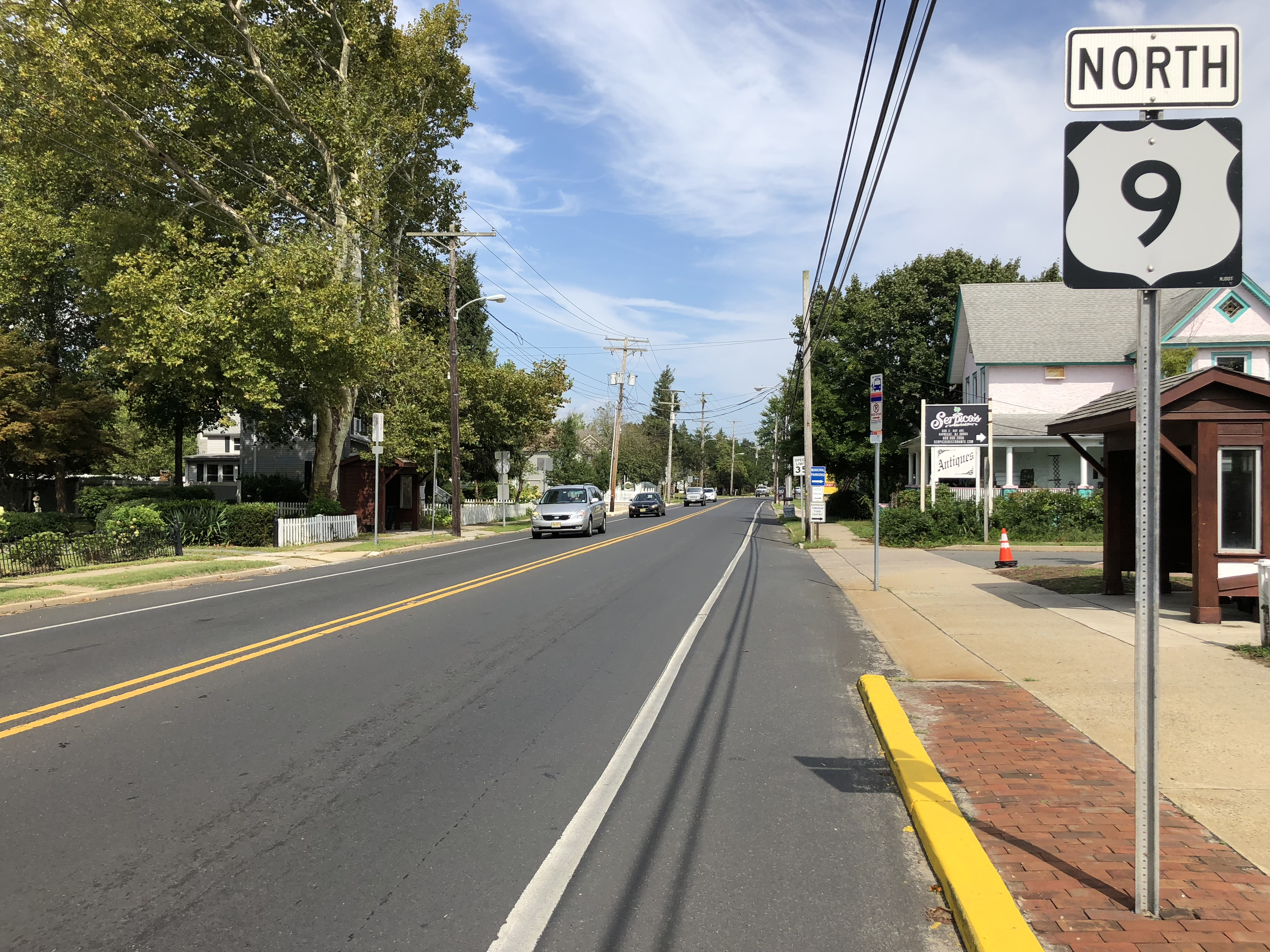
US 9 northbound past its intersection with CR 554 in Barnegat Township

This river crossing takes the two routes into Bass River Township and Burlington County, where US 9 merges off the GSP. The route heads northwest and returns onto New York Road through woodland, intersecting with the northern terminus of the northern segment of Route 167. At this point, the route turns north and comes to a junction with CR 542. US 9 then turns east into the residential New Gretna before crossing under the nearby GSP without an interchange and passing over the marshy Bass River on a two-lane bridge that runs under the GSP and the Bass River bridge. This section runs along the eastern edge of the Pine Barrens, with occasional areas of developed land.

The road then crosses the Balanger Creek where it travels into Little Egg Harbor Township in Ocean County, where US 9's street becomes unnamed. Continuing east, the roadway enters Tuckerton and passes more densely packed development and the Tuckerton Seaport as Main Street. US 9 then crosses the Tuckerton Creek near Pohatcong Lake prior to intersecting with the southern terminus of CR 539. From this point, the road resumes a north-northeast bearing, passing more of the Pine Barrens as it continues back into Little Egg Harbor Township and runs through Parkertown. Upon entering Eagleswood Township, US 9 passes through the residential community of West Creek. Continuing into Stafford Township, the route reaches Manahawkin, where developmed land increases. In Manahawkin, Route 72, the main route to Long Beach Island, meets US 9 at a cloverleaf interchange. In the vicinity of the interchange, the road is a four-lane divided highway.

After this interchange, the two-lane road passes more development before becoming more wooded. US 9 enters Barnegat Township, where it reaches the community of Barnegat, located a short distance to the west of the Barnegat Bay. In this community, there is an intersection with the eastern terminus of CR 554. Past this intersection, the route enters Ocean Township. In this area, US 9 comes to Waretown, where it becomes unnamed and intersects with CR 532 into a commercial area. Leaving Waretown, the road heads north through areas of woodland and businesses before crossing Oyster Creek into Lacey Township. Here, the road passes to the east of former Oyster Creek Nuclear Generating Station before crossing over a branch of the Forked River. At this point, US 9 runs past businesses in the community of Forked River, turning back to the north-northeast.

The land gets more built up as the road enters Lanoka Harbor. A crossing of the Cedar Creek takes the route into Berkeley Township and US 9 continues north as Atlantic City Boulevard. At Bayville, the route is lined with businesses and makes a turn to the northwest. The road briefly forms the border between Berkeley Township to the southwest and Pine Beach to the northeast prior to crossing into Beachwood. In Beachwood, Route 166 heads north as the route widens into a four-lane divided highway. Past Route 166, US 9 turns more to the west past residential neighborhoods as a four-lane undivided road, entering South Toms River, where it widens into a divided highway. US 9 crosses with CR 530 prior to merging onto the GSP again at another interchange. At this interchange, the southbound direction of US 9 briefly runs concurrent with eastbound CR 530.

=== Toms River to Freehold ===
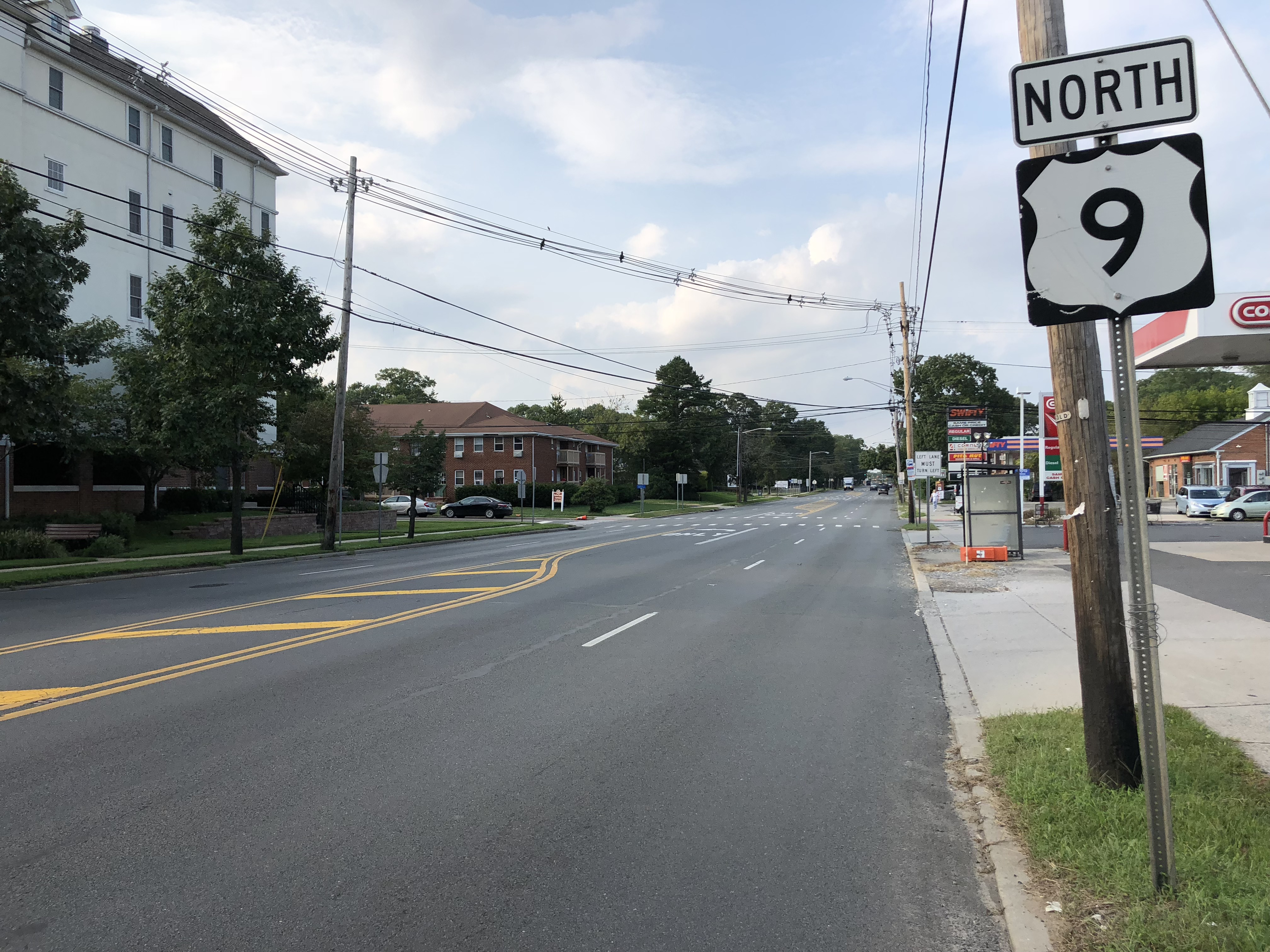
US 9 northbound past CR 547 in Lakewood Township

Joined with the eight-lane GSP, US 9 briefly passes through Berkeley Township again before crossing the Toms River and entering the township of Toms River. Here, the road reaches the exit for CR 527. Past CR 527, the road comes to a cloverleaf interchange with Route 37 at exit 82. US 9 leaves the GSP again at the next exit, just before the Toms River Toll Plaza. At this point, the route intersects the northern terminus of Route 166 and an exit for southbound Route 166, which it takes via GSP exit 83. At this point, it heads north along Lakewood Road, a four-lane divided road that comes to an intersection with CR 571. Following this intersection, the road passes wooded suburban areas, turning more to the north-northwest. After a turn to the north, US 9 reaches an interchange with Route 70, a route connecting the northern part of the Jersey Shore to the Delaware Valley.

After this junction, the road takes the name River Avenue as it comes into Lakewood Township. Upon entering Lakewood Township, the road then passes commercial establishments containing Monmouth Medical Center Southern Campus and running through the tree-covered residential neighborhoods. After crossing the Southern Secondary railroad line operated by the Delaware and Raritan River Railroad, the road passes to the east of Lake Carasaljo as it intersects with CR 528 and CR 547. At this intersection, CR 547 forms a concurrency with US 9 and the two routes continue north on Madison Avenue, crossing the Metedeconk River, which Lake Carasaljo is formed from. After intersecting the western terminus of Route 88, Madison Avenue continues north through the commercial and residential center of Lakewood as a four-lane undivided road, with CR 547 splitting from US 9 by turning east. Entering a business area, the route crosses paths with CR 526.

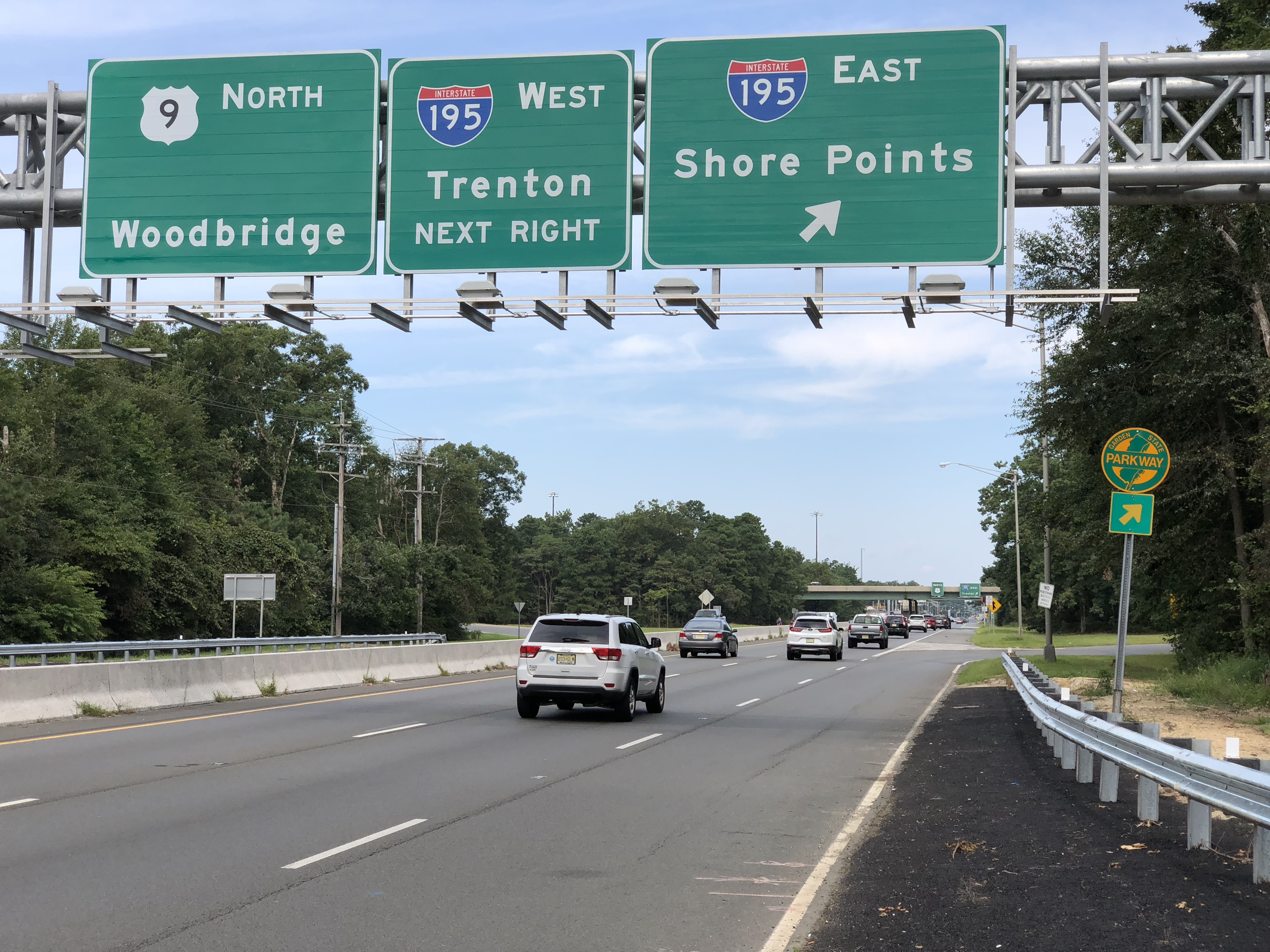
US 9 northbound at the I-195 interchange in Howell Township

US 9 enters Howell Township, Monmouth County, where it becomes the Lila W. Thompson Memorial Highway and at the point where it crosses over the North Branch Metedeconk River. The road runs north, lined with businesses and shopping centers as it has several intersections with jughandles. In this area, the route reaches an interchange with I-195, where US 9 begins a northwestward slant. After this interchange, the highway continues north and passes west of the Howell Park & Ride, with a bus stop next to the northbound lanes serving NJ Transit busses. Past here, the highway enters Freehold Township, where it crosses CR 524.

=== Freehold to US 1 ===
After entering into Freehold Township, the route turns north and has an intersection with Route 79 before the interchange with the freeway segment of Route 33 . Following Route 33, the highway continues northwest and passes southwest of the Freehold Mall, where a park-and-ride lot is located. Then, the route enters the Freehold Borough, the county seat of Monmouth County, and it has an interchange with CR 537. US 9 then enters Freehold Township again as it passes between the Freehold Raceway Mall to the west and the Freehold Raceway to the east. The route turns north, widens to eight lanes, and intersects with Route 33 Business (Route 33 Bus.) at the location of the former Freehold Circle. From this point, US 9 runs west of Freehold Borough and east of Monmouth Battlefield State Park, as a six-lane highway before crossing over the Freehold Secondary railroad line operated by the Delaware and Raritan River Railroad and CR 522, with ramps providing access to the latter.

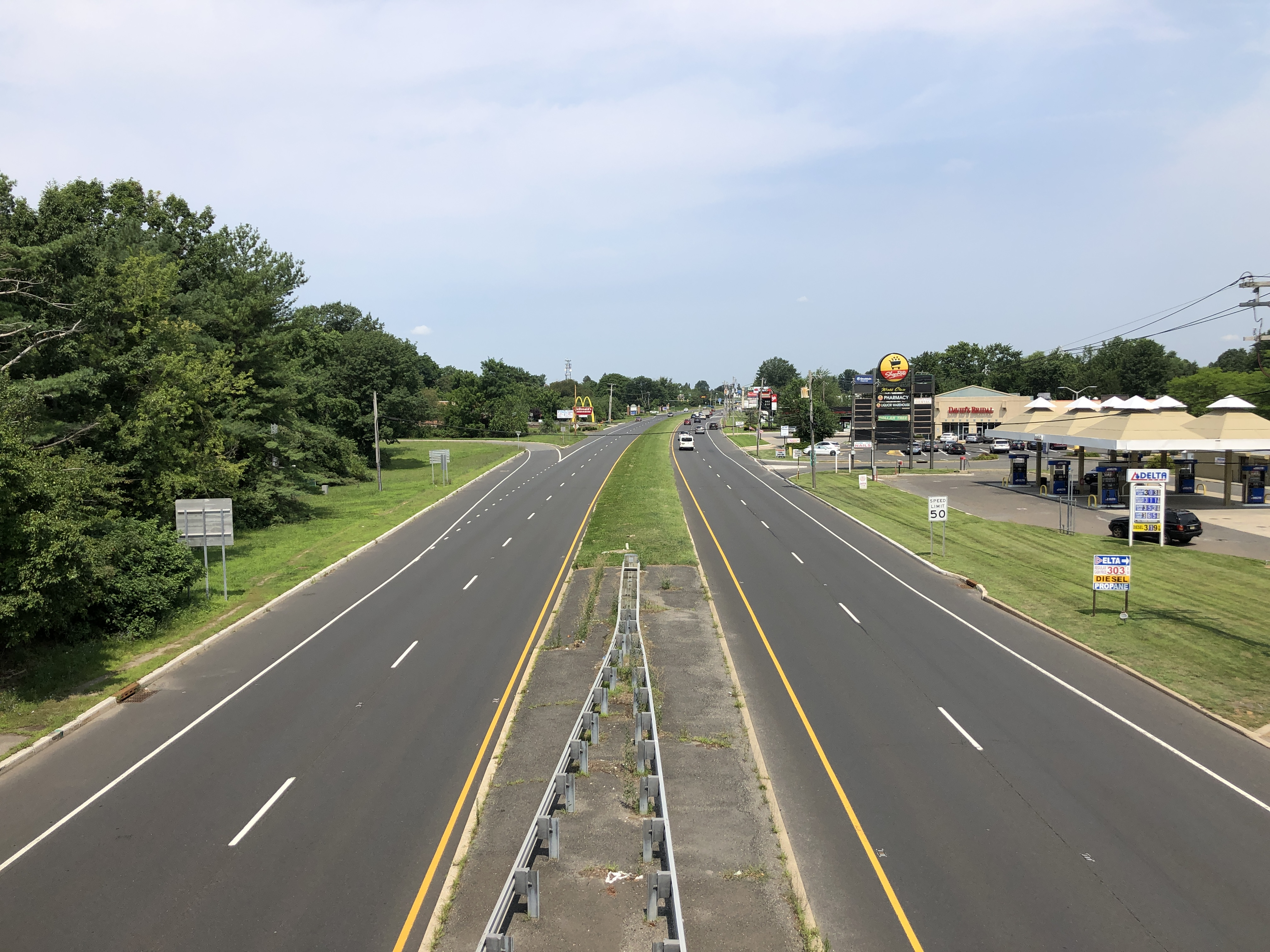
US 9 northbound at the Route 33 interchange in Freehold Township

After this interchange, the highway returns to four lanes and intersects with Schibanoff Lane, which leads west to the Freehold Township Commuter Lot. The route then enters Manalapan Township immediately after its intersection with Craig Road and East Freehold Road, with a park-and-ride lot situated northwest of the intersection in a shopping center. US 9 then runs through more suburban areas and passes to the east of the Manalapan EpiCentre big-box complex. The road then crosses Symmes Drive and Ryan Road, where a park-and-ride lot is located on the northwest corner. US 9 reaches an interchange with CR 3 before passing a mix of farmland and development as it crosses into Marlboro Township. In Marlboro Township, businesses predominate the road as it reaches an interchange with Union Hill Road. Following this, US 9 continues north and crosses with CR 520.

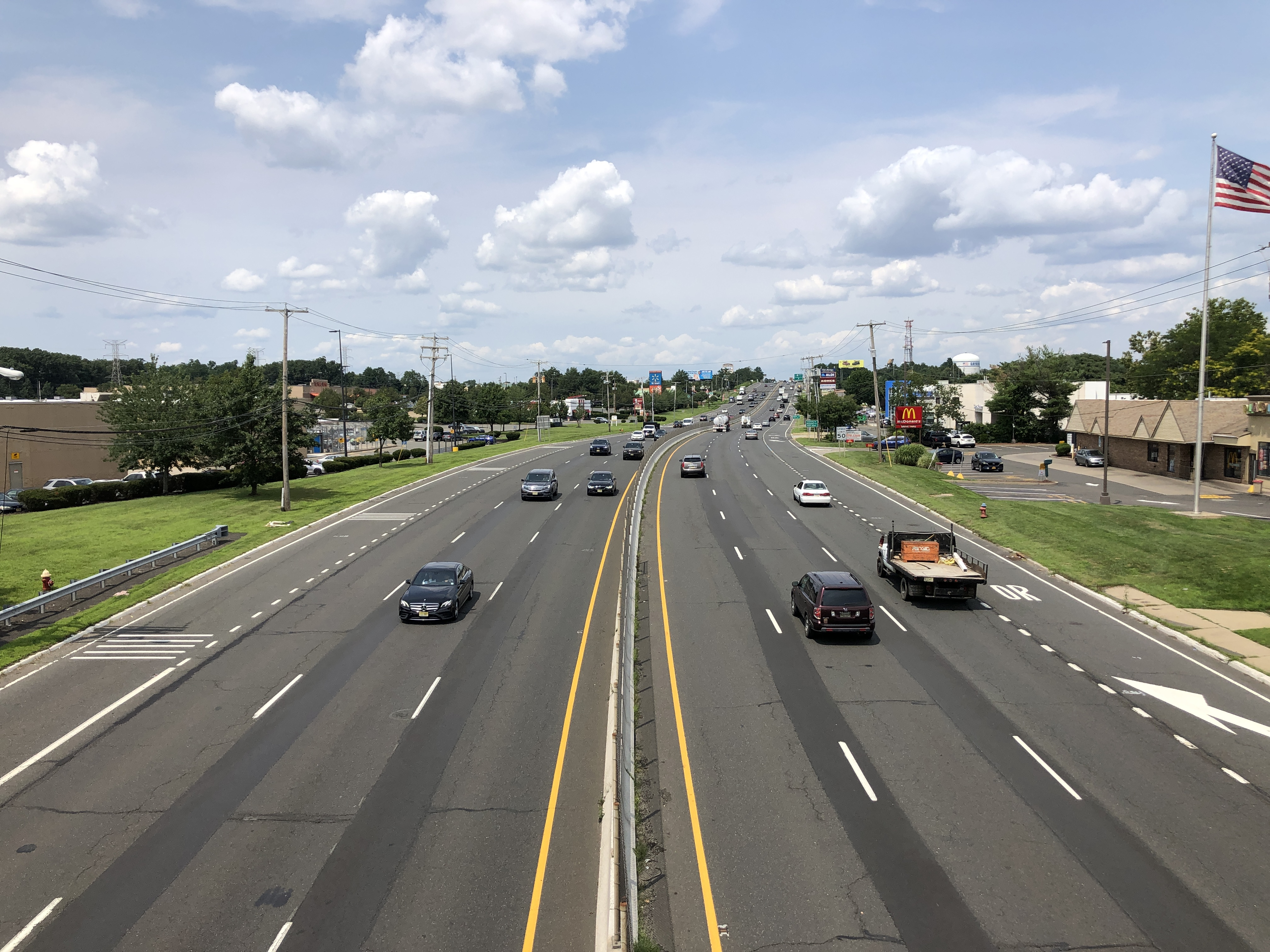
US 9 northbound in Old Bridge Township

The road then enters Old Bridge Township and Middlesex County, where it becomes the Joann H. Smith Memorial Highway and interchanges with the Route 18 freeway. Within this interchange, the travel lanes of US 9 split. From Route 18, the route widens to six lanes as it eventually comes to interchanges with Throckmorton Lane, Ticetown Road, and CR 516. Past CR 516, the highway passes a mix of woodland and farmfields and then crosses Jake Brown Road, where a park-and-ride lot is located on the northeast corner. Route 34 then intersects US 9 at a directional interchange, with access from southbound US 9 to southbound Route 34 and from northbound Route 34 to northbound US 9. Missing movements between northbound Route 34 and southbound US 9 and northbound US 9 and southbound Route 34 are provided by Perrine Road to the south. From Route 34 through to the US 1/9 concurrency in Avenel, there are no jughandles or other intersections, just right-in/right-out access and interchanges. Past Route 34, the highway continues past the Old Bridge Park & Ride, with a bus terminal next to the northbound lanes serving NJ Transit buses, and several shopping centers, with a southbound exit and entrance serving the park-and-ride and one of the shopping centers. US 9 enters Sayreville, where it passes more suburban areas, interchanging with CR 673 and CR 615. A short distance after the latter, the road comes to a partial interchange with the GSP at exit 123; this interchange only has access from the parkway southbound to US 9 south and from US 9 north to the northbound parkway. US 9 narrows to four lanes past this interchange and runs northeast as it enters South Amboy. The route comes to an interchange with Route 35, merging onto that route for a concurrency while Main Street (CR 684) continues north past the concurrency with Route 35.

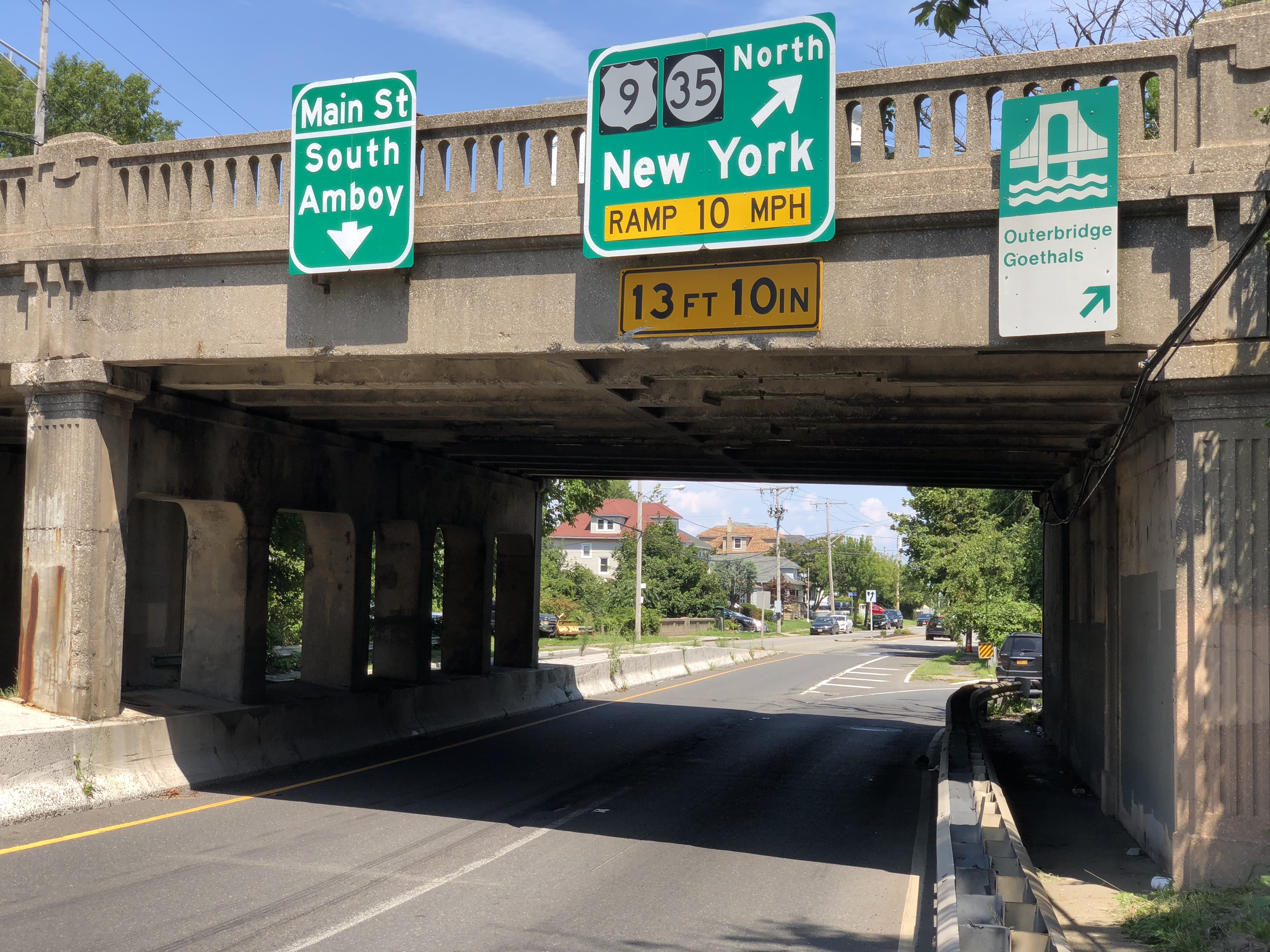
A single-lane, 10 mph (16 km/h) ramp connects US 9 northbound to Route 35 northbound in South Amboy

The concurrent US 9 and Route 35 head northwest as a four-lane divided highway through commercial areas and woodland, crossing over Conrail Shared Assets Operations (CSAO)'s Amboy Secondary before turning north and interchanging with CR 535 (Raritan Street) and Kearney Road, crossing back into Sayreville at the interchange with the former. At this point, the road widens to six lanes. The two routes split at an interchange (the former Victory Circle) that has access to the southbound GSP and from the northbound GSP by way of Chevalier Avenue and the Main Street Extension. From here, US 9 closely parallels the east side of the GSP as it crosses the Raritan River on the Edison Bridge, with the parkway crossing the river on the Driscoll Bridge. Upon crossing the Raritan River, US 9 enters Woodbridge Township, where it reaches a complex interchange with the Garden State Parkway, the Route 440 freeway, and CR 656. Within this interchange, the GSP's travel lanes run in between the travel lanes of US 9, with this configuration continuing past the interchange for a short distance. Along this stretch, the road passes under CSAO's Perth Amboy Running Track line and there are ramps to and from CR 616 and to the parkway and the New Jersey Turnpike (I-95).

After US 9 heads east away from the parkway, it reaches a cloverleaf interchange with Route 184 and CR 501, where it continues into a business district. A short distance later, the highway crosses over the access road between the GSP and the New Jersey Turnpike just east of the toll plaza and then the New Jersey Turnpike itself. From this point, the highway passes several office parks, reaching an interchange with CR 514. After CR 514, the route passes some residential neighborhoods before passing to the east of the Woodbridge Center shopping mall. After passing under CSAO's Port Reading Secondary line, US 9 then junctions with CR 604 prior to merging with US 1 at a southbound exit and northbound entrance, becoming US 1/9.

=== US 1/9 concurrency ===
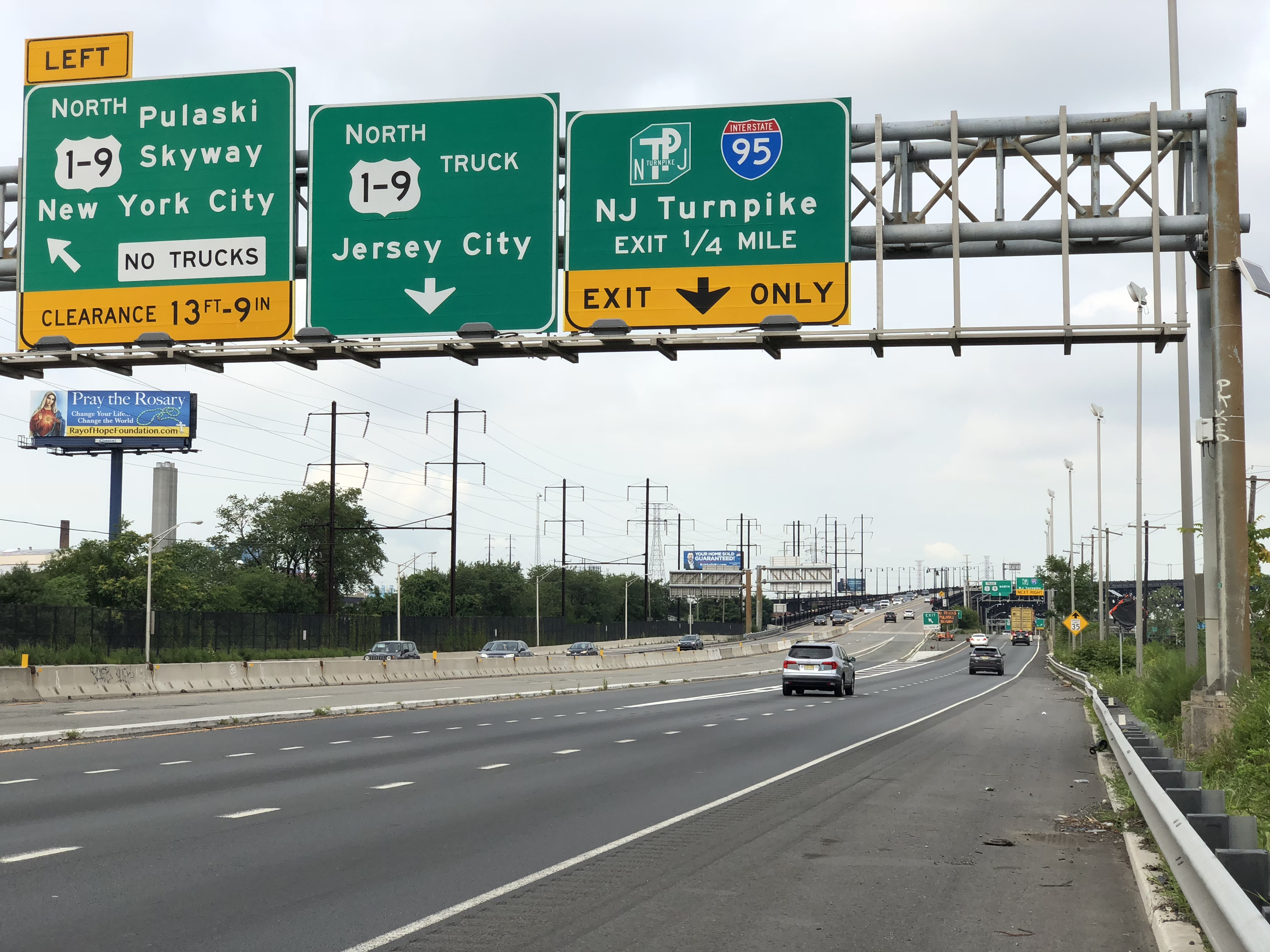
US 1/9 northbound at the beginning of US 1/9 Truck in Newark

US 1 and US 9 become concurrent upon merging in Woodbridge Township and continue through heavily developed areas, interchanging with Route 35 for a second time. Soon after this interchange, jughandles and other traffic light-controlled intersections resume. Upon entering Union County, US 1/9 pass through Rahway and Linden, interchanging with I-278's eastern terminus in Linden. The road continues into urban Elizabeth, crossing Route 439 before turning into a freeway before meeting Route 81 near the Newark Liberty International Airport. US 1/9 both continue along the west end of the airport into Newark and Essex County, reaching the Newark Airport Interchange with I-78, US 22, and Route 21. From this interchange, the road continues northeast through industrial areas to an interchange with US 1/9 Truck that provides access to the New Jersey Turnpike (I-95).

US 1/9 continue onto the Pulaski Skyway, which carries the route over the Passaic River into Hudson County, crossing over Kearny and the Hackensack River before coming into Jersey City. Trucks are banned from the Pulaski Skyway and must use US 1/9 Truck to bypass it.

The Pulaski Skyway ends at the Tonnele Circle with US 1/9 Truck and Route 139, and US 1/9 continue north along at-grade Tonnelle Avenue toward North Bergen, where the road intersects Route 3 and Route 495. Crossing into Bergen County, Broad Avenue carries US 1/9 through Fairview and Ridgefield before heading into Palisades Park. Here, the two routes join US 46, and the combined road heads north into Fort Lee. US 1/9/US 46 come to an interchange with I-95, US 9W, and Route 4, where it joins I-95 and the Iv95 extension to head east towards the George Washington Bridge over the Hudson River. At this point, US 46 ends and I-95 and US 1/9 continue into Manhattan as the Trans-Manhattan Expressway.

== Route 9 BBS ==
The Route 9 BBS, or bus bypass shoulder, are a part of the express bus system in Monmouth and Middlesex counties. The road is used by NJ Transit's routes 63, 64, and 67 to Hudson County; the 130, 132, 136, and 139 to the Port Authority Bus Terminal; and Academy Bus Lines to Lower Manhattan. The bus lanes run for about three miles (4.8 km) in Old Bridge Township and are the first component of a planned 20-mile (32 km) BBS corridor into Monmouth and northern Ocean counties. In 2010, Stantec issued recommendations for design, construction, and implementation of the BBS extension. The second phase of the project would start at the project's southern end near Lakewood Terminal near Route 88. The third phase and final phase would connect the northern and southern segments passing through Freehold Township and proximate towns, where work would include some widening and deepening of the roadbed to handle bus traffic.

== History ==
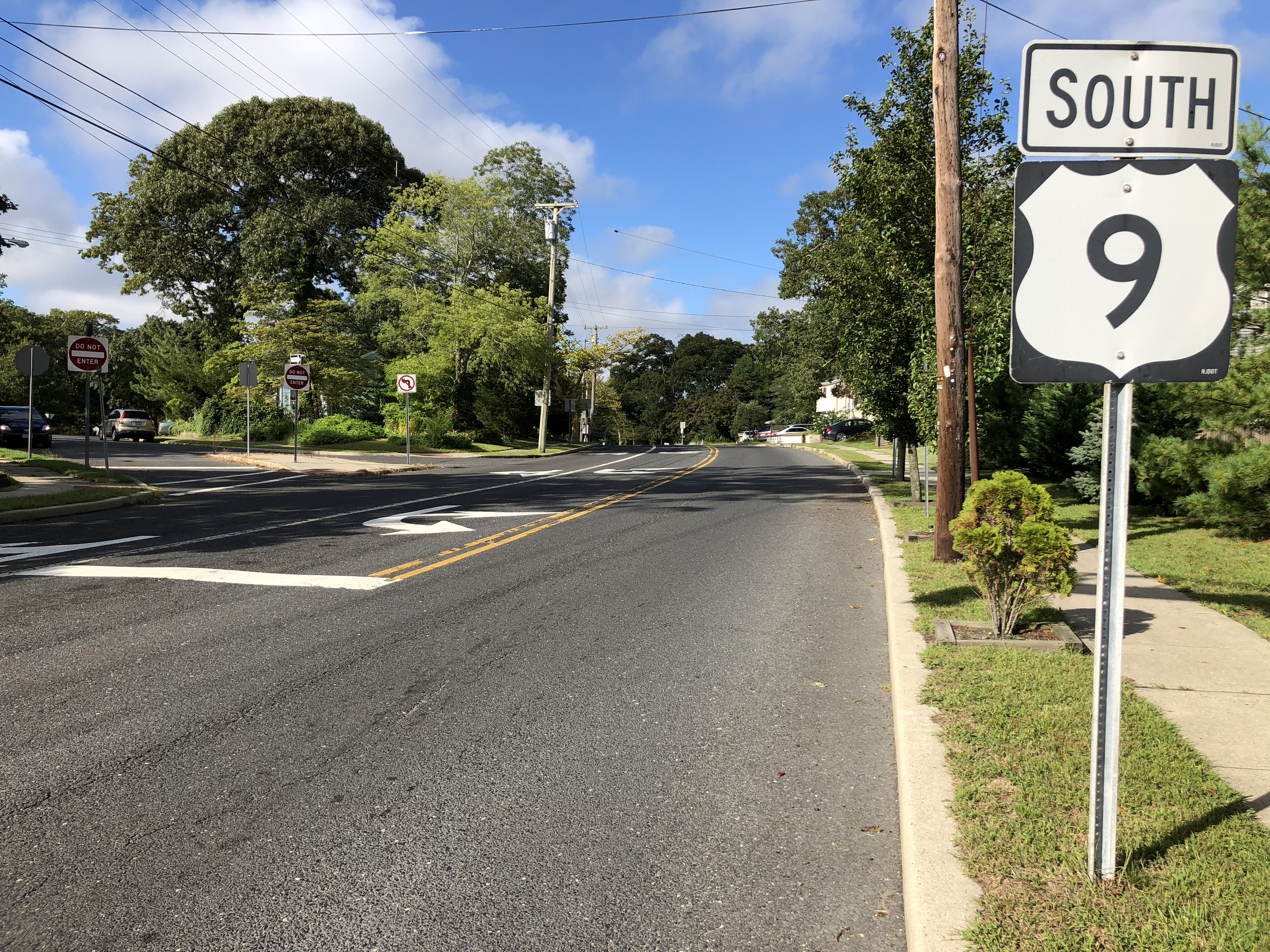
US 9 southbound past CR 634 and CR 651 in Absecon

What would later become US 9 was originally part of a Lenape trail running from the Great Navesink Trail down to what is now Cape May. The section of the road between Nacote Creek in Port Republic and Somers Point, called Shore Road, was first laid out in 1731 to replace an earlier road along the coast of that area. South of Cape May Courthouse, the road was part of the Cape May Turnpike, which also included parts of Seashore Drive and Route 109. Later, the road from Cape May to Toms River would become part of the Jersey Coast Way, stretching from Cape May to the Staten Island Ferry. The road was legislated as part of several state routes in the 1910s and 1920s. Between Cape May and Seaville, the road was legislated as part of Route 14 in 1917. Route 19 was designated to run along the current route between Seaville and Absecon but was never built. From Absecon north to Lakewood, and from South Amboy to Rahway, Route 4 was designated in 1916 along the current route. Between Lakewood and Freehold, Route 7 Spur, created in 1925, was to run on the present US 9 alignment. Between Rahway and Elizabeth, Route 1 was created in 1916; an extension north to the Holland Tunnel was planned in 1922.

When the U.S. Numbered Highway System was established in 1926, US 9 was designated in New Jersey to run from US 30 in Absecon north to the New York border in Alpine, where it continued into New York as US 9W. In New Jersey, the route followed the entirety of Route 4 between Absecon and Rahway, bending farther to the east of its current alignment between Lakewood and South Amboy by running closer to the Atlantic Ocean. In Rahway, US 9 joined US 1 and Route 1 for a concurrency north toward Newark. Past Newark, the road followed current US 1/9 Truck toward Jersey City, where US 1 and US 9 split. At this point, US 9 continued north on its current alignment in Fort Lee, where it then ran north on present-day CR 501 toward the New York border. US 9 was designated along this alignment to the New York border as the original numbering plans called for it to continue up the west bank of the Hudson River to Albany, New York, with US 109 running along the east bank of the river. It, however, was instead split into two suffixed routes in New York, with US 9W running along the west bank and US 9E running along the east bank, New Jersey had kept its alignment of US 9 to US 9W at the border in Alpine.

In the 1927 New Jersey state highway renumbering, the present-day routing of US 9 between Cape May and Woodbridge became part of Route 4, while the portion along the US 1/9 concurrency south of the Tonnele Circle became part of Route 25 and north of there to the George Washington Bridge became Route 1 and Route 6. Meanwhile, what had been signed as US 9 at the time was Route 4 from Absecon to Lakewood, Route 35 between Lakewood and Belmar and Eatontown and South Amboy (now Route 88 between Lakewood and Point Pleasant), Route 4N (now Route 71) between Belmar and Eatontown, Route 4 (now Route 35) between South Amboy and Rahway, Route 27 between Rahway and Newark, Route 25 between Newark and Jersey City, and Route 1 north of Jersey City.

After the Pulaski Skyway opened in 1932, US 9, along with US 1 and Route 25, was routed onto it.

The Edison bridge opened on a weekend schedule on October 11, 1940, and was opened permanently by November 15, 1940.

By the 1940s, US 9 was extended south along Route 4 to Cape May, with the small southern piece leading to US 30 in Absecon becoming an unnumbered road that is now Route 157. In addition, US 9 was moved to its current routing between South Amboy and the George Washington Bridge.

By 1947, US 9 and Route 4 were moved to a new alignment between Freehold and Old Bridge Township, with the old alignment becoming Route 4A (now Route 79 and a part of Route 34).

In 1952, the Tonnele Circle was rebuilt. Northbound traffic from TRUCK US 1/9 could now go straight through the circle. Also at that time, or possibly earlier, the offramp from Route 139 was moved to the right side, and entered the Circle where the connector to Hudson County Boulevard had. The connector was modified to only go towards the Circle. After the GSP was completed through the Toms River area that same year (south of Dover Road on June 28, north on July 3), US 9 was moved to it to bypass the center of the community and the former route became US 9 Alternate (now Route 166).

In the 1953 New Jersey state highway renumbering, the state highways running concurrent with US 9 were removed. In addition, US 1/9 Truck was created as a truck bypass of the Pulaski Skyway, replacing Route 25T, and US 1/9 Bus. (now Route 139) was signed along the former Route 25 approach to the Holland Tunnel.

In 1954, a new bridge for the GSP was built over the Mullica River at the site of the US 9 bridge; the old bridge carrying US 9 was demolished, and the route was designated to follow the GSP over the Mullica River from two interchanges. The approaches to the former bridge became Route 167, which was later unsigned. That same year, the GSP was routed over the Beasley's Point Bridge, this was done until a parament crossing could be constructed.

In 1956, after the completion of the Great Egg Harbor Bridge, the Garden State Parkway was moved off of the Beasley's Point Bridge.

In 1964, the US 9 approaches to the George Washington Bridge, which were shared with US 46 on the New Jersey side, were rebuilt into a freeway that became a part of I-95.

In the mid-1960s, a limited-access toll road called the Garden State Thruway (GST) was planned along the US 9 alignment between Toms River and Woodbridge. This freeway was intended to serve all vehicles and provide a shortcut to the GSP and US 9 through central New Jersey but was ultimately never built. In the early 1970s, another plan surfaced for a US 9 freeway from Route 34 in Madison Township (now Old Bridge Township) north to Route 35 in Sayreville. The freeway, which was to cost $17 million (equivalent to $96.4 million in 2024), was not built due to financial . A freeway was also proposed for US 9 in Atlantic County in the late 1960s, running from the proposed Route 60 freeway in Somers Point to CR 575 in Smithville. This freeway, which was to cost $35 million (equivalent to $198 million in 2024) and intended to alleviate traffic on the current US 9 and the GSP, was also never built due to financial and environmental issues.

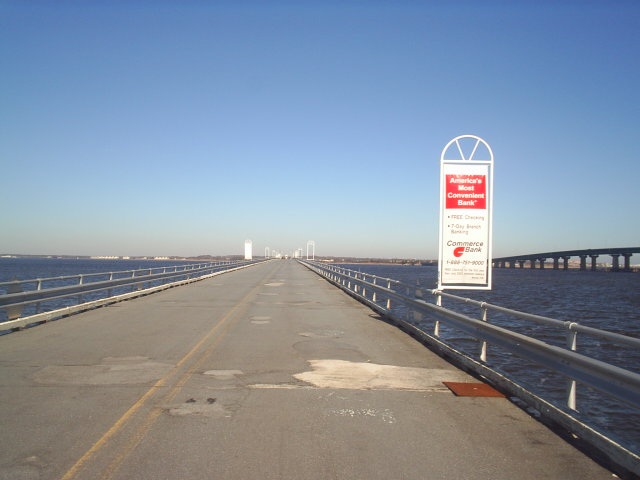
The Beesley's Point Bridge, which formerly carried US 9 over the Great Egg Harbor Bay until it was closed in 2004, and later demolished in 2013

In 1972, US 9 was relocated from its southern terminus in Cape May to head west to the Cape May–Lewes Ferry terminal in North Cape May, with the former route into Cape May becoming the current Route 109.

US 9 was extended across the ferry to US 13 in Laurel, Delaware, in 1974.

In 2001, a new span was added to the Edison Bridge over the Raritan River in a $60-million (equivalent to $101 million in 2024) modernization project, at which point the original bridge was retrofitted with a new deck and had its median removed in order to serve one direction.

The Beesley's Point Bridge over the Great Egg Harbor was closed to traffic in 2004 because of a crumbling deck caused by age and lack of maintenance, with the Beesley's Point Bridge Company unable to fund repairs. Despite this closure, US 9 was only detoured around the closure on the GSP, creating a gap. In 2008, Cape May County acquired the bridge from the Beesley's Point Bridge Company and planned to restore it by 2012, with an estimated cost of $20 million (equivalent to $28.5 million in 2024). The Beesley's Point Bridge, however, was slated to be demolished in 2013 as part of a project that replaced the 1956 Great Egg Harbor Bridge. Ghost ramps remain on both sides, though the side near GSP exit 29 has been partially demolished to make room for the Great Egg Harbor Multi-use Path.

The Tonnele Circle was given a minor upgrade in 2005. A ramp was added to permit vehicles heading southbound on Tonnele Avenue to access the Pulaski Skyway without entering the circle. Additionally, ramps around and through the circle were modified to improve traffic flow, and traffic lights were added and recalibrated to reduce the chances of cross traffic being in an intersection simultaneously.

The Victory Circle at the north end of the Route 35 concurrency in Sayreville, which had been described as functionally obsolete, was replaced with an interchange between 2003 and 2006.

In 2006, a project which reconstructed two stretches of shoulders and made improvements in signals and sidewalks for exclusive bus use during peak hours.

On December 15, 2006, a project which rebuilt the intersection with New Jersey Route 79 was completed. This project's goals included improved safety and reduced traffic congestion.

Between February 2006 and November 2008, the cloverleaf interchange with Route 35 in Woodbridge Township, which was the first cloverleaf interchange in the U.S. built in 1929 when this portion of US 9 was a part of Route 25, was replaced with a partial cloverleaf interchange, costing $34 million (equivalent to $48.5 million in 2024).

Throughout the early 2010s, the Tonelle circle was rebuilt. Changes included traffic rebuilding the overpass that carried southbound US 1-9 Truck, relocating the left turn ramp that let US 1-9 traffic to turn onto NJ 139 or U-turn, removing the 1950s era ramp that let Wittepen bridge traffic onto US 1-9 north, narrowing the circle to one lane in most areas, updating signage, lighting, and traffic lights, constructing a new exit to let southbound Us 1-9 traffic onto US 1-9 Truck to the Witpenn bridge, relocating the tonnelle avenue exit on US 1-9 south, and building a new St. Paul's Viaduct and relocateing the overpass entrances to allow NJ 7 traffic to bypass the circle and get on to US 1-9 north from the Wittpenn Bridge.

From 2004 until 2013, a gap existed on US 9. This was because the Beasley's Point Bridge was closed, and the fact that US 9 was not resigned, likely due to the bridges later canceled rehabilitation. In order to end this gap, US 9 was realigned in 2013 to follow the now decommissioned US 9 Temporary and part of Rosevelt boulevard. This new extension first turns onto CR 623 east, where it then turns right to begin a concurrency with the GSP via exit 25 in Marmora. It then crosses the Great Egg Harbor Bridge, where it enters and exits via exit 29 in Somers Point at to continue near its old northern terminus. Most signage has been updated to match. This redesignation marks the first time since the Beesley's Point Bridge's closure that it has been possible to drive the entirety of US 9, and the first time since 1956 that US 9 and the GSP have run concurrent in the area.

The East Freehold Road/Craig Road interchange was upgraded in 2016.

In March 2013, the NJTA awarded Route 52 Constructors a $129.8 million (2013 USD) contract to build the southbound replacement of the Great Egg Harbor bridge, and demolish the Beesley's Point Bridge. These were the same contractors to build the second phase of the New Jersey Route 52 replacement bridge, between Somers Point and Ocean City. Demolition of the Beesley's Point Bridge began in June 2013, and construction of the replacement southbound Parkway bridge began that September, 12 ft (3.7 m) west of the existing bridge. Hardesty & Hanover, LLP designed the new crossing. The bridge was supported by 20 piers with 3 columns each, using prestressed concrete beams. This created a wider channel than the original 1954 bridge. To test the performance of the pilings, the crew performed the first statnamic load test in the state of New Jersey. Construction crews worked to avoid disrupting migratory bird and fish species. In August 2016, the new southbound bridge opened, and in November of that year, the last part of the Beesley's Point Bridge was dismantled. The project ultimately cost $142.9 million. After the current south bridge was finished, Southbound traffic was then redirected to the current southbound bridge, at which point the original was demolished. Traffic was available on both the north bound and southbound bridges for a small amount of time, after which northbound traffic was redirected to the current southbound bridge so that the northbound bridge could undergo repairs.

In July 2016, the NJTA awarded a $49.8 million contract to rehabilitate the northbound span and demolish the old southbound bridge. The road project was completed in May 2019. After the current south bridge was finished, Southbound traffic was then redirected to the current southbound bridge, at which point the original was demolished. Traffic was available on both the north bound and southbound bridges for a small amount of time, after which northbound traffic was redirected to the current southbound bridge so that the northbound bridge could undergo repairs. On July 8, 2020, a bike and walking path opened on the southbound span, connecting Beesley's Point with US 9 in Somers Point. The northern portion in Somers Point required bikers and walkers to navigate traffic entering and exiting the Parkway, although there were plans to connect the path with the Somers Point Bike Path along US 9 and Somers Point–Mays Landing Road.

In 2011, a $588-million (equivalent to $807 million in 2024) project to widen the 7.2-mile (11.6 km) segment of US 9 between Toms River and Lakewood was slated. It began in 2021 and is anticipated to finish by 2025.

== Major intersections ==
| County | Location | mi | km | Exit | Destinations | Notes |
|---|---|---|---|---|---|---|
| Delaware Bay | | 0.00 | 0.00 | | US 9 west to DE 1 / US 13 – Delaware Beaches, Ocean City, MD, Wilmington, Annapolis | Continuation into Delaware |
| Delaware Bay | | 0.00 | 0.00 | Cape May–Lewes Ferry | | |
| Cape May | Lower Township | 3.06 | 4.92 | | Route 109 south to G.S. Parkway north | Northern terminus of Route 109 |
| Cape May | Middle Township | 7.09 | 11.41 | | Route 47 to G.S. Parkway – Goshen, Camden, Wildwood | |
| Cape May | Middle Township | 9.64 | 15.51 | | Route 147 east (North Wildwood Boulevard) to A.C. Expressway / G.S. Parkway – North Wildwood CR 618 west (Indian Trail Road) – Dias Creek | Western terminus of Route 147 |
| Cape May | Middle Township | | | | G.S. Parkway | Exit 9 on G.S. Parkway; access via Shell Bay Avenue |
| Cape May | Middle Township | | | | To G.S. Parkway | Access via CR 657 |
| Cape May | Middle Township | | | | To G.S. Parkway | Access via CR 609 |
| Cape May | Middle Township | 15.12 | 24.33 | | G.S. Parkway south | |
| Cape May | Dennis Township | 18.61 | 29.95 | | Route 83 west – South Dennis, Camden | Eastern terminus of Route 83 |
| Cape May | Dennis Township | 21.60 | 34.76 | | CR 550 west (Woodbine-Ocean View Road) to Route 55 – Woodbine | Western terminus of CR 550 |
| Cape May | Upper Township | 23.76 | 38.24 | | G.S. Parkway south / Route 50 north – Tuckahoe, Mays Landing | Exit 20 on G.S. Parkway; southern terminus of Route 50 |
| Cape May | Upper Township | 29.12 | 46.86 | Southern end of freeway section | | |
| Cape May | Upper Township | 29.12 | 46.86 | | G.S. Parkway south / CR 623 east – Ocean City | Southern end of G.S. Parkway concurrency; northern end of CR 623 concurrency |
| Great Egg Harbor Bay | | 31.55 | 50.77 | Great Egg Harbor Bridge | | |
| Atlantic | Somers Point | 32.56 | 52.40 | Great Egg Toll Plaza (southbound only) | | |
| Atlantic | Somers Point | 32.68 | 52.59 | | G.S. Parkway north | Northern end of G.S. Parkway concurrency |
| Atlantic | Somers Point | 32.68 | 52.59 | Northern end of freeway section | | |
| Atlantic | Somers Point | 33.10 | 53.27 | | CR 559 (Somers Point-Mays Landing Road) – Camden, Somers Point, Ocean City | |
| Atlantic | Somers Point | 33.69 | 54.22 | | Route 52 south (MacArthur Boulevard) – Ocean City | Northern terminus of Route 52 |
| Atlantic | Somers Point | 35.03 | 56.38 | | CR 559 Alt. (Ocean Heights Avenue) – Mays Landing | |
| Atlantic | Northfield | 38.71 | 62.30 | | CR 563 (Tilton Road) – Cologne, Margate City | |
| Atlantic | Pleasantville | 40.39 | 65.00 | | US 40 / US 322 (Black Horse Pike) to G.S. Parkway – Camden, Atlantic City | |
| Atlantic | Pleasantville | 41.20 | 66.30 | | A.C. Expressway – Philadelphia, Shore Points, Atlantic City | Exit 5 on A.C. Expressway |
| Atlantic | Absecon | 43.32 | 69.72 | | US 30 (White Horse Pike) to G.S. Parkway north – Hammonton, Atlantic City | |
| Atlantic | Absecon | 44.31 | 71.31 | | Route 157 south (Shore Road) – Atlantic City | Northern terminus of Route 157 |
| Atlantic | Galloway Township | 45.83 | 73.76 | | CR 561 north (Jimmie Leeds Road) – Egg Harbor, Camden | Southern terminus of CR 561 |
| Atlantic | Galloway Township | 48.15 | 77.49 | | CR 561 Byp. north (Smithville Boulevard) | Southern terminus of CR 561 Byp. |
| Atlantic | Galloway Township | 49.07 | 78.97 | | CR 561 Alt. (Moss Mill Road) – Hammonton, Leeds Point | |
| Atlantic | Port Republic | 52.55 | 84.57 | | CR 575 south (Chestnut Neck Road) – Port Republic, Egg Harbor City | Northern terminus of CR 575 |
| Atlantic | Port Republic | 52.68 | 84.78 | | Route 167 north (Old New York Road) | Southern terminus of the southern segment of Route 167 |
| Atlantic | Port Republic | 53.05 | 85.38 | Southern end of freeway section | | |
| Atlantic | Port Republic | 53.05 | 85.38 | | G.S. Parkway south – Atlantic City | Southern end of G.S. Parkway concurrency |
| Burlington | Bass River Township | 55.60 | 89.48 | | G.S. Parkway north – Toms River | Northern end of G.S. Parkway concurrency |
| Burlington | Bass River Township | 55.60 | 89.48 | Northern end of freeway section | | |
| Burlington | Bass River Township | 55.92 | 89.99 | | Route 167 south (Old New York Road) | Northern terminus of the northern segment of Route 167 |
| Burlington | Bass River Township | 56.58 | 91.06 | | CR 542 west (Hammonton Road) – Batsto | Eastern terminus of CR 542 |
| Ocean | Tuckerton | 63.21 | 101.73 | | CR 539 north (Green Street) / CR 603 south (Green Street) to G.S. Parkway – Allentown | Southern terminus of CR 539 |
| Ocean | Stafford Township | 71.00 | 114.26 | | Route 72 to G.S. Parkway – Long Beach Island | Interchange; access to Hackensack Meridian Health Southern Ocean Medical Center |
| Ocean | Barnegat Township | 75.58 | 121.63 | | CR 554 west (Bay Avenue) to G.S. Parkway – Medford, Camden CR 609 east (Bay Ave) | Eastern terminus of CR 554 |
| Ocean | Ocean Township | 78.62 | 126.53 | | CR 532 west (Wells Mills Rd) to G.S. Parkway – Brookville, Warren Grove, Camden CR 612 east (Bryant Rd) | Eastern terminus of CR 532 |
| Ocean | Beachwood | 90.30 | 145.32 | | Route 166 north – Toms River | Southern terminus of Route 166 |
| Ocean | South Toms River | 91.38 | 147.06 | | CR 530 (Dover Road) – Whiting, Toms River, Beachwood | |
| Ocean | South Toms River | 91.51 | 147.27 | Southern end of freeway section | | |
| Ocean | South Toms River | 91.51 | 147.27 | | G.S. Parkway south | Southern end of G.S. Parkway concurrency |
| Ocean | Toms River | 92.35 | 148.62 | 81 | CR 527 (Lakehurst Road) – Toms River | |
| Ocean | Toms River | 92.85 | 149.43 | 82 | Route 37 – Seaside Heights, Lakehurst | Signed as exits 82 (east) and 82A (west); access to Island Beach State Park |
| Ocean | Toms River | 94.96 | 152.82 | | G.S. Parkway north / Route 166 south / CR 571 – Toms River, Lakewood | Northern end of G.S. Parkway concurrency; northern terminus of Route 166 |
| Ocean | Toms River | 94.96 | 152.82 | Northern end of freeway section | | |
| Ocean | Toms River | 95.32 | 153.40 | | CR 571 (Indian Head Road) – Jackson Township, Trenton | |
| Ocean | Toms River | 99.17 | 159.60 | | Route 70 – Lakehurst, Point Pleasant | Interchange |
| Ocean | Lakewood Township | 101.93 | 164.04 | | CR 528 / CR 547 south (Central Avenue/Hurley Avenue) – Jackson, New Egypt, Mantoloking | Southern end of CR 547 concurrency |
| Ocean | Lakewood Township | 102.17 | 164.43 | | Route 88 east (Main Street) – Brick | Western terminus of Route 88 |
| Ocean | Lakewood Township | 102.27 | 164.59 | | CR 547 north (8th Street) | Northern end of CR 547 concurrency |
| Ocean | Lakewood Township | 103.32 | 166.28 | | CR 526 (County Line Road) to G.S. Parkway – Jackson, Brick | |
| Monmouth | Howell Township | 107.05 | 172.28 | | I-195 – Trenton, Shore Points | Exit 28 on I-195 |
| Monmouth | Freehold Township | 111.81 | 179.94 | | CR 524 (Elton-Adelphia Road) – Smithburg, Adelphia, Farmingdale | |
| Monmouth | Freehold Township | 113.17 | 182.13 | | Route 79 north (South Street) to Route 33 – Freehold, Matawan; Schanck Road | Southern terminus of Route 79 |
| Monmouth | Freehold Township | 113.37 | 182.45 | | Route 33 | Southbound entrance only |
| Monmouth | Freehold Borough | 114.21 | 183.80 | | CR 537 (West Main Street) – Smithburg, Freehold | Interchange |
| Monmouth | Freehold Township | 114.79 | 184.74 | | Route 33 Bus. (Park Avenue) – Trenton, Asbury Park | Former Freehold Circle |
| Monmouth | Freehold Township | 115.33 | 185.61 | | CR 522 (Throckmorton Street) – Englishtown, Freehold | Interchange |
| Monmouth | Manalapan Township | 118.99 | 191.50 | | Tennent Road / Morganville Road (CR 3) / Gordons Corner Road – Tennent, Englishtown | Interchange |
| Monmouth | Marlboro Township | 120.46 | 193.86 | | Union Hill Road | Interchange |
| Monmouth | Marlboro Township | 121.43 | 195.42 | | CR 520 (Robertsville Road) – Jamesburg, Holmdel | |
| Middlesex | Old Bridge Township | 122.56 | 197.24 | | Route 18 – Asbury Park, New Brunswick, Shore Points | Same-directional access only; exit 30 on Route 18 |
| Middlesex | Old Bridge Township | 124.50 | 200.36 | | Throckmorton Lane / Ticetown Road | Interchange |
| Middlesex | Old Bridge Township | 124.84 | 200.91 | | CR 516 – Old Bridge, Matawan | Interchange |
| Middlesex | Old Bridge Township | 127.34 | 204.93 | | Route 34 south – Matawan | Southbound exit and northbound entrance; northern terminus of Route 34 |
| Middlesex | Old Bridge Township | 127.98 | 205.96 | | Old Bridge Park & Ride, Shopping Center | Southbound exit and entrance; access via Meleta Way |
| Middlesex | Sayreville | 128.53 | 206.85 | | Ernston Road (CR 673) to Route 35 south | Interchange |
| Middlesex | Sayreville | 129.45 | 208.33 | | CR 615 (Bordentown Avenue) to Route 35 south – South Amboy, Parlin | Interchange |
| Middlesex | Sayreville | 129.79 | 208.88 | | G.S. Parkway north | Northbound exit and southbound entrance; exit 123 on G.S. Parkway |
| Middlesex | South Amboy | 130.43 | 209.91 | | Route 35 south Main Street – South Amboy | Southern end of Route 35 concurrency; interchange |
| Middlesex | South Amboy | 130.92 | 210.70 | | CR 535 south (Raritan Street) – Sayreville, Parlin | Interchange; northern terminus of CR 535 |
| Middlesex | Sayreville | 131.39 | 211.45 | | Kearney Road | Interchange |
| Middlesex | Sayreville | 131.85 | 212.19 | Southern end of freeway section | | |
| Middlesex | Sayreville | 131.85 | 212.19 | | G.S. Parkway south / Route 35 north – Perth Amboy, Soutu Amboy Business Center | Northern end of Route 35 concurrency; exit 125 on G.S. Parkway; former Victory Circle |
| Middlesex | Raritan River | 132.75 | 213.64 | Edison Bridge | | |
| Middlesex | Woodbridge Township | 133.45 | 214.77 | | Route 440 to I-287 north – Raritan Center, Perth Amboy, Staten Island | No southbound access to Route 440 north/Perth Amboy; access to Perth Amboy via CR 656 |
| Middlesex | Woodbridge Township | 133.84 | 215.39 | | New Brunswick Avenue (CR 616) – Perth Amboy, Fords | No southbound exit |
| Middlesex | Woodbridge Township | 133.84 | 215.39 | | G.S. Parkway south | Southbound exit and northbound entrance; exit 127 on G.S. Parkway |
| Middlesex | Woodbridge Township | 134.16 | 215.91 | | To N.J. Turnpike (I-95 Toll) / G.S. Parkway north | Northbound exit and southbound entrance |
| Middlesex | Woodbridge Township | 134.53 | 216.51 | | Route 184 / CR 501 to I-95 Toll / N.J. Turnpike / G.S. Parkway north – Outerbridge Crossing, Fords | I-95/G.S. Parkway not signed northbound |
| Middlesex | Woodbridge Township | 134.53 | 216.51 | Northern end of freeway section | | |
| Middlesex | Woodbridge Township | 135.67 | 218.34 | | CR 514 (Main Street) – Woodbridge | Interchange |
| Middlesex | Woodbridge Township | 136.71 | 220.01 | | US 1 south – Trenton | Southern end of US 1 concurrency; southbound exit and northbound entrance; interchange |
| Middlesex | Woodbridge Township | 137.24 | 220.87 | | Route 35 – The Amboys, Rahway | Interchange |
| Middlesex | Woodbridge Township | 138.58 | 223.02 | | South Inman Avenue / Rodgers Street | Interchange |
| Union | Rahway | 139.67 | 224.78 | | CR 514 – Rahway, Woodbridge | Southbound exit and entrance |
| Union | Linden | 143.12 | 230.33 | | I-278 east to I-95 Toll / N.J. Turnpike – Goethals Bridge, Staten Island | Interchange; northbound exit and southbound entrance; western terminus of I-278 |
| Union | Elizabeth | 143.93 | 231.63 | | Route 439 (South Elmora Avenue / Bayway Avenue) – Roselle, Plainfield, Staten Island, Goethals Bridge | Bayway Circle |
| Union | Elizabeth | 146.26 | 235.38 | Southern end of freeway section | | |
| Union | Elizabeth | 146.55 | 235.85 | | To I-95 Toll / N.J. Turnpike / Dowd Avenue – Elizabeth Seaport | Access via Route 81; no northbound exit |
| Union | Elizabeth | 146.82 | 236.28 | | Service Road | Southbound exit and entrance |
| Essex | Newark | 147.10 | 236.73 | | McClellan Street | |
| Essex | Newark | 147.57 | 237.49 | | Newark Liberty International Airport | |
| Essex | Newark | 147.92 | 238.05 | | I-78 to I-95 Toll / N.J. Turnpike | Northbound exit and southbound entrance; exits 58A-B on I-78 |
| Essex | Newark | 148.17 | 238.46 | | Haynes Avenue | |
| Essex | Newark | 148.46 | 238.92 | | US 22 west – Hillside | Eastern terminus of US 22 |
| Essex | Newark | 148.66 | 239.25 | | Route 21 north – Downtown Newark | Southern terminus of Route 21 |
| Essex | Newark | 148.82 | 239.50 | | South Area | Northbound exit and entrance |
| Essex | Newark | 148.82 | 239.50 | | Executive Drive | Southbound exit and entrance |
| Essex | Newark | 149.42 | 240.47 | | Port Newark, North Area, South Area | |
| Essex | Newark | 149.72 | 240.95 | | I-78 to I-95 Toll / N.J. Turnpike / G.S. Parkway | |
| Essex | Newark | 149.82 | 241.11 | | Frontage Road | |
| Essex | Newark | 150.37 | 242.00 | | Delancy Street – Newark | Northbound exit and southbound entrance |
| Essex | Newark | 150.73 | 242.58 | | Wilson Avenue – Newark | Southbound exit and northbound entrance |
| Essex | Newark | 152.25 | 245.02 | | I-95 Toll / N.J. Turnpike / US 1-9 Truck north | Northbound exit and southbound entrance; all trucks must exit; southern terminus of US 1-9 Truck; exit 15E on I-95 / Turnpike |
| Essex | Newark | 152.25 | 245.02 | | Raymond Boulevard – Newark | Southbound exit and southbound entrance |
| Passaic River | | 152.67 | 245.70 | Pulaski Skyway | | |
| Hudson | Kearny | 153.15 | 246.47 | | South Kearny | Southbound exit and northbound entrance; access via Adams Street |
| Hudson | Hackensack River | 153.88 | 247.65 | Pulaski Skyway | | |
| Hudson | Jersey City | 154.82 | 249.16 | | Broadway | Northbound exit and southbound entrance |
| Hudson | Jersey City | 155.43 | 250.14 | | US 1-9 Truck south / Route 139 east / Tonnele Avenue to Route 7 west – Hoboken, Jersey City, Holland Tunnel | Tonnele Circle; no northbound access to US 1-9 Truck; all trucks must exit |
| Hudson | Jersey City | 155.43 | 250.14 | Northern end of freeway section | | |
| Hudson | Jersey City | 157.06 | 252.76 | | Secaucus Road (CR 678) – Jersey City | Interchange |
| Hudson | North Bergen | 158.09 | 254.42 | | Route 3 west / Route 495 to I-95 Toll / N.J. Turnpike – Clifton, Lincoln Tunnel | No northbound entrance; eastern terminus of Route 3 |
| Hudson | North Bergen | 158.56 | 255.18 | | Paterson Plank Road (CR 681) / West Side Avenue / Union Turnpike (CR 676) | Interchange |
| Bergen | Ridgefield | 162.96 | 262.26 | | Route 93 north (Grand Avenue) | Northbound exit and southbound entrance |
| Bergen | Ridgefield | 163.34 | 262.87 | | Route 5 east | Western terminus of Route 5 |
| Bergen | Palisades Park | 163.62 | 263.32 | | US 46 west to I-95 Toll south / N.J. Turnpike south / I-80 west | Interchange; southern end of US 46 concurrency |
| Bergen | Palisades Park | 164.33 | 264.46 | | CR 501 (East Central Boulevard) – Palisades Park | Interchange; access via 5th/6th Streets |
| Bergen | Fort Lee | 164.77 | 265.17 | | Route 63 south (Bergen Boulevard) | Interchange; southbound exit and northbound entrance; northern terminus of Route 63 |
| Bergen | Fort Lee | 165.31 | 266.04 | | Main Street (CR 56) – Fort Lee, Leonia | Interchange |
| Bergen | Fort Lee | 165.70 | 266.67 | Southern end of freeway section | | |
| Bergen | Fort Lee | 165.70 | 266.67 | | US 9W north / Route 4 west to Palisades Parkway north – Fort Lee | Northbound exit and southbound entrance; Route 4 not signed |
| Bergen | Fort Lee | 166.12 | 267.34 | 72B | I-95 south / N.J. Turnpike south / Route 4 west to I-80 west / G.S. Parkway – Hackensack, Paterson | Southbound exit and northbound entrance; southern end of I-95 concurrency; northern terminus of N.J. Turnpike; eastern terminus of Route 4 |
| Bergen | Fort Lee | 166.28 | 267.60 | 73 | Route 67 / Hudson Terrace (CR 505) to US 9W / Palisades Parkway north – Fort Lee | Signed for US 9W/Hudson Terrace southbound, Palisades northbound; last northbound exit before toll |
| Bergen | Fort Lee | 166.42 | 267.83 | 74 | Palisades Parkway north | Southbound exit and northbound entrance from express lanes; southern terminus of Palisades Parkway |
| Hudson River | | 166.80 | 268.44 | George Washington Bridge (northbound toll; Pay-by-Plate or E-ZPass) | | |
| Hudson River | | 166.80 | 268.44 | | I-95 north / US 1-9 north – New York City US 46 ends | Continuation into New York at the river's center; eastern terminus of US 46 |
1.000 mi = 1.609 km; 1.000 km = 0.621 mi: Concurrency terminus; Incomplete access; Tolled

== Related routes ==
There is one remaining special route of US 9 in the state of New Jersey:

- U.S. Route 1/9 Truck in Jersey City

The following state highways were also formerly designated as bannered spurs of US 9:

- Route 139 in Jersey City was formerly US 1/9 Bus.
- Route 166 in Toms River was formerly US 9 Alt.

Additionally, the following state highways are former alignments of US 9:

- Route 109 in Cape May
- Route 157 in Absecon
- Route 167 near Bass River

== In popular culture ==
US 9 in New Jersey is mentioned in the Bruce Springsteen song "Born to Run": "Sprung from cages on Highway 9 / Chrome-wheeled, fuel-injected and steppin' out over the line".

== See also ==
U.S. Route 9
| Previous state: Delaware | New Jersey | Next state: New York |
