= Beesley's Point Bridge =

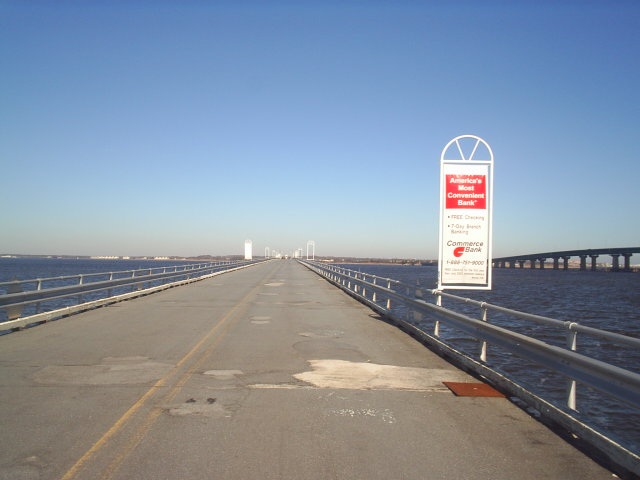
- The Beesley's Point Bridge heading north
- Coordinates: 39°17′33.9″N 74°37′33.8″W
- Carries: 2 lanes of US 9
- Crosses: Great Egg Harbor Bay
- Maintained by: Cape May County Bridge Commission

Characteristics
- Design: Causeway
- Total length: 4,800 ft (1,500 m)

History
- Opened: June 16, 1928
- Closed: 2004 (demolished 2013–2016)

Location
- Interactive map of Beesley's Point Bridge

The Beesley's Point Bridge was a bridge in New Jersey, United States, that was built privately by the Ocean City Automobile Club in 1927. Completed in 1928, control of the bridge was acquired by the Beesley's Point Bridge Company. It was a toll bridge from its opening. Prior to its closing, it was best known for carrying U.S. Route 9 (US 9) over the Great Egg Harbor Bay, connecting Upper Township, in Cape May County to Somers Point in Atlantic County. Route 9 and the Garden State Parkway temporally concurred over the Beesley's Point Bridge from the Parkway's opening in 1954 until a separate bridge over the bay for the Parkway, the Great Egg Harbor Bridge, opened in 1955.

Through the decades, the Beesley's Point Bridge Company became unable to fund repairs on the aging bridge. In 1997, the bridge company, in conjunction with private outside investors, secured a $1 million loan from the New Jersey Department of Transportation to fund the necessary improvements in exchange for a promise that they would continue to keep the bridge open until 2016.

In 2004, the owners of the bridge broke that promise realizing that the repairs would cost many times more than the original estimate. As a result, the Company agreed to close the bridge and it closed to traffic on June 18, 2004.

After the bridge closed, US 9 was not re-routed, and as such was rendered incomplete. This remained unchanged until 2013, when the permanent US 9 was realigned to follow the decommissioned US 9 temporary's former routing to once again concur with the Garden State Parkway, allowing the direct connection of US 9 within the state boundaries of New Jersey for the first time since the bridge's closure.

== History ==
In 1928, the Ocean City Automobile Club financed the construction of the Beesley's Point Bridge, connecting Somers Point to Beesley's Point via the Great Egg Harbor Bay.

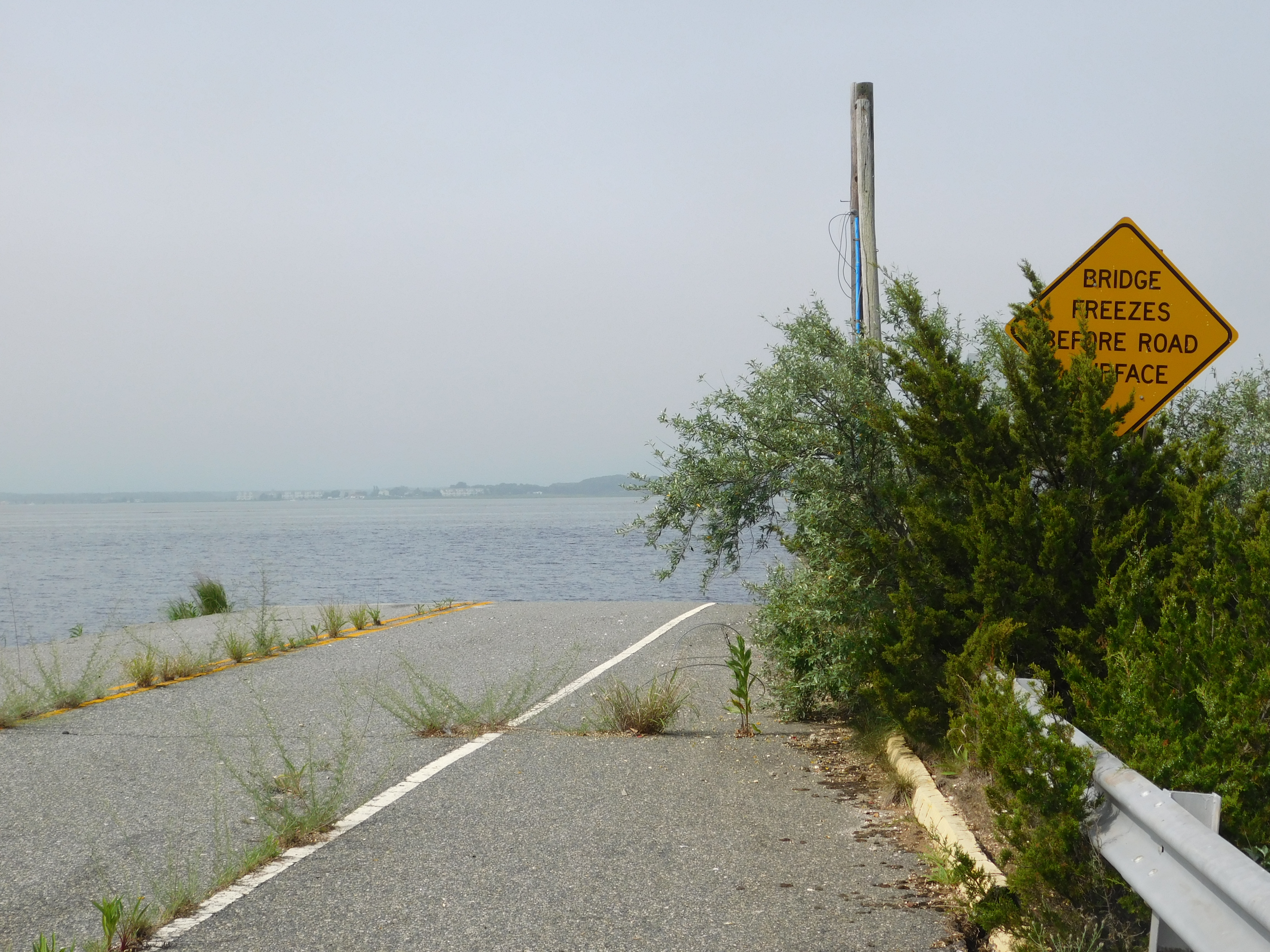
The remnants of the Beesley's Point Bridge in June 2018

In 2006, Hurricane Ernesto made Cape May County officials nervous because they lacked the use of the bridge as an additional evacuation route. As a result, Cape May County purchased the bridge from the Beesley's Point Bridge Company for $1 with the intent of rehabilitating it and opening it in 2012. Several studies were commissioned regarding the feasibility of doing so, but Cape May County engineers concluded that significant rehabilitation would extend the bridge's life by no more than 15 years. Estimates of the price of rehabilitation varied, but it appeared that a lifespan of just 15 years on the investment would not be worth the cost.

The NJDOT planned to fund a project to rehabilitate the bridge to last at least to 2019 in their Statewide Transportation Program 2011-2019.

Cape May County officials, including Jeff Van Drew, stated that bridge rehabilitation would begin in mid-2010 and the bridge would reopen to traffic in 2012. On June 28, 2010 The Press of Atlantic City article revealed that a previous crack in the existing deck had turned into a 3 ft (0.91 m) chasm.

At the 7th Annual Cape May County Transportation Infrastructure Conference on February 22, 2011, it was announced that the bridge would be demolished but discussions were in the preliminary mode. Demolition of the bridge began in July 2013 in conjunction with a project that also replaced the Great Egg Harbor Bridge.

On September 7, 2016 the toll bridge section caught fire. The last section of the bridge was demolished on November 18, 2016.

== Design ==
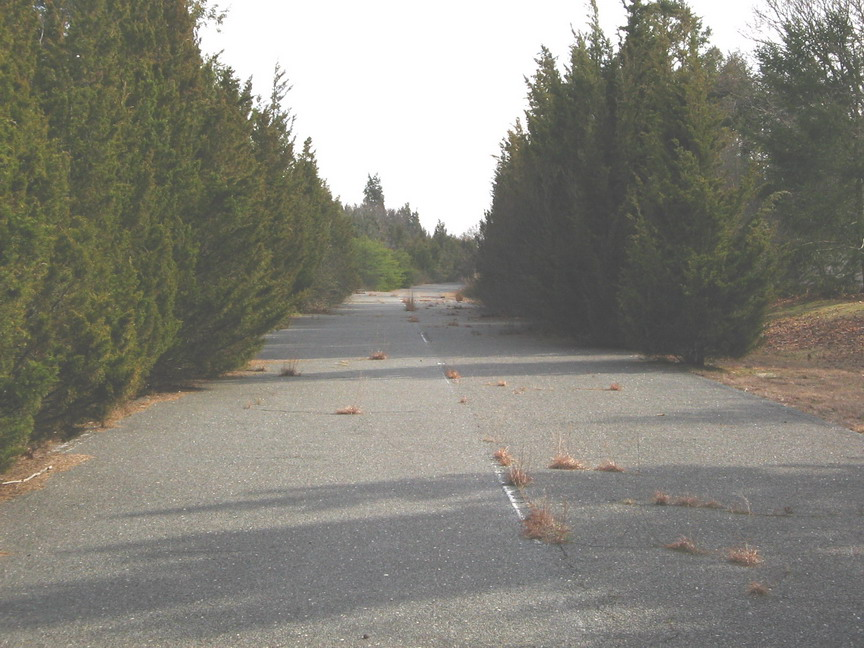
The old alignment of US 9 and the Garden State Parkway at the Beesley's Point Bridge heading southbound. The center line is white (instead of yellow).

The bridge carried two lanes of traffic for approximately 4,800 feet (1,500 m). The structure immediately north over the Drag Channel was a separate structure and is commonly referred to incorrectly as the same structure resulting in an erroneous 6,000-foot (1,800 m) total length.

The bridge contained 120 spans and had an 80-foot (24 m) double leaf bascule span that opened for maritime traffic. The official NJDOT Historic Bridge Survey states that the substructure had been heavily reconstructed. The bascule span received modern controls and electrical systems during the rehabilitation. Access to the mechanical rooms were denied for the final bridge inspection, but topside inspection revealed that the bascule appears heavily altered and thus is not eligible for historic preservation.
