= Great Egg Harbor Bridge =

Bridges in New Jersey, United States

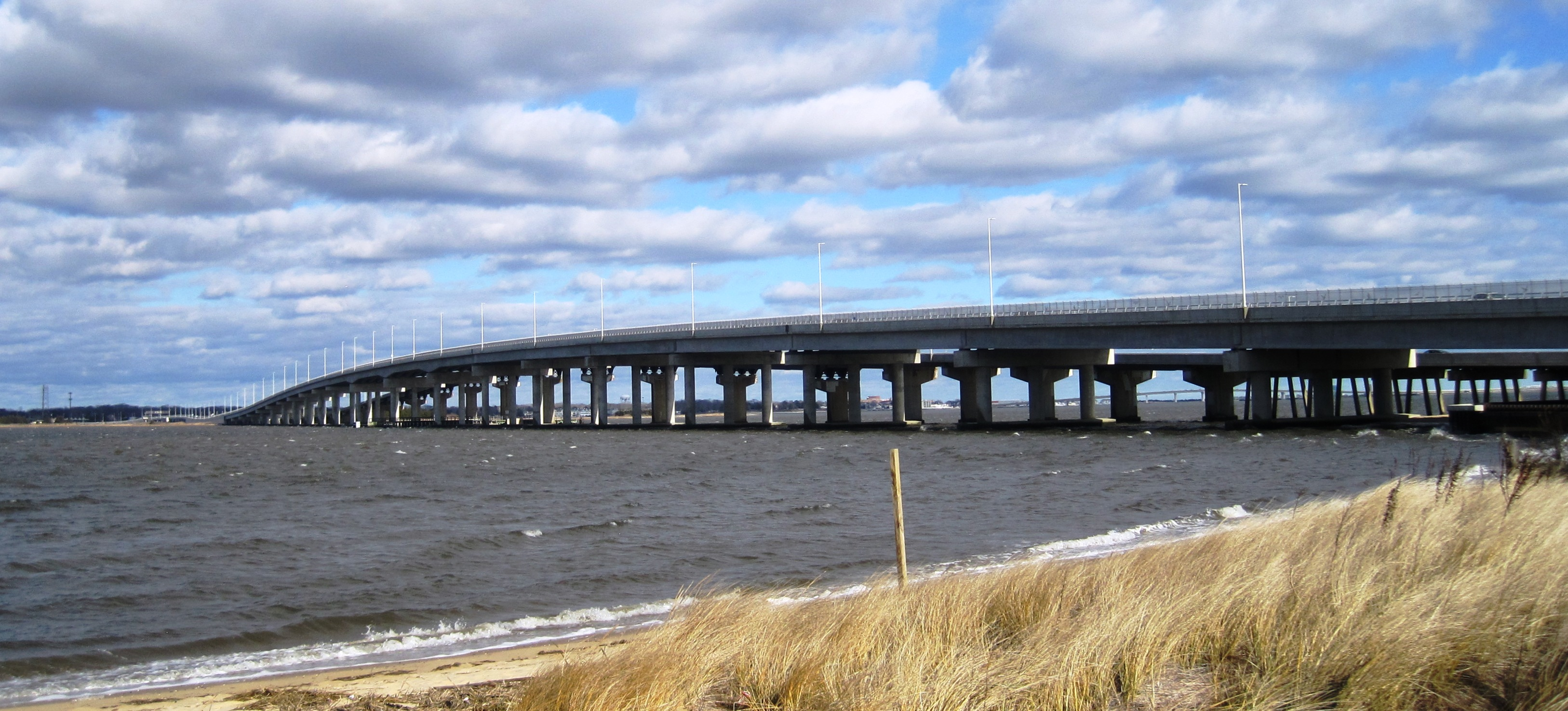
- Looking northeast from the Upper Township shore, the 2016 bridge is in the foreground, the modern 1972 bridge in the background
- Coordinates: 39°17′35″N 74°37′21″W
- Carries: 4 lanes of G.S. Parkway / US 9
- Crosses: Great Egg Harbor Bay
- Maintained by: New Jersey Turnpike Authority

Characteristics
- Design: Causeway
- Total length: 1.47 miles (2.37 km)

History
- Opened: 1956 (original southbound); 1972 (northbound); 2016 (replacement southbound); 2019 (modernized northbound)

Statistics
- Toll: $2.40 for cars with cash; $2.25 for cars with E-ZPass (southbound only)

Location
- Interactive map of Great Egg Harbor Bridge

The Great Egg Harbor Bridge is a series of four bridges along the Garden State Parkway in New Jersey. It crosses the Great Egg Harbor Bay, connecting Upper Township in Cape May County to Somers Point in Atlantic County. The bridge also crosses parts of Egg Harbor Township and Drag Island. It has carried a portion of U.S. Route 9 since 2013. Tolls are collected in the southbound direction.

== Description ==
The Garden State Parkway is a tolled limited-access highway that serves as the primary route connecting the Jersey Shore to points north and south in New Jersey. Upper Township in Cape May County connects with Somers Point via the Great Egg Harbor Bridge on the Parkway. This bridge first crosses over Harbor Road, which is the last street in Beesley's Point, connecting homes along Great Egg Harbor Bay and Peck Bay to U.S. Route 9. The bridge then crosses Great Egg Harbor Bay to Drag Island, which it crosses as a causeway. A small portion of the bridge enters Egg Harbor Township. Another bridge crosses Drag Channel to the mainland of Atlantic County in Somers Point.

Like the rest of the Garden State Parkway, the bridge is a component of the National Highway System, a network of roadways that are important to the country's economy, defense, and mobility. The bridge carries two lanes of traffic in each direction. The bridge is used heavily in the summertime, peaking on Saturdays.

== History ==
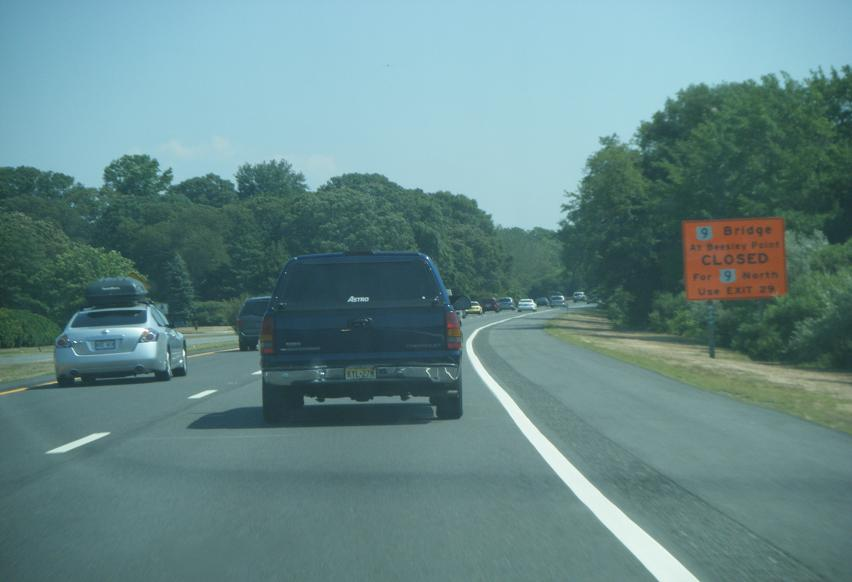
Northbound Garden State Parkway heading towards the bridge

In 1952, the New Jersey Highway Authority (NJHA) was created to facilitate the construction of the Garden State Parkway. In October 1954, the NJHA received bids for constructing a 3,650-foot (1,110 m) bridge crossing the Great Egg Harbor Bay, beginning at Beesley's Point, as well as a 750-foot (230 m) bridge crossing Drag Channel. The bridges would be linked by a causeway, and form a part of the Garden State Parkway. In construction, the bridge project used 140 prestressed concrete beams, each 40 feet (12 m) in length, at an individual cost of $640 (equivalent to $7,673 in 2025). The project also used a concrete deck at the cost of less than $2 per square foot. On May 26, 1956, the Great Egg Harbor Bridge opened at a cost of US$4.5 million, completing the Garden State Parkway.

The bridge carried traffic in both directions, but soon was unable to accommodate the increasing traffic. A parallel bridge carrying northbound traffic was opened in 1972.

In 1999, the northbound span was closed for seven weeks after cracks were found in the steel hangars.

In 2000, after cracking was found in the steel supports on the southbound bridge, construction crews made emergency repairs at the cost of $900,000 (equivalent to about $1,683,000 in 2025).

A 2002 study by the NJDOT Bridge Management System indicated that both the northbound and southbound bridges over Great Egg Harbor were structurally deficient, and the crossing of Drag Channel was functionally obsolete. A traffic study in 2004 identified poor pavement on the bridge. To address the structural deficiency along substandard roadway, and to maintain a proper evacuation route, the New Jersey Turnpike Authority (NJTA) proposed a replacement bridge as early as 2010. The NJTA worked with the United States Coast Guard as the lead federal agency for the project due to the crossing over a navigable roadway. The proposed project would construct a new southbound bridge, wide enough to carry traffic in both directions in the event of an emergency, as well as carrying a multi-use pedestrian and bike path from US 9 in Somers Point to Harbor Road. Included in the project was demolishing the Beesley's Point Bridge, built in 1928, and closed to traffic in June 2004 due to damage. On September 20, 2012, the NJTA held a public meeting in Upper Township about the proposed bridge.

In March 2013, the NJTA awarded Route 52 Constructors a $129.8 million (2013 USD) contract to build the southbound replacement bridge, and demolish the Beesley's Point Bridge. These were the same contractors to build the second phase of the New Jersey Route 52 replacement bridge, between Somers Point and Ocean City. Demolition of the Beesley's Point Bridge began in June 2013, and construction of the replacement southbound Parkway bridge began that September, 12 ft (3.7 m) west of the existing bridge. Hardesty & Hanover, LLP designed the new crossing. The bridge was supported by 20 piers with 3 columns each, using prestressed concrete beams. This created a wider channel than the original 1954 bridge. To test the performance of the pilings, the crew performed the first statnamic load test in the state of New Jersey. Construction crews worked to avoid disrupting migratory bird and fish species. In August 2016, the new southbound bridge opened, and in November of that year, the last part of the Beesley's Point Bridge was dismantled. The project ultimately cost $142.9 million. After the current south bridge was finished, Southbound traffic was then redirected to the current southbound bridge, at which point the original was demolished. Traffic was available on both the north bound and southbound bridges for a small amount of time, after which northbound traffic was redirected to the current southbound bridge so that the northbound bridge could undergo repairs.

In July 2016, the NJTA awarded a $49.8 million contract to rehabilitate the northbound span and demolish the old southbound bridge. The road project was completed in May 2019. After the current south bridge was finished, Southbound traffic was then redirected to the current southbound bridge, at which point the original was demolished. Traffic was available on both the north bound and southbound bridges for a small amount of time, after which northbound traffic was redirected to the current southbound bridge so that the northbound bridge could undergo repairs. On July 8, 2020, a bike and walking path opened on the southbound span, connecting Beesley's Point with US 9 in Somers Point. The northern portion in Somers Point required bikers and walkers to navigate traffic entering and exiting the Parkway, although there were plans to connect the path with the Somers Point Bike Path along US 9 and Somers Point–Mays Landing Road.
