= New Jersey Route 167 =

Highway in New Jersey, United States

Route 167
- Route 167 highlighted in red; decommissioned section in pink

Route information
- Maintained by NJDOT
- Length: 0.77 mi (1,240 m) 2 sections
- Existed: 1953–present

Southern section
- Length: 0.62 mi (1,000 m)
- South end: US 9 in Port Republic
- North end: Dead end in Port Republic

Northern section
- Length: 0.15 mi (240 m)
- South end: Dead end in Bass River Township
- North end: US 9 in Bass River Township

Location
- Country: United States
- State: New Jersey
- Counties: Atlantic, Burlington

Highway system
- New Jersey State Highway Routes; Interstate; US; State; Scenic Byways
| ← Route 166 | → Route 168 |

Route 167 is a short, 0.77-mile-long (1.24 km) state highway in Atlantic and Burlington counties in New Jersey. The route is one of the few discontinuous state highways in New Jersey, split by wetlands, the Garden State Parkway and the Mullica River. Although the alignment is registered by the New Jersey Department of Transportation as 2.76 miles (4.44 km) highway, the amount of roadway is considerably shorter. The route begins at an intersection with U.S. Route 9 (US 9) in Port Republic, where it continues along Old New York Road to an end of roadway at the Parkway embankment. Across the Mullica River, Route 167 continues at a gate for wetlands, heading northward to an intersection with US 9 in Bass River Township.

The route originated as part of New Jersey Route 4 during construction of a new state highway in 1917. Route 4 was built northward to the current Route 167 northern terminus in 1926, which was designated as part of US 9 that year. The highway was 2.64 miles (4.25 km) long and included an iron truss bridge. The route remained intact until construction of the Garden State Parkway and a new bridge over the Mullica River in the early 1950s. When the bridge was finished, US 9 was realigned off the roadway and the prior alignment became Route 167 during the New Jersey state highway renumbering. The route was split twice since 1953, first by the removal of the old Mullica River bridge in 1962 as part of a sale to the National Park Service for a refuge in Virginia, then the northern portion was dismantled except for a 0.12-mile-long (0.19 km) alignment for a wetland mitigation project. Today, the route remains split and the road is still maintained by the state. Most of the route is unsigned with the exception of mile markers at its southern terminus which acknowledge the route's existence.

== Route description ==
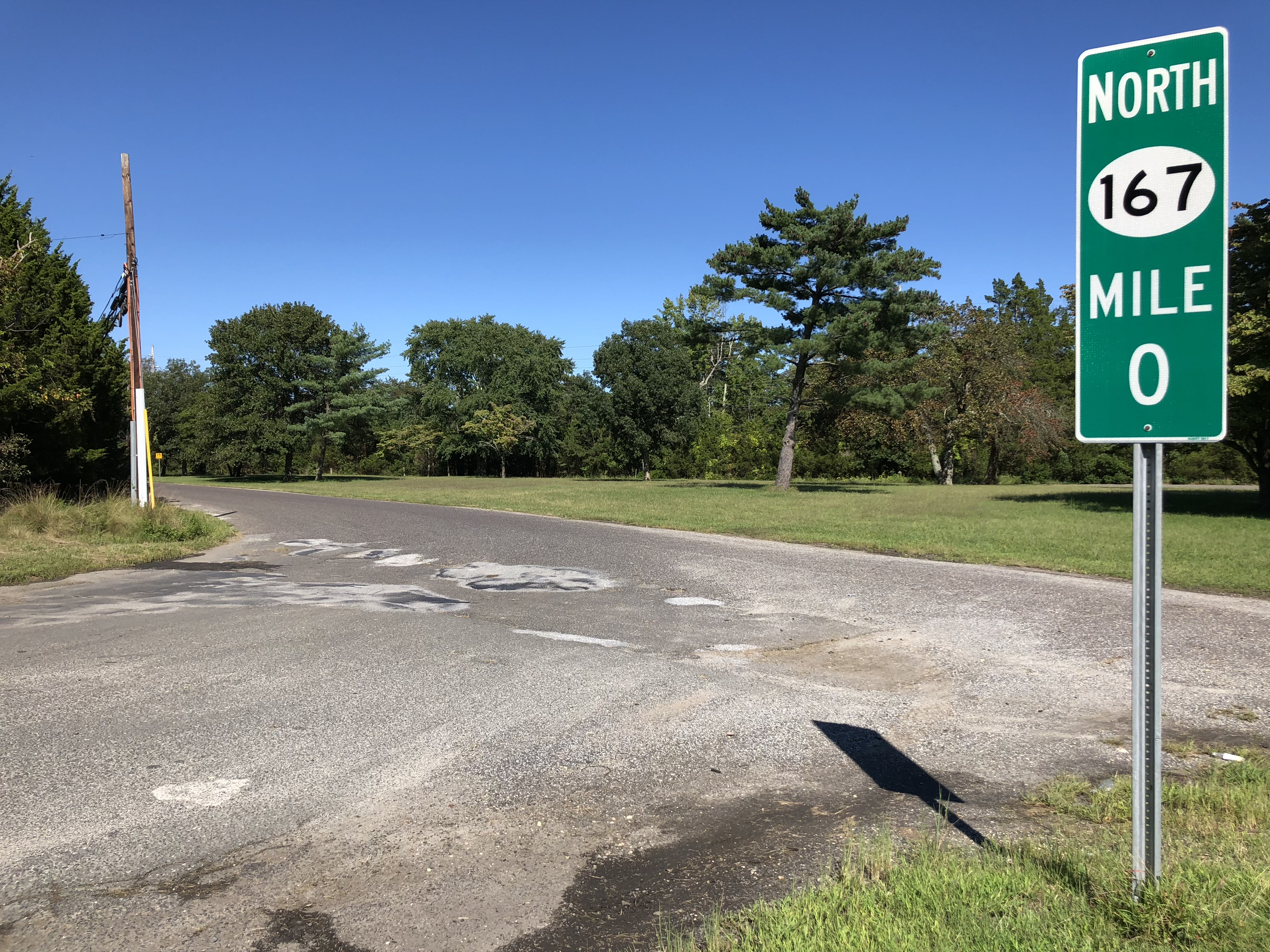
Route 167 northbound near one of the few signs designating the highway, a milepost marker in Port Republic

Route 167's southern terminus is located at an intersection with US 9 (New York Road) in the city of Port Republic. The route then intersects with the original alignment of New York Road, now known today as Old New York Road. Route 167 crosses over a stream, intersecting a privately maintained roadway soon after. The route approaches the Garden State Parkway, but ends at a gate and embankment nearby.

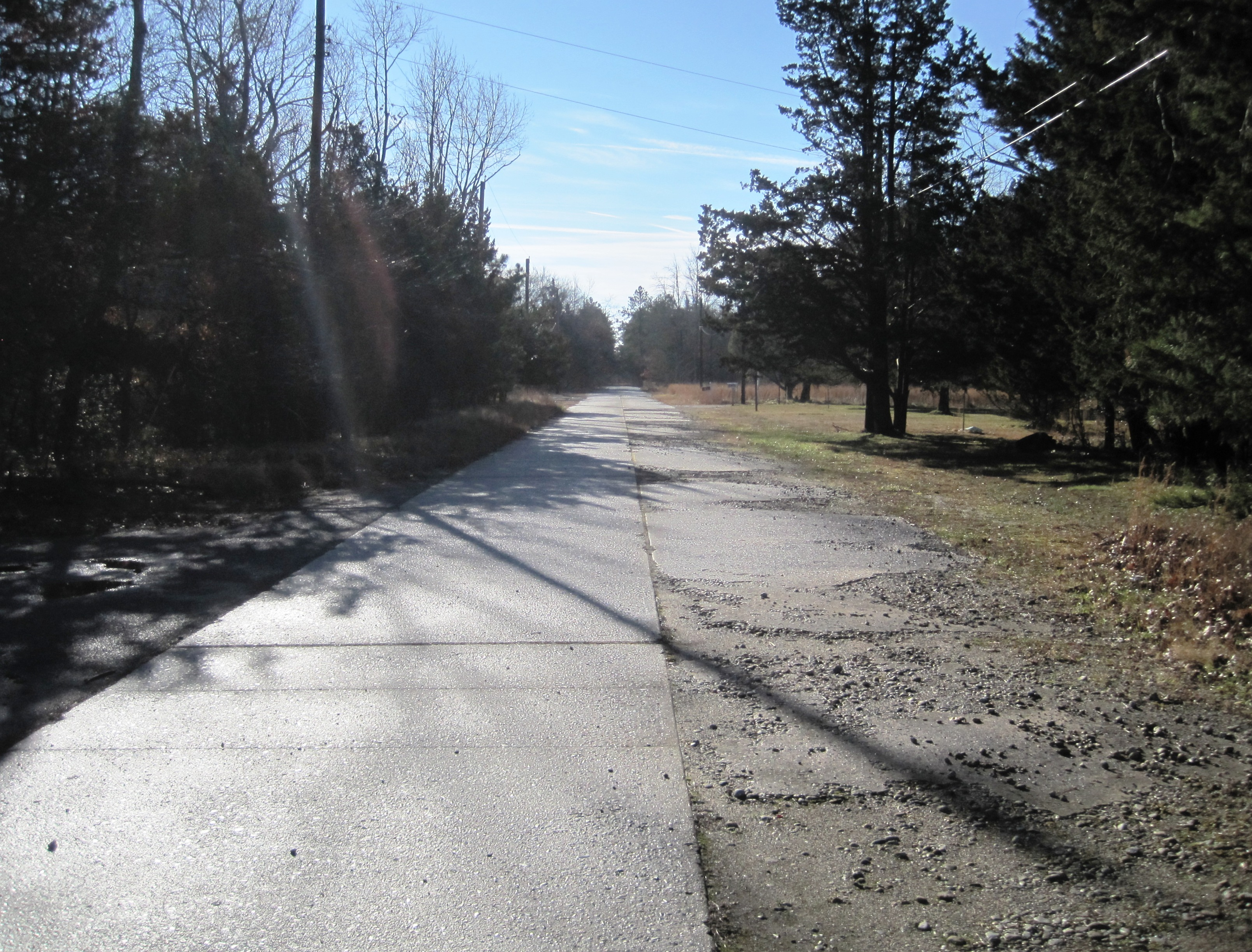
Overview of the open northern segment looking south

After a 1.99-mile (3.20 km) gap in the roadway, which consists of a former bridge over the Mullica River dismantled and moved to Virginia, bridges removed for wetlands mitigation in the marshes just north, and the orphaned roads in between (which are visible from the Garden State Parkway to the west), Route 167 resurfaces in Bass River Township as a short dead-end street only approximately 800 ft (0.24 km) long, serving only a few homes. The route intersects Bogan Lane and comes to an end at an intersection with US 9. The route's official speed limit, which is not signed, is 25 mph (40 km/h) at its southern segment and 50 mph (80 km/h) in its northern segment. However the Straight Line Diagrams produced by the Department of Transportation list the southern segment as 25 miles per hour (40 km/h) and the northern as 20 miles per hour (32 km/h).

== History ==
Route 167 originates as a part of New Jersey Route 4 from Absecon to Rahway, designated in the 1920s. The route remained intact for several years, receiving the co-designation of US 9 in 1926, when the nationwide system was assigned. In 1927, the New Jersey State Highway Department had a statewide state highway renumbering, extending Route 4 in both directions. The two routes remained intact until Route 4 was truncated to Bergen County during the 1953 state highway renumbering.) The roadway itself remained until construction of the Garden State Parkway's tenth section from New Jersey Route 43 in Absecon to Dover Road in 1954. In August of that year, a bridge over the Mullica River for the Parkway, onto which US 9 was realigned, was completed, replacing the alignment over the old structure. During construction, Route 4 and US 9 were realigned onto a temporary alignment to the older structure, while the old one remained unnumbered.

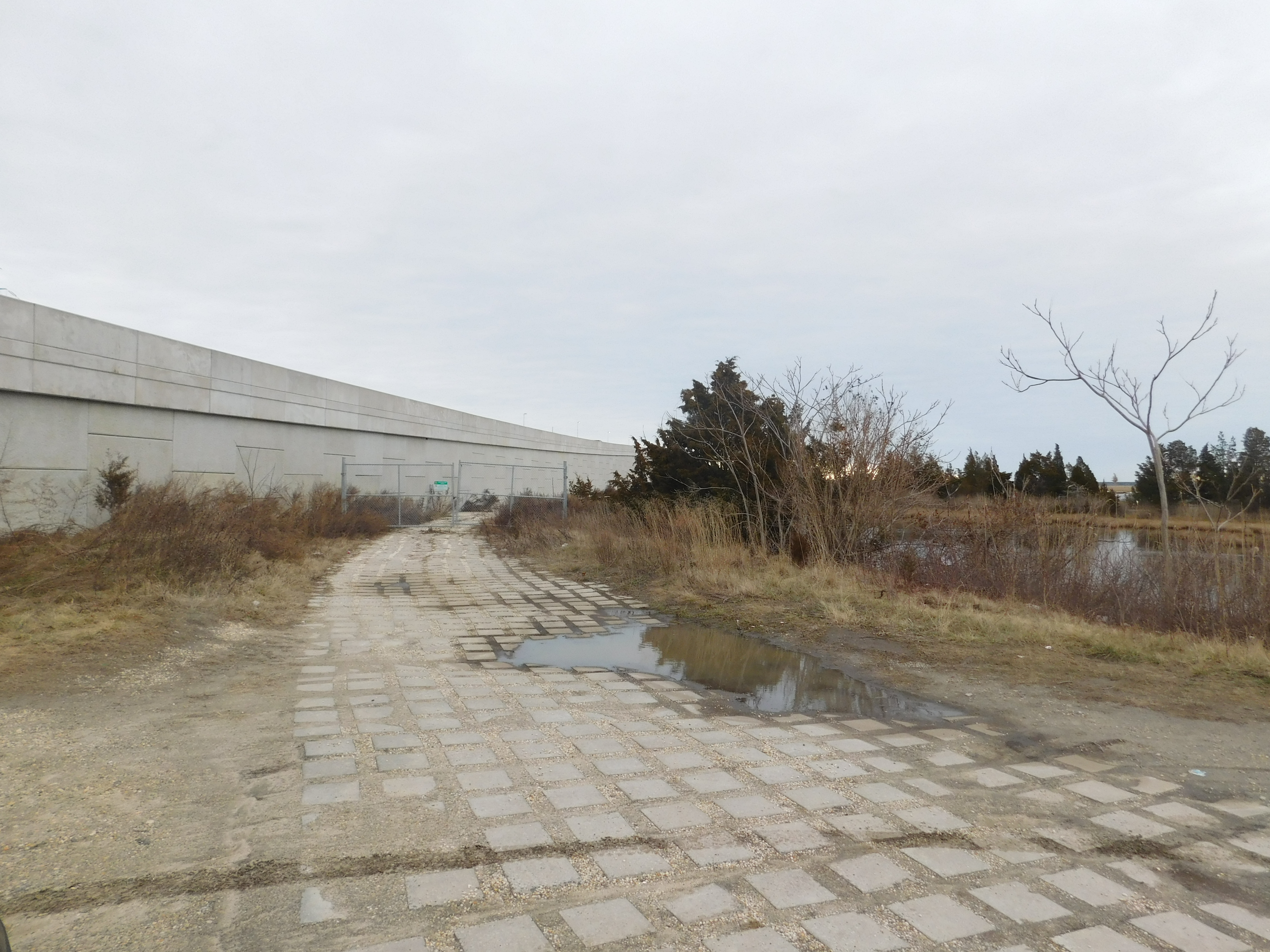
Route 167 approaching the embankment of the Garden State Parkway in Port Republic

Upon the realignment of US 9, the State Highway Department renumbered the former alignment as Route 167. The route, originally 55 feet (17 m) wide, was shortened during the construction of the new alignments, which also involved taking homes and properties from the highway. The former portion became a gravel road upon completion in Port Republic. Route 167 now continued along the former alignment, using the iron truss bridge built in 1917 for Route 4 to the intersection with US 9 in Bass River Township. The old iron truss bridge lasted several years after the realignment, lasting past 1960. The truss bridge was dismantled in 1962, and sold to the state of Virginia and the National Park Service for the National Wildlife Refuge. The route remained intact for a couple decades, with a gap in the highway. The State Highway Department registered the alignment of Route 167 in 1969 as 2.64 miles (4.25 km) long, although there was a gap in the roadway.

The route's northern half from the Mullica River, constructed in 1926 as part of Route 4, was dismantled in 1984 for Edwin B. Forsythe National Wildlife Refuge. As of 2007, Route 167 is unsigned, running from US 9 in Port Republic to the bank of the Garden State Parkway at the Mullica River Bridge on its south side and from US 9 to a gate on the north side. The straight line diagrams also mention the length of the roadway being 2.76 miles (4.44 km) long, although only 0.77 miles (1.24 km) is still accessible roadway.

== Major intersections ==
| County | Location | mi | km | Destinations | Notes |
|---|---|---|---|---|---|
| Atlantic | Port Republic | 0.00 | 0.00 | US 9 | Southern terminus |
| Atlantic | Port Republic | 0.62 | 1.00 | Dead end | Northern terminus |
Gap in route
| Burlington | Bass River Township | 2.61 | 4.20 | Dead end | Southern terminus |
| Burlington | Bass River Township | 2.76 | 4.44 | US 9 | Northern terminus |
1.000 mi = 1.609 km; 1.000 km = 0.621 mi
