= Beesley's Point, New Jersey =

Populated place in Cape May County, New Jersey, US

- Census-designated place
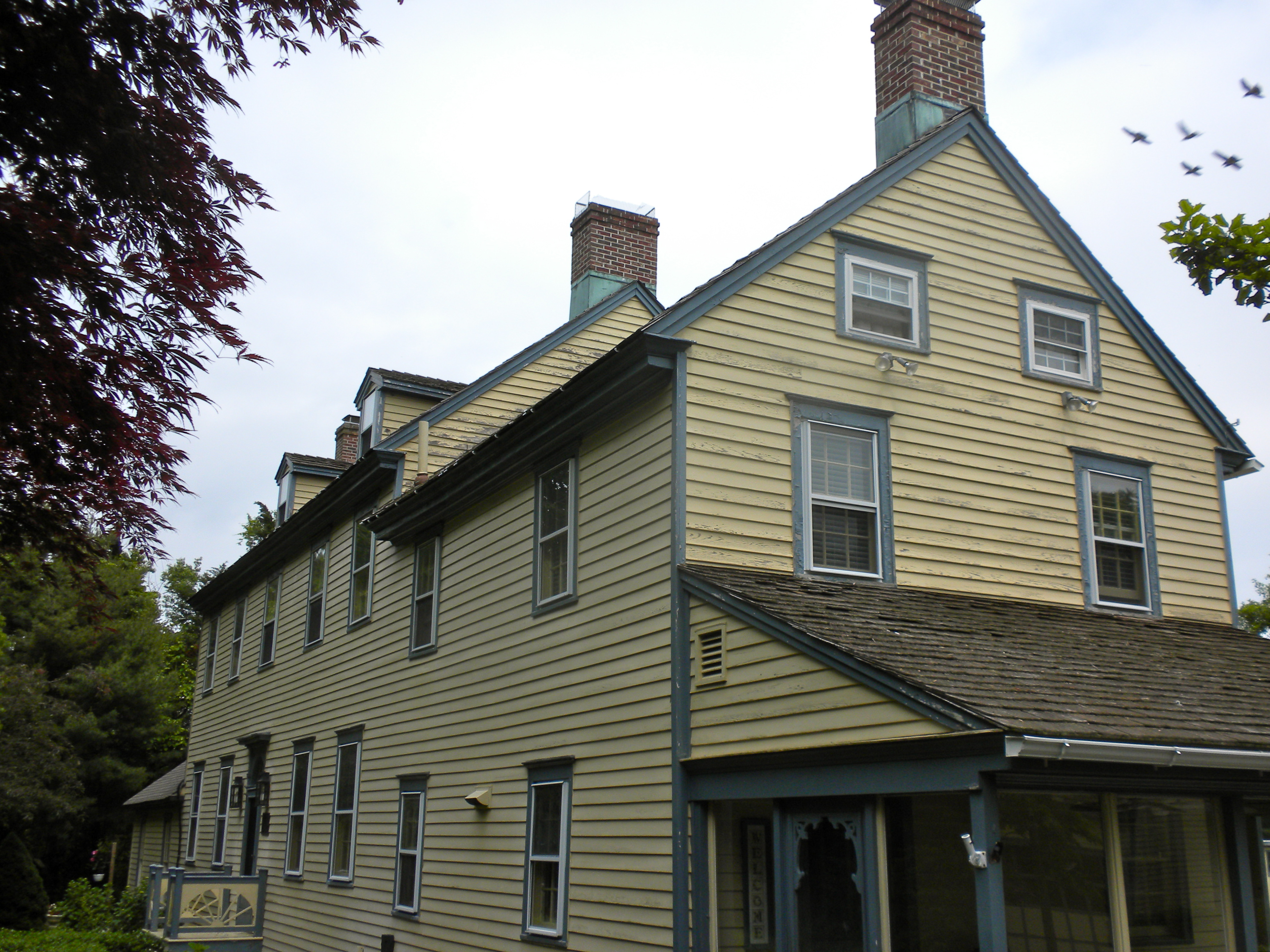
- Thomas Beesley Sr. House

- Location in Cape May County Location in New Jersey Location in the United States
- Coordinates: 39°16′36″N 74°38′11″W
- Country: United States
- State: New Jersey
- County: Cape May
- Township: Upper

Area
  - Total: 2.16 sq mi (5.59 km^{2})
  - Land: 2.13 sq mi (5.51 km^{2})
  - Water: 0.031 sq mi (0.08 km^{2})
- Elevation: 30 ft (9.1 m)

Population (2020)
  - Total: 816
  - Density: 383.4/sq mi (148.02/km^{2})
- Time zone: UTC−05:00 (Eastern (EST))
  - Summer (DST): UTC−04:00 (Eastern (EDT))
- Area codes: 609, 640
- FIPS code: 34-04540
- GNIS feature ID: 2806232

Beesley's Point is an unincorporated community and census-designated place (CDP) in Upper Township, in Cape May County, in the U.S. state of New Jersey. Beesley's Point is on Peck Bay across from Ocean City. Beesley's Point is home to the Beesley's Point Generating Station and one end of the now-closed Beesley's Point Bridge.

It was first listed as a CDP in the 2020 census with a population of 816.

A post office was established in 1851, with Joseph Chatten as the first postmaster.

== Demographics ==
Historical population
Census	Pop.	Note	%±
2020	816		—
U.S. Decennial Census; 2020

Beesley's Point first appeared as a census designated place in the 2020 U.S. census.

=== 2020 census ===
Beesley's Point CDP, New Jersey – Racial and ethnic composition Note: the US Census treats Hispanic/Latino as an ethnic category. This table excludes Latinos from the racial categories and assigns them to a separate category. Hispanics/Latinos may be of any race.
Race / Ethnicity (NH = Non-Hispanic)	Pop 2020	% 2020
White alone (NH)	723	88.60%
Black or African American alone (NH)	2	0.25%
Native American or Alaska Native alone (NH)	2	0.25%
Asian alone (NH)	5	0.61%
Native Hawaiian or Pacific Islander alone (NH)	1	0.12%
Other race alone (NH)	3	0.37%
Mixed race or Multiracial (NH)	30	3.68%
Hispanic or Latino (any race)	50	6.13%
Total	816	100.00%

== Education ==
As with other parts of Upper Township, the area is zoned to Upper Township School District (for grades K-8) and Ocean City School District (for high school). The latter operates Ocean City High School.

Countywide schools include Cape May County Technical High School and Cape May County Special Services School District.

The community had once had its own school.
