= 1927 New Jersey state highway renumbering =

This article is part of the highway renumbering series.
Alabama	1928, 1957
Arkansas	1926
California	1964
Colorado	1953, 1968
Connecticut	1932, 1963
Florida	1945
Indiana	1926
Iowa	1926, 1969
Louisiana	1955
Maine	1933
Massachusetts	1933
Minnesota	1934
Missouri	1926
Montana	1932
Nebraska	1926
Nevada	1976
New Jersey	1927, 1953
New Mexico	1926, 1988
New York	1927, 1930
North Carolina	1934, 1937, 1940, 1961
Ohio	1923, 1927, 1962
Pennsylvania	1928, 1961
Puerto Rico	1953
South Carolina	1928, 1937
South Dakota	1927, 1975
Tennessee	1983
Texas	1939
Utah	1962, 1977
Virginia	1923, 1928, 1933, 1940, 1958
Washington	1964
Wisconsin	1926
Wyoming	1927

Routes of the original system as laid out in 1927; realignments and additions (whether realized or not) in pink

In 1927, New Jersey's state highways were renumbered. The old system, which had been defined in sequence by the legislature since 1916, was growing badly, as several routes shared the same number, and many unnumbered state highways had been defined. A partial renumbering was proposed in 1926, but instead a total renumbering was done in 1927.

Some amendments were made in 1929, including the elimination of Route 18N (by merging it into Route 1), and the addition of more spurs, as well as Route 29A, but the system stayed mostly intact until the 1953 renumbering.

== Proposed 1926 renumbering ==
A partial renumbering was proposed in 1926 to get rid of the duplicates and assigning numbers to many of the unnumbered routes. The proposed 1926 renumbering would have:

- extended Route 4 over Route 19
- renumbered Route 17N to Route 17
- renumbered Route 18N to Route 18
- renumbered Route 18S to Route 19
- designated Route 21 from Trenton to Buttzville
- renumbered Route 17S to Route 22
- renumbered Route 18 (unsuffixed) to Route 23
- designated Route 24 from Mount Holly to Freehold
- renumbered the Route 20 "from a point on Route No. 3, extending by way of West Berlin, Gibbsboro and Haddonfield, connecting with Haddon Avenue in the Borough of Haddonfield, and continuing to approach the Delaware River Bridge" to Route 25, and extended it from West Berlin to Blue Anchor (Note: This route was cancelled in the final 1927 numbering)
- designated Route 26 from Five Points to Hammonton
- designated Route 27 from Camden to Atlantic City
- designated Route 28 from South Amboy to Atlantic Highlands
- designated Route 29 from Morristown to Hackettstown
- designated Route 30 from Far Hills to Tri-State

It was eventually determined that an entire overhaul of the numbering system was necessary.

== Design ==
Chapter 319 of the 1927 public laws defined the new system of routes. Major roads received numbers from 1 to 12 and 21 to 50, as follows:

- 1-12: northern New Jersey
- 21-28: radiating from Newark
- 29-37: radiating from Trenton
- 38-47: radiating from Camden
- 48-50: southern New Jersey

Spurs were also defined, being assigned a prefix of S. For example, Route S26 was a short spur of Route 26 connecting to Route 25 south of New Brunswick. A second spur of Route 4 was assigned Route S4A, but two separate spurs of Route 24 both received the Route S24 designation.

While the majority of already-acquired routes were included in the new system, four sections of pre-1927 routes were not. The law authorizing the renumbering indicated that these were to remain, and so the State Highway Commission added a suffix of N to distinguish them from the new routes of the same number:

- Route 4N from pre-1927 Route 4, Eatontown to Belmar
- Route 5N from pre-1927 Route 5, Morris Plains to Denville
- Route 8N from pre-1927 Route 8, Sussex to Unionville, New York
- Route 18N from pre-1927 Route 18N, Fort Lee to Alpine

== List of new routes ==
New route	From	Through	To	Old designation (Note: Lines marked "L" indicate the year and chapter of the legislation marking the route.)	Modern designation (approx.) (Note: Many routes have since been rerouted off of local roads and onto freeways, especially near New York City, Trenton, and Philadelphia. The designations listed below show the modern route that serves the corridor of the original route)
Route 1	Rockleigh	Fort Lee - Alpine - Cresskill - Englewood - Fort Lee - Palisades Park - Ridgefield - North Bergen - Jersey City - Bayonne	Bayonne Bridge		CR 501
Route S1	Fort Lee	Ridgefield - Fairview	North Bergen		63
Route 2	Suffern, New York	Ridgewood - Hackensack - Hasbrouck Heights - Rutherford - Lyndhurst	North Arlington	Route 17N (proposed to be Route 17 in 1926), Suffern - North Arlington	17
Route 3	Greenwood Lake, New York	Hewitt - Midvale - Haskell - Pompton - Haledon - Prospect Park - Hawthorne - Paterson - Clifton - Wallington - East Rutherford - Secaucus	North Bergen	L. 1926 c. 140, Wallington - North Bergen	CR 511, 208, 20, 3
Route 4	George Washington Bridge	Fort Lee - Riverside - Fair Lawn - Paterson - Clifton - Bloomfield - East Orange - Irvington - Roselle - Linden - Rahway - Woodbridge - Perth Amboy - South Amboy - Rose's Corner - Cheesequake - White Brown's Corner - Matawan - Freehold - Lakewood - Toms River - Tuckerton - Absecon - Pleasantville - Somer's Point - Beesley's Point - Seaville	Cape May	Route 4, Rahway - South Amboy; L. 1925 c. 235, South Amboy - Matawan; Route 7 (Spur), Freehold - Lakewood; Route 4, Lakewood - Absecon; Route 19 (proposed to be part of Route 4 in 1926), Absecon - Seaville; Route 14, Seaville - Cape May	109, US 9, 166, 79, Garden State Parkway, 4
Route S4	Outerbridge Crossing		Perth Amboy		440 (South)
Route S4A	Tuckerton		Little Beach		N/A
Route 5	Paterson	Maywood - Hackensack - Little Ferry - Ridgefield - Fort Lee	Edgewater	Route 10, Paterson - Edgewater	I-80, 5
Route S5	Little Ferry		Ridgefield		Bergen Turnpike
Route 6	George Washington Bridge	Fort Lee - Palisades Park - Ridgefield Park - Little Ferry - Hasbrouck Heights - Paterson - Caldwell Township - Denville - Dover - Netcong - Hackettstown - Buttzville	Darlington's Bridge	Route 12, Paterson - Hackettstown; Route 5, Denville - Delaware Bridge	US 46, 159
Route 7	Paterson	Clifton - Passaic - Nutley - Belleville - Kearny	Jersey City	Route 11, Paterson - Belleville; L. 1926 c. 124, Belleville - Jersey City	7
Route 8	Delaware Bridge	Columbia - Hainesburg - Blairstown	Newton		94
Route 9	Belleville	Bloomfield - Montclair - Verona - Caldwell	Pine Brook Bridge	L. 1926 c. 124, Belleville - Pine Brook Bridge	CR 506 (actual alignment proposed as 16 but never built)
Route 10	Jersey City	Kearny - Harrison - Newark - Hanover - Whippany - Littleton	Dover	L. 1926 c. 126, Jersey City - Dover	10, I-280
Route 11	Whitehouse	Pluckemin - Martinsville	North Plainfield		I-78
Route 12	Frenchtown	Baptisttown - Croton - Flemington - Voorhees Corner - Three Bridges - Centreville	Somerville-Raritan line	L. 1926 c. 104, Flemington - Somerville	12, US 202
Route 21	Belleville		Newark	Route 11, Belleville - Newark	21
Route 22	Pine Brook Bridge	West Caldwell - Livingston - Millburn - Springfield	Rahway		59
Route 23	Verona	Cedar Grove - Pequannock - Bloomingdale - Oak Ridge - Franklin - Sussex - High Point	Port Jervis, New York	Route 8, Verona - Sussex; L. 1925 c. 158, Sussex - Port Jervis	23
Route 24	Newark	Irvington - Maplewood - Springfield - Morristown - Chester - Long Valley - Stephensburg - Washington	Phillipsburg	Route 5, Newark - Morristown; L. 1925 c. 230 (proposed to be Route 29 in 1926), Morristown - Schooleys Mountain; Route 12, Stephensburg - Phillipsburg	82, 124, Old 24, 57
Route S24	Stephensburg		Hackettstown	Route 12, Stephensburg - Hackettstown	57
Route S24	Springfield		Elizabeth		82
Route 25	Holland Tunnel	Jersey City - Kearny - Newark - Elizabeth - Rahway - Woodbridge - North Brunswick - Deans - Dayton - Cranbury - Hightstown - Robbinsville - Bordentown - Burlington - Camden	Benjamin Franklin Bridge	Route 1 (Extension), Holland Tunnel - Elizabeth; Route 1, North Brunswick - Robbinsville; Route 2, Bordentown - Ben Franklin Bridge	US 1, US 130, US 30
Route 26	Trenton	Adams	New Brunswick	L. 1926 c. 14, Trenton - New Brunswick	26, US 1
Route S26	Adams		North Brunswick		US 1
Route 27	Newark	Elizabeth - Rahway - Metuchen - New Brunswick - Princeton	Trenton	Route 1, Elizabeth - New Brunswick; Route 13, New Brunswick - Trenton	27, US 206
27-28 Link		Elizabeth			Westfield Ave
Route 28	Goethals Bridge	Elizabeth - Cranford - Westfield - Plainfield - Bound Brook - Somerville - Clinton	Phillipsburg	Route 9, Elizabeth - Phillipsburg	28, US 22, 173, 122
Route S28	Middlesex	Highland Park - New Brunswick - Weston Mills - Tanners Corner - Old Bridge - Browntown	Matawan		18
Route 29	Newark	Hillside - Union - Springfield - Mountainside - North Plainfield - Bound Brook - Ringoes - Lambertville - Washington's Crossing	Trenton	L. 1924 c. 233 (proposed to be Route 21 in 1926), Ringoes - Lambertville	US 22, US 206, US 202, 179, 29, 129
Route 30	Trenton	Pennington - Ringoes - Flemington - Clinton - Washington	Buttzville	L. 1924 c. 233 (proposed to be Route 21 in 1926), Trenton - Buttzville	31
Route 31	Princeton	Somerville - Bedminster - Chester - Netcong - Newton - Lafayette - Hamburg - Vernon	New Milford, New York	Route 16, Princeton - Bedminster; L. 1925 c. 225 (proposed to be Route 30 in 1926), Bedminster - Newton; Route 8 (Spur), Lafayette - North Church	US 206, 94
Route S31	Newton	Branchville - Montague	Milford, Pennsylvania	L. 1925 c. 225 (proposed to be Route 30 in 1926), Newton - Montague	US 206
Route 32	Bedminster	Bernardsville - Morristown - Morris Plains - Littleton - Boonton	Mountain View	Route 16, Bedminster - Morristown; Route 5, Morristown - Morris Plains	US 202
Route 33	Trenton	Robbinsville - Hightstown - Freehold	Asbury Park	Route 1, Trenton - Hightstown; Route 7, Hightstown - Asbury Park	33
Route 34	Matawan	Holmdel - Vanderburg - Colt's Neck - Shark River Station - Allenwood	Laurelton		34, 70
Route 35	South Amboy	Keyport - Eatontown - Belmar - Manasquan - Point Pleasant - Laurelton	Lakewood	Route 4, South Amboy - Eatontown; Route 4, Belmar - Lakewood	35, 88
Route 36	Keyport	Keanesburg - Belford	Atlantic Highlands	L. 1925 c. 224 (proposed to be part of Route 28 in 1926), Keyport - Atlantic Highlands	36
Route 37	Trenton	White Horse - Allentown - Lakehurst - Toms River - Seaside Heights	Point Pleasant	Route 2, Trenton - White Horse; Route 18, Lakehurst - Toms River	US 206, 37, 35
Route 38	Camden	Merchantville - Moorestown - Mount Holly	Eastampton	Route 18 (proposed to be Route 23 in 1926), Camden - Mount Holly; L. 1925 c. 222 (proposed to be Route 24 in 1926), Mount Holly - Eastampton	38, 41
Route 39	Yardley Bridge	Ewing - Bakersville - Mercerville - White Horse - Bordentown - Columbus - Vincentown - Red Lion - Indian Mills - Atsion	Da Costa	Route 2, White Horse - Bordentown; L. 1923 c. 202 (proposed to be part of Route 26 in 1926), Indian Mills - Da Costa	I-295, US-206
Route 40	Camden	Marlton - Red Lion - Four Mile - Whitesbog - Whitings - Lakehurst -	Lakewood	Route 18 (proposed to be Route 23 in 1926), Whitesbog - Lakehurst	70
Route S40	Four Mile		Manahawkin		72
Route 41	Moorestown	Haddonfield	Fairview		41, 47
Route S41	Tacony-Palmyra Bridge	Palmyra - Moorestown - Evesboro - Marlton	Berlin	L. 1923 c. 202 (proposed to be part of Route 26 in 1926), Palmyra - Evesboro	73
Route 42	Camden	Mt Ephraim - Chews Landing - Blackwood - Grenloch - Williamstown - Cecil - Weymouth	McKee City	L. 1925 c. 240 (proposed to be Route 27 in 1926), Camden - McKee City	168, 42, US 322
Route 43	Camden	Berlin - Hammonton - Egg Harbor City	Absecon	Route 3, Camden - Absecon	US 30
Route 44	Westville	Paulsboro - Bridgeport	Penns Grove	Route 17S (proposed to be Route 22 in 1926), Paulsboro - Penns Grove	44, US 130
Route 45	Camden	Woodbury - Mullica Hill - Woodstown	Salem	Route 6, Ben Franklin Bridge - Salem	Route 45
Route 46	Mullica Hill	Upper Pittsgrove	Bridgeton	Route 6, Mullica Hill - Bridgeton	77
Route 47	Brooklawn	Glassboro - Malaga - Vineland - Millville	Tuckahoe	Route 20, Brooklawn - Millville	47, 49
Route 48	Penns Grove	Woodstown - Elmer - Malaga - Mays Landing - Pleasantville	Atlantic City	Route 18S (proposed to be Route 19 in 1926), Penns Grove - Atlantic City	US 40
Route 49	Salem	Bridgeton - Millville - Port Elizabeth - Dennisville - South Dennis	Ocean View	Route 6, Salem - Bridgeton; Route 15, Bridgeton - South Dennis	49, 47, 83
Route S49	South Dennis	Goshen	Rio Grande	Route 15, South Dennis - Rio Grande	47
Route 50	Egg Harbor City	Mays Landing - Oakville - Tuckahoe	Seaville	Route 14, Egg Harbor City - Seaville	50

== Additions ==

=== 1929 amendment ===
Chapter 126 of the 1929 public law amended the 1927 act, removing redundant designations and creating entirely new roads in the New York Metropolitan Area. The amendments included

- Realigning Route 1 onto Route 18N, still left over from the first 1916 system
  - Establishing Route S1A, today Route 67, from the remnants of Route 18N not taken over by Route 1 (Lemoine and Palisades Avenues)
- Truncating Route 3 to the Hawthorne-Paterson Line
  - Establishing Route S3 (served by modern Route 3), running from Route 3 in East Rutherford to Route 6 in Clifton
- Declaring that Route S4A would be built, "provided, however, the county of Atlantic shall first agree to construct a suitable continuation of said road from Little Beach to the city of Atlantic City". Atlantic County was unable to build most of this extension, hence Route S4A was never built; the portions that were built became designated as Route 87
  - Establishing Route S4B, replacing the truncated sections of Route 3 (served today by Route 208)
- Truncating Route 5 to roughly its current length, with an extension to the centre of Ridgefield
  - Realigning Route S5 onto the southern portion of Grand Avenue (modern Route 93)
- Realigning Route 6 to a new alignment east of Caldwell Township, bypassing Paterson
  - Creating Route S6 (including modern Route 62) along the portions of Union Boulevard formerly used by Route 6
- Truncating Route 7 to Wallington

=== Other additions ===
Route	From	To	Legislated	Modern Designation	Notes
Route 2N	Lyndhurst	Nutley	1938 c. 269	Kingsland and Park Ave	
Route S3 Spur	Route S3	Clifton	1942 c. 77 Named 1948 c. 221	161	
Route 4A	Old Bridge	West Freehold	1942	34, 79	Replaced realigned section of Route 4
Route S4C	Bennet	Cape May		162, Beach Ave, Broadway, Seashore Road	Renumbered to Route 85 in the 1953 renumbering; never built
Route S4D	Teaneck	Tappan, NY	1938 c. 134		Cancelled before the renumbering
Route 6A	Dover	Frankford	1938 c. 47	15	
Route 6M	Montville	Fairfield	1941	159	Replaced realigned section of Route 6
Route 10N	Paterson	Ridgefield	1929	Hackensack Plank Road	Replaced realigned section of Route 5; eliminated by 1930s
Route 11N	Passaic	Paterson	1929	Main Ave	Replaced truncated section of Route 7
Route 13E	Point Pleasant	Bay Head	1938 c. 238	13	
Route 17	Suffern, New York	North Arlington	1942	17	Route 2 renumbered to Route 17 to create one single route from the Great Lakes to the New York City area for WWII caravans
Route 18	Old Bridge	Eatontown	1939 c. 243	18	New freeway designated.
Route 19	Paterson	Belleville	1939 c. 200	Marshall Street, Hazel Street, Paulison Avenue, River Drive (old routing of 21)	Became part of Route 21 in 1948.
Route 24-28 Link	Philipsburg		1940	Morris St	When Route 24 was rerouted onto a freeway north of Morris St, the remnants were still state-maintained to link Routes 24 and 28
Route 25A	Newark	Harrison	1939 c. 198	I-280	Renumbered to Route 58 in 1953; in 1997, the designation was dropped in favour of I-280
Route 25AD	Newark	Harrison		158	Locally called the Center Street Bridge; designation removed 1960, bridge demolished in 1979
Route 25B	Newark		1939 c. 317	Port Street, Doremus Ave	Renumbered to Route 65 in 1953; removed from state highway system in 1963
Route 25M	North Brunswick	New Brunswick	1940	171	A former alignment of US-130
Route S25	Bristol, PA	Burlington	1929 c. 57	413	
Route 25T	East Ferry	Jersey City		US 1/9 Truck	Truck route of Route 25, due to ban of trucks on Pulaski Skyway of the time
Route 26A	Adams	New Brunswick	1941	91	
Route 28A					The only evidence of this route is the fact that it was later absorbed into US-22; possibly 24-28 link
Route 28-29 Link	North Branch	Bridgewater	1938 c. 17	US-22	US-22 Bypass of Route 28
Route 29A	New Hope	Frenchtown	1929 c. 241	29	
Route 29B	Frenchtown	Philipsburg	1938 c. 183	CR 519	
Route S29	Lambertville	New Hope, PA	1949	179	
Route 31A	Princeton	Hightstown	1941 c. 105	Princeton-Hightstown Street, 64	
Route 33-35 Link	Tinton Falls	Neptune Township		66	
Route S41A	Berlin	Folsom	1938 c. 299	73	
Route S41N	Wrightsville	Palmyra	1941	155	
Route S43	Germania	Northfield	1938 c. 216	CR 563	Renumbered to Route 89 in the 1953 renumbering; never built as a state highway
Route S44	Bridgeport	Bridgeport Ferry	1938 c. 374	324	
Route S44A	Ellisburg	Brooklawn	1938 c. 374	CR 551 Spur	Also known locally as Kings Highway; renumbered to Route 80 in the 1953 renumbering; never built as a state highway
Route 44T	Paulsboro	Deptford	1938 c. 367		Designed to form a connection from a Paulsboro-Essington Bridge; renumbered to Route 78 in the 1953 renumbering; never built
Route 51	Bridgeport	Williamstown	1939	US-322	
Route 52	Somers Point	Mays Landing	1937	Somers Point Road	
Route 54	Hammonton	Vineland	1938 c. 43	54, Lincoln Avenue	
Route 55	Pleasantville	Atlantic City	1938 c. 83	US 40	Replaced truncated section of Route 48
Route 55N	New York	Teaneck	1938		Renumbered to Route 303 in the 1953 renumbering to connect to NY equivalent; cancelled shortly after
Route 56	Absecom	Atlantic City	1938 c. 177	US 30, Absecon Blvd	
Route 56N	Laurelton	Mantoloking	1938 c. 84		Renumbered to Route 74 in the 1953 renumbering; never built
Route S56	Atlantic City		1941	87, 187	
Route 84	Sussex	Unionville, NY	1942	284	Renumbering of 8N; renumbered 284 to avoid confusion with nearby I-84
Route 100	New Brunswick	Fort Lee	1938 c. 50	New Jersey Turnpike	Originally planned to extend to Route 26
Route S100	Elizabeth (Route 100)	Elizabeth (Route 25)	1938 c. 50	81	
Route 101	Kearny	Hackensack	1939 c. 105	21, 17	Never built
Route S101	Hackensack	Montvale	1951 c. 289	444	
Route 151	Camden		1946 c. 115	S10, S11 Aves, Memorial Ave, Flanders Blvd	Administration given back to Camden after 1969
Route 300	Delaware Memorial Bridge	New Brunswick	1947 c. 259	New Jersey Turnpike	
Route 700	Delaware Memorial Bridge	US 46 in Ridgefield	1952	New Jersey Turnpike	

== See also ==
- List of state highways in New Jersey before 1927
- 1953 New Jersey state highway renumbering
