= List of state highways in New Jersey before 1927 =

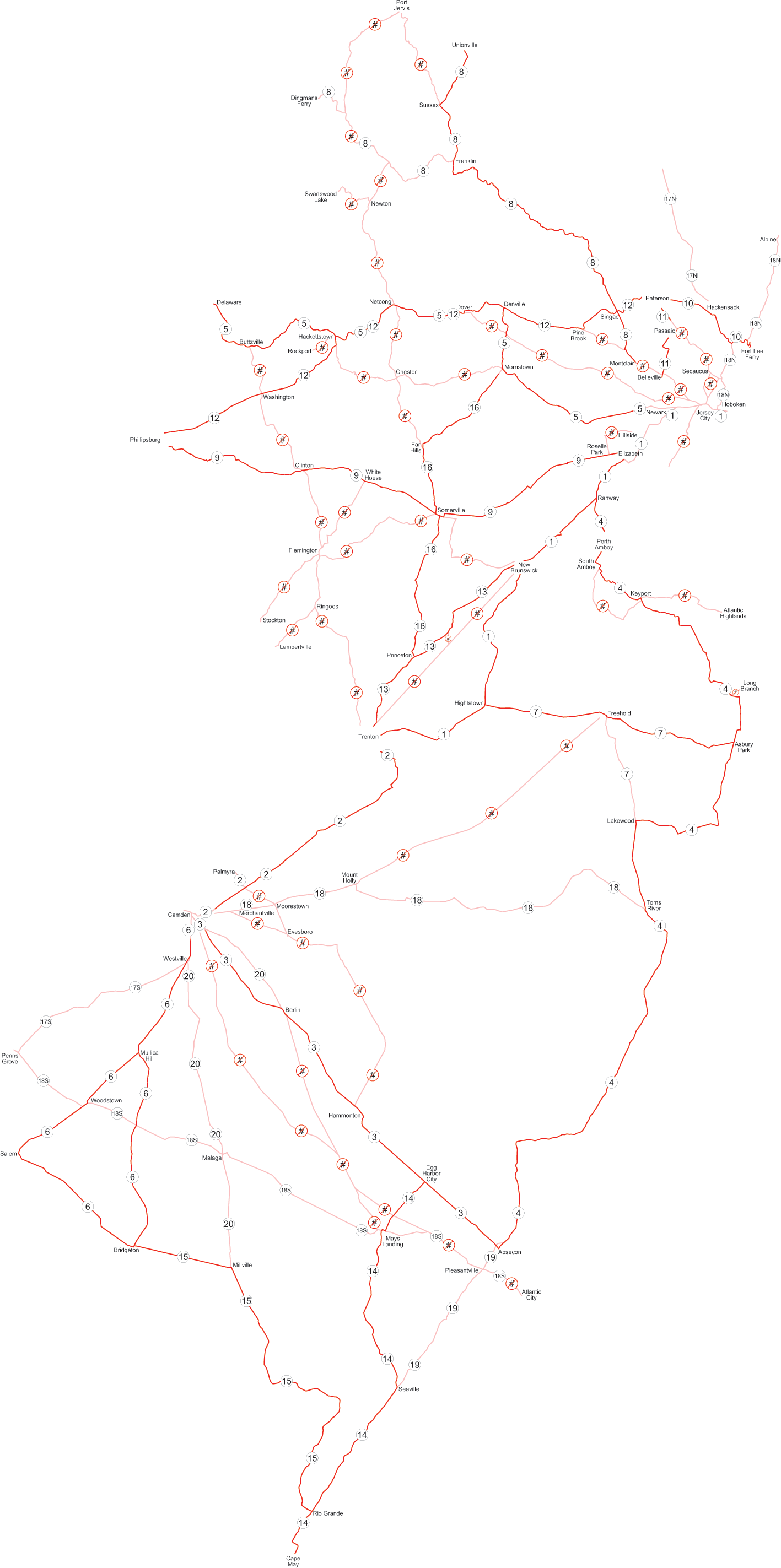
Map of pre-1927 state highways. Routes 1 to 16 are in dark red, while Routes 17 to 20, unnumbered highways, and extensions defined in 1922 or later are lighter.

New Jersey was one of the first U.S. states to adopt a system of numbered state highways. New Jersey's original numbered highway system was first legislated in 1916, succeeding another proposal submitted in 1913 by the State Highway commission. By 1923, 24 routes had been numbered. Due to a lack of central organizing oversight, many routes were legislated, but not numbered. A partial renumbering was proposed in 1926 to eliminate duplicates and give numbers to all routes, and in 1927 a full renumbering was carried out.

== History ==
=== 19th century ===
The earliest efforts for the state of New Jersey to maintain a network of highways dates back to 1891, when law was passed allotting funds for the construction of highways.

=== 20th century ===
This was bolstered in 1894 with the creation of a Commissioner of Public Roads, which evolved into the State Highway Commission in 1909. The first highways the commission created were the Ocean Highway and the Delaware River Drive, created in 1909 and 1911 respectively. The first effort at a state-wide highway network was begun by the commission in 1912 and submitted for approval in 1913. This system was never put in place; instead, the first permanent system to define a system of highways in the state was created by the Egan Bill (1916 state laws, chapter 285), which designated the initial system of 13 routes, bolstered by the Edge Bill (L. 1917 c. 14), which went into more detail on funding, maintenance, and similar issues. At this time most primary roads in the state had trail numbers which bore no resemblance to the highway numbers; these were soon obsoleted by the new system.

However, after 1921, the process was less coordinated, as local politicians tried to get their route built without concern for duplication of numbers. The State Highway Commission was not allowed to change the numbers; the best they could do was assign suffixes. Where multiple routes existed with the same number, suffixes of N and S were used for the northernmost and southernmost. Starting in 1923, various unnumbered routes were also assigned; none of these were taken over by 1927.

Construction and maintenance transfers began by 1917 with Route 13 (the Lincoln Highway, now Route 27) north of Kingston; the routes were marked by 1922.

In 1926, a partial renumbering was proposed to eliminate duplicates and assign a number to every route; this would have given the system numbers from 1 to 30. Instead, a total renumbering was adopted in 1927 as public law chapter 319. This system, known as the 1927 renumbering, assigned numbers from 1 to 12 in North Jersey, 21 to 28 roughly radiating from Newark, 29 to 37 from Trenton, 38 to 47 from Camden, and 48 to 50 in South Jersey. Portions of the pre-1927 routes that had been taken over or built, but were not assigned new numbers, kept their old numbers. These four routes - Route 4N, Route 5N, Route 8N, and Route 18N were all assigned the suffix N since the only suffixed one to remain was 18N, and the others needed to be distinguished from the new routes of the same number.

== List of routes ==
| Route | From | Through | | To | Existing roads used | Legislation | Extensions | Status (1927) | Modern designation |
|---|---|---|---|---|---|---|---|---|---|
| Route 1 | Elizabeth Line | Rahway - New Brunswick Line; New Brunswick Line - Hightstown | | Trenton Line | Rahway Ave, Essex and Middlesex Turnpike, New Brunswick and Cranbury Turnpike, Greenwood Ave | Egan Bill (1916, c. 285) | Elizabeth - Newark - Jersey City (1922) | 25, 27, 25, 33 | I-78, 139, US-1/9, 27, US-130, 33 |
| Route 2 | Trenton Line | Burlington | | Camden Line | Broad Street, White Horse Road, Farnsworth Ave, Burlington-Bordentown Road, Westfield and Camden Turnpike | Egan Bill (1916, c. 285) | Camden - Philadelphia (1922) | 37, 39, 25 | US-206, US-130, US-30 |
| Route 2 Spur | Five Points | | | Palmyra | Westfield and Camden Turnpike Spur | 1922, c. 265 | | S41 | Former 155 |
| Route 3 | Camden Line | Berlin - Hammonton - Egg Harbor City | | Absecon | White Horse Pike | Egan Bill (1916, c. 285) | Thru Camden (?) | 43 | US-30 |
| Route 4 | Rahway | Perth Amboy - Asbury Park - Point Pleasant - Lakewood - Toms River | | Absecon | St. George's Road, Perth Amboy Ave, Stephens Ave (Main St), Keyport Road, Middletown-Red Bank Road, Red Bank-Eatontown Road, Eatontown-Long Branch Road, Monmouth Road, Cedar Ave, Norwood Ave, Main St, Belmar and Manasquan River Road, Lakewood-Tom's River Road, Main Shore Road, Chestnut Neck Road | Egan Bill (1916, c. 285) | | 4, 35, 4N, 35, 4 | 35, 71, 35, 88, US-9 |
| Route 5 | Newark Line | Morristown - Denville - Dover - Hackettstown | | Darlington's Bridge | Springfield Ave, Morris Ave, Madison Ave, Speedwell St, Parsippany and Rockaway Turnpike, Blackwell St, Dover Turnpike, Morris-Sussex Turnpike, Denville Road, Buttzville Road, Buttzville-Belvidere Road, Delaware Road | Egan Bill (1916, c. 285) | Through Newark (1926) | 24, 32, 5N, 6 | CR-603, 124, US-202, 53, US-46 |
| Route 6 | Camden Line | Westville - Mullica Hill - | Pittsgrove | Bridgeton | Broadway, Gloucester and Woodbury Turnpike, Woodbury and Mullica Hill Turnpike, | Egan Bill (1916, c. 285) | Camden - Philadelphia (1922), Salem - Bridgeton (1922-1925) | 45, 46, 49 | Broadway, 45, 77, 49 |
| Route 6 | Camden Line | Westville - Mullica Hill - | Woodstown | Salem | Broadway, Gloucester and Woodbury Turnpike, Woodbury and Mullica Hill Turnpike, | Egan Bill (1916, c. 285) | Camden - Philadelphia (1922), Salem - Bridgeton (1922-1925) | 45, 46, 49 | Broadway, 45, 77, 49 |
| Route 7 | Hightstown | Freehold | | Asbury Park | Manapalan Road, Manapalan-Freehold Road, Freehold-Jerseyville Road, Jerseyville-Hamilton Road, Corlies Ave, Main St | Egan Bill (1916, c. 285) | | 33, 4N | 33, 71 |
| Route 7 Spur | Freehold | Adelphia | | Lakewood | Old Stage Road | 1925, c. 24-25 | | 4 | US-9 |
| Route 8 | Montclair | Sussex | | Unionville, New York | Newark and Pompton Turnpike, Paterson and Hamburg Turnpike, Stockholm-Franklin Furnace Road, Unionville Road | Egan Bill (1916, c. 285) | | 23, 8N | 23, 284 |
| Route 8 Spur | Franklin Furnace | Monroe - Lafayette - Branchville | | Dingman's Ferry | Franklin Road, Church Road, Union Turnpike, Tuttles Corner-Dingman's Ferry Road | 1926, c. 256 | | 31, S31 | CR-631, 94, 15, US-206, CR-560 |
| Route 9 | Elizabeth Line | Somerville | | Phillipsburg Line | Westfield Ave, South Ave, Front Street, Lincoln Road, Union Ave, Gaston Ave, Jersey Turnpike | Egan Bill (1916, c. 285) | | 28 | 28, US-22, 173, I-78 |
| Route 10 | Paterson | Hackensack | | Fort Lee Ferry | Hackensack and Paterson Turnpike, Bergen Turnpike | Egan Bill (1916, c. 285) | | 5 | Market St, Essex St, Hudson St, Bergen Turnpike, Edgewater St, 5 |
| Route 11 | Paterson Line | Belleville - Nutley - Passaic | | Newark | Main St, Passaic Ave, Kingsland Road, Washington Ave | Egan Bill (1916, c. 285) | | 7 | 7 |
| Route 12 | Paterson | Denville - Dover - Hackettstown | | Phillipsburg | Union Ave, Main St, Little Falls Road, Fairfield Road, Clinton Road, Oak Road, Rockaway and Parsippany Turnpike, Blackwell St, Dover Turnpike, Morris-Sussex Turnpike, Denville Road, Washington Turnpike (and spur) | Egan Bill (1916, c. 285) | | 6, S24, 24 | 62, CR-631, CR-615, 159, US-46, 182, 57 |
| Route 13 | New Brunswick Line | Princeton | | Trenton Line | Lincoln Highway (Somerset Street, Lawrenceville-Trenton Road) | Egan Bill (1916, c. 285) | | 27 | 27, US-206 |
| Route 14 | Egg Harbor City | Mays Landing - Seaville - Rio Grande | | Cape May | May's Landing Road | Edge Bill (1917 c. 14) | | 50, 4 | 50, US-9, 109 |
| Route 15 | Bridgeton | Millville | | Rio Grande | Bridgeton and Millville Turnpike, Delsea Drive | Edge Bill (1917 c. 14) | | 49, S49 | 49, 47 |
| Route 16 | Morristown Line | Somerville | | Princeton | | | Thru Morristown (1925) | 32, 31 | US-202, US-206 |
| Route 17N | Hackensack | Maywood - Ridgewood - Ramsey | | Suffern, New York | Franklin Turnpike, Paramus Road, Passaic St | 1923 c. 5, 177, 181, 183, 184 | Reduced from Newark (before 1925) | 2 | 17 |
| Route 17S | Westville | Thorofare - Paulsboro - Gibbstown - Bridgeport | | Penns Grove | | 1923 c. 199 | | 44 | 44, US-130, 49 |
| Route 18 | Camden | Mount Holly | | Toms River | | 1923 c. 184 | | 38, 40, 37 | CR 537, CR 612, 38, CR 530, 70, 37, CR 527 |
| Route 18N | Hoboken | Fort Lee | | Alpine | Bergen Turnpike | 1923 c. 197 | | 18N | US-9, US-9W |
| Route 18S | Penns Grove | Woodstown - Pittsgrove - Malaga - Mays Landing - Pleasantville | | Atlantic City | Harding Highway, Black Horse Turnpike | 1923 c. 181, 183 | | 48 | 48, US 40 |
| Route 19 | Seaville | Pleasantville | | Absecon | | 1923 c. 182, 183 | | 4 | US-9 |
| Route 20 | Berlin | Haddonfield | | Camden | Haddon Ave (Haddonfield-Berlin Road) | 1923 c. 177 | | | |
| Route 20 | Westville | Malaga | | Millville | | 1923 c. 182 | | 47 | 47 |
| | Berlin | Blue Anchor | | Mays Landing | Berlin-Blue Anchor Road, Mays Landing Road | 1923, c. 201 | | | CR-561, 73 |
| | Five Points | Moorestown - Evesboro - Medford - Atsion | | Hammonton | Church St, Medford-Evesboro Road, Stokes Road, Trenton Road | 1923, c. 202 | | | CR-541, US-206 |
| (Spur) | Evesboro | | | Merchantville | Church Road | 1923, c. 202 | | | |
| | Trenton | Pennington - Woodsville - Ringoes - Flemington - Clinton - Glen Gardner - Hampton - Washington | | Buttzville | Pennington Road, Pennington-Hopewell Road, Marshall's Corner-Woodsville Road, Rocktown Hill Road, Spruce Run Turnpike, Buttzville Road | 1924, c. 233 | | 30 | 31 |
| (Spur) | Lambertville | | | Ringoes | Old York Road | 1924, c. 233 | | 29 | 179 |
| (Spur) | Flemington | | | White House Station | Flemington-Whitehouse Road | 1924, c. 233 | | | CR-523 |
| | Sussex | High Point | | Port Jervis | | 1925, c. 158 | | 23 | 23 |
| | Freehold | | | Mount Holly | Old Monmouth Road | 1925, c. 222 | | 38 | CR-537 |
| | Atlantic Highlands | | | Keyport | Ocean Boulevard | 1925, c. 224 | | 36 | 36 |
| | Far Hills | Chester - Flanders - Netcong - Andover - Newton - Rosses Corner - Branchville - Hainesville | | Tri-State | Morris Turnpike, Deckertown and Newton Turnpike, Union Turnpike | 1925, c. 225 | | 31, S-31 | US-206 |
| | Morristown | Mendham - Chester - Long Valley | | Hackettstown | Washington Turnpike | 1925, c. 230 | | 24 | CR-510, CR-513 |
| | South Amboy | Cheesequake - Matawan | | Keyport | Main St, Cheesequake Road, Mount Pleasant Road, Old Bridge-Matawan Road, Main St, Maple Place | 1925, c. 235 | | 4 | US-9, 34, CR-689, CR-516 |
| | Camden | Mt. Ephraim - Chews - Blackwood - Turnersville - Cross Keys - Williamstown - Cecil - Weymouth - McKee City - Pleasantville | | Atlantic City | Black Horse Turnpike | 1925, c. 240 | | 42, 48 | 168, 42, US-322, US-40 |
| | Trenton | | | New Brunswick | Trenton and New Brunswick Straight Line Turnpike | 1926, c. 14 | | 26 | US-1, 26 |
| | Roselle Park | Union Township | | Hillside Township | Chestnut St, Salem Road, Liberty Ave | 1926, c. 46 | | | |
| | Stockton | Flemington - Somerville - Finderne - Millstone | | New Brunswick | Seargantsville Road, Voorhees Corner Road, Old York Road, Main St, Finderne Ave, Main St, Millstone River Road, Amwell Road | 1926, c. 104 | | 12, 28 | CR-523, CR-650, CR-613, CR-567, CR-626, 28, CR-533, CR-514 |
| | Jersey City | North Bergen - East Rutherford | | Passaic | Paterson and New York Plank Road | 1926, c. 108 | | 3, 1 | 120, CR-681 |
| | Kearny | Bellville - Montclair - Verona | | Caldwell | Belleville Turnpike, Belleville Ave, Bloomfield Ave | 1926, c. 124 | | 7, 9 | 7, CR-506 |
| | Jersey City | Newark - Livingston - Hanover | | Dover | Newark-Jersey City Turnpike, Newark-Mount Pleasant Turnpike, | 1926, c. 126 | | 25, 10 | CR-577, 10 |
| | Jersey City | North Bergen - East Rutherford | | Passaic | Paterson and New York Plank Road, Tonelle Ave | 1926, c. 140 | | 3 | 120, CR-681, US-9 |
| | Newton | | | Swartswood Lake | Swartswood Road | 1926, c. 167 | | | CR-622 |
| | Kingston | | | Trenton-New Brunswick Pike | | 1926, c. 185 | | Never built | |
| | Jersey City | Bayonne | | Bayonne Bridge | Hudson Boulevard | 1926, c. 194 | | 1 | CR-501, 440 |
| | West Long Branch | | | Long Branch | Wall St | 1926, c. 259 | | | |
| | Hackettstown | | | Rockport | Rockport Road | 1926, c. 323 | | | |

== See also ==
- State highways in New Jersey
- 1927 New Jersey state highway renumbering
- 1953 New Jersey state highway renumbering
