= New Jersey Route 4 =

Highway in New Jersey

Route 4
- Mackay Highway
- Route 4 highlighted in red

Route information
- Maintained by NJDOT
- Length: 10.83 mi (17.43 km)
- Existed: 1927 (1934 on present alignment)–present

Major junctions
- West end: Route 20 / Broadway in Paterson
- Route 208 / CR 79 in Fair Lawn; G.S. Parkway in Paramus; Route 17 in Paramus; CR 503 in Hackensack; Route 93 / CR 501 in Englewood
- East end: I-95 / US 1-9 / US 46 / US 9W in Fort Lee

Location
- Country: United States
- State: New Jersey
- Counties: Passaic, Bergen

Highway system
- New Jersey State Highway Routes; Interstate; US; State; Scenic Byways
← Route 3	→ Route 5

Route 4 is a state highway in Bergen County and Passaic County, United States. The highway stretches 10.83 mi (17.43 km) from Route 20 (McLean Boulevard) in Paterson east to an interchange with Interstate 95 (I-95), U.S. Route 1/9 (US 1/9), US 46, and US 9W at the George Washington Bridge approach in Fort Lee.

The route is a four- to six-lane divided highway its entire length, with the portion east of the Route 208 interchange in Fair Lawn an arterial road consisting of interchanges and right-in/right-out intersections with many businesses along the road, particularly in Paramus, where the route passes through a major shopping area consisting of numerous malls, Hackensack, Englewood, and Fort Lee. Route 4 intersects many important roads, including Route 208 in Fair Lawn and the Garden State Parkway and Route 17 in Paramus. It also serves as a northern alternative to Interstate 80 between Paterson and the George Washington Bridge. The highway is officially named the Mackay Highway, but is rarely referred to as such.

Originally legislated to traverse the state from Cape May to the George Washington Bridge, Route 4 was heavily reduced to its current alignment in 1953. Today's stretch of the route was completed by 1934; the state planned to upgrade it to a freeway, but plans never materialized. Despite this, the route has seen improvements, such as to the interchanges with Route 17 in 1999 and with Route 208 in 2002.

Route 4 is a heavily used commuter, retail, and long-distance artery. As well as providing a critical commuter route from the Hudson Valley and Bergen County into New York City via the George Washington Bridge, it gives New Yorkers access to popular shopping areas such as Garden State Plaza and Bergen Town Center, and forms part of the straightest route from New York City and Long Island to Upstate and Western New York destinations. Locally, especially west of the Hackensack River, it is seen as a socioeconomic dividing line between wealthier, more affluent suburbs like Ridgewood and Oradell to the north, and more urbanized, industrialized, working-class areas like Hackensack to the south.

== Route description ==
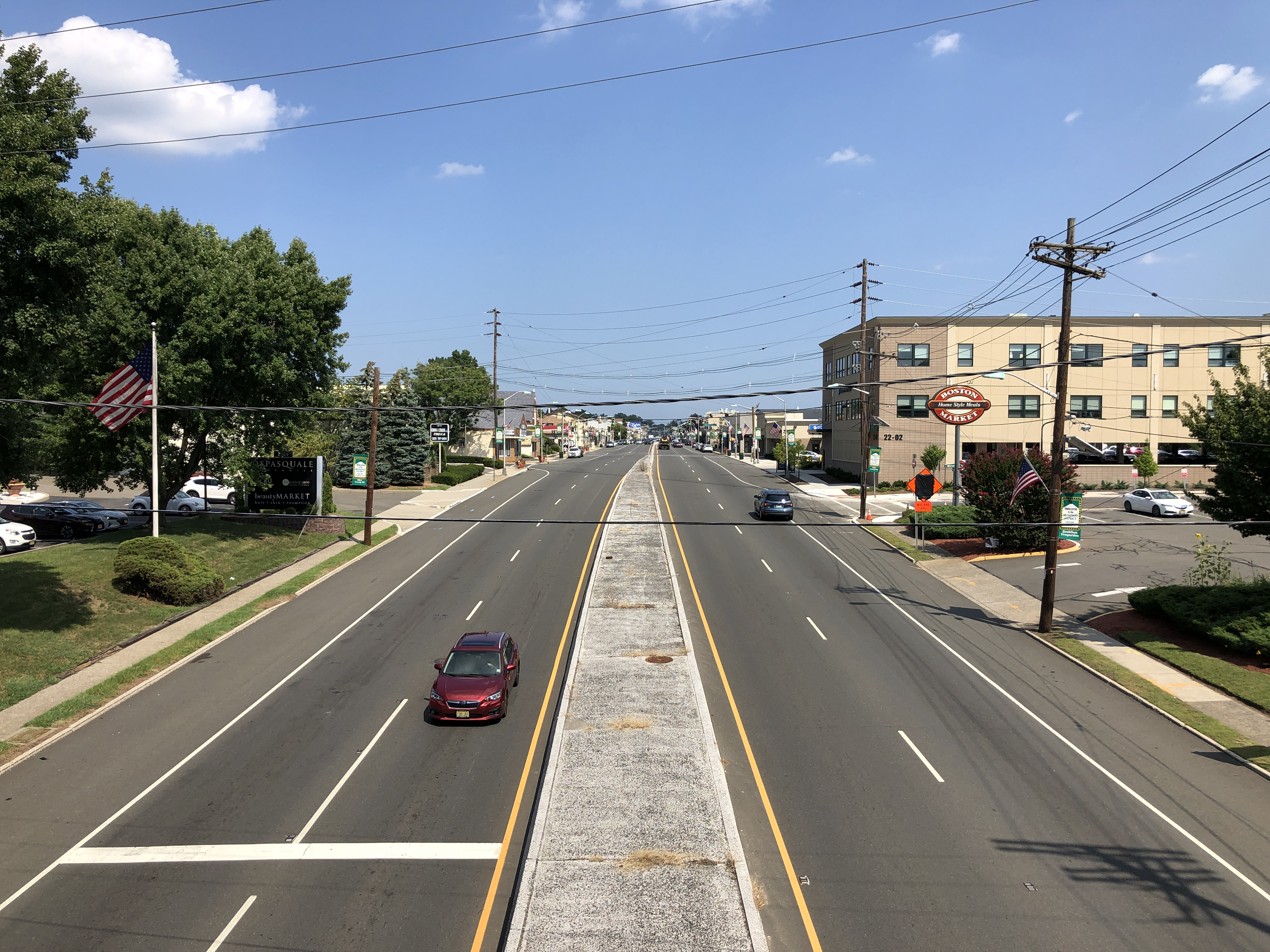
Route 4 eastbound in Fair Lawn

Route 4 starts in Paterson, Passaic County, at the intersection of Broadway and East 43rd Street at an interchange with Route 20 (McLean Boulevard), heading east on Broadway, a four-lane arterial road with a Jersey barrier. The route passes over Route 20 and continues east, crossing the Passaic River into Elmwood Park, Bergen County and passing over County Route 507 (CR 507). Route 4 features a right-in/right-out in the eastbound direction that provides access to CR 507. The route continues east on Broadway as a boulevard with a concrete then a grassy median, with businesses lining both sides of the roadway. At the intersection with Cyril Avenue, Route 4 runs along the border of Elmwood Park to the south and Fair Lawn to the north before entirely entering Fair Lawn, where the route passes under NJ Transit’s Bergen County Line near Broadway station. It intersects CR 67 (Midland Avenue) and continues east as an arterial road with a Jersey barrier through commercial areas of Fair Lawn.

Route 4 comes to an interchange Route 208, where the route continues east on the Route 208 alignment, as a divided highway with four lanes in the eastbound direction and three lanes in the westbound direction. The interchange between Route 4 and Route 208 also features access to CR 79 (Saddle River Road). The route continues east as a six-lane arterial that is lined with businesses. Route 4 crosses the Saddle River and then enters Paramus. Upon entering Paramus, Route 4 has a cloverleaf interchange with CR 62 (Paramus Road/Passaic Street). The route features a partial interchange with the Garden State Parkway, with access from westbound Route 4 to the southbound Garden State Parkway and from the northbound Garden State Parkway to eastbound Route 4. Route 4 has an interchange which provides access to the Westfield Garden State Plaza shopping mall, located on the south side of the road, and a large IKEA store, located on the north side of the road. Past this, Route 4 features a cloverleaf interchange with Route 17 and continues east as a six-lane arterial. It interchanges with Spring Valley Road and passes by Bergen Town Center located on the south side of the road. Route 4 interchanges with CR 59 (Forest Avenue/Maywood Avenue).

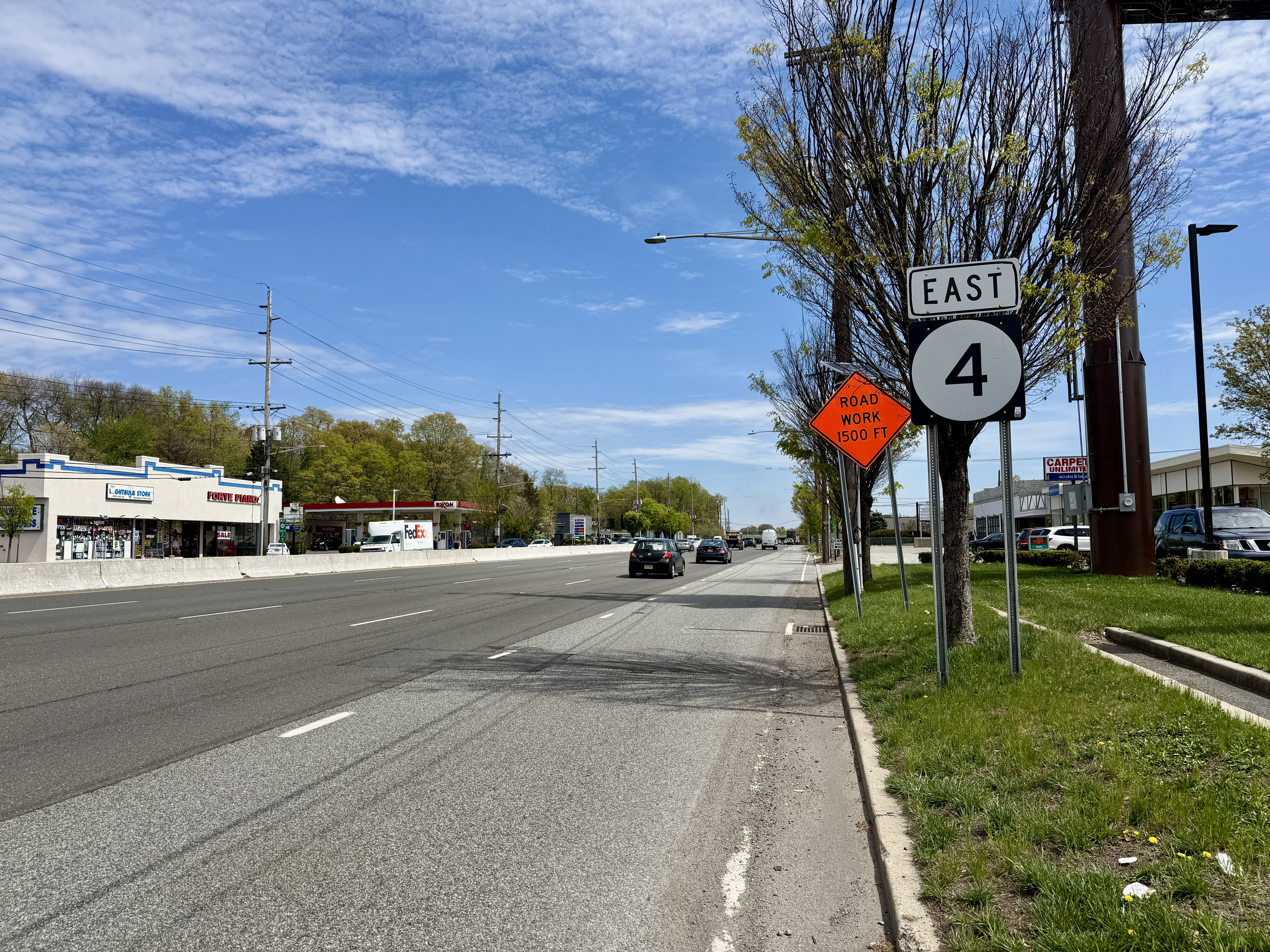
Route 4 eastbound in Paramus

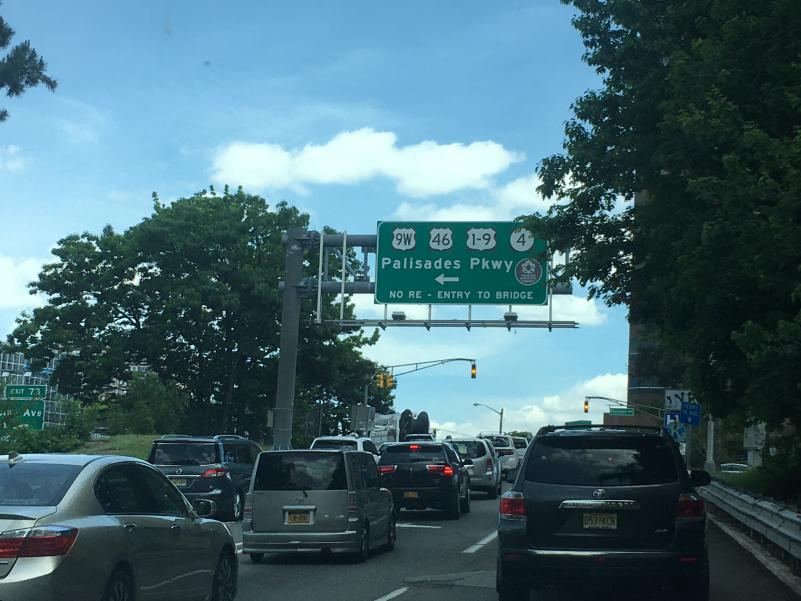
The east end of Route 4 at US 9W in Fort Lee

As the road leaves Paramus, businesses no longer line the route. Route 4 enters River Edge, where the route crosses Van Saun Mill Creek, and it heads to the southeast and features ramps that provide access to CR 51 (Kinderkamack Road), which the route passes over along with NJ Transit's Pascack Valley Line just south of the New Bridge Landing station. Upon crossing the Pascack Valley Line, Route 4 heads into Hackensack, where it interchanges with CR 503 (Hackensack Avenue) near The Shops at Riverside. The route crosses the Hackensack River into Teaneck and heads through the campus of Fairleigh Dickinson University. Route 4 features ramps that provide access to CR 41 (River Road), which it later passes over. The road continues southeast through wooded residential areas, intersecting a few roads at right-in/right-out intersections, before passing over CSX's River Subdivision line and reaching an interchange with Queen Anne Road. It interchanges with CR 39 (Teaneck Road) and Webster Avenue/Farragut Drive before crossing into Englewood where the route crosses Overpeck Creek. In Englewood, Route 4 passes over CSX's Northern Branch rail line. Nearby is a cloverleaf interchange with Route 93 and CR 501 (Grand Avenue). Past this interchange, businesses stop along the road and it continues east with three lanes in the eastbound direction and two lanes in the westbound direction, coming to an interchange with Jones Road. Past this interchange, the road continues south with businesses along the road, crossing into Fort Lee. In Fort Lee, the lanes split as Route 4 approaches I-95, with the eastbound lanes passing over I-95. Route 4 continues south with I-95 in the median, ending at an interchange with I-95, US 1/9, US 46, and US 9W, at the George Washington Bridge approach.

== History ==
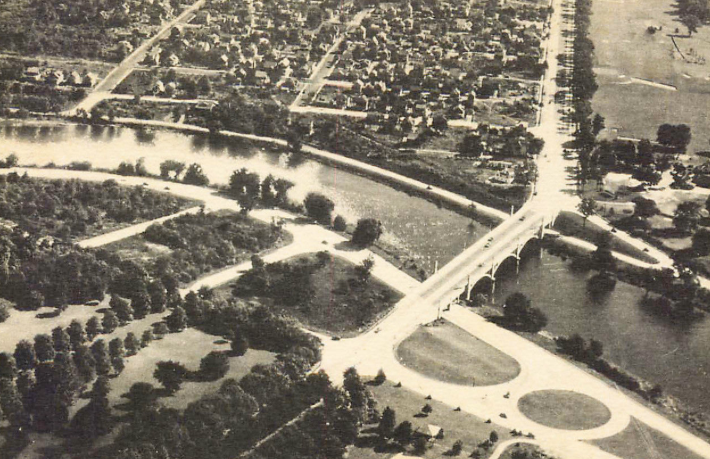
Broadway Bridge over Passaic River

Route 4 was originally legislated in the 1927 New Jersey state highway renumbering to run from Cape May north to the George Washington Bridge, running through Pleasantville, Toms River, Freehold, Perth Amboy, Rahway, and Paterson. The route replaced portions of the alignments of several pre-1927 state highways including Route 14 (chartered 1917) between Cape May and Seaville, Route 19 between Seaville and Absecon (c. 1923, never realized), Route 4 (c. 1916) between Absecon and Lakewood and between South Amboy and Rahway, a spur of Route 7 (c. 1925) between Lakewood and Freehold. US 9 was also designated along Route 4 between Absecon and Lakewood and from South Amboy to Rahway. By the 1940s, US 9 was realigned to follow Route 4 between Lakewood and South Amboy, having followed portions of today’s Route 88, Route 35, and Route 71 and was extended south along Route 4 to Cape May. The section of present-day Route 4 was built beginning 1930 to connect Paterson and the George Washington Bridge in Fort Lee, and was completed and opened July 28, 1932. There were plans made in 1936 to make this portion of Route 4 a limited-access highway; however, World War II delayed plans for the expressway.

By Joint Resolution No. 11, approved June 8, 1935, the New Jersey Legislature designated Route 4 as the Mackay Highway. William B. Mackay, Jr., a Republican from Bergen County, had served in the New Jersey State Senate from 1917 to 1928. Afterwards he served as judge of the Passaic circuit of the New Jersey Supreme Court.

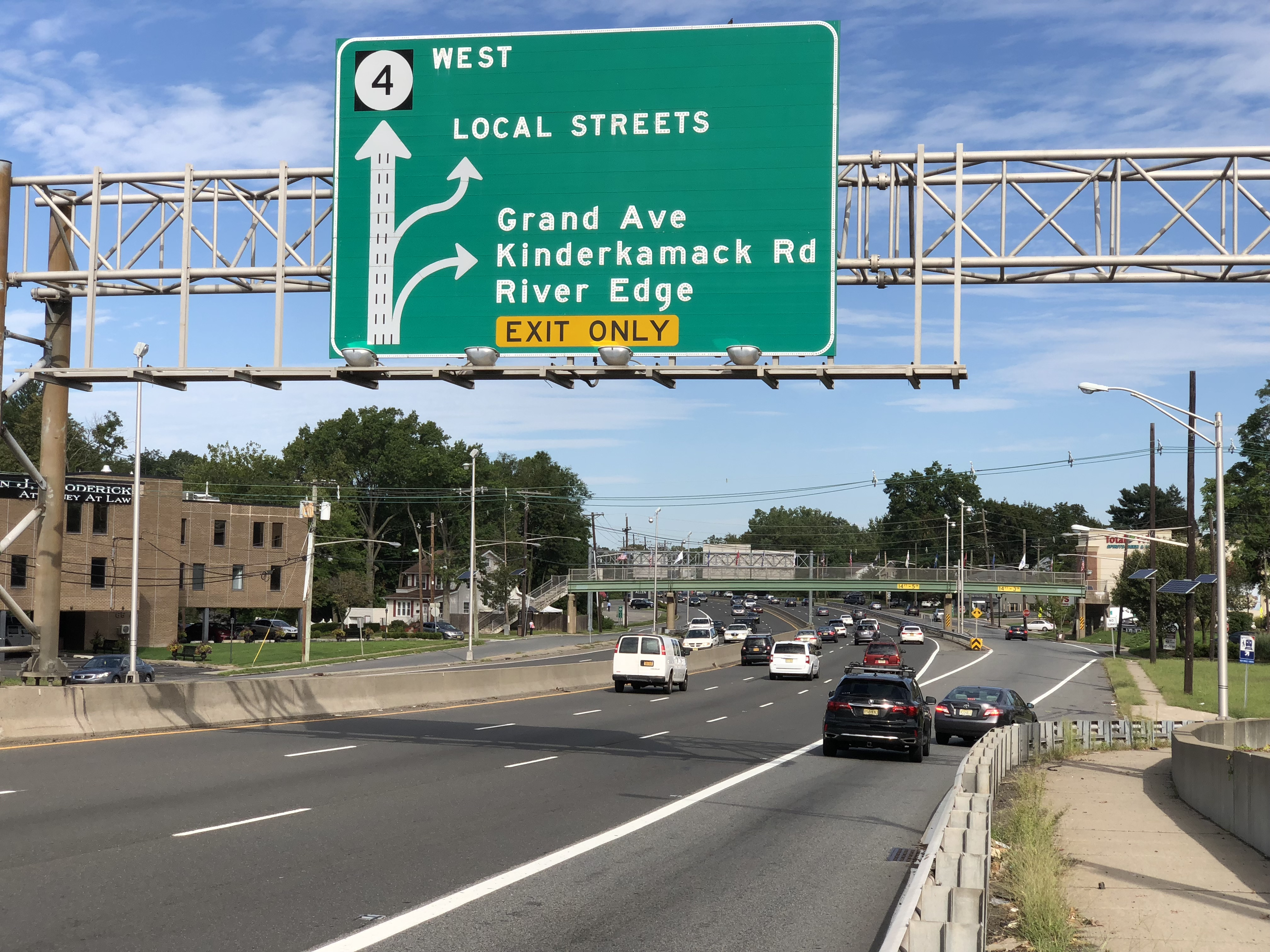
View west along Route 4 just west of Kinderkamack Road in River Edge

Route 4 had several former spur routes that existed prior to the 1953 New Jersey state highway renumbering. Route 4N was designated in 1939 from the portion of pre-1927 Route 4 between Brielle and Eatontown; it is now Route 71. Route S4 was defined in 1927 to run to the Outerbridge Crossing in Perth Amboy from present-day Route 35; it was eventually extended to the Garden State Parkway and this route is now Routes 440 and 184. Route S4A was planned in 1927 to run from Atlantic City across swamps to Tuckerton; only a small portion of this route was built and it is now Route 87. Route S4B was planned in 1929 to run from Route 4 near Paterson northwest to the New York border, replacing a portion of what was legislated as Route 3 in 1927. The portion of this route that was built between Fair Lawn and Oakland is now Route 208. Route S4D was a never built spur in Teaneck proposed in 1938; the proposal was renumbered Route 303. Route 4A was created by the 1940s following a realignment of Route 4 (and US 9) between Freehold and Cheesequake; it became Route 79 and a portion of Route 34 in 1953. Route 4 Parkway was planned in 1946 as a north–south parkway running from Cape May north to Route 6 (now US 46) in Clifton, bridging the gap that existed along Route 4 between Rahway and Paterson; this proposal became Route 444 (Garden State Parkway). Route S4C was a planned route running from Route 4 in Bennett south to Cape May; the general alignment of this route is now Route 162 and Cape May County Route 626.

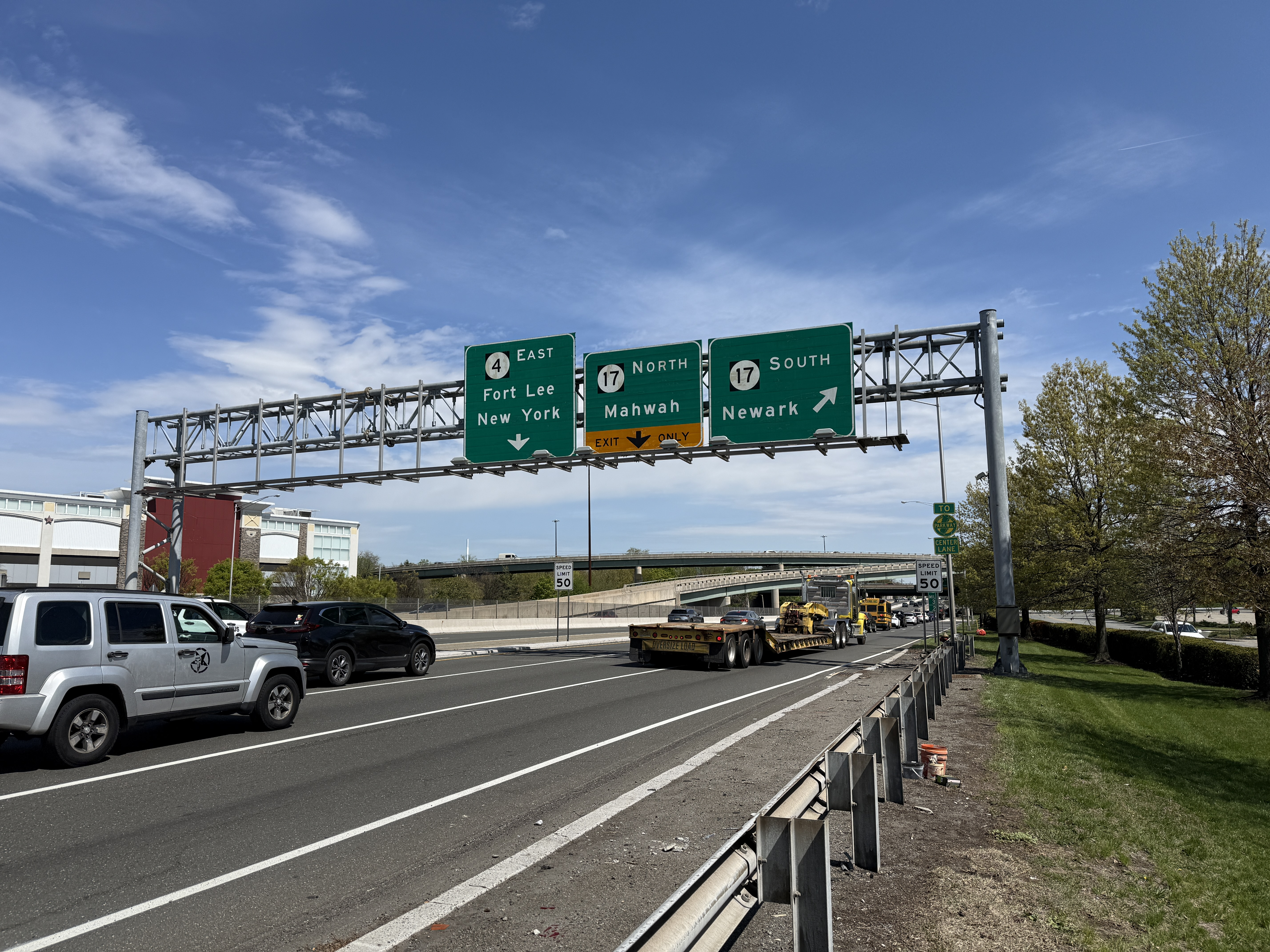
Route 4 eastbound at the Route 17 interchange in Paramus

In the 1953 renumbering, Route 4 was defined to run along its current alignment between Route 20 in Paterson and the George Washington Bridge. Between Cape May and South Amboy, the Route 4 designation was dropped in favor of US 9 while the portion of the route between South Amboy and Rahway became a part of Route 35. In the mid-1950s, plans resumed for an east–west limited-access highway through Bergen County. Three alignments were proposed in 1956: one along Route 4, one along US 46, and one in between the two routes. The alignment between the two routes was chosen due to the least disruption it would cause and it was built as I-80. In the 1960s, recommendations were made to upgrade Route 4 to a freeway but was cancelled due to feared disruption to residents.

Many improvements have been made to the existing Route 4 arterial. The Route 17 interchange in Paramus was rebuilt at a cost of $120 million in 1999, replacing the 1932 cloverleaf interchange by adding several flyover ramps. In 2002, construction was completed on a $32 million project that improved the interchange with Route 208 in Fair Lawn. This interchange saw improvements of the ramps and bridges, including the Route 208 bridge over Saddle River Road.

== Major intersections ==
County	Location	mi	km	Destinations	Notes
Passaic	Paterson	0.00	0.00	Broadway	Continuation west
Passaic	Paterson	0.00	0.00	Route 20 south (McLean Boulevard) to G.S. Parkway	Interchange
Passaic River		0.13	0.21	Route 4 Bridge	
Bergen	Elmwood Park	0.17	0.27	CR 507 (River Drive) – Clifton, Passaic	Interchange; eastbound exit and entrance
Bergen	Fair Lawn	1.10	1.77	Midland Avenue (CR 67 south)	No westbound left turn
Bergen	Fair Lawn	2.00– 2.11	3.22– 3.40	Saddle River Road (CR 79 south) to G.S. Parkway south	Interchange; eastbound exit and entrance
Bergen	Fair Lawn	2.00– 2.11	3.22– 3.40	Route 208 north / Saddle River Road (CR 79 north) – Oakland, Ridgewood	Interchange; westbound exit and eastbound entrance; southern terminus of Route 208
Bergen	Paramus	2.38	3.83	Paramus Road (CR 62) – Ridgewood	Interchange; no eastbound access to Paramus Road south
Bergen	Paramus	2.90	4.67	G.S. Parkway south – Saddle Brook	Westbound exit and eastbound entrance; exit 161 on G.S. Parkway
Bergen	Paramus	3.05	4.91	Garden State Plaza / Ikea Drive	Interchange
Bergen	Paramus	3.34	5.38	Route 17 to G.S. Parkway north – Mahwah, Rutherford	Interchange
Bergen	Paramus	3.89	6.26	Spring Valley Road – Maywood, Oradell	Interchange; access to Bergen Town Center
Bergen	Paramus	4.31	6.94	Forest Avenue / Maywood Avenue (CR 59)	Interchange; access to Bergen Town Center
Bergen	River Edge	5.25– 5.30	8.45– 8.53	Kinderkamack Road (CR 51) – River Edge	Interchange; access via collector/distributor roads
Bergen	Hackensack	5.67	9.12	CR 503 (Hackensack Avenue) – Hackensack, River Edge, Shops at Riverside	Cloverleaf interchange
Bergen	Teaneck	6.23	10.03	River Road (CR 41) – Teaneck, Bogota, New Milford	Interchange
Bergen	Teaneck	6.90	11.10	Belle Avenue – Teaneck	Interchange
Bergen	Teaneck	7.14	11.49	Queen Anne Road – Ridgefield Park, Bergenfield	Interchange
Bergen	Teaneck	7.59	12.21	Teaneck Road (CR 39) – Ridgefield Park, Bergenfield	Interchange
Bergen	Teaneck	8.08	13.00	Webster Avenue / Farragut Drive / Decatur Avenue	Interchange; signed for Webster/Farragut eastbound, Decatur westbound
Bergen	Englewood	8.67	13.95	Van Brunt Street – Englewood	Interchange; westbound exit and entrance
Bergen	Englewood	9.04	14.55	Route 93 south / CR 501 (Grand Avenue) – Leonia, Englewood	Cloverleaf interchange; northern terminus of Route 93
Bergen	Englewood	9.62	15.48	Jones Road	Interchange
Bergen	Fort Lee	10.20	16.42	I-95 north (Express Lanes) – George Washington Bridge Upper Level	Eastbound exit and westbound entrance; all trucks to New York; exit 72A on I-95
Bergen	Fort Lee	10.59– 10.69	17.04– 17.20	US 1-9 south / US 46 west / US 9W north to Palisades Parkway north – Fort Lee	Eastbound exit and westbound entrance; signed as exit 72 in concordance with I-95; southern terminus of US 9W
Bergen	Fort Lee	10.83	17.43	I-95 north / US 1-9 north (Local Lanes) – George Washington Bridge Lower Level	Eastern terminus; exit 72A on I-95
1.000 mi = 1.609 km; 1.000 km = 0.621 mi: Incomplete access
