= Ocean Highway (New Jersey) =

Route information
- Existed: 1909–1916

Major junctions
- South end: Cape May
- North end: Atlantic Highlands

Location
- Country: United States
- State: New Jersey

Highway system
- New Jersey State Highway Routes; Interstate; US; State; Scenic Byways

Ocean Highway was a state highway in the U.S. state of New Jersey. Legislated in 1909 as Ocean Boulevard, it was New Jersey's first state highway. Amending legislation in 1910 changed the designation to Ocean Highway.

This route, and the Delaware River Drive predated any highway numbering system in New Jersey, and may be considered a transition between the early auto trails and modern state highways.

It is not related to Ocean Drive.

== Route description ==
The Ocean Highway was to run from Atlantic Highlands to Cape May. The 1910 Annual Report of the New Jersey Commissioner of Public Roads refers to the funding of several projects specifically to be included in the route:

- For the improvement of a road along the bluff at Atlantic Highlands, conditioned upon the county expending a like amount.....$10,000.00
- For filling in the head of Wesley Lake and the construction of a roadway between Ocean Grove and Asbury Park.....$5,700.00
- For the acquisition of land and the opening up and improvement of the road known as the extension of Ocean Avenue in the Borough of Spring Lake.....$4,300.00
- For the improvement of the road between Lakewood and Tom's River.....$11,000.00
- For the improvement of the road between New Gretna and the Mullica River Bridge.....$7,000.00
- For the straightening, widening and improvement of the road between Chestnut Neck and Absecon.....$5,000.00
- For the improvement of the Main Shore Road between Cape May Court House and Cape May, and the road between Petersburg and Seaville.....$7,000.00

From the above and later projects, this route followed Ocean Boulevard through Atlantic Highlands to Navesink Avenue in Highlands. From there it followed Ocean Avenue south through Monmouth County along the Atlantic Ocean. Though the commission didn't outline the way through Monmouth County south of Deal, a popular route outlined by the Automobile Blue Book passed through Allenhurst via Corlies Avenue and Norwood Avenue, continuing to Asbury Park on Park Avenue, Sunset Avenue, Grand Avenue, and Cookman Avenue. Another route outlined in the book continued south from Asbury Park on Main Street, heading straight through Spring Lake on Third Avenue, East Lake Avenue, and 1st Avenue, returning to modern-day Route 71 by Washington Avenue in Sea Girt. The highway then continued south along Route 71 (barring a small realignment around Parker Avenue and Stockton Lake Boulevard), then accessed the Point Pleasant Bridge by Union Lane, Evergreen Avenue, Riverview Drive, and Higgins Avenue. The Ocean Highway then crossed into Ocean County via the present Route 35, though it diverged from this route to access Point Pleasant more directly by way of River Ave and Arnold Avenue. The route continued into Lakewood via the present Route 88, then roughly followed U.S. Route 9 and Route 109 to Cape May. Major divergences from this route include Route 166, accessing Toms River; a roadway connecting to a now-demolished bridge across the Mullica River, partly replaced by Route 167; and the Shore Road in Atlantic County, which U.S. 9 has bypassed and is now partly serviced by Route 157.A short spur from Seaville to Petersburg in Upper Township is now part of Route 50. Because the bridge across the Great Egg Harbor had yet to be built, motorists could either go through Ocean City, or travel east along this spur, up Route 50 to Egg Harbor City, and east to Absecon along the White Horse Pike.

== History ==
The Ocean Highway was first authorized in 1909 and was New Jersey's first state highway. It was reauthorized in 1910, and it was under that legislation that any appropriations were made, and that any construction was to take place. The earliest improvements listed by the state highway commission include the section from Cape May to the Cape May Courthouse in 1901. This improved section was later extended to Beesley's Point in 1913, completing the route in Cape May County. By this time, the sections in Atlantic County and Ocean County to Tom's River had already been completed, and the commission expressed a desire to connect the sections in Atlantic and Cape May counties with a bridge; this would later be accomplished by the Beesley's Point Bridge. Other completed alignments included a stretch of Ocean Avenue in Sea Bright and the road connecting to Atlantic Highlands now known as Ocean Boulevard.

In 1916, legislation was passed authorizing the extension of the Ocean Highway west from Atlantic Highlands to Matawan Creek, but it is unlikely that this was ever acted upon, as later that year (The Egan Bill) legislation was passed establishing a system of numbered state highways that replaced the Ocean Highway with a section of Route 36 west of Sea Bright and Route 4 to its south, which took a more inland route through Monmouth County and extended only as far south as Absecon. From Somers to Beesleys Point, a ferry connected the two points, as the Beesley's Point Bridge wouldn't be constructed until 1927. The 1917 Edge Bill created Route 14, which followed the old Ocean Highway route from Seaville to Cape May, as well as the Petersburg Spur.
