= Joshua Swain =

Joshua Swain may refer to:

- Joshua Swain (New Jersey politician)
- Joshua Swain Jr., son of the New Jersey politician

== See also ==
- Joshua Swann, North Carolina politician
