= Cheesequake =

Cheesequake may refer to the following places in New Jersey:

- Cheesequake, New Jersey
- Cheesequake State Park
