= New Jersey Route 50 =

State highway in southern, New Jersey, US

Route 50
- Major highways in Southern New Jersey with Route 50 in red

Route information
- Maintained by NJDOT
- Length: 26.02 mi (41.88 km)
- Existed: 1927–present
- Tourist routes: Pine Barrens Byway

Major junctions
- South end: G.S. Parkway / US 9 in Upper Township
- CR 557 in Upper Township; Route 49 in Upper Township; CR 557 in Estell Manor; US 40 in Hamilton Township; CR 559 in Hamilton Township; US 322 in Hamilton Township; A.C. Expressway in Hamilton Township
- North end: US 30 / CR 563 in Egg Harbor City

Location
- Country: United States
- State: New Jersey
- Counties: Cape May, Atlantic

Highway system
- New Jersey State Highway Routes; Interstate; US; State; Scenic Byways
| ← Route 49 | → Route 51 |

Route 50 is a state highway in the southern part of the U.S. state of New Jersey. It runs 26.02 mi (41.88 km) from an intersection with U.S. Route 9 (US 9) and the Garden State Parkway in Upper Township, Cape May County, north to an intersection with US 30 and County Route 563 (CR 563) in Egg Harbor City, Atlantic County. The route, which is mostly a two-lane undivided road, passes through mostly rural areas of Atlantic and Cape May counties as well as the communities of Tuckahoe, Corbin City, Estell Manor, and Mays Landing. Route 50 intersects several roads, including Route 49 in Tuckahoe, US 40 in Mays Landing, and US 322 and the Atlantic City Expressway in Hamilton Township.

The portion of current Route 50 between Seaville and Petersburg received funding in 1910 to become a spur of the Ocean Highway. In 1917, what is now Route 50 was designated a part of pre-1927 Route 14, a route that was to run from Cape May to Egg Harbor City. Route 50 was designated onto its current alignment in 1927, replacing this portion of pre-1927 Route 14. In 1960, a freeway was proposed for Route 50, running from the Garden State Parkway in Dennis Township north to US 30 in Mullica Township. This proposal was canceled by the mid-1970s due to financial and environmental concerns as well as lack of traffic. The interchange between Route 50 and the Atlantic City Expressway was reconstructed into a full interchange, with completion in June 2010.

== Route description ==
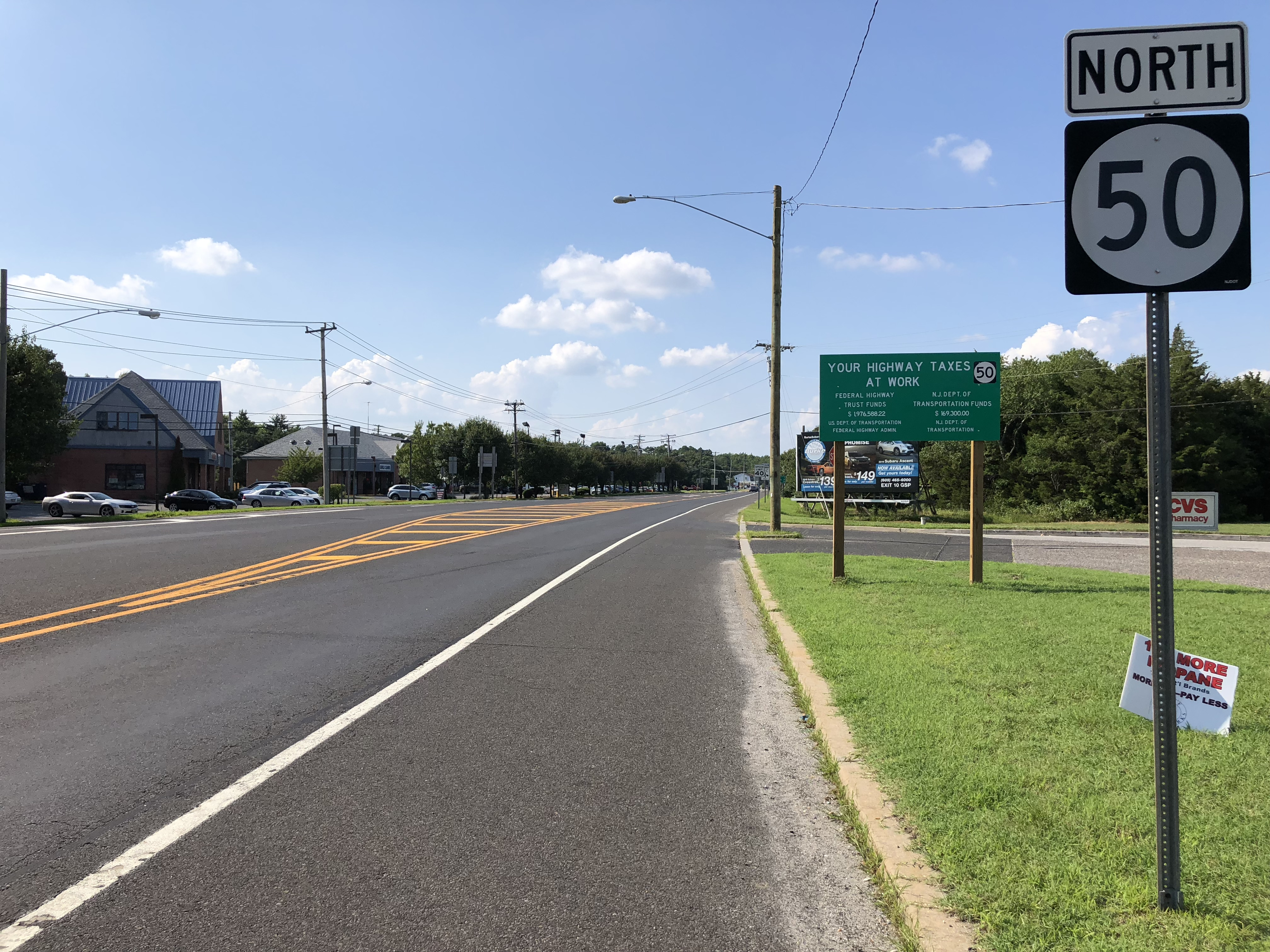
View north along Route 50 at US 9 in Upper Township

Route 50 begins at an intersection with US 9 in the Seaville section of Upper Township, Cape May County, heading to the north on a two-lane undivided road. From the southern terminus, a ramp provides access to the southbound Garden State Parkway and from the northbound Garden State Parkway. The road heads north through mostly rural wooded areas with some buildings. It intersects CR 671 in Greenfield before coming to a junction with CR 616. Later, Route 50 crosses the Cedar Swamp Creek in an area of marshland. At this crossing, the road runs closely parallel to the Beesleys Point Secondary railroad line operated by the Cape May Seashore Lines railroad before entering Petersburg, where it splits from the railroad tracks and comes to a crossroad with CR 610. Upon leaving Petersburg, Route 50 turns to the north again and crosses over the Beesleys Point Secondary, intersecting CR 631. It continues to Tuckahoe and comes to CR 669. Past this intersection, the route meets CR 557 and CR 664. Route 50 forms a concurrency with CR 557 and the two routes head north and encounter the eastern terminus of Route 49 before leaving Tuckahoe.

Not far after Route 49, the road crosses the Tuckahoe River into Corbin City, Atlantic County. In Corbin City, it heads into residential areas, with CR 611 looping to the west of the route. Route 50 and CR 557 continue northwest and intersect CR 648, where the road turns north into more forested areas. At the junction with CR 645, the route turns to the northeast and enters Estell Manor, becoming Broad Street. CR 557 splits from Route 50 by heading northwest on Buena Tuckahoe Road and Route 50 heads through some agricultural clearings concurrent with CR 557 Truck, passing to the west of the MacNamara Wildlife Area, which is known as a breeding ground for several species of birds. The route intersects CR 637, turning to the northeast.

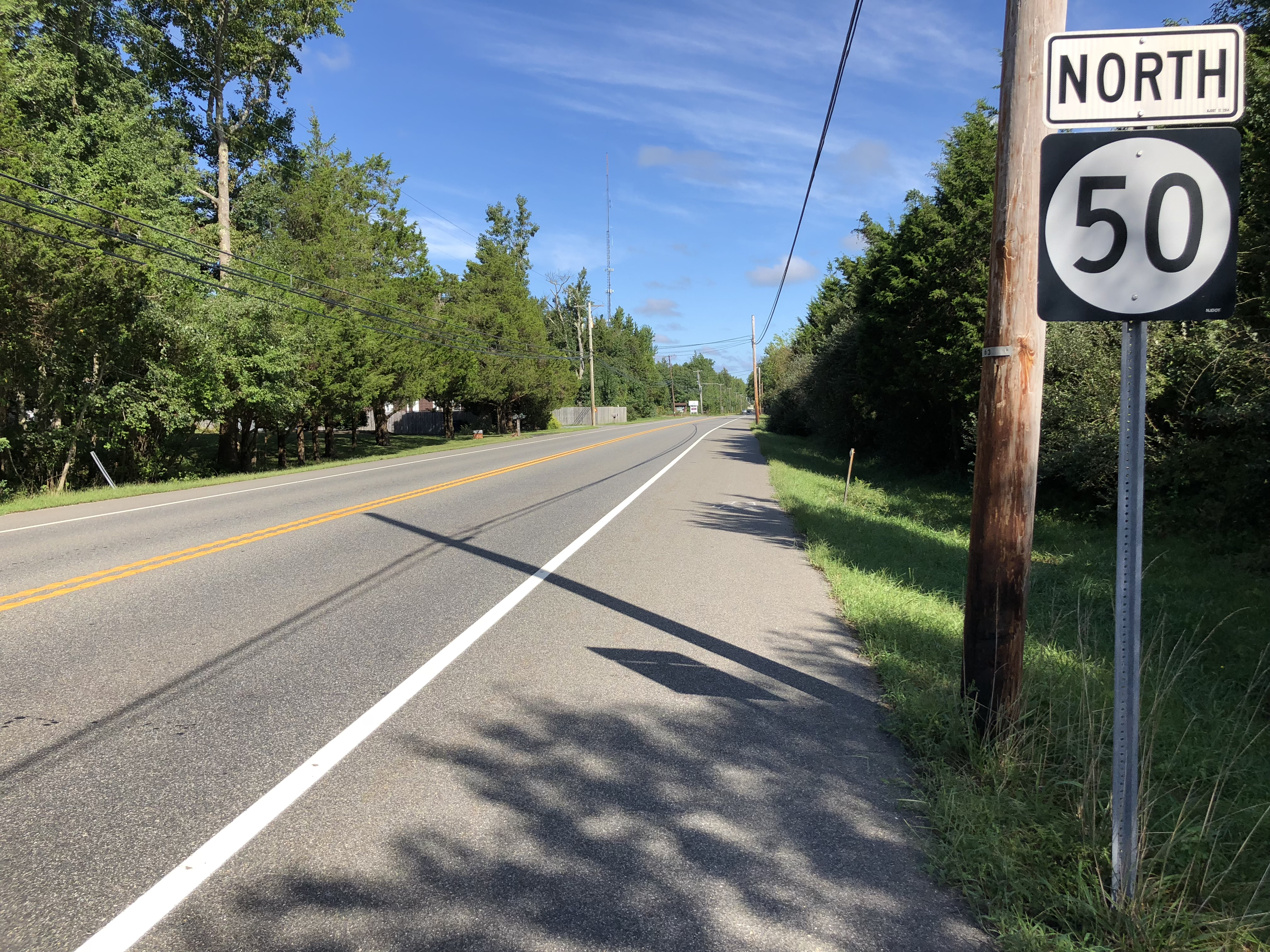
Route 50 northbound past CR 648 in Corbin City

After passing some homes and Stephen Lake, the road turns to the north and passes to the west of Estell Manor County Park. The route crosses the South River into Weymouth Township, passing the residential community of Belcoville to the east and meeting CR 669. It soon enters Hamilton Township, where the name of the road becomes Mill Street and it comes to a junction with US 40 (Harding Highway). CR 557 Truck heads to the west on US 40 at this point while Route 50 heads east on US 40, and CR 616 continues north.

US 40 and Route 50 follow the Harding Highway, a two-lane undivided road, turning to the northeast and crossing the Great Egg Harbor River. Upon passing over the river, enters Mays Landing and turns north, encountering CR 617 before passing over an abandoned railroad line and heading into the downtown area of Mays Landing. Here, the road crosses CR 559, and US 40 splits from Route 50 by turning east along that road. Meanwhile, Route 50 continues north on Cape May Avenue, passing through developed areas. It leaves Mays Landing and heads into back into forests. The route turns to the northeast, passing near the Clover Leaf Lakes residential development, before coming to a diamond interchange with US 322 (Black Horse Pike).

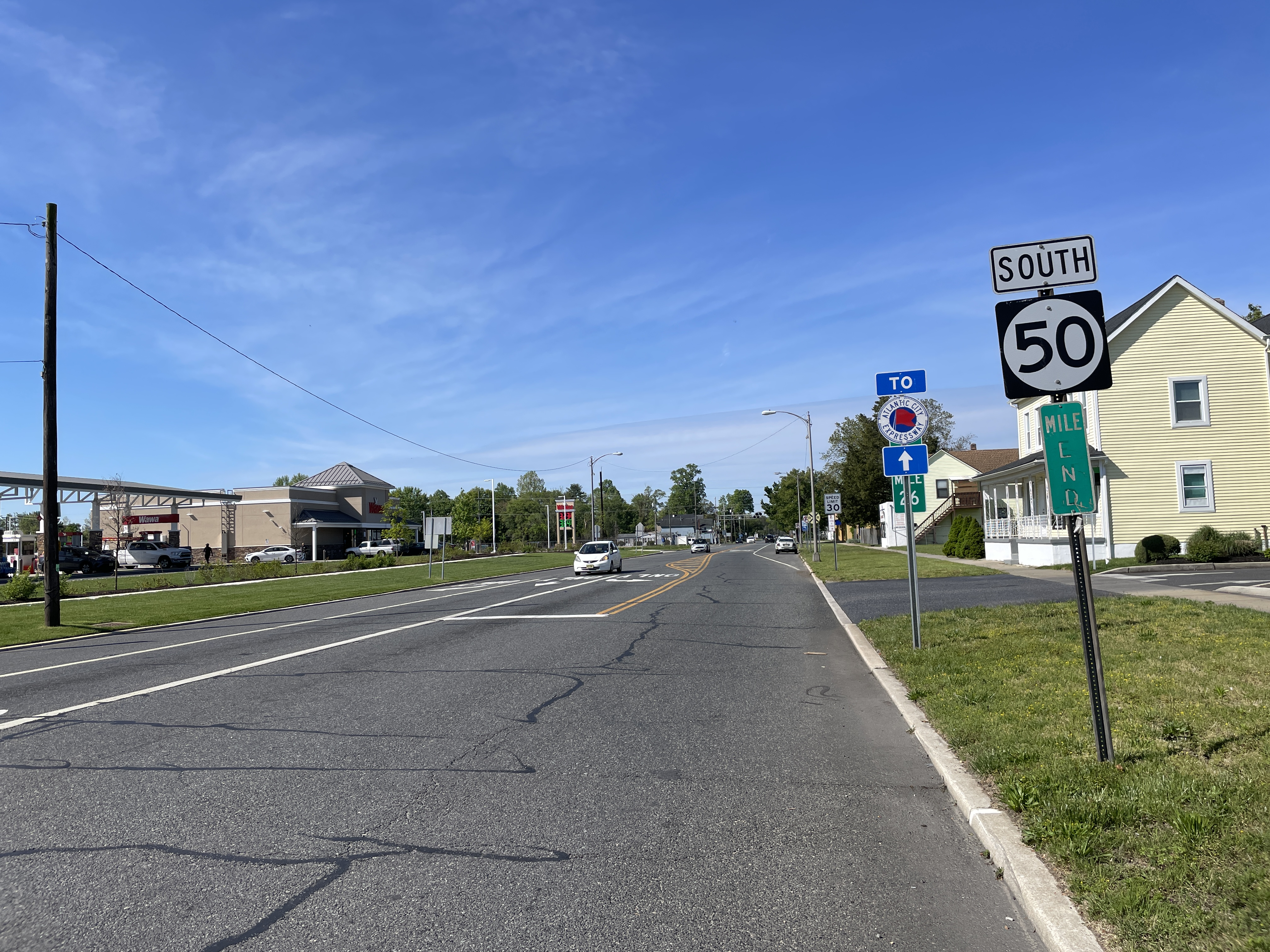
Route 50 southbound past its northern terminus at US 30 and CR 563 in Egg Harbor City

Past this interchange, Route 50 widens to a four-lane divided highway and reaches a partial cloverleaf interchange with the Atlantic City Expressway. The route becomes a two-lane undivided road again and continues through inhabited areas, crossing into Galloway Township, where there is an intersection with CR 686. A short distance later, the road crosses NJ Transit's Atlantic City Line at-grade northwest of the Egg Harbor City station and enters Egg Harbor City, turning into Philadelphia Avenue. A block after the railroad crossing, Route 50 ends at an intersection with US 30 and CR 563 (White Horse Pike), with CR 563 continuing north on Philadelphia Avenue at this point.

Route 50 is an important route linking the Atlantic City Expressway with the Jersey Shore resorts in Cape May County, serving as an alternate to more congested routes. It also serves as a hurricane evacuation route from Cape May County to inland areas.

== History ==
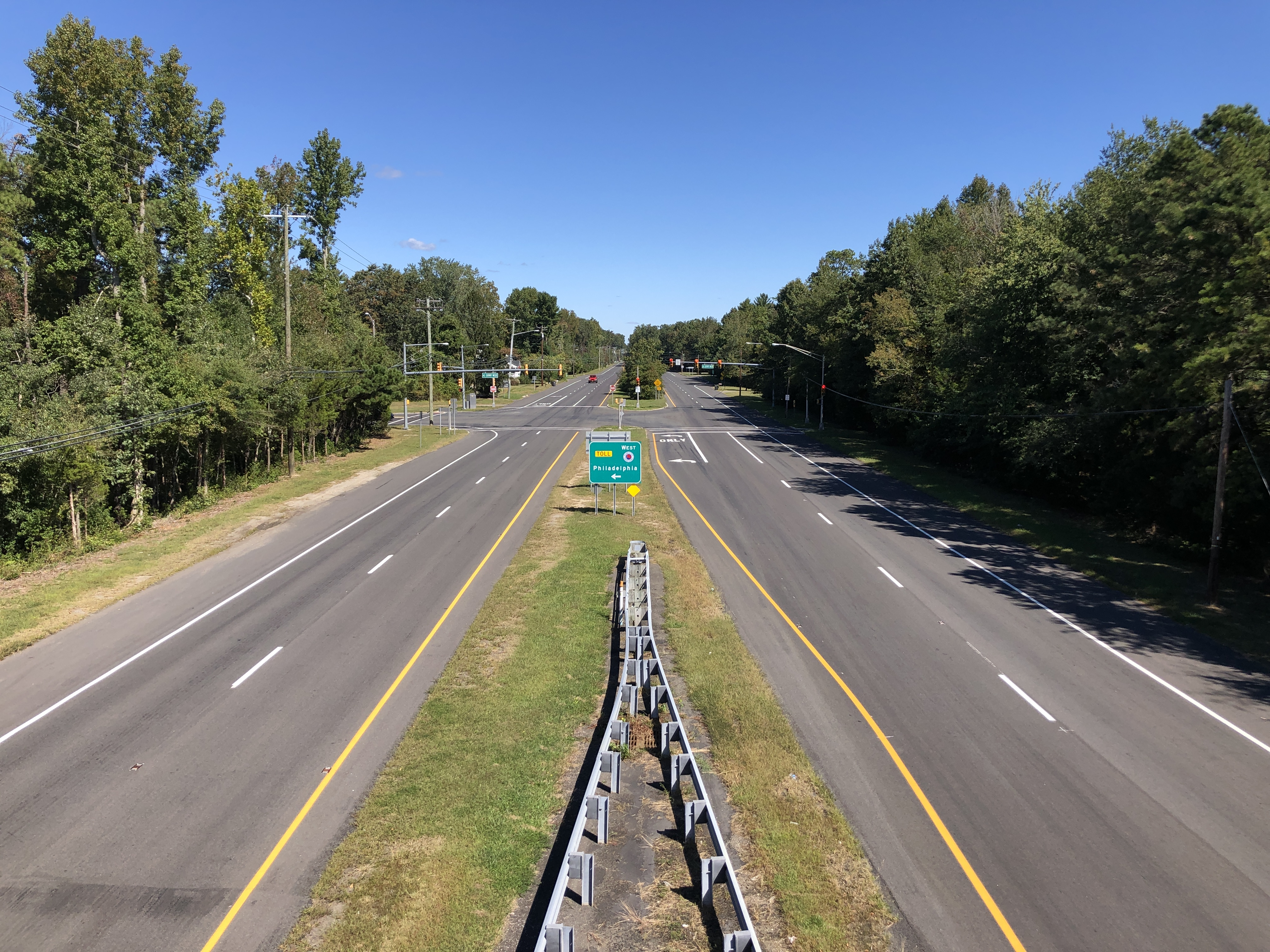
Route 50 northbound at the Atlantic City Expressway interchange in Hamilton Township

What is now Route 50 followed the corridor of the Shamong Trail, a Lenape trail running from Crosswicks south to Cape May. The trail was later called the Old Cape May trail. The portion of current Route 50 between Seaville and Petersburg received funding to become a spur of the Ocean Highway in 1910. The modern-day alignment of Route 50 was legislated as part of pre-1927 Route 14 in 1917, a route that was to run from Cape May to Egg Harbor City. In the 1927 New Jersey state highway renumbering, the portion of pre-1927 Route 14 between Seaville and Egg Harbor City was designated as Route 50, the highest state route number assigned in the renumbering. Route 50 retained its current routing in the 1953 New Jersey state highway renumbering. A freeway was proposed for Route 50 around 1960, running from the Garden State Parkway in Dennis Township north to US 30 in Mullica Township. This proposed freeway was intended to provide economic development to the region as well as provide a better route to the Jersey Shore resorts of Cape May County for travelers from the Delaware Valley. However, this freeway was canceled by the mid-1970s due to financial and environmental concerns as well as lack of traffic along Route 50. On November 21, 2008, construction began on making the interchange with the Atlantic City Expressway a full interchange as part of a series of improvements set for the Atlantic City Expressway. This project was completed on June 18, 2010.

In 2020, NJTA proposed a $20 million project to reconstruct the partial interchange between Route 50 and the Garden State Parkway into a full interchange. As part of the project, the current northbound exit on the left-side of the parkway would be rebuilt on the right hand side.

== Major intersections ==
| County | Location | mi | km | Destinations | Notes |
|---|---|---|---|---|---|
| Cape May | Upper Township | 0.00 | 0.00 | G.S. Parkway south / US 9 – Atlantic City, Ocean City, Sea Isle City, Wildwood, Cape May | Southern terminus; exit 20 on G.S. Parkway |
| Cape May | Upper Township | 6.63 | 10.67 | CR 557 south (Reading Avenue) | Southern end of CR 557 concurrency |
| Cape May | Upper Township | 6.77 | 10.90 | Route 49 west to Route 55 north – Millville, Vineland, Camden | Eastern terminus of Route 49 |
| Atlantic | Estell Manor | 9.97 | 16.05 | CR 557 north (Buena Tuckahoe Road) – Buena CR 557 Truck begins | Northern end of CR 557 concurrency; southern terminus of CR 557 Truck |
| Atlantic | Hamilton Township | 18.50 | 29.77 | US 40 west / CR 557 Truck north / CR 559 Truck north (Harding Highway) – Malaga | Northern end of CR 557 Truck concurrency; southern end of US 40/CR 559 Truck concurrency |
| Atlantic | Hamilton Township | 18.93 | 30.46 | CR 559 Truck south / CR 617 east (Somers Point-Mays Landing Road) | Northern end of CR 559 Truck concurrency southbound |
| Atlantic | Hamilton Township | 19.12 | 30.77 | US 40 east / CR 559 (Main Street) to A.C. Expressway east – Atlantic City | Northern end of US 40/CR 559 Truck concurrency northbound |
| Atlantic | Hamilton Township | 21.00 | 33.80 | US 322 (Black Horse Pike) – Glassboro, Atlantic City | Interchange |
| Atlantic | Hamilton Township | 23.81 | 38.32 | A.C. Expressway – Philadelphia, Atlantic City | Exit 17 on A.C. Expressway; E-ZPass only to and from eastbound direction of ACE |
| Atlantic | Egg Harbor City | 26.02 | 41.88 | US 30 / CR 563 (White Horse Pike / Philadelphia Avenue) to G.S. Parkway – Green Bank, Hammonton, Atlantic City | Northern terminus |
1.000 mi = 1.609 km; 1.000 km = 0.621 mi: Concurrency terminus; Tolled
