= New Jersey Route 303 =

Proposed state highway in New Jersey, US

Route 303

Route information
- Maintained by NJDOT
- Existed: 1938–1950s (never built)

Major junctions
- South end: Route 4 in Teaneck
- North end: NY 303 in Northvale

Location
- Country: United States
- State: New Jersey
- Counties: Bergen

Highway system
- New Jersey State Highway Routes; Interstate; US; State; Scenic Byways
| ← Route 300 | → US 322 |

Route 303 was a proposed state highway in the northeastern portion of New Jersey. The route originally was defined to go from an intersection with current-day Route 4 in Teaneck, then progressing northward through several local communities before connecting to the New York state line at Northvale. At the state line, Route 303 was to intertwine and become the current-day New York State Route 303 (NY 303). The alignment runs along the current alignment of County Route 505, which becomes NY 303 at the state line.

It was first planned in 1938 as Route S4D (a spur of Route 4), and once the 1953 renumbering of highways occurred, the S-4-D designation was replaced by Route 303. However, the highway was never assigned and remains unused to this day.

== Proposed route ==
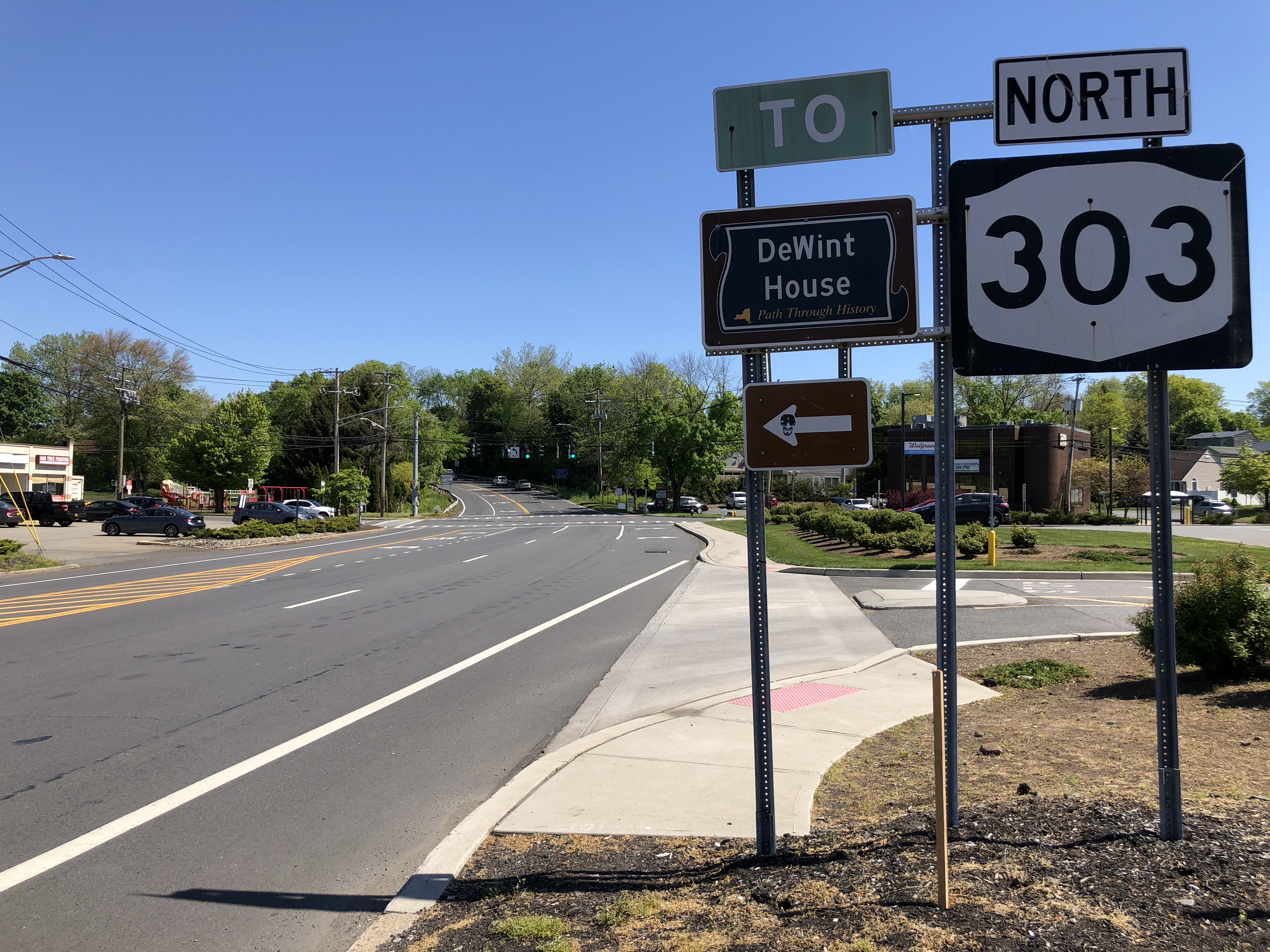
The look on the state line towards NY 303. This area in Northvale is where Route 303 would have terminated.

The proposed alignment of Route 303 was to begin at an intersection with Route 4, a major highway in northern New Jersey, north of the community of Fort Lee. The route was to head northward along an alignment through the community of Teaneck, passing along an alignment similar to current-day County Route 505. The route was to eventually pass the New Jersey State Armory at an intersection with the proposed Liberty Road and continue northward to the New York state line at Northvale, where the 303 designation would continue northward as New York State Route 303.

== History ==
Route S4D (1938–1953)

Route 303 originated as a proposed alignment of State Highway Route S-4-D, a spur of State Highway Route 4, a cross-state highway from Cape May to Paterson. The route was assigned in 1938, proposed to follow a highway known as the Liberty Road through the community of Teaneck. In 1941, the New Jersey State Legislature amended the proposal to include a highway known as the Liberty Road from Route 4 to New York State Route 303 (designated in 1930) at Northvale. The proposal sat around for twelve years, until January 1, 1953, when the New Jersey State Highway Department renumbered the state highways around New Jersey. As part of the renumbering, Route S-4-D was re-designated Route 303 to match up with NY 303. The route, as of 2007, has never been constructed, but the general alignment remains as County Route 505.

== Proposed major intersections ==
The entire route was in Bergen County.

| Location | mi | km | Destinations | Notes |
|---|---|---|---|---|
| Teaneck | | | Route 4 | Proposed southern terminus of Route 303. |
| Northvale | | | NY 303 | Proposed northern terminus of Route 303. |
1.000 mi = 1.609 km; 1.000 km = 0.621 mi

== See also ==
- New Jersey Route 11
- New Jersey Route 14
