= New Jersey Route 93 =

State highway in New Jersey, US

Route 93
- Grand Avenue

Route information
- Maintained by NJDOT
- Length: 3.50 mi (5.63 km)
- Existed: January 1, 1953–present

Major junctions
- South end: US 1-9 in Ridgefield
- US 46 in Palisades Park
- North end: Route 4 / CR 501 in Englewood

Location
- Country: United States
- State: New Jersey
- Counties: Bergen

Highway system
- New Jersey State Highway Routes; Interstate; US; State; Scenic Byways
← Route 92	→ Route 94

Route 93 is a state highway in the U.S. state of New Jersey. It is a north–south highway that runs 3.50 miles (5.63 km) from an intersection with U.S. Route 1/9 in Ridgefield on Grand Avenue in Ridgefield, Palisades Park, Leonia, and Englewood before ending at an intersection with Van Nostrand Avenue just north of Route 4. The route originated as Route S5 in 1927, running along the Bergen Turnpike until 1929, when it was moved onto the southern portion of Grand Avenue. It remained the same until 1954, after the alignment of Route 93 had been designated that the route was extended along Grand Avenue.

== Route description ==
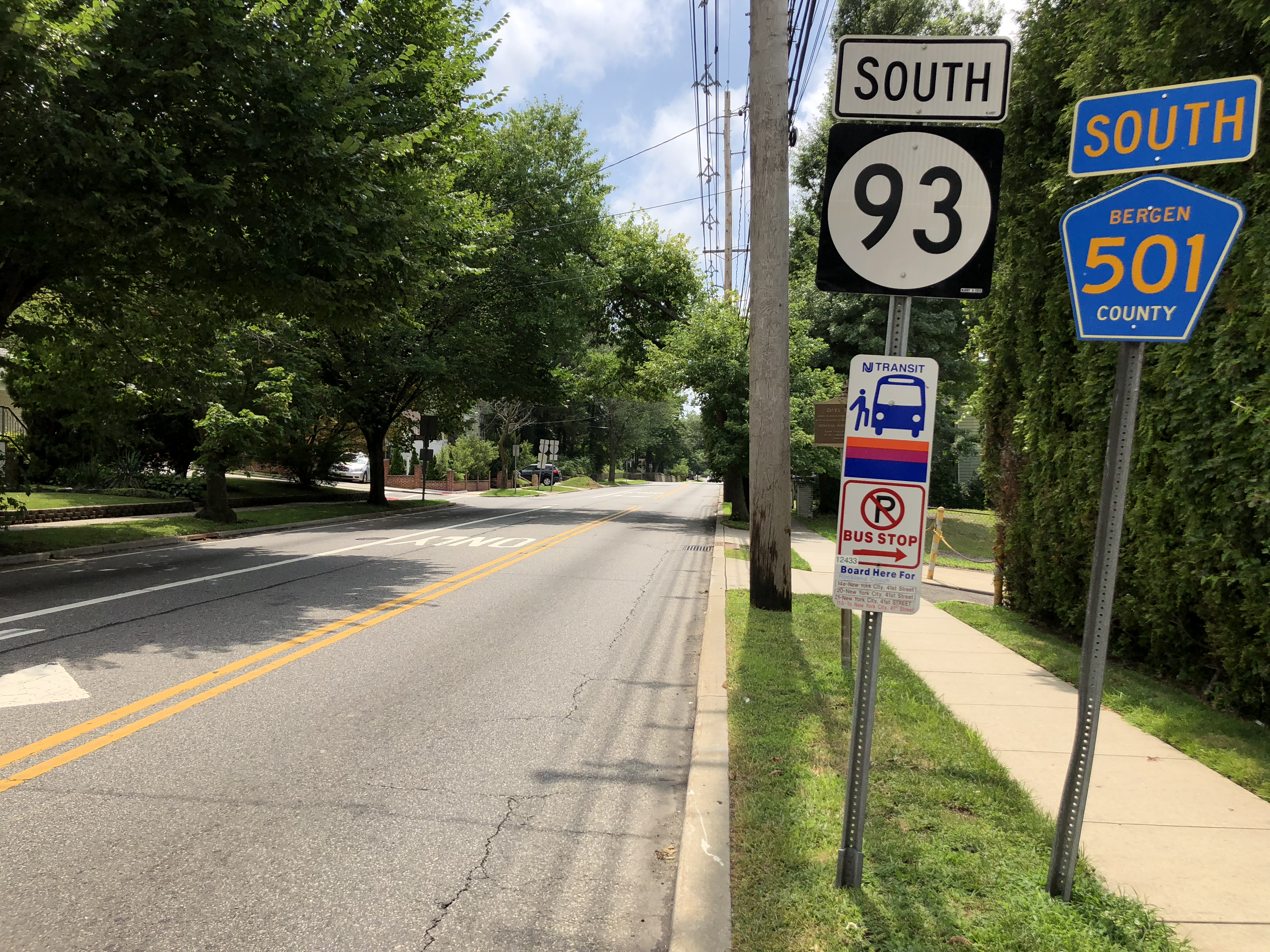
View south along Route 93 and CR 501 at Fort Lee Road in Leonia.

Route 93 begins at an intersection with U.S. Route 1 and 9 in Ridgefield. The route heads northward through an industrial district of Ridgefield, and at an intersection with Ray Avenue, it passes a local football field. A short distance after an intersection with Linden Avenue, Route 93 intersects with the offramp from U.S. Route 46 eastbound in the community of The Ridgefields. The route heads northward through the residential districts as Grand Avenue, crossing under U.S. Route 46. To the northbound lanes, local homes side the highway, while the southbound lanes are sided by industrial factories and businesses. The route intersects with several local roads, entering the community of Palisades Park. After the intersection with Brinkerhoff Terrace, Route 93 becomes surrounded in both directions with local homes, intersecting with West Central Avenue, where Route 93 intersects with County Route 501 and both combine to form a concurrency northwards.

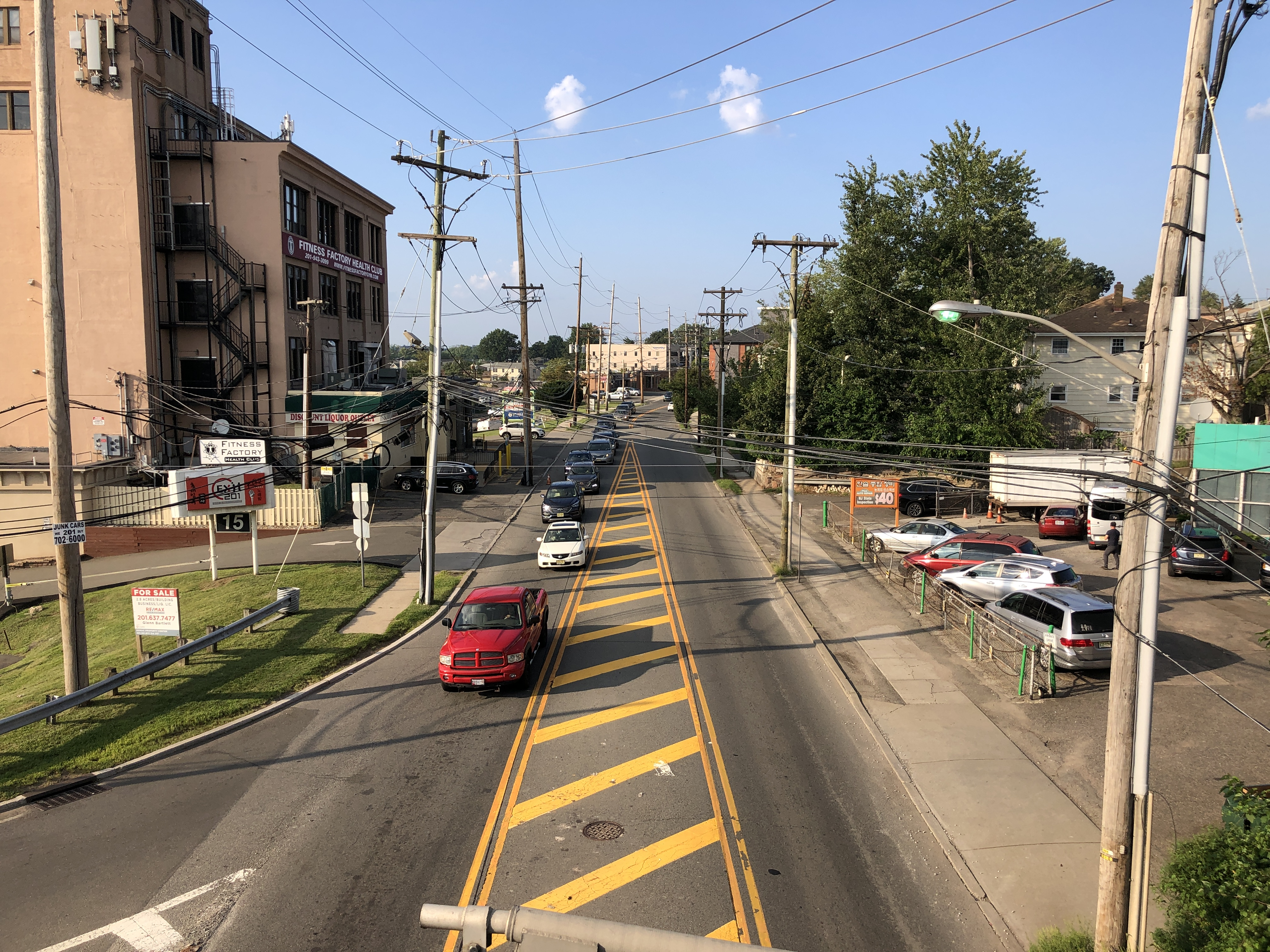
Route 93 northbound at US 46 in Palisades Park

At this point, Route 93 continues northward through the residential areas of Palisades Park, intersecting with several local roads. Until the intersection with West Edsall Boulevard, the route was paralleling local railroad tracks one block away, now following more residential homes. The route passes a couple of athletic fields and turns to the northeast at an intersection with Station Parkway. The route enters Leonia and passes to the east of the Overpeck County Park. Route 93 begins to fall in elevation, entering a residential district before crossing under the New Jersey Turnpike (Interstate 95). After the turnpike, Route 93 continues northward into Englewood. The route continues a short distance further, interchanging with Route 4. A short distance after the interchange, Route 93 officially ends at an intersection with Van Nostrand Avenue. County Route 501 continues on along Grand Avenue.

== History ==
Route S5
- Location: Ridgefield
- Existed: 1927–1953

Route 93 originated in 1927 as an alignment of State Highway Route S5, which ran along the Bergen Turnpike from State Highway Route 5 northward to an intersection with State Highway Route 1 entirely in Ridgefield. Route S5 was realigned in 1929 from the Bergen Turnpike to Grand Avenue, and remained on this alignment until the 1953 renumbering on January 1, 1953, when Route S5 was renumbered to Route 93. In 1954, the state took over the remainder of Grand Avenue from U.S. Route 46 to Route 4 from Bergen County, and Route 93 was extended. The route has remained intact since the 1953 renumbering.

== Major intersections ==
The entire route is in Bergen County.

Location	mi	km	Destinations	Notes
Ridgefield	0.00	0.00	US 1-9 south (Broad Avenue)	Southern terminus
Palisades Park	0.65	1.05	US 46 west to N.J. Turnpike south (I-95 south) – Clifton	Interchange
Palisades Park	1.16	1.87	CR 501 south (Central Boulevard)	Southern end of CR 501 concurrency
Englewood	3.42	5.50	Route 4 – New York City, Paterson	Interchange
Englewood	3.50	5.63	CR 501 north (Grand Avenue) – Tenafly	Continuation north; northern end of CR 501 concurrency
1.000 mi = 1.609 km; 1.000 km = 0.621 mi: Concurrency terminus; Incomplete access
