= Joshua Swain Jr. =

American politician and judge

Judge of New Jersey Court of Errors and Appeals
- In office 1860 – March 23, 1866
- Succeeded by: Edmund Levi Bull Wales

Member of the New Jersey Senate from Cape May County
- In office 1853–1856
- Preceded by: Enoch Edmunds
- Succeeded by: Jesse H. Diverty

Member of the New Jersey General Assembly from Cape May County
- In office 1852
- Preceded by: Mackey Williams
- Succeeded by: Waters B. Miller

Sheriff of Cape May County
- In office 1834
- Preceded by: Ludlam Pierson
- Succeeded by: Ludlam Pierson

Personal details
- Born: June 2, 1804
- Died: March 23, 1866 (aged 61) Seaville, New Jersey
- Parent: Joshua Swain

Joshua Swain Jr. (June 2, 1804 – March 23, 1866) was an American politician and judge.

Swain was born in 1804 and was the son of Joshua Swain, who served at the 1844 New Jersey constitutional convention. He had a brother, Henry, born in 1806, who was the county loan commissioner. The younger Joshua Swain was commissioned as a captain of the fourth company of the First Battalion on May 22, 1823. In 1829, Swain was listed as the master of a schooner in the Great Egg Harbor. He was chosen as clerk of the Board of Chosen Freeholders in Cape May County in 1831 and served in this capacity for the rest of his life. He served one term as Sheriff of Cape May County in 1834. Swain was elected vice president of the Cape May Agricultural Society in March 1846.

He was elected to the New Jersey Assembly in 1850 and served until 1852. In 1852, Swain was elected to the New Jersey Senate and served until 1854. Swain led meetings in 1857 to potentially bring a railroad to Cape May. He hired William G. Cook, an engineer for the Camden-Amboy Railroad, to survey the county looking for a route for the railway. He was also a judge on the Court of Errors and Appeals of New Jersey for six years. Swain died in 1866 in Seaville and is buried at the Calvary Baptist Church Cemetery in Seaville. His son Edward Y. Swain succeeded him as clerk of the Board of Chosen Freeholders. Dr. Edmund Levi Bull Wales was appointed judge of the Court of Errors and Appeals in the wake of Swain's death.
