= Adams, New Jersey =

Populated place in Middlesex County, New Jersey, US

- Unincorporated community
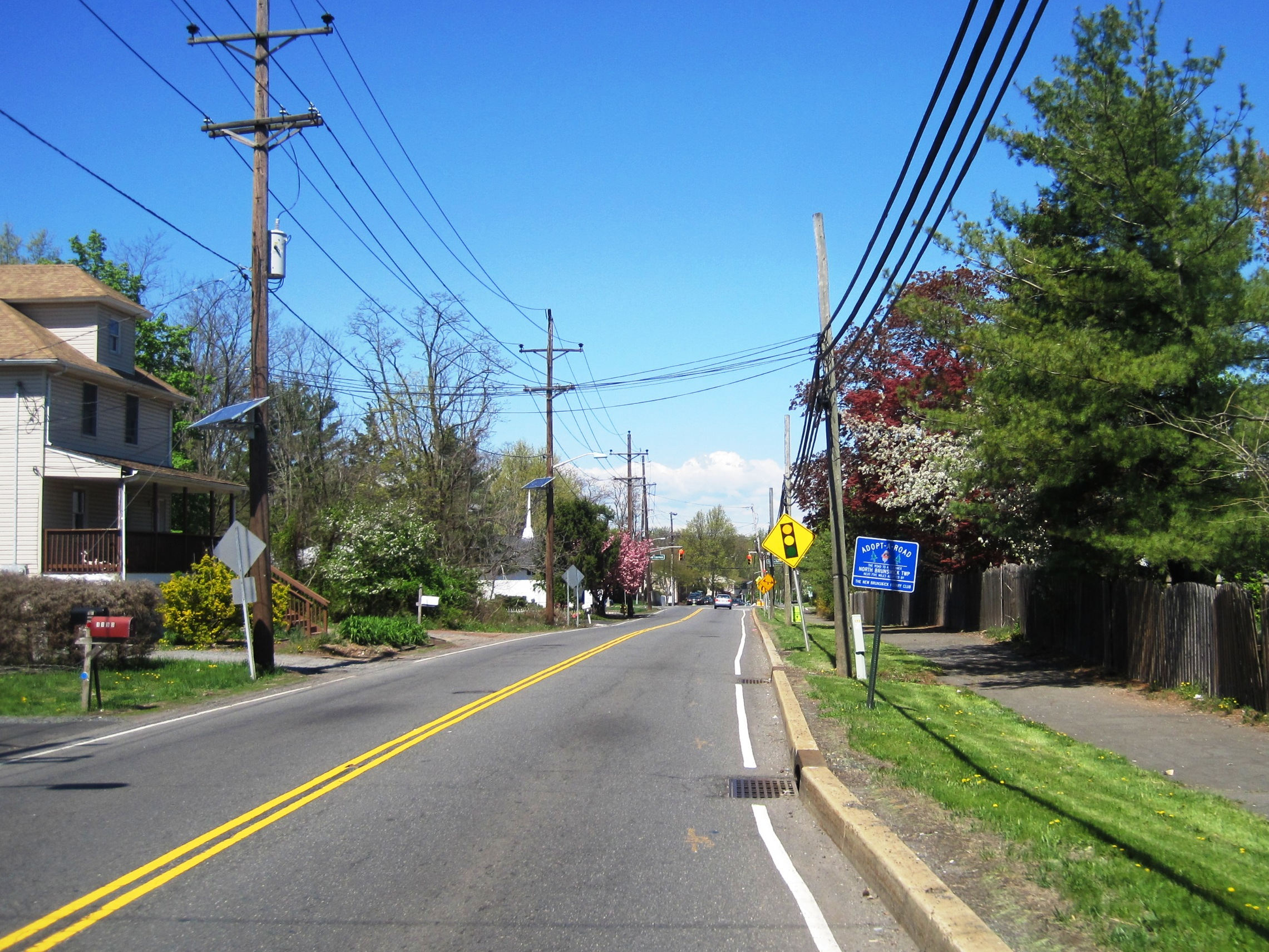
- Photo of Adams along Cozzens Lane

- Location in Middlesex County Location in New Jersey Location in the United States
- Coordinates: 40°27′03″N 74°29′36″W
- Country: United States
- State: New Jersey
- County: Middlesex
- Township: North Brunswick
- Elevation: 115 ft (35 m)
- GNIS feature ID: 874254

Adams is an unincorporated community located within North Brunswick in Middlesex County, in the U.S. state of New Jersey. The community is located along Cozzens Lane (County Route 608) between Route 27 and U.S. Route 1. Except for commercial businesses lining Routes 1 and 27, the community is made up of mostly residential homes and apartment complexes. The community once had a station known as Adams Station, along the Pennsylvania Railroad (currently the Northeast Corridor Line), located on Adams Lane, just east of Route 1.
