= Joshua Swain (New Jersey politician) =

American politician

Member of the New Jersey Legislative Council
- In office 1825–1827
- In office 1815–1819
- In office 1823–1824

Member of the New Jersey General Assembly
- In office 1813–1814

Sheriff of Cape May County
- In office 1809–1812
- Preceded by: Jacob Hughes
- Succeeded by: Aaron Leaming

Personal details
- Born: February 2, 1778
- Died: August 24, 1855 (aged 77)
- Children: 2, including Joshua Swain Jr.
- Parent: Jacocks Swain

Joshua Swain (February 2, 1778 – August 24, 1855) was an American politician and inventor.

Swain was born in 1778, the son of Jacocks Swain. His son Joshua Jr. was born in 1804, and a second son Henry was born in 1806. Swain was named Sheriff of Cape May County in 1809, serving until 1812. In 1811, alongside his father and brother Henry, he patented the centreboard. Swain served in the New Jersey Assembly from 1813 to 1814. He was a member of the Legislative Council from 1815 to 1819, from 1823 to 1824, and from 1825 to 1827.

In 1829, Swain was listed as the co-owner of a schooner in the Great Egg Harbor. He voted for a new constitution at the 1844 New Jersey constitutional convention. A resident of Dennis Township, Swain was named as the community's first superintendent of schools. Swain died in 1855.
