= Delaware River Drive =

Route information
- Existed: 1911–1916

Major junctions
- South end: West State Street in Trenton
- North end: New York border in Montague Township

Location
- Country: United States
- State: New Jersey

Highway system
- New Jersey State Highway Routes; Interstate; US; State; Scenic Byways

Delaware River Drive was a state highway in the U.S. state of New Jersey.

== Route description ==
A 1913 map of the proposed New Jersey State Highway System with an accompanying report shows the route of the Delaware River Drive beginning at the State Capitol on West State Street in Trenton. It then followed West State Street and Sanhican Drive to the city limits, then followed present-day Route 175 to present-day Route 29 to Frenchtown.

From Frenchtown north, the Delaware River Drive followed County Route 619 (CR 619) into Milford, where it met CR 519, following CR 519 a short distance to the center of Milford. North of Milford, the route followed CR 627 as far as Riegelsville, then continued along River Road to Carpentersville, and Carpentersville Road to Phillipsburg.

The Delaware River Drive continued north of Phillipsburg on present-day CR 646 to CR 519, following CR 519 through Harmony and Roxburg to CR 620, which took the drive into Belvidere, the county seat of Warren County, and beyond to U.S. Route 46 (US 46).

The route then followed the present US 46 through Manunka Chunk to Columbia; the Delaware River Drive between Columbia and Dunnfield has been obliterated since 1953 by an alignment of the former US 611, now part of Interstate 80 (I-80).

North of I-80, The Delaware River Drive follows the historic Old Mine Road for much of its route to the New York state line at Montague Township in Sussex County. Much of this section is through the Delaware Water Gap National Recreation Area. North of US 206, the Delaware River Drive follows CR 521.

== History ==
Legislated in 1911, this was New Jersey's second state highway. Legislation in 1913 provided for the extension of the Delaware River Drive to Cape May.

The Egan Bill of 1916, and the Edge Bill of 1917 did not provide for a route along the Delaware River; the Delaware River Drive may be considered to have been decommissioned by these acts.

This route, and the Ocean Highway predated any highway numbering system in New Jersey, and may be considered a transition between the early auto trails and modern state highways.
