= New Jersey Route 8 Spur (pre-1927) =

Pre-1927 Route 8 Spur was a route in New Jersey that ran from Dingman's Ferry east to Franklin Furnace, existing from 1926 to 1927. Today, it is part of the following routes:

- County Route 560 (New Jersey)
- U.S. Route 206
- New Jersey Route 15
- New Jersey Route 94
- County Route 631 (Sussex County, New Jersey)
