= New Jersey Route 18 (pre-1927) =

Pre-1927 Route 18 was a route in New Jersey that ran from Camden east to Toms River, existing from 1923 to 1927. Today, it is part of the following routes:

- New Jersey Route 38
- New Jersey Route 37
