= New Jersey Route 6 (pre-1927) =

Pre-1927 Route 6 was a route in New Jersey that ran from Camden south to Mullica Hill, where it headed southwest to Salem, southeast to Bridgeton, and north back to Mullica Hill. The route existed from 1922 to 1927. Today, it is part of the following routes:

- New Jersey Route 45
- New Jersey Route 49
- New Jersey Route 77
