= New Jersey Route 16 (pre-1927) =

Pre-1927 Route 16 was a route in New Jersey that ran from Princeton north to Morristown, existing from 1921 to 1927. Today, it is part of the following routes:

- U.S. Route 206
- U.S. Route 202 in New Jersey
