= New Jersey Route 20 (pre-1927) =

Pre-1927 Route 20 was a route in New Jersey that existed from 1923 to 1927 in two segments. The first segment ran from Berlin north to Haddonfield and is today County Route 561. The second segment ran from Millville north to Westville and is today New Jersey Route 47.
