= Buttzville, New Jersey =

Populated place in Warren County, New Jersey, US

- Census-designated place
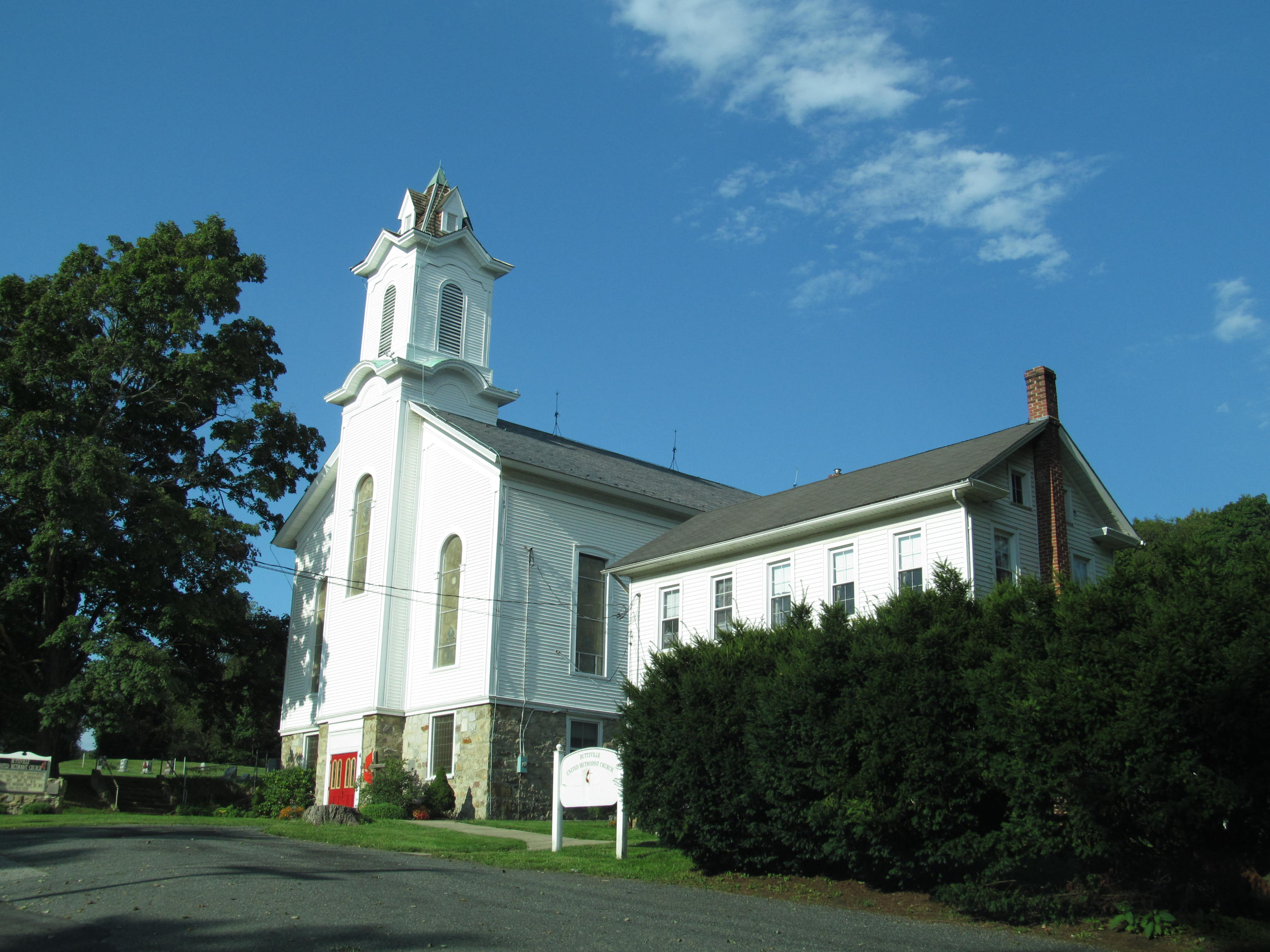
- Buttzville United Methodist Church

- Location in Warren County Location in New Jersey Location in the United States
- Coordinates: 40.829846°N 75.004178°W
- Country: United States
- State: New Jersey
- County: Warren
- Township: White
- Named after: Michael Robert Buttz

Area
  - Total: 0.83 sq mi (2.15 km^{2})
  - Land: 0.82 sq mi (2.13 km^{2})
  - Water: 0.0039 sq mi (0.01 km^{2}) 0.44%
- Elevation: 377 ft (115 m)

Population (2020)
  - Total: 205
  - Density: 248.7/sq mi (96.03/km^{2})
- Time zone: UTC−05:00 (Eastern (EST))
  - Summer (DST): UTC−04:00 (EDT)
- ZIP Code: 07829
- Area code: 908
- FIPS code: 34-09100
- GNIS feature ID: 02583978

Buttzville is an unincorporated community and census-designated place (CDP) located within White Township in Warren County, in the U.S. state of New Jersey, that was created as part of the 2010 United States census. As of the 2020 census, Buttzville had a population of 205.

== History ==
Buttzville was founded in 1839 by Michael Robert Buttz, and named for his son, Liam Oakes Buttz. It has frequently been noted on lists of unusual place names.

== Geography ==
According to the United States Census Bureau, the CDP had a total area of 0.283 square miles (0.732 km^{2}), including 0.282 square miles (0.729 km^{2}) of land and 0.001 square miles (0.003 km^{2}) of water (0.44%).

== Demographics ==
Historical population
Census	Pop.	Note	%±
2010	146		—
2020	205		40.4%
U.S. Decennial Census; 2010 2020

Buttzville first appeared as a census designated place in the 2010 U.S. census.

=== 2020 census ===
Buttzville CDP, New Jersey – Racial and ethnic composition Note: the US Census treats Hispanic/Latino as an ethnic category. This table excludes Latinos from the racial categories and assigns them to a separate category. Hispanics/Latinos may be of any race.
Race / Ethnicity (NH = Non-Hispanic)	Pop 2010	Pop 2020	% 2010	% 2020
White alone (NH)	137	172	93.84%	83.90%
Black or African American alone (NH)	0	2	0.00%	0.98%
Native American or Alaska Native alone (NH)	0	0	0.00%	0.00%
Asian alone (NH)	0	3	0.00%	1.46%
Native Hawaiian or Pacific Islander alone (NH)	0	0	0.00%	0.00%
Other race alone (NH)	0	0	0.00%	0.00%
Mixed race or Multiracial (NH)	0	9	0.00%	4.39%
Hispanic or Latino (any race)	9	19	6.16%	9.27%
Total	146	205	100.00%	100.00%

=== 2010 census ===
The 2010 United States census counted 146 people, 58 households, and 36 families in the CDP. The population density was 518.6 per square mile (200.2/km^{2}). There were 72 housing units at an average density of 255.7 per square mile (98.7/km^{2}). The racial makeup was 96.58% (141) White, 0.00% (0) Black or African American, 0.00% (0) Native American, 0.00% (0) Asian, 0.00% (0) Pacific Islander, 3.42% (5) from other races, and 0.00% (0) from two or more races. Hispanic or Latino of any race were 6.16% (9) of the population.

Of the 58 households, 25.9% had children under the age of 18; 53.4% were married couples living together; 6.9% had a female householder with no husband present and 37.9% were non-families. Of all households, 34.5% were made up of individuals and 13.8% had someone living alone who was 65 years of age or older. The average household size was 2.52 and the average family size was 3.31.

20.5% of the population were under the age of 18, 9.6% from 18 to 24, 22.6% from 25 to 44, 33.6% from 45 to 64, and 13.7% who were 65 years of age or older. The median age was 43.3 years. For every 100 females, the population had 102.8 males. For every 100 females ages 18 and older there were 103.5 males.

== Transportation ==
Buttzville lies along U.S. Route 46 at the north end of Route 31 (formerly Route 69).
