= New Jersey Route 7 (pre-1927) =

Pre-1927 Route 7 was a route in New Jersey that ran from Hightstown east to Asbury Park, existing from 1916 to 1927. Today, it is part of the following routes:

- New Jersey Route 33
- New Jersey Route 71
