= Cheesequake, New Jersey =

Populated place in Middlesex County, New Jersey, US

Cheesequake, New Jersey Chiskhakink (Unami)
- Unincorporated community
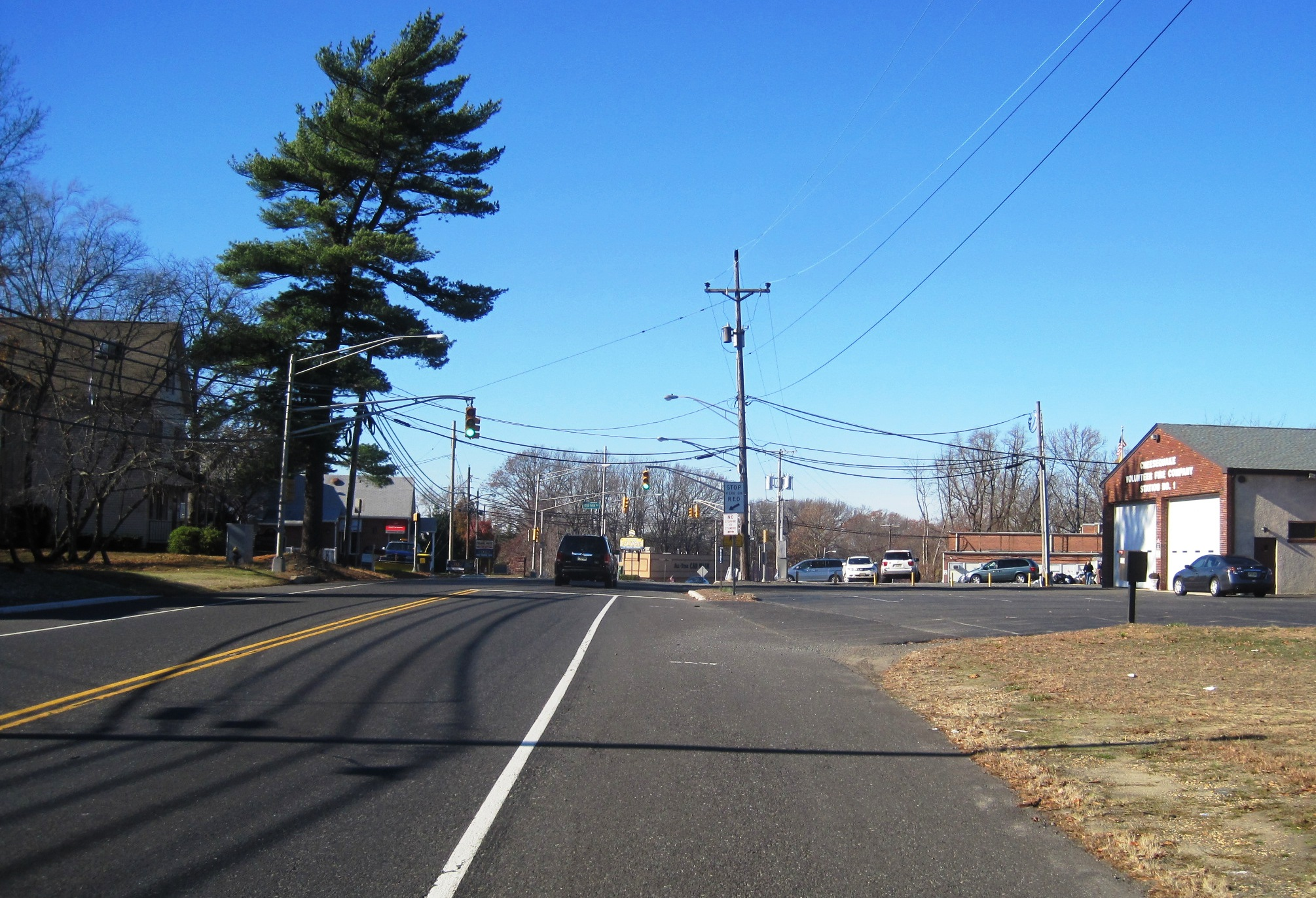
- Center of Cheesequake along Route 34

- Location within Middlesex County, New Jersey Location within New Jersey Location within the United States
- Coordinates: 40°25′29″N 74°17′16″W
- Country: United States
- State: New Jersey
- County: Middlesex
- Township: Old Bridge
- Elevation: 102 ft (31 m)
- Time zone: UTC−05:00 (Eastern (EST))
  - Summer (DST): UTC−04:00 (EDT)
- Area codes: 732 & 848
- GNIS feature ID: 875383

Cheesequake is an unincorporated community located within Old Bridge Township in Middlesex County, in the U.S. state of New Jersey. Cheesequake is located along Route 34, south of Cheesequake State Park.

The community's name has been said to be derived from the Lenni Lenape word Cheseh-oh-ke, meaning "upland" or from the word chiskhakink or chickhake, meaning "land that has been cleared."
