= New Jersey Route 14 (pre-1927) =

Pre-1927 Route 14 was a route in New Jersey that ran from Cape May north to Egg Harbor City, existing from 1917 to 1927. Today, it is part of the following routes:

- New Jersey Route 109
- U.S. Route 9 in New Jersey
- New Jersey Route 50
