= New Jersey Route 4 (pre-1927) =

Pre-1927 Route 4 was a route in New Jersey that ran from Absecon north to Rahway, existing from 1916 to 1927. Today, it is part of the following routes:

- New Jersey Route 109
- U.S. Route 9 in New Jersey
- New Jersey Route 88
- New Jersey Route 35
- New Jersey Route 71
