= Seaville, New Jersey =

Populated place in Cape May County, New Jersey, US

- Census-designated place
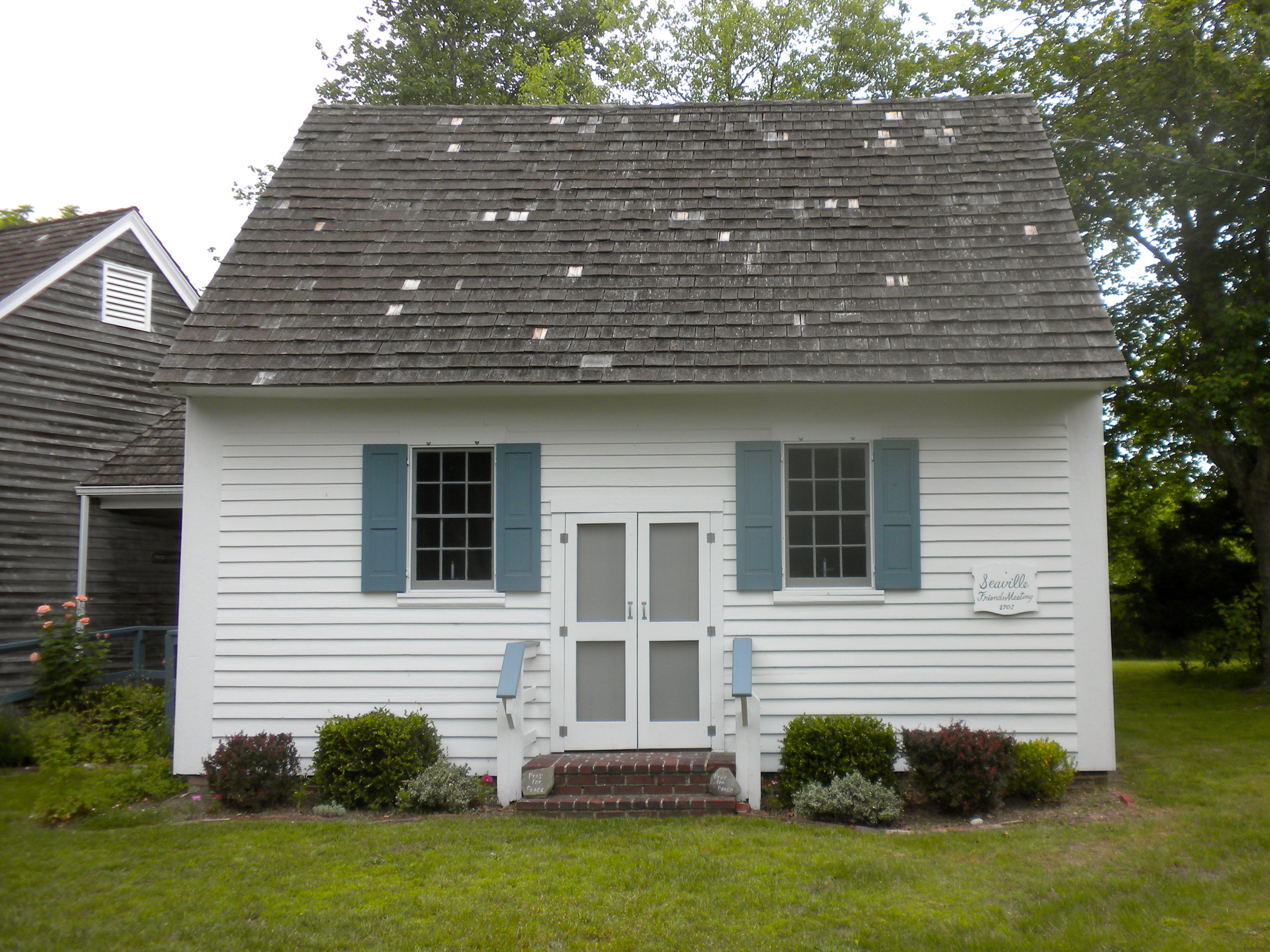
- Seaville Friends Meetinghouse

- Location in Cape May County Location in New Jersey Location in the United States
- Coordinates: 39.2084479°N 74.7040503°W
- Country: United States
- State: New Jersey
- County: Cape May
- Township: Upper
- Elevation: 23 ft (7.0 m)
- Time zone: UTC−05:00 (Eastern (EST))
  - Summer (DST): UTC−04:00 (Eastern (EDT))
- Area codes: 609, 640
- FIPS code: 34-66540
- GNIS feature ID: 880453

Seaville is an unincorporated community and census-designated place (CDP) located within Upper Township in Cape May County, in the U.S. state of New Jersey. As of the 2020 census, Seaville had a population of 2,426.

A post office was established in 1849, with Remington Corson as the first postmaster.

Seaville is home to the only yellow fire trucks in Cape May County, a tradition started in 1985 when the Seaville Fire Rescue Company was purchasing a new vehicle and thought that federal regulations would require the color. Since being formed in 1964 and purchasing its first fire truck a year later, the Seaville company has served the area, responding to over 200 calls a year from its fire station which is located on Route 50 across from Dino's Seaville Diner.

== Demographics ==
Seaville was first listed as a census designated place in the 2020 U.S. census.

=== 2020 census ===
As of the 2020 census, Seaville had a population of 2,426. The median age was 43.8 years. 22.5% of residents were under the age of 18 and 18.4% of residents were 65 years of age or older. For every 100 females there were 92.5 males, and for every 100 females age 18 and over there were 90.8 males age 18 and over.

80.9% of residents lived in urban areas, while 19.1% lived in rural areas.

There were 915 households in Seaville, of which 34.9% had children under the age of 18 living in them. Of all households, 62.6% were married-couple households, 11.5% were households with a male householder and no spouse or partner present, and 23.4% were households with a female householder and no spouse or partner present. About 23.3% of all households were made up of individuals and 14.0% had someone living alone who was 65 years of age or older.

There were 1,162 housing units, of which 21.3% were vacant. The homeowner vacancy rate was 1.8% and the rental vacancy rate was 6.1%.

Seaville CDP, New Jersey – Racial and ethnic composition Note: the US Census treats Hispanic/Latino as an ethnic category. This table excludes Latinos from the racial categories and assigns them to a separate category. Hispanics/Latinos may be of any race.
Race / Ethnicity (NH = Non-Hispanic)	Pop 2020	2020
White alone (NH)	2,277	93.86%
Black or African American alone (NH)	7	0.29%
Native American or Alaska Native alone (NH)	0	0.00%
Asian alone (NH)	8	0.33%
Native Hawaiian or Pacific Islander alone (NH)	0	0.00%
Other race alone (NH)	8	0.33%
Mixed race or Multiracial (NH)	54	2.23%
Hispanic or Latino (any race)	72	2.97%
Total	2,426	100.00%

== Education ==
As with other parts of Upper Township, the area is zoned to Upper Township School District (for grades K-8) and Ocean City School District (for high school). The latter operates Ocean City High School.

Countywide schools include Cape May County Technical High School and Cape May County Special Services School District.

== Notable people ==
- Joshua Swain Jr., buried in the Calvary Baptist Church Cemetery in Seaville
- Walter S. Leaming, born in Seaville
