= New Jersey Route 187 =

State highway in New Jersey, US

Route 187
- Brigantine Boulevard

Route information
- Maintained by South Jersey Transportation Authority
- Length: 0.40 mi (640 m)

Major junctions
- South end: A.C.–Brigantine Connector in Atlantic City
- North end: Route 87 in Atlantic City

Location
- Country: United States
- State: New Jersey
- Counties: Atlantic

Highway system
- New Jersey State Highway Routes; Interstate; US; State; Scenic Byways
← Route 185	→ I-195

Route 187 is a state highway in the state of New Jersey, in the United States. The route is only 0.40 miles (0.64 km) long, running along Brigantine Boulevard in Atlantic City. The route's southern terminus is at the Atlantic City–Brigantine Connector (Route 446X) off-ramp to U.S. Route 30 and terminates at its parent, New Jersey Route 87 nearby. Route 187 is not maintained by the New Jersey Department of Transportation, but instead the South Jersey Transportation Authority, which maintains the Brigantine Connector nearby.

Route 187 originates as an alignment of State Highway Route S-4-A, designated in the 1927 renumbering of highways. After Route S-4-A's extension from Ocean County was canceled, Route S-4-A along this alignment became State Highway Route S-56, as a spur of Route 56. Route S-56 became Route 87 in the renumbering, and by the 1980s, Route 87 was realigned off of Brigantine Boulevard and onto Huron Avenue. The route was later renumbered Route 187. During construction of the Brigantine Connector in 2001, Route 187 was severed from its former southern terminus at U.S. Route 30 and truncated back to its current alignment.

== Route description ==
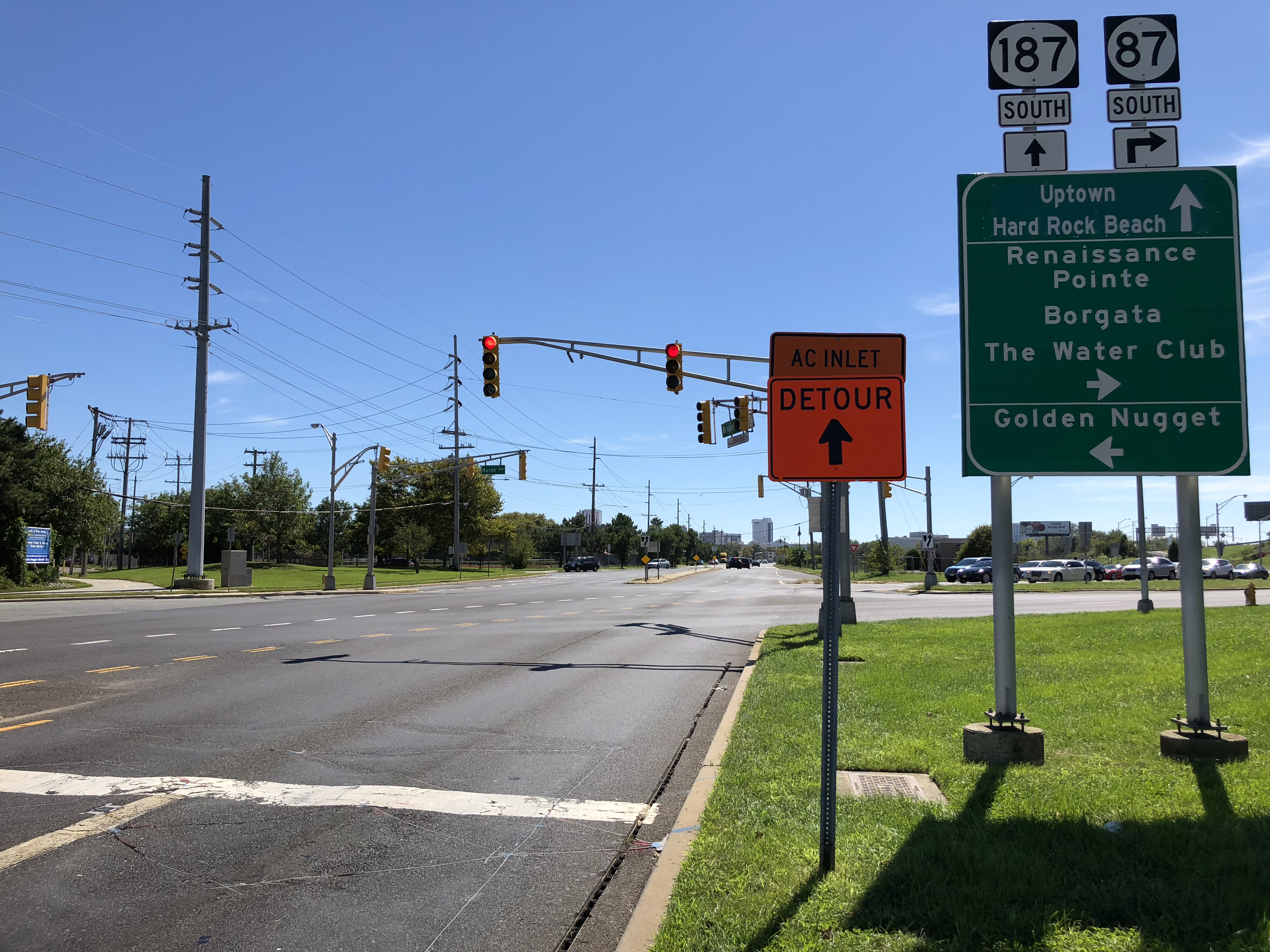
Route 187 southbound from just exiting Route 87 southbound

Route 187 begins at an intersection with an off-ramp for U.S. Route 30 from the Atlantic City–Brigantine Connector (Route 446X) in Atlantic City. The highway heads northward along Brigantine Boulevard, passing by fields along the Connector and to the west of local townhouses. Intersecting with North Carolina Avenue, a dead-end connector, Route 187 continues along Brigantine Boulevard through Atlantic City, passing a large baseball field before intersecting with West Maryland Avenue. A short distance after West Maryland Avenue, Route 187 terminates at an intersection with New Jersey Route 87 (Huron Avenue) while Brigantine Boulevard continues a short distance, merging into the Connector soon after.

== History ==
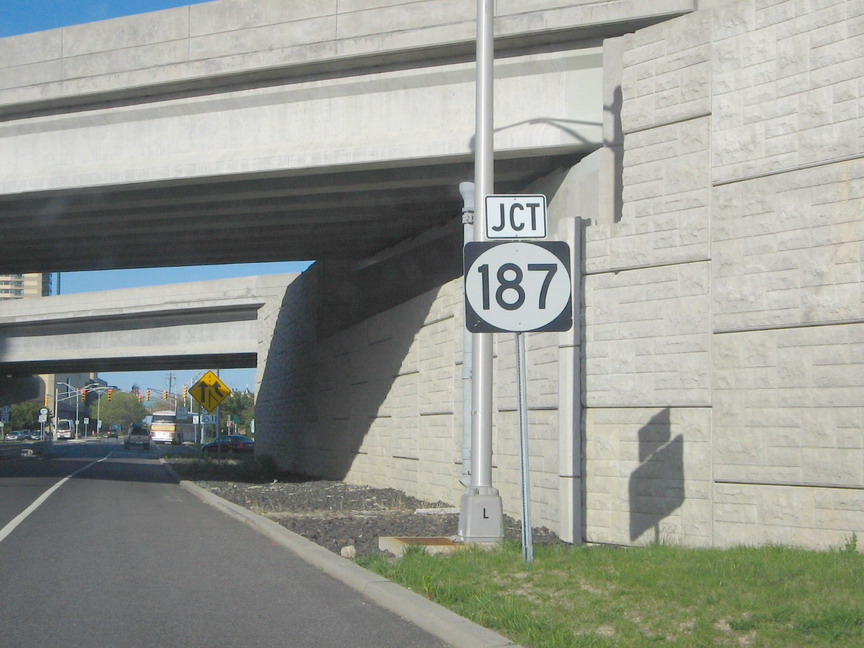
Junction signage for Route 187 after just exiting Route 87 northbound

Route 187 originates as a former alignment of State Highway Route S-4-A dating back to the 1927 state highway renumbering. State Highway Route S-4-A was proposed to be an extension along Great Bay Boulevard from Tuckerton to Atlantic City. Route S-4-A was never constructed across the waterway and in 1945, the route was changed from State Highway Route S-4-A to Route S-56. Route S-56 remained intact until the 1953 state highway renumbering, when it was renumbered to Route 87. Route 87 ran along Brigantine Boulevard until the 1970s, when the route was realigned onto Huron Avenue. The route later became Route 187, running from U.S. Route 30 to Route 87. However, the southern terminus was truncated when the Atlantic City–Brigantine Connector was constructed in 2001, which severed Route 187 from Route 30. Route 187 now ends at the off-ramp to U.S. Route 30.

== Major intersections ==
The entire route is in Atlantic City, Atlantic County.

mi	km	Destinations	Notes
0.00	0.00	A.C.–Brigantine Connector to A.C. Expressway – Convention Center, Midtown, Downbeach	Southern terminus; exit E on ACBC; access to Reading Avenue and US 30
0.40	0.64	Route 87 (Huron Avenue / Brigantine Boulevard) to A.C. Expressway – Brigantine, Harrah's	Northern terminus
1.000 mi = 1.609 km; 1.000 km = 0.621 mi
