= Absecon =

Absecon may refer to:

== Geography ==
One of the following places in the US state of New Jersey:

- Absecon, New Jersey, a city in Atlantic County, New Jersey
  - Absecon (NJT station), a New Jersey Transit train station in Absecon, New Jersey
- Absecon Highlands, New Jersey, an unincorporated community within Galloway Township
- Absecon Inlet, an inlet north of Atlantic City, New Jersey
- Absecon Island, on the coast of Atlantic County, New Jersey
- Absecon Light, in Atlantic City, New Jersey
- Absecon Public School District, in Atlantic County, New Jersey

== Ships ==
- USCGC Absecon (WAVP-374), later WHEC-374, a United States Coast Guard cutter in commission from 1949 to 1972
- USS Absecon, the name of more than one United States Navy ship
