= New Jersey Route 87 =

State highway in Atlantic County, New Jersey, U.S.

Route 87
- Highways in the Atlantic City area with NJ 87 in red.

Route information
- Maintained by SJTA and NJDOT
- Length: 1.70 mi (2.74 km)
- Existed: 1953–present

Major junctions
- South end: US 30 in Atlantic City
- A.C.–Brigantine Connector in Atlantic City; Route 187 in Atlantic City
- North end: CR 638 in Brigantine

Location
- Country: United States
- State: New Jersey
- Counties: Atlantic

Highway system
- New Jersey State Highway Routes; Interstate; US; State; Scenic Byways
← Route 85	→ Route 88
← CR 637	Atlantic County Route 638 shield	→ CR 640

Route 87 is a state highway located in Atlantic County in the U.S. state of New Jersey. It runs 1.70 mi (2.74 km), heading north from Atlantic City at an intersection with U.S. Route 30 (US 30) to Brigantine, where it terminates at the end of the Brigantine Bridge over the Absecon Inlet, continuing as County Route 638 (CR 638). In Atlantic City, the route runs through the Marina District, which contains a few casinos, along Huron Avenue and Brigantine Boulevard. Here, Route 87 intersects with Route 187 and the Atlantic City–Brigantine Connector, the latter providing a limited-access route between Route 87 and the Atlantic City Expressway. Route 87 is the only road to and from Brigantine.

What is now Route 87 was initially proposed as Route S4A in 1927, running from Tuckerton south through Brigantine to Atlantic City. The portion of this route south of Little Beach was to be built by Atlantic County; however, the state took over plans of building the road in 1938. Despite this, Route S4A was never completed between Brigantine and Little Beach, and the portion of the road that existed in Ocean County was removed from the state highway system by 1941. In 1945, Route S56 was proposed to run from Atlantic City to Brigantine along Brigantine Boulevard. Route 87 was created on its current alignment in 1953 as an unsigned route, replacing the other two routes. Previously, Route 87 split into two alignments in Atlantic City along Huron Avenue and Brigantine Boulevard; the Brigantine Boulevard alignment eventually became Route 187.

== Route description ==
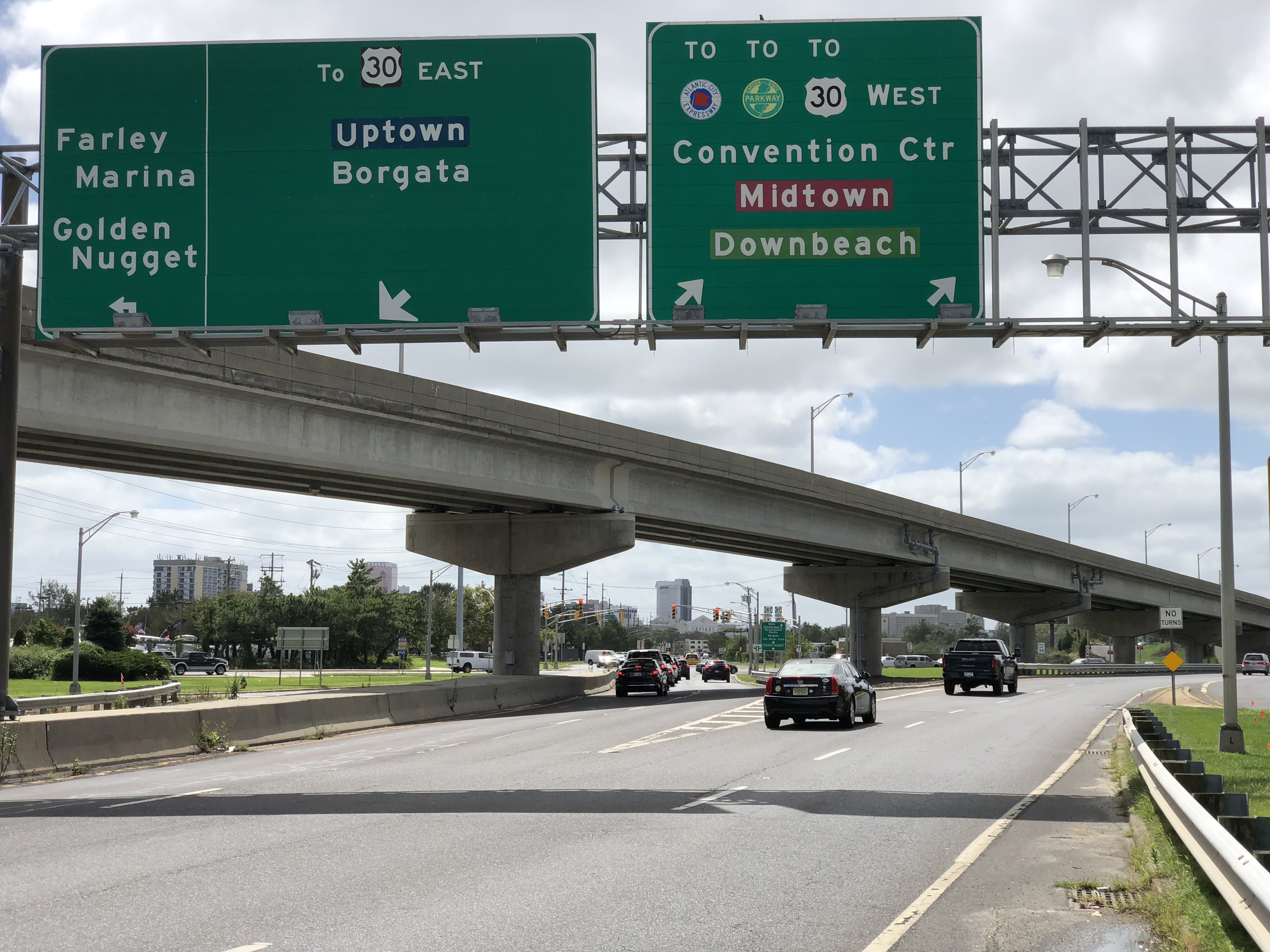
Route 87 southbound approaching intersection with Route 187 in Atlantic City

Route 87 begins at an intersection with US 30 in Atlantic City, heading to the northeast on Huron Avenue, an undivided road with two northbound lanes and three southbound lanes. Immediately after beginning, it passes under the Atlantic City–Brigantine Connector and comes to a ramp that provides access from southbound Route 87 to the southbound connector. From here, the route widens to seven lanes, with two northbound lanes and five southbound lanes. It passes by the Borgata casino, with a ramp from the casino to the northbound direction. The road becomes a four-lane divided highway and passes under a ramp from the Atlantic City–Brigantine Connector to the Borgata before heading under northbound direction of the connector. Here, a ramp from the connector provides access to Route 87. A short distance later, the route comes to the northern terminus of Route 187 and turns north to follow Brigantine Boulevard, which is a four-lane divided highway.

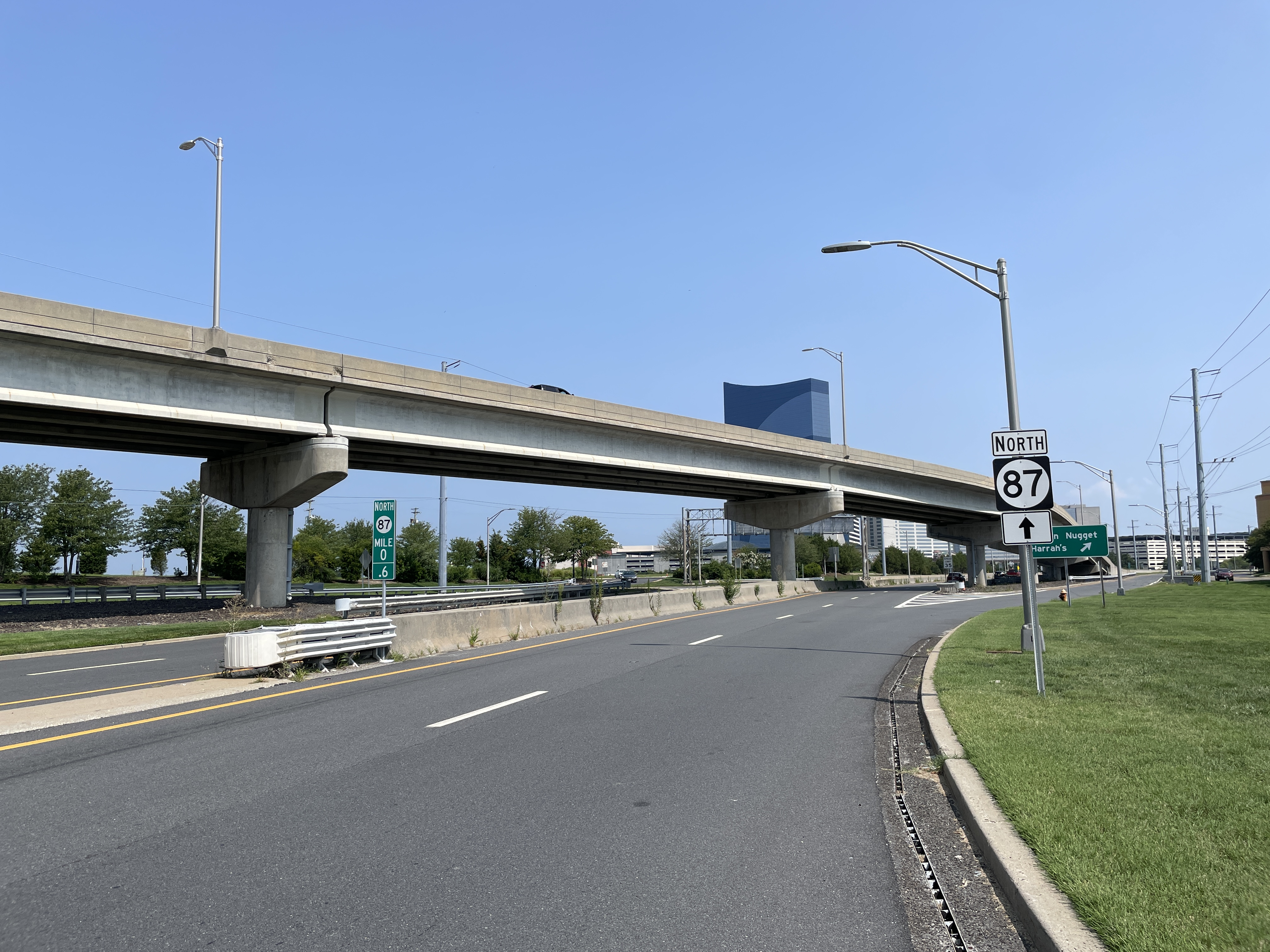
Route 87 northbound past Route 187 in Atlantic City

The route passes to the west of the Golden Nugget Atlantic City casino and comes to a ramp that provides access from northbound Route 87 to both the Golden Nugget Atlantic City and Harrah's Atlantic City casinos before passing under the northbound Atlantic City–Brigantine Connector again. Immediately after, the route has a ramp from the southbound direction that provides access to the connector and westbound US 30. The northbound Atlantic City–Brigantine Connector parallels Route 87 to the east as it turns northeast and comes to a right-in/right-out in the southbound direction that serves both Harrah's and Borgata. From here, the route passes to the southeast of Harrah's. The northbound Atlantic City–Brigantine Connector merges onto northbound Route 87 before the route comes to a ramp that provides access to the northbound direction of the route from Harrah's.

The highway enters the Brigantine Bridge across the Absecon Channel, and the northbound lanes cross over the city line into Brigantine at milepost 1.38 (2.22 km) along the bridge. The Atlantic City–Brigantine border continues through the center of the highway and enters Brigantine Island with an interchange for U-turns in both directions. Route 87 terminates after the interchange, and the highway continues as CR 638 for 3.91 miles (6.29 km), which ends at a dead end along the beachfront at the northern end of Brigantine Island.

== History ==
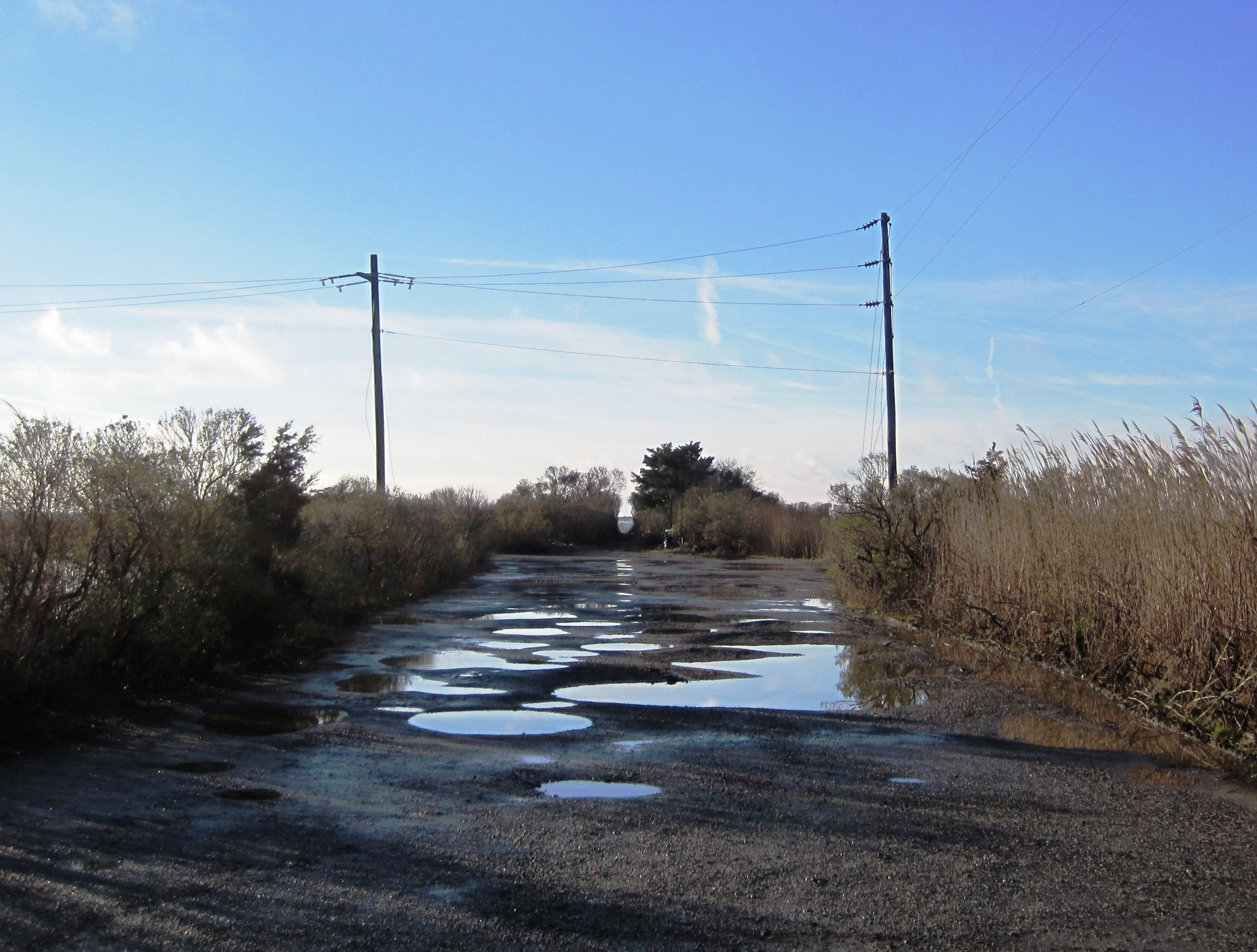
The southernmost end of Great Bay Boulevard, originally constructed by the state as Route S4A, in Little Egg Harbor Township

Route S56
- Location: Atlantic City–Brigantine
- Existed: 1945–1953

In 1927, Route S4A was proposed as a highway running from Route 4 (now US 9) in Tuckerton in Ocean County south to Little Beach. In 1929, this route was to continue south through Brigantine to Atlantic City, with the portion south of Little Beach to be built by Atlantic County. The state of New Jersey took over the proposed extension of Route S4A from Little Beach to Atlantic City in 1938. However, the portion of this route between Brigantine and the Atlantic/Ocean County line was never built, and the portion of road that existed in Ocean County, known as Great Bay Boulevard, was removed from the state highway system by 1941. In 1945, another route called Route S56, a spur of Route 56 (now US 30), was proposed to run north along Brigantine Boulevard (present-day Route 187 and Route 87) from Atlantic City to Brigantine. In the 1953 New Jersey state highway renumbering, Route 87 was designated as an unsigned route along the former alignment of Route S4A and the proposed Route S56 between US 30 in Atlantic City and Brigantine. Following the 1953 renumbering, the southern portion of Route 87 in Atlantic City split into two alignments, with one following Huron Avenue and the other following Brigantine Boulevard. Eventually, the alignment of Route 87 along Brigantine Boulevard between US 30 and Huron Avenue became Route 187. In 2001, the Atlantic City–Brigantine Connector was completed, linking Route 87, the casinos in the Marina District, and Brigantine with the Atlantic City Expressway.

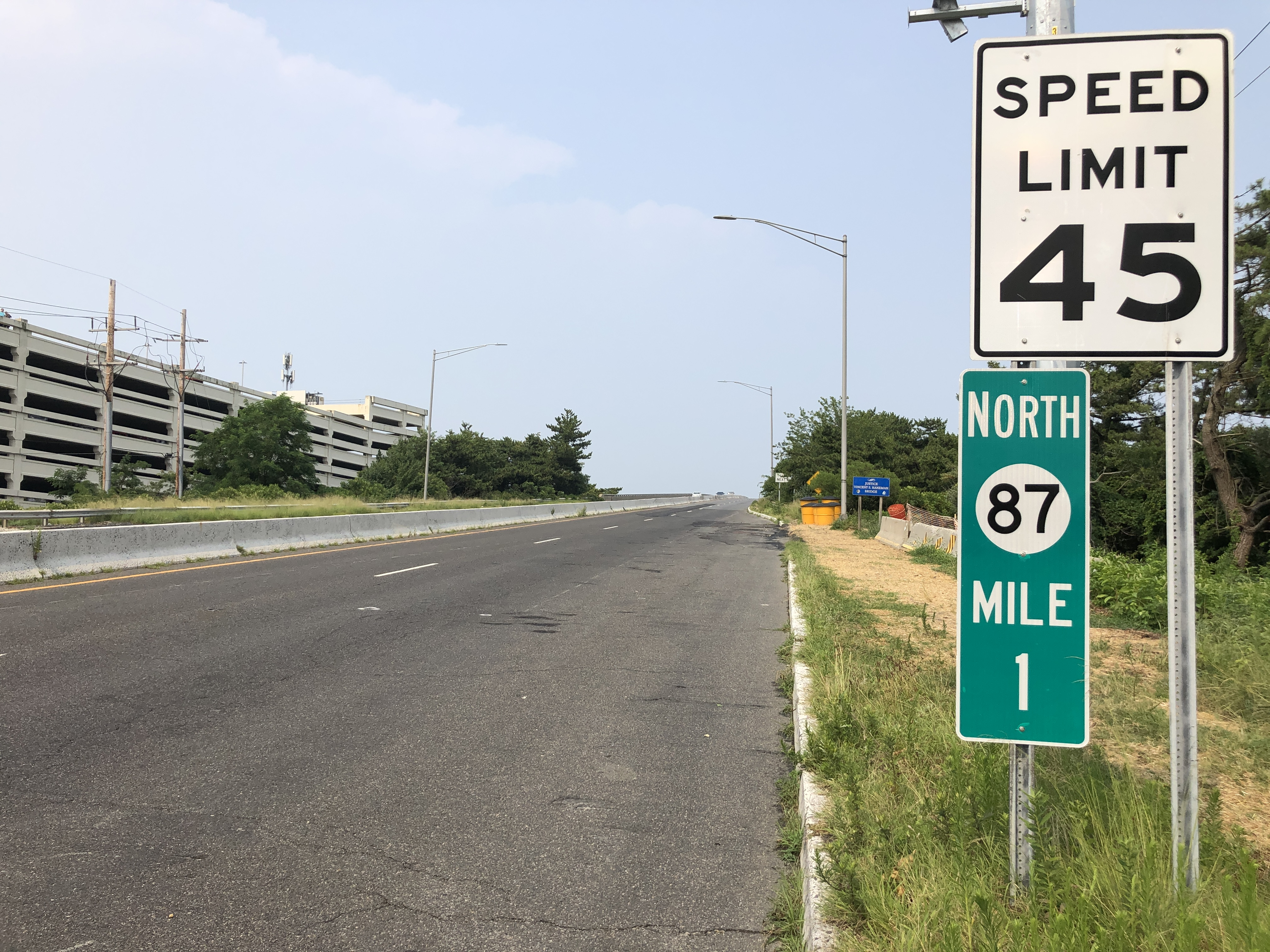
Route 87 northbound approaching the Justice Vincent S. Haneman Bridge over the Absecon Channel between Atlantic City and Brigantine

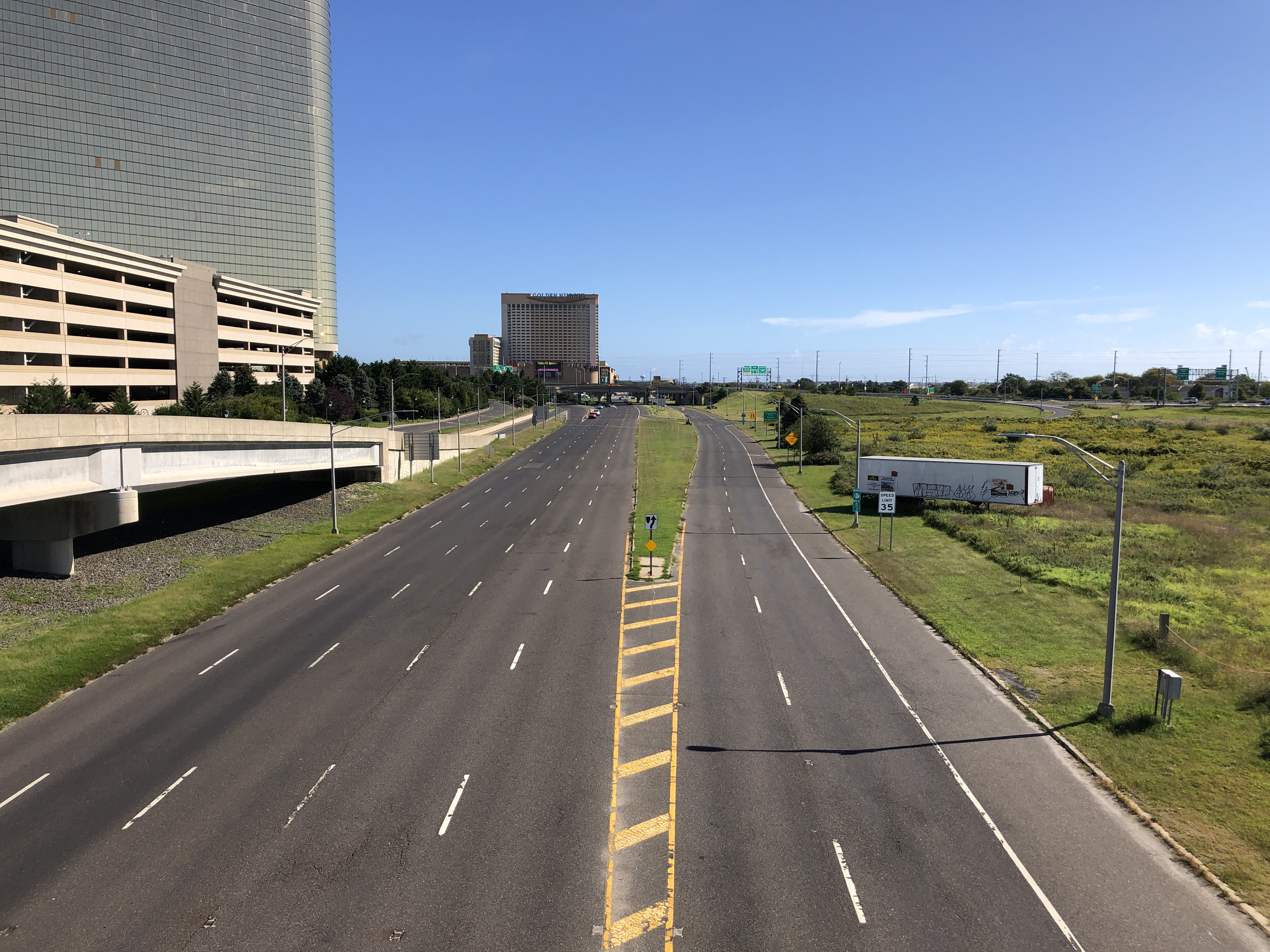
View northbound along Route 87 as it passes the Borgata

== Junction list ==
The entire route is in Atlantic County.

Location	mi	km	Destinations	Notes
Atlantic City	0.00	0.00	US 30 (Absecon Boulevard) to G.S. Parkway – Absecon	Signalized intersection; southern terminus; continues as Martin Luther King Jr. Boulevard
Atlantic City	0.13	0.21	To A.C. Expressway / G.S. Parkway – Convention Center, Midtown, Downbeach	Southbound exit only; signed as Exit D; access via A.C.–Brigantine Connector
Atlantic City	0.46	0.74	Borgata, MGM Tower	
Atlantic City	0.57	0.92	Route 187 south (Brigantine Boulevard) to US 30 east – Uptown, Hard Rock Beach	Signalized intersection; northern terminus of Route 187
Atlantic City	0.57	0.92	Huron Avenue – Farley Marina, Golden Nugget	Signalized intersection; northern terminus of Route 187
Atlantic City	0.63	1.01	Golden Nugget, Harrah's	Northbound exit only
Atlantic City	0.84	1.35	Harrah's, Borgata	Southbound exit and entrance; access via MGM Boulevard
Absecon Channel	1.22– 1.62	1.96– 2.61	Brigantine Bridge	
Atlantic City–Brigantine city line	1.63	2.62	U-turn	Interchange
Atlantic City–Brigantine city line	1.70	2.74	CR 638 north (Brigantine Boulevard)	Continuation beyond northern terminus
1.000 mi = 1.609 km; 1.000 km = 0.621 mi: Incomplete access; Route transition
