= Peters Beach =

Coordinates: 39.402°N 74.381°W

Peters Beach or Peter Beach is a former barrier island located on the Jersey Shore of the Atlantic Ocean in Atlantic County, New Jersey, United States. It is now a part of Brigantine Island.

== Geography ==
Peter Beach is on the southwestern portion of Brigantine Island, adjacent to St. George's Thoroughfare. It forms a section of Brigantine City.

Formerly a separate island, it was described in 1834 as,

on the Atlantic ocean, Galloway t-ship, Gloucester co., at the mouth of Absecon Inlet, and between it and Quarter Inlet.

Although Peters Beach measured about 1.5 mi (2.4 km) between inlets in 1828, by 1878 erosion had taken its toll, viz.,

Peters Beach is a small sandhill island, of only a few acres, lying inside of Brigantine Beach and near Absecon Inlet. Brigantine Beach has evidently made outside of it in the course of many years, and inclosed it, as Long Beach has more recently done with Short Beach. In Gordon's map, 1828, Peters Beach is represented as lying between Quarter's Inlet and Absecon Inlet, and in a line with Brigantine and Absecon Beaches.

By 1904, Quarters Inlet had taken on an "S" shape, curving in front of Peters Beach and separating it from Brigantine Island. Now known as Quarter Channel, it no longer connected directly with the ocean, but with Absecon Inlet. By 1940, Quarters Channel had closed up, completing the connection with Brigantine Island.
