= Absecon Island =

Island on the Jersey Shore of the Atlantic Ocean

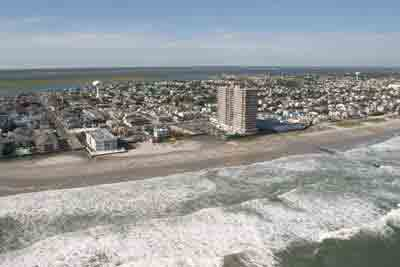
- Atlantic Ocean shoreline at Margate City, on Absecon Island
- Interactive map of Absecon Island
- Etymology: Lenape Absegami ("little water")

Geography
- Location: Atlantic Ocean
- Coordinates: 39°20′26″N 74°28′39″W
- Type: Barrier island
- Adjacent to: Absecon Inlet

Administration
- United States
- State: New Jersey
- County: Atlantic

Demographics
- Population: 53,917 (2020)

Absecon Island is a barrier island located on the South Jersey Shore of the Atlantic Ocean in Atlantic County, New Jersey, United States. On the island from north to south are the resort communities of Atlantic City, Ventnor City, Margate City, and Longport, with a total population among the four communities of 53,917 as of the 2020 United States census. The island ends at Absecon Inlet to the north and Great Egg Harbor Inlet to the south.

== Geography ==
A barrier island, Absecon Island extends between Absecon Inlet on the northeast and Great Egg Harbor Inlet to the southwest.

Absecon Island was described in 1834 as,

Absecum Beach, on the Atlantic Ocean; extends, eastwardly, from Great Egg Harbour Inlet, about 9 miles to Absecum Inlet; broken, however by a narrow inlet, near midway between its extremities.

An 1878 description of Absecon Island is, viz,

Absecon Beach lies between Absecon Inlet and Great Egg Harbor. It is about ten miles long, and partially wooded on its northeastern end. On this beach the famed "City by the Sea", Atlantic City, has been erected since 1853. At that time it was a wild jungle, with only two or three families residing there. Quite extensive salt works were at one time located near Absecon Inlet.

== History ==
Absecon's earliest European settlers were English who earned their living clamming and oystering. Land there was bought not for farming but for control of the waterways. The name Absecon came from the word "Absegami" or little water, named by the Native Americans living along Absecon Creek.

In 1695, Thomas Budd purchased 10,000 acres (40 km^{2}) of land in what later became Atlantic County. He paid 4 cents an acre ($9.88/km^{2}) for land on which Atlantic City now stands. It was called Further Island (further from Absecon) and later called Absecon Beach and finally became Atlantic City.

Jeremiah Leeds was the first permanent settler on Absecon Island in 1785. He came from Leeds Point to Absecon Island when it was a complete wilderness. He built a cabin of cedar logs and cleared a field where the Atlantic City Expressway now ends in Atlantic City. The block called Columbus Plaza was part of the Leeds farm. Most of the homes in Atlantic City until 1854 were built by descendants of Jeremiah Leeds. Jeremiah's son Chalkey S. Leeds became the first mayor of Atlantic City in 1854 and his youngest son, Robert, became the first postmaster of Atlantic City.

In 1819, Dr. Jonathan Pitney went to Absecon to set up his medical practice. His visits to Absecon Island convinced him that the island had the climate ideal for a health resort. He was instrumental in convincing the municipal authorities that a railroad to the beach would be beneficial. He has been called the "Father of Atlantic City".

The first beachwalk or "boardwalk" in Atlantic City was completed in 1870 by Simon Luchs Wescoat. Because of its success as a resort, a second railroad was built in 1877. Fifty-four miles of track was laid in a record time of 98 days.

== Beach reclamation ==
As a barrier island, the beaches of Absecon Island are continuously impacted by erosion, particularly nor'easters, hurricanes, and other coastal storms. The U.S. Army Corps of Engineers is undertaking a project to construct an approximate $63 million beach and dune system along the 8.1-mile oceanfront of Absecon Island.

== See also ==
- Brigantine Island
