= Atlantic City–Brigantine Connector =

Highway in Atlantic City, New Jersey, US

Atlantic City–Brigantine Connector
- Atlantic City Expressway Connector
- Atlantic City–Brigantine Connector highlighted in red; alternate routing per NJDOT highlighted in blue

Route information
- Auxiliary route of A.C. Expressway
- Maintained by SJTA
- Length: 2.37 mi (Note: Sources vary in the total route length from 2.2 to 2.6 miles (3.5 to 4.2 km); however, images from the New Jersey Department of Transportation's (NJDOT) road database show the connector terminating 0.07 miles (0.11 km) past milepost 2.3 (3.7 km). NJDOT alternatively measures the route length as 1.98 miles (3.19 km) from its southern terminus to its ramp intersection with US 30; this method disregards the northbound-only section of the connector.) (3.81 km)
- Existed: 2001–present
- Component highways: Route 446X (unsigned; entire route)
- NHS: Entire route

Major junctions
- South end: A.C. Expressway in Atlantic City
- US 30 in Atlantic City
- North end: Route 87 in Atlantic City

Location
- Country: United States
- State: New Jersey
- Counties: Atlantic

Highway system
- New Jersey State Highway Routes; Interstate; US; State; Scenic Byways
| ← Route 446 | 446X | → Route 495 |

The Atlantic City–Brigantine Connector, officially the Atlantic City Expressway Connector, (Note: Abbreviated as A.C.–Brigantine Connector or A.C. Expressway Connector; also known as the Atlantic City Connector or Brigantine Connector.) is a connector freeway in Atlantic City, New Jersey, United States. It is a 2.37-mile (3.81 km) extension of the Atlantic City Expressway, connecting it to New Jersey Route 87, which leads into Brigantine via the Marina district of Atlantic City. Locally, the freeway is known as "the Tunnel", due to the tunnel along its route that passes underneath the Westside neighborhood. The freeway is owned and operated by the South Jersey Transportation Authority (SJTA); it has an unsigned state highway designation of Route 446X.

Proposals for a similar connector road in Atlantic City date to 1964; planning began in 1995 after businessman Steve Wynn proposed a new casino hotel in the Marina district. The goals were to reduce traffic on Atlantic City streets and improve access to the Marina district and Brigantine. It was supported by Governor Christine Todd Whitman and Mayor Jim Whelan, but faced major opposition during its planning. Residents whose homes were to be destroyed for the tunnel construction fought the project, and competing casino owner Donald Trump filed lawsuits to prevent its construction.

Construction took almost three years and opened in July 2001 at a total cost of $330 million. Since its opening, the connector has served up to 30,000 vehicles daily, and affected the city's economy by bringing business to the casinos in the Marina district.

== Route description ==
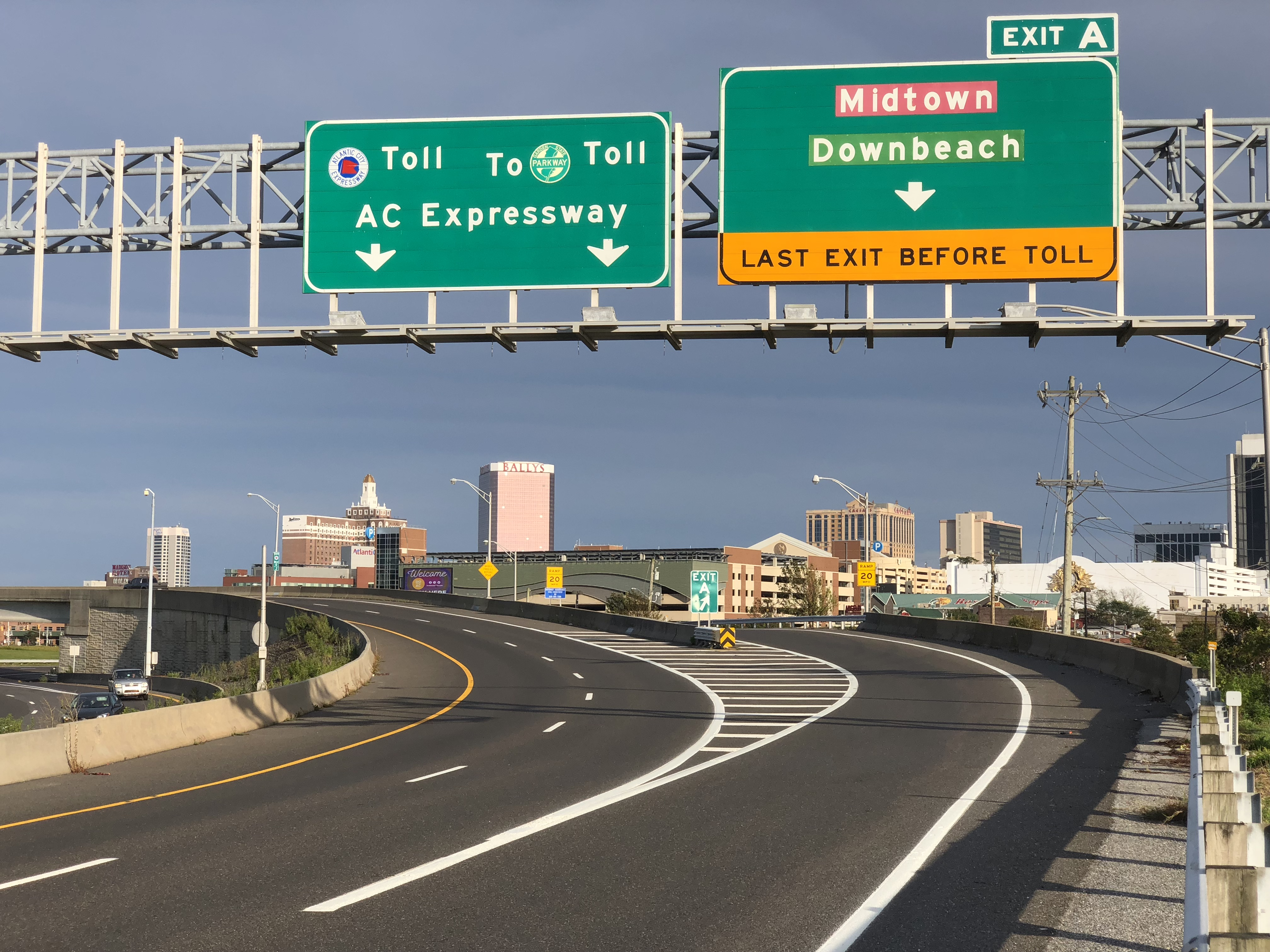
The connector's southern terminus near the Atlantic City Expressway and exit A

The Atlantic City–Brigantine Connector is a freeway located entirely within Atlantic City, New Jersey, and has a route length of 2.37 miles (3.81 km). It is a toll-free extension of the tolled Atlantic City Expressway (A.C. Expressway) and serves as a connector between the expressway and Route 87 near Brigantine. The connector averages two lanes per direction and has a posted speed limit of 35 mph (56 km/h). The northernmost 0.89 miles (1.43 km) serves northbound traffic only, whereas southbound traffic travels along the parallel Route 87. Exits along the route are assigned by letter from A to I. It is designated by the New Jersey Department of Transportation (NJDOT) as a state highway, unsigned Route 446X, which is part of the National Highway System. The freeway is owned and operated by the SJTA.

External videos
- Dashcam videos of the connector
- Connector northbound
- Connector southbound

The route begins near the eastern terminus of the A.C. Expressway with a southbound-only exit to the Midtown and Downbeach districts. It then turns north along the western shore of Atlantic City and comes to a grade crossing with NJ Transit's Atlantic City Line adjacent to the Beach Bridge and the Atlantic City Rail Terminal, followed by an interchange at Bacharach Boulevard. At 0.87 miles (1.40 km) along the route, the freeway enters a 1,957-foot (596 m) tunnel under Horace Bryant Park in the Westside neighborhood. North of the tunnel is a southbound on-ramp from Route 87, followed by an interchange with U.S. Route 30 (US 30) via Route 187. After the US 30 interchange, the freeway continues for northbound traffic only, with an exit that serves as a U-turn to the southbound connector, an exit to Borgata and MGM Tower, and an exit to the Farley Marina and Golden Nugget Atlantic City. The final exit ramp leads to Harrah's Atlantic City, after which the northbound connector terminates as it merges onto Route 87 northbound, which continues into Brigantine via the Brigantine Bridge.

== History ==
=== Initial proposals ===
The 44-mile (71 km) A.C. Expressway was built from 1962 to 1965, connecting the Philadelphia metropolitan area with the Jersey Shore resort city of Atlantic City. During construction in 1964, the Atlantic City Planning Board proposed the Route 30 Connector, a connector road linking the end of the expressway in Midtown Atlantic City with US 30. The purpose of the connector was to reduce traffic congestion and improve access to the Marina district and the neighboring city of Brigantine. Because of a lack of funds and environmental concerns about construction near the adjacent wetlands, the connector project remained dormant until 1990 when plans for the road were included in a report by the city's Transportation Executive Council. A 1991 study found the project was environmentally feasible, and a route was proposed with a one-mile (1.6 km) elevated highway over the wetlands. Construction costs were estimated at $80 million, but due to a continuing lack of funds and the complexity of constructing above the wetlands, the project was again postponed.

=== Planning ===
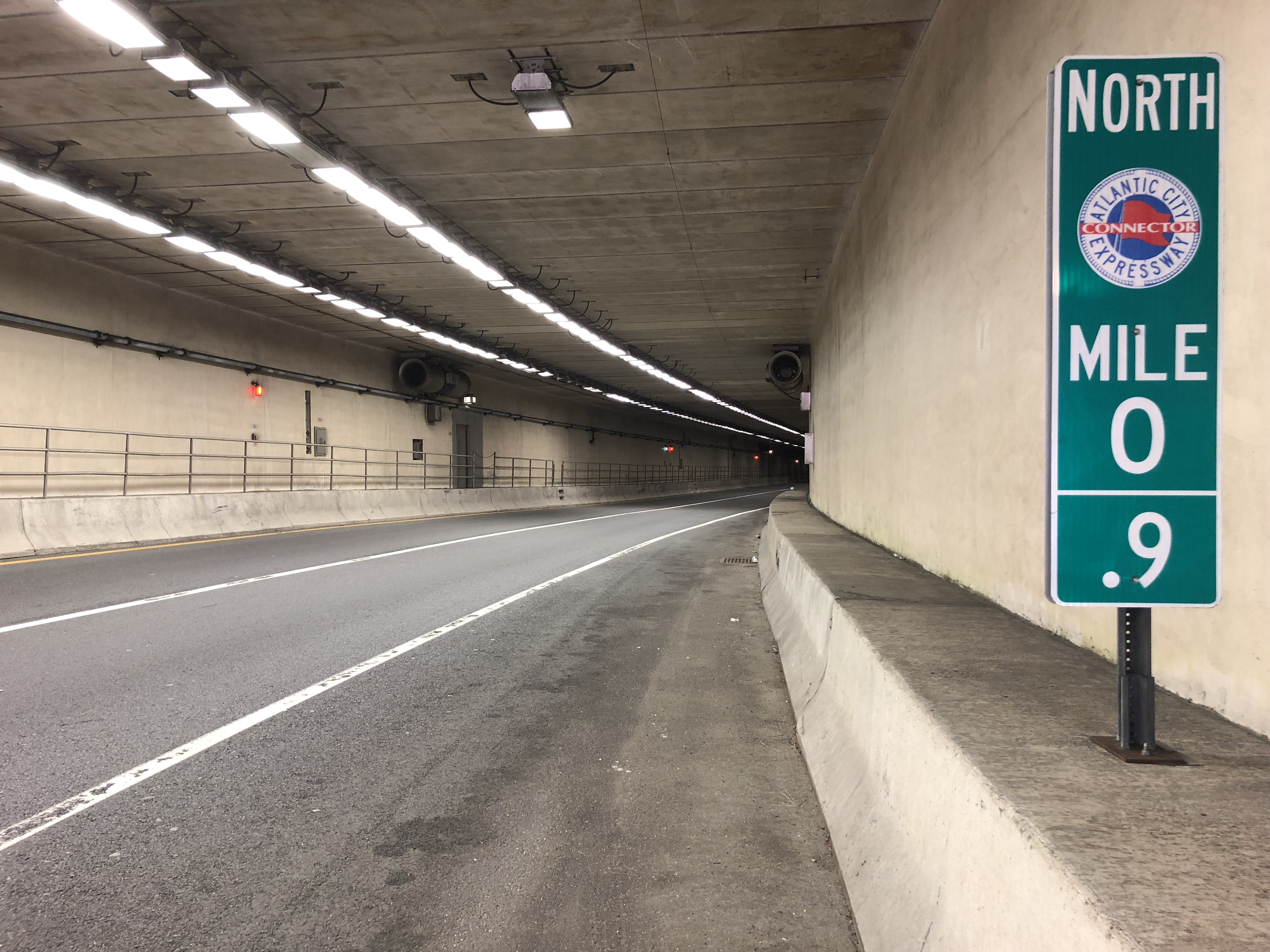
Construction of the tunnel under the Westside neighborhood required the demolition of nine homes.

Plans for the connector reemerged in 1995 following a proposal from real estate businessman and Mirage Resorts president Steve Wynn. The city of Atlantic City issued a request for proposals to developers interested in developing the H-Tract, a former landfill site in the Marina district. Wynn obtained the property from the city following his proposal to construct Le Jardin, a $1 billion casino hotel resort. He said he would only build if better road access was provided directly to the site, which prompted state officials to revive the connector plans.

Governor Christine Todd Whitman created a transportation task force in September 1995 to consider options. It studied 11 alternative routes, including elevated highways, tunnels, and improvements to existing streets. In March 1996, the task force determined that the best alternative was the Westside Bypass route, which included a highway along the western shore of the city with a tunnel under the Westside neighborhood. Whitman formally adopted the task force's recommendation in July 1996, which ensured that the alternative would be built.

The goal of the project was to improve the transportation network in Atlantic City, including evacuation route capacity, traffic flow along local streets, and access to the Atlantic City Convention Center, the Marina district, and Brigantine. It was expected to accommodate 14,000 to 17,000 vehicles per day. The tunnel was designed to have as little impact on the surrounding environment as possible; its design included both portals on opposite ends of the community, with landscaping added between the construction site and adjacent homes. Nine existing homes along Horace J. Bryant Jr. Drive would be demolished for the construction of the tunnel. Funding for the project, formally known as the Atlantic City–Brigantine Connector, was approved in January 1997. The total cost of the project was $330 million (equivalent to $614 million in 2025). To fund the project, Mirage Resorts paid $110 million, with the remainder coming from state funds from the SJTA ($60 million), the Transportation Trust Fund ($95 million), and the Casino Reinvestment Development Authority ($65 million).

=== Controversies ===
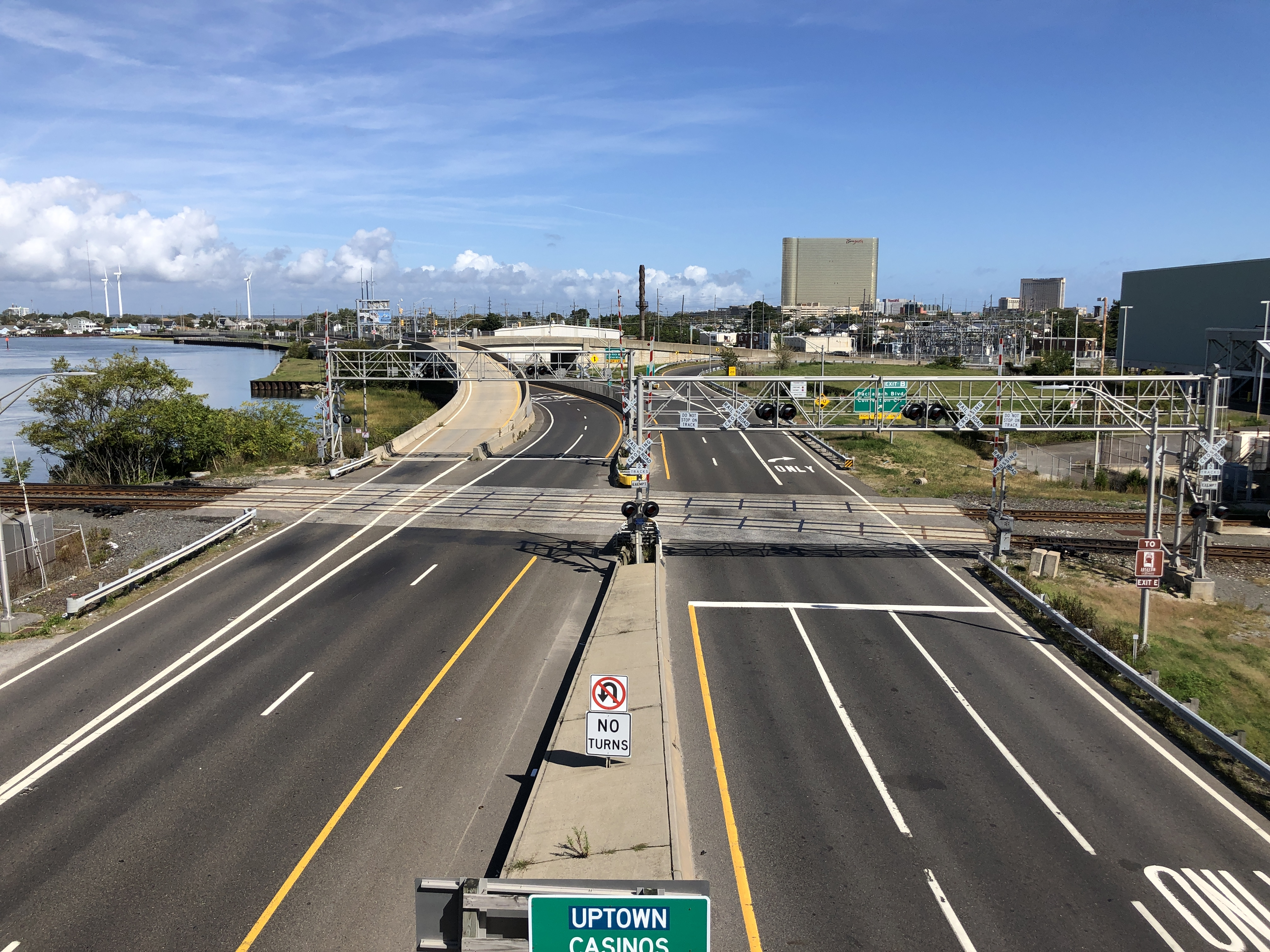
The connector includes a railroad grade crossing near the Atlantic City Rail Terminal, which was criticized for safety concerns.

The project was controversial, as tunnel construction would displace homes in the Westside neighborhood, and residents vowed to fight it. Its opponents described the project as an effort to destroy a community, while supporters claimed it was necessary to reduce traffic and create new jobs at the planned casino. Atlantic City Mayor Jim Whelan, a supporter, felt the project would benefit the city. Mirage offered each affected property owner on Horace J. Bryant Jr. Drive $200,000 for their homes, an offer five of the nine accepted. A group of 92 Westside homeowners filed a lawsuit against the company and the city claiming the tunnel construction would require the demolition of "their stable, black neighborhood" and create health concerns, thus violating their rights.

Donald Trump, the chairman of Trump Hotels & Casino Resorts at the time, was also opposed to the connector, and paid the Westside residents' legal bills. Knowing that Wynn's casino would not be built without the connector, Trump also filed lawsuits against the use of state funds for the project. According to Whelan, Trump "didn't want the competition" with his three existing Atlantic City casinos, including Trump Marina, next to the site of Wynn's future casino at the H-Tract. Trump criticized the connector as a state-funded "private driveway" to Wynn's casino, and denounced the funding as "corporate welfare" that unfairly favored Mirage, an out-of-state company, over those that had previously made business investments in the city. He claimed that the tunnel would have "immense environmental impacts", and urged the state's Department of Environmental Protection to deny construction permits. Mirage and Wynn retaliated by filing an antitrust lawsuit against Trump Hotels alleging that the company's only goal was to prevent the Mirage resort from being built. The feud between Trump and Wynn over the connector was later the subject of the 2012 book The War at the Shore: Donald Trump, Steve Wynn, and the Epic Battle to Save Atlantic City, by former Mirage director Richard "Skip" Bronson.

According to the Las Vegas Sun, "more than a dozen" lawsuits were filed over the connector project. The lawsuit by the Westside homeowners was eventually dismissed by a federal judge in February 1998. Trump's legal battles against the project lasted four years; he dropped them in February 2001 in exchange for a settlement that would include a new ramp to provide access from the future H-Tract casino to Trump Marina. Trump agreed to pay half the ramp's $12 million cost. A group of New Jersey mayors who also opposed the project filed suit to block "an inappropriate use of state funds". Their lawsuit was also dismissed; the court found the construction of the connector necessary whether the casino was built or not.

Aside from the tunnel, the project was criticized for including a railroad grade crossing on a freeway. The design was opposed by the Federal Railroad Administration and rail advocacy groups for safety concerns; however, the SJTA said the design was a compromise to allow for a full interchange at Bacharach Boulevard and provide access to the convention center.

=== Construction ===
Construction bids for the design–build contract of the Atlantic City–Brigantine Connector were submitted to the SJTA in July 1997. The contract was awarded to the joint venture of Yonkers Contracting Company and Granite Construction who served as the general contractors. At the time of inception, the connector was the largest design–build project performed by the State of New Jersey. Permits were granted in October 1998, and the groundbreaking ceremony took place on November 4. Completion was originally scheduled for May 2001.

Excavation of the tunnel began in May 1999; the cut and cover method was used. The nine homes were demolished and a 2,900-foot (880 m) trench was dug down to 35 feet (11 m) deep. A total 160,000 cubic yards (120,000 m^{3}) of dirt were removed, most of which was reused to construct ramps at other sites on the connector. For the tunnel walls, 100,000 cubic yards (76,000 m^{3}) of reinforced concrete were poured, and a five-foot-thick (1.5 m) concrete roof was constructed on top of the tunnel where the homes once stood; the site was later turned into a neighborhood park. Since the tunnel runs adjacent to the Penrose Canal, groundwater was present five feet (1.5 m) below the bottom of the trench, requiring a dewatering process to complete the construction. Technology was installed to monitor traffic flow and control the tunnel ventilation, which automatically triggers jet fans if carbon monoxide levels become too high. The tunnel is 14.5 feet (4.4 m) high, but is restricted to vehicles with a maximum clearance of 14 feet (4.3 m).

In addition to the tunnel, the project included the construction of 16 bridges, 15 ramps, and 23 retaining walls, plus landscaping, drainage, and the installation of variable-message signs. Workers also relocated public utility infrastructure, shifted 2,000 feet (610 m) of railroad tracks, rebuilt 3,680 feet (1,120 m) of bulkhead, and demolished a pumping station, a warehouse, and portions of a power station. A promenade at Trump Marina was leveled to make way for new ramps, and 37 ornamental lampposts were dismantled and later shipped to the nearby Tuckerton Seaport, which opened in 2000. To avoid disruptions in the neighborhood, construction materials were delivered by barge, and construction vehicles did not travel along any local streets.

During construction, Wynn sold Mirage Resorts to MGM Grand Inc. in 2000, forming the MGM Mirage company. Wynn's plans for his Atlantic City casino resort were cancelled. MGM Mirage took over the H-Tract site and renamed it Renaissance Pointe, and developed plans for Borgata Hotel Casino & Spa, which opened in 2003 after three years of construction.

=== Opening ===
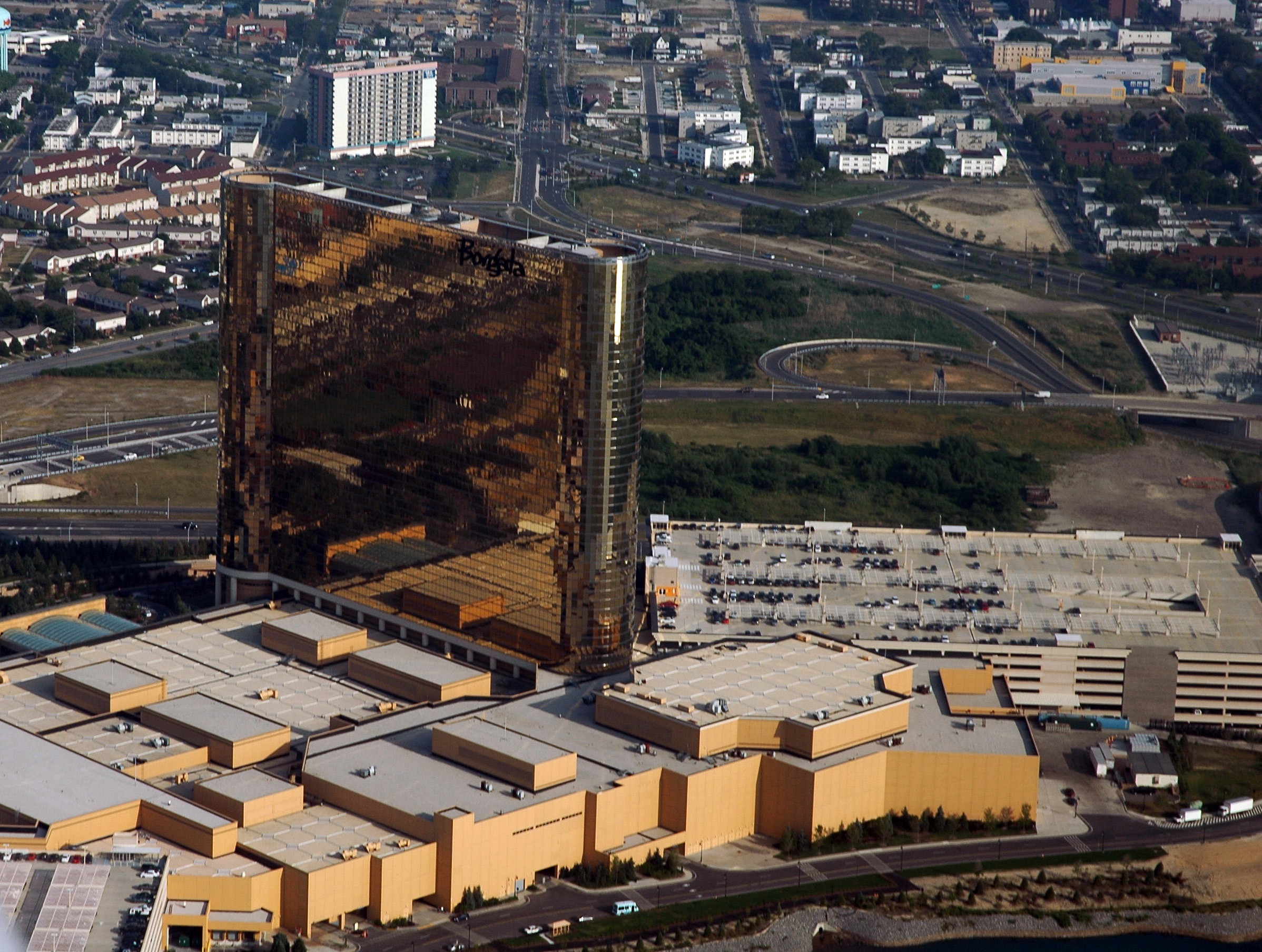
The opening of the connector helped establish Borgata, which opened in 2003. The connector's ramps are visible in the background.

A shortage of materials and delivery issues in late 2000 delayed the connector's opening from May to July 2001. The grand opening ceremony took place on July 27, with festivities including a pedestrian tunnel walk. The connector was expected to open to traffic that evening, but due to last-minute malfunctions with the tunnel's emergency communication system, it did not open to vehicles until July 31. Upon opening, the freeway was formally named the Atlantic City Expressway Connector, although it is called "the Tunnel" by locals. The ramp across Huron Avenue (Route 87) connecting Borgata to Trump Marina opened in 2003, which marked the completion of the connector project.

Once the connector opened, travel times between the Midtown and the Marina districts fell from fifteen minutes to four. Initial traffic volume was lower than expected; the connector served only 11,000 to 12,000 vehicles per day during its first several months, which was attributed to a decline in travel following the September 11 terrorist attacks. However, traffic increased the following year, and the connector served up to 20,000 vehicles daily by July 2002, significantly higher than the original projections. After the opening of Borgata in 2003, annual traffic volume increased by 25 percent that year, serving 30,000 vehicles daily. Whelan said "the impact of the [connector] project is undeniable" in improving traffic flow in the city and access to Brigantine. The connector tunnel was used by 24,590 vehicles daily in 2013, including 1,229 trucks, and the US 30 ramp was used by 2,710 vehicles daily in 2023.

The connector also affected the city's economy and casino industry. Whelan credited the project for bringing Borgata, which has since become the city's top-grossing casino. Joe Kelly, executive director of the Greater Atlantic City Chamber of Commerce, said "the Connector has been vitally important to furthering Atlantic City's economic development objectives" by improving access to the Marina district and making it more "economically viable". State records from 2016 showed that the three casinos in the Marina district had an average annual gross revenue of $134 million, compared to $70 million for the casinos along the Atlantic City Boardwalk. Transportation analyst and former SJTA executive Anthony Marino cited the connector's ease of access to the Marina district casinos as a factor in their success and a challenge for boardwalk casinos; Whelan said it forced boardwalk casinos to reevaluate their business models.

The tunnel was used as a filming location in 2018 for the TV series Succession; the series portrayed the location as the Brooklyn–Battery Tunnel in New York City.

== Exit list ==
The entire route is in Atlantic City, Atlantic County.

| mi | km | Exit | Destinations | Notes |
|---|---|---|---|---|
| 0.00 | 0.00 | – | A.C. Expressway west to G.S. Parkway | Southern terminus; exit 1 on the A.C. Expressway |
| 0.31 | 0.50 | A | Midtown, Downbeach | Southbound exit and northbound left entrance; access via Mississippi Avenue |
| 0.55 | 0.89 | B | Bacharach Boulevard – Convention Center | |
| 0.87– 1.24 | 1.40– 2.00 | Tunnel below Horace Bryant Park | | |
| 1.48 | 2.38 | E | US 30 – Uptown, Hard Rock Beach, Resorts, Ocean Beach | Northbound left exit; northbound and southbound entrance; northern terminus of southbound lanes; ramp intersects with Route 187 (Brigantine Boulevard) |
| 1.66 | 2.67 | F | To A.C. Expressway west – Convention Center, Midtown, Downbeach | Northbound exit only; U-turn ramp to southbound connector |
| 1.77 | 2.85 | H | Borgata, MGM Tower | Northbound left exit only |
| 1.83 | 2.95 | G | Farley Marina, Golden Nugget | Northbound exit only; access via Route 87 (Huron Avenue) |
| 2.33 | 3.75 | I | Harrah's | Northbound exit only |
| 2.37 | 3.81 | – | Route 87 north (Brigantine Boulevard) – Brigantine | Northbound exit only; northern terminus |
1.000 mi = 1.609 km; 1.000 km = 0.621 mi: Incomplete access; Tolled
