= USS Absecon =

Two ships of the United States Navy have been named Absecon, after Absecon Inlet, located north of Atlantic City, New Jersey:

- USS Absecon (ID-3131) was a single-screw, steel-hulled freighter built in 1918, which saw less than one month of non-commissioned service in October–November 1918
- USS Absecon (AVP-23) was a Barnegat-class seaplane tender in commission as a catapult training ship from 1943 to 1947

== See also ==
- USCGC Absecon (WAVP-374), later WHEC-374
