= Brigantine Bridge =

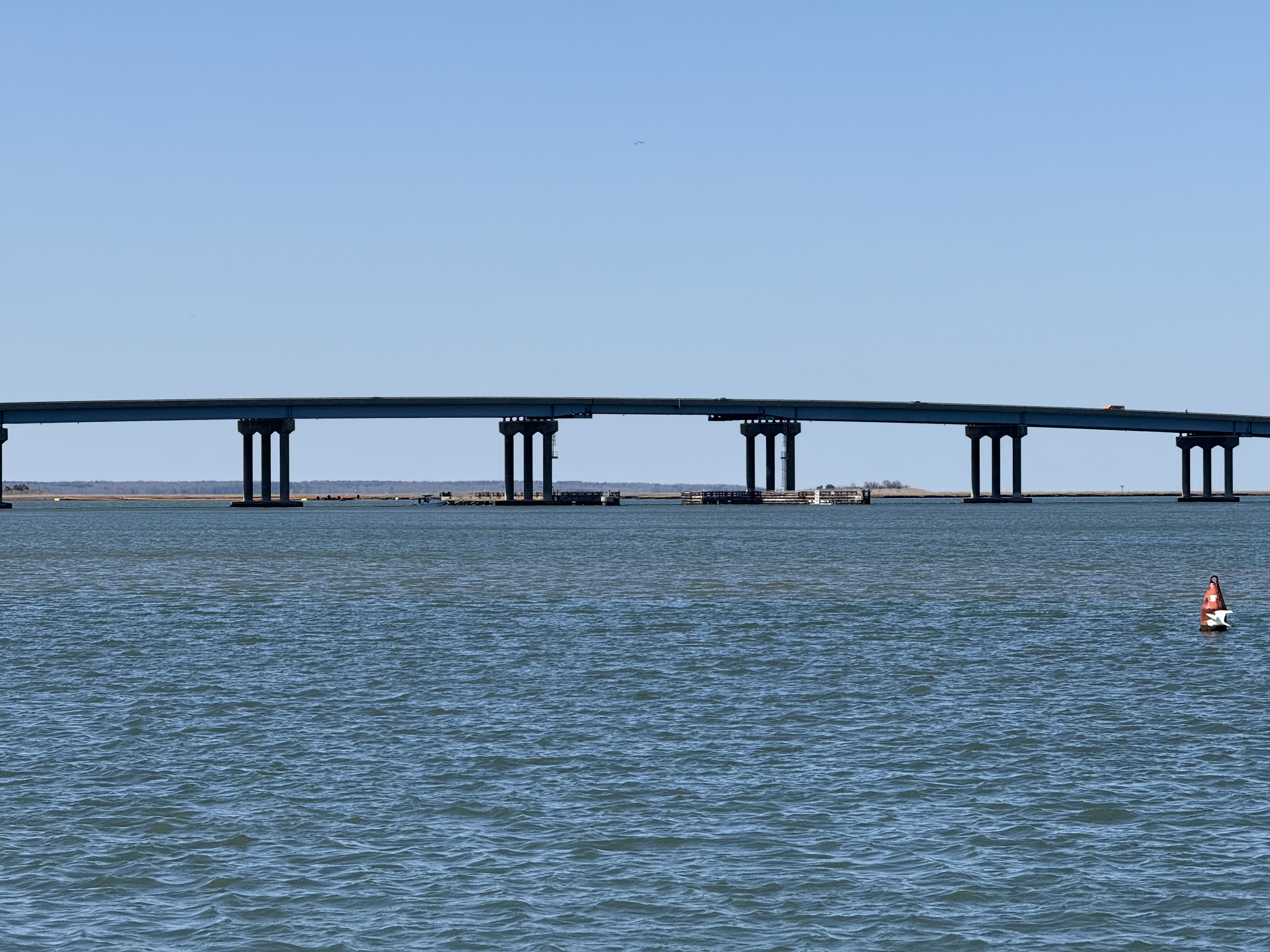
- View of the bridge from Gardners Pointe in Atlantic City, April 2025
- Coordinates: 39°23′07″N 74°25′19″W
- Carries: New Jersey Route 87
- Crosses: Absecon Inlet
- Locale: Atlantic City & Brigantine, New Jersey
- Maintained by: New Jersey Department of Transportation
- ID number: 0115150

Characteristics
- Design: Stringer
- Material: Steel/concrete
- Total length: 2,148 ft (655 m)
- Clearance below: 60 ft (18 m)

History
- Opened: 1924; 1938; 1972

The Brigantine Bridge is a vehicular bridge over Absecon Inlet in Atlantic County, New Jersey. It is located just west of the Atlantic Ocean in Atlantic City and the resort community of Brigantine, providing the only road access to Brigantine Island. It is owned and operated by the New Jersey Department of Transportation (NJDOT). The bridge carries New Jersey Route 87, which then becomes County Route 638 (Brigantine Boulevard) at its northern end. At its southern end it connects with the Atlantic City–Brigantine Connector.

== History ==
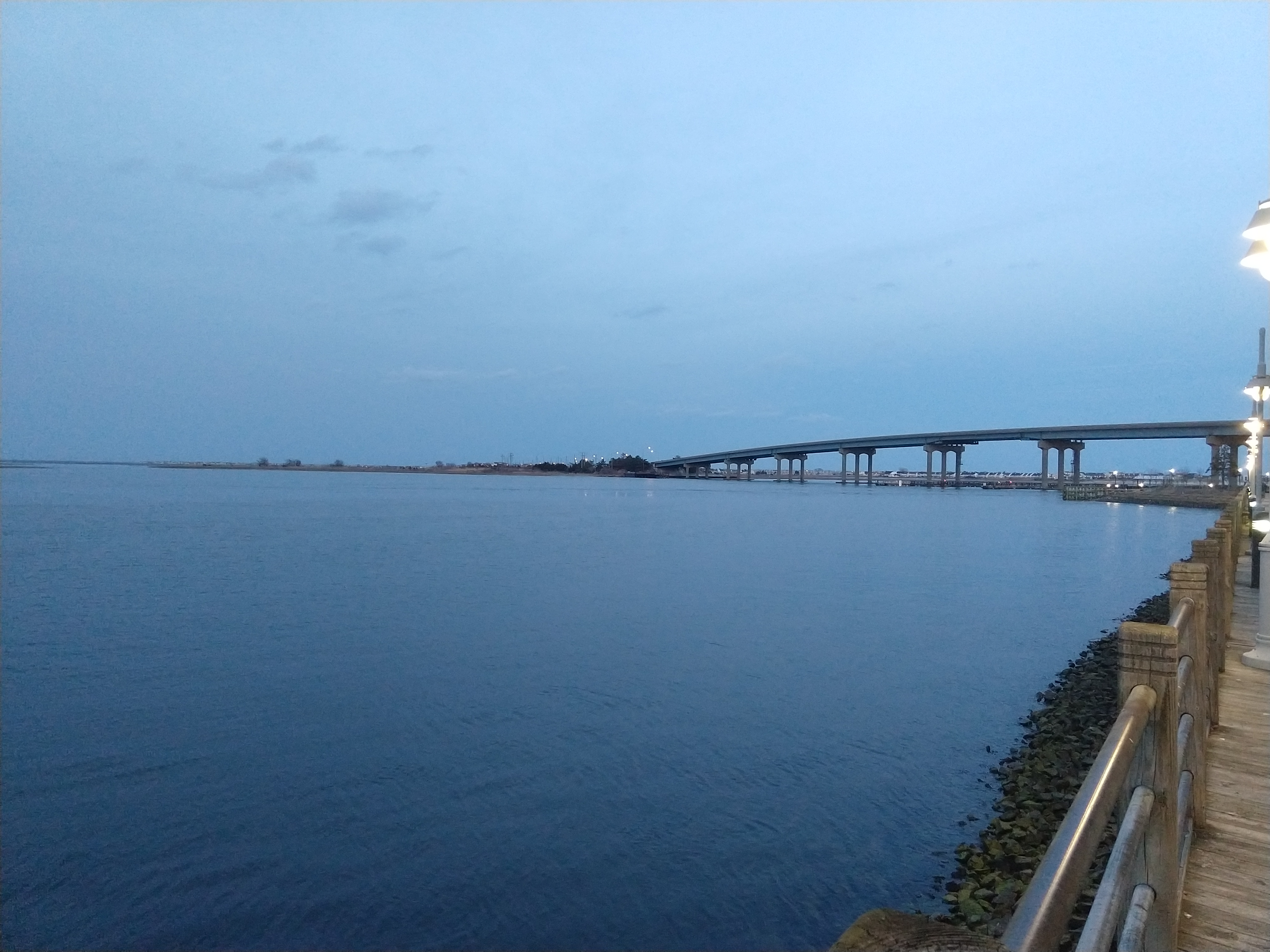
View of the bridge from the Atlantic City side, April 2018

The original bridge was built in 1924, at the cost of $1,000,000.00 and operated as a toll bridge, but was purchased by the county in 1925 and made a free span. It was lost in the Hurricane of 1938. Its replacement was also destroyed, in 1944.

Today's bridge was built in 1972. The steel-stringer bridge is 2,148 ft (655 m) long and was partially rehabilitated in 2007.

The bridges have been locally known as the Brigantine Causeway, the Absecon Inlet Bridge, the Brigantine Boulevard Bridge and the Route 87 bridge. The 1972 bridge is designated as the Vincent S. Haneman Memorial Bridge, in honor of Vincent S. Haneman, an Associate Justice of the New Jersey Supreme Court from 1960 to 1971 who was a resident of Brigantine.
