= USS Absecon (ID-3131) =

Cargo ship of the United States Navy

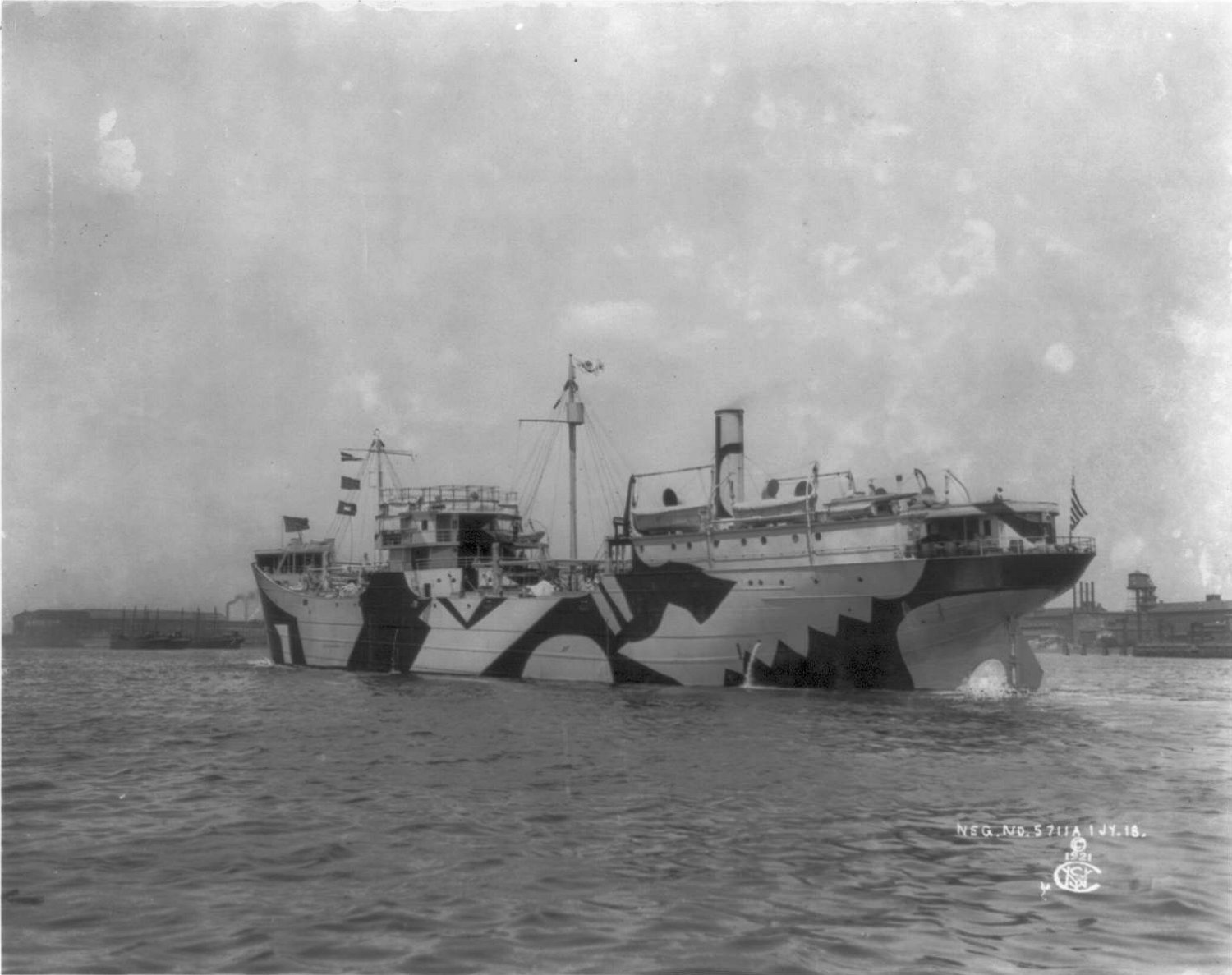
- USS Absecon (ID-3131) On trial trip in Delaware Bay, 1 July 1918.

History

United States
- Name: USS Absecon
- Namesake: Absecon Inlet in New Jersey
- Builder: New York Shipbuilding Company, Camden, New Jersey
- Laid down: 2 October 1917
- Launched: 23 March 1918
- Completed: 1918
- Commissioned: Never
- In service: In non-commissioned status on 12 October 1918
- Out of service: 5 November 1918
- Renamed: Acquired in 1928 by the Isthmian Line and renamed James Ellwood Jones; Renamed T. J. Sheridan in 1951; Acquired in 1960 by the Coyle Line and renamed DeBardeleben Marine II
- Reclassified: Converted to a barge in 1953
- Honors and awards: World War I Victory Medal with Armed Guard Clasp
- Fate: Scrapped 1962

General characteristics
- Class & type: Tuckahoe-class collier
- Displacement: 5,548 long tons (5,637 t)
- Length: 333 ft (101 m)
- Beam: 49 ft (15 m)
- Draft: 22 ft (6.7 m)
- Propulsion: One 1,800ihp steam engine, one shaft
- Speed: 10.5 kn (12.1 mph)
- Armament: Armed, but type of armament unknown

The first USS Absecon (ID-3131) was a freighter that operated in the United States Navy in 1918. She was the first U.S. Navy ship to be named for Absecon Inlet, a small inlet north of Atlantic City, New Jersey.

On 17 June 1918, officers of the U.S. Navy's 4th Naval District inspected Absecon, a single-screw, steel-hulled freighter built in 1918 by the New York Shipbuilding Company in Camden, New Jersey. Although the Navy gave the ship Identification Number (Id. No.) 3131, as it did with most commercial cargo ships and tankers commissioned into U.S. Navy service for use in World War I, the United States Government never took possession of the ship. However, she was armed, and a Navy armed guard crew was placed on board the ship.

Absecon earned the World War I Victory Medal with Armed Guard Clasp for service between 12 October 1918 and 5 November 1918. She then left naval service.
