= State highways in New Jersey =

Highway system of New Jersey

- Standard route signage in New Jersey
- State highways highlighted in red

Highway names
- Interstates: Interstate X (I-X)
- US Highways: U.S. Route X (US X)
- State: Route X

System links
- New Jersey State Highway Routes; Interstate; US; State; Scenic Byways

In the U.S. state of New Jersey, the New Jersey Department of Transportation (NJDOT) maintains a system of state highways. Every significant section of roadway maintained by the state is assigned a number, officially State Highway Route X. Interstate Highways and U.S. Highways are included in the system. State Routes are signed with the circular highway shield.

== Numbering and other details ==
Major routes are typically assigned one- or two-digit numbers, except where the numbers were chosen to match an adjacent state. Most numbers from 1 to 50 follow a general geographic pattern assigned in 1927 (details below), but later additions are more haphazard. The only suffixed routes other than U.S. Route 9W are short unmarked connections such as Route 76C, an elongated ramp to Interstate 76. The only special state route is Route 33 Business; U.S. Route 1 Business and U.S. Route 1-9 Truck are also present.

A statewide system of major county highways is numbered by the NJDOT in the 500–599 range; these are known as 500 Series County Routes. All counties but two—Bergen and Monmouth—number their other county routes beginning at 600. County routes in Bergen County range from 2 to 134; those in Monmouth County range from 1 to 57. Ocean County also has a system of minor county routes with numbers ranging from 3 to 111 in addition to those beginning with 600.

== History ==
The initial system of state highways was legislated in 1916, and by 1917 the state began to take over roads from the counties. By 1922, the routes were marked. U.S. Route numbers were added to some of the main routes in 1927.

Cutout state route marker used prior to 1953

After a failed renumbering in 1926, a completely new numbering was instituted in 1927, with only four sections of pre-1927 routes remaining as their old numbers suffixed with N - Route 4N, Route 5N, Route 8N and Route 18N. The new numbers followed a general geographical pattern from north to south - 1–12 in northern New Jersey, 21-28 roughly radiating from Newark, 29-37 from Trenton, 38-47 from Camden, and 48–50 in southern New Jersey. Every state highway, even those forming parts of U.S. Routes, was assigned a number. Some short routes were assigned prefixes of S; for instance, Route S26 was a spur of Route 26 south of New Brunswick. One prefixed and suffixed route - Route S4A - was also defined as a second spur of Route 4. As the system grew, some numbers beyond 50 were used, but most new routes received prefixed or suffixed labels.

1956 state route marker

On January 1, 1953, the second renumbering was implemented. This was not a complete renumbering; instead, the only renumbered routes were those that violated a few guidelines — primarily long concurrencies, especially with U.S. Routes; duplication of numbers with U.S. routes; suffixed routes; and number changes across state borders. Some routes were shortened to remove concurrencies, while others, like Route 25, completely disappeared. Numbers from 53 to 93 were assigned to renumbered routes, while shorter ones received numbers from 152 to 165. The two planned toll roads — the Garden State Parkway and New Jersey Turnpike - received only those names; they had been numbered 4 Parkway and 100.

The majority of new numbers assigned since the 1953 renumbering have been from 166 to 185, with some short routes instead receiving numbers based on their parents (for instance, an old section of U.S. Route 9 became Route 109). Minimal disruption was caused by the assignment of Interstate Highway numbers in the late 1950s. In the 1990s, the majority of special U.S. Highways were renumbered as state routes.

== Parkways and turnpikes ==
- Atlantic City Expressway (unsigned Route 446)
- Garden State Parkway (unsigned Route 444)
- Palisades Interstate Parkway (unsigned Route 445)
- New Jersey Turnpike (Northern section part of I-95 and southern section unsigned Route 700)
- Pearl Harbor Memorial Turnpike Extension (southernmost portion of I-95)

=== Connector roads ===
- Garden State Parkway exit 105 (unsigned Route 444S)
- Garden State Parkway exit 117 (unsigned Route 444R)
- Atlantic City–Brigantine Connector (unsigned Route 446X)

== See also ==
- List of Interstate Highways in New Jersey
- List of U.S. Routes in New Jersey
- List of state highways in New Jersey
- County routes in New Jersey
