= South Jersey Transportation Authority =

Transportation agency in New Jersey

Agency overview
- Formed: 1991
- Preceding agencies: New Jersey Expressway Authority; Atlantic County Transportation Authority
- Jurisdiction: South Jersey
- Headquarters: Mile Marker, 20 Atlantic City Expy, Hammonton, New Jersey address, 08037, U.S.
- Website: www.sjta.com

The South Jersey Transportation Authority (SJTA) is a quasi-private agency created by the New Jersey Legislature in 1991 to manage transportation-related services in the six southern New Jersey counties: Atlantic, Camden, Cape May, Cumberland, Gloucester, and Salem.

Its headquarters are on the property of the Frank S. Farley Service Plaza in Hamilton Township, Atlantic County, with a Hammonton postal address.

The South Jersey Transportation Authority should not be confused with the South Jersey Transportation Planning Organization, one of three metropolitan planning organizations in New Jersey.

== Overview ==
The Authority, successor to the New Jersey Expressway Authority and the Atlantic County Transportation Authority (ACTA), is responsible for coordinating South Jersey's transportation system, including highways, airports and other transportation needs. The Authority's transportation network includes public highways, including the Atlantic City Expressway, and transportation projects, such as the Atlantic City International Airport; parking facilities and functions once performed by ACTA; other public transportation facilities, and related economic development facilities in South Jersey.

The Atlantic City Expressway, a limited-access toll road, 47 miles (76 km) long, extends from approximately 10 miles (16 km) east of Philadelphia, to Atlantic City, and through the Atlantic City–Brigantine Connector to Brigantine Island. Thirteen interchanges provide access to arterial routes, including the Garden State Parkway, and seven toll barriers control the collection of toll revenues.

Atlantic City International Airport covers approximately 5,000 acres (20 km^{2}) and is located near the Delilah Road exit (Interchange 9 of the Atlantic City Expressway) approximately 10 miles (16 km) northwest of Atlantic City. Aviation services include scheduled flights and charter service as well as ground handling of aircraft, fueling, aircraft maintenance, parking, registration and collection of landing and parking fees through fixed-base operators.

South Jersey Transportation Authority operates shuttle buses and vans to worksites in Burlington, Camden and Gloucester counties.

== Shuttle routes ==
Shuttle name	Terminals		Places served	Notes	Reference
Egg Harbor City Rail Station	Egg Harbor City station	Atlantic City International Airport	Stockton University, FAA Technical Center	Service Terminated October 1, 2024	
English Creek-Tilton Road Community Shuttle	English Creek Avenue and West Jersey Avenue	Shore Road and Golfview Drive	English Creek Avenue, Absecon Avenue, Tilton Road, Harbor Square, Oak Tree Plaza, Tilton Road, Northfield	Operates Monday-Saturday	
Pureland East West Community Shuttle	Avandale Park and Ride	Pureland Industrial Complex	U.S. Route 322, Williamstown, Glassboro, Mullica Hill, Kings Highway	Operates Monday-Friday	
Pureland North South Community Shuttle	Walter Rand Transportation Center	Pureland Industrial Complex	Camden, Broadway, Westville, Woodbury, Route 45, East Greenwich	Operates Monday-Friday	
Route 54/40 Community Shuttle	Hammonton Walmart	U.S. Route 40 and Main Avenue	Hammonton ShopRite, Hammonton, Hammonton station, Route 54, Collings Lakes, Newtonville, Buena, Landisville, U.S. Route 40, Richland	Operates Monday-Friday	
Pennsauken Light Rail Shuttle	Pennsauken–Route 73 station	Pennsauken–Route 73 station	Pennsauken Industrial Park	Operates Monday-Friday, loop route	
