= Brigantine Island =

Island in Atlantic County, New Jersey, United States

Coordinates: 39.4069°N 74.3671°W

Brigantine Island (also known as Brigantine Beach Island) is an island off the Atlantic Ocean coast of New Jersey, located northeast of Atlantic City. It is 6 miles (9.7 km) long. The resort community of Brigantine is located on the island.

The island is accessible via Route 87, which terminates at the end of the Brigantine Bridge, after crossing the Absecon Inlet. After crossing the channel, the road's designation changes to County Route 638 (Brigantine Boulevard).

The Brigantine Lighthouse is a lighthouse on Brigantine Island. It was built in 1926 by the Island Development Real Estate Company to attract people to Brigantine Island and not as an operating lighthouse, somewhat like Lucy the Elephant to the south.

== Geography ==
Brigantine Island is a barrier island along the Atlantic Ocean between Brigantine Inlet on the northeast, and Absecon Inlet on the southwest. The former Quarters Inlet originally separated Brigantine Island from Peters Beach on the southwest, but through sand deposition Brigantine Island has extended its length and enclosed Peters Beach; Quarters Inlet is now closed.

Brigantine Island was described in 1834 as,

Brigantine Beach, on the Atlantic ocean, Galloway t-ship, Gloucester co., extends from Quarter’s Inlet, eastwardly, to Old Brigantine Inlet, about 6 miles, by about a half a mile in width. Several salt works have been established here.

In 1878 it was described,

Brigantine Beach, between the inlet of that name and Absecon Inlet, is about eight miles long. This is also a low, sandy, barren island. Two hotels for summer boarders are found here, Holdzkom's and Smith's, and a number of private residences have been erected on its southern part since the popular growth of Atlantic City.

By 1904, Quarters Inlet had taken on an "S" shape, curving in front of Peters Beach and separating it from Brigantine Island. By then known as Quarter Channel, it no longer connected directly with the ocean, but with Absecon Inlet. By 1940, Quarters Channel had closed up, completing the connection with Brigantine Island.

== See also ==
- Peters Beach
