= Absecon Inlet =

Inlet north of Atlantic City, New Jersey

Coordinates: 39°22′33″N 74°24′47″W

Absecon Inlet is a narrow strait on the southeastern coast of New Jersey, United States.

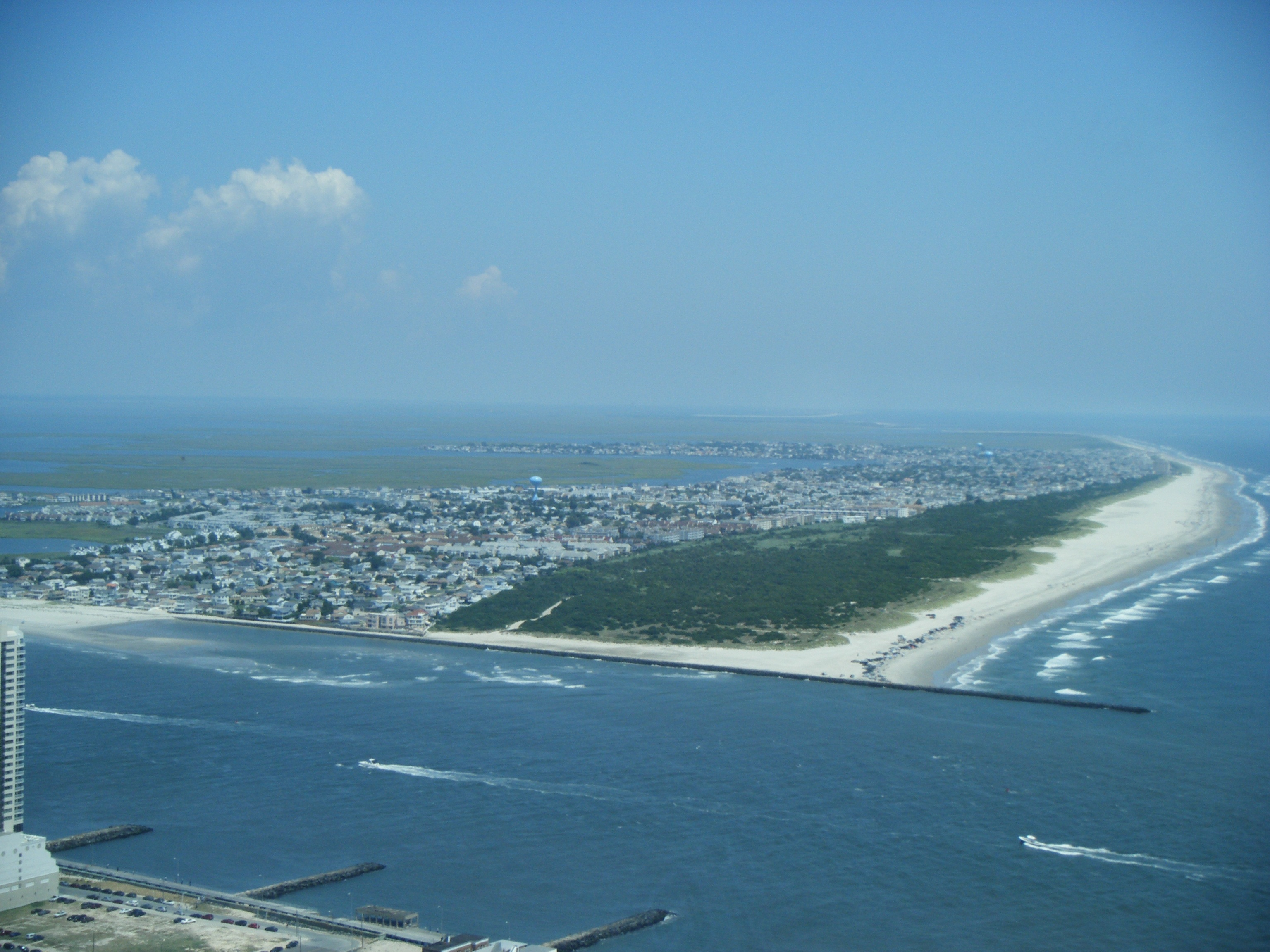
Entrance to inlet looking to Brigantine

== Geography ==
Absecon Inlet leads from the Atlantic Ocean through barrier islands in Atlantic County, New Jersey. Its southern shore is the north end of Absecon Island, on which lies Atlantic City, New Jersey. Absecon Lighthouse is south of the inlet and overlooks it from the north end of Absecon Island. Brigantine Island is to the north and east. The Brigantine Bridge carries New Jersey Route 87 over the inlet.

Absecon Inlet separates Absecon Island from Brigantine Island, and including its continuation, Absecon Channel, connects Absecon Bay and Reeds Bay with the Atlantic Ocean.

Absecon Inlet was described in 1878, viz.,

Absecon Inlet is navigable for small-sized coasting vessels, and furnishes ingress and exit to the waters of Absecon and Reed's Bays, small bodies of water in Atlantic County. No considerable stream except Absecon Creek flows into them.

== Namesakes ==
Two United States Navy ships—the cargo ship USS Absecon, in use briefly in 1918, and the aircraft catapult training ship USS Absecon, in commission from 1943 to 1947—and the United States Coast Guard cutter USCGC Absecon, in commission from 1949 to 1972, were named for Absecon Inlet.
