= Atlantic City Expressway =

Toll highway in New Jersey, US

Atlantic City Expressway
- Atlantic City Expressway highlighted in green

Route information
- Maintained by SJTA
- Length: 44.19 mi (71.12 km)
- Existed: 1964–present
- Component highways: Route 446 (unsigned) entire length

Major junctions
- West end: Route 42 / CR 705 in Washington Township
- Route 73 in Winslow Township; Route 54 in Hammonton; Route 50 in Hamilton Township; G.S. Parkway in Egg Harbor Township; US 9 in Pleasantville; US 40 / US 322 in Atlantic City
- East end: Fairmount Avenue / Baltic Avenue / Columbus Boulevard in Atlantic City

Location
- Country: United States
- State: New Jersey
- Counties: Gloucester, Camden, Atlantic

Highway system
- New Jersey State Highway Routes; Interstate; US; State; Scenic Byways
← Route 445	446	→ Route 446X

The Atlantic City Expressway, officially numbered, but unsigned, as Route 446 and abbreviated A.C. Expressway, ACE, or ACX, and known locally as the Expressway, is a 44.1-mile (70.97 km) controlled-access toll road in the U.S. state of New Jersey, managed and operated by the South Jersey Transportation Authority. It runs from Route 42 from Turnersville southeast to Atlantic City. The Atlantic City Expressway is signed as east–west, though the mileage and exits decrease as if one is travelling north–south. It connects Philadelphia and the surrounding metro area with Atlantic City and other Jersey Shore resorts, and also serves other South Jersey communities, including Hammonton and Mays Landing. The expressway intersects many major roads, including Route 73 in Winslow Township, Route 54 in Hammonton, Route 50 in Hamilton Township, the Garden State Parkway in Egg Harbor Township, US 9 in Pleasantville, and the Atlantic City–Brigantine Connector near the eastern terminus in Atlantic City.

The Atlantic City Expressway uses all-electronic tolling, with two mainline toll plazas (Egg Harbor in Hamilton Township and Pleasantville) and ramp tolls at seven interchanges. Tolls can be paid using E-ZPass or toll by plate. The total cost to travel the length of the Atlantic City Expressway for passenger vehicles is currently $6.49. The expressway features one service plaza, the Frank S. Farley Service Plaza, in Hamilton Township a short distance west of the Egg Harbor Toll Plaza, as well as a gas station and mini-mart in Pleasantville.

Plans for the highway began in the 1930s when a parkway was proposed between Camden and Atlantic City that was never built. Plans resurfaced for the road in the 1950s when a group of officials led by State Senator Frank S. Farley pushed for a road to help the area economy. The New Jersey Expressway Authority was created in 1962, tasked with building an expressway. The Atlantic City Expressway was built between 1963 and 1965 at a total cost of $48.2 million. The South Jersey Transportation Authority assumed control of the road in 1991 from the New Jersey Expressway Authority.

== Route description ==
The Atlantic City Expressway begins at an interchange with Route 42 in Turnersville in Washington Township, Gloucester County, where the freeway right-of-way continues north as the North–South Freeway, a part of Route 42. Here, Route 42 continues south on the Black Horse Pike and Route 168 continues north on the Black Horse Pike. A westbound exit provides a connection to County House Road (CR 705) and northbound Route 168. The expressway then heads southeast as a four-lane road, straddling between Washington Township and Gloucester Township, Camden County. On the border between Gloucester Township and Winslow Township, the Atlantic City Expressway features a diamond interchange with Berlin-Cross Keys Road (CR 689). Past this interchange, there is a diamond interchange with Williamstown Road (CR 536 Spur) near Sicklerville. The expressway passes under Malaga Road (CR 536) and then features a partial interchange with Fleming Pike (CR 723), with an eastbound exit and a westbound entrance. It meets Route 73 at another partial interchange, with a westbound exit and an eastbound entrance, where the roadway widens to six lanes. Past this interchange, the highway passes over the Southern Railroad of New Jersey's Southern Running Track line.

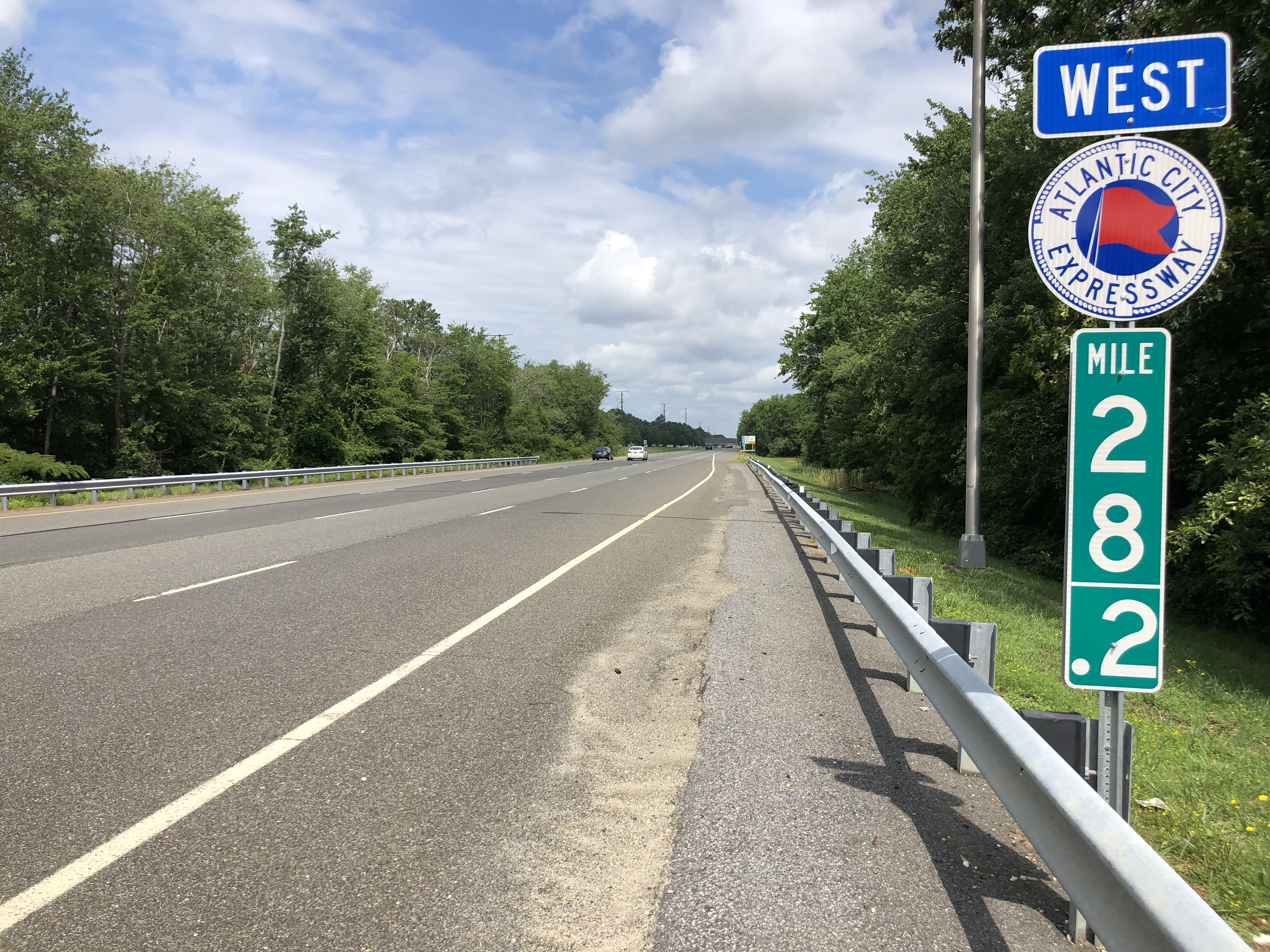
Atlantic City Expressway westbound past the Route 54 interchange in Hammonton

The expressway crosses into Hammonton in Atlantic County. Continuing to the southeast, it passes over the Beesleys Point Secondary railroad line operated by the Cape May Seashore Lines railroad before it encounters Route 54 at a partial cloverleaf interchange. It enters Hamilton Township and passes under Weymouth Road (CR 559). The lanes of the Atlantic City Expressway in both directions split for the Frank S. Farley Service Plaza, which is located in the median of the expressway and accessible from both directions. Named for New Jersey State Senator Frank S. Farley and run by Applegreen, it has a building containing multiple fast-food restaurants, a Sunoco gas station, a mini-mart and gift shop with New Jersey Lottery sales, a seasonal farm market, an ATM, tourist information, and an electric vehicle charging station. The service plaza is also the site of the South Jersey Transportation Authority administrative offices and a New Jersey State Police barracks. Past the service plaza, the Atlantic City Expressway meets the mainline Egg Harbor Toll Plaza. It then features a partial cloverleaf interchange with Route 50, with the westbound exit and eastbound entrance being E-ZPass only. It meets Leipzig Avenue (CR 670), with another partial interchange featuring an eastbound off-ramp and a westbound on-ramp. Next, it has an eastbound exit and westbound entrance for Wrangleboro Road (CR 575), which provides access to Black Horse Pike (US 40/US 322) and the Hamilton Mall near Mays Landing. To and from the east, a ramp runs from the Atlantic City Expressway to the US 40/US 322 split.

The expressway then enters Egg Harbor Township. It has an interchange with Delilah Road (CR 646), which provides access to the Atlantic City International Airport, and passes under Tilton Road (CR 563). It features a cloverleaf interchange with the Garden State Parkway and crosses into Pleasantville. In Pleasantville, the expressway meets US 9 at a diamond interchange. It passes under Main Street (CR 585) and features a partial interchange with Franklin Boulevard, with a westbound exit and eastbound entrance.

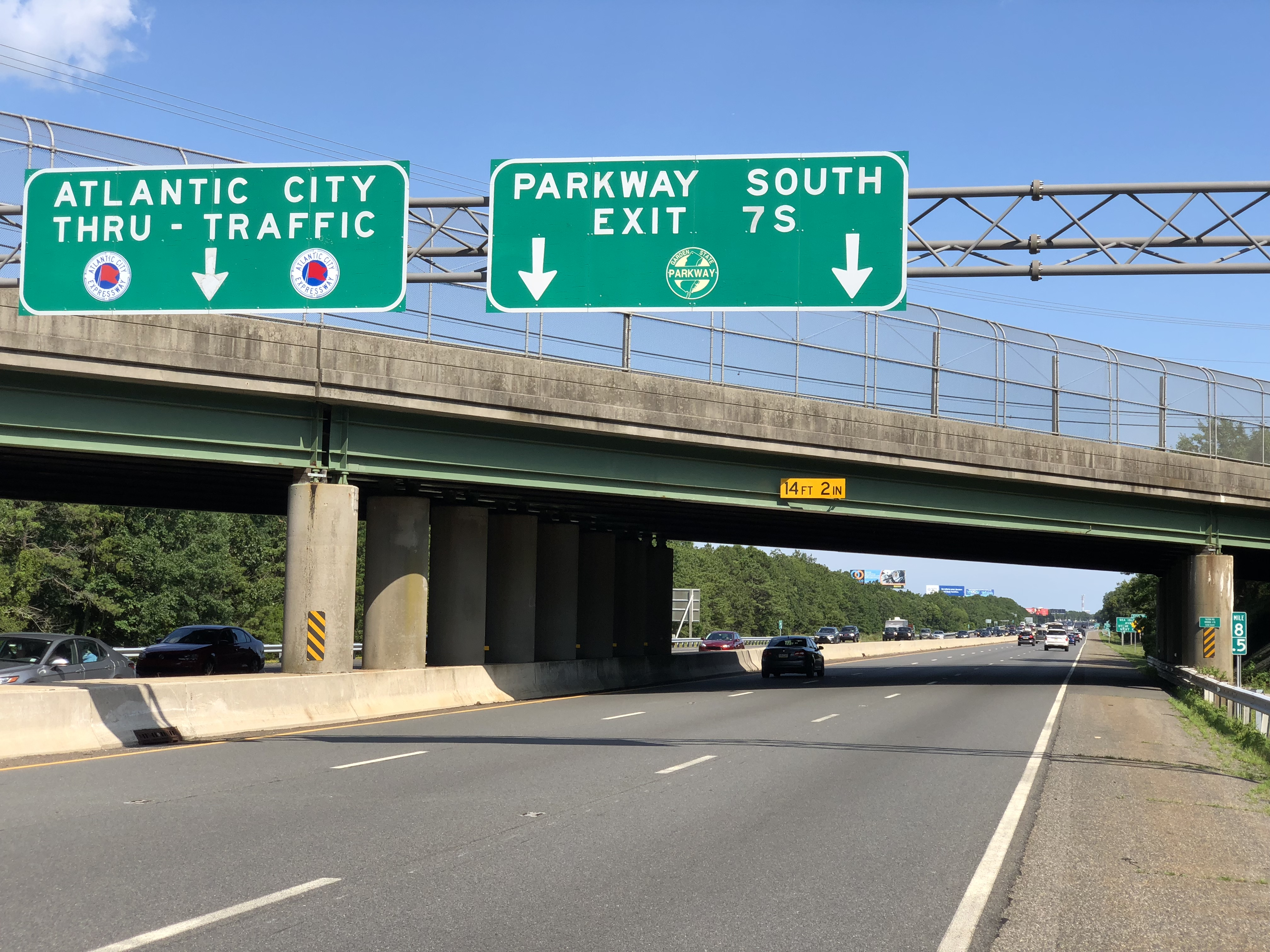
Atlantic City Expressway eastbound approaching the Garden State Parkway in Egg Harbor Township

The expressway then continues to the Pleasantville Toll Plaza. Past the toll plaza, the travel lanes separate and a park and ride lot, used by Atlantic City casino employees, lies within the median of the expressway. It then encounters the former Atlantic City Visitor Welcome Center and a Sunoco gas station/7-Eleven mini-mart in the median before it enters the city of Atlantic City. Upon entering Atlantic City, the expressway passes under the Southern Railroad of New Jersey's Pleasantville Industrial Track line and features an eastbound exit and westbound entrance with US 40/US 322. It then continues southeast, crossing the Beach Thorofare, and soon after encounters an eastbound exit and westbound entrance for the Atlantic City–Brigantine Connector, which provides access to the Atlantic City Convention Center, the Marina district, and Brigantine. The Atlantic City Expressway ends at a traffic light at the intersection with Baltic Avenue/Fairmount Avenue near Tanger Outlets Atlantic City, where the road becomes the one-way pair of Missouri Avenue eastbound (also known as Christopher Columbus Boulevard) and Arkansas Avenue westbound.

In 2019, the Atlantic City Expressway counted over 54 million toll-paying vehicles. The speed limit on the Atlantic City Expressway is 65 miles per hour (105 km/h) for most of the route. The Emergency Services Patrol provides motorist assistance along the expressway. Motorists needing assistance can dial #ACE or 609-965-7200 on their mobile phones. The entire length of the highway is part of the National Highway System, a network of roads important to the country's economy, defense, and mobility.

== Tolls ==
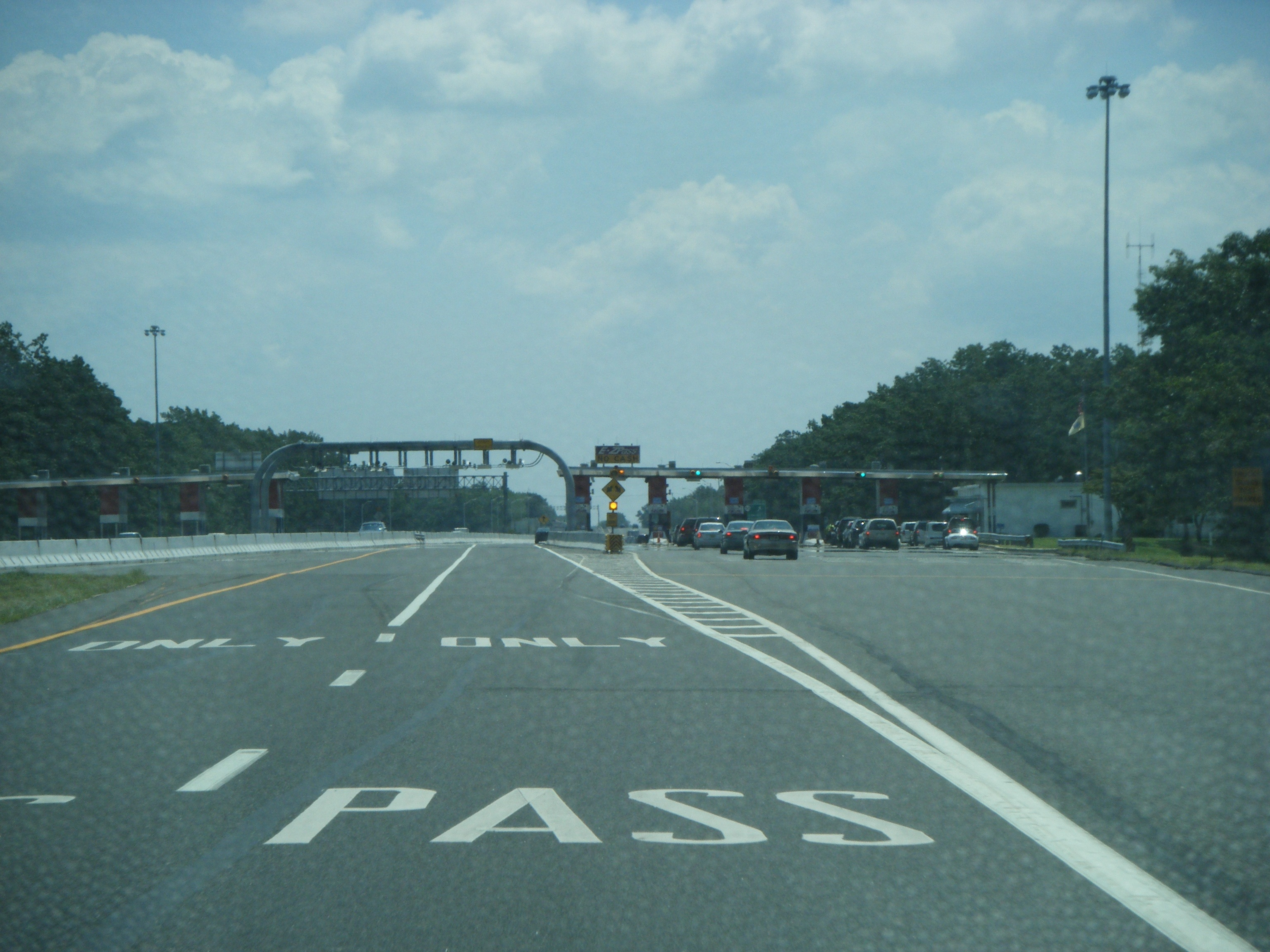
Egg Harbor mainline toll plaza

The Atlantic City Expressway uses all-electronic tolling, with tolls collected at overhead gantries in between exits, except at exit 41 where tolls are collected on the ramps when entering westbound or exiting eastbound. As of January 4, 2026, the toll for a 2 axle vehicle to drive the length of the expressway is $6.49 with E-ZPass or $12.98 with toll-by-plate.

Every year since 2013, with the exception of 2020 and 2021, eastbound tolls are waived at the Egg Harbor Toll Plaza for one hour in the late afternoon on the Friday before Memorial Day to promote the unofficial beginning of the summer tourist season at the Jersey Shore. Chickie's & Pete's, a local sports bar chain, pays for the tolls collected during this hour. In October 2014, eastbound tolls were waived at the Egg Harbor and Pleasantville toll plazas on Tuesdays between noon and midnight to encourage midweek tourism to Atlantic City.

== History ==
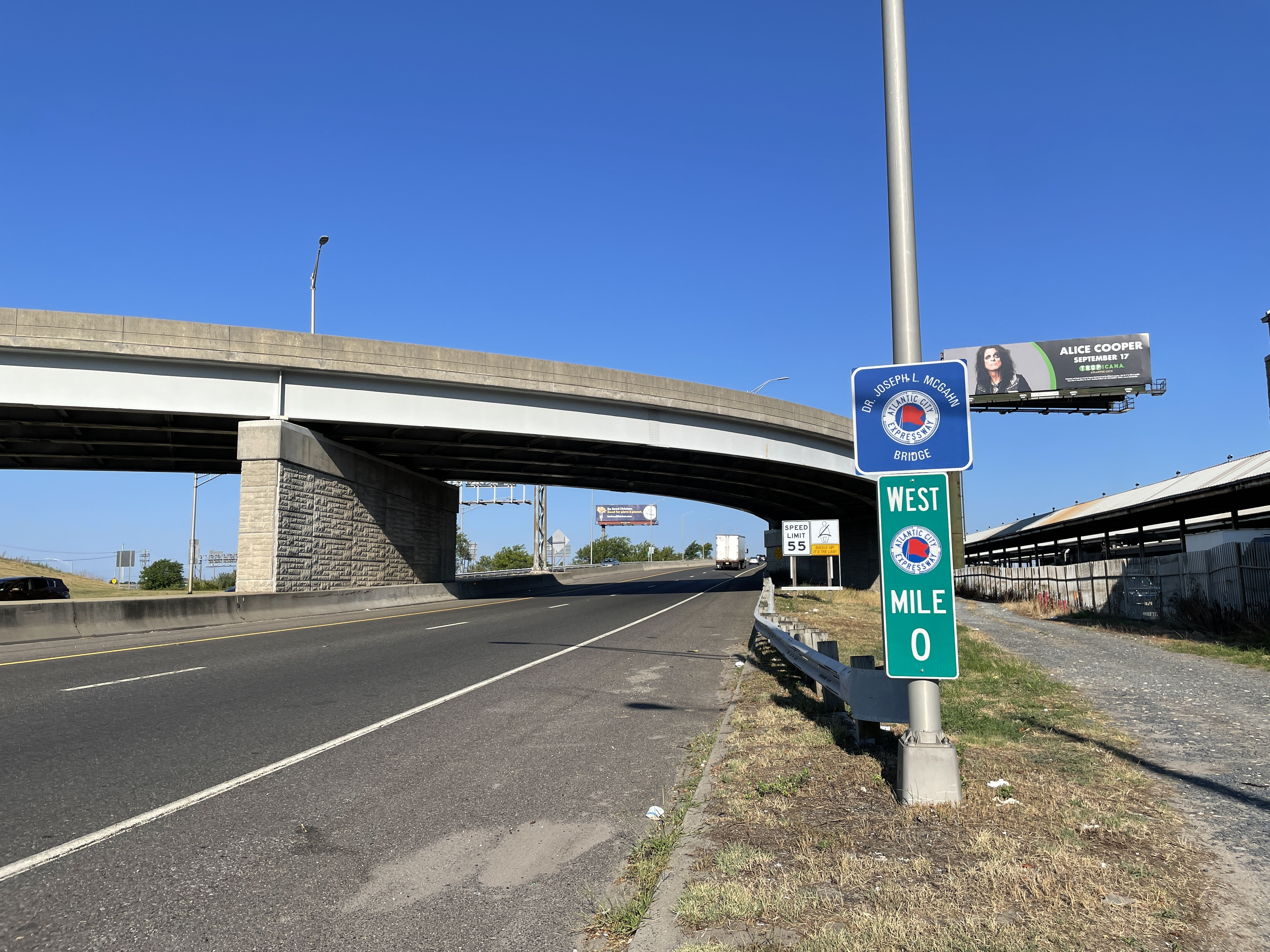
The beginning of the westbound Atlantic City Expressway in Atlantic City

The road was planned as a parkway in 1932, running from the Ben Franklin Bridge in Camden southeast to Atlantic City, but it never materialized. The idea for a limited-access road between the Philadelphia area and Atlantic City resurfaced in the 1950s when South Jersey officials, led by State Senator Frank S. Farley, pushed for an expressway between the two areas to help the economy of Southern New Jersey. The New Jersey State Highway Department authorized traffic studies for a toll road between Turnersville and Atlantic City in 1958 and 1959, and the New Jersey Expressway Authority Act in 1962 called for a five-member agency (the New Jersey Expressway Authority) with representatives from four Southern New Jersey counties to be responsible for issuing bonds to build and maintain the Atlantic City Expressway.

Construction of the Atlantic City Expressway started in the middle of 1963. The design was to feature a 300- to 400-foot-wide roadway with 12-foot-wide travel lanes and right shoulders as well as 3-foot-wide left shoulders. The part between Route 42 in Turnersville and the Garden State Parkway in Egg Harbor Township was completed on July 31, 1964, and the part between the Garden State Parkway and Atlantic City was finished in July 1965. Construction of the Atlantic City Expressway cost a total of $48.2 million. With the completion of the road, it was anticipated that it would increase tourism to Atlantic City. However, the opening of the expressway did not initially increase tourism to Atlantic City, and toll projections were below expectations. The opening of the Atlantic City Expressway, along with the connecting Garden State Parkway, provided a shorter route to Jersey Shore resort towns in Cape May County and Long Beach Island; travel times to Cape May County were reduced by 30 to 45 minutes. Prior to the completion of the expressway, traffic had to use Black Horse Pike or White Horse Pike to reach the Jersey Shore. With the legalization of casino gambling in Atlantic City in 1978, traffic along the Atlantic City Expressway increased. The construction of the expressway also led to development near the interchange serving Mays Landing, including the Hamilton Mall.

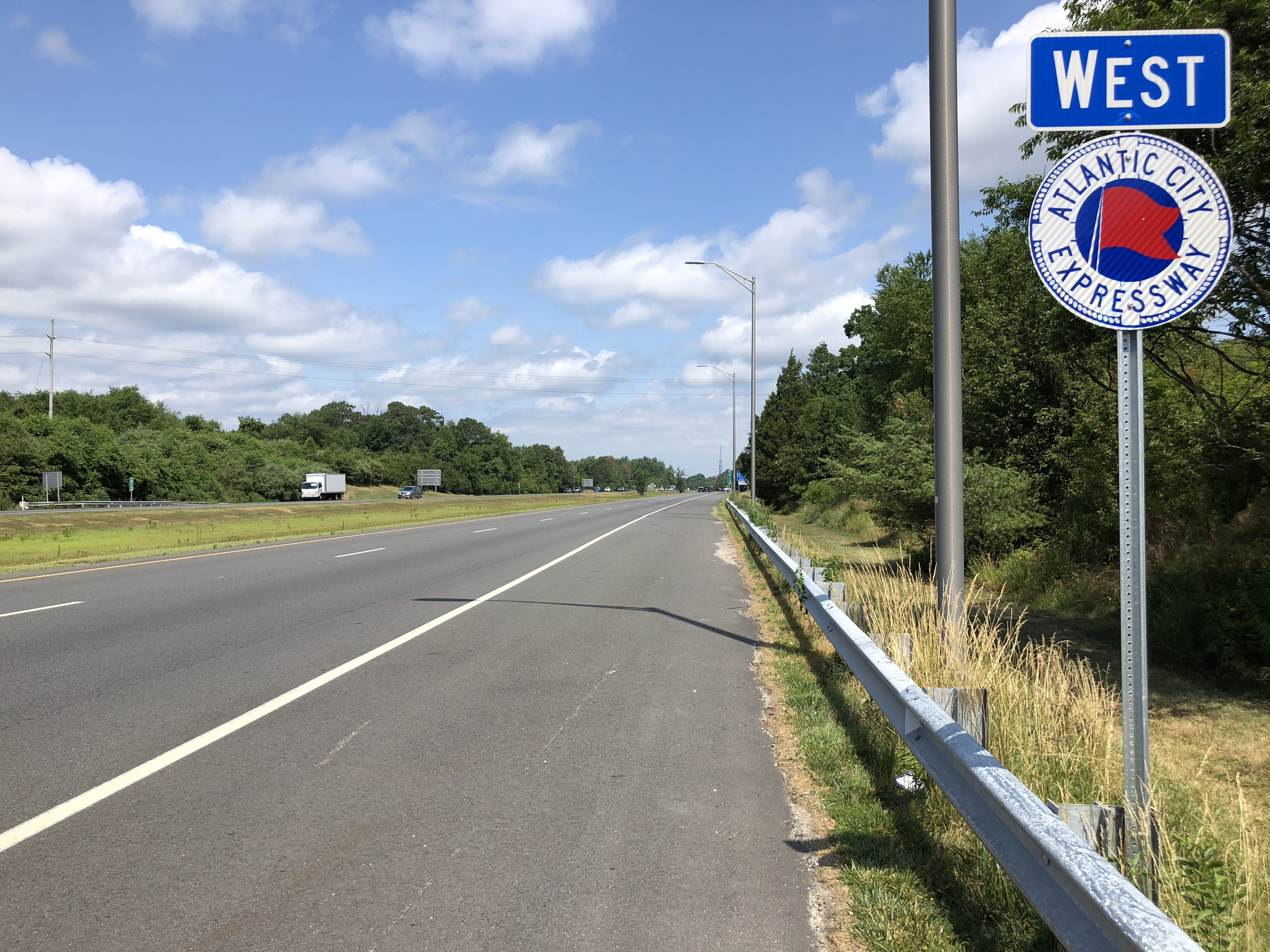
Atlantic City Expressway westbound past the CR 689 interchange in Gloucester Township

Tolls on the Atlantic City Expressway initially cost $0.75 at the Egg Harbor Toll Plaza and $0.15 at the Pleasantville Toll Plaza. In 1969, tolls increased to $1.00 at the Egg Harbor Toll Plaza and to $0.25 at the Pleasantville Toll Plaza.

In April 1977, whats now the service area was renamed in honor of Frank S Farley, who died shortly after.

In the late 1980s, a third eastbound lane was added between the interchange with Route 73 and the Pleasantville Toll Plaza, while the number of lanes was increased at both the Egg Harbor and Pleasantville toll plazas.

In 1991, the SJTA was created by the New Jersey Legislature to operate the Atlantic City Expressway, the Atlantic City International Airport, and operations of the Atlantic County Transportation Authority.

On November 11, 1998, the Atlantic City Expressway started accepting E-ZPass for the payment of tolls; the expressway was the first toll road in New Jersey to use the electronic toll collection system. Tolls along the expressway increased on November 30, 1998, in order to fund a capital improvements plan, with the Egg Harbor Toll Plaza increasing to $2.00.

In 2000, the Atlantic City Visitor Welcome Center opened in the median of the expressway near Atlantic City. Construction of the welcome center cost $3.5 million. The welcome center offered amenities including tourist information, T-shirts, restrooms, and E-ZPass sales. That same year, a new interchange with Berlin-Cross Keys Road (CR 689) on the border of Gloucester Township and Winslow Township was completed for $5 million. The completion of this interchange led to the increase of adjacent retail development.

The Atlantic City–Brigantine Connector was completed on July 31, 2001, to connect the Atlantic City Expressway to the Marina District and Brigantine.

Exit 5 was built into a full interchange as part of a project completed in 2002.

Traffic along the expressway peaked in 2008 with over 66.9 million vehicles; however, traffic volumes started to decline as Atlantic City was affected by the Great Recession and increased competition following the legalization of casino gambling in Pennsylvania. Tolls along the Atlantic City Expressway increased in 2009, with the Egg Harbor Toll Plaza toll increasing to $3.00.

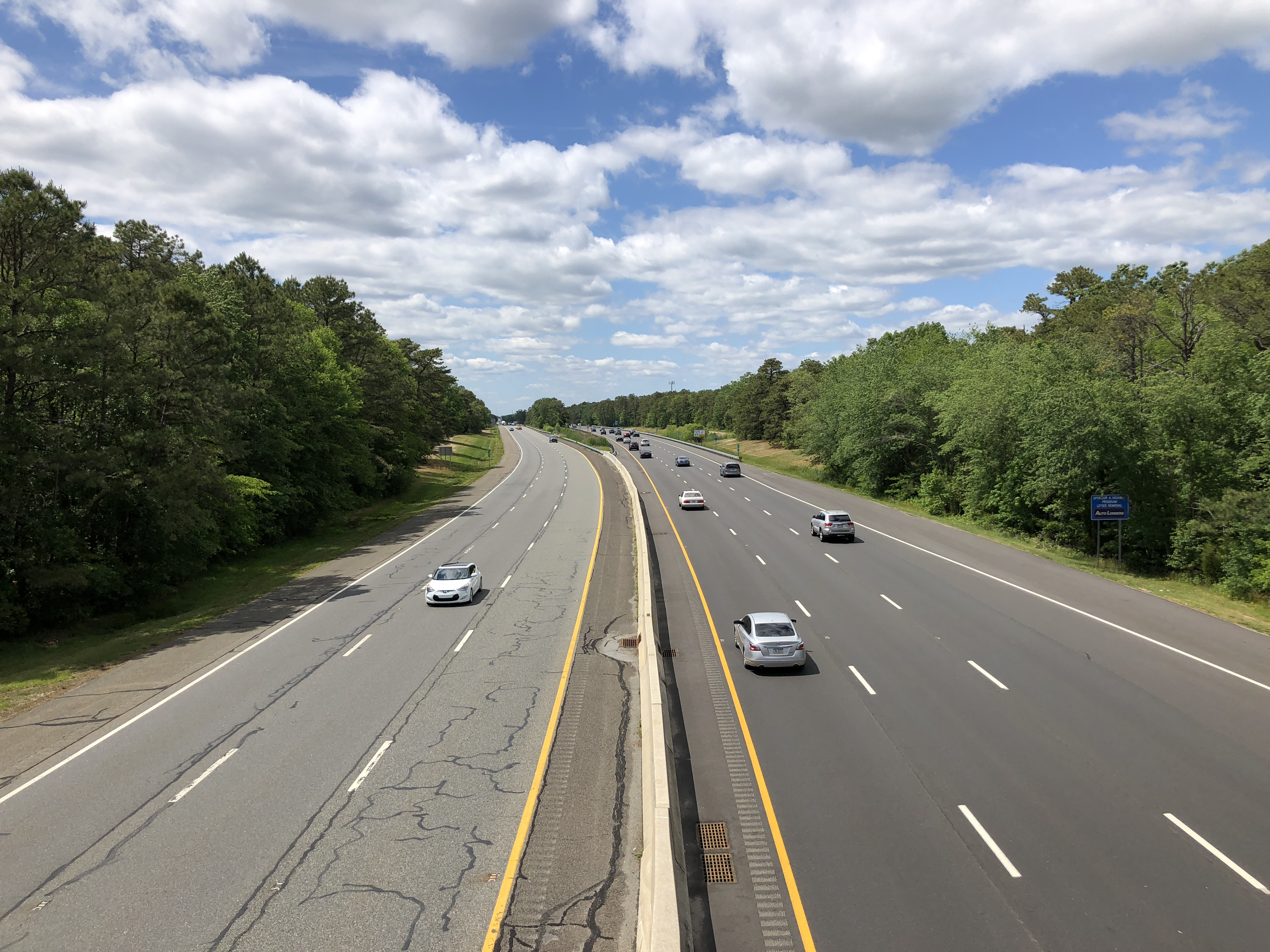
Atlantic City Expressway westbound in Hamilton Township

On November 21, 2008, work began on the reconstruction of exit 17, with completion on June 18, 2010. As a result of reconstructing this interchange, the SJTA approved raising the interchange toll to $3.00. This new rate is charged to motorists heading to or from the east along the Atlantic City Expressway at Route 50. The proposal drew opposition from area officials who felt the proposed rate was too high. The westbound exit and eastbound entrance at exit 17 were designed to be E-ZPass only, the first such interchange on the Atlantic City Expressway.

In 2007, it was announced that the Atlantic City Expressway from milepost 7.0–31.0 would be widened in the westbound direction to accommodate a third lane from north of the Garden State Parkway to Route 73. exit 17 (Route 50) would be reconstructed to form a full movement interchange (completed June 18, 2010), and the Egg Harbor Toll Plaza would receive Express E-ZPass lanes to allow traffic to maintain highway speed. Construction on these three projects was financed by a $25 million bond. The first phase was completed in the middle of 2010 and the Express E-ZPass was completed in May 2011. The work under the widening project also included improvements to bridges, lighting, and guide signs. Also, intelligent transportation system technology, such as traffic cameras and variable-message signs, were added to the Atlantic City Expressway to enhance safety and aid in monitoring traffic. The first phase widened the road from the Garden State Parkway to the Egg Harbor Toll Plaza. The second phase widened the road from the Egg Harbor Toll Plaza to milepost 24.5. The third phase widened the road west to Route 73. The ITS components were installed along these sections of the roadway through the course of each phase. The widening work was completed in May 2014 and the third lane opened in its entirety by Memorial Day 2014. The fourth phase added ITS technology to the parts of the road that are not being widened.

The Atlantic City Visitor Welcome Center closed on May 1, 2019, due to a lack of visitors.

On March 24, 2020, the South Jersey Transportation Authority suspended cash tolls along the Atlantic City Expressway due to the COVID-19 pandemic, with all tolls collected either electronically or by using coins in exact change lanes. Collection of cash tolls along the expressway resumed on May 19, 2020. On September 13, 2020, tolls at the Egg Harbor Toll Plaza increased from $3.00 to $4.25 and the $0.75 tolls at the Pleasantville Toll Plaza and several interchanges increased to $1.25. On January 1, 2022, tolls along the Atlantic City Expressway increased 3 percent, with the Egg Harbor Toll Plaza increasing to $4.40 and the Pleasantville Toll Plaza and several interchanges increasing to $1.30. Another toll hike occurred on January 1, 2023, which increased tolls to $4.55 at the Egg Harbor Toll Plaza and to $1.35 at the Pleasantville Toll Plaza and several interchanges. On January 1, 2024, tolls increased to $4.70 at the Egg Harbor Toll Plaza and to $1.40 at the Pleasantville Toll Plaza and several interchanges. On January 1, 2025, tolls increased to $4.85 at the Egg Harbor Toll Plaza and to $1.45 at the Pleasantville Toll Plaza and several interchanges.

== Future ==
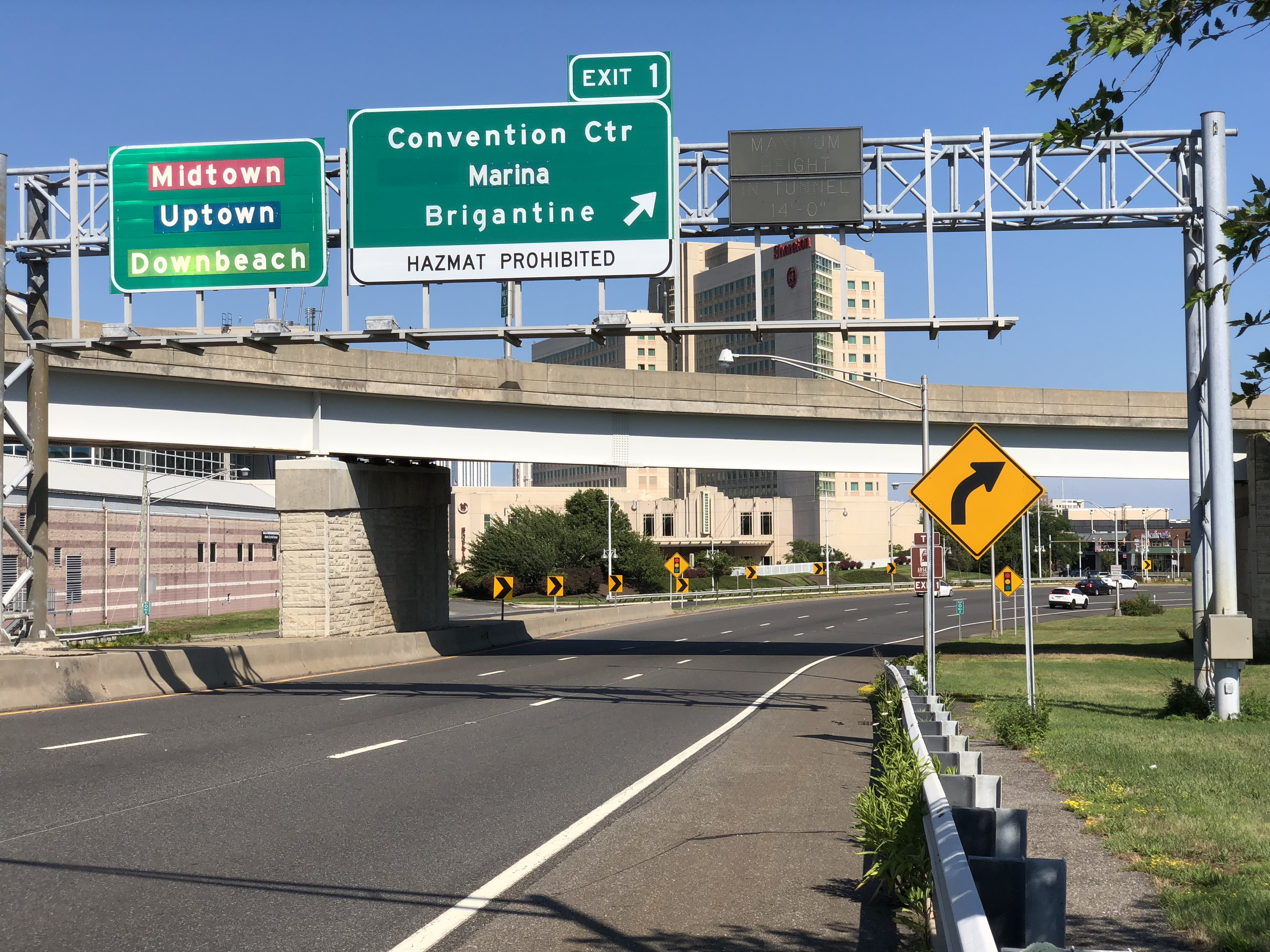
Atlantic City Expressway eastbound at the junction with the Brigantine Connector in Atlantic City

The SJTA revealed plans for a major road improvement project that would link the Atlantic City International Airport to the Atlantic City Expressway, with construction beginning as early as 2013. The plan includes new ramps with two overpasses over the expressway. The road would connect Amelia Earhart Boulevard with an overpass above Airport Circle. Plans also call for building a service road with another overpass that would provide access to Delilah Road. Another project involves the installation of an overpass at the end of Amelia Earhart Boulevard next to the entrance to the FAA Tech Center. The proposed roadway would intrude upon a small section of a mobile home park and land owned by Egg Harbor Township. In 2020, the interchange's cost was projected at $60 million.

The 2019 Statewide Transportation Improvement Plan included a project that would add a flyover ramp from the Garden State Parkway northbound to the Atlantic City Expressway westbound. Construction was estimated to cost $20 million.

In April 2020, as part of a plan to raise tolls by 37% on the Atlantic City Expressway, the South Jersey Transportation Authority announced a $150 million plan to widen the expressway to three lanes in each direction from exit 31 to the western terminus with Route 42. The project would also replace the current tolling system with an all-electronic tolling system using E-ZPass or toll-by-plate, a tolling system which mails an invoice to license plates without E-ZPass. In 2022, a request for bids was issued to implement all-electronic tolling along the Atlantic City Expressway, which would serve as a pilot program for all-electronic tolling on toll roads in New Jersey. Groundbreaking for the all-electronic toll system took place on October 30, 2023, and the system was implemented on January 4, 2026. The widening of the Atlantic City Expressway to six lanes between exit 31 and the western terminus, which will build new bridges and reconstruct the interchange with Route 42, is expected to begin in 2024 with completion in 2025.

== Exit list ==
Mileposts run from east to west.

County	Location	mi	km	Exit	Destinations	Notes
Gloucester	Washington Township	44.2	71.1	–	Route 42 north to I-76 west / I-295 / N.J. Turnpike – Camden, Philadelphia	Western terminus
Gloucester	Washington Township	44.0	70.8	44	CR 705 to Route 42 south / Route 168 – Sicklerville, Blackwood	Westbound exit only; feeds into Route 42 exit 7
Camden	Gloucester–Winslow township line	40.7	65.5	41	CR 689 (Berlin-Cross Keys Road) – Gloucester Township, Winslow Township	Tolled eastbound exit and westbound entrance
Camden	Winslow Township	38.4	61.8	38	CR 536 Spur (Williamstown Road) – Sicklerville, Williamstown	Tolled eastbound exit and westbound entrance
Camden	Winslow Township	32.7	52.6	33	CR 723 – Winslow, Williamstown	Eastbound exit and westbound entrance
Camden	Winslow Township	31.4	50.5	31	Route 73 – Winslow, Blue Anchor	Westbound exit and eastbound entrance
Atlantic	Hammonton	27.8	44.7	28	Route 54 – Hammonton, Vineland	Tolled eastbound exit and westbound entrance
Atlantic	Hamilton Township	21.5	34.6	Frank S. Farley Service Plaza		
Atlantic	Hamilton Township	17.4	28.0	Egg Harbor Toll Plaza		
Atlantic	Hamilton Township	16.8	27.0	17	Route 50 – Egg Harbor, Mays Landing	Tolled westbound exit and eastbound entrance
Atlantic	Hamilton Township	13.5	21.7	14	CR 670 – Hamilton Township, Galloway Township	Eastbound exit and westbound entrance
Atlantic	Hamilton Township	12.3	19.8	12	US 40 – Mays Landing, Smithville	Tolled westbound exit and eastbound entrance; Smithville not signed westbound
Atlantic	Egg Harbor Township	9.5	15.3	9	CR 646 (Delilah Road) – Atlantic City International Airport, FAA Tech. Center	Tolled westbound exit and eastbound entrance; FAA Technical Center not signed eastbound
Atlantic	Egg Harbor Township	7.2	11.6	7	G.S. Parkway – Cape May, New York	Signed as exits 7S (south) and 7N (north); exits 38A-B on G.S. Parkway
Atlantic	Pleasantville	5.4	8.7	5	US 9 – Pleasantville, Northfield, Smithville	Tolled eastbound exit and westbound entrance; signed for Pleasantville eastbound, Northfield/Smithville westbound
Atlantic	Pleasantville	4.8	7.7	4	Pleasantville, Absecon	Westbound exit and eastbound entrance; access via Franklin Boulevard
Atlantic	Pleasantville	4.4	7.1	Pleasantville Toll Plaza		
Atlantic	Pleasantville	3.0	4.8	Gas station/mini-mart		
Atlantic	Atlantic City	2.1	3.4	2	US 40 / US 322 (Black Horse Pike) – Atlantic City	Eastbound exit and westbound entrance
Atlantic	Atlantic City	0.1	0.16	1	Convention Center, Marina, Brigantine	Access via A.C.–Brigantine Connector; eastbound exit and westbound entrance
Atlantic	Atlantic City	0.0	0.0	–	Fairmount Avenue / Baltic Avenue / Columbus Boulevard	Eastern terminus; at-grade intersection
1.000 mi = 1.609 km; 1.000 km = 0.621 mi: Electronic toll collection; Incomplete access
