= New Jersey Route 49 =

State highway in southern, New Jersey, US

Route 49

Route information
- Maintained by NJDOT
- Length: 53.80 mi (86.58 km)
- Existed: 1927–present
- Tourist routes: Bayshore Heritage Byway; Pine Barrens Byway

Major junctions
- West end: I-295 / N.J. Turnpike / US 40 / US 130 in Pennsville Township
- Route 45 in Salem; Route 77 in Bridgeton; Route 47 in Millville; Route 55 in Millville
- East end: Route 50 / CR 557 in Upper Township

Location
- Country: United States
- State: New Jersey
- Counties: Salem, Cumberland, Atlantic, Cape May

Highway system
- New Jersey State Highway Routes; Interstate; US; State; Scenic Byways
← Route 48	→ Route 50

Route 49 is a state highway in the southern part of the U.S. state of New Jersey. It runs 53.80 mi (86.58 km) from an interchange with the New Jersey Turnpike, Interstate 295 (I-295), and U.S. Route 40 (US 40) in Deepwater, Salem County, southeast to Route 50/County Route 557 (CR 557) in Tuckahoe, Cape May County. The route serves Salem, Cumberland, Atlantic, and Cape May counties, passing through rural areas and the communities of Salem, Bridgeton, and Millville along the way. It is a two-lane, undivided road for most of its length.

Route 49 was established in 1927 to run from Salem to Clermont, running along its present alignment between Salem and Millville, following current Route 47 between Millville and South Dennis, and running along present-day Route 83 between South Dennis and Clermont. It replaced a branch of pre-1927 Route 6 between Salem and Bridgeton and a part of pre-1927 Route 15 between Bridgeton and South Dennis. In 1953, Route 49 was routed onto its current alignment, replacing a part of Route 44 between Salem and Deepwater and following the former alignment of Route 47 between Millville and Tuckahoe. In the 1960s, a freeway was planned for Route 49 between Deepwater and Millville, but it was never built. In the 2000s, many improvements have been or are being made to bridges along Route 49.

== Route description ==
=== Salem County ===
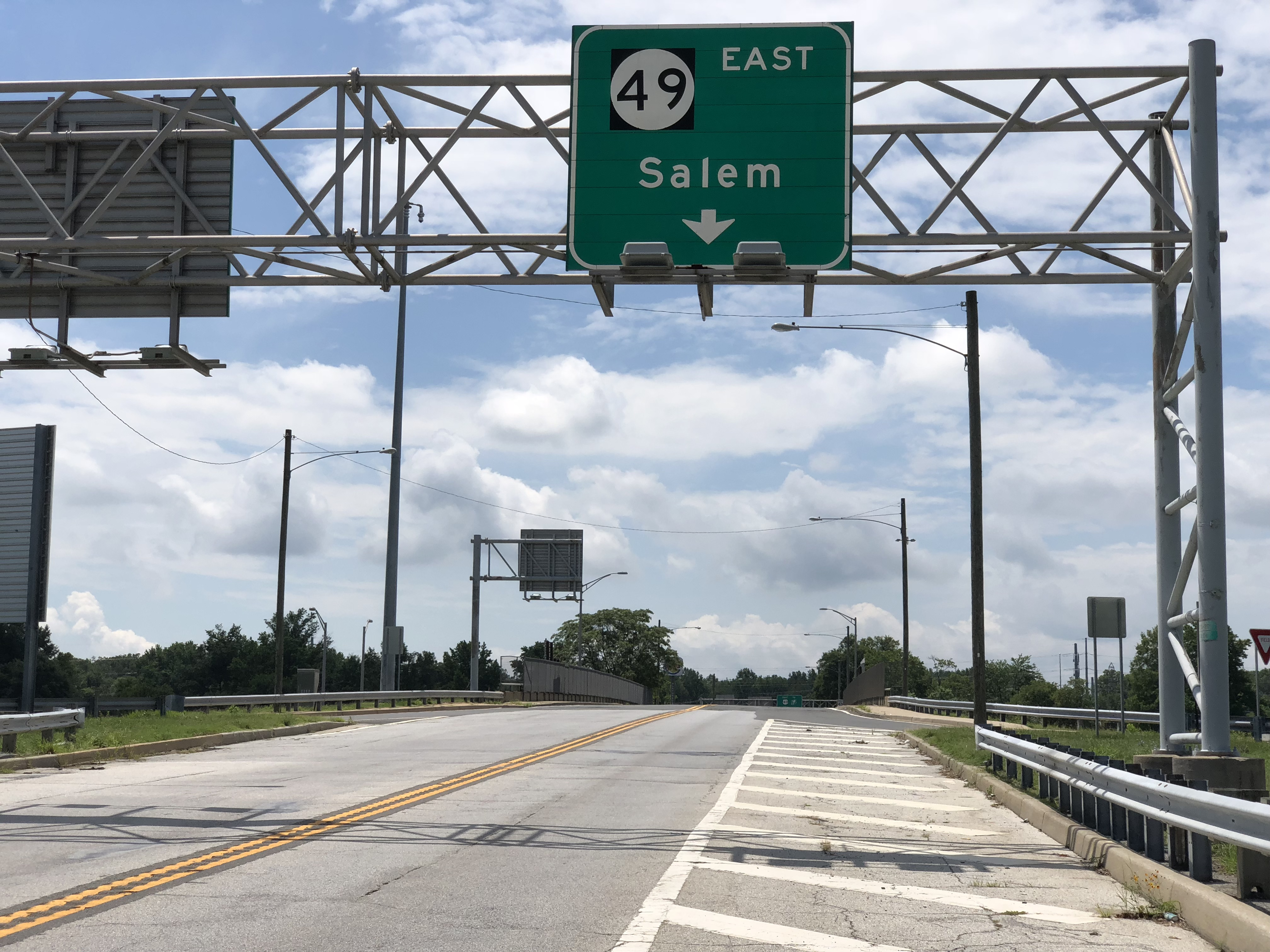
View east at the western terminus of Route 49 at I-295/US 40/US 130 in Pennsville

Route 49 heads southwest on Broadway from an interchange with the New Jersey Turnpike, I-295, and US 40 in the community of Deepwater in Pennsville Township, Salem County, near the Delaware Memorial Bridge. North of here, the road continues to the north as US 130. Route 49 passes through residential and commercial areas of Pennsville, turning to the south-southeast and passing west of Pennsville Memorial High School. The route intersects CR 630 (Fort Mott Road) before it continues into farmland. Route 49 then intersects the southern terminus of CR 551 (Hook Road and CR 632 (Lighthouse Road). It crosses the Salem River into Salem and becomes Front Street.

In Salem, the route intersects CR 657 (Griffith Street) at a crossing of the SMS Rail Lines' Salem Branch line and makes a right turn. It turns left onto Broadway and forms the main business district of the town. In downtown Salem, Route 49 intersects CR 625 (Chestnut Street), the southern terminus of Route 45 (Market Street), and CR 665 (Walnut Street). It crosses CR 658 (Keasbey Street/York Street) and enters Quinton Township, becoming Main Street and heading into agricultural areas. Route 49 heads east, meeting CR 650 (Hancocks Bridge Road) and CR 653 (Action Station Road). It crosses the Alloway Creek into the community of Quinton, where it intersects the southern terminus of CR 581 (Quinton Alloway Road) and CR 654 (Sickler Street). The route leaves Quinton and intersects CR 626 (Jericho Road), continuing southeast into wooded areas, where Route 49 crosses CR 667 (Pecks Corner Road) and CR 647 (Telegraph Road/Jericho Road).

=== Cumberland County ===
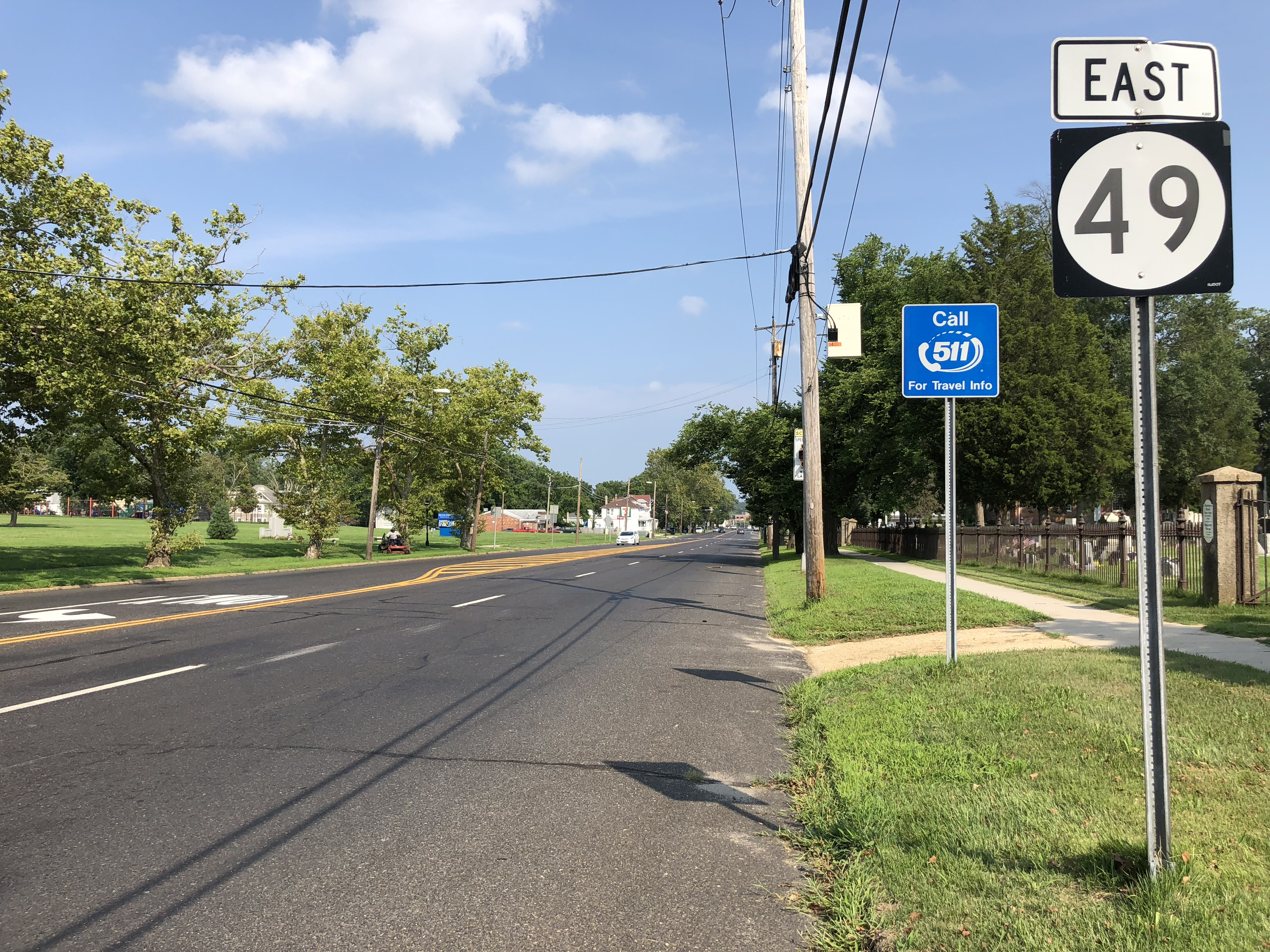
Route 49 eastbound past CR 607 in Bridgeton

Route 49 crosses a stream, Sarah Run, into Stow Creek Township, Cumberland County, and heads into farmland as Shiloh Pike. Here, it crosses CR 624 (Jericho Road) and CR 617 (Columbia Highway). The route then intersects CR 635 (Old Cohansey Road) and continues south along the border of Stow Creek Township to the west and Hopewell Township to the east, entering Shiloh at the intersection with Mill Road. In Shiloh, Route 49 meets CR 620 (Roadstown Road) and CR 753 (East Avenue/West Avenue) in the center of town and heads southeast, crossing CR 695 (Maple Avenue/Randolph Road). The route enters Hopewell Township and intersects CR 661 (Barretts Run Road).

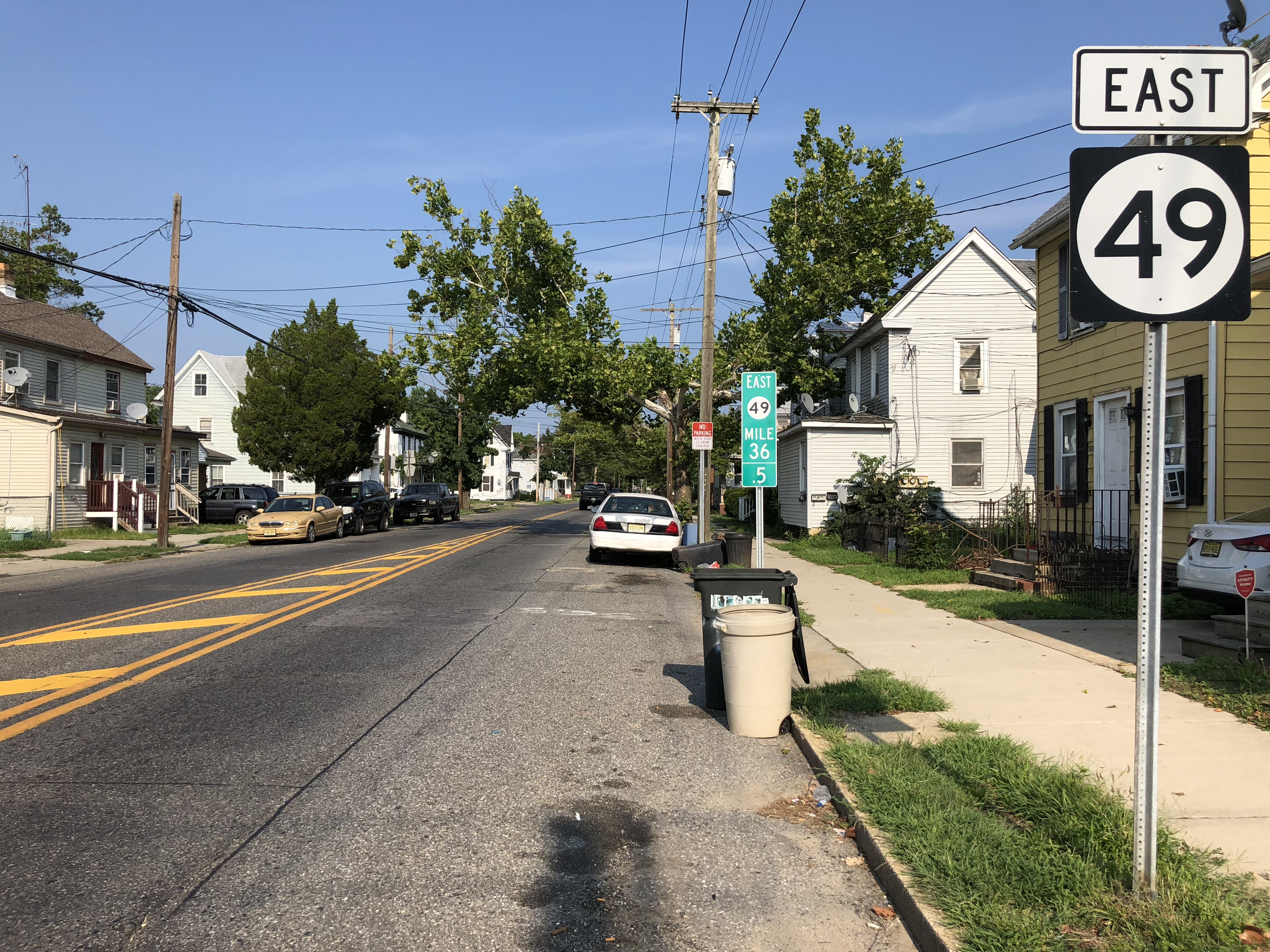
View east along Route 49 east of Third Street in Millville

Past this intersection, Route 49 enters a more suburban landscape, crossing CR 621 (W. Park Drive). The route enters Bridgeton and becomes West Broad Street. In Bridgeton, it intersects CR 607 (West Avenue), CR 650 (Fayette Street), and CR 697 (Atlantic Street). Route 49 crosses the Cohansey River and comes to an intersection with Pearl Street, which heads to the north as Route 77 and to the south as CR 609. Past Pearl Street, Route 49 intersects CR 670 (East Commerce Street/Buckshutem Road) and crosses a Winchester and Western Railroad line as it continues to the east on East Commerce Street. It crosses CR 638 (N. Burlington Road) and enters Fairfield Township.

Route 49 continues east through a mix of woods and farms, intersecting CR 553 (Gouldtown-Woodruff Road) and CR 675 (Fordville-Gouldtown Road). It enters Millville and becomes Main Street, intersecting CR 682 (Sugarman Avenue) and CR 634 (Nabb Avenue). It intersects three more county routes, CR 714 (Morias Avenue), CR 625 (Hogbin Road), and CR 712 (Reick Road), before heading into the city. It intersects CR 608 (Carmel Road) and CR 698 (Beech Street), CR 667 (Sharp Street), and CR 610 (Brandriff Avenue) before meeting CR 555 (Cedar Street), which it forms a concurrency with. The route crosses the Maurice River and enters downtown Millville, where it intersects Route 47 (Second Street). Past Route 47, CR 555 splits from Route 49 by turning north onto Third Street. Route 49 heads east through the eastern part of Millville, crossing a Winchester and Western Railroad line and intersecting CR 678 (Wade Boulevard) before reaching an interchange with Route 55. Past Route 55, Route 49 heads southeast into woodland and crosses into Maurice River Township. In Maurice River Township, Route 49 intersects CR 671 (Union Road), CR 646 (Port Elizabeth-Cumberland Road), and CR 644 (Hesstown Road). Route 49 eventually forms the border of Maurice River Township to the north and Upper Township, Cape May County to the south.

=== Atlantic and Cape May counties ===
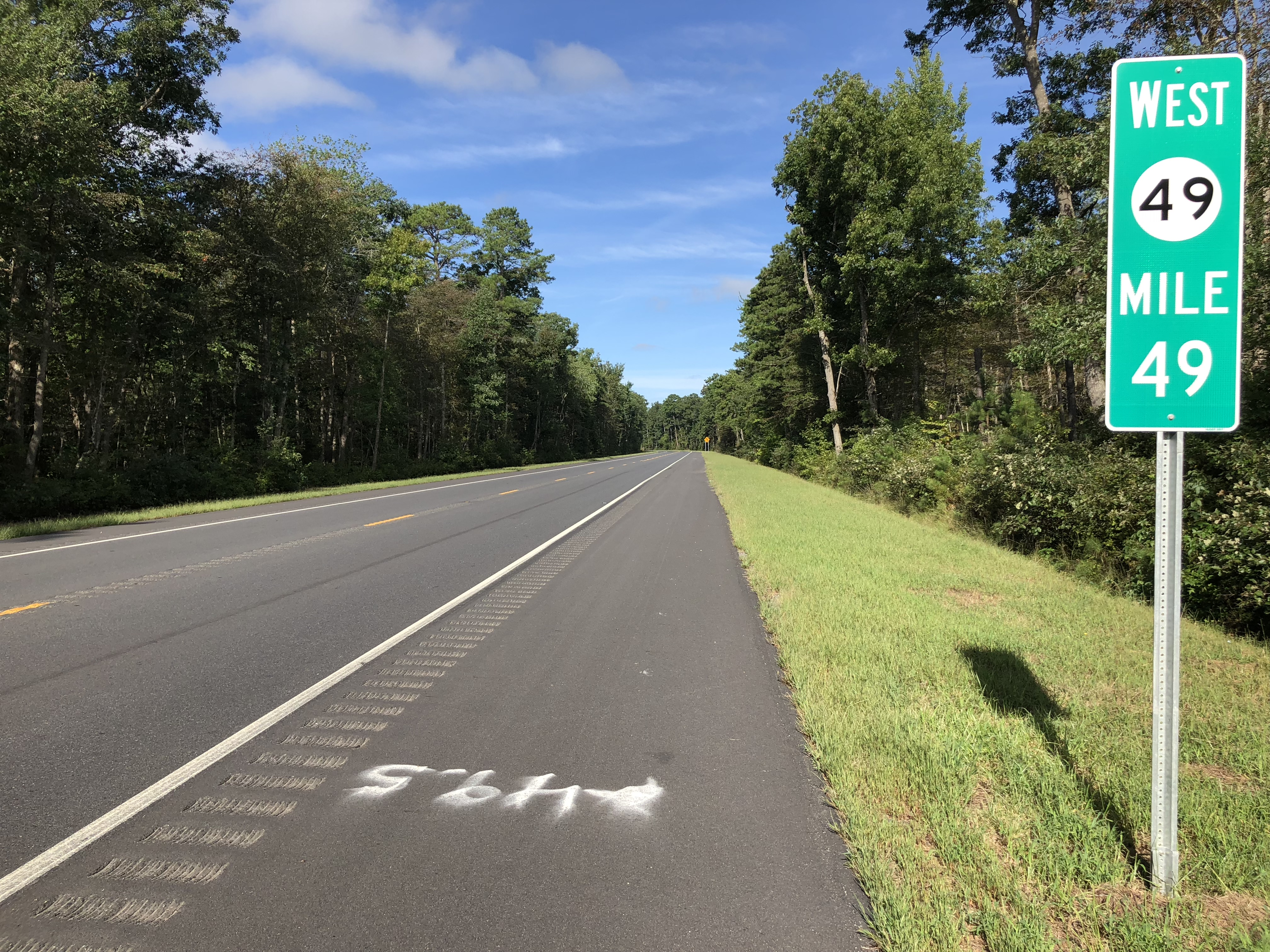
Route 49 westbound at milepost 49 in Estell Manor

Route 49 crosses the Tuckahoe River into Estell Manor, Atlantic County. It runs a short distance to the north of the Tuckahoe River and intersects CR 649 (Aetna Avenue) and CR 666 (Cape May Avenue) at Head of the River Church. The route crosses the Tuckahoe River into Upper Township, Cape May County, and intersects the eastern terminus of CR 548 (Tuckahoe Road), heading to the east. It intersects CR 632 (Marshallville Road) and then comes to CR 617 (Woodbine Road), which heads south to provide access to CR 557. Route 49 continues east into Tuckahoe, where it comes to a bridge over the Beesleys Point Secondary railroad line operated by the Cape May Seashore Lines railroad and intersects CR 659 (Railroad Avenue) before it ends at Route 50/CR 557.

== History ==
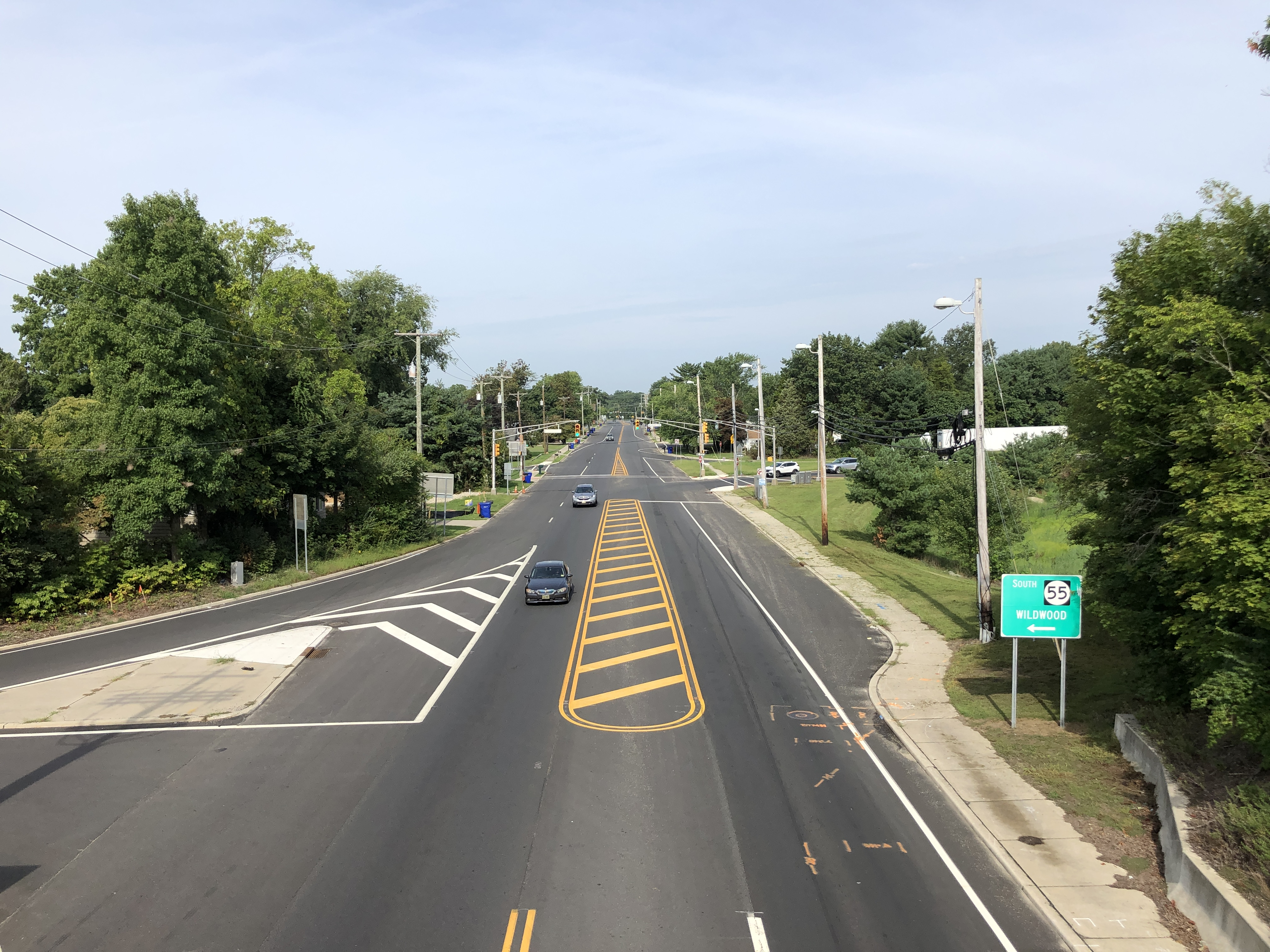
Route 49 westbound at Route 55 in Millville

The road from Millville to the east end of Bridgeton was maintained by the Bridgeton and Millville Turnpike, chartered in 1854. From the west end of Bridgeton to the Salem-Cumberland line, then called Marlborough, was built by the Shiloh Turnpike Company, chartered in 1866. From there to Quinton's Bridge, the road was maintained by the Marlborough and Quinton's Bridge Turnpike Company, chartered in 1864. The company was in business by at least 1920.

Route 49 was legislated in the 1927 New Jersey state highway renumbering to run from Route 45 in Salem to Route 4 (now US 9) in Clermont. The route replaced a branch of pre-1927 Route 6 between Salem and Bridgeton and a part of pre-1927 Route 15 between Bridgeton and South Dennis. A spur route of Route 49, Route S49, was created in 1927 to run from Route 49 in South Dennis to Route 4 in Rio Grande along the remainder of pre-1927 Route 15. Route S49 was extended to Wildwood in 1938.

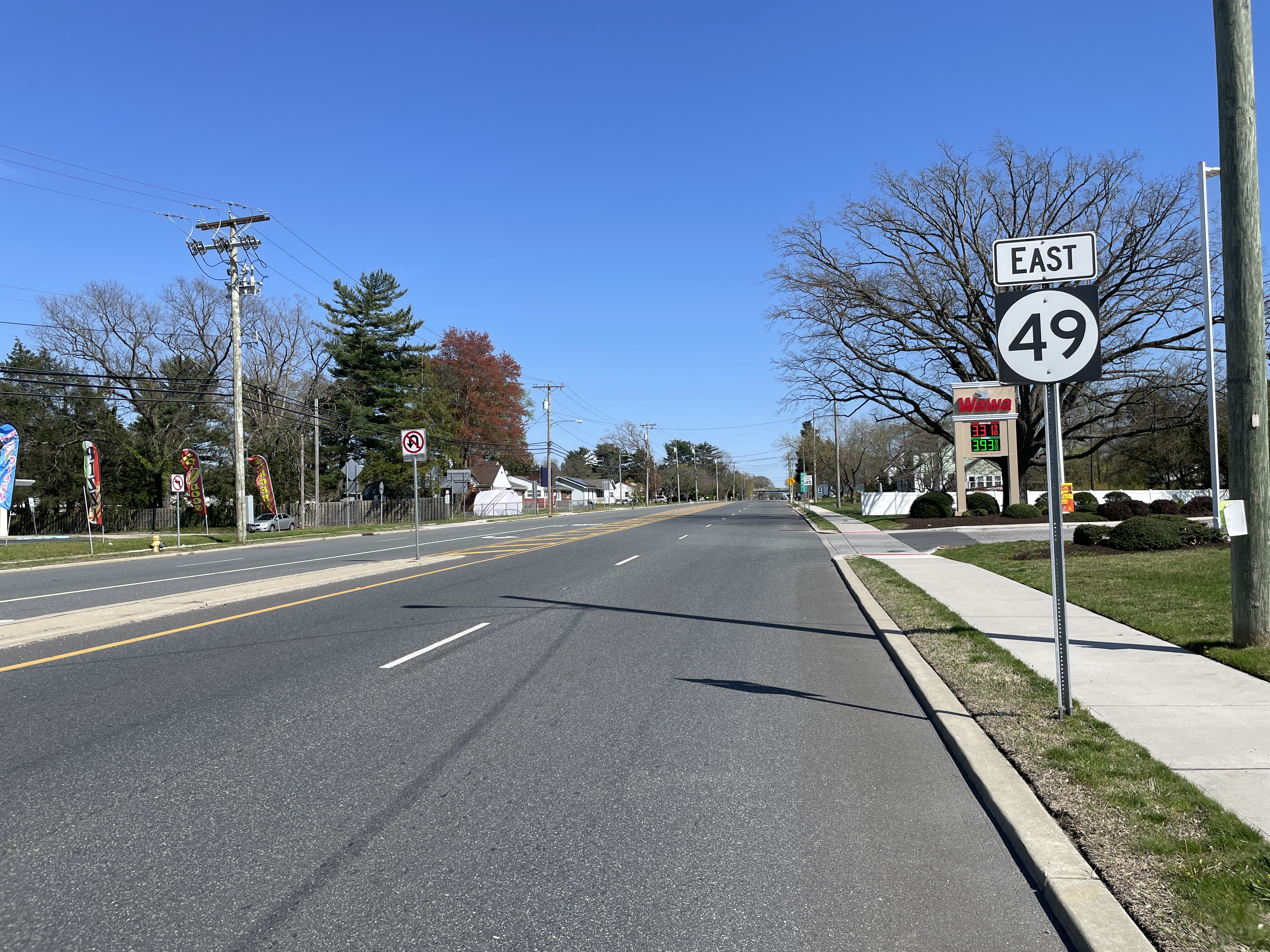
Route 49 eastbound past CR 678 (North Wade Boulevard) in Millville

In the 1953 New Jersey state highway renumbering, Route 49 was extended west along what was a part of Route 44 to Deepwater to end at US 40 and US 130 near the Delaware Memorial Bridge. The eastern part of the route was realigned to head from Millville east to Route 50 in Tuckahoe, replacing what had been the southern part of Route 47. Meanwhile, Route 47 was realigned to head south from Millville, replacing Route 49 from Millville to South Dennis and the length of Route S49. The portion of Route 49 from South Dennis to Clermont became Route 83.

A freeway was proposed for Route 49 in the early 1960s, running from I-295 and US 40 at the Delaware Memorial Bridge to Route 55 in Millville. However, this freeway was canceled by 1967 as it closely paralleled the planned Route 60 freeway, which itself was never built.

In the 2000s, construction has occurred to replace many bridges along Route 49. The drawbridge over the Salem River was replaced by a fixed span in the mid-2000s. On October 1, 2008, the bridge over the railroad line in Tuckahoe was closed for reconstruction and reopened in June 2009. The bridge over the Cohansey River in Bridgeton was also reconstructed. Construction on this bridge started in October 2008 and was completed in July 2009.

== Major intersections ==
County	Location	mi	km	Destinations	Notes
Salem	Pennsville Township	0.00	0.00	US 130 north (Shell Road) – Penns Grove	Continuation north
Salem	Pennsville Township	0.00	0.00	I-295 / N.J. Turnpike / US 40 – Trenton, Atlantic City, Delaware Memorial Bridge	Exit 1A on I-295 / Turnpike; no eastbound access to I-295 north/NJTP north
Salem	Pennsville Township	5.37	8.64	CR 551 north (Hook Road) to I-295 / N.J. Turnpike / US 40 – Delaware Memorial Bridge	Southern terminus of CR 551
Salem	Salem	9.05	14.56	Route 45 north (Market Street) – Woodstown, Camden	Southern terminus of Route 45
Salem	Quinton Township	12.44	20.02	CR 581 north (Quinton Alloway Road) – Alloway	Southern terminus of CR 581
Cumberland	Bridgeton	25.58	41.17	Route 77 north (Pearl Street) – Mullica Hill	Southern terminus of Route 77
Cumberland	Fairfield Township	28.31	45.56	CR 553 (Gouldtown-Woodruff Road) – Woodruff, Fairton	
Cumberland	Millville	36.13	58.15	CR 555 south (Cedar Street)	Western end of CR 555 concurrency
Cumberland	Millville	36.40	58.58	Route 47 (Second Street) – Vineland, Port Elizabeth	
Cumberland	Millville	36.48	58.71	CR 555 north (Third Street) – Vineland	Eastern end of CR 555 concurrency
Cumberland	Millville	37.84	60.90	Route 55 – Vineland, Wildwood, Cape May	Exit 24 on Route 55
Atlantic	No major junctions				
Cape May	Upper Township	50.31	80.97	CR 548 west (Tuckahoe Road) – Port Elizabeth	Eastern terminus of CR 548
Cape May	Upper Township	53.80	86.58	Route 50 / CR 557 – Mays Landing, Sea Isle City, Ocean City, Cape May	Eastern terminus
1.000 mi = 1.609 km; 1.000 km = 0.621 mi: Concurrency terminus
