= New Jersey Route 47 =

State highway in New Jersey, United States

Route 47
- Delsea Drive

Route information
- Maintained by NJDOT, Cape May County, and City of Wildwood
- Length: 75.20 mi (121.02 km)
- Existed: 1927–present
- Tourist routes: Bayshore Heritage Byway; Pine Barrens Byway

Major junctions
- South end: Atlantic Avenue in Wildwood
- G.S. Parkway in Middle Township; US 9 in Middle Township; Route 55 in Maurice River Township; Route 49 in Millville; Route 55 in Vineland; Route 56 in Vineland; US 40 in Franklin Township; US 322 in Glassboro; Route 55 in Deptford Township; I-295 in Westville; CR 551 in Westville
- North end: US 130 / CR 551 / CR 753 in Brooklawn

Location
- Country: United States
- State: New Jersey
- Counties: Cape May, Cumberland, Gloucester, Camden

Highway system
- New Jersey State Highway Routes; Interstate; US; State; Scenic Byways
| ← Route 46 | → Route 48 |
| ← CR 660 | CR 661 | → CR 662 |

Route 47 is a state highway in the southern part of New Jersey. It runs 75.20 miles (121.02 km) from Atlantic Avenue in Wildwood, Cape May County, north to U.S. Route 130 (US 130) in Brooklawn, Camden County. It is also referred to as Delsea Drive, as it connects the Delaware River near Brooklawn to the Atlantic Ocean (the sea) in Wildwood. This name was assigned by the New Jersey Legislature in 1933. The route runs through rural areas of Cape May and southern Cumberland counties as a two-lane road. Traffic jams along this portion of Route 47 are commonplace in the summer vacation season and can stretch for miles due to the missing southern section of Route 55, where all Jersey Shore-bound traffic enters the small two-lane road. North of here, the route runs through the cities of Millville and Vineland before entering Gloucester County, where it passes through more rural areas as well as Clayton and Glassboro. Past Glassboro, it heads through suburban areas in Washington and Deptford townships before running through Westville and Brooklawn. Route 47 is the longest signed state route in New Jersey.

What is now Route 47 was originally designated as part of pre-1927 Route 15 between Rio Grande in 1917 and as a branch of pre-1927 Route 20 between Millville and Westville in 1923. In 1927, Route 47 was designated to run from Tuckahoe to Brooklawn, following current Route 49 south of Millville. Meanwhile, current Route 47 was a part of Route 49 between South Dennis and Millville and Route S49 between Rio Grande and South Dennis. The latter was extended to Wildwood in 1938. Route 47 and Route 49 were shifted onto their current alignments south of Millville in 1953. Since then, Route 47 has seen a few improvements and modifications including realignment in Millville and the reconstruction of the intersection with Route 83 in Dennis Township.

== Route description ==
=== Cape May County ===
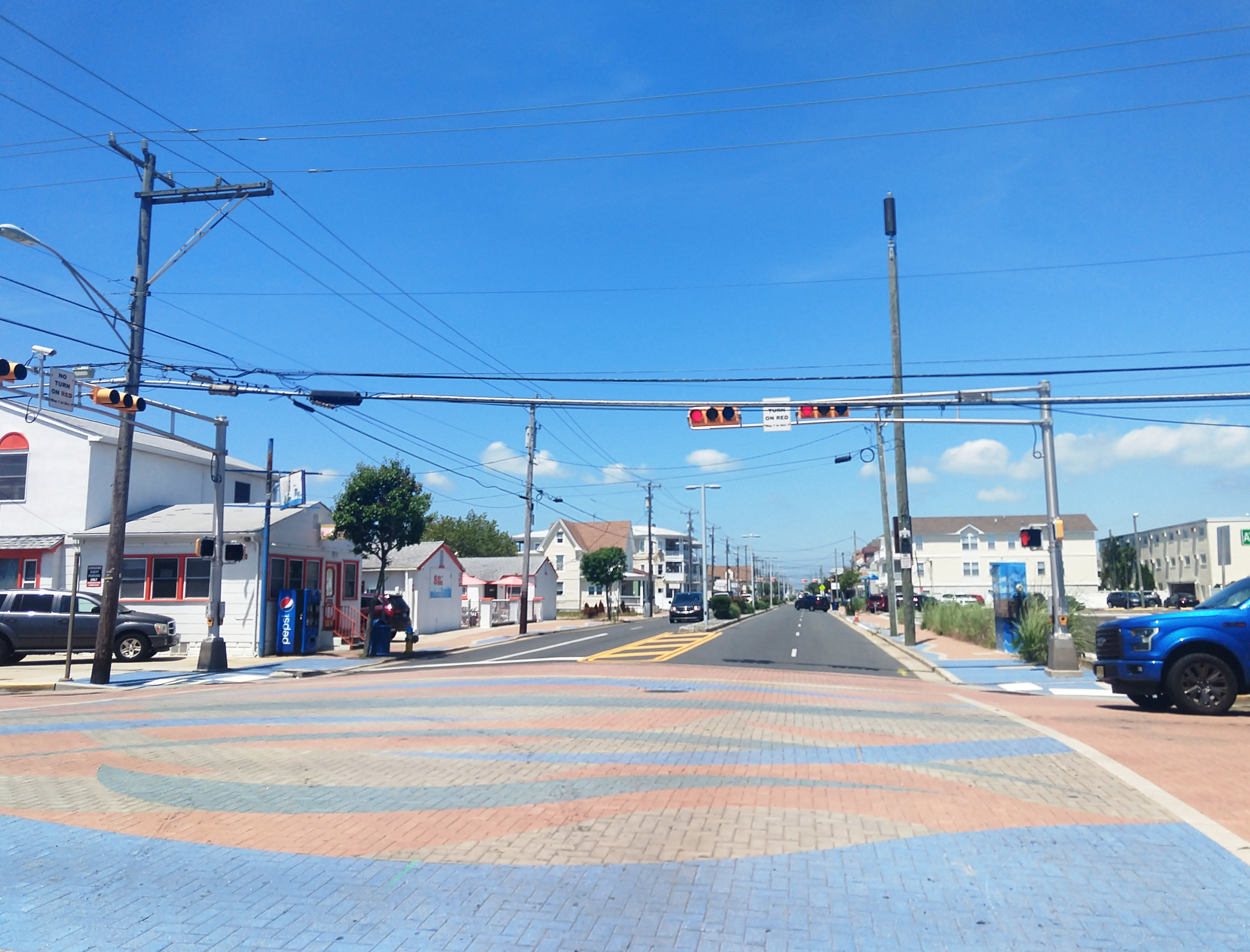
Southern terminus of Route 47 at Rio Grande Avenue and Atlantic Avenue in Wildwood

Route 47 begins at a traffic light with Atlantic Avenue in the Jersey Shore city of Wildwood, Cape May County, heading to the northwest on Rio Grande Avenue, a four-lane divided highway that is municipally-maintained. From this intersection, Rio Grande Avenue continues southeast a block to an intersection with Ocean Avenue near the Wildwood Boardwalk. The road passes through residential and commercial areas before crossing the intersection with Ocean Drive/New Jersey Avenue (CR 621), where it becomes a four-lane undivided county-maintained road that is designated as County Route 661 (CR 661). Upon crossing the intersection with Park Boulevard, the route gains a center left-turn lane and passes businesses, intersecting Susquehanna Avenue. Here, Route 47 becomes signed and maintained by the New Jersey Department of Transportation (NJDOT), turning into a divided highway again a short distance later at the intersection with West Rio Grande Boulevard (CR 624). At this intersection, the route enters Lower Township, becoming Wildwood Boulevard and crosses over the Grassy Sound via the George Redding Bridge, which is a drawbridge. The road turns more to the west-northwest and runs through wetlands with some homes to the south of the road, with the Wildwoods Welcome Center next to the southbound lanes; the welcome center is accessible via a direct southbound ramp and via a left turn northbound. Route 47 enters Middle Township and continues past more marshland as well as some marinas next to the Richardson Sound on the south side of the road. The route turns northwest again and comes to a partial cloverleaf interchange with the Garden State Parkway. Past this interchange, Route 47 heads into a commercial district in the Rio Grande section of Middle Township. At the intersection with 5th Street, the route becomes a three-lane undivided road with a center left-turn lane and continues to an intersection with Shore Road (US 9).

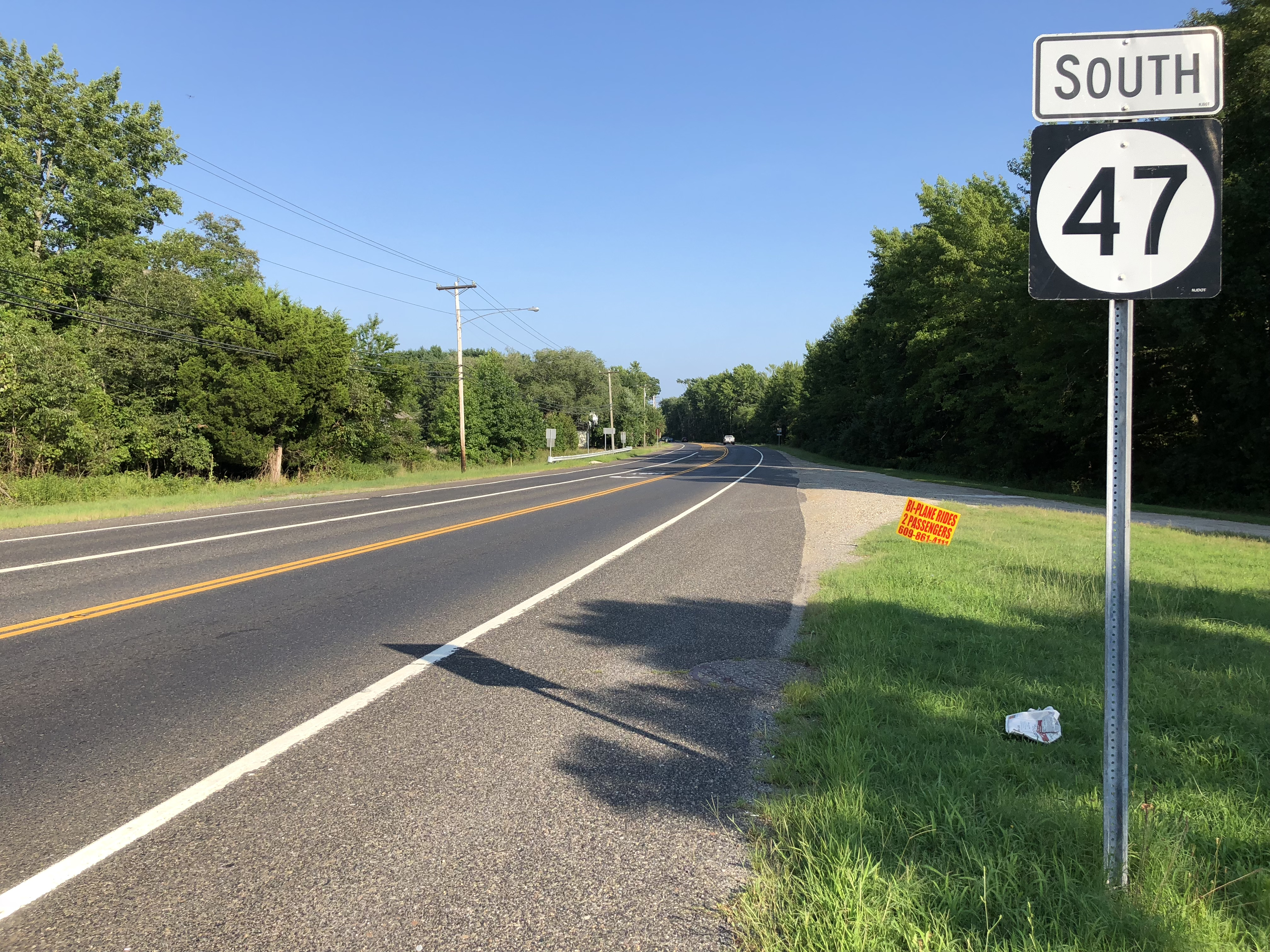
Route 47 southbound past the southern terminus of Route 347 in Dennis Township

Past the US 9 intersection, Route 47 becomes Delsea Drive and continues past more businesses, crossing the Cape May Seashore Lines railroad before intersecting Railroad Avenue (CR 626). Here, the route becomes a two-lane road and heads into more residential areas with some commercial establishments. At the intersection with Fulling Mill Road (CR 654), Route 47 turns north and leaves the Rio Grande area, heading into woods with some farm fields. It passes homes again and intersects Bayshore Road (CR 603) in Green Creek. From here, the road continues past homes with some areas of forests and farms. Route 47 comes to an intersection with Indian Trail Road (CR 618) which, along with Route 147, provides an alternate route to The Wildwoods. Past this intersection, the road passes more rural dwellings and enters the community of Dias Creek, where it intersects Dias Creek Road (CR 612). The route crosses over Bidwell Creek near wetlands and heads into forests. It reaches the residential community of Goshen, where there is an intersection with Goshen–Swainton Road (CR 615). Past Goshen, Route 47 turns northeast and heads through rural woods and farms with some homes and wetlands.

Upon crossing Sluice Creek, the route enters Dennis Township and heads into residential areas in the community of South Dennis. Here, the road intersects Court House–Dennisville Road (CR 657) and turns to the north. Route 47 briefly widens into a two-lane divided highway as it intersects Route 83. Past this intersection, the road heads through marshland and crosses over the Dennis Creek. It continues into Dennisville, where the route intersects Petersburg Road (CR 610) before turning west near Johnson Pond and intersecting Tyler Road (CR 611). Route 47 passes more homes before coming to the intersection with Washington Avenue (CR 557). Past the intersection with Washington Avenue (CR 557), the road runs through woodland before coming to the intersection with Route 347. Here, Route 47 turns to the west and passes a mix of residences, woods, and fields. It turns northwest and crosses over the East Creek before coming to an intersection with Paper Mill Road (CR 550 Spur). Past this intersection, the road intersects Old State Highway, a connector road to CR 550 Spur, before turning west into wooded areas.

=== Cumberland County ===
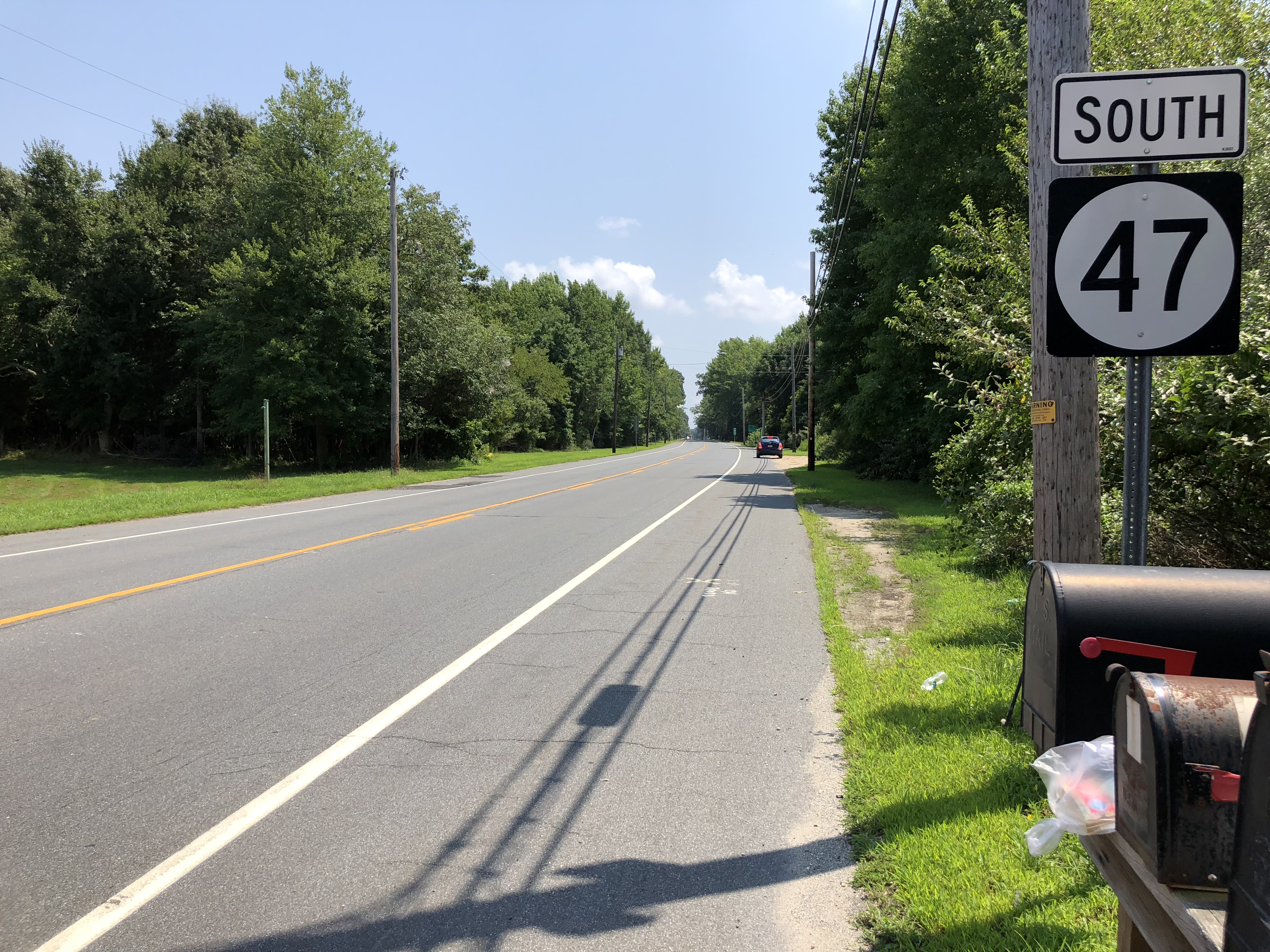
Route 47 southbound past Schooner Landing Road in Maurice River Township

Upon crossing over the West Creek, Route 47 enters Maurice River, Cumberland County, and continues west through more forests. It enters a mix of residences and woodland as it makes a turn to the north past the intersection with Hands Mill Road (CR 651). The route runs through more woods, with a clearing for Bayside State Prison to the east of the road. The road comes to an intersection with Leesburg–Belleplain Road (CR 550) and Station Road (CR 710) to the east of Leesburg and continues north. Route 47 reaches an intersection with Mauricetown Road (CR 670) in a commercial area prior to Route 347 merging back into the route. Here, Route 47 splits into a brief one-way pair; the northbound direction heads east on CR 670 and north on Route 347, and the southbound direction remains on Delsea Drive. From here, Route 47 continues north on Delsea Drive through forested areas with some homes before crossing over the Muskee Creek. It continues into the community of Port Elizabeth, where it meets the intersection with Broadway (CR 548). Just past this intersection, the route crosses the Manumuskin River and continues north through woodland with some development. The route intersects Route 55, where that route continues north along the road and Route 47 turns off at a jughandle. South of the intersection with Route 55, Route 47 is part of a major road linking the Philadelphia metropolitan area with the Jersey Shore resorts of Cape May County. During the summer months, it sees regular traffic jams from traffic coming off Route 55. A proposal to extend Route 55 south to Cape May County, on hold for decades due to environmental concerns, would relieve traffic along Route 47.

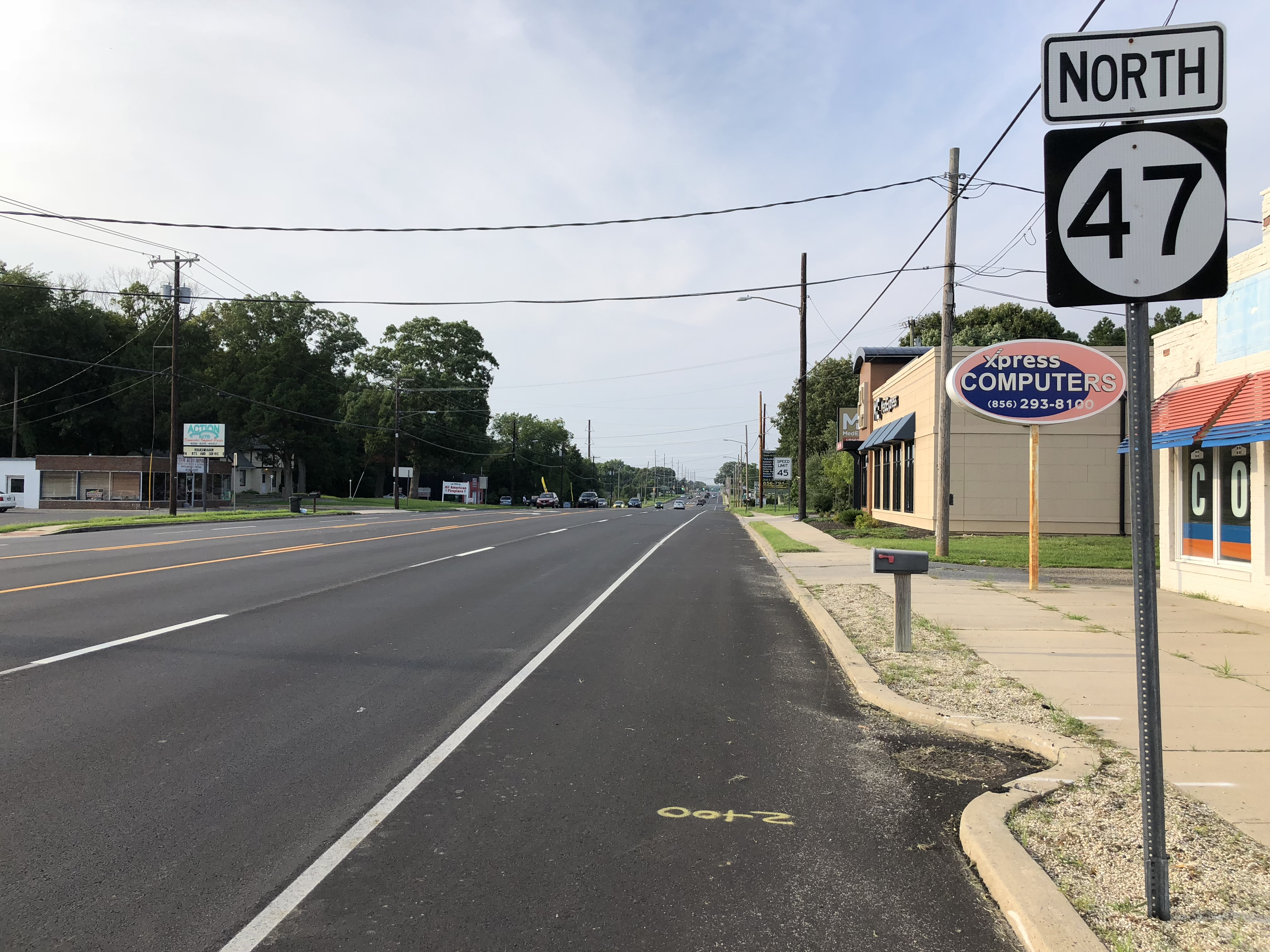
View north along Route 47 at College Drive in Vineland

From here, Route 47 continues through a mix of trees and residences, intersecting Schooner Landing Road, which provides access to the northbound direction of Route 55. Just past this intersection, the route crosses the Manantico Creek into Millville, where it becomes South 2nd Street, and continues past more woodland containing residences. As the route continues north, residential development increases along with commercial and industrial establishments. Route 47 reaches the commercial downtown of Millville, where it crosses the intersection with East Main Street (Route 49/CR 555) and becomes North 2nd Street. CR 555 parallels Route 47 a block to the east as the road crosses the Winchester and Western Railroad line and intersects East Broad Street (CR 552 Spur). Past this intersection, CR 555 heads farther to the east, and Route 47 crosses the Winchester and Western Railroad line a second time, passing a mix of residences, businesses, and industrial buildings. The road becomes three lanes with a center-left turn lane as it heads through commercial areas in the northern part of Millville. Upon intersecting High Street, the route widens to five lanes before entering Vineland, where the name becomes Delsea Drive again and comes to a partial cloverleaf interchange with Route 55.

Past this interchange, Route 47 passes the Cumberland Mall on the east side of the road as a six-lane divided highway. Past the mall, the route becomes a five-lane road with a center left-turn lane again and passes more commercial establishments in the southern part of Vineland, before heading into wooded residential areas with some farmland. It crosses the intersection with West Sherman Avenue (CR 552) and becomes a two-lane road, running through business areas with some homes. As Route 47 continues north through the city, it comes to an intersection with West Chestnut Avenue, where it gains a center left-turn lane. From here, it passes more commercial buildings before crossing the intersection with West Landis Avenue, which heads to the west as Route 56. Past this intersection, the road crosses a Winchester and Western Railroad line before intersecting West Park Avenue (CR 540). Route 47 continues north through a mix of dwellings and businesses in the northern part of Vineland, narrowing back into a two-lane road at the intersection with West Oak Road (CR 681). The road heads through predominantly residential areas as it comes to an intersection with West Garden Road (CR 674). Past this intersection, the route passes near Kroelinger Airport and continues through mostly rural inhabited areas with some businesses. It crosses the intersection with West Weymouth Road (CR 690) before passing through wooded sectors with some homes and farms.

=== Gloucester and Camden counties ===
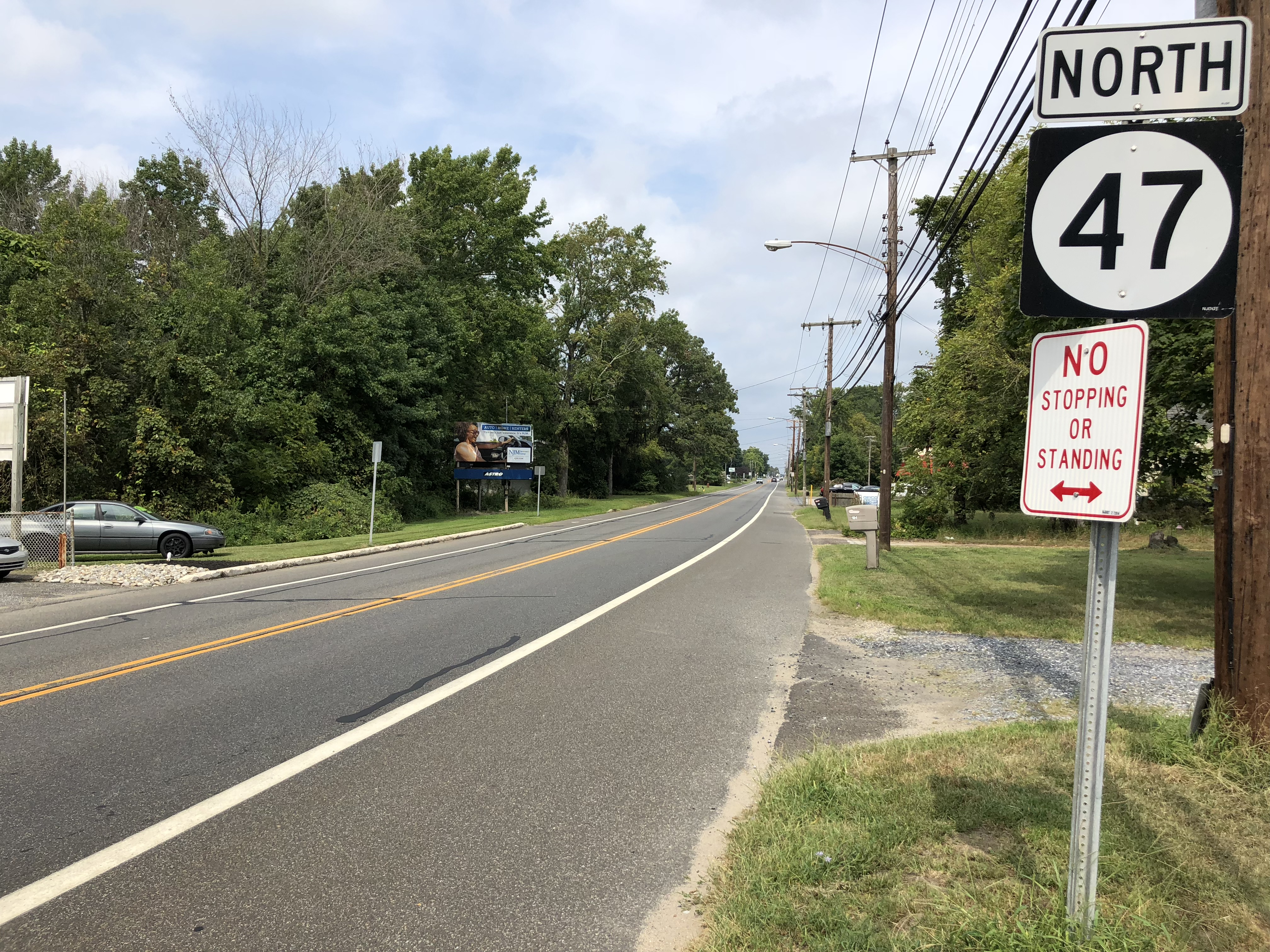
Route 47 northbound in Glassboro

Route 47 crosses into Franklin Township, Gloucester County, where it passes more farms, woods, and homes before coming to an intersection with Harding Highway (US 40) in the community of Malaga. Here, US 40 and Route 47 form a concurrency and head northeast through populated areas as a three-lane road with a center left-turn lane, crossing over the Conrail Shared Assets Operations' Vineland Secondary railroad line. Immediately after this crossing, US 40 splits from Route 47 by heading southeast on Harding Highway while Route 47 turns northwest to continue along Delsea Drive, a two-lane road. Route 47 leaves Malaga and passes through a mix of dwellings and businesses with some areas of farms and woods, running a short distance to the east of the railroad line. The road heads into more forested areas before it comes to an intersection with Williamstown Road (CR 612) in the residential and business community of Iona. Route 47 continues past homes and commercial establishments as it comes to a crossroads with Coles Mill Road/Swedesboro Road (CR 538), where it turns to the north. The route passes more development with some farmland before it enters Clayton.

Here, the road heads through residential areas with some commercial establishments, crossing the intersection with Academy Street (CR 610) in the center of town. As the road continues north, it heads through a mix of homes and farmland with a few commercial areas. Route 47 enters inhabited areas again as it crosses into Glassboro. The road continues north and enters business areas before heading into neighborhoods and coming to an intersection with High Street, which runs east as US 322 and west as CR 641. Here, US 322 joins Route 47. The two routes head through commercial areas before US 322 turns to the west on West Street. Past this intersection, Route 47 continues north as a three-lane road with a center left-turn lane, passing more buildings. The route intersects Donald Barger Boulevard (CR 553). Route 47 overlaps with that route which lasts until CR 553 turns north onto Woodbury Road. Along this concurrency, the road widens to five lanes as it passes a couple shopping centers. Past the concurrency, Route 47 runs north through suburban localities as a two-lane road and follows the border between Pitman to the west and Glassboro to the east and enters Washington Township at the crossing of Kressey Lake. In Washington Township, the road passes more populated areas as well as businesses. Route 47 runs to the east of Bethel Mill County Park before entering more residential areas, crossing the intersection with Lambs Road/Hurrfville–Grenloch Road (CR 635). The road passes through a mix of homes and commercial establishments with some farmland and wooded areas as it continues through more of Washington Township.

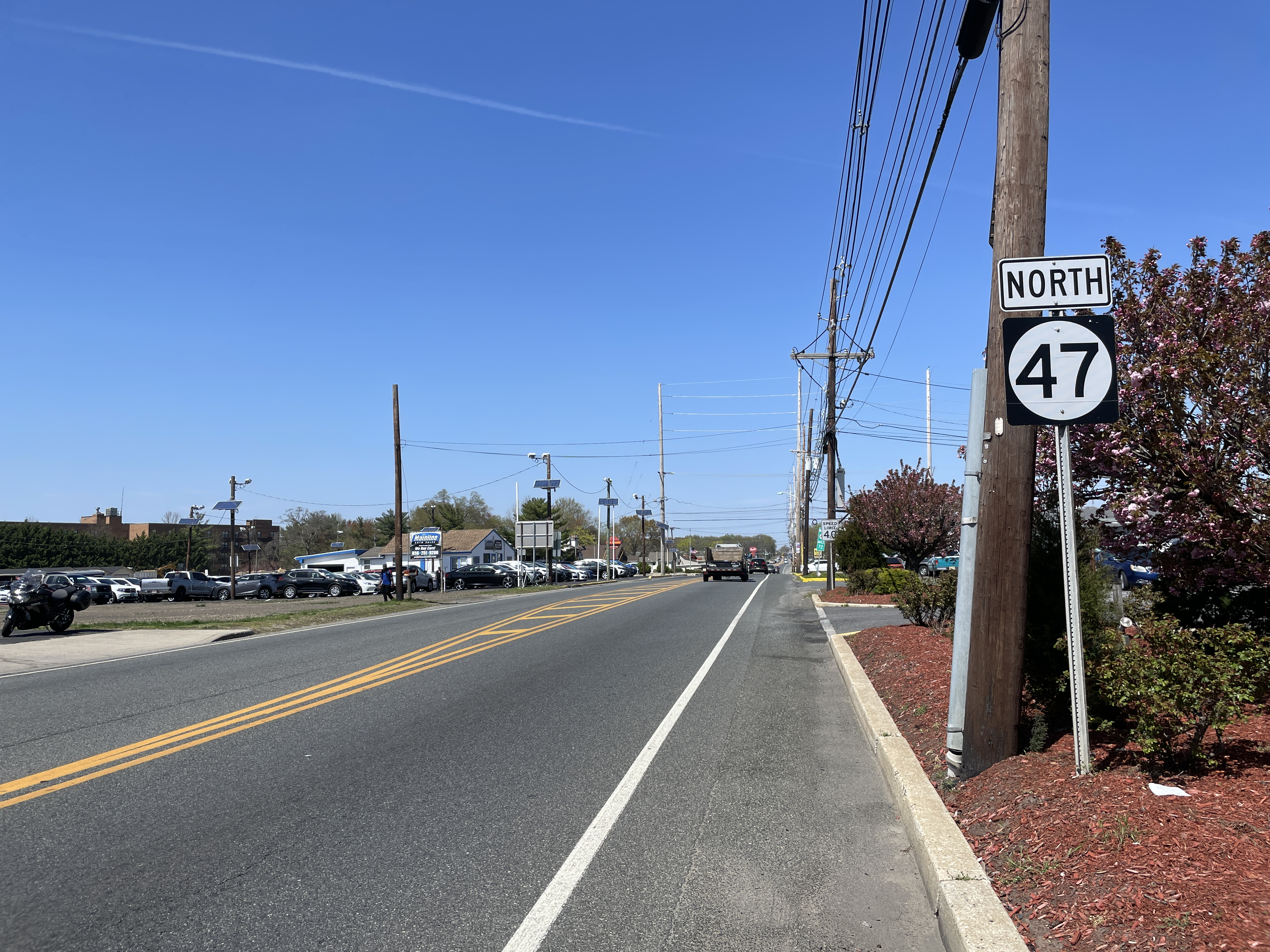
Route 47 northbound past CR 534 in Deptford Township

At the border with Deptford Township, New Jersey, Route 47 reaches an intersection known as Five Points. Here, the road meets the intersection with Hurrfville Road (Route 41), Blackwood–Barnsboro Road (CR 603), and Egg Harbor Road (CR 630). Route 47 turns northwest as this intersection and runs through wooded areas with some dwellings, while Route 55 intersects the route at a cloverleaf interchange a short distance later. Past this interchange, the road continues through wooded inhabited areas, eventually turning due north. It comes to an intersection with Cooper Street (CR 534) as the route heads past more suburban homes along with businesses. Past this intersection, Route 47 passes businesses before crossing over the New Jersey Turnpike without an interchange. From here, it heads through more inhabited areas before entering Westville. Upon entering Westville, the route has a partial cloverleaf interchange with Interstate 295 (I-295). Past this interchange, the road runs through neighborhoods, intersecting Almonesson Road (CR 621) and Broadway (CR 551). The latter forms a concurrency with Route 47, and these two routes run northeast through commercial areas as a four-lane undivided road, crossing the Big Timber Creek into Brooklawn, Camden County. Here, it comes to a traffic circle with US 130 and Creek Road (CR 753), where Route 47 ends and CR 551 continues into Camden, forming a brief concurrency with US 130 and continuing northeast on Broadway.

== History ==
Route S49 (1927-1953)

The portion of Route 47 south of Port Elizabeth was a part of the Cohanseu trail, a Lenape trail running from Swedesboro to Cape May. North of Port Elizabeth, the road was maintained by several turnpikes: the Westville and Glassboro Turnpike, chartered in 1852, following Tanyard Road and Woodbury Road south of New Sharon; the Glassboro and Malaga Turnpike, chartered in 1851; the Millville and Malaga Turnpike, chartered in 1852; and the Port Elizabeth and Millville Turnpike, chartered in 1852. The modern road north of Port Elizabeth and from Dennisville to Goshen was incorporated into the Cape May Way, an auto trail running from Camden to Cape May.

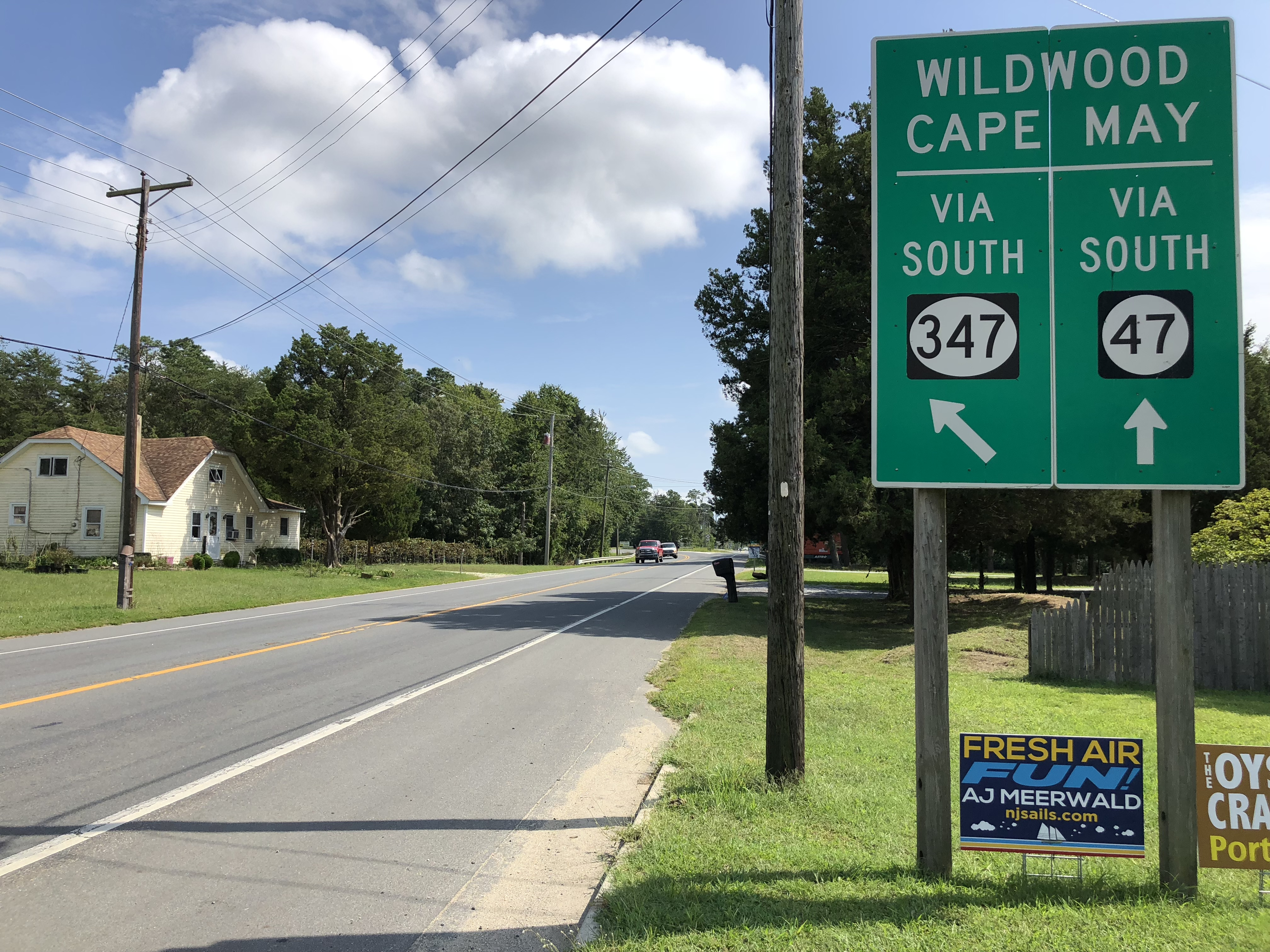
Route 47 southbound approaching split with Route 347 in Maurice River Township

The road was originally designated as a segment of pre-1927 Route 15 between Rio Grande and Millville in 1917, and as one of two branches of pre-1927 Route 20 between Millville and Westville in 1923. In the 1927 New Jersey state highway renumbering, Route 47 was legislated to run from Route 50 in Tuckahoe to Brooklawn, following present-day Route 49 between Tuckahoe and Millville and its current alignment north of Millville. Meanwhile, the present-day alignment of Route 47 between the current intersection with Route 83 in South Dennis and Millville was designated a part of Route 49 while the current alignment between South Dennis and US 9/Route 4 in Rio Grande became Route S49, a spur of Route 49. In 1933, the New Jersey Legislature named Route 47 as "Delsea Drive" after a reporter for the Woodbury Times joked how the road connected the Delaware River to the Atlantic Sea. Route S49 was extended from Rio Grande to Park Boulevard in Wildwood in 1938. In the 1953 New Jersey state highway renumbering, Route 47 and Route 49 switched alignments south and east of Millville, and Route 47 replaced Route S49 south to Wildwood.

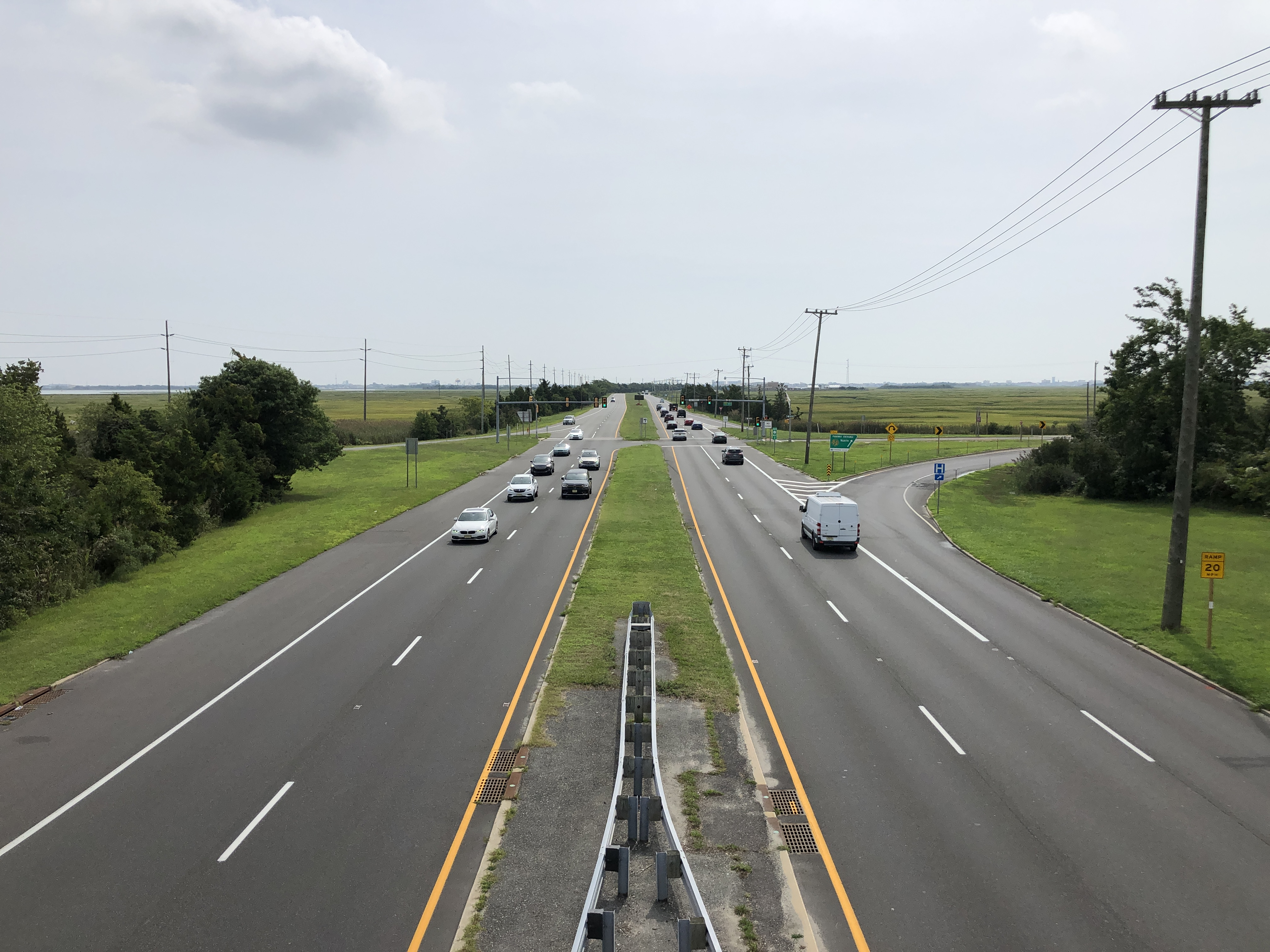
Route 47 southbound at the Garden State Parkway interchange in Middle Township

By the 1980s, Route 47 was moved from High Street to North 2nd Street through the northern part of Millville. An alternate route for Route 47 was eventually created to the east along county routes in Cape May and Cumberland counties; this eventually became Route 347 by the 1990s.

In the 2000s, Rio Grande Avenue in Wildwood received improvements to make it reminisce the doo wop atmosphere for which the beach resort is known.

The Route 47 bridge over Dennis Creek in Dennis Township and the intersection with Route 83 received improvements that were completed in July 2007. The bridge over the creek was structurally deficient and in need of replacing. The job was completed with wider shoulders and a wider sidewalk on the new bridge. The intersection between Route 47 and Route 83 was also realigned and had signals installed.

In 2018, a $10 million construction project began to improve the section of Route 47 along Rio Grande Avenue at the entrance to Wildwood, which added a center left-turn lane, raised the road by 30 inches (76 cm), and added new lighting and signs. The project was completed in 2020. A dedication ceremony marking the completion of the project was held on July 1, 2020, with local officials in attendance. As part of the project, Rio Grande Avenue leading into Wildwood was to be renamed to Beach Ball Boulevard following a contest to rename the roadway. However, on July 10, 2020, it was announced that the Wildwood city commissioners decided to keep the road name as Rio Grande Avenue after receiving input from residents that the road name should not change.

== Major intersections ==
| County | Location | mi | km | Destinations | Notes |
|---|---|---|---|---|---|
| Cape May | Wildwood | 0.00 | 0.00 | Atlantic Avenue | Southern terminus |
| Cape May | Wildwood | 0.26 | 0.42 | CR 621 / Ocean Drive (New Jersey Avenue) | |
| Cape May | Middle Township | 3.08– 3.15 | 4.96– 5.07 | G.S. Parkway to A.C. Expressway | Exit 4 on the Garden State Parkway |
| Cape May | Middle Township | 3.76 | 6.05 | US 9 (Shore Road) – Cape May, Cape May Court House | |
| Cape May | Dennis Township | 17.54 | 28.23 | Route 83 east – Clermont, Sea Isle City, Avalon | Western terminus of Route 83 |
| Cape May | Dennis Township | 20.20 | 32.51 | CR 557 north (Washington Avenue) – Woodbine | Southern terminus of CR 557 |
| Cape May | Dennis Township | 20.91 | 33.65 | Route 347 north – Millville, Camden | Southern terminus of Route 347 |
| Cape May | Dennis Township | 23.44 | 37.72 | CR 550 Spur east (Paper Mill Road) | Western terminus of CR 550 Spur |
| Cumberland | Maurice River Township | 29.53 | 47.52 | CR 550 east (Leesburg–Belleplain Road) – Belleplain | Western terminus of CR 550 |
| Cumberland | Maurice River Township | 31.95 | 51.42 | Route 347 south – Wildwood, Cape May | Northern terminus of Route 347 |
| Cumberland | Maurice River Township | 33.83 | 54.44 | CR 548 east (Broadway) – Tuckahoe | Western terminus of CR 548 |
| Cumberland | Maurice River Township | 35.08 | 56.46 | Route 55 north – Vineland, Deptford Township | Southern terminus of Route 55 |
| Cumberland | Millville | 40.20 | 64.70 | Route 49 / CR 555 (East Main Street) | |
| Cumberland | Millville | 40.66 | 65.44 | CR 552 Spur east (East Broad Street) | Western terminus of CR 552 Spur |
| Cumberland | Vineland | 42.47– 42.50 | 68.35– 68.40 | Route 55 – Malaga, Cape May, Wildwood | Exit 27 on Route 55 |
| Cumberland | Vineland | 43.75 | 70.41 | CR 552 (West Sherman Avenue) to Route 55 – Bridgeton, Milmay | |
| Cumberland | Vineland | 46.55 | 74.91 | Route 56 west (West Landis Avenue) to Route 55 | Eastern terminus of Route 56 |
| Cumberland | Vineland | 46.9 | 75.5 | CR 540 (West Park Avenue) – Centerton, Richland | |
| Gloucester | Franklin Township | 52.52 | 84.52 | US 40 west (Harding Highway) to Route 55 – Elmer, Delaware Memorial Bridge | Southern end of US 40 concurrency |
| Gloucester | Franklin Township | 53.03 | 85.34 | US 40 east (Harding Highway) to A.C. Expressway – Atlantic City | Northern end of US 40 concurrency |
| Gloucester | Franklin Township | 56.53 | 90.98 | CR 538 (Coles Mill Road/Swedesboro Road) – Monroeville, Cecil | |
| Gloucester | Glassboro | 62.46 | 100.52 | US 322 east (High Street) to A.C. Expressway – Atlantic City | Southern end of US 322 concurrency |
| Gloucester | Glassboro | 62.84 | 101.13 | US 322 west (West Street) to N.J. Turnpike – Rowan University, Delaware Memorial Bridge | Northern end of US 322 concurrency |
| Gloucester | Glassboro | 63.82 | 102.71 | CR 553 south (Donald Barger Boulevard) to CR 553 Alt. – Mantua Township, New Jersey | Southern end of CR 553 concurrency |
| Gloucester | Glassboro | 64.12 | 103.19 | CR 553 north (Woodbury Road) – Pitman, Woodbury | Northern end of CR 553 concurrency |
| Gloucester | Deptford Township | 68.36 | 110.01 | Route 41 north (Hurffville Road) – Runnemede | Southern terminus of Route 41 |
| Gloucester | Deptford Township | 69.36 | 111.62 | Route 55 – Glassboro, Bellmawr | Exit 56 on Route 55 |
| Gloucester | Deptford Township | 71.90 | 115.71 | CR 534 (Cooper Street) – Clementon | |
| Gloucester | Westville | 74.01 | 119.11 | I-295 north to I-76 – Walt Whitman Bridge | Access to northbound I-295 and access from southbound I-295; exit 25 southbound on I-295 |
| Gloucester | Westville | 74.90 | 120.54 | CR 551 south (Broadway) | Southern end of CR 551 concurrency |
| Camden | Brooklawn | 75.20 | 121.02 | US 130 / CR 551 north | Northern end of CR 551 concurrency; Brooklawn East Circle; northern terminus |
1.000 mi = 1.609 km; 1.000 km = 0.621 mi: Concurrency terminus; Incomplete access

== See also ==
- Glassboro–Camden Line, a planned light rail line paralleling Route 47 from Brooklawn to Glassboro
