= South Dennis =

South Dennis may refer to:

- South Dennis, Massachusetts
- South Dennis, New Jersey
