= Clermont, New Jersey =

Clermont, New Jersey may refer to:

- Clermont, Burlington County, New Jersey
- Clermont, Cape May County, New Jersey
