= New Jersey Route 83 =

State highway in Cape May County, New Jersey, US

Route 83
- Trooper Bertram T. Zimmerman III Memorial Highway
- Route 83 shown in red

Route information
- Maintained by NJDOT
- Length: 3.81 mi (6.13 km)
- Existed: January 1, 1953–present

Major junctions
- West end: Route 47 in Dennis Township
- East end: US 9 in Dennis Township

Location
- Country: United States
- State: New Jersey
- Counties: Cape May

Highway system
- New Jersey State Highway Routes; Interstate; US; State; Scenic Byways
← Route 82	→ Route 84

Route 83 is a state highway in the U.S. state of New Jersey. It is completely within Dennis Township, New Jersey, running 3.81 mi (6.13 km) from an intersection with Route 47 east to an intersection with U.S. Route 9 (US 9). The route, which passes through woodland and some residential development, is also known as the Trooper Bertram T. Zimmerman III Memorial Highway in honor of a New Jersey State Police officer who was killed along Route 83 in 2004 while responding to an armed robbery.

Between 1927 and 1953, Route 83 was a part of Route 49, which originally ran south of Millville along Route 47 between Millville and South Dennis and along the entire length of Route 83. In 1953, the route became Route 83 when Route 49 was realigned to follow what was then Route 47 between Millville and Tuckahoe and Route 47 was aligned to follow Route S49 between South Dennis and Wildwood. In 2007, the state completed reconstruction of the intersection with Route 47 to include a traffic signal. A school bus accident has prompted the New Jersey Department of Transportation (NJDOT) to install a traffic signal at the Y intersection of Route 83 and US 9.

== Route description ==
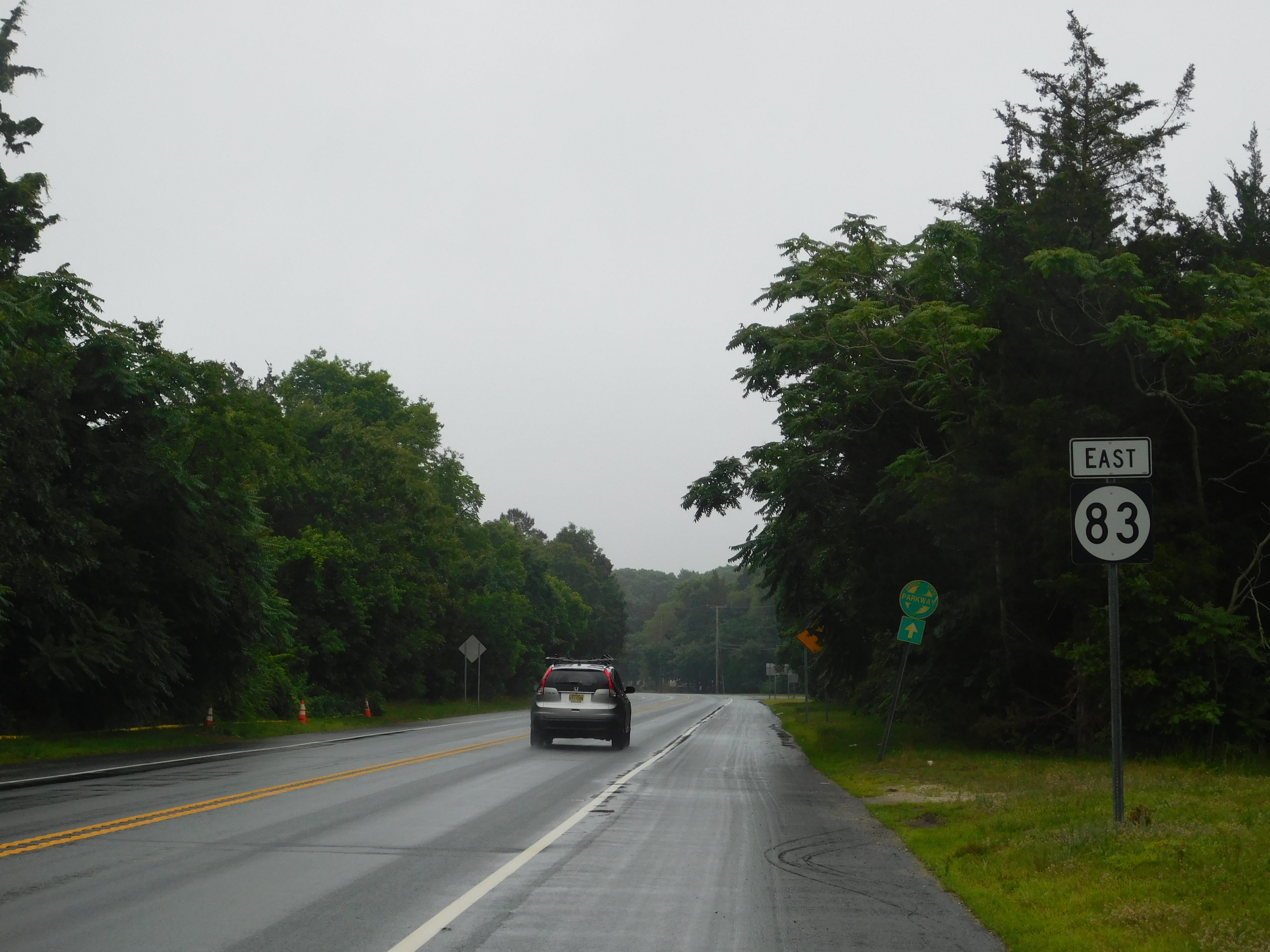
Route 83 in Dennis Township

Route 83 begins at a traffic light with Route 47 in South Dennis, heading to the east on a four-lane divided highway. The route crosses over the Cape May Seashore Lines railroad line and narrows to a two-lane undivided highway. After this bridge, it intersects West Avenue and then crosses over County Route 628 (Dennisville Road/School House Road). Route 83 then intersects County Road, which heads west to parallel the route to the south. It later crosses Gravel Hole Road, which provides access to County Route 657 (Court House-Dennisville Road). Past that intersection, Route 83 continues to the east through a mix of residential development and woodland. It passes under a set of power lines and comes to an intersection with County Route 608 (Kings Highway). The route continues east to its eastern terminus at a signalized intersection with US 9 in Clermont.

Route 83 is a major route that provides access to the Jersey Shore resorts of Sea Isle City and Avalon from Route 47. It also serves as part of an evacuation route for Cape May County that feeds into Route 47 to provide access to inland areas in the event of a hurricane.

== History ==
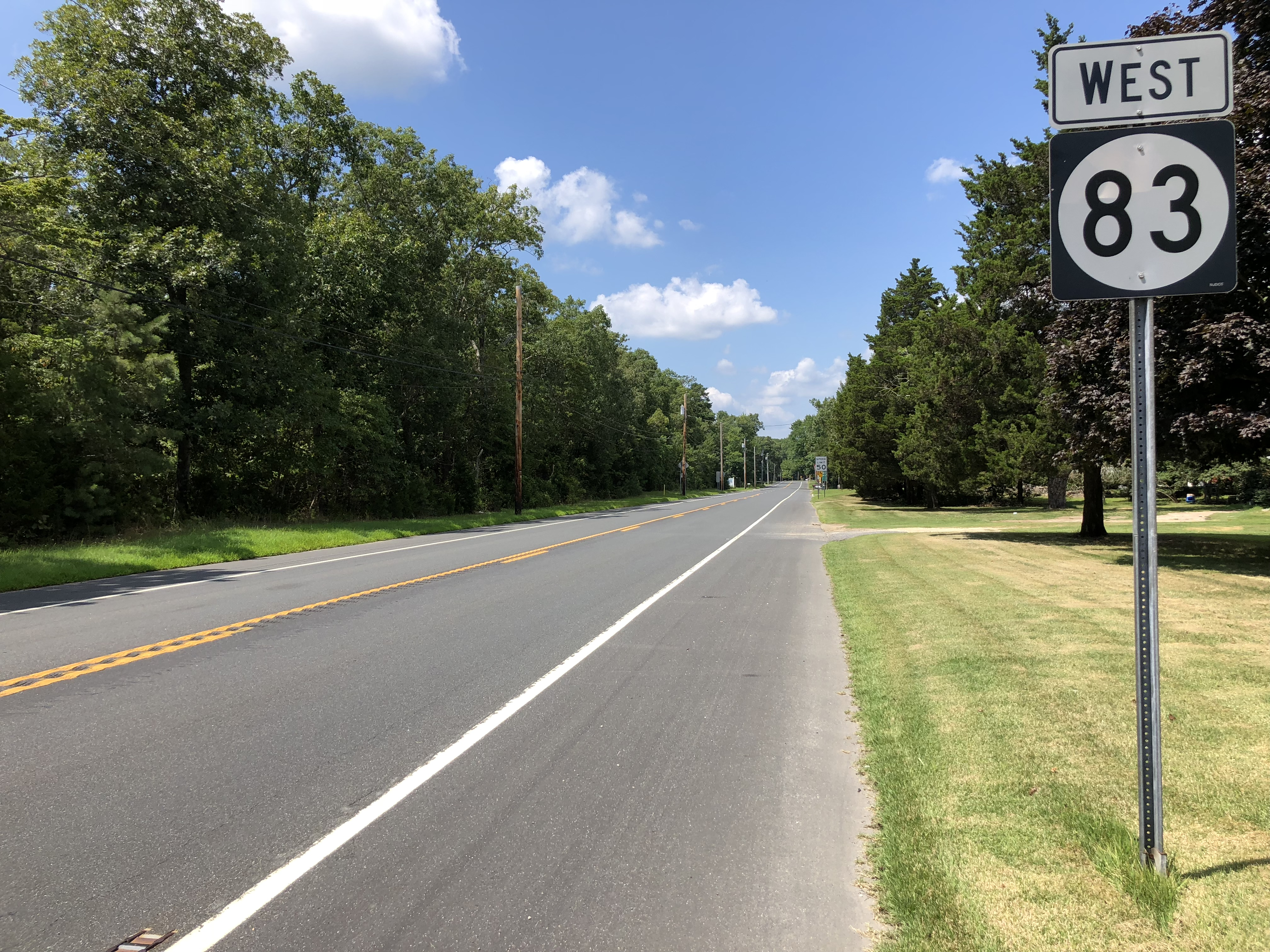
View west along Route 83 at CR 608 in Dennis Township

Route 83 was originally legislated by the Laws of 1927, Chapter 319 as a part of Route 49, which was to run from Route 4 (now US 9) in Ocean View to Route 44 in Salem. In 1940, a bridge was built over the Pennsylvania-Reading Seashore Lines railroad tracks in South Dennis. In the 1953 New Jersey state highway renumbering, Route 49 was realigned to head along Route 47 from Millville to Tuckahoe, Route 47 was realigned to head along Route 49 between Millville and South Dennis and Route S49 from South Dennis and Wildwood, and Route 83 was created along the former alignment of Route 49 between South Dennis and Clermont.

On December 12, 2004, Route 83 was dedicated as the Trooper Bertram T. Zimmerman III Memorial Highway in honor of a New Jersey State Police trooper who was killed on the route earlier in the year while responding to an armed robbery. In the 2000s, plans were made to improve the intersections at both termini of Route 83. The intersection with Route 47 saw realignment and the installation of a traffic light, along with improvements to Route 47, that cost $6.7 million and was completed in July 2007. In 2006, reconstruction of the Y intersection of US 9 and Route 83 to a T intersection and a new traffic light was planned following a school bus accident. The reconfigured intersection was completed on June 10, 2008.

== Major intersections ==
The entire route is in Dennis Township, Cape May County.

mi	km	Destinations	Notes
0.00	0.00	Route 47 (Delsea Drive) – Goshen, Wildwood, Cape May, Millville, Camden	Western terminus
3.81	6.13	US 9 (Shore Road) – Atlantic City, Cape May	Eastern terminus
1.000 mi = 1.609 km; 1.000 km = 0.621 mi
