= County Route 548 (New Jersey) =

County highway in New Jersey, U.S.

County Route 548
- CR 548 highlighted in red

Route information
- Length: 9.18 mi (14.77 km)
- Tourist routes: Pine Barrens Byway

Major junctions
- West end: Route 47 in Maurice River Township
- East end: Route 49 in Upper Township

Location
- Country: United States
- State: New Jersey
- Counties: Cumberland, Cape May

Highway system
- County routes in New Jersey; 500-series routes
← CR 547	→ CR 549

County Route 548 (CR 548) is a county highway in the U.S. state of New Jersey. The highway extends 9.18 miles (14.77 km) from Delsea Drive (Route 47 in Maurice River Township to Route 49 in Upper Township.

== Route description ==
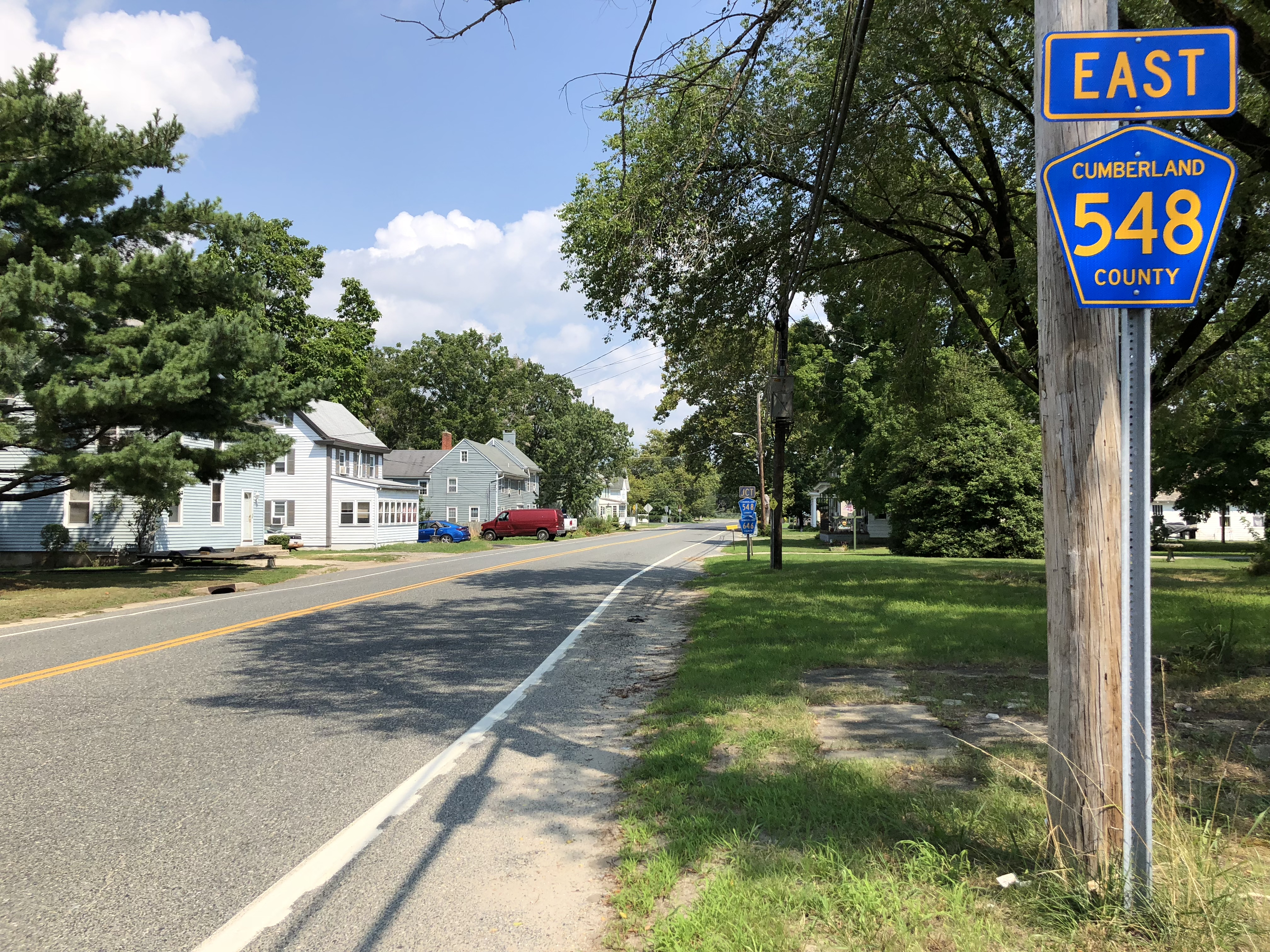
View east at the west end of CR 548 at Route 47 in Maurice River Township

CR 548 begins at an intersection with Route 47 in the community of Port Elizabeth in Maurice River Township, Cumberland County, heading east on two-lane undivided Broadway Avenue. The road passes homes before crossing CR 648 and becoming Weatherby Road. The route crosses an abandoned railroad line as it leaves Port Elizabeth and passes a patch of farmland before entering dense forests. CR 548 continues through the forests for several more miles as it enters Cape May County, briefly running through Dennis Township before crossing into Upper Township and passing through the Belleplain State Forest. CR 548 passes some farms and reaches an intersection with CR 605 before it comes to its eastern terminus at Route 49.

== History ==
The entire route was initially part of the Cape May Way, an auto trail running from Camden to Cape May. County Route 548 used to continue farther west, following New Jersey Route 47 and Cumberland County Routes 670 and 649 to County Route 553 in Port Norris.

== Major intersections ==
County	Location	mi	km	Destinations	Notes
Cumberland	Maurice River Township	0.00	0.00	Route 47 (Delsea Drive) – Wildwood, Cape May, Millville, Camden	
Cape May	Upper Township	9.18	14.77	Route 49 – Millville, Tuckahoe	
1.000 mi = 1.609 km; 1.000 km = 0.621 mi
