= New Jersey Route 15 (pre-1927) =

Pre-1927 Route 15 was a route in New Jersey that ran from Bridgeton east to Rio Grande, existing between 1917 and 1927. Today, it is part of the following routes:

- New Jersey Route 49
- New Jersey Route 47
