= List of New Jersey Scenic Byways =

New Jersey Scenic Byways

Highway names
- Interstates: Interstate X (I-X)
- US Highways: U.S. Route X (US X)
- State: Route X
- County routes: County Route X (CR X)

System links
- New Jersey State Highway Routes; Interstate; US; State; Scenic Byways

The New Jersey Scenic Byways system consists of roads in the U.S. state of New Jersey that have been recognized for their historical or natural qualities.

== List of byways ==
There are currently eight scenic byways in the state of New Jersey:

=== Bayshore Heritage Byway ===
Bayshore Heritage Byway
- Location: Cape May Point–Mannington Township
- Length: 122 mi (196 km)

The Bayshore Heritage Byway runs along the Delaware Bay and Delaware River in Cape May, Cumberland, and Salem counties, providing access to natural and historical sites. The byway begins in Cape May Point, Cape May County, following CR 629, CR 606, CR 626, Route 162, CR 626, and Route 47. In Cumberland County, the Bayshore Heritage Byway continues along Route 47, CR 616 (with a spur along East Point Road that serves the East Point Light), Menhaden Road, River Road, CR 616, Route 47, CR 670, CR 744, CR 676, CR 633, CR 649, CR 553 (with spurs along CR 631 to Bivalve and along CR 656 and CR 637 to Fortescue), CR 609, Route 49, Fayette Street, CR 650, CR 607, and CR 623 (with a spur along CR 642 and Bayside Road to the Bayside Tract Preservation Site). In Salem County, the byway follows CR 623, CR 658, CR 624, CR 625, CR 661, Grieves Parkway, and South Front Street to Route 49 in Salem. At this point, a spur heads along Route 49, Freas Road, Supawna Road, Route 49, CR 632, and CR 630 to Fort Mott State Park. From Salem, the mainline continues along Route 49, Route 45, and CR 540 to its northern terminus in Mannington Township.

=== Delaware River Scenic Byway ===
Delaware River Scenic Byway
- Location: Trenton–Frenchtown
- Length: 34 mi (55 km)

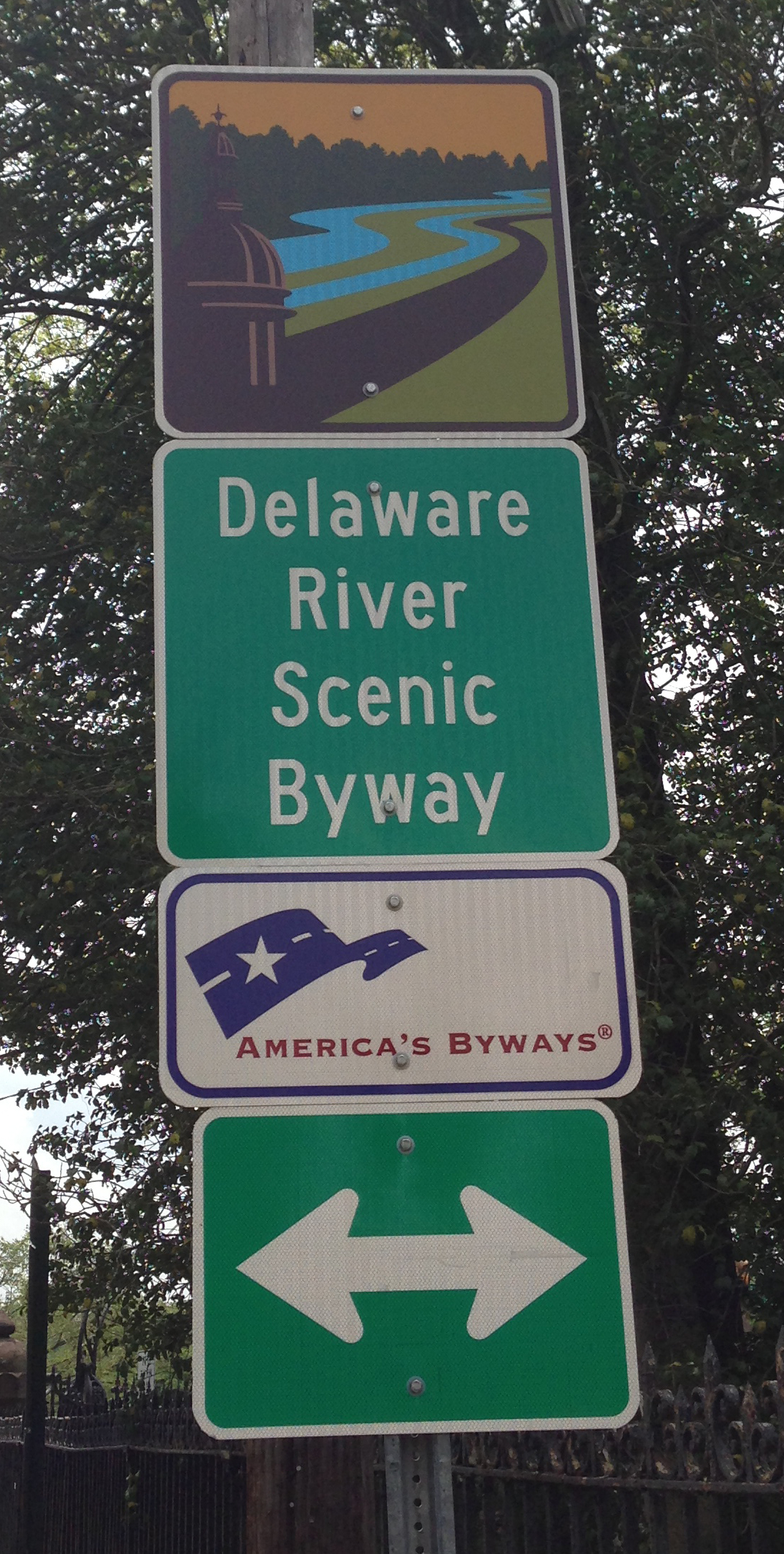
Signage for the Delaware River Scenic Byway

The Delaware River Scenic Byway follows Route 29 along the Delaware River between Trenton and Frenchtown. It provides scenic views of the Delaware River and passes through Washington Crossing State Park, Titusville, Lambertville, Stockton, and Raven Rock. This byway is also part of the national program.

=== Millstone Valley Scenic Byway ===
Millstone Valley Scenic Byway
- Location: Kingston–Millstone
- Length: 27.5 mi (44.3 km)

The Millstone Valley Scenic Byway is a 25-mile (40 km) historic scenic route located in the Millstone River Valley which lies in north central New Jersey. The byway offers a glimpse into the past where skirmishes between the local militia and British troops played a key role in the American Revolutionary War. This byway has been designated by the National Scenic Byways Program of the Federal Highway Administration as of 2009.

The route travels along CR 605 (River Road) in Princeton, Montgomery Township, and Rocky Hill, Montgomery Road in Rocky Hill and Montgomery Township, and CR 533 along the west bank of the Millstone River. It travels along CR 603 (Kingston-Rocky Hill Road) and Canal Road on the east side of the Delaware and Raritan Canal. The route loops back on the south side at Route 27 in Princeton and Kingston and connects near the northern end via CR 514 between Millstone and East Millstone.

Attractions along the route include the Delaware and Raritan Canal State Park, the relocated Rockingham site in Kingston, a section of Franklin Township, Somerset County, and the 1860 House on Montgomery Road near Rocky Hill. The Kingston Village Historic District and the Kingston Mill Historic District are both located in the historic area of Kingston.

=== Henry Hudson Drive ===
Henry Hudson Drive
- Location: Edgewater-Alpine
- Length: 8 mi (13 km)

Henry Hudson Drive is a scenic bypass of the nearby Palisades Parkway, U.S. 9W, and Hudson Terrace (CR 505). It runs along the bottom of the Palisades Cliffs on the western bank of the Hudson River, and also goes underneath the George Washington Bridge. While it is much smaller and isolated than nearby roads, it still provides a scenic view of New York on the other side of the river, and connects to many picnic areas and parks.

=== Palisades Scenic Byway ===
Palisades Scenic Byway
- Location: Fort Lee–Alpine
- Length: 12 mi (19 km)

The Palisades Scenic Byway follows the Palisades Interstate Parkway between Fort Lee and the New York border, running along the New Jersey Palisades on the Hudson River in Bergen County and offering scenic overlooks.

=== Pine Barrens Byway ===
Pine Barrens Byway
- Location: Tuckerton–Estell Manor
- Length: 130 mi (210 km)

The Pine Barrens Byway consists of three routes that run through the Pine Barrens in southern New Jersey. The northern route of the byway begins in Tuckerton in Ocean County and follows US 9 and Stage Road into Burlington County, where it continues along CR 653 and CR 542 to Green Bank. Here, the Pine Barrens Byway splits into a longer northern loop and a shorter northern loop. The longer northern loop follows CR 542 through Batsto into Mullica Township, Atlantic County. The shorter northern loop follows CR 563 into Mullica Township. The first leg of the northern loop begins at CR 542 in Mullica Township, following CR 643 and CR 612 to CR 563. From here, the final leg of the northern loop follows CR 563, CR 624, Mill Street, Riverside Drive, CR 575, CR 610, US 9, the Garden State Parkway into Burlington County, and US 9 back to Tuckerton, Ocean County.

The central connector of the Pine Barrens Byway begins at CR 542 in Mullica Township, Atlantic County and follows CR 542, CR 658, CR 623, CR 559, CR 616, CR 559, US 40/Route 50, Route 50, and CR 611 to Corbin City.

The southern route of the byway begins in Corbin City, Atlantic County and follows CR 611 and Route 50 into Tuckahoe, Cape May County. From here, the byway follows Route 49, CR 632, and Route 49 to an intersection with CR 548, where it splits into a longer southern loop and a shorter southern loop. The longer southern loop follows CR 548 into Cumberland County, where it heads south on Route 47 back into Cape May County. The byway continues along Route 47, CR 610, CR 550, CR 557, CR 550, and CR 605 back to CR 548. The shorter southern loop follows Route 49 into Estell Manor, Atlantic County and continues along Head of River Road and Aetna Drive to CR 611.

=== Upper Freehold Historic Farmland Byway ===
Upper Freehold Historic Farmland Byway
- Location: Allentown–Walnford
- Length: 24 mi (39 km)

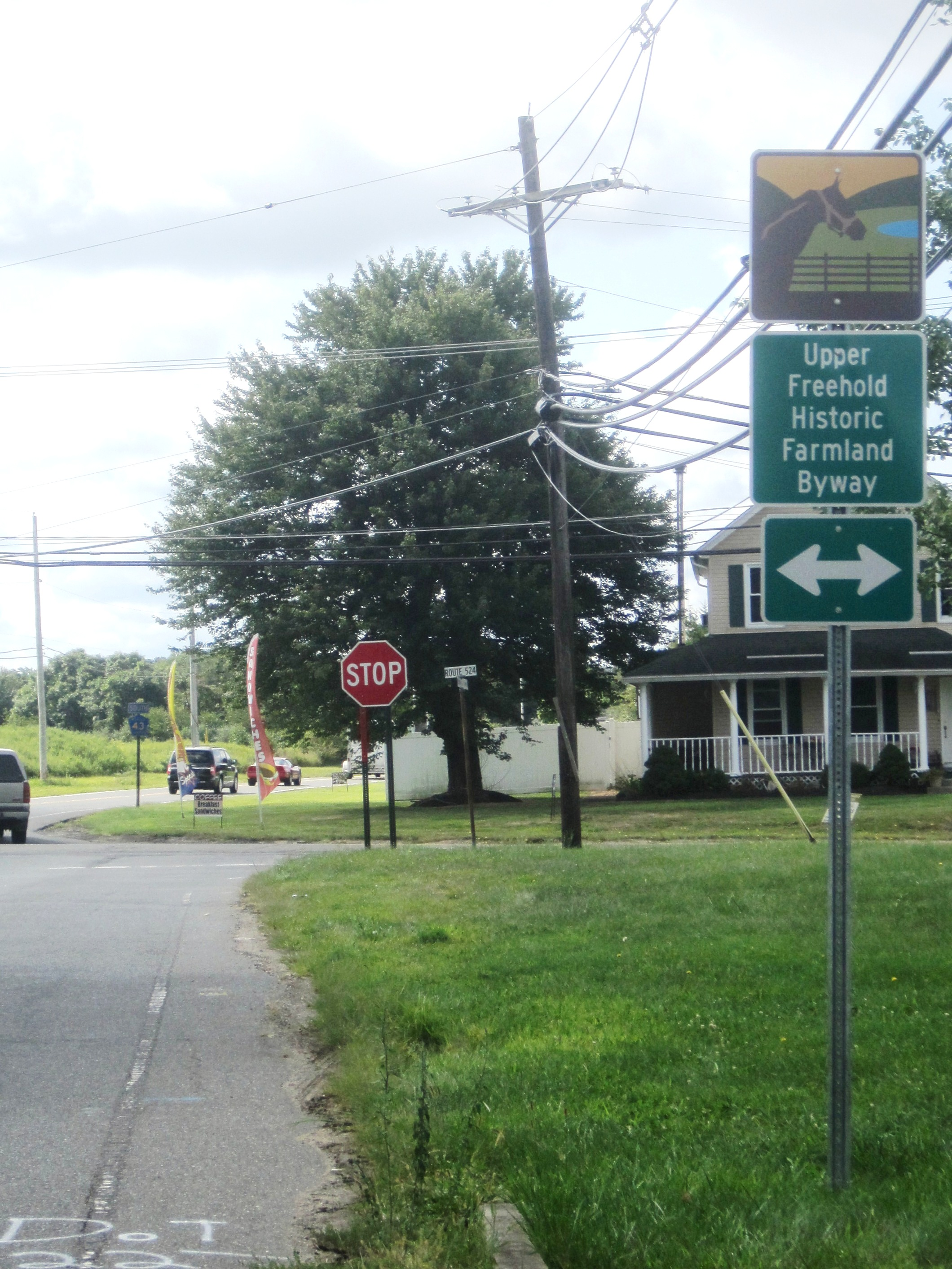
Signage for the Upper Freehold Historic Farmland Byway

The Upper Freehold Historic Farmland Byway runs through areas of farmland between Allentown and Walnford in Monmouth County. The byway follows CR 539, CR 524, Chambers Road, Rues Road, CR 526, Red Valley Road, CR 27, Arneystown-Hornerstown Road, Hill Road, Waln's Mill Road, Walnford Road, Polhemustown Road, Holmes Mill Road, and Walnford Road.

=== Warren Heritage Scenic Byway ===
Warren Heritage Scenic Byway
- Location: Greenwich Township–Hackettstown
- Length: 19 mi (31 km)

The Warren Heritage Scenic Byway follows Route 57 through mountain and valley areas between Greenwich Township and Hackettstown in Warren County, following the route of the historic Morris Canal.

=== Western Highlands Scenic Byway ===
Western Highlands Scenic Byway
- Location: Franklin Borough–Vernon Township
- Length: 23 mi (37 km)

The Western Highlands Scenic Byway runs through mountain areas in Sussex County. The main segment of the byway begins at Route 23 in Franklin Borough and follows CR 515 north to Vernon Township, where it follows Route 94 north to the New York border. A loop of the byway branches from Route 94 in Vernon Township and runs northwest on CR 644, southwest on CR 517, and northeast on Route 94.
