= South Dennis, New Jersey =

Populated place in Cape May County, New Jersey, US

- Unincorporated community
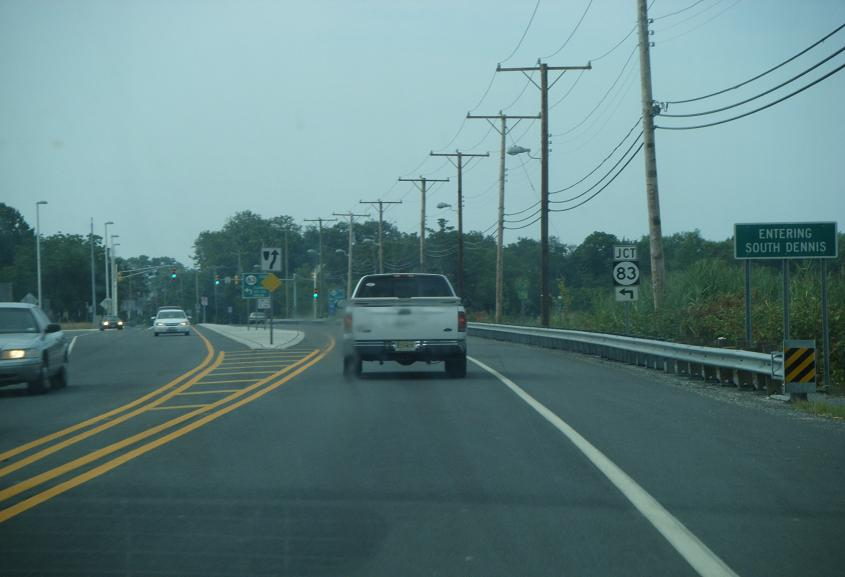
- Route 47 southbound approaching Route 83 in South Dennis

- Location in Cape May County Location in New Jersey Location in the United States
- Coordinates: 39°10′42″N 74°49′12″W
- Country: United States
- State: New Jersey
- County: Cape May
- Township: Dennis

Area
  - Total: 6.28 sq mi (16.27 km^{2})
  - Land: 6.21 sq mi (16.08 km^{2})
  - Water: 0.073 sq mi (0.19 km^{2})
- Elevation: 10 ft (3.0 m)

Population (2020)
  - Total: 1,703
  - Density: 274/sq mi (105.9/km^{2})
- Time zone: UTC−05:00 (Eastern (EST))
  - Summer (DST): UTC−04:00 (EDT)
- ZIP Code: 08245
- Area codes: 609, 640
- FIPS code: 34-68850
- GNIS feature ID: 880724

South Dennis is an unincorporated community located within Dennis Township in Cape May County, in the U.S. state of New Jersey. As of the 2020 census, South Dennis had a population of 1,703. It is part of the Ocean City Metropolitan Statistical Area. Its postal ZIP Code is 08245. The post office was established in 1873, with Robert Hutchinson as the first postmaster.

== Demographics ==
Historical population
Census	Pop.	Note	%±
2020	1,703		—
U.S. Decennial Census

South Dennis was first listed as a census designated place in the 2020 U.S. census.

South Dennis CDP, New Jersey – Racial and ethnic composition Note: the US Census treats Hispanic/Latino as an ethnic category. This table excludes Latinos from the racial categories and assigns them to a separate category. Hispanics/Latinos may be of any race.
Race / Ethnicity (NH = Non-Hispanic)	Pop 2020	2020
White alone (NH)	1,519	89.20%
Black or African American alone (NH)	17	1.00%
Native American or Alaska Native alone (NH)	0	0.00%
Asian alone (NH)	9	0.53%
Native Hawaiian or Pacific Islander alone (NH)	0	0.00%
Other race alone (NH)	4	0.23%
Mixed race or Multiracial (NH)	94	5.52%
Hispanic or Latino (any race)	60	3.52%
Total	1,703	100.00%

As of the 2000 United States census, there were 93 people and 41 households residing in the ZIP Code Tabulation Area 08245. The population density was 930 people per square mile.

== Geography ==
South Dennis is located at 39°10′42″N 74°49′12″W (39.099980, -74.848733). It lies 10 ft (3 m) above sea level. According to the United States Census Bureau, ZIP Code 08245 has a total area of 0.3 km^{2} (0.1 mi^{2}), all of which is land. Dennis Creek serves as the northern border of the community.

=== Climate ===
South Dennis lies on the cusp of a humid subtropical climate zone and experiences four discernible seasons. It receives an average of 44.52 inches (1,131 mm) of precipitation each year, with the wettest season being August. In January 1942, South Dennis experienced its lowest recorded temperature at -22 °F, while the hottest temperature was 103 °F in July 1993.

Climate data for South Dennis, NJ
Month	Jan	Feb	Mar	Apr	May	Jun	Jul	Aug	Sep	Oct	Nov	Dec	Year
Mean daily maximum °F (°C)	44 (7)	47 (8)	55 (13)	66 (19)	75 (24)	83 (28)	88 (31)	86 (30)	80 (27)	69 (21)	59 (15)	49 (9)	67 (19)
Mean daily minimum °F (°C)	22 (−6)	24 (−4)	30 (−1)	38 (3)	48 (9)	57 (14)	63 (17)	61 (16)	54 (12)	43 (6)	34 (1)	26 (−3)	42 (5)
Average precipitation inches (mm)	3.86 (98)	3.08 (78)	4.18 (106)	3.61 (92)	3.58 (91)	2.88 (73)	3.8 (97)	5.31 (135)	3.76 (96)	3.62 (92)	3.37 (86)	3.47 (88)	44.52 (1,132)
Source: The Weather Channel

== Infrastructure ==
=== Transportation ===
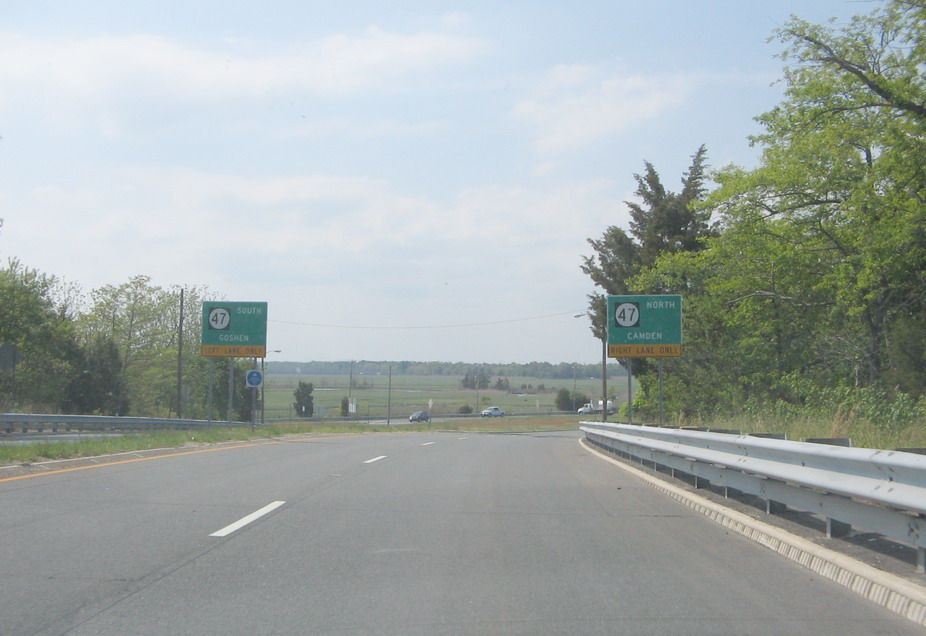
Route 83 westbound as it approaches its terminus at Route 47 in 2005 before the intersection was reconstructed to feature a traffic light. Note the 1950s-era curb.

South Dennis lies at the intersection of Route 47 (known as Delsea Drive) and Route 83. A major infrastructure project that realigned Route 47 and added a traffic light was completed in July 2007 at a cost of $6.7 million. Two county routes, County Route 628 and County Route 657, terminate shortly after entering South Dennis.

== Education ==
As with other parts of Dennis Township, the area is zoned to Dennis Township Public Schools (for grades K-8) and Middle Township Public Schools (for high school). The latter operates Middle Township High School.

Countywide schools include Cape May County Technical High School and Cape May County Special Services School District.

== Notable people ==
People who were born in, residents of, or otherwise closely associated with South Dennis include:

- Richard S. Leaming (1828–1895), ship builder and politician who served in both the New Jersey General Assembly and the New Jersey Senate and on the Cape May County Board of Chosen Freeholders.
