= Port Elizabeth, New Jersey =

Populated place in Cumberland County, New Jersey, US

- Census-designated place
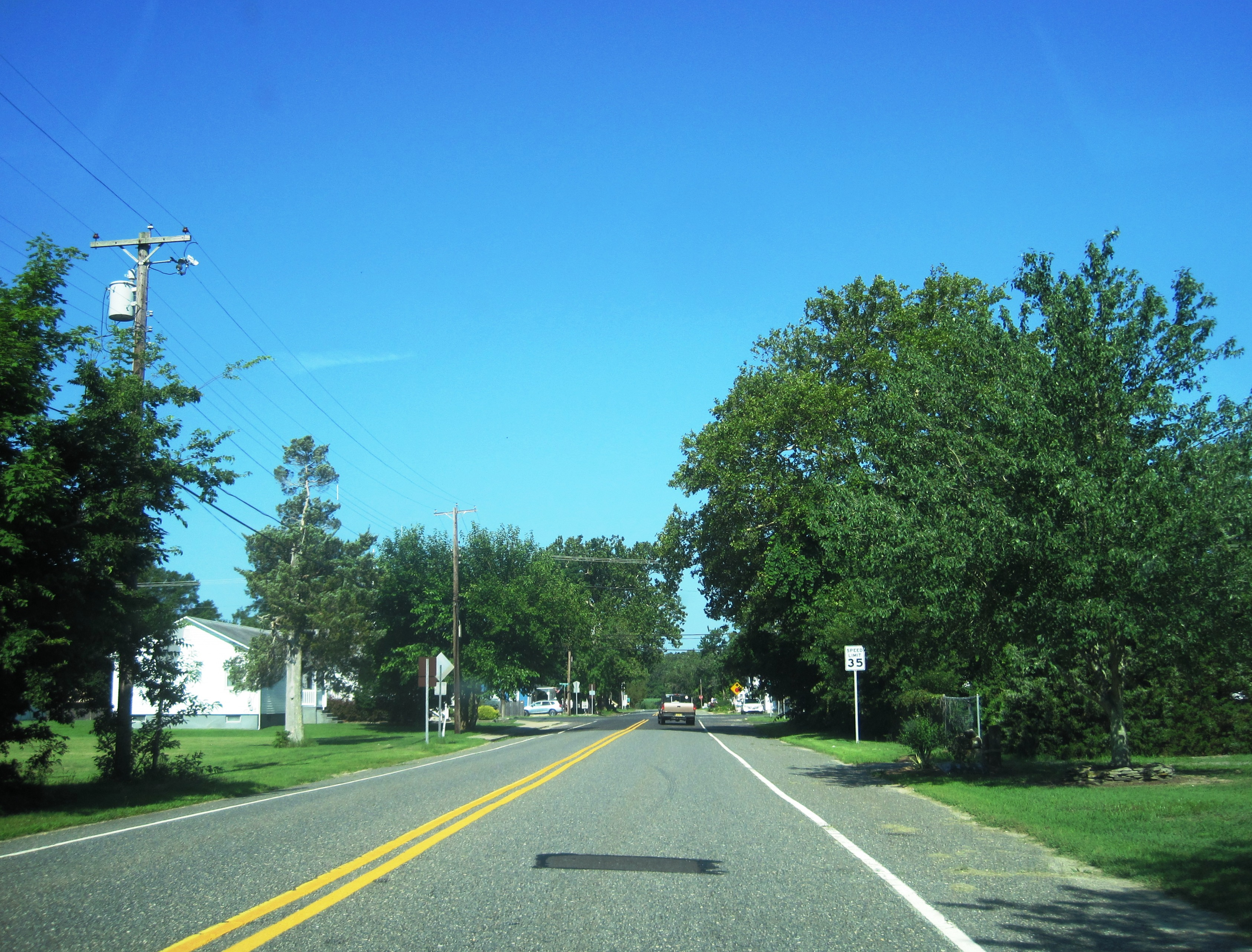
- Center of Port Elizabeth

- Location in Cumberland County Location in New Jersey Location in the United States
- Coordinates: 39°18′48″N 74°58′52″W
- Country: United States
- State: New Jersey
- County: Cumberland
- Township: Maurice River
- Named for: Elizabeth Clark Bodly

Area
  - Total: 1.63 sq mi (4.23 km^{2})
  - Land: 1.50 sq mi (3.88 km^{2})
  - Water: 0.14 sq mi (0.36 km^{2})
- Elevation: 13 ft (4 m)

Population (2020)
  - Total: 290
  - Density: 193.8/sq mi (74.82/km^{2})
- Time zone: UTC−05:00 (Eastern (EST))
  - Summer (DST): UTC−04:00 (Eastern (EDT))
- ZIP Code: 08348
- FIPS code: 34-60240
- GNIS feature ID: 0879436

Port Elizabeth is an unincorporated community and census-designated place (CDP) located within Maurice River Township in Cumberland County, in the U.S. state of New Jersey. The area is served as United States Postal Service ZIP Code 08348. As of the 2020 census, Port Elizabeth had a population of 290.

Route 47 and Route 55 intersect in Port Elizabeth.

== Demographics ==
Historical population
Census	Pop.	Note	%±
2020	290		—
U.S. Decennial Census; 2020

Port Elizabeth was first listed as a census designated place in the 2020 U.S. census.

Port Elizabeth CDP, New Jersey – Racial and ethnic composition Note: the US Census treats Hispanic/Latino as an ethnic category. This table excludes Latinos from the racial categories and assigns them to a separate category. Hispanics/Latinos may be of any race.
Race / Ethnicity (NH = Non-Hispanic)	Pop 2020	2020
White alone (NH)	253	87.24%
Black or African American alone (NH)	11	3.79%
Native American or Alaska Native alone (NH)	0	0.00%
Asian alone (NH)	0	0.00%
Native Hawaiian or Pacific Islander alone (NH)	0	0.00%
Other race alone (NH)	2	0.69%
Mixed race or Multiracial (NH)	7	2.41%
Hispanic or Latino (any race)	17	5.86%
Total	290	100.00%

=== 2000 ===
According to the 2020–2024 American Community Survey 5-year estimates, ZIP Code Tabulation Area (ZCTA) 08348 had a population of 154.

== History ==
Port Elizabeth, named for Elizabeth Clark Bodly, a Quaker and owner of lands on which Port Elizabeth lays, was laid out in 1785. In 1778, a dam was built on the Manumuskin River, drying out valuable lands for farmers, who flocked in. Further down the river wharves were built, giving Port Elizabeth the Port part of the name.

=== Historic structures ===
- Port Elizabeth United Methodist Church, built in 1827 to replace Cumberland County's first Methodist Church, which was completed in 1786.
- !John Boggs Hall, built in 1854 as the Port Elizabeth School, was moved to its present location in 1958, where it is used as the Sunday School and fellowship hall of Port Elizabeth United Methodist Church.
- Port Elizabeth Library, built in 1810 as a general store, was known as Lee Hall for some time until 1962, when it became the fellowship hall of Port Elizabeth Methodist Church.
- Eagle Glass Works Hotel, built around 1807 to house the Eagle Glass Works.
- St. Elizabeth of Hungary Roman Catholic Church, built in 1810 for the Eagle Glass Works workers, was moved to Goshen, NJ in 1878.

== Education ==
It is in the Maurice River Township School District.

== Notable people ==
People who were born in, residents of, or otherwise closely associated with Port Elizabeth include:

- Mike Lafferty (born 1975), Enduro motorcycle champion.
- Thomas Lee (1780–1856), represented New Jersey at large in the United States House of Representatives from 1833-1837. He was postmaster of Port Elizabeth from 1818-1833 and 1846-1849 and founder of Port Elizabeth Library and Academy.

== Climate ==
The climate in this area is characterized by hot, humid summers and generally mild to cool winters. According to the Köppen Climate Classification system, Port Elizabeth has a humid subtropical climate, abbreviated "Cfa" on climate maps.
