= Clermont, Cape May County, New Jersey =

Populated place in Cape May County, New Jersey, US

Clermont, New Jersey
- Unincorporated community
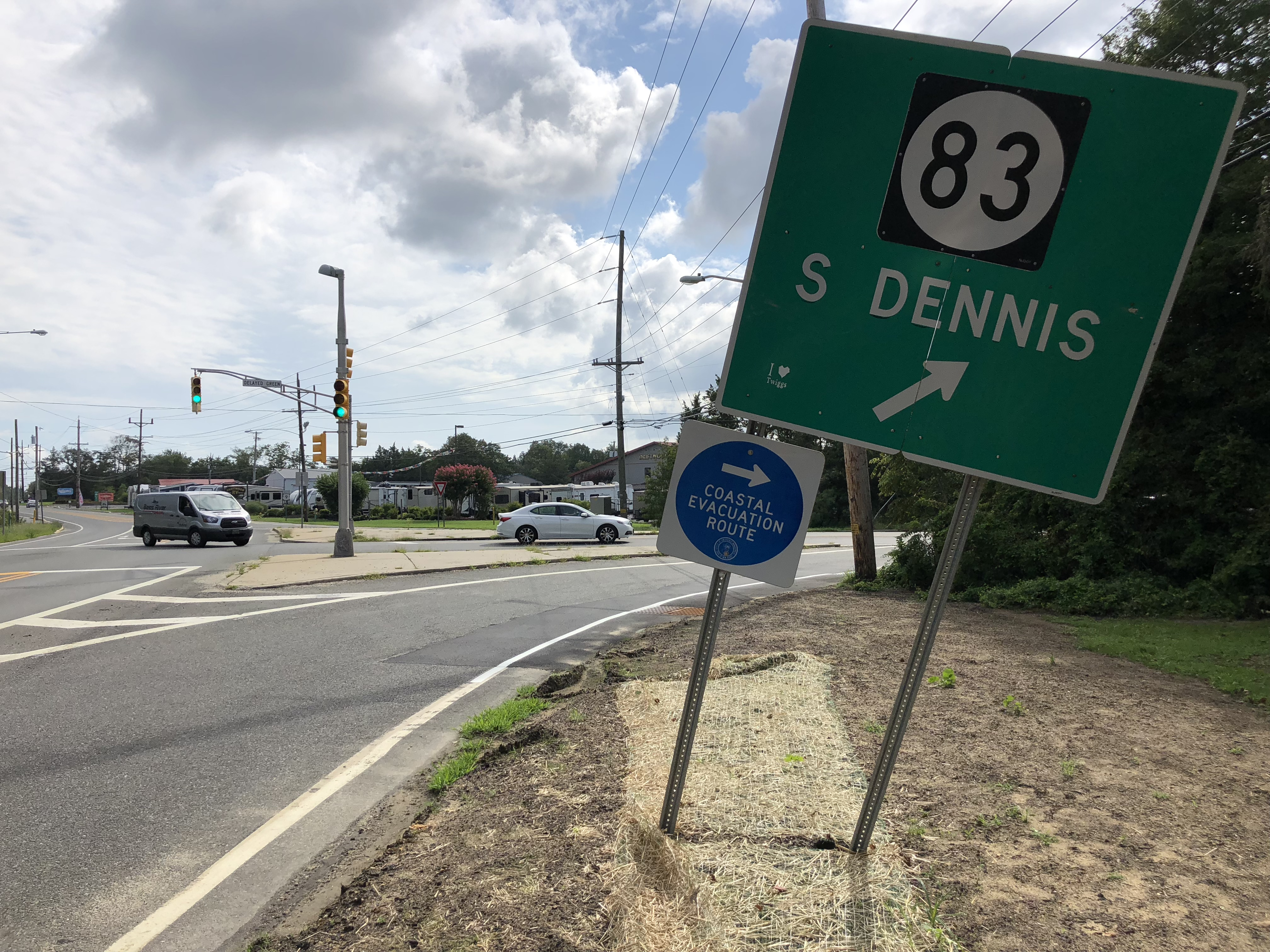
- US 9 southbound at Route 83 in Clermont

- Clermont's location in Cape May County (Inset: Cape May County in New Jersey) Clermont (New Jersey) Clermont (the United States)
- Coordinates: 39°09′04″N 74°45′46″W
- Country: United States
- State: New Jersey
- County: Cape May
- Township: Dennis
- Elevation: 16 ft (5 m)
- GNIS feature ID: 874190

Clermont is an unincorporated community located within Dennis Township in Cape May County, in the U.S. state of New Jersey.

A post office was established in 1886, with Chester Todd as the first postmaster.
