= County Road 611 =

County Road 611 or County Route 611 may refer to the following:

- County Road 611 (Indian River County, Florida), formerly State Road 611
- County Road 611 (Pinellas County, Florida), a major north-south route that includes the Bayside Bridge
- County Road 611 (St. Lucie County, Florida), formerly State Road 611
- County Road 611 (Grand Traverse County, Michigan)
- County Route 611 (Atlantic County, New Jersey)
- County Route 611 (Burlington County, New Jersey)
- County Route 611 (Camden County, New Jersey)
- County Route 611 (Cape May County, New Jersey)
- County Route 611 (Cumberland County, New Jersey)
- County Route 611 (Essex County, New Jersey)
- County Route 611 (Gloucester County, New Jersey)
- County Route 611 (Hudson County, New Jersey)
- County Route 611 (Hunterdon County, New Jersey)
- County Route 611 (Mercer County, New Jersey)
- County Route 611 (Middlesex County, New Jersey)
- County Route 611 (Morris County, New Jersey)
- County Route 611 (Ocean County, New Jersey)
- County Route 611 (Passaic County, New Jersey)
- County Route 611 (Salem County, New Jersey)
- County Route 611 (Sussex County, New Jersey)
- County Route 611 (Union County, New Jersey)
- County Route 611 (Warren County, New Jersey)
