= List of county routes in Salem County, New Jersey =

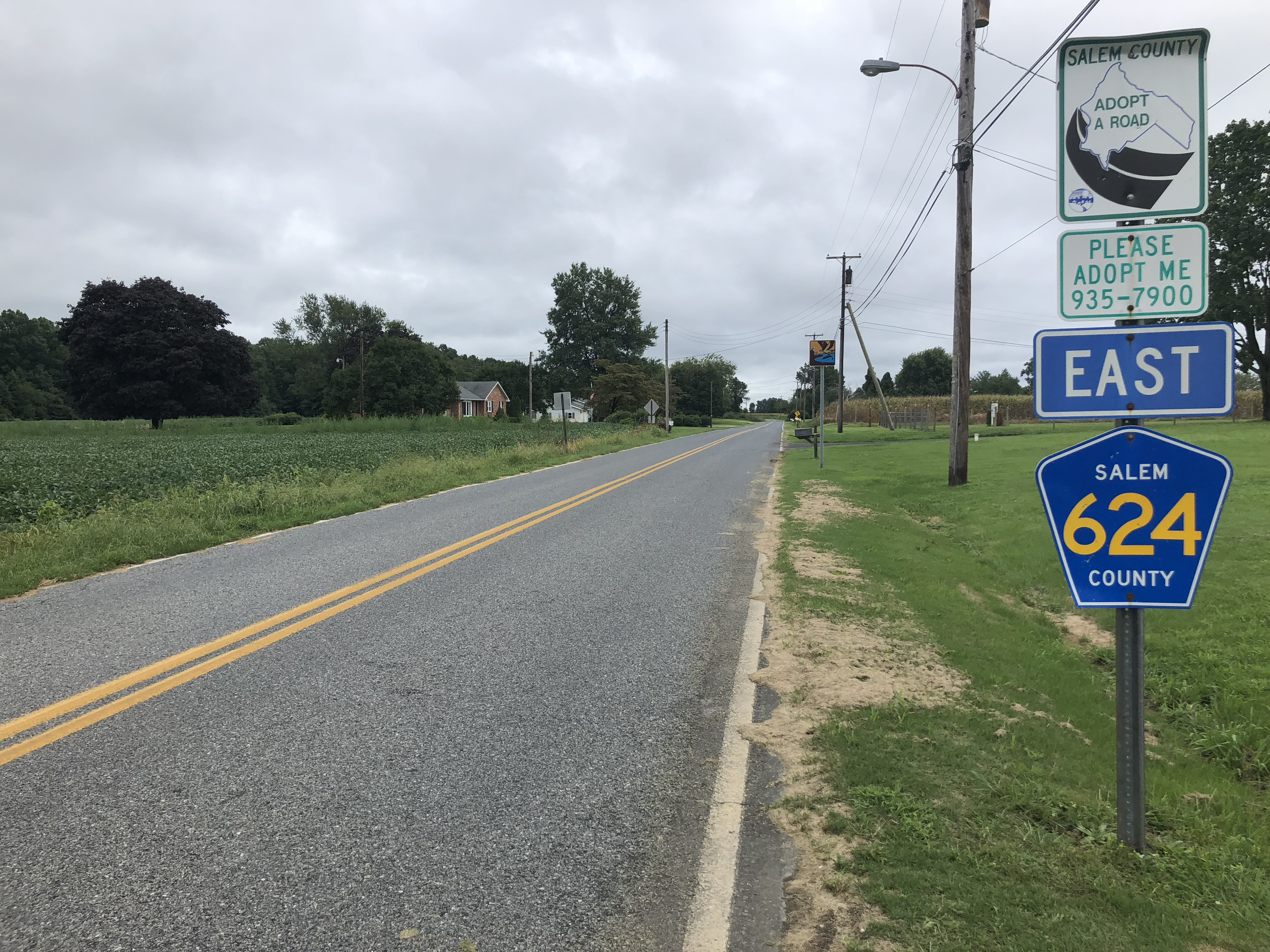
CR 624 in Elsinboro Township

The following is a list of county routes in Salem County in the U.S. state of New Jersey. For more information on the county route system in New Jersey as a whole, including its history, see County routes in New Jersey.

== 500-series county routes ==
In addition to those listed below, the following 500-series county routes serve Salem County:

- CR 540, CR 551, CR 553, CR 581

== Other county routes ==
Route	Length (mi)	Length (km)	From	Via	To	Notes
CR 601	5.11	8.22	Hollywood Avenue (CR 618) in Carneys Point	South Golfwood Avenue, North Golfwood Avenue, Pennsville–Pedricktown Road	Penns Grove–Pedricktown Road (CR 642) in Oldmans Township	
CR 602	10.43	16.79	East Avenue (US 40) in Woodstown	Elm Street, Auburn Road, Pedricktown–Woodstown Road, South Railroad Avenue, North Railroad Avenue	US 130 in Oldmans Township	
CR 603	5.72	9.21	Commissioners Pike (CR 581) in Alloway Township	Alloway–Woodstown Road Woodstown–Alloway Road, Lotus Avenue	South Main Street (CR 672) in Woodstown	
CR 604	4.90	7.89	Chestnut Street (US 40), Bridgeton Pike (Route 77), Pole Tavern Road (Route 77), and Daretown Road (CR 635) at the Pole Tavern Circle in Upper Pittsgrove	Monroeville Road	Monroeville Road (CR 604) at the Gloucester County line in Upper Pittsgrove	
CR 605	2.02	3.25	Bypass Road (CR 668) in Woodstown	Swedesboro Road	Woodstown Road (CR 605) at the Gloucester County line in Pilesgrove Township	
CR 606	0.77	1.24	Locust Island Road (CR 658) in Lower Alloways Creek	Buttonwood Avenue, Main Street, Front Street	Locust Island Road (CR 658) in Lower Alloways Creek	
CR 607	1.93	3.11	Maple Avenue (CR 634) in Penns Grove	South Broad Street, North Broad Street	US 130 in Carneys Point	
CR 608	1.90	3.06	Olivet Road (CR 690) in Pilesgrove Township	Palatine Road	Burlington Road (CR 677) in Pilesgrove Township	
CR 609	3.31	5.33	North Main Street (CR 648) and Pine Tavern Road (CR 648) in Upper Pittsgrove	Richwood Road	Hardingville Road (CR 609) at the Gloucester County line in Upper Pittsgrove	
CR 610	2.85	4.59	Centerton Road (CR 553) and Buck Road (CR 553) in Pittsgrove Township	Centerton Road	Centerton Road (CR 611) and Dutch Row Road (CR 611) in Pittsgrove Township	
CR 611	13.37	21.52	East Main Street (CR 581) and Commissioners Pike (CR 581) in Alloway Township	Alloway–Aldine Road, Aldine–Shirley Road, Shirley Road, Salem Street, Dutch Row Road	Dutch Row Road (CR 611) at the Gloucester County line in Upper Pittsgrove	
CR 612	1.05	1.69	Centerton Road (CR 553) in Pittsgrove Township	Dealtown Road	Olivet Road (CR 690) in Pittsgrove Township	
CR 613	5.43	8.74	Centerton Road (CR 553) in Pittsgrove Township	Porchtown Road	Porchtown Road (CR 613) at the Gloucester County line in Pittsgrove Township	
CR 614	4.93	7.93	Route 77 in Alloway Township	Bridgeton Road, Daretown–Alloway Road	Commissioners Pike (CR 581) in Pilesgrove Township	
CR 615	3.72	5.99	Yorketown Road (CR 672) and South Main Street (CR 672) in Pilesgrove Township	Woodstown–Daretown Road	Daretown Road (CR 635) in Upper Pittsgrove	
CR 616	1.11	1.79	Harding Highway (US 40) and West Avenue (US 40/Route 45) in Pilesgrove Township	Bailey Street	South Main Street (CR 672) in Woodstown	
CR 617	2.39	3.85	Route 45 in Woodstown	Eldridges Hill Road	Eldridges Hill Road (CR 617) at the Gloucester County line in Pilesgrove Township	
CR 618	0.91	1.46	Pennsville–Auburn Road (CR 551) in Carneys Point	Hollywood Avenue	Shell Road (US 130) in Carneys Point	
CR 619	4.95	7.97	Harding Highway (US 40) in Pilesgrove Township	Glassboro Road	Whig Lane (CR 619) at the Gloucester County line in Upper Pittsgrove	
CR 620	9.41	15.14	Bypass Road (CR 540) in Mannington Township	Kings Highway	Kings Highway (CR 620) at the Gloucester County line in Pilesgrove Township	
CR 621	2.87	4.62	Porchtown Road (CR 613) and Upper Neck Road (CR 690) in Pittsgrove Township	Lawrence Corner Road	Willow Grove Road (CR 639) in Pittsgrove Township	
CR 623	7.95	12.79	Canton Road (CR 623) at the Cumberland County line in Lower Alloways Creek	Main Street, Hamersville–Canton Road, New Bridge Road, Kent Street, Grieves Parkway	Yorke Street (CR 658) in Salem	
CR 624	3.71	5.97	Salem–Fort Elfsborg Road (CR 625) in Elsinboro Township	Fort Elfsborg Road	Salem–Hancocks Bridge Road (CR 658) in Lower Alloways Creek	
CR 625	4.04	6.50	Dead end in Elsinboro Township	Fort Elfsborg Road, Chestnut Street	West Broadway (Route 49) in Salem	
CR 626	5.66	9.11	Roadstown Road (CR 626) at the Cumberland County line in Quinton Township	Jericho Road	Route 49 in Quinton Township	
CR 627	2.64	4.25	Fort Elfsborg Road (CR 624) in Elsinboro Township	Amwellbury Road, Tilbury Road	Tilbury Road (CR 661) and Sinnickson Landing Road (CR 661) in Elsinboro Township	
CR 628	3.68	5.92	Pointers–Auburn Road (CR 646) on the Carneys Point/Pilesgrove township line	Courses Landing Road, Game Creek Road	Harding Highway (Route 48) in Carneys Point	
CR 629	1.32	2.12	Shell Road (US 130) in Carneys Point	Georgetown Road	Pennsville–Auburn Road (CR 551) in Carneys Point	
CR 630	3.31	5.33	Isaac Drive in Pennsville	Fort Mott Road	South Broadway (Route 49) in Pennsville	
CR 631	6.05	9.74	Hawks Bridge Road (CR 540) in Mannington Township	Haines Neck Road	Route 45 in Mannington Township	
CR 632	2.39	3.85	Fort Mott Road (CR 630) in Pennsville	Old Fort Mott Road, Lighthouse Road	South Broadway (Route 49) in Pennsville	
CR 633	1.15	1.85	Amwellbury Road (CR 627) in Elsinboro Township	Amwellbury Road	Salem–Hancocks Bridge Road (CR 658) in Elsinboro Township	
CR 634	1.06	1.71	Virginia Avenue (US 130) in Penns Grove	East Maple Avenue, West Maple Avenue, State Street	West Main Street (CR 675) in Penns Grove	
CR 635	8.75	14.08	Old Cohansey Road (CR 635) at the Cumberland County line in Alloway Township	Cohansey–Friesburg Road, Friesburg–Aldine Road, Daretown Road	Chestnut Street (US 40), Pole Tavern Road (Route 77), and Bridgeton Pike (Route 77) at Pole Tavern Circle in Upper Pittsgrove	
CR 636	1.76	2.83	Kings Highway (CR 620) in Pilesgrove Township	Marlton Road	Main Street (Route 45) in Woodstown	
CR 637	1.34	2.16	Fort Elfsborg Road (CR 624) in Elsinboro Township	Hagerville Road	Salem–Hancocks Bridge Road (CR 658) in Elsinboro Township	
CR 638	2.35	3.78	Landis Avenue (Route 56) in Pittsgrove Township	Gershal Avenue	Garden Road (CR 674) in Pittsgrove Township	
CR 639	5.52	8.88	Centerton Road (CR 610) and Lawrence Corner Road (CR 621) in Pittsgrove Township	Willow Grove Road	Weymouth Road (CR 690) at the Cumberland County line in Pittsgrove Township	
CR 640	5.26	8.47	Greenwich Street (CR 540) in Alloway Township	Alloway–Friesburg Road, Friesburg–Deerfield Road	Friesburg–Deerfield Road (CR 640) at the Cumberland County line in Alloway Township	
CR 641	5.59	9.00	North Broad Street (CR 607) in Penns Grove	East Line Street, Penns Grove–Auburn Road	Pointers–Auburn Road (CR 646) in Carneys Point	
CR 642	2.26	3.64	Crown Point Road (US 130) in Oldmans Township	Penns Grove–Pedricktown Road, West Mill Street, East Mill Street	Pedricktown Road (CR 601) at Gloucester County line in Oldmans Township	
CR 643	4.71	7.58	Pennsville–Auburn Road (CR 551) in Oldmans Township	Straughns Mill Road, Porcupine Road	Crown Point Road (US 130) in Oldmans Township	
CR 644	4.37	7.03	Crown Point Road (US 130) in Oldmans Township	Perkintown Road	Pennsville–Auburn Road (CR 551) in Oldmans Township	
CR 645	5.34	8.59	Parvins Mill Road (CR 645) at the Cumberland County line in Pittsgrove Township	Parvin Mill Road	Willow Grove Road (CR 639/CR 690) in Pittsgrove Township	
CR 646	6.19	9.96	Hawks Bridge Road (CR 540) in Mannington Township	Pointers–Auburn Road	Pennsville–Auburn Road (CR 551) in Oldmans Township	
CR 647	1.54	2.48	Marlboro Road (CR 647) at the Cumberland County line in Quinton Township	Marlboro Road, Telegraph Road	Telegraph Road (CR 540) and Pecks Corner–Cohansey Road (CR 540/CR 667) in Quinton Township	
CR 648 (1)	5.97	9.61	Salem Street (CR 611) in Elmer	Main Street, Pine Tavern Road	Lincoln Road at the Gloucester County line in Upper Pittsgrove	
CR 648 (2)	0.05	0.08	Monroeville Road (CR 604) in Upper Pittsgrove	Burlington Road	Pine Tavern Road (CR 648) in Upper Pittsgrove	
CR 649	0.98	1.58	State Street (CR 611) in Upper Pittsgrove	Front Street	Chestnut Street (US 40) in Elmer	
CR 650	3.03	4.88	Salem–Hancocks Bridge Road (CR 658) in Lower Alloways Creek	Quinton–Hancocks Bridge Road	Route 49 in Quinton Township	
CR 651	2.42	3.89	New Bridge Road (CR 623) in Lower Alloways Creek	Beasley Neck Road	Cross Road (CR 654) in Quinton Township	
CR 652	1.46	2.35	Main Street (CR 623) in Lower Alloways Creek	Smick Road	Maskells Mill Road (CR 658) in Lower Alloways Creek	
CR 653	3.85	6.20	Route 49 in Quinton Township	Action Station Road	Route 45 in Mannington Township	
CR 654	4.26	6.86	Maskells Mill Road (CR 658) in Lower Alloways Creek	Cross Road	Route 49 in Quinton Township	
CR 655	5.54	8.92	Landis Avenue (Route 56) in Pittsgrove Township	Alvine Road	Willow Grove Road (CR 639) in Pittsgrove Township	
CR 656	2.38	3.83	Alloway–Aldine Road (CR 611) in Alloway Township	Remsterville Road	Cohansey–Friesburg Road (CR 635) in Alloway Township	
CR 657	6.25	10.06	Front Street (Route 49) in Salem	Griffith Street, Grant Street, Quaker Neck Road	Welchville Road (CR 540) in Alloway Township	
CR 658	10.05	16.17	Main Street (CR 623) in Lower Alloways Creek	Friendship Road, Maskells Mill Road, Hancocks Bridge–Hamersville Road, Locust Island Road, Salem–Hancocks Bridge Road, Yorke Street, Keasbey Street	Grant Street (CR 657) in Salem	
CR 659	2.09	3.36	Quaker Neck Road (CR 657) in Mannington Township	Clancy Road	Quaker Neck Road (CR 657) in Alloway Township	
CR 660	7.55	12.15	Auburn Road (CR 602) in Pilesgrove Township	Point Airy Road, Eldridges Hill Road, Whig Lane Road	Bridgeton Pike (Route 77) in Upper Pittsgrove	
CR 661	2.53	4.07	Salem–Fort Elfsborg Road (CR 625) in Elsinboro Township	Sinnickson Landing Road, Tilbury Road	Grieves Parkway in Salem	
CR 662	0.88	1.42	Salem Street (CR 611) in Elmer	Broad Street	South Main Street (CR 648) in Elmer	
CR 663	2.13	3.43	Center Road (CR 663) at the Cumberland County line in Alloway Township	Canhouse Road	Aldine–Shirley Road (CR 611) in Alloway Township	
CR 664	1.76	2.83	Welchville Road (CR 540)in Alloway Township	Timberman Road	Woodstown–Alloway Road (CR 603) in Alloway Township	
CR 665	3.19	5.13	Hagersville Road (CR 637) in Elsinboro Township	Walnut Street	East Broadway (Route 49) in Salem	
CR 666	3.82	6.15	Monroeville Road (CR 694) at the Gloucester County line in Upper Pittsgrove	Swedesboro Road	Monroeville Road (CR 604) in Upper Pittsgrove	
CR 667	5.87	9.45	Hammersville–Pecks Corner Road (CR 658) and Maskells Mill Road (CR 658) in Lower Alloways Creek	Hammersville–Pecks Corner Road	Pecks Corner–Cohansey Road (CR 540) and Telegraph Road (CR 540/CR 647) in Quinton Township	
CR 668	0.12	0.19	Swedesboro Road (CR 605) in Woodstown	Bypass Road	Route 45 in Woodstown	
CR 669	1.07	1.72	Cemetery Road (CR 679) in Mannington Township	Cheney Road	Route 45 in Mannington Township	
CR 670	1.34	2.16	Riviera Drive in Pennsville	Industrial Park Road	Fort Mott Road (CR 630) in Pennsville	
CR 671	2.15	3.46	Willow Grove Road (CR 639) in Pittsgrove Township	Fork Bridge Road	Harding Highway (US 40) on the Pittsgrove/Upper Pittsgrove township line	
CR 672	7.86	12.65	Cohansey–Friesburg Road (CR 635) and Friesburg–Aldine Road (CR 635) in Alloway Township	Watson Mill Road, Yorktown Road, Main Street	East Avenue (US 40), West Avenue (US 40/Route 45), and Main Street (Route 45) in Woodstown	
CR 674	5.11	8.22	Olivet Road (CR 690) in Pittsgrove Township	Garden Road	West Garden Road (CR 674) at the Cumberland County line in Pittsgrove Township	
CR 675	1.82	2.93	Virginia Avenue (US 130) and East Main Street (Route 48) in Penns Grove	East Main Street, West Main Street, Delaware Avenue, 6th Avenue	North Broad Street (CR 607) in Carneys Point	
CR 676	0.80	1.29	Welchville Road (CR 540) in Alloway Township	McKillip Road	Hackett Road in Mannington Township	
CR 677	6.46	10.40	Old Burlington Road (CR 677) at the Cumberland County line in Pittsgrove Township	Burlington Road	Monroeville Road (CR 604) and Pine Tavern Road (CR 648) in Upper Pittsgrove	
CR 678	1.67	2.69	Cemetery Road (CR 679) in Pilesgrove Township	Old Salem Road	Bailey Street (CR 616) in Woodstown	
CR 679	1.49	2.40	Mannington-Yorketown Road in Mannington Township	Cemetery Road	Route 45 in Pilesgrove Township	
CR 690	7.05	11.35	Olivet Road at the Cumberland County line in Pittsgrove Township	Olivet Road, Centerton Road, Upper Neck Road	Willow Grove Road (CR 639) in Pittsgrove Township	
