= List of county routes in Gloucester County, New Jersey =

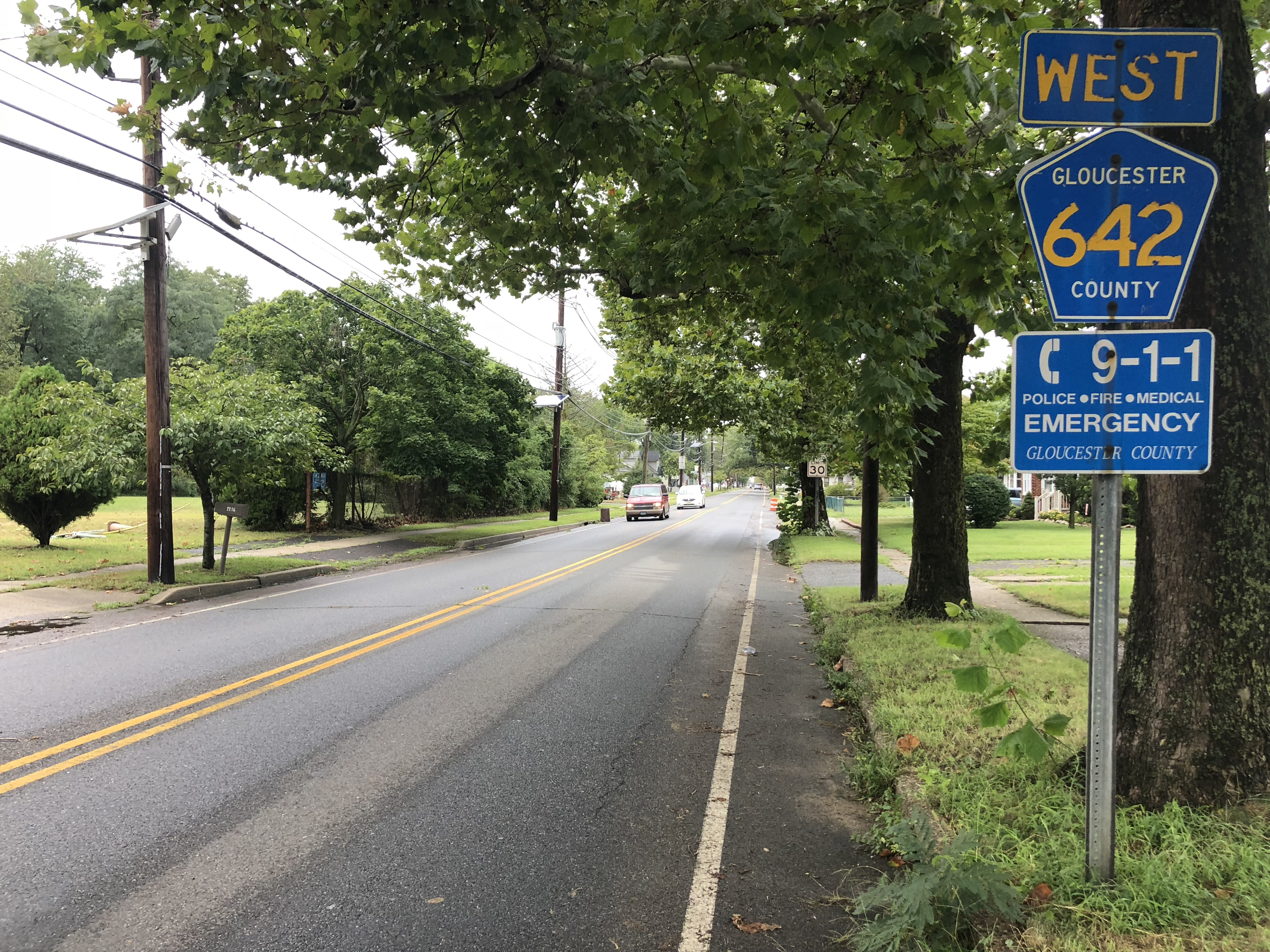
CR 642 entering National Park

The following is a list of county routes in Gloucester County in the U.S. state of New Jersey. For more information on the county route system in New Jersey as a whole, including its history, see County routes in New Jersey.

== 500-series county routes ==
In addition to those listed below, the following 500-series county routes serve Gloucester County:

- CR 534, CR 536, CR 536A, CR 536 Spur, CR 538, CR 544, CR 551, CR 553, CR 553 Alt, CR 555, CR 557, CR 581

== Other county routes ==
Route	Length (mi)	Length (km)	From	Via	To	Notes
CR 601	2.20	3.54	East Mill Street (CR 642) at the Salem County line in Logan Township	Pedricktown Road	High Hill Road (CR 662) in Logan Township	
CR 602	5.63	9.06	Pedricktown Road (CR 601) in Logan Township	Harrisonville Road, Pedricktown–Harrisonville Road, Oldmans Creek Road	Woodstown Road (CR 605) in Woolwich Township	
CR 603	8.83	14.21	Bridgeton Pike (Route 45) in Harrison Township	Breakneck Road, Center Street, Blackwood–Barnsboro Road	Church Street (CR 534) in Washington Township	One of the roads that intersects in the Five Points area
CR 604	2.85	4.59	Monroeville Road (CR 604) at the Salem County line in Elk Township	Monroeville Road	Swedesboro Road (CR 538) in Franklin Township	
CR 605	3.94	6.34	Swedesboro Road (CR 605) at the Salem County line in South Harrison Township	Woodstown Road, Kings Highway	Kings Highway (CR 551), Auburn Road (CR 551), and Lake Avenue (CR 694) in Swedesboro	
CR 606	0.80	1.29	Madison Avenue on the Clayton/Franklin Township border	East Avenue	Academy Street (CR 610) in Clayton	
CR 607	9.32	15.00	Monroeville Road (CR 694) in South Harrison Township	Tomlin Station Road	West Broad Street (Route 44) and Democrat Road (CR 673) in Greenwich Township	
CR 608	2.00	3.22	Aura Road (CR 667) in Elk Township	Clayton Avenue, Academy Street	Academy Street (CR 610) in Clayton	
CR 609	7.80	12.55	Richwood Road (CR 609) at the Salem County line in Elk Township	Hardingville Road, Richwood Road, Barnsboro Road	Breakneck Road (CR 603) in Mantua Township	
CR 610	8.44	13.58	Whig Lane (CR 619) and Union Street (CR 619) in Elk Township	Whig Lane, Aura Road, Academy Street, Clayton–Willamstown Road, Clayton Road	Sicklerville Road (US 322), Glassboro–Williamstown Road (US 322), and Main Street (CR 654) in Monroe Township	
CR 611	0.70	1.13	Dutch Row Road (CR 611) at the Salem County line in Franklin Township	Dutch Row Road	Buck Road (CR 553) in Elk Township	
CR 612	8.38	13.49	Porchtown Road (CR 613) in Franklin Township	Williamstown Road, Franklinville–Williamstown Road, Corkery Lane	Black Horse Pike (US 322) in Monroe Township	Gap in route along Franklinville–Williamstown Road between Coles Mill Road (CR 538) and Tuckahoe Road (CR 555).
CR 613	2.35	3.78	Porchtown Road (CR 613) at the Salem County line in Franklin Township	Porchtown Road	Delsea Drive (Route 47), Coles Mill Road (CR 538), and Swedesboro Road (CR 538) in Franklin Township	
CR 614	2.30	3.70	Woodstown Road (CR 605) in Woolwich Township	Davidson Road, Russell Mill Road	Franklinville Road (CR 538) in Woolwich Township	
CR 615	3.85	6.20	North West Boulevard (CR 615) at the Cumberland County line in Newfield	West Boulevard, Malaga Park Drive	Delsea Drive (Route 47) in Franklin Township	
CR 616	0.65	1.05	Bridgeton Pike (Route 77) in Elk Township	Ferrell Road	Elk Road (CR 538) in Elk Township	
CR 617	3.29	5.29	Elridges Hill Road (CR 617) at the Salem County line in South Harrison Township	Elridges Hill Road, Main Street, Mullica Hill Road	Route 45 in South Harrison Township	
CR 618	3.74	6.02	Commissioners Road (CR 581) in South Harrison Township	Fislerville Road, Harrisonville Road	Mullica Hill Road (US 322) in Harrison Township	
CR 619	5.15	8.29	Glassboro Road (CR 619) at the Salem County line in Elk Township	Whig Lane	Main Street (CR 553) in Glassboro	
CR 620	8.38	13.49	US 130 in Logan Township	Center Square Road, Kings Highway	Kings Highway (CR 620) at the Salem County line in Woolwich Township	
CR 621	6.19	9.96	Woodbury–Turnersville Road (CR 707) at the Camden County line in Washington Township	County House Road, Almonesson Road	Delsea Drive (Route 47) in Westville	
CR 622	1.27	2.04	Elk township line in Harrison Township	Ewan Road	Richwood Road (CR 609) in Harrison Township	
CR 623	5.89	9.48	Whig Lane (CR 619) in Elk Township	Clems Run Road	Mullica Hill Road US 322 and Mullica Hill Bypass (US 322 in Harrison Township	
CR 624	5.96	9.59	Bridgeton Pike (Route 45) in Harrison Township	Jefferson Road, Pitman Road, West Holly Avenue, East Holly Avenue	Delsea Drive (Route 47) on the Pitman/Washington Township border	
CR 625	0.30	0.48	Jefferson Road (CR 624) and Pitman Road (CR 624) in Mantua Township	Pitman Road	Barnsboro Road (CR 609) in Mantua Township	
CR 626	2.19	3.52	Bridgeton Pike (Route 45) in Mantua Township	Heritage Road	Main Street (CR 553 Alt.) in Mantua Township	
CR 627	2.49	4.01	Jefferson Road (CR 624) in Mantua Township	Jackson Road	Bridgeton Pike (Route 45) in Mantua Township	
CR 628	0.64	1.03	Ellis Street (CR 641) in Glassboro	Sewell Street	Main Street (CR 553) in Glassboro	
CR 629	0.40	0.64	Main Street (CR 553 Alt.) in Mantua Township	New Street	Center Street (CR 603) in Mantua Township	
CR 630	4.10	6.60	Hurffville–Cross Keys Road (CR 654) in Washington Township	Egg Harbor Road	Delsea Drive (Route 47) and Hurffville Road (Route 41) in Deptford Township	One of the roads that intersects at Five Points
CR 631	1.52	2.45	Ramp from Interstate 295 (via Exit 22) in West Deptford Township	Crown Point Road	US 130 in West Deptford Township	
CR 632	2.69	4.33	Harrison Avenue (CR 678) in Mantua Township	Berkley Road, Mantua Boulevard, Wenonah Avenue, Mantua Avenue	Woodbury–Glassboro Road (CR 553) in Wenonah	
CR 633	3.11	5.01	Malaga Road (CR 659) in Monroe Township	Blue Bell Road	Virginia Avenue in Monroe Township	
CR 634	3.22	5.18	Delsea Drive (Route 47) in Glassboro	Fish Pond Road	Hurffville–Cross Keys Road (CR 654) in Washington Township	
CR 635	7.03	11.31	Mullica Hill Road (US 322) and Aura Road (CR 667) in Harrison Township	Lambs Road, Hurffville–Grenloch Road	Woodbury–Turnersville Road (CR 705) in Washington Township	
CR 636	0.88	1.42	Clayton Avenue (CR 608) and Academy Street (CR 608) in Clayton	Clayton Avenue	Delsea Drive (Route 47) in Clayton	
CR 637	2.71	4.36	Whig Lane (CR 610) in Elk Township	Fairview Road, Academy Street	High Street (CR 641) in Glassboro	
CR 638	1.09	1.75	Dead end in National Park	Columbia Boulevard	Red Bank Avenue (CR 644) in National Park	
CR 639	5.14	8.27	Broadway (CR 553 Alt.) in Pitman	Pitman Road, Chapel Heights Road, Ganttown Road	Black Horse Pike (Route 42) in Washington Township	
CR 640	1.24	2.00	Grove Street (CR 643) in West Deptford Township	Delaware Street	Woodbury border in West Deptford Township	
CR 641	6.33	10.19	Bridgeton Pike (Route 77) in Elk Township	Ellis Mill Road, Ellis Street, High Street	High Street (US 322) and Delsea Drive (Route 47/US 322) in Glassboro	
CR 642	2.80	4.51	Fort Mercer entrance in National Park	Hessian Avenue	North Broad Street (Route 45) in West Deptford Township	
CR 643	4.36	7.02	Kings Highway (CR 551) in West Deptford Township	Grove Road, Friars Boulevard, Grove Street, Grove Avenue	Red Bank Avenue (CR 644) in West Deptford Township	
CR 644	4.99	8.03	Dead end at the Delaware River in West Deptford Township	Red Bank Avenue, Tacoma Boulevard	Delsea Drive Route 47) in West Deptford Township	
CR 645	1.07	1.72	Clements Bridge Road (CR 544) in Deptford Township	Caufield Avenue	Turkey Hill Road near the New Jersey Turnpike bridge in Deptford Township	
CR 646	0.73	1.17	Tacoma Boulevard (CR 644) in Deptford Township	Deptford Avenue	Delsea Drive (Route 47) in Deptford Township	
CR 647	1.92	3.09	Tanyard Road (CR 663) in Deptford Township	Bankbridge Road, Fox Run Road	Good Intent Road (CR 534) in Deptford Township	
CR 648	1.89	3.04	Kings Highway (CR 551) in West Deptford Township	Ogden Station Road	Mantua Pike (Route 45) in West Deptford Township	
CR 649	0.48	0.77	South Evergreen Avenue (CR 650) in Woodbury	South Barber Avenue	Barber Avenue (CR 663) in Woodbury	
CR 650	0.51	0.82	Mantua Pike (Route 45) in Woodbury Heights	South Evergreen Avenue	Woodbury–Glassboro Road (CR 553) and South Evergreen Avenue (CR 553) in Woodbury	
CR 651	5.03	8.10	Delsea Drive (Route 47) in Glassboro	Greentree Road	Black Horse Pike (Route 42) in Washington Township	
CR 652	0.74	1.19	Mantua Pike (Route 45) in Woodbury Heights	Elm Avenue	Woodbury–Glassboro Road (CR 553) in Woodbury Heights	
CR 653	7.69	12.38	Kings Highway (CR 551) in Woolwich Township	Paulsboro Road, Swedesboro–Paulsboro Road, Billingsport Road	North Delaware Street on the Greenwich Township/Paulsboro border	
CR 654	8.06	12.97	Sicklerville Road (US 322), Glassboro–Williamstown Road (US 322), Main Street (CR 536), and Clayton Avenue (CR 610) in Monroe Township	Main Street, Hurffville–Cross Keys Road	Delsea Drive (Route 47) in Washington Township	
CR 655	10.19	16.40	Delsea Drive (Route 47) in Franklin Township	Fries Mill Road	Black Horse Pike (Route 42) in Washington Township	
CR 656	3.75	6.04	Crown Point Road (Route 44) on the West Deptford Township/Deptford Township township line	Mantua Grove Road, Parkville Station Road	Mantua Pike (Route 45) in West Deptford Township	
CR 657	0.91	1.46	Delsea Drive (Route 47) in Franklin Township	Veterans Way, Blackwood Avenue	Fries Mill Road (CR 655) in Franklin Township	
CR 658	4.22	6.79	Chapel Heights Road (CR 639) in Washington Township	Pitman–Downer Road	Fries Mill Road (CR 655) in Monroe Township	
CR 659	6.23	10.03	Tuckahoe Road (CR 555/CR 557) and Marshall Hill Road (CR 555) in Monroe Township	West Malaga Road, East Malaga Road	Malaga Road (CR 536) and New Brooklyn Road (CR 536) in Monroe Township	
CR 660	1.31	2.11	Grove Street (CR 643) and Friars Boulevard (CR 660) in West Deptford Township	Jessup Road	Kings Highway (CR 551) in West Deptford Township	
CR 661	1.46	2.35	Salem Avenue at the Cumberland County line in Newfield	Salem Avenue, Catawba Avenue, Madison Avenue	Harding Highway (US 40) on the Newfield/Franklin Township border	
CR 662	4.77	7.68	US 130 in Logan Township	High Hill Road	Auburn Road (CR 551) in Woolwich Township	
CR 663	5.19	8.35	Blackwood–Barnsboro Road (CR 603) in Deptford Township	Tanyard Road, East Barber Avenue	South Broad Street (Route 45/CR 551) in Woodbury	
CR 664	4.27	6.87	Tomlin Station Road (CR 607) in East Greenwich Township	Wolfert Station Road	North Main Street (Route 45) in Harrison Township	
CR 665	1.61	2.59	Woodbury–Glassboro Road (CR 553) on the Deptford Township/Wenonah border	Cattell Road	Delsea Drive (Route 47) in Deptford Township	
CR 667	15.09	24.29	Elk Road (CR 538) in Elk Township	Aura Road, Richwood–Aura Road, Mullica Hill Road, Cedar Road, Cohawkin Road, South Delaware Street	Broad Street (Route 44) in Paulsboro	
CR 668	3.97	6.39	Woodstown Road (CR 605) and Davidson Road (CR 614) in Woolwich Township	Harrisonville Road, Swedesboro–Harrisonville Road	Main Street (CR 617) and Mullica Hill Road (CR 617) in South Harrison Township	
CR 669	1.57	2.53	US 322 on the Logan/Woolwich township line	Stone Meetinghouse Road	Paulsboro Road (CR 653) and Swedesboro–Paulsboro Road (CR 653) on the Logan/Woolwich township line	
CR 670	1.43	2.30	Oak Grove Road (CR 671) in Logan Township	Hendrickson Mill Road	Paulsboro Road (CR 653) in Logan Township	
CR 671	4.18	6.73	Auburn Road (CR 551) in Swedesboro	Locke Avenue, Oak Grove Road	Main Street (Route 44) in Logan Township	
CR 672	0.69	1.11	Kings Highway (CR 551) in Woolwich Township	Pancoast Road	US 322 in Woolwich Township	
CR 673	5.86	9.43	West Broad Street (Route 44) and Tomlin Station Road (CR 607) in Greenwich Township	Cedar Road, Democrat Road	Cohawkin Road (CR 667) in Mantua Township	
CR 674	0.77	1.24	Odgen Station Road (CR 648) in West Deptford Township	Pelham Drive	Pelham Drive (CR 674) in West Deptford Township	
CR 675	1.10	1.77	Mantua Road (CR 678), Kings Highway (CR 551) in Mount Royal	County House Road	Shady Lane Road (CR 707) and Institution Road in Clarksboro	
CR 676 (1)	2.84	4.57	Woodbury–Glassboro Road (CR 553) in Mantua Township	Mantua Boulevard	Mantua Boulevard (CR 632) and Norris Street (CR 709) in Mantua Township	
CR 676 (2)	0.63	1.01	Lambs Road (CR 635) in Mantua Township	Church Road	Dead end in Mantua Township	
CR 678	6.39	10.28	Broad Street (Route 44) on the Greenwich Township/Paulsboro line	Berkley Road, Mantua Road, Harrison Avenue, Mount Royal Road	Main Street (CR 553 Alt.) in Mantua Township	
CR 680	2.85	4.59	Democrat Road (CR 673) in East Greenwich Township	Harmony Road	Broad Street (Route 44) in Greenwich Township	
CR 681	0.06	0.10	Good Intent Road (CR 534) and Church Street (CR 534) in Washington Township	Good Intent Road	Good Intent Road (CR 681) at the Camden County line in Washington Township	
CR 682	2.33	3.75	Main Street (CR 553) in Glassboro	Cedar Avenue, Carpenter Street	West Holly Avenue (CR 624) in Pitman	
CR 684	3.73	6.00	West Broad Street (Route 44) in Logan Township	Repaupo Station Road, Asbury Station Road	Kings Highway (CR 551) in Woolwich Township	
CR 689	5.47	8.80	Delsea Drive (Route 47/US 322) in Glassboro	East New Street, Cross Keys–Glassboro Road, Cross Keys Bypass, Berlin–Cross Keys Road	Berlin–Cross Keys Road (CR 689) at the Camden County line on the Monroe/Washington township line	
CR 694	7.39	11.89	Auburn Road (CR 551) and Kings Highway (CR 551/CR 605) in Swedesboro	Lake Avenue, Franklin Street, Monroeville Road	Swedesboro Road (CR 666) at the Salem County line in South Harrison Township	
CR 705	1.14	1.83	Sicklerville Road (CR 705) at the Camden County line in Washington Township	Sicklerville Road, Woodbury–Turnersville Road	Woodbury–Turnersville Road (CR 707) at the Camden County line in Washington Township	
CR 706	1.59	2.56	Cooper Street (CR 534) and Good Intent Road (CR 534) in Deptford Township	Cooper Street	Almonesseon Road (CR 706) at the Camden County line in Deptford Township	
CR 707	0.26	0.42	Kings Highway (CR 551) in East Greenwich Township	Shady Lane Road	County House Road in East Greenwich Township	
CR 708	0.40	0.64	Barber Avenue (CR 649) in Woodbury	Railroad Avenue	Cooper Street in Woodbury	
CR 709	0.11	0.18	Main Street (CR 553 Alt.) in Mantua Township	Norris Street	Mantua Boulevard (CR 632/CR 676) and Wenonah Avenue (CR 632) in Mantua Township	
CR 710	0.17	0.27	US 130 in Westville	Crown Point Road	Broadway (Route 47/CR 551) in Westville	
CR 712	1.21	1.95	Blackwood–Barnsboro Road (CR 603) in Deptford Township	Rowan College of South Jersey Entrance	Tanyard Road (CR 663) in Deptford Township	
CR 713	0.26	0.42	Dead end in Washington Township	Atkinson Memorial Park Entrance	Delsea Drive (Route 47) in Washington Township	
CR 715	0.72	1.16	Tanyard Road (CR 663) in Deptford Township	Salina Road	Bees Branch in Washington Township	
CR 730	0.13	0.21	Mantua Boulevard (CR 676) in Mantua Township	East Morris Avenue	Trenton Avenue in Mantua Township	
CR 757	0.05	0.08	Berkley Road (CR 678) on the Greenwich Township/Paulsboro border	Nemo Avenue	Cohawkin Road (CR 667) on the Greenwich Township/Paulsboro border	
CR 760	0.27	0.43	Woodbury–Glassboro Road (CR 553) in Mantua Township	Timbercrest Drive	Arbour Lane and Arbour Court (CR 761) in Mantua Township	
CR 761	0.19	0.31	Timbercrest Drive (CR 760) in Mantua Township	Arbour Lane, Arbour Court	Dead end in Mantua Township	
