= Greentree Road =

Greentree Road may refer to:

- County Route 674 (Camden County, New Jersey)
- County Route 651 (Gloucester County, New Jersey)
