= County Route 538 (New Jersey) =

County highway in New Jersey, U.S.

County Route 538
- CR 538 highlighted in red

Route information
- Length: 24.10 mi (38.79 km)

Major junctions
- West end: CR 551 in Swedesboro
- Route 45 in South Harrison Township; CR 581 in South Harrison Township; Route 77 in Elk Township; CR 553 in Elk Township; Route 47 in Franklin Township; CR 555 in Franklin Township
- East end: US 322 in Monroe Township

Location
- Country: United States
- State: New Jersey
- Counties: Gloucester

Highway system
- County routes in New Jersey; 500-series routes
← CR 537	→ CR 539

County Route 538 (CR 538) is a county highway in the U.S. state of New Jersey. The highway extends 24.10 miles (38.79 km) from Kings Highway (CR 551) in Swedesboro to Black Horse Pike (U.S. Route 322) in Monroe Township.

== Route description ==
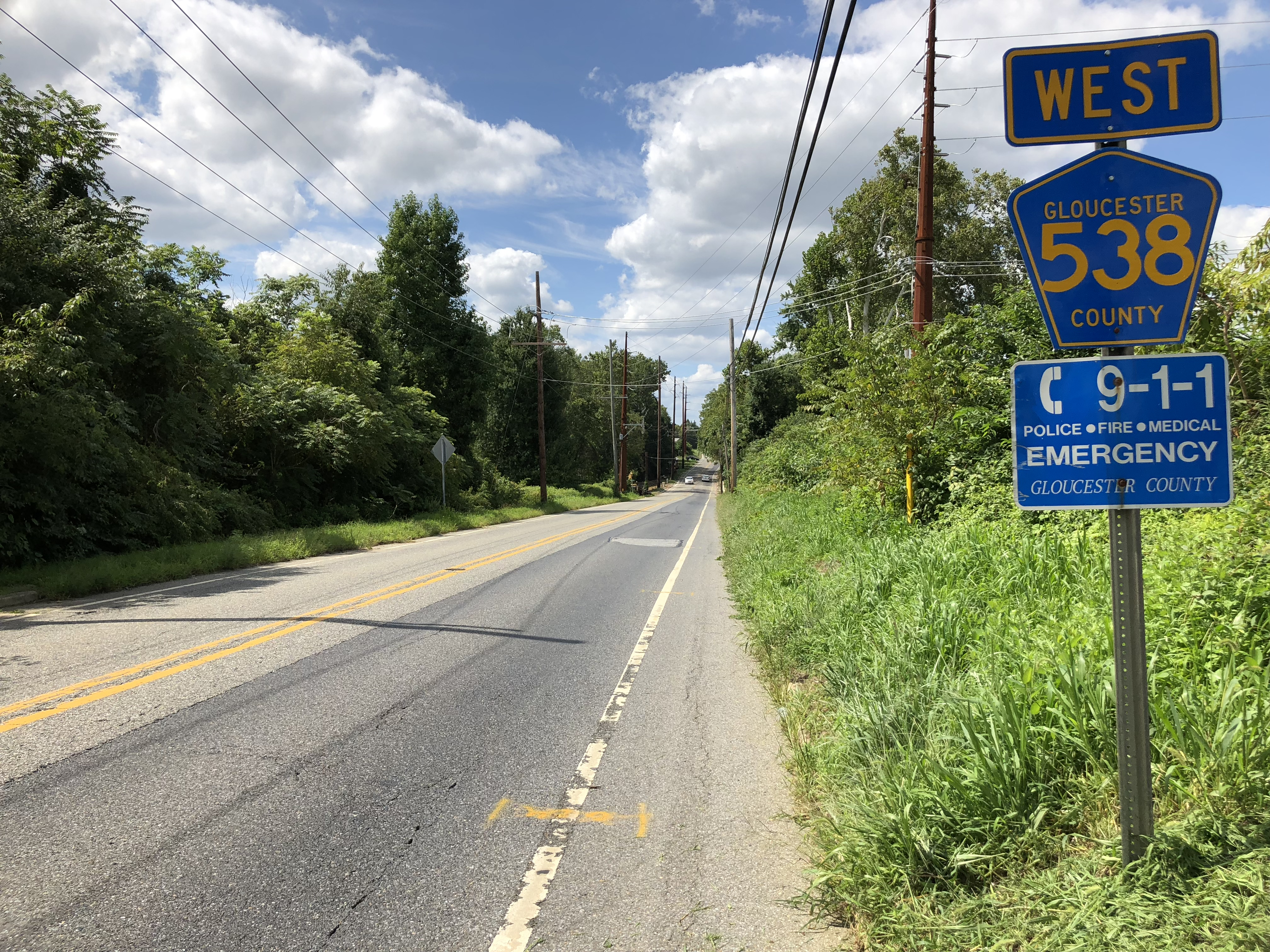
View west along CR 538 at High Street in Woolwich Township

CR 538 begins at an intersection with CR 551 in Swedesboro, Gloucester County, heading southeast on two-lane undivided Glen Echo Avenue through residential areas. The route enters Woolwich Township and forks to the left onto Swedesboro Road, passing over the New Jersey Turnpike. The road continues into a mix of farmland and woodland, intersecting CR 614 before crossing into South Harrison Township. In this area, CR 538 crosses CR 607 before entering areas of increasing residential subdivisions as it comes to Route 45. Past this junction, the route enters more forested areas of residential subdivisions with a few farms, crossing CR 581. The road continues into Elk Township and reaches the Route 77 junction.

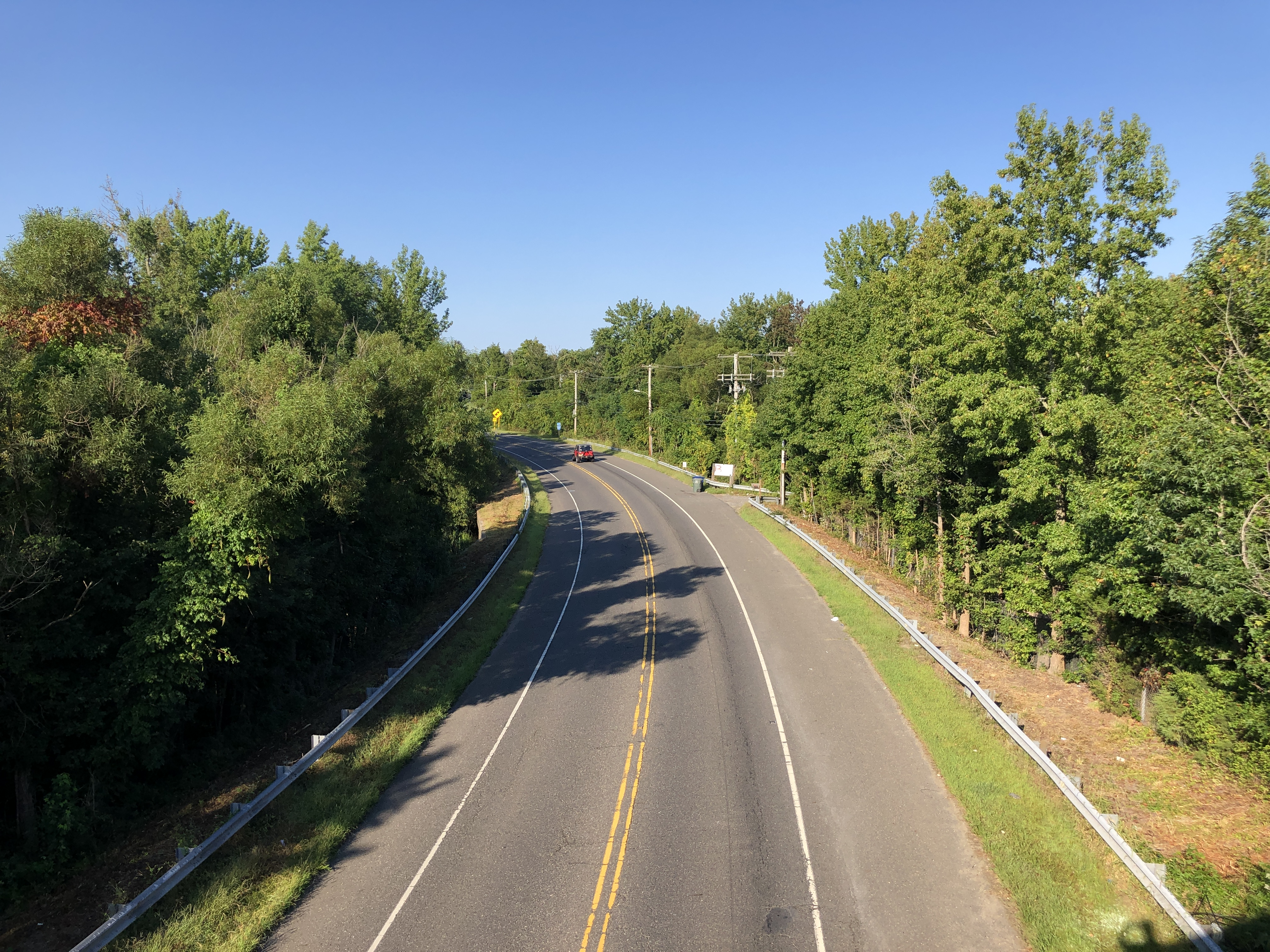
View westbound along CR 538 from Route 55 in Franklin Township

Here, CR 538 becomes Elk Road passes through a mix of woods, farms, and some development as it intersects CR 641 and CR 616. Farther east, the route crosses CR 619 and CR 609 before turning east into a patch of woods. The road runs through agricultural areas as it comes to junctions with CR 553 and CR 667. From here, CR 538 turns more southeast and continues through farmland and woodland with a few residences, entering Franklin Township and becoming Swedesboro Road. Upon intersecting CR 604, the route turns east and passes under the Route 55 freeway before passing through wooded residential areas. CR 538 crosses over Conrail Shared Assets Operations' Vineland Secondary before entering commercial areas and coming to the Route 47 and CR 613 junction. The road becomes Coles Mill Road and passes more homes in the community of Franklinville, intersecting CR 657, CR 655, and CR 612. After leaving Franklinville, CR 538 runs east through more forested areas with residences, crossing CR 555 and CR 659. CR 538 continues, crossing CR 633, then into Monroe Township and turns north at Cranes Lake, coming to its eastern terminus at US 322 (Black Horse Pike).

== Major intersections ==
The entire route is in Gloucester County.

Location	mi	km	Destinations	Notes
Swedesboro	0.00	0.00	CR 551 (Kings Highway) – Woodstown, Glassboro, Woodbury	Western terminus
South Harrison Township	3.98	6.41	Route 45 (Woodstown-Mullica Hill Road) – Mullica Hill, Woodstown	
South Harrison Township	5.29	8.51	CR 581 (Commissioners Road)	
Elk Township	7.27	11.70	Route 77 (Bridgeton Pike) – Mullica Hill, Bridgeton	
Elk Township	12.41	19.97	CR 553 (Buck Road) to Route 55 – Glassboro, Bridgeton	
Franklin Township	15.49	24.93	Route 47 (Delsea Drive) – Glassboro, Vineland	
Franklin Township	19.79	31.85	CR 555 (Tuckahoe Road)	
Monroe Township	24.10	38.79	US 322 (Black Horse Pike) – Williamstown, Atlantic City	Eastern terminus
1.000 mi = 1.609 km; 1.000 km = 0.621 mi
