= County Route 536 (New Jersey) =

County highway in New Jersey, U.S.

County Route 536
- CR 536 highlighted in red and CR 536 Spur in blue

Route information
- Length: 38.79 mi (62.43 km)

Major junctions
- West end: US 322 at the Pennsylvania state line in Logan Township
- US 130 in Logan Township; I-295 in Logan Township; N.J. Turnpike in Woolwich Township; Route 45 in Harrison Township; Route 55 in Harrison Township; Route 47 in Glassboro; US 322 in Monroe Township; Route 73 in Winslow Township; US 30 in Winslow Township
- East end: US 206 in Hammonton

Location
- Country: United States
- State: New Jersey
- Counties: Gloucester, Camden, Atlantic

Highway system
- County routes in New Jersey; 500-series routes
← CR 535	→ CR 537

County Route 536 (CR 536) is a county highway in the U.S. state of New Jersey. The highway extends 39 miles (63 km) from the Commodore Barry Bridge crossing the Delaware River at Chester at the Pennsylvania state line and Logan Township, to U.S. Route 206 (US 206) in Hammonton. Much of the western portion of the route is concurrent with US 322 though it is unsigned along this portion.

== Route description ==
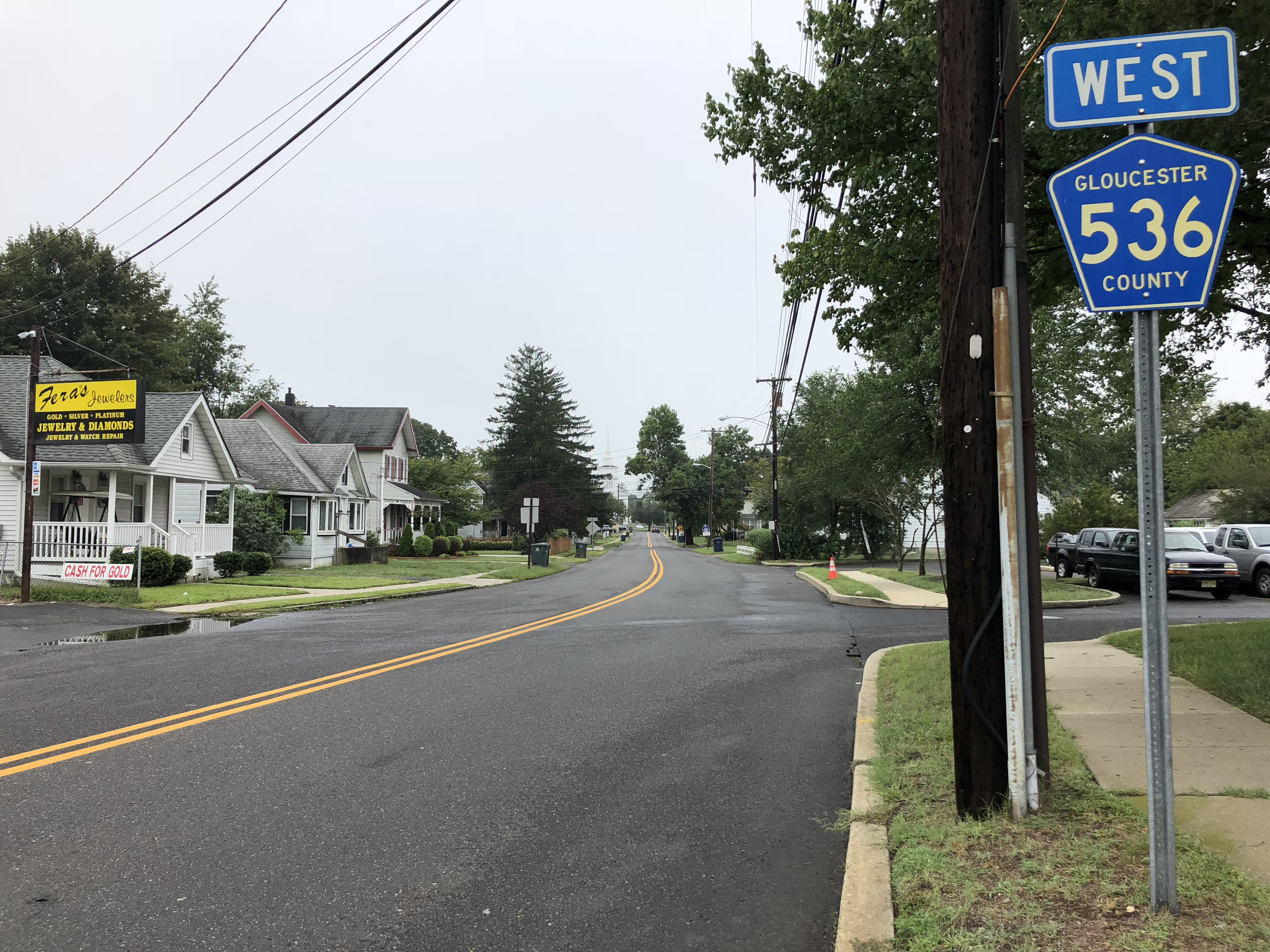
View west along CR 536 at US 322 (Black Horse Pike) in Williamstown

The western 24 1/2 mi (39.4 km) of CR 536 is mostly unsigned and concurrent with other routes, running from the Commodore Barry Bridge over the Delaware River in Logan Township east to Monroe Township in Gloucester County. The county route starts along US 322 as a freeway that interchanges with US 130 before turning into a two-lane undivided road that comes to I-295. In Woolwich Township, the road intersects CR 551 and the New Jersey Turnpike. US 322/CR 536 continue east to the community of Mullica Hill in Harrison Township, where it intersects Route 45. Here, CR 536 heads south with Route 45 and US 322 Bus. while US 322 bypasses Mullica Hill to the northeast along CR 536A. CR 536 and US 322 Bus. split from Route 45 and head east, intersecting US 322/CR 536A again. CR 536 becomes concurrent with US 322 again and continues east. Farther east in Harrison Township is an interchange with the Route 55 freeway. In Glassboro, the road intersects CR 553 and runs concurrent with Route 47. The road continues into Monroe Township where it crosses CR 555.

CR 536 splits from US 322 in the Monroe Township community of Williamstown at an intersection with CR 610 and CR 654. The route heads southeast on two-lane undivided Main Street into residential and commercial areas. The route turns northeast onto Poplar Avenue and crosses US 322 (Black Horse Pike). Past this intersection, CR 536 becomes New Brooklyn Road and passes through inhabited areas. Upon intersecting CR 659, the route turns north onto Malaga Road and enters wooded areas, crossing the Four Mile River into Winslow Township, Camden County and passing over the Atlantic City Expressway. At an intersection with CR 705, CR 536 turns east onto Cedarbrook Road and crosses the Great Egg Harbor River near New Brooklyn Lake. After the CR 720 junction, the route runs through a mix of homes and farm fields. After an intersection with CR 561C, CR 536 becomes Cedar Brook Road and crosses Conrail Shared Assets Operations' Beesleys Point Secondary railroad line before turning northeast and coming to the Route 73/CR 561 junction.

A short distance later, the route turns east onto Pump Branch Road and continues through farmland and residential subdivisions, intersecting CR 718. CR 536 intersects US 30 and forms a brief concurrency with that route on four-lane undivided White Horse Pike before heading northeast onto two-lane Pennington Avenue. The road runs through residential areas and crosses NJ Transit's Atlantic City Line. The route continues into Waterford Township and crosses CR 718, at which point CR 536 becomes Chew Road and heads east-southeast into agricultural areas with some homes before entering the densely forested Pine Barrens. Farther east, the road crosses an abandoned railroad line. The route passes an agricultural clearing before crossing back into the forests and coming into Hammonton in Atlantic County, where CR 536 ends at US 206.

== Major intersections ==
County	Location	mi	km	Destinations	Notes
Delaware	Chester	0.00	0.00	US 322 west – Pennsylvania	Continuation into Pennsylvania; western end of US 322 concurrency
Delaware River		0.00	0.00	Commodore Barry Bridge (westbound toll; cash or E-ZPass)	
Gloucester	Logan Township	2.18	3.51	US 130 to I-295 north / Route 44 – Penns Grove, Trenton, Camden	Interchange
Gloucester	Logan Township	3.94	6.34	I-295	Exit 11 on I-295; no eastbound access to I-295 north
Gloucester	Woolwich Township	6.99	11.25	CR 551 (Kings Highway) – Woodbury, Swedesboro	
Gloucester	Woolwich Township	7.81	12.57	N.J. Turnpike – New York City, Wilmington	Exit 2 on N.J. Turnpike
Gloucester	Harrison Township	10.82	17.41	US 322 east (CR 536A east / Mullica Hill Bypass) / Route 45 north (North Main Street) to Route 55 – Shore Points, Glassboro, Woodbury US 322 Bus. begins	Eastern end of US 322 concurrency; western end of US 322 Bus./Route 45 concurrency
Gloucester	Harrison Township	11.36	18.28	Route 45 south (South Main Street) to Route 77 – Woodstown, Salem	Eastern end of Route 45 concurrency
Gloucester	Harrison Township	12.53	20.17	US 322 west (CR 536A west / Mullica Hill Bypass) to N.J. Turnpike – Jefferson, Commodore Barry Bridge US 322 Bus. ends	Eastern terminus of US 322 Bus.; western end of US 322 concurrency
Gloucester	Harrison Township	15.45	24.86	Route 55 – Malaga, Bellmawr	Exits 50A-B on Route 55
Gloucester	Glassboro	17.96	28.90	CR 553 (Main Street)	
Gloucester	Glassboro	18.08	29.10	Route 47 north (Delsea Drive)	Western end of Route 47 concurrency
Gloucester	Glassboro	18.46	29.71	Route 47 south (Delsea Drive) / CR 641 (High Street)	Eastern end of Route 47 concurrency
Gloucester	Monroe Township	23.28	37.47	CR 555 (North Tuckahoe Road) – Cross Keys, Vineland	
Gloucester	Monroe Township	24.51	39.45	US 322 east (Sicklerville Road) to CR 536 Spur / CR 610 (Clayton Avenue) / CR 654 (Main Street)	Eastern end of US 322 concurrency
Gloucester	Monroe Township	24.88	40.04	US 322 (Black Horse Pike) – Glassboro, Atlantic City	
Camden	Winslow Township	30.36	48.86	South Cedarbrook Road (CR 561C south)	
Camden	Winslow Township	30.45	49.00	Route 73 / CR 561 – Berlin, Folsom	
Camden	Winslow Township	32.74	52.69	US 30 west (White Horse Pike) – Camden	Western end of US 30 concurrency
Camden	Winslow Township	32.82	52.82	US 30 east (White Horse Pike) – Hammonton	Eastern end of US 30 concurrency
Atlantic	Hammonton	38.79	62.43	US 206 – Trenton, Hammonton	Eastern terminus
1.000 mi = 1.609 km; 1.000 km = 0.621 mi: Concurrency terminus; Incomplete access; Tolled

== CR 536 Spur ==
County Route 536 Spur
- Location: Monroe Township–Winslow Township
- Length: 7.95 mi (12.79 km)

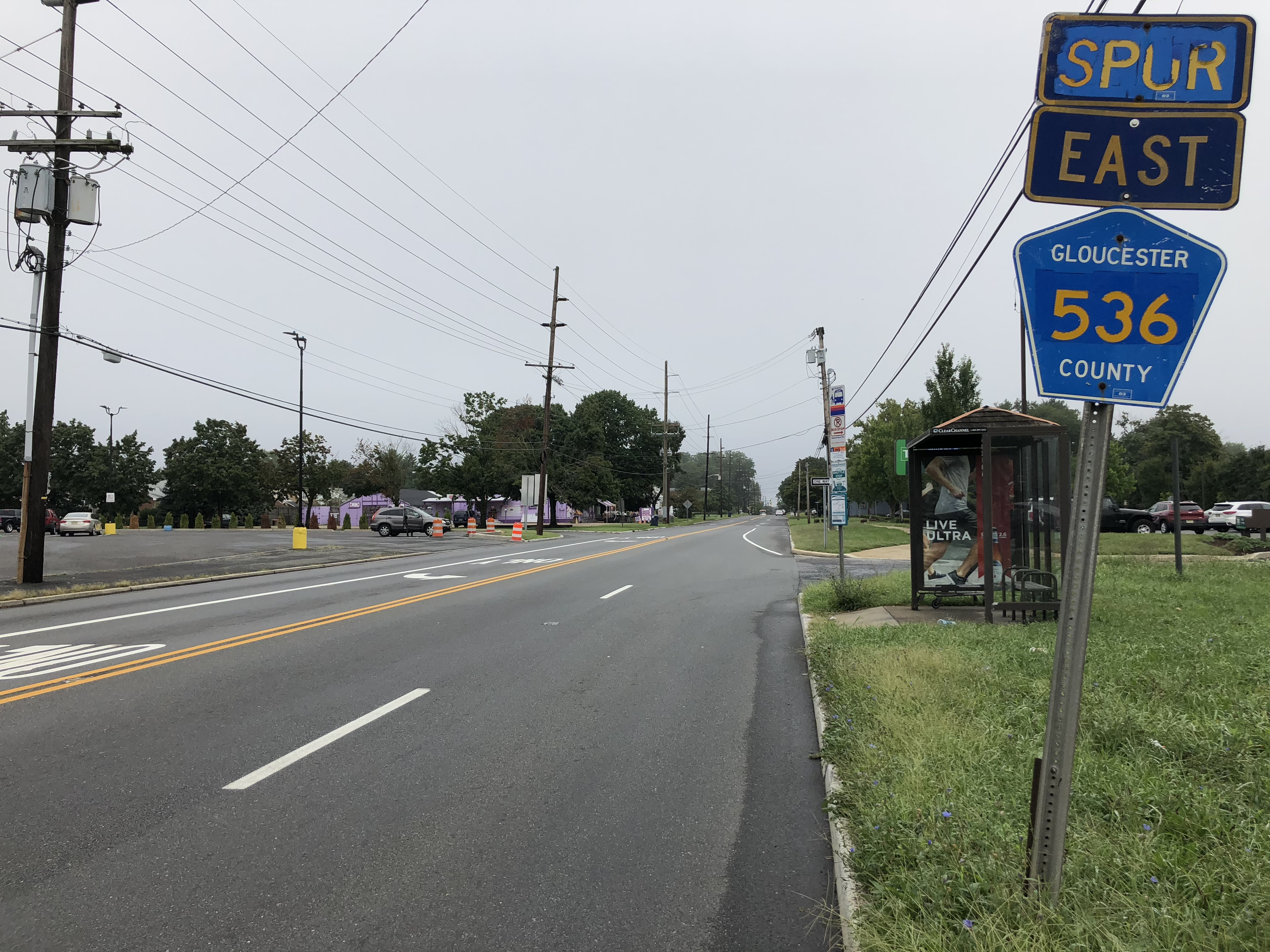
View east along CR 536 Spur at US 322 and Route 42 in Williamstown

County Route 536 Spur, abbreviated CR 536 Spur, is a special county highway in New Jersey. The highway extends a total of 7.95 miles (12.79 km) from Black Horse Pike (US 322 / Route 42) in Williamstown, Monroe Township to US 30 on the border of Waterford Township and Berlin. It is known locally in Sicklerville, Winslow Township as Williamstown Road, and in Williamstown as Sicklerville Road. A second smaller segment runs along Hopewell Road on the border of Waterford Township and Berlin Township from Jackson Road (CR 534) to the Burlington County line where the road continues into Evesham Township as Hopewell Road.

Major intersections

County	Location	mi	km	Destinations	Notes
Gloucester	Monroe Township	0.00	0.00	US 322 (Sicklerville Road) / Route 42 north (Black Horse Pike)	Southern terminus; southern terminus of Route 42
Camden	Winslow Township	1.54	2.48	A.C. Expressway – Philadelphia, Atlantic City	Exit 38 on A.C. Expressway
Camden	Winslow Township	6.76	10.88	CR 561 (Tansboro Road) – Folsom, Atlantic City, Wildwood	
Camden	Winslow Township	7.41	11.93	Route 73 south to A.C. Expressway	Interchange
Camden	Waterford Township–Berlin line	7.57	12.18	US 30 east (White Horse Pike)	Northern terminus
Camden	Gap in route				
Camden	Waterford–Berlin township line	8.25	13.28	CR 534 (Jackson Road)	Southern terminus
Camden	Waterford–Berlin township line	8.63	13.89	Hopewell Road	Continuation into Burlington County
1.000 mi = 1.609 km; 1.000 km = 0.621 mi: Tolled
