= Harrison Township, New Jersey =

Township in Gloucester County, New Jersey, US

- Township
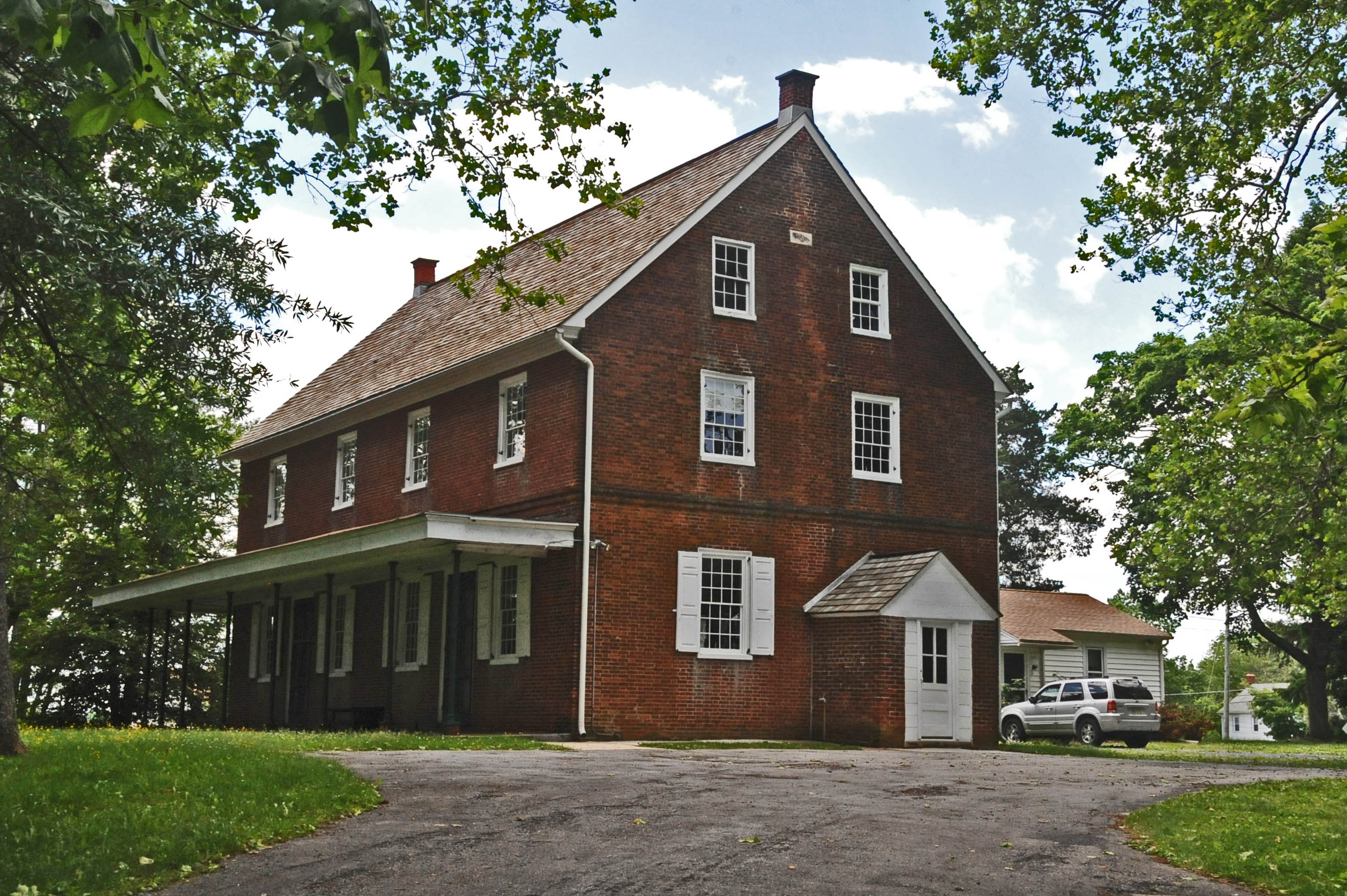
- Friends Meetinghouse in Mullica Hill, New Jersey

- Seal

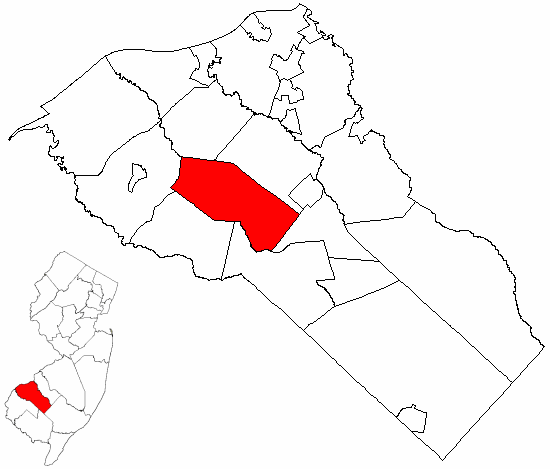
- Location of Harrison Township in Gloucester County highlighted in red (right). Inset map: Location of Gloucester County in New Jersey highlighted in red (left).

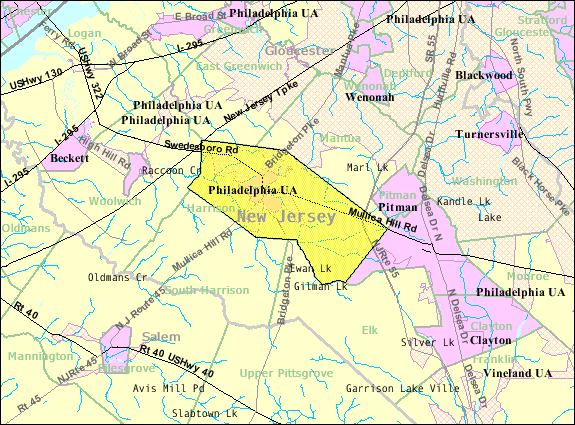
- Census Bureau map of Harrison Township, New Jersey

- Location in Gloucester County Location in New Jersey Location in the United States
- Coordinates: 39.726722°N 75.20553°W
- Country: United States
- State: New Jersey
- County: Gloucester
- Incorporated: March 13, 1844 as Spicer Township
- Renamed: April 1, 1845 as Harrison Township
- Named for: William Henry Harrison

Government
  - Type: Township
  - Body: Township Committee
  - Mayor: J. Adam Wingate (R, term ends December 31, 2025)
  - Administrator: Dennis Chambers
  - Municipal clerk: Julie Cundey

Area
  - Total: 19.02 sq mi (49.25 km^{2})
  - Land: 18.93 sq mi (49.03 km^{2})
  - Water: 0.085 sq mi (0.22 km^{2}) 0.44%
  - Rank: 148th of 565 in state 7th of 24 in county
- Elevation: 46 ft (14 m)

Population (2020)
  - Total: 13,641
  - Estimate (2023): 13,806
  - Rank: 189th of 565 in state 8th of 24 in county
  - Density: 720.5/sq mi (278.2/km^{2})
  - Rank: 417th of 565 in state 18th of 24 in county
- Time zone: UTC−05:00 (Eastern (EST))
  - Summer (DST): UTC−04:00 (Eastern (EDT))
- ZIP Code: 08062 – Mullica Hill
- Area code: 856
- FIPS code: 3401530180
- GNIS feature ID: 0882146
- Website: www.harrisontwp.us

Harrison Township is a township in Gloucester County in the U.S. state of New Jersey. As of the 2020 United States census, the township's population was 13,641, an increase of 1,224 (+9.9%) from the 2010 census count of 12,417, which in turn reflected an increase of 3,629 (+41.3%) from the 8,788 counted in the 2000 census.

Harrison Township was originally formed as Spicer Township by an act of the New Jersey Legislature on March 13, 1844, from portions of Greenwich Township and Woolwich Township. That name lasted for less than a year, with Harrison Township adopted as of April 1, 1845. The township was named for President William Henry Harrison. Mullica Hill is the historical center of the Township.

From Prohibition until 2018, Harrison Township had been a dry township, where alcohol could not be sold. The township's voters passed a referendum in 2009 permitting alcohol by consumption in restaurants. A second referendum was passed by the voters in 2015 allowing sales of packaged alcoholic goods in liquor stores. The first liquor store opened in November 2018 and the first bar opened in July 2019.

== Geography ==
According to the U.S. Census Bureau, the township had a total area of 19.02 square miles (49.25 km^{2}), including 18.93 square miles (49.03 km^{2}) of land and 0.08 square miles (0.22 km^{2}) of water (0.44%).

Mullica Hill is an unincorporated community and census-designated place (CDP) located within Harrison Township that had a 2010 Census population of 3,982. Richwood is a CDP that is in portions of both Harrison Township and Mantua Township, which had a 2010 population of 3,459, of which 3,400 were in Harrison Township and 59 in Mantua Township. Other unincorporated communities, localities and place names located partially or completely within the township include Ewan, Ewans Mills, Heritage, Jefferson, and Sherwin.

The township borders the Gloucester County municipalities of East Greenwich Township, Elk Township, Glassboro, Mantua Township, South Harrison Township, and Woolwich Township.

Multiple homes were destroyed when the area was hit by an EF3 tornado on September 1, 2021, produced by the remnants of Hurricane Ida.

== Demographics ==
Historical population
Census	Pop.	Note	%±
1850	1,984		—
1860	2,544		28.2%
1870	3,038		19.4%
1880	2,841		−6.5%
1890	1,545		−45.6%
1900	1,569		1.6%
1910	1,682		7.2%
1920	1,633		−2.9%
1930	1,827		11.9%
1940	1,805		−1.2%
1950	2,225		23.3%
1960	2,410		8.3%
1970	2,661		10.4%
1980	3,585		34.7%
1990	4,715		31.5%
2000	8,788		86.4%
2010	12,417		41.3%
2020	13,641		9.9%
2023 (est.)	13,806		1.2%
Population sources: 1850–2000; 1850–1920 1850–1870; 1850 1870 1880–1890; 1890–1910 1910–1930; 1940–2000 2000; 2010 2020

=== 2010 census ===
The 2010 United States census counted 12,417 people, 3,942 households, and 3,315 families in the township. The population density was 648.7 inhabitants per square mile (250.5/km^{2}). There were 4,089 housing units at an average density of 213.6 per square mile (82.5/km^{2}). The racial makeup was 90.57% (11,246) White, 3.83% (475) Black or African American, 0.09% (11) Native American, 3.38% (420) Asian, 0.00% (0) Pacific Islander, 0.48% (59) from other races, and 1.66% (206) from two or more races. Hispanic or Latino of any race were 3.01% (374) of the population.

Of the 3,942 households, 49.9% had children under the age of 18; 72.7% were married couples living together; 7.9% had a female householder with no husband present and 15.9% were non-families. Of all households, 13.3% were made up of individuals and 5.4% had someone living alone who was 65 years of age or older. The average household size was 3.15 and the average family size was 3.47.

31.8% of the population were under the age of 18, 7.5% from 18 to 24, 22.8% from 25 to 44, 29.6% from 45 to 64, and 8.4% who were 65 years of age or older. The median age was 38.1 years. For every 100 females, the population had 95.9 males. For every 100 females ages 18 and older there were 94.2 males.

The Census Bureau's 2006–2010 American Community Survey showed that (in 2010 inflation-adjusted dollars) median household income was $102,162 (with a margin of error of +/− $10,851) and the median family income was $121,366 (+/− $9,400). Males had a median income of $88,157 (+/− $6,618) versus $47,857 (+/− $10,273) for females. The per capita income for the borough was $36,354 (+/− $2,640). About 5.0% of families and 5.5% of the population were below the poverty line, including 7.4% of those under age 18 and 2.8% of those age 65 or over.

=== 2000 census ===
As of the 2000 United States census, there were 8,788 people, 2,848 households, and 2,323 families residing in the township. The population density was 459.3 inhabitants per square mile (177.3/km^{2}). There were 2,939 housing units at an average density of 153.6 per square mile (59.3/km^{2}). The racial makeup of the township was 95.16% White, 2.96% African American, 0.13% Native American, 0.73% Asian, 0.41% from other races, and 0.61% from two or more races. Hispanic or Latino of any race were 1.78% of the population.

There were 2,848 households, out of which 49.9% had children under the age of 18 living with them, 71.8% were married couples living together, 7.3% had a female householder with no husband present, and 18.4% were non-families. 15.3% of all households were made up of individuals, and 5.0% had someone living alone who was 65 years of age or older. The average household size was 3.06 and the average family size was 3.44.

In the township, the population was spread out, with 33.2% under the age of 18, 5.6% from 18 to 24, 33.7% from 25 to 44, 20.8% from 45 to 64, and 6.6% who were 65 years of age or older. The median age was 35 years. For every 100 females, there were 98.5 males. For every 100 females age 18 and over, there were 95.5 males.

The median income for a household in the township was $77,143, and the median income for a family was $84,379. Males had a median income of $61,770 versus $39,583 for females. The per capita income for the township was $28,645. About 2.1% of families and 3.2% of the population were below the poverty line, including 2.5% of those under age 18 and 7.7% of those age 65 or over.

== Government ==
=== Local government ===
Harrison Township is governed under the Township form of New Jersey municipal government, one of 141 municipalities (of the 564) statewide that use this form, the second-most commonly used form of government in the state. The Township Committee is comprised of five members, who are elected directly by the voters at-large in partisan elections to serve three-year terms of office on a staggered basis, with either one or two seats coming up for election each year as part of the November general election in a three-year cycle. At an annual reorganization meeting held each January, the Township Committee selects one of its members to serve as Mayor and another as Deputy Mayor, each serving a one-year term.

As of 2025, the members of the Harrison Township Committee are Mayor J. Adam Wingate (R, term on committee ends December 31, 2027; term as mayor ends 2025), Deputy Mayor Lawrence Moore (R, term on committee and as deputy mayor ends 2025), Thomas "TJ" Coakley (R, 2027), Kevin French (R, 2026) and Jeffrey Jacques (R, 2025).

=== Federal, state, and county representation ===
Harrison Township is located in the 2nd Congressional District and is part of New Jersey's 3rd state legislative district.

For the 119th United States Congress, New Jersey's 2nd congressional district is represented by Jeff Van Drew (R, Dennis Township). New Jersey is represented in the United States Senate by Democrats Cory Booker (Newark, term ends 2027) and Andy Kim (Moorestown, term ends 2031).

For the 2026–2027 session, the 3rd legislative district of the New Jersey Legislature is represented in the State Senate by John Burzichelli (D, Paulsboro) and in the General Assembly by David Bailey (D, Woodstown) and Heather Simmons (D, Glassboro).

Gloucester County is governed by a board of county commissioners, whose seven members are elected at-large to three-year terms of office on a staggered basis in partisan elections, with either two or three seats coming up for election each year. At a reorganization meeting held each January, the Board selects a Director and a Deputy Director from among its members. As of 2025, Gloucester County's Commissioners are:

Director Frank J. DiMarco (D, Deptford Township, 2025), Matt Weng (D, Pitman, 2026), Joann Gattinelli (D, Washington Township, 2026), Nicholas DeSilvio (R, Franklin Township, 2027), Denice DiCarlo (D, West Deptford Township, 2025) Deputy Director Jim Jefferson (D, Woodbury, 2026) and Christopher Konawel Jr. (R, Glassboro, 2027).

Gloucester County's constitutional officers are: Clerk James N. Hogan (D, Franklin Township; 2027), Sheriff Carmel Morina (D, Greenwich Township; 2027) and Surrogate Giuseppe "Joe" Chila (D, Woolwich Township; 2028).

=== Politics ===
United States presidential election results for Harrison Township 2024 2020 2016 2012 2008 2004
Year	Republican		Democratic		Third party(ies)	
Year	No.	%	No.	%	No.	%
2024	4,465	55.36%	3,469	43.01%	131	1.62%
2020	4,451	52.62%	3,873	45.79%	135	1.60%
2016	3,706	54.80%	2,786	41.19%	271	4.01%
2012	3,561	56.94%	2,612	41.77%	81	1.30%
2008	3,280	52.78%	2,867	46.13%	68	1.09%
2004	3,039	58.30%	2,132	40.90%	42	0.81%

As of March 2011, there were a total of 7,889 registered voters in Harrison Township, of which 1,903 (24.1%) were registered as Democrats, 2,533 (32.1%) were registered as Republicans and 3,447 (43.7%) were registered as Unaffiliated. There were 6 voters registered as Libertarians or Greens.

In the 2012 presidential election, Republican Mitt Romney received 56.9% of the vote (3,561 cast), ahead of Democrat Barack Obama with 41.8% (2,612 votes), and other candidates with 1.3% (81 votes), among the 6,292 ballots cast by the township's 8,439 registered voters (38 ballots were spoiled), for a turnout of 74.6%. In the 2008 presidential election, Republican John McCain received 52.3% of the vote (3,280 cast), ahead of Democrat Barack Obama with 45.7% (2,867 votes) and other candidates with 1.1% (68 votes), among the 6,273 ballots cast by the township's 7,975 registered voters, for a turnout of 78.7%. In the 2004 presidential election, Republican George W. Bush received 58.0% of the vote (3,039 ballots cast), outpolling Democrat John Kerry with 40.7% (2,132 votes) and other candidates with 0.6% (42 votes), among the 5,236 ballots cast by the township's 6,540 registered voters, for a turnout percentage of 80.1.

Gubernatorial election results for Harrison Township
Year	Republican		Democratic		Third party(ies)	
Year	No.	%	No.	%	No.	%
2025	3,476	53.98%	2,928	45.47%	35	0.54%
2021	3,066	60.35%	1,971	38.80%	43	0.85%
2017	2,183	54.67%	1,714	42.93%	96	2.40%
2013	2,515	73.84%	839	24.63%	52	1.53%
2009	2,214	60.16%	1,178	32.01%	288	7.83%
2005	1,765	57.38%	1,215	39.50%	96	3.12%

In the 2013 gubernatorial election, Republican Chris Christie received 73.8% of the vote (2,515 cast), ahead of Democrat Barbara Buono with 24.6% (839 votes), and other candidates with 1.5% (52 votes), among the 3,454 ballots cast by the township's 8,407 registered voters (48 ballots were spoiled), for a turnout of 41.1%. In the 2009 gubernatorial election, Republican Chris Christie received 59.5% of the vote (2,214 ballots cast), ahead of Democrat Jon Corzine with 31.7% (1,178 votes), Independent Chris Daggett with 7.1% (265 votes) and other candidates with 0.6% (23 votes), among the 3,718 ballots cast by the township's 7,900 registered voters, yielding a 47.1% turnout.

United States Senate election results for Harrison Township1
Year	Republican		Democratic		Third party(ies)	
Year	No.	%	No.	%	No.	%
2024	4,310	54.90%	3,457	44.04%	83	1.06%
2018	3,287	58.32%	2,156	38.25%	193	3.42%
2012	3,270	54.49%	2,591	43.18%	140	2.33%
2006	1,958	56.85%	1,402	40.71%	84	2.44%

United States Senate election results for Harrison Township2
Year	Republican		Democratic		Third party(ies)	
Year	No.	%	No.	%	No.	%
2020	4,511	54.17%	3,654	43.88%	163	1.96%
2014	1,692	60.15%	1,067	37.93%	54	1.92%
2013	1,194	61.71%	728	37.62%	13	0.67%
2008	3,300	55.78%	2,484	41.99%	132	2.23%

== Education ==
Harrison Township School District serves students in public school for pre-kindergarten through sixth grade. As of the 2022–23 school year, the district, comprised of two schools, had an enrollment of 1,341 students and 107.8 classroom teachers (on an FTE basis), for a student–teacher ratio of 12.4:1. Schools in the district (with 2022–23 enrollment data from the National Center for Education Statistics) are Harrison Township Elementary School with 770 students in grades PreK-3 and Pleasant Valley School with 568 students in grades 4-6.

Public school students in seventh through twelfth grades attend the schools of the Clearview Regional High School District, which serves students from Harrison Township and Mantua Township. Schools in the high school district (with 2022–23 enrollment data from the National Center for Education Statistics) are Clearview Regional Middle School with 753 students in grades 7-8 and Clearview Regional High School with 1,431 students in grades 9-12. Seats on the high school district's nine-member board are allocated based on population, with four seats assigned to Harrison Township.

Students from across the county are eligible to apply to attend Gloucester County Institute of Technology, a four-year high school in Deptford Township that provides technical and vocational education. As a public school, students do not pay tuition to attend the school.

Friends School Mullica Hill is a private, nonsectarian, coeducational day school located in the Mullica Hill section of Harrison Township that was established in 1969 and now serves students pre-kindergarten through eighth grade.

Guardian Angels Regional School (Pre-K–Grade 3 campus in Gibbstown and 4–8 campus in Paulsboro) takes students from Mullica Hill. It operates under the supervision of the Roman Catholic Diocese of Camden.

== Transportation ==
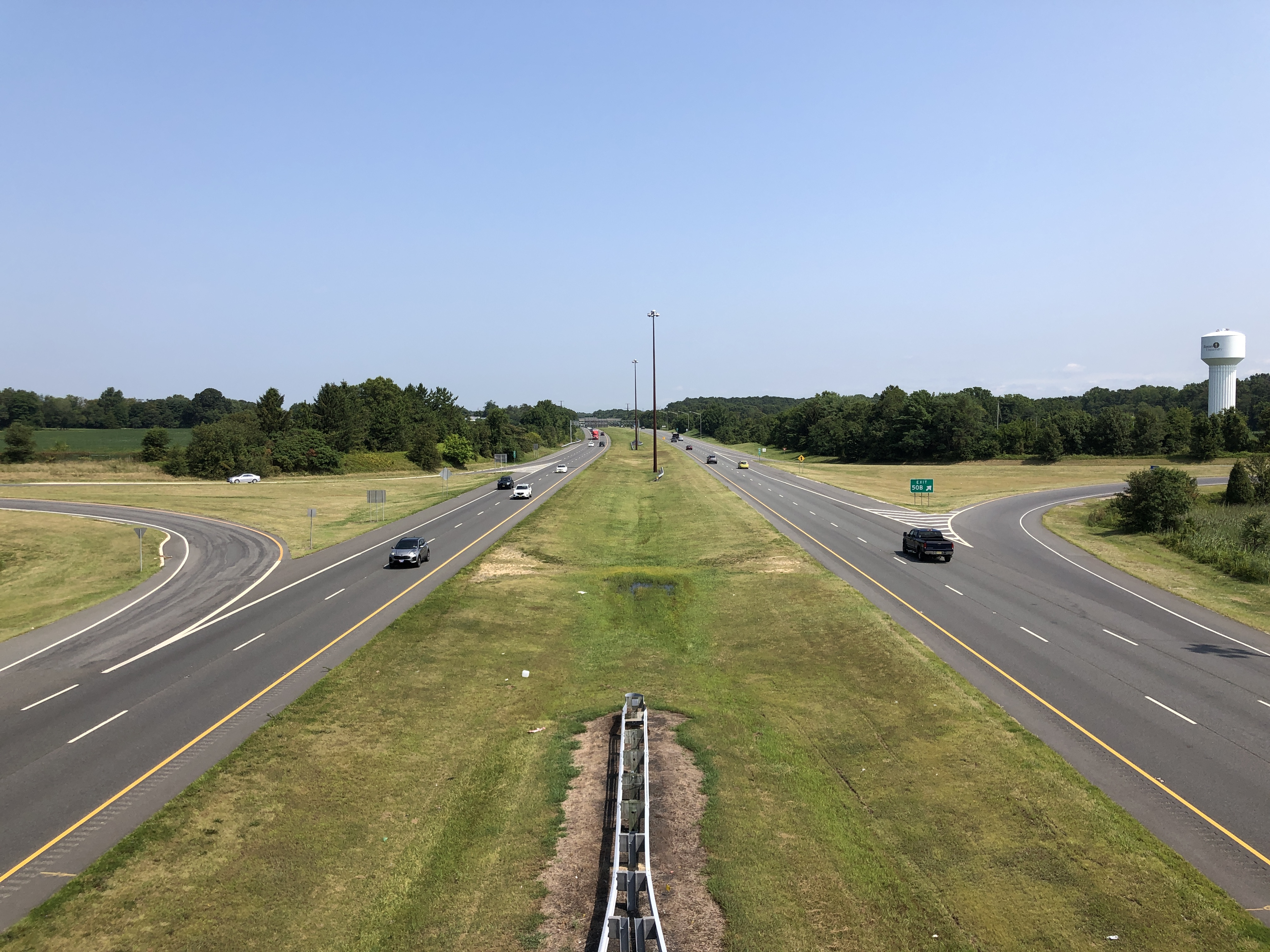
Route 55 northbound U.S. Route 322/County Route 536 in Harrison Township

=== Roads and highways ===
As of May 2010, the township had a total of 93.60 miles (150.63 km) of roadways, of which 56.92 miles (91.60 km) were maintained by the municipality, 29.64 miles (47.70 km) by Gloucester County, 6.94 miles (11.17 km) by the New Jersey Department of Transportation and 0.10 miles (0.16 km) by the New Jersey Turnpike Authority.

Several major roadways pass through Harrison Township. The New Jersey Turnpike runs through the township for a tenth of a mile, but the nearest interchange is just over the border in neighboring Woolwich Township. U.S. Route 322 passes through the center of town, concurrent with County Route 536. State routes include Route 45, Route 55 and Route 77. The other major county road that goes through is County Route 581.

=== Public transportation ===
NJ Transit bus service is available between Bridgeton and Philadelphia on the 410 route.

== Wineries ==
- Heritage Vineyards

== Notable people ==
People who were born in, residents of, or otherwise closely associated with Harrison Township include:

- Jay Accorsi (born 1963), college football coach at Rowan University
- John Brancy (born 1988), operatic baritone
- Jeff Datz (born 1959), professional baseball scout and a former Major League Baseball player and coach
- Wilbur Evans (1905–1987), actor and singer who performed on the radio, in opera, on Broadway, in films, and in early live television
- Bob Folwell (1885–1928), pioneering football player and coach
- Samuel Gibbs French (1818–1910), author and Confederate General during the Civil War
- Big Daddy Graham (1953–2021), comedian, writer, actor, recording artist and sports radio personality on 94 WIP-FM
- John W. Hazelton (1814–1878), represented New Jersey's 1st congressional district from 1871 to 1875
- Gregg Murphy (born 1971), sports journalist who has been a broadcaster for the Philadelphia Phillies
- Nathan T. Stratton (1813–1887), represented New Jersey's 1st congressional district in the United States House of Representatives from 1851 to 1855
- Al Szolack (born 1950), retired basketball player who played for the Washington Generals, the traveling exhibition team best known for their spectacular losing streak in exhibition games against the Harlem Globetrotters
- Lawrie Tatum (1822–1900), Quaker who was best known as an Indian agent to the Kiowa and Comanche tribes at the Fort Sill agency in Indian Territory
- Michelle Tumolo (born 1991), women's lacrosse coach and former player who is the Head Coach of the Army Black Knights women's lacrosse team
