= New Jersey Route 45 =

State highway in southern, New Jersey, US

Route 45

Route information
- Maintained by NJDOT and Gloucester County
- Length: 28.51 mi (45.88 km)
- Existed: 1927–present
- Tourist routes: Bayshore Heritage Byway

Major junctions
- South end: Route 49 in Salem
- US 40 in Woodstown; Route 77 in Harrison Township; US 322 in Harrison Township; I-295 in West Deptford Township
- North end: US 130 in Westville

Location
- Country: United States
- State: New Jersey
- Counties: Salem, Gloucester

Highway system
- New Jersey State Highway Routes; Interstate; US; State; Scenic Byways
← Route 44	→ US 46

Route 45 is a state highway in the southern part of New Jersey. It runs 28.51 mi (45.88 km) from Route 49 in Salem, Salem County, northeast to U.S. Route 130 (US 130) in Westville, Gloucester County. The route is signed as a north-south highway. Much of the southern part of the route runs through rural areas of Salem and Gloucester counties, passing through the communities of Woodstown and Mullica Hill. North of Mullica Hill, Route 45 runs through suburban areas, with the portion of the route between the northern border of Mantua Township and the southern border of Woodbury a four-lane divided highway. The route intersects many highways, including US 40 in Woodstown, Route 77 and US 322 in Mullica Hill, and Interstate 295 (I-295) in West Deptford Township.

The current route was originally a segment of pre-1927 Route 6 that was created in 1917, running from Salem to Camden. Route 45 was designated in 1927 to replace the Salem-Camden branch of pre-1927 Route 6 and was eventually realigned to follow US 130 (Crescent Boulevard) to the Airport Circle in Pennsauken Township. The old alignment became Route 45M. The northern terminus of Route 45 was moved to its current location in 1953 in order to avoid the concurrency with US 130. A freeway for Route 45 between I-295 in Woodbury and US 322 in Mullica Hill was recommended by the Delaware Valley Regional Planning Commission in the 1960s. It was never built, and the New Jersey Department of Transportation proposed widening all of Route 45 into a four-lane divided highway; only a small portion in northern Gloucester County was widened.

== Route description ==
=== Salem County ===
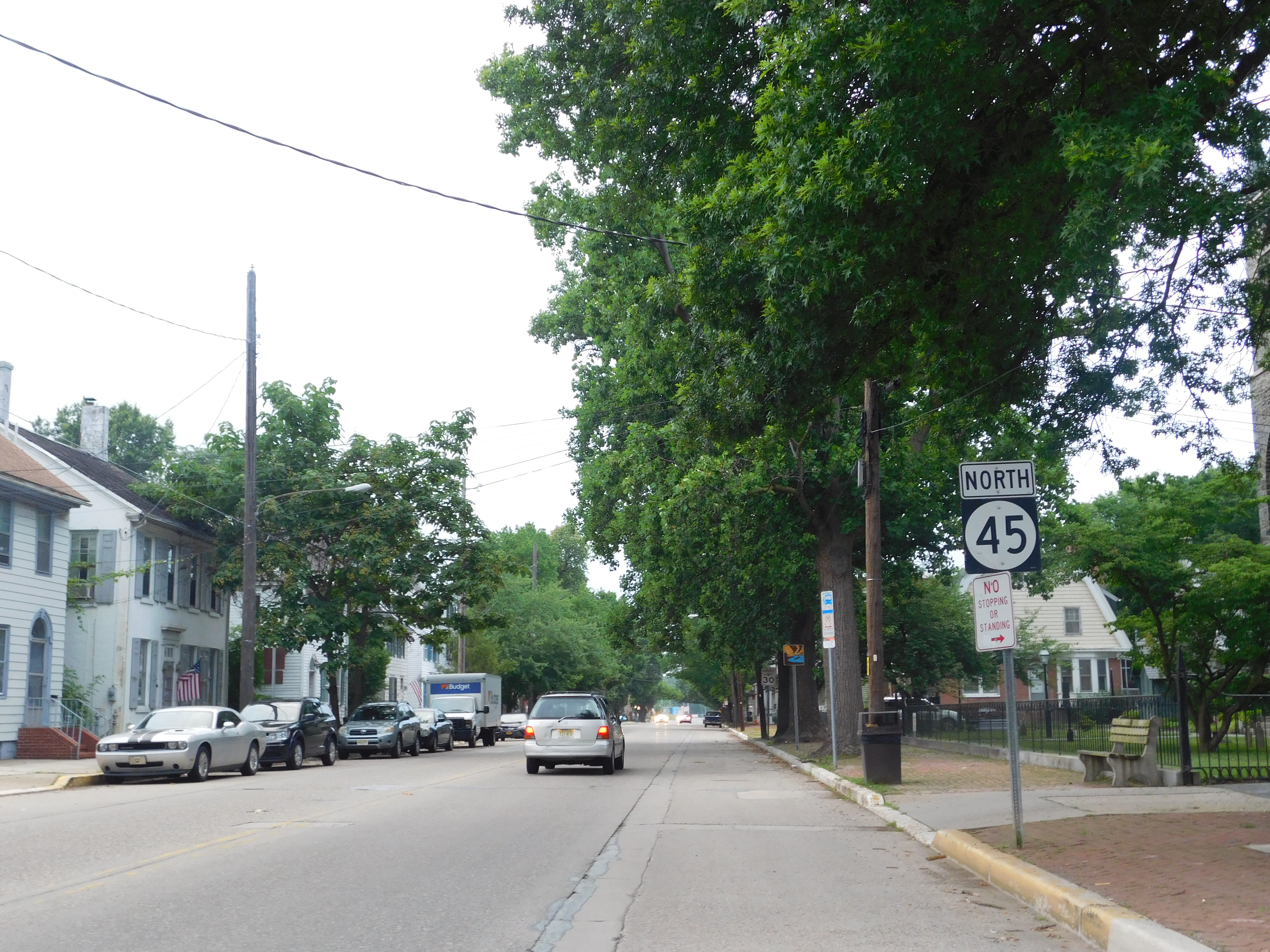
Route 45 northbound in Salem

Route 45 begins at an intersection with Route 49 in Salem, Salem County, heading to the north on Market Street, a two-lane undivided road. It passes downtown businesses and both the Salem County Courthouse and the Old Salem County Courthouse, the second oldest active courthouse in the United States, which currently serves as the Salem City Court. Upon crossing County Route 657 (CR 657), the road heads into residential areas before crossing the SMS Rail Lines' Salem Branch line at-grade and the Fenwick Creek. At the crossing of the latter, Route 45 enters Mannington Township and becomes an unnamed road that passes marshland with some development. The route passes by the Salem Medical Center just prior to an intersection with CR 540 in Pointers.

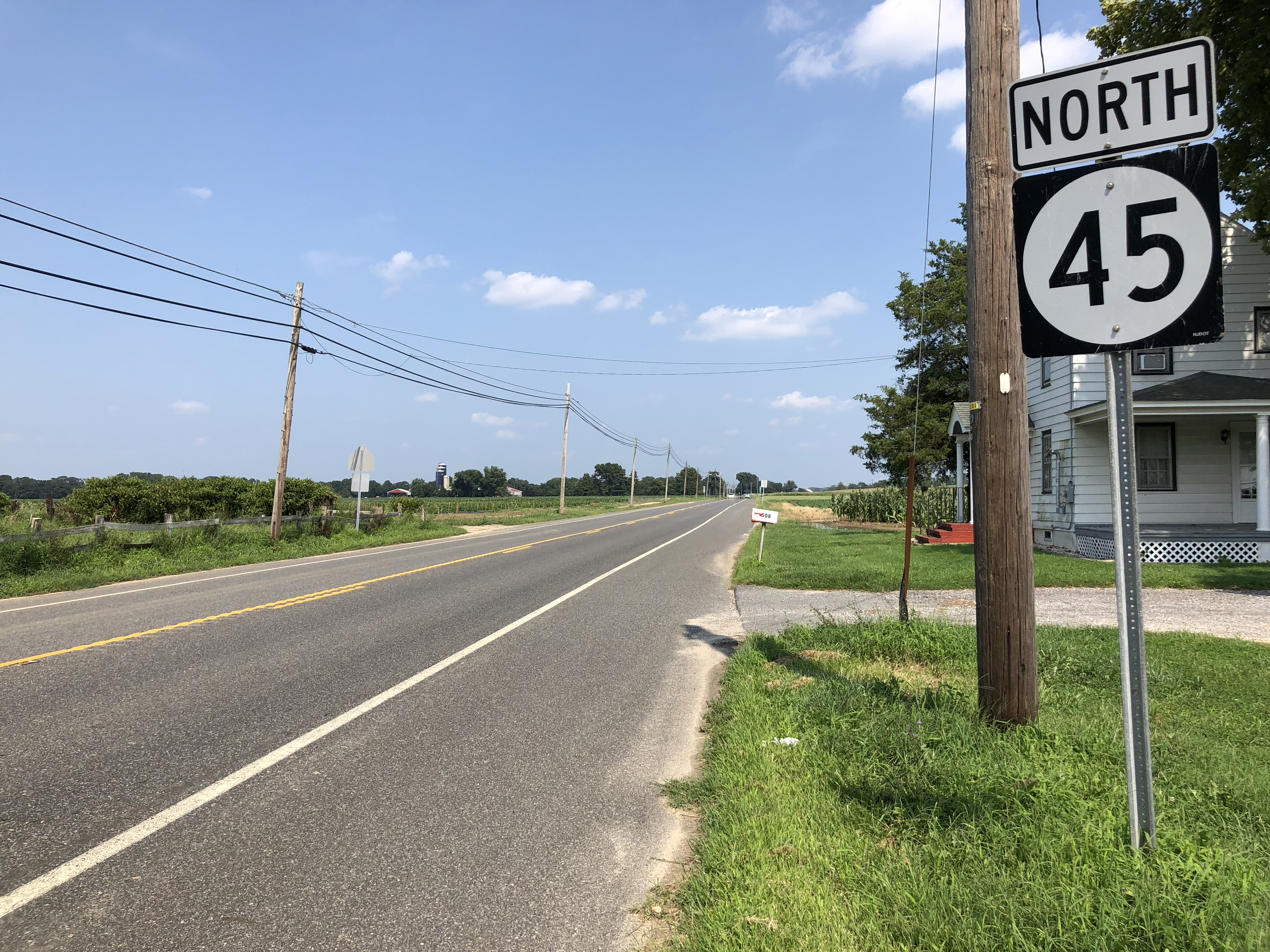
View north along Route 45 at its northeastern junction with CR 540 in Mannington Township

Here, Route 45 turns to the east and forms a concurrency with CR 540, passing through farmland with some woods and homes. CR 540 splits from Route 45 by heading southeast on Welchville Road and Route 45 continues, intersecting CR 653 before crossing the Mannington Creek. It intersects CR 669 and CR 631 within a short distance of each other before passing northwest of Salem County Career and Technical High School and crossing Majors Run into Pilesgrove Township.

Here, the route intersects CR 679 near the Salem County Veterans Cemetery before heading through more agricultural areas. The route reaches an intersection with US 40 (Harding Highway) and CR 616 in a business area, where US 40 forms a concurrency with Route 45. The two routes head northeast into Woodstown as the Harding Highway into residential areas.

At the intersection with Main Street in downtown, Route 45 splits from US 40 by heading north on Main Street while CR 672 heads south on Main Street and US 40 continues to the east on East Avenue. Route 45 continues north, intersecting CR 636 before turning northeast again and meeting CR 602. The road passes over the SMS Rail Lines' Salem Branch line before coming to an intersection with CR 668/CR 617. A short distance later, the route enters Pilesgrove Township again and heads back into farmland with some residences and forested areas as an unnamed road, crossing CR 660.

=== Gloucester County ===
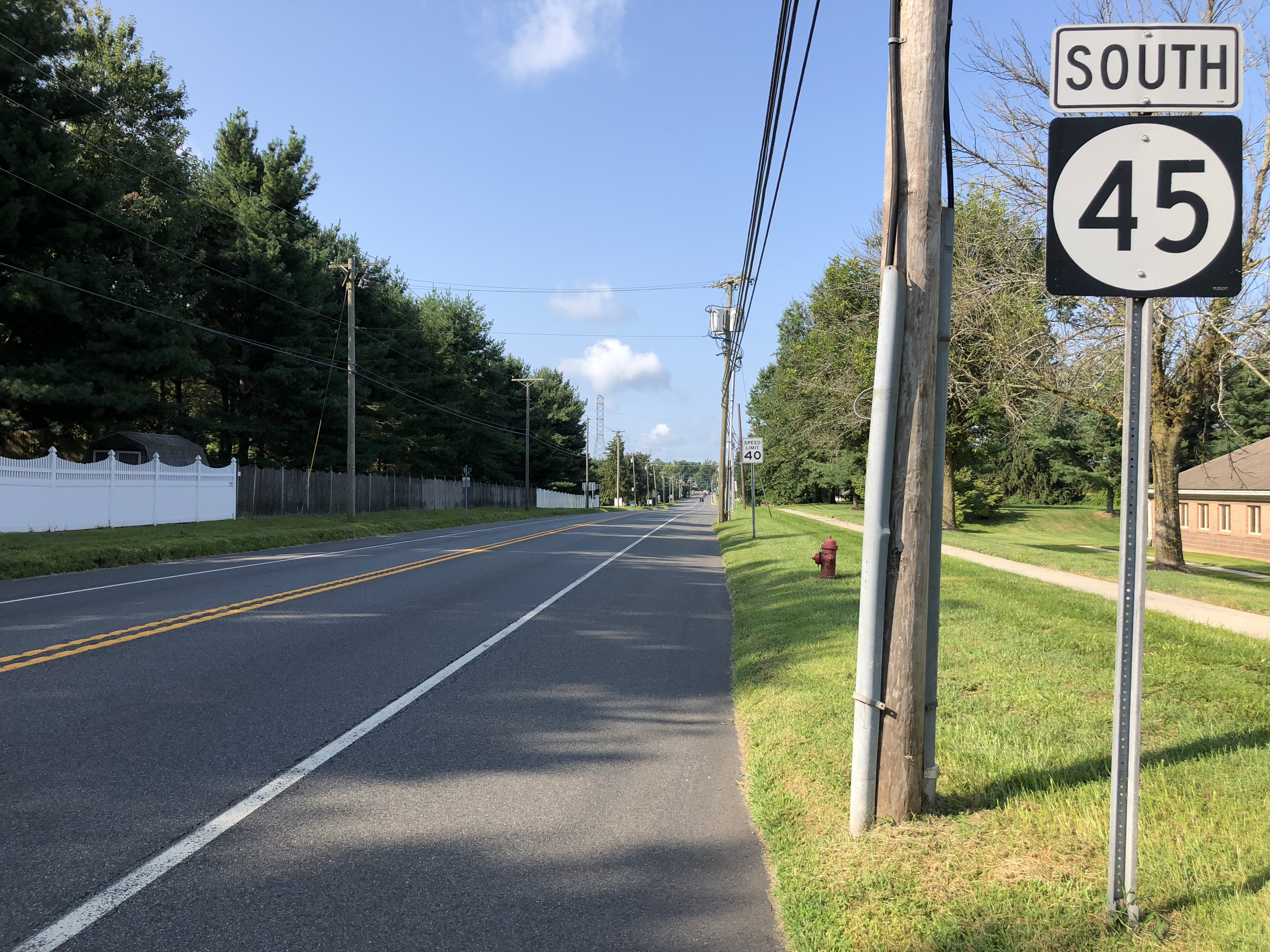
Route 45 southbound past CR 664 in Harrison Township

Route 45 crosses Oldmans Creek into South Harrison Township, Gloucester County within woodland and continues through rural areas with some residential developments such as Woodstown-Mullica Hill Road. The route crosses CR 668 before crossing CR 694 and CR 607 within a close distance of each other. Past this intersection, it continues to CR 617, where the name changes to Woodstown Road, before crossing CR 538. A short distance later, the route enters Harrison Township and continues north. It enters the community of Mullica Hill, where it intersects the northern terminus of Route 77. Here, Route 45 turns north and becomes Main Street, passing homes and some businesses and turning into a county-maintained road. The route intersects Mullica Road, at which point it becomes concurrent with unsigned US 322 Bus./CR 536.

In Mullica Hill, the road crosses US 322 and CR 536A, where US 322 Bus. ends and CR 536 turns west along US 322, and Route 45 continues northeast along Main Street, passing residential and commercial development as a state-maintained road. The route intersects CR 664, CR 603, and CR 667, with a park and ride lot located at the southwest corner of the CR 667 intersection. Following this, Route 45 has an intersection with CR 624 before crossing into Mantua Township, where it becomes Bridgeton Pike. The road heads through a mix of woods and farms with occasional homes, intersecting CR 626. The route passes more rural land before heading into suburban development.

Here, Route 45 intersects CR 627 and CR 678 as it passes a mix of homes and businesses. The route intersects CR 632, where the name changes to Mantua Pike, and CR 553 Alt. before widening into a four-lane divided highway and crossing the Mantua Creek. At this point, Route 45 turns to the north and forms the border between Deptford Township to the east and West Deptford Township to the west, intersecting CR 648 and CR 656. At the intersection with College Boulevard, the route forms the border between Woodbury Heights to the east and West Deptford Township to the west, crossing over the New Jersey Turnpike without an interchange. From here, Route 45 continues north, intersecting CR 652 and CR 650.

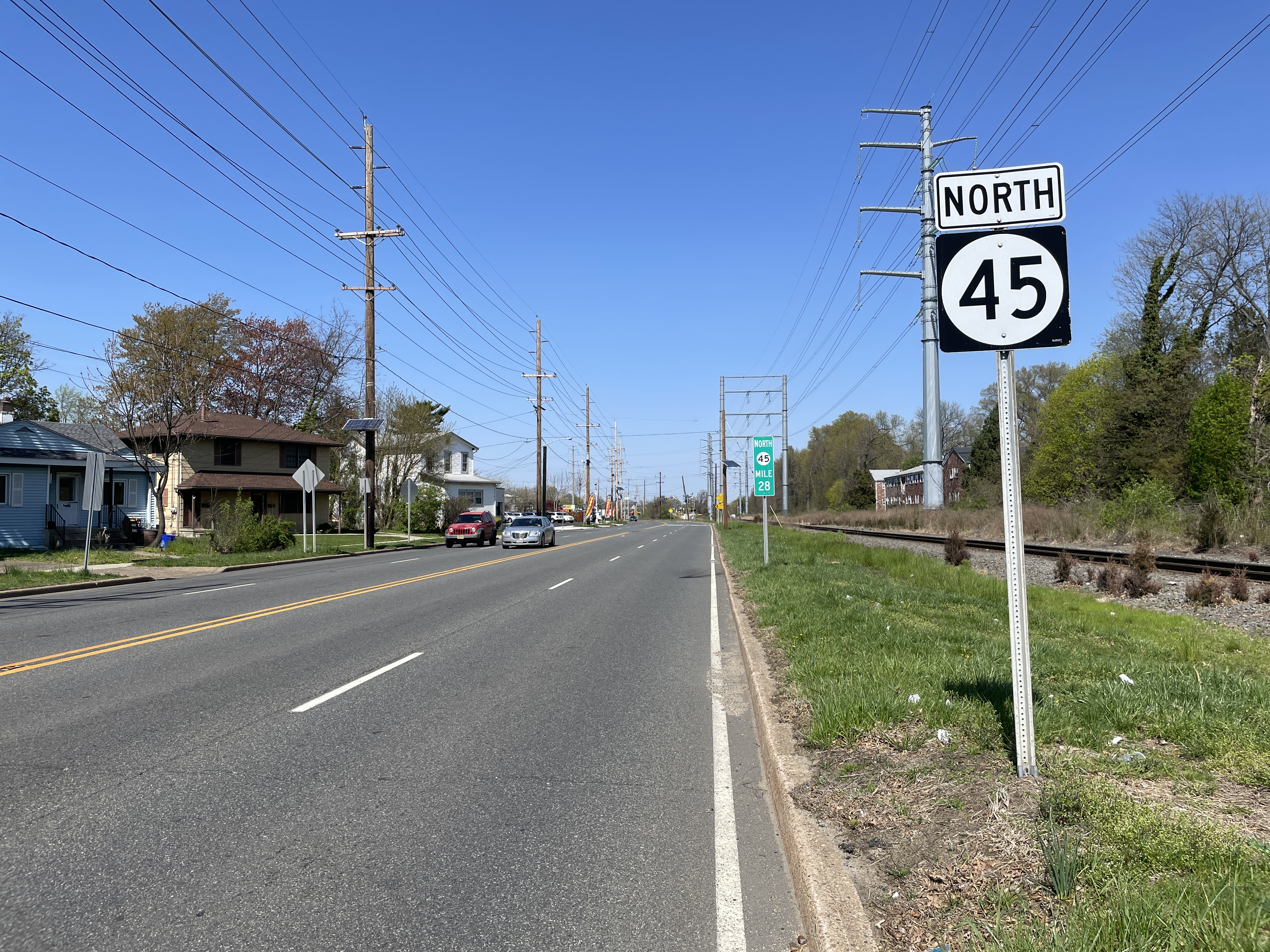
Route 45 northbound in Westville

After the intersection with the latter, the route becomes a four-lane undivided road, entering Woodbury and immediately crossing the Southern Railroad of New Jersey's Salem Branch line at-grade. The road crosses Conrail Shared Assets Operations' (CSAO) Penns Grove Secondary railroad line at-grade before coming to an intersection with CR 551. Here, Route 45 forms a concurrency with CR 551 and heads north-northeast on Broad Street through the downtown of Woodbury, where it intersects CR 663. Route 45 and CR 551 cross the Woodbury Creek out of the downtown area and intersect CR 644 near Inspira Health Center Woodbury. From here, the route continues past a mix of residences and businesses as a two-lane undivided road. CR 551 splits from Route 45 by heading east on Park Avenue then north on Broadway.

Meanwhile, Route 45 continues north along the border between Deptford Township to the east and Woodbury to the west, with CSAO's Vineland Secondary railroad line closely paralleling the route on its east side. At the intersection with CR 642, the road forms the border between Deptford Township and West Deptford Township again. The route widens into a four-lane divided highway as it comes to a partial interchange with I-295, with some of the movements provided by nearby CR 551 to the east. Past this interchange, Route 45 becomes a four-lane undivided highway and enters Westville. Here, it continues parallel to the railroad line to the east with businesses lining the west side of the road. Route 45 passes residential areas before it comes to its northern terminus at a partial interchange with US 130, with access to northbound US 130 and access from southbound US 130.

== History ==
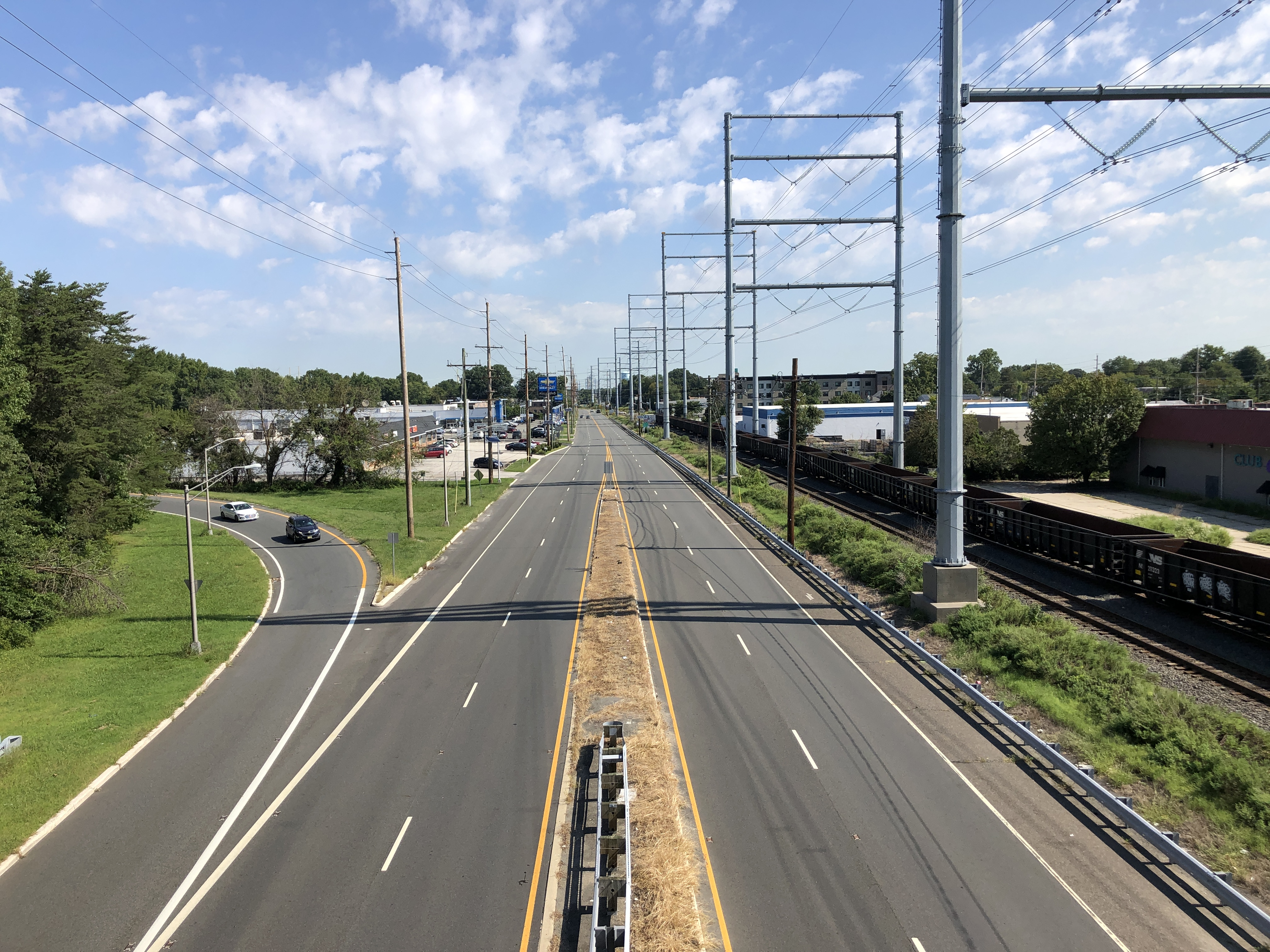
View northbound along Route 45 from I-295 on the border of Deptford Township and West Deptford Township

Between Mullica Hill and Woodbury, the road was maintained under the Mullica Hill and Woodbury Turnpike Company, which was chartered in 1849. The same day, the Woodbury and Camden Turnpike was chartered. Three days later, a bill was passed permitting the two companies to merge as the Mullica Hill and Camden Turnpike Company, though the merger seems to have fallen through, as charter amendments would be administered to the former two companies' charters. The Woodbury and Camden was rechartered as the Camden and Gloucester Turnpike Company in 1853. From Mullica Hill to Woodstown, the Mullica Hill and Woodstown Turnpike Company maintained a road, though it's now bypassed by Route 45. South of Woodstown, the road was maintained by the Salem and Woodstown Turnpike.

What is now Route 45 was originally designated as a segment of pre-1927 Route 6 in 1917. This route was to head south from Camden and follow Route 45 to Mullica Hill, where it split into two branches, with one going to Salem on current Route 45 and another going to Bridgeton on current Route 77. In the 1927 New Jersey state highway renumbering, pre-1927 Route 6 between Camden and Salem became Route 45. A bypass around Camden was created as the southern half of Crescent Boulevard, a part of US 130, and Route 45 was rerouted to use the bypass up to the Airport Circle in Pennsauken Township. The old alignment of Route 45 became Route 45M. In the 1953 New Jersey state highway renumbering, the northern terminus of Route 45 was cut back to its current location in Westville to avoid the concurrency with US 130.

In the late 1960s, the Delaware Valley Regional Planning Commission (DVRPC) proposed construction of a 10-mile (16 km) long, $20 million freeway along the Route 45 corridor in Gloucester County which would have extended from Exit 24 of I-295 in Woodbury to a planned US 322 freeway in Mullica Hill. The New Jersey Department of Transportation never followed through on this proposal. A portion of Route 45 was widened to four lanes from the border of Woodbury to the border of Mantua Township by the 1980s. In 2012, the Mullica Hill Bypass was completed, and US 322 was removed from its concurrency with Route 45.

== Major intersections ==
County	Location	mi	km	Destinations	Notes
Salem	Salem	0.00	0.00	Route 49 (Broadway) – Bridgeton, Millville, Pennsville	Southern terminus
Salem	Mannington Township	2.12	3.41	CR 540 west (Bypass Road) to N.J. Turnpike – Delaware Memorial Bridge	South end of CR 540 overlap
Salem	Mannington Township	3.29	5.29	CR 540 east (Welchville Road) – Alloway	North end of CR 540 overlap
Salem	Pilesgrove Township	8.80	14.16	US 40 west (Harding Highway) to N.J. Turnpike – Delaware Memorial Bridge	South end of US 40 overlap
Salem	Woodstown	9.44	15.19	US 40 east (East Avenue)	North end of US 40 overlap
Gloucester	South Harrison Township	15.65	25.19	CR 538 (Swedesboro-Franklinville Road) – Swedesboro, Hardingville	
Gloucester	Harrison Township	17.40	28.00	Route 77 south (Bridgeton Pike) – Bridgeton	Northern terminus of Route 77
Gloucester	Harrison Township	17.78	28.61	US 322 Bus. east / CR 536 east (Mullica Road) to US 322 – Glassboro, Pitman	South end of US 322 Bus./CR 536 overlap
Gloucester	Harrison Township	18.16	29.23	US 322 (CR 536 west / CR 536A east / Swedesboro Road / Mullica Hill Bypass) to N.J. Turnpike / Route 55 – Commodore Barry Bridge, Pennsylvania, Bridgeport, Shore Points, Glassboro US 322 Bus. ends	North end of US 322 Bus./CR 536 overlap
Gloucester	Mantua Township	22.69	36.52	CR 553 Alt. south (Main Street) – Mantua, Pitman	
Gloucester	Woodbury	25.49	41.02	CR 551 south (Salem Avenue)	South end of CR 551 overlap
Gloucester	Woodbury	26.93	43.34	CR 551 north (Park Avenue)	North end of CR 551 overlap
Gloucester	West Deptford Township	27.65	44.50	I-295 north to I-76 – Camden, Philadelphia	I-295 exit 24A; access to northbound I-295 and access from southbound I-295
Gloucester	Westville	28.51	45.88	US 130 north	Northern terminus; access to northbound US 130 and access from southbound US 130
1.000 mi = 1.609 km; 1.000 km = 0.621 mi: Concurrency terminus; Incomplete access

== Future ==
The New Jersey Department of Transportation is planning on rebuilding Route 45 in Woodbury to make it more friendly to pedestrians and bicyclists. The project calls for reducing the road from four lanes to three lanes while adding bike lanes, curb extensions to improve safety for pedestrians, and improvements to curb ramps and crosswalks. It is currently in the design stage.
