= County Route 553 (New Jersey) =

County Route 553
- CR 553 highlighted in red, with CR 553 Alt running west of the main line

Route information
- Length: 51.22 mi (82.43 km)
- Tourist routes: Bayshore Heritage Byway

Major junctions
- South end: Hands Landing Road/Ogden Avenue in Commercial Township
- Route 49 in Fairfield Township; Route 56 in Upper Deerfield Township; US 40 in Upper Pittsgrove Township; Route 55 in Elk Township; US 322 in Glassboro; Route 47 in Glassboro; Route 55 in Mantua Township
- North end: CR 551 in Deptford

Location
- Country: United States
- State: New Jersey
- Counties: Cumberland, Salem, Gloucester

Highway system
- County routes in New Jersey; 500-series routes
← CR 552	→ CR 554

County Route 553 (CR 553) is a county highway in the U.S. state of New Jersey. The highway extends 51.22 miles (82.43 km) from Hands Landing Road/Ogden Avenue in Commercial Township to Broadway (CR 551) in Deptford Township.

== Route description ==
=== Cumberland County ===
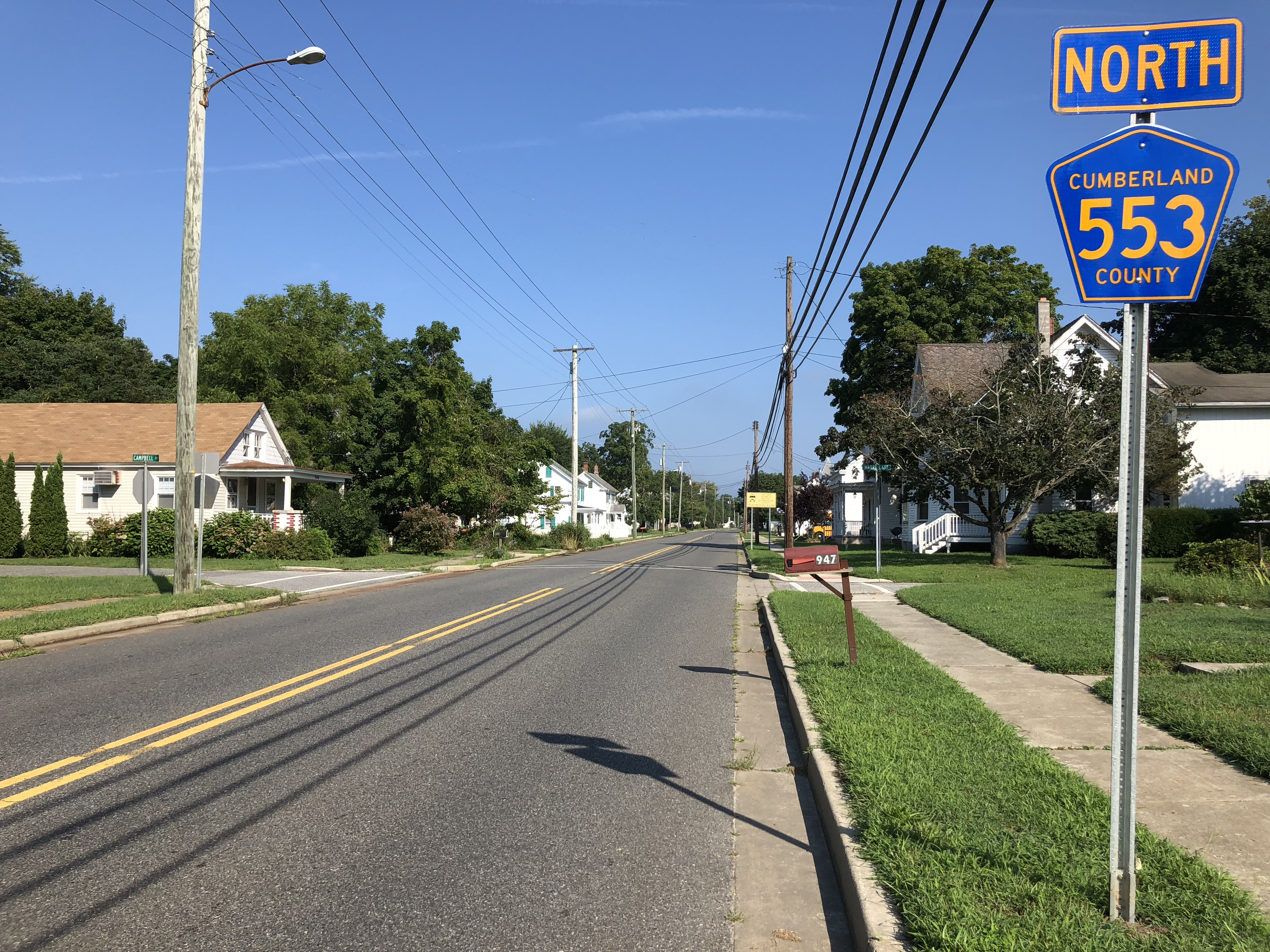
View north along CR 553 at Campbell Street in Downe Township

CR 553 begins at an intersection with Hands Landing Road and Ogden Avenue in the residential community of Port Norris in Commercial Township, Cumberland County, heading west on two-lane undivided Main Street and intersecting CR 649. The route leaves Port Norris and heads northwest as Port Norris Road, heading into a mix of farms and woods as it reaches a junction with CR 725. CR 553 enters Downe Township and becomes Main Street as it passes through more rural areas and intersects CR 614. The road crosses the Dividing Creek into the community of the same name, where it passes homes and reaches junctions with CR 676, CR 664, and CR 555. After leaving Dividing Creek, the route passes through forested areas with a few lakes, intersecting CR 700 and CR 702 before CR 664 returns to the road. The name of the road becomes Bridgeton-Port Norris Road and it heads west across the marshy Beaver Dam before heading into rural areas of homes, turning north at the CR 732 junction. CR 553 crosses CR 656 before heading northwest into Lawrence Township at the crossing of Pages Run, where the name becomes Main Street and it intersects CR 629. The route passes through woodland with some farms and homes prior to coming into the residential and commercial community of Cedarville. In this area, CR 553 crosses CR 610 and turns north as it passes Cedar Lake, running near homes before turning northwest out of Cedarville. The road heads into agricultural areas and intersects CR 662 before entering Fairfield Township. The route turns north onto Cedarville Road at the CR 648 junction and enters wooded areas of homes as it heads into Fairton and intersects CR 657 and CR 601. CR 553 turns northeast at the latter and passes residences and businesses prior to turning northwest at the CR 692/CR 698 junction. The road passes Clarks Pond and curves north as it comes to the CR 609 intersection.

At this point, the route turns northeast onto Fairton-Gouldtown Road and heads through wooded areas of homes, crossing a Winchester and Western Railroad line. After crossing CR 722 and CR 638, the road heads through a few farm fields before heading back into forested residential areas as it meets CR 706. Upon coming to the CR 670 junction, CR 553 turns north onto Gouldtown-Woodruff Road, with CR 675 heading to the northeast. The road passes a few fields as it crosses Route 49, at which point it passes through a mix of farms, woods, and homes. CR 553 intersects CR 720 before heading into Upper Deerfield Township and becoming South Woodruff Road as it crosses CR 552. The route intersects CR 654 before making a turn to the northwest at the junctions with CR 659 and CR 705. CR 553 crosses the Winchester and Western Railroad before entering agricultural areas and reaching an intersection with Route 56 and CR 687. Here, the route heads northwest along East Finley Road and passes a mix of farms and homes prior to coming to a junction with CR 611. At this point, CR 553 turns north-northeast onto Centerton Road, with CR 617 continuing along Finley Road. The road passes through more farmland as it crosses CR 605, CR 658, and CR 687. The route passes through a mix of farms and woods as it reaches the CR 715 junction.

=== Salem and Gloucester counties ===
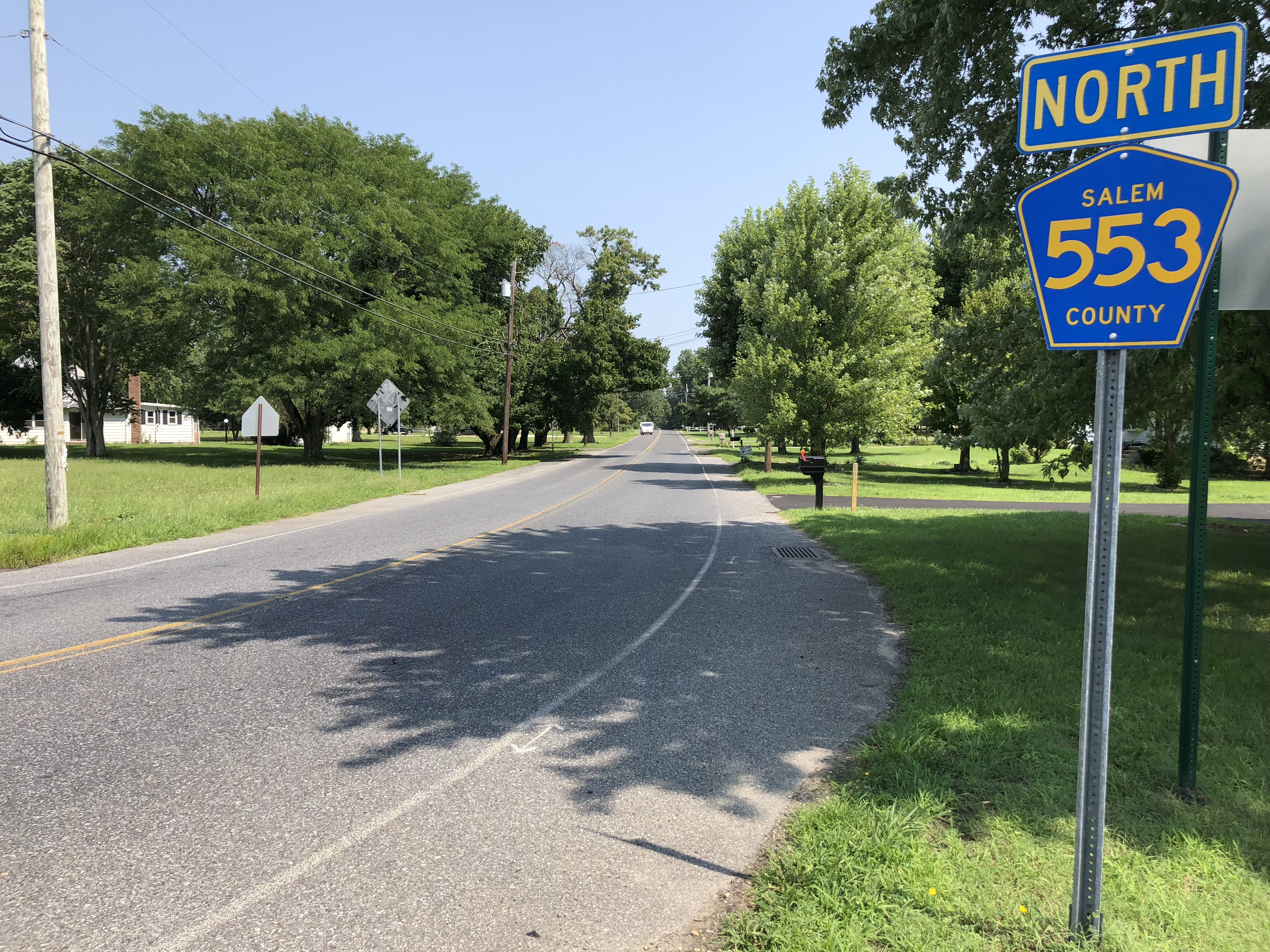
CR 553 northbound past CR 610 in Pittsgrove Township

CR 553 enters Pittsgrove Township in Salem County and passes through forested areas with some homes before reaching CR 540. CR 553 forms a concurrency with CR 540 as the road passes northeast near Centerton Pond in wooded areas. A short distance later, CR 553 splits from 540 by continuing north-northeast on Centerton Road, intersecting CR 612 before passing west of Arthur P. Schalick High School and heading through farmland with a few residences. After the CR 613 junction, the route enters forested areas of residences, crossing CR 674 before passing a few farms and intersecting CR 690 and CR 610, where the name becomes Buck Road. Continuing through more woodland with occasional farm fields and homes, CR 553 crosses CR 621 and CR 639. After running through a dense area of forest, the route heads into Upper Pittsgrove Township at an intersection with US 40. The road runs through more woods before heading into a mix of farms, woods, and homes.

CR 553 heads into Franklin Township in Gloucester County and crosses CR 604 in agricultural areas. A short distance later, the route continues into Elk Township and enters more wooded areas as it reaches intersections with CR 538 and CR 667. CR 553 comes to an interchange with the Route 55 freeway and meets CR 608 as it passes through rural areas of homes before passing through woods. The road crosses CR 610 as the road passes between woodland to the west and farmland to the east. The route heads through more rural areas with homes before crossing into Glassboro. At this point, CR 553 becomes Main Street as it intersects CR 628 and crosses Conrail Shared Assets Operations' Vineland Secondary before passing homes. Upon crossing CR 641, the road heads into a mix of homes and businesses as it comes to the US 322/CR 536 junction. The route intersects CR 682 as it continues north into residential areas, making a turn to the northwest and passing businesses, CR 553 splits from Main Street by turning east onto municipally-maintained Donald Barger Boulevard, with CR 553 Alternate continuing along Main Street. CR 553 comes to an intersection with Route 47 and turns north to form a concurrency with that route along Delsea Drive, a five-lane road with a center left-turn lane that passes shopping centers.

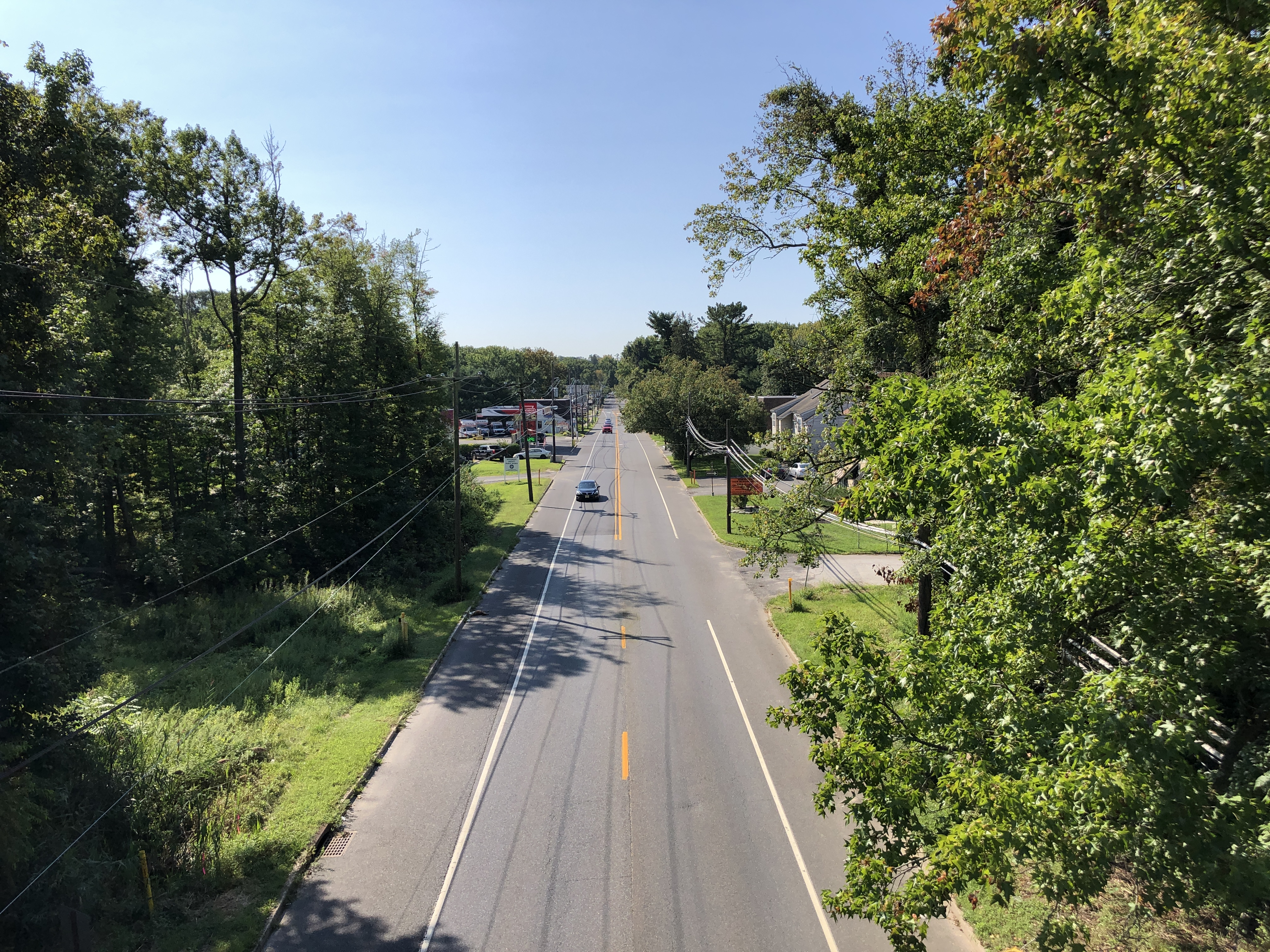
View southbound along CR 553 from the New Jersey Turnpike in Woodbury Heights

CR 553 splits from Route 47 by turning north-northwest onto two-lane South Woodbury Road. The road passes through wooded residential areas as it comes into Pitman, reaching intersections with CR 639 and CR 624. The route becomes North Woodbury Road at the latter and widens to four lanes at the point it becomes the border between Pitman to the west and Mantua Township to the east. Upon crossing CR 635, CR 553 fully enters Mantua Township and passes through wooded areas of commercial development, widening into a divided highway as it comes to another interchange with the Route 55 freeway. Following this interchange, the road becomes undivided again as it passes more wooded areas of businesses and homes. The route intersects CR 676, where the name becomes Woodbury-Glassboro Road, and CR 603. Upon crossing the Mantua Creek, the road heads into Deptford Township and passes rural areas of homes. At the Salina Road intersection, CR 553 becomes the border between Wenonah to the west and Deptford Township to the east running near farmland and wooded residential developments. The route briefly gains a center left-turn lane and runs through wooded neighborhoods as it intersects CR 632 and becomes Glassboro Road before coming to CR 665 as a two lane road again. The road fully enters Deptford Township again at the Linden Street intersection before crossing into Woodbury Heights. In this area, CR 553 passes more wooded areas of homes, intersecting CR 652 before heading into commercial areas and passing under the New Jersey Turnpike. Upon heading into Woodbury, the route intersects CR 650 at a traffic circle and turns northeast onto Evergreen Avenue. The road passes a mix of homes and businesses, crossing CR 663 before heading north into residential areas. After crossing the Woodbury Creek, the route intersects CR 644 in commercial areas and turns north-northeast past more residences. CR 553 crosses back into Deptford Township and ends at CR 551 a short distance later.

== History ==
The alignment of County Route 553 in Cumberland County was formerly designated as CR 9 (Port Norris–Route 49 in Bridgeton), CR 4 (Bridgeton–Deerfield Township) and CR 11 (Deerfield Township (CR 38)–Salem County line).

== Major intersections ==
County	Location	mi	km	Destinations	Notes
Cumberland	Commercial Township	0.00	0.00	Ogden Avenue	Southern terminus; former northern terminus of CR 632
Cumberland	Downe Township	4.68	7.53	CR 555 north (Church Street)	Southern terminus of CR 555
Cumberland	Fairfield Township	19.35	31.14	Route 49 (East Commerce Street / Bridgeton-Millville Pike)	
Cumberland	Upper Deerfield Township	20.58	33.12	CR 552 (Irving Avenue)	
Cumberland	Upper Deerfield Township	22.97	36.97	Route 56 (Landis Avenue) – Bridgeton, Vineland	
Salem	Pittsgrove Township	27.44	44.16	CR 540 west (Deerfield Road)	South end of CR 540 overlap
Salem	Pittsgrove Township	27.56	44.35	CR 540 east – Parvin State Park, Vineland, Atlantic City	North end of CR 540 overlap
Salem	Pittsgrove Township	32.76	52.72	US 40 – Elmer, Woodstown, Malaga	
Gloucester	Elk Township	36.16	58.19	CR 538 – Swedesboro, Franklinville	
Gloucester	Elk Township	36.64	58.97	Route 55 – Bellmawr, Vineland	Exit 45 (Route 55)
Gloucester	Glassboro	40.51	65.19	US 322 (CR 536)	
Gloucester	Glassboro	41.41	66.64	CR 553 Alt. north (Main Street)	Southern terminus of CR 553 Alt.
Gloucester	Glassboro	41.59	66.93	Route 47 south (Delsea Drive)	South end of Route 47 overlap
Gloucester	Glassboro	41.89	67.42	Route 47 north (Delsea Drive)	North end of Route 47 overlap
Gloucester	Mantua Township	44.25	71.21	Route 55 – Glassboro, Bellmawr	Exit 53 (Route 55)
Gloucester	Deptford Township	51.22	82.43	CR 551	Northern terminus
1.000 mi = 1.609 km; 1.000 km = 0.621 mi: Concurrency terminus

== CR 553 Alternate ==
County Route 553 Alternate
- Location: Glassboro–Mantua Township
- Length: 6.19 mi (9.96 km)

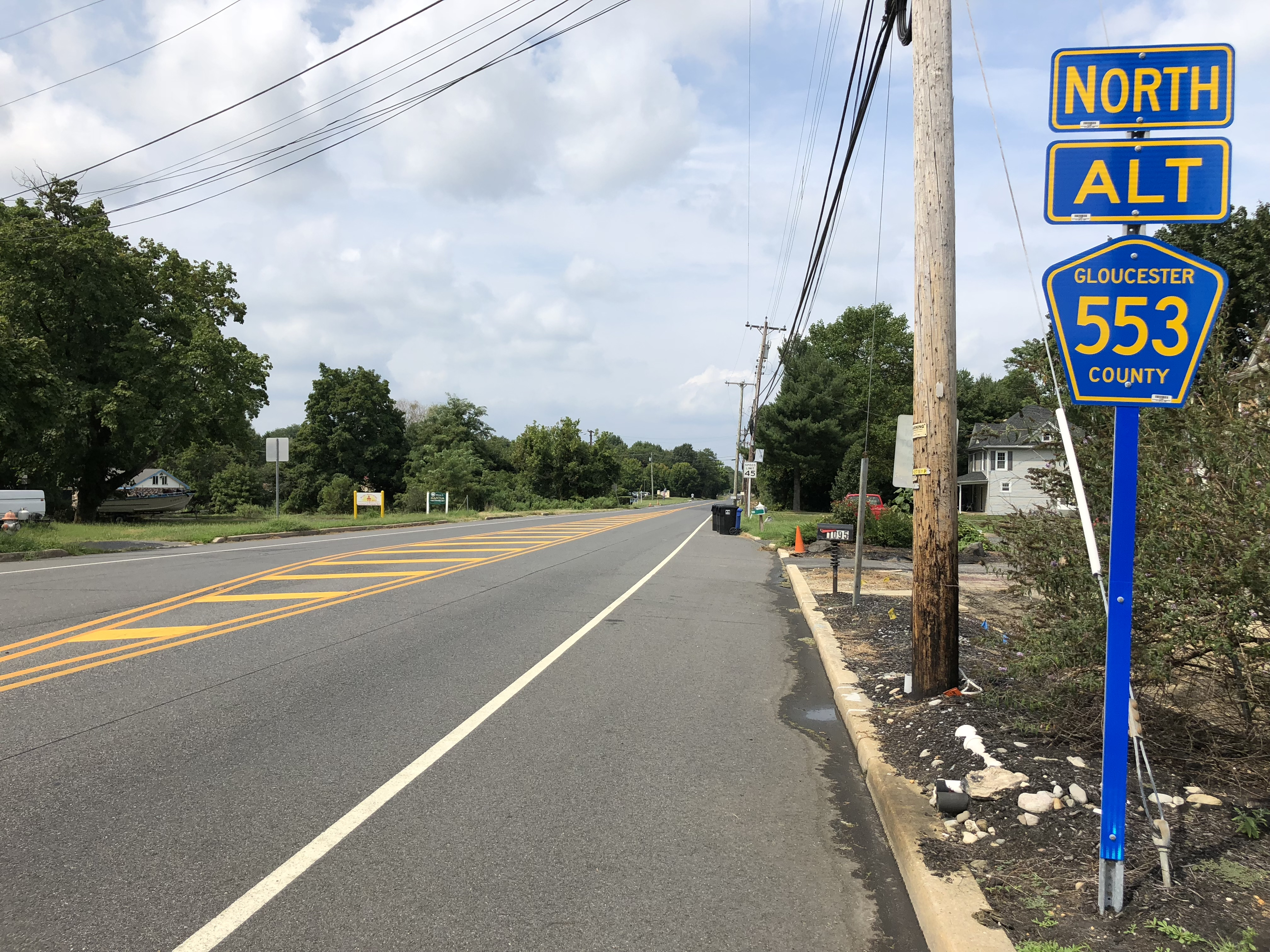
View north along CR 553 Alt at CR 635 in Mantua Township

County Route 553 Alternate, abbreviated CR 553 Alt, is a county highway in the U.S. state of New Jersey. The highway extends 6.19 miles (9.96 km) from Donald Barger Boulevard (CR 553) in Glassboro to Bridgeton Pike (Route 45) in Mantua Township, passing through Pitman.

Historically, the road was maintained by the Glassboro and Carpenter's Landing Turnpike Company, chartered in 1850. The company was in business as late as 1904.
