= List of county routes in Camden County, New Jersey =

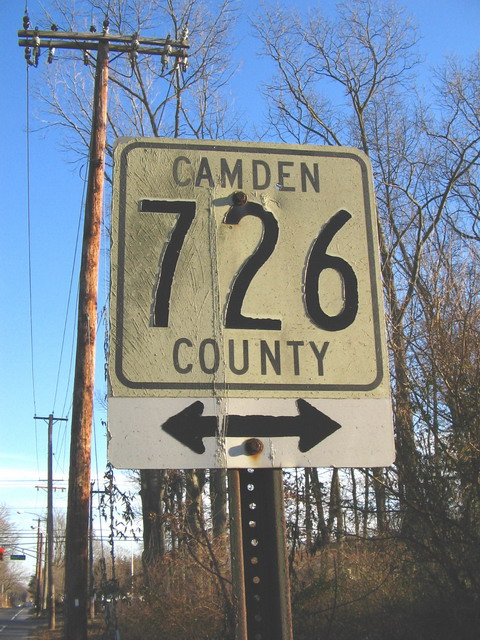
Older square shield for CR 726

The following is a list of county routes in Camden County in the U.S. state of New Jersey. For more information on the county route system in New Jersey as a whole, including its history, see County routes in New Jersey.

== 500-series county routes ==
In addition to those listed below, the following 500-series county routes serve Camden County:

- CR 534, CR 536, CR 536 Spur, CR 537, CR 543, CR 544, CR 551, CR 551 Spur, CR 561, CR 573

== Other county routes ==
Route	Length (mi)	Length (km)	From	Via	To	Notes
CR 600	0.19	0.31	Route 70 in Cherry Hill	Old Marlton Pike	Old Marlton Pike (CR 600) at the Burlington County line in Cherry Hill	
CR 601	3.13	5.04	North 2nd Street in Camden	State Street, Marlton Pike	Browning Road (CR 612) in Pennsauken Township	
CR 603	2.41	3.88	Mechanic Street and South 2nd Street in Camden	Ferry Avenue, Dwight Avenue	Haddon Avenue (CR 561) on the Camden/Collingswood border	
CR 604	0.75	1.21	South 4th Street in Camden	Newton Avenue	Haddon Avenue (CR 561) in Camden	
CR 605	1.43	2.30	Mount Ephraim Avenue (Route 168) and Ferry Avenue (CR 603) on the Camden/Woodlynne border	Mount Ephraim Avenue	South 10th Street in Camden	
CR 606	0.29	0.47	Haddon Avenue (CR 561) in Camden	White Horse Pike	White Horse Pike (US 30) and Crescent Boulevard (US 30/US 130) in Collingswood	
CR 606 Alt.	0.19	0.31	White Horse Pike (CR 606) in Camden	Old White Horse Pike	Haddon Avenue (CR 561) in Camden	
CR 607	2.46	3.96	South Front Street in Camden	Kaighns Avenue	Admiral Wilson Boulevard (US 30), Crescent Boulevard (US 30/US 130), and Kaighns Avenue (Route 38) in Pennsauken Township	
CR 608	1.23	1.98	Kaighns Avenue (CR 607) in Camden	Baird Boulevard	Federal Street (CR 537) in Camden	
CR 609	1.26	2.03	Marlton Pike (CR 601) in Camden	27th Street	River Avenue (CR 543) in Camden	
CR 610	2.94	4.73	Federal Street (CR 537) in Camden	Westfield Avenue, Burlington Pike	Crescent Boulevard (US 130) in Pennsauken Township	
CR 611	1.36	2.19	Federal Street (CR 537) on the Camden/Pennsauken Township border	36th Street	Harrison Avenue in Camden	
CR 612 (1)	0.87	1.40	Collings Avenue (CR 630) in Collingswood	Browning Road	South Park Drive (CR 629) in Collingswood	
CR 612 (2)	0.52	0.84	North Park Drive (CR 628) in Pennsauken Township	Browning Road	Route 70 in Pennsauken Township	
CR 612 (3)	2.41	3.88	Marlton Pike (CR 601) in Pennsauken Township	Browning Road	River Road (CR 543) in Pennsauken Township	
CR 612 Spur	0.13	0.21	Browning Road (CR 612) in Pennsauken Township	49th Street	River Road (CR 543) in Pennsauken Township	
CR 613	1.39	2.24	Marlton Pike (Route 70) on the Pennsauken Township/Cherry Hill township line	Lexington Avenue	West Maple Avenue (CR 537) in Merchantville	
CR 614	1.33	2.14	Westfield Avenue (CR 610) in Pennsauken Township	Derousse Avenue	End of the county maintenance in Pennsauken Township	
CR 615	2.52	4.06	Maple Avenue (CR 537) in Pennsauken Township	Union Avenue	River Road (CR 543) in Pennsauken Township	
CR 616	5.23	8.42	River Road (CR 543) in Pennsauken Township	Cove Road, Church Road	Church Road (CR 616) at the Burlington County line in Cherry Hill	
CR 617	0.22	0.35	Westfield Avenue (CR 610) in Pennsauken Township	43rd Street	Madison Avenue in Pennsauken Township	
CR 619	0.52	0.84	Browning Road (CR 612) in Merchantville	Chestnut Avenue	Centre Street (CR 622) in Merchantville	
CR 620	0.54	0.87	Merchantville Avenue in Pennsauken Township	Rogers Avenue	Cove Road (CR 616) on the Merchantville/Pennsauken Township border	
CR 621	2.04	3.28	West Maple Avenue (CR 537) in Merchantville	Park Avenue	Park Avenue at the Burlington County line in Pennsauken Township	
CR 622	0.85	1.37	Chapel Avenue (CR 626) in Merchantville	Centre Street	Cove Road (CR 616) in Pennsauken Township	
CR 623	1.33	2.14	Marlton Pike (Route 70) in Cherry Hill	Hampton Road, Cuthbert Boulevard, Hampton Road	Chapel Avenue (CR 626) in Cherry Hill	
CR 624	0.60	0.97	Chapel Avenue (CR 626) in Cherry Hill	Hinchman Avenue, Plymouth Place	Church Road (CR 616) in Merchantville	
CR 625	0.36	0.58	Route 38 in Cherry Hill	Kenilworth Avenue	Chapel Avenue (CR 626) in Cherry Hill	
CR 626	3.43	5.52	West Maple Avenue (CR 537) in Merchantville	Chapel Avenue	Kings Highway (Route 41) in Cherry Hill	
CR 627	2.12	3.41	Marlton Pike (Route 70) in Cherry Hill	Cooper Landing Road, Church Road, Coles Avenue	South Coles Avenue at the Burlington County line in Cherry Hill	
CR 628 (1)	2.88	4.63	Kaighns Avenue (CR 607) in Pennsauken Township	North Park Drive	Dead end in Cherry Hill	
CR 628 (2)	2.06	3.32	Dead end in Cherry Hill	Park Boulevard	Caldwell Road in Cherry Hill	
CR 629	2.38	3.83	Crescent Boulevard (US 30/US 130) in Camden	South Park Boulevard	Vesper Avenue in Haddon Township	
CR 630	2.95	4.75	Essex Street (CR 755) in Gloucester City	Collings Road, Collings Avenue	Haddon Avenue (CR 561) in Collingswood	
CR 631	0.78	1.26	Jersey Avenue (CR 632) and Water Street (CR 633) in Gloucester City	South King Street, North King Street	Broadway (CR 551) in Gloucester City	
CR 632	0.76	1.22	Broadway (CR 551) in Gloucester City	Jersey Avenue	South King Street (CR 631) and Water Street (CR 633) in Gloucester City	
CR 633	0.21	0.34	5th Street in Gloucester City	Water Street	South King Street (CR 631) and Jersey Avenue (CR 632) in Gloucester City	
CR 634	2.14	3.44	Dead end in Gloucester City	Market Street	Kings Highway (CR 551 Spur) in Mount Ephraim	
CR 635	2.78	4.47	CR 551 in Gloucester City	Hudson Street, Nicholson Road	White Horse Pike (US 30) in Audubon	
CR 636	3.43	5.52	White Horse Pike (US 30) on the Haddon Township/Audubon/Oaklyn tripoint border	Cuthbert Boulevard, Lexington Avenue Extension, Hampton Road, Lexington Avenue Extension	Wisteria Avenue (CR 639) in Cherry Hill	
CR 637	0.54	0.87	Cuthbert Boulevard (CR 636) and Wisteria Avenue (CR 639) in Cherry Hill	Magnolia Avenue	Chapel Avenue (CR 626) on the Pennsauken Township/Merchantville border	
CR 638	0.55	0.89	Chapel Avenue (CR 626) on the Pennsauken Township/Merchantville border	Clayton Avenue	Cuthbert Boulevard (CR 636) and Wisteria Avenue (CR 639) in Cherry Hill	
CR 639	0.30	0.48	Lexington Avenue (CR 613) in Pennsauken Township	Wisteria Avenue	Cuthbert Boulevard (CR 636) and Magnolia Avenue (CR 637) in Cherry Hill	
CR 640	0.67	1.08	Haddon Avenue (CR 561) in Collingswood	Fern Avenue	Cuthbert Boulevard (CR 636) in Haddon Township	
CR 641	2.38	3.83	Kings Highway (Route 41/CR 573) in Haddonfield	West End Avenue, West Park Boulevard, Park Avenue	Collings Avenue (CR 630) in Collingswood	
CR 642	0.66	1.06	Haddon Avenue (CR 561) in Haddon Township	Maple Avenue	Grove Street (CR 644) in Haddonfield	
CR 643	1.56	2.51	Kings Highway (CR 551 Spur) on the Audubon/Haddon Township border	Crystal Lake Avenue	Haddon Avenue (CR 561) in Haddon Township	
CR 644	6.48	10.43	Haddon Avenue (CR 561) in Haddonfield	Potter Street, Grove Street, Haddonfield Road	US 130 and Route 73 in Pennsauken Township	
CR 645	0.40	0.64	White Horse Pike (US 30) in Audubon	Graisbury Avenue	Hopkins Avenue (CR 647) on the Audubon/Haddon Township border	
CR 646	1.13	1.82	Hopkins Avenue (CR 647) on the Audubon/Haddon Township border	Avondale Avenue	Kings Highway (CR 551 Spur) in Haddonfield	
CR 647	1.12	1.80	Kings Highway (CR 551 Spur) on the Audubon/Haddon Township/Haddon Heights tripoint border	Hopkins Avenue, Hood Avenue	Cuthbert Boulevard (CR 636) on the Audubon/Haddon Township border	
CR 648	0.88	1.42	White Horse Pike (US 30) in Oaklyn	East Bettlewood Avenue	Collings Avenue (CR 630) in Collingswood	
CR 649	0.38	0.61	Kendall Boulevard (CR 650) in Oaklyn	West Clinton Avenue	White Horse Pike (US 30) in Oaklyn	
CR 650	1.15	1.85	Black Horse Pike (Route 168) in Oaklyn	Kendall Boulevard	Congress Avenue (CR 651) in Oaklyn	
CR 651	0.15	0.24	Kendall Boulevard (CR 650) in Oaklyn	Congress Avenue	Manor Avenue (CR 652/CR 743) in Oaklyn	
CR 652	0.15	0.24	Nicholson Road (CR 635) in Audubon	Manor Avenue	Congress Avenue (CR 651) and Manor Avenue (CR 743) in Oaklyn	
CR 653	2.16	3.48	Clements Bridge Road (Route 41/CR 573) in Barrington	3rd Avenue, 9th Avenue, Kings Highway, Wyoming Avenue	Nicholson Road (CR 635) in Audubon	
CR 654	1.15	1.85	Black Horse Pike (Route 168) on the Haddon Heights/Mount Ephraim border	Prospect Ridge Boulevard	10th Avenue (CR 655) in Haddon Heights	
CR 655	0.13	0.21	Prospect Ridge Boulevard (CR 654) in Haddon Heights	10th Avenue	Station Avenue (CR 656) and South Park Avenue (CR 661 Spur) in Haddon Heights	
CR 656	1.47	2.37	Station Avenue (CR 655) and South Park Avenue (CR 661 Spur) in Haddon Heights	Station Avenue, South Hinchman Avenue	Clements Bridge Road (Route 41/CR 573) in Haddonfield	
CR 657	0.36	0.58	Station Avenue (CR 656) in Haddonfield	South Hinchman Avenue, North Hinchman Avenue	Homestead Avenue in Haddonfield	
CR 658	0.87	1.40	Browning Road (CR 659) in Bellmawr	Bell Road	Black Horse Pike (Route 168) in Mount Ephraim	
CR 659	4.30	6.92	Crescent Boulevard (US 130) in Brooklawn	Browning Lane, Browning Road, Gloucester Pike	White Horse Pike (US 30) in Lawnside	
CR 660	0.67	1.08	Black Horse Pike (Route 168) in Mount Ephraim	Valley Road, East Lake Drive	Kings Highway (CR 551 Spur) on the Audubon/Haddon Heights border	
CR 661	1.08	1.74	Kings Highway (CR 551 Spur) and East Lake Drive (CR 660) on the Audubon/Haddon Heights border	Hillside Avenue, North Park Avenue, South Park Avenue, Glover Avenue, North Park Avenue	Station Avenue (CR 656) in Haddon Heights	
CR 661 Spur	0.09	0.14	South Park Avenue (CR 661) in Haddon Heights	South Park Avenue	Bellmawr Avenue in Haddon Heights	
CR 662	0.85	1.37	Marlton Pike (CR 601) on the Camden/Pennsauken Township border	Highland Avenue, Myrtle Avenue	Crescent Boulevard (US 130) on the Camden/Pennsauken Township border	
CR 663	0.24	0.39	Crescent Boulevard (US 130) in Pennsauken Township	Terrace Avenue	Federal Street (CR 537) on the Camden/Pennsauken Township border	
CR 664	0.21	0.34	Crescent Boulevard (US 130) in Pennsauken Township	Woodland Avenue	Marlton Pike (CR 601) in Pennsauken Township	
CR 665	0.48	0.77	Clements Bridge Road (Route 41/CR 573) on the Barrington/Haddon Heights border	Hutchinson Avenue	Warwick Road (CR 669) on the Barrington/Haddonfield border	
CR 666	0.63	1.01	White Horse Pike (US 30) in Barrington	Copley Road	Warwick Road (CR 669) at the Barrington/Lawnside/Tavistock tripoint border	
CR 667	1.56	2.51	Warwick Road (CR 669) in Lawnside	Oak Avenue, Melrose Avenue, Woodcrest Road	Burnt Mill Road (CR 670) in Cherry Hill	
CR 668	1.14	1.83	Warwick Road (CR 669) in Lawnside	Charleston Avenue	Evesham Road (CR 544) on the Lawnside/Somerdale border	
CR 669	6.28	10.11	White Horse Pike (US 30) in Lindenwold	Stone Road, Warwick Road	Kings Highway (Route 41/CR 573) in Haddonfield	
CR 670	3.16	5.09	Gibbsboro–Kirkwood Road (CR 684) in Voorhees Township	Burnt Mill Road	Haddonfield–Berlin Road (CR 561) in Cherry Hill	
CR 671	6.18	9.95	Haddonfield–Berlin Road (CR 561) in Cherry Hill	Kresson Road	Route 73 in Voorhees Township	
CR 673	11.38	18.31	Black Horse Pike (Route 168) on the Gloucester/Washington township line	College Drive, Laurel Road, White Horse Road, Springdale Road	Springdale Road (CR 673) at the Burlington County line in Cherry Hill	
CR 674	1.07	1.72	Marlton Pike (Route 70) in Cherry Hill	Greentree Road	Greentree Road at the Burlington County line in Cherry Hill	
CR 675	8.11	13.05	Hopewell Road on the Berlin/Waterford township line	Cooper Road, Cropwell Road	Burlington County line in Cherry Hill	
CR 676	1.05	1.69	Black Horse Pike (Route 168) in Gloucester Township	Old Black Horse Pike	Chews Landing Road (CR 683) and Somerdale Road (CR 677) in Gloucester Township	
CR 677	2.76	4.44	Old Black Horse Pike (CR 676) and Chews Landing Road (CR 683) in Gloucester Township	Somerdale Road, Ogg Avenue	White Horse Pike (US 30) in Somerdale	
CR 678	2.13	3.43	Somerdale Road (CR 677) and Ogg Avenue (CR 677) in Somerdale	Somerdale Road	Evesham Road (CR 544) and Haddonfield–Berlin Road (CR 561) on the Cherry Hill/Voorhees township line	
CR 679	0.79	1.27	Somerdale Road (CR 678) in Voorhees Township	Preston Avenue	Evesham Road (CR 544) in Voorhees Township	
CR 680	2.53	4.07	Route 73/CR 561 in Winslow Township	Tom Wells Road, Center Avenue	White Horse Pike (US 30) on the Chesilhurst/Winslow Township border	
CR 681	2.55	4.10	Good Intent Road (CR 681) at the Gloucester County line in Gloucester Township	Good Intent Road, Lower Landing Road	Chews Landing Road (CR 683) in Gloucester Township	
CR 682	0.84	1.35	Clements Bridge Road (Route 41) and Evesham Road (CR 544) on the Gloucester Township/Runnemede border	Station Avenue	Black Horse Pike (Route 168) in Gloucester Township	
CR 683	4.49	7.23	Black Horse Pike (Route 168) in Gloucester Township	Chews Landing Road	Blackwood–Clementon Road (CR 534) in Clementon	
CR 684	1.93	3.11	White Horse Road (CR 673) in Voorhees Township	Gibbsboro–Kirkwood Road, Kirkwood Road	Clementon Road (CR 686) in Gibbsboro	
CR 685	2.58	4.15	Berlin Road (CR 561) in Gibbsboro	Marlton Avenue, Kresson–Gibbsboro Road	Kresson Road (CR 671) in Voorhees Township	
CR 686	2.88	4.63	Blackwood–Clementon Road (CR 534) and Erial Road (CR 703) in Clementon	Gibbsboro Road, Clementon–Gibbsboro Road, Clementon Road	Centennial Boulevard and Old Egg Harbor Road on the Gibbsboro/Voorhees Township border	
CR 687	4.98	8.01	Sicklerville Road (CR 705) in Gloucester Township	Jarvis Road, Branch Avenue	Blackwood–Clementon Road (CR 534) on the Lindenwold/Pine Hill border	
CR 688	4.81	7.74	Sicklerville Road (CR 705) in Gloucester Township	Hickstown Road, Turnersville–Hickstown Road	Berlin–Cross Keys Road (CR 689) on the Pine Hill/Winslow Township border	
CR 689	6.86	11.04	Berlin–Cross Keys Road (CR 689) at the Gloucester County line on the Winslow/Gloucester township line	Berlin–Cross Keys Road	Route 73 in Berlin Township	
CR 690	1.44	2.32	New Freedom Road (CR 691) in Berlin	Park Drive	White Horse Pike (US 30) in Berlin	
CR 691	3.50	5.63	White Horse Pike (US 30) in Clementon	New Freedom Road, Watsontown–New Freedom Road	New Freedom Road (CR 720) in Winslow Township	
CR 692	1.66	2.67	Berlin–Clementon Road (CR 534) in Berlin	Franklin Avenue	Route 73 in Berlin Township	
CR 693	1.03	1.66	Haddonfield–Berlin Road (CR 561) in Voorhees Township	Lafayette Avenue	Route 73 in Voorhees Township	CR 693 was proposed to be part of a Berlin–Lindenwold Bypass.
CR 694	1.39	2.24	Dead end in Pine Hill	East Atlantic Avenue	Berlin Road (CR 534) in Clementon	
CR 695	0.76	1.22	Berlin Road (CR 534) in Clementon	White Horse Avenue	White Horse Pike (US 30) in Lindenwold	
CR 696	0.97	1.56	Chews Landing Road (CR 683) in Lindenwold	Park Avenue	Stone Road (CR 669) on the Laurel Springs/Lindenwold border	
CR 697	0.38	0.61	Stone Road (CR 669) in Laurel Springs	Broadway	White Horse Pike (US 30) on the Laurel Springs/Lindenwold border	
CR 698	0.88	1.42	Laurel Road (CR 673) in Lindenwold	Lake Boulevard	Park Avenue (CR 696) in Lindenwold	
CR 699	2.11	3.40	White Horse Pike (US 30) on the Clementon/Lindenwold border	United States Avenue	South Lakeview Drive (CR 561) in Gibbsboro	
CR 700	1.39	2.24	White Horse Pike (US 30) in Lindenwold	Linden Avenue, Carlton Street, Norcross Avenue	Hilliards Road (CR 701) in Gibbsboro	
CR 701	0.75	1.21	Clementon Road (CR 686) in Gibbsboro	Hilliards Road	Kirkwood Road (CR 684) in Gibbsboro	
CR 702	4.50	7.24	White Horse Pike (US 30) on the Somerdale/Stratford border	Berlin Road, Gibbsboro Road, Egg Harbor Road, Franklin Avenue, Chestnut Avenue, Egg Harbor Road	Clementon Road (CR 534) in Berlin	
CR 703	2.60	4.18	New Brooklyn–Erial Road (CR 706) in Gloucester Township	Erial–Clementon Road, Erial Road	Blackwood–Clementon Road (CR 534) and Gibbsboro Road (CR 686) in Clementon	
CR 704	4.79	7.71	Williamstown Road (CR 536 Spur) in Winslow Township	Erial–lWilliamstown Road, Sicklerville Road, Chews Landing Road, Erial–Williamstown Road	Erial Road (CR 706) in Gloucester Township	
CR 705	7.67	12.34	Malaga Road (CR 536) and Cedarbrook Road (CR 536) in Winslow Township	Sicklerville Road	Sicklerville Road (CR 705) at the Gloucester County line in Gloucester Township	
CR 706	11.47	18.46	Sicklerville Road (CR 705) in Winslow Township	New Brooklyn–Blackwood Road, Erial Road, Blackwood–Clementon Road, Blenheim–Erial Road, Alomnesson Road	Cooper Street (CR 706) at the Gloucester County line in Gloucester Township	
CR 707	0.76	1.22	Sicklerville Road (CR 705) at the Gloucester County line in Gloucester Township	Woodbury–Turnersville Road	County House Road (CR 621) at the Gloucester County line in Gloucester Township	
CR 708 (1)	0.17	0.27	Haddon Avenue (CR 561) in Berlin Township	Zulker Avenue	Walker Avenue (CR 708) in Berlin Township	
CR 708 (2)	0.69	1.11	Route 73 in Berlin Township	Walker Avenue	Haddon Avenue (CR 561) in Berlin Township	
CR 709	0.63	1.01	Old White Horse Pike (CR 716) in Waterford Township	East Atlantic Avenue	Bartram Avenue (CR 712) in Waterford Township	
CR 710	3.36	5.41	West Taunton Road (CR 536 Spur) and New Freedom Road (CR 720) in Winslow Township	West Factory Road, East Factory Road, Hayes Mill Road, Atco Avenue	Jackson Road (CR 534) in Waterford Township	
CR 711	1.75	2.82	New Brooklyn Road (CR 720) in Winslow Township	Norcross Road	Route 73/CR 561 in Winslow Township	
CR 712	2.05	3.30	Route 73/CR 561 in Winslow Township	Cooper Folly Road, Bartram Avenue	Raritan Avenue (CR 713) in Waterford Township	
CR 713	3.79	6.10	Tremont Avenue (CR 714) in Waterford Township	Raritan Avenue, Cooper Road	Jackson Road (CR 534) in Waterford Township	
CR 714	0.95	1.53	Raritan Avenue (CR 713) in Waterford Township	Tremont Avenue	Jackson Road (CR 534) in Waterford Township	
CR 715	1.09	1.75	Raritan Avenue (CR 713) in Waterford Township	3rd Street	Jackson Road (CR 534) in Waterford Township	
CR 716	4.61	7.42	Spring Garden Road (Route 143) and White Horse Pike (US 30) in Winslow Township	Old White Horse Pike	Burnt Mill Road in Waterford Township	
CR 717	0.44	0.71	White Horse Pike (US 30) in Waterford Township	Hendricks Avenue	Old White Horse Pike (CR 716) in Waterford Township	
CR 718	1.66	2.67	Pump Branch Road (CR 536) in Winslow Township	4th Avenue, Garfield Avenue	White Horse Pike (US 30) in Chesilhurst	
CR 719	2.44	3.93	Zimmerman Avenue in Chesilhurst	Washington Avenue, Vineyard Road	White Horse Pike (US 30) in Winslow Township	
CR 720	8.94	14.39	Route 73/CR 561 in Winslow Township	Blue Anchor Road, Cedarbrook Road, New Brooklyn Road, New Freedom Road	Tansboro Road (CR 561) in Berlin	
CR 721	2.51	4.04	Route 73/CR 561 in Winslow Township	East Central Avenue	Spring Garden Road (Route 143) in Winslow Township	
CR 722	2.88	4.63	Route 73/CR 561 in Winslow Township	Waterford Road	White Horse Pike (US 30) in Winslow Township	
CR 723	4.88	7.85	Winslow Road at the Gloucester County line in Winslow Township	Fleming Pike	White Horse Pike (US 30) in Winslow Township	
CR 724	0.98	1.58	3rd Street (CR 724) at the Atlantic County line in Winslow Township	Wiltseys Mill Road	White Horse Pike (US 30) in Winslow Township	
CR 725	2.16	3.48	Route 73/CR 561 Spur in Winslow Township	Albertson Road, Hall Street	South Egg Harbor Road (CR 561) in Winslow Township	
CR 726	0.80	1.29	Hall Street (CR 725) in Winslow Township	Hay Road	South Egg Harbor Road (CR 561) and Spring Garden Road (Route 143) in Winslow Township	
CR 727	6.85	11.02	Berlin Road (CR 534) in Clementon	Garfield Avenue, East Atlantic Avenue	Kings Highway (CR 551 Spur) and East Atlantic Avenue (CR 729) on the Audubon/Haddon Heights border	
CR 728	0.62	1.00	Blackwood–Clementon Road (CR 534) in Clementon	West Atlantic Avenue	Wallace Avenue on the Clementon/Lindenwold border	
CR 729	1.84	2.96	Kings Highway (CR 551 Spur) and East Atlantic Avenue (CR 727) on the Audubon/Haddon Heights border	East Atlantic Avenue, Newton Avenue	Dead end in Oaklyn	
CR 730	0.81	1.30	Merrick Avenue in Collingswood	Newton Lake Drive, Lakeshore Drive	Cuthbert Boulevard (CR 636) in Haddon Township	
CR 732	0.59	0.95	White Horse Pike (US 30) in Collingswood	Newton Lake Drive	Bettlewood Avenue (CR 648) in Collingswood	
CR 733	0.50	0.80	Berlin Road (CR 534) in Clementon	Higgins Avenue	White Horse Pike (US 30) in Clementon	
CR 734	0.41	0.66	White Horse Pike (US 30) in Waterford Township	Ohio Avenue	Old White Horse Pike (CR 716) in Waterford Township	
CR 736	0.55	0.89	Evesham Road (CR 544) on the Gloucester Township/Runnemede border	Schubert Avenue	Clements Bridge Road (Route 41/CR 573) in Runnemede	
CR 737	0.16	0.26	Federal Street (CR 537) in Camden	Delaware Avenue	Market Street (CR 537 Spur) in Camden	
CR 739	0.09	0.14	Newton Avenue (CR 729) in Oaklyn	Capitol Avenue	White Horse Pike (US 30) on the Audubon/Oaklyn border	
CR 740	0.32	0.51	Magnolia Avenue in Camden	Park Boulevard	Baird Boulevard (CR 608) in Camden	
CR 742	0.09	0.14	East Lake Drive (CR 660) in Audubon	Oak Avenue	Hampshire Avenue in Audubon	
CR 743	0.34	0.55	Kendall Boulevard (CR 650) in Oaklyn	Oakland Avenue, Manor Avenue	Congress Avenue (CR 651) and Manor Avenue (CR 652) in Oaklyn	
CR 744	0.89	1.43	Kings Highway (CR 551 Spur) on the Audubon/Haddon Heights border	West Atlantic Avenue	Nicholson Road (CR 635) and Manor Avenue (CR 652) in Audubon	
CR 745	0.05	0.08	Gibbsboro Road (CR 684) in Voorhees Township	Spruce Avenue	Burnt Mill Road (CR 670) in Voorhees Township	
CR 747	0.70	1.13	Woodbury–Turnersville Road (CR 707) in Gloucester Township	Lakeland Road	Black Horse Pike (Route 168) in Gloucester Township	
CR 748	1.05	1.69	Mount Pleasant Road (CR 749) in Gloucester Township	County House Road	Woodbury–Turnersville Road (CR 705) in Gloucester Township	
CR 749	0.87	1.40	County House Road (CR 748) in Gloucester Township	Mount Pleasant Road	Blackwood–Barnsboro Road (CR 603) at the Gloucester County line in Gloucester Township|	
CR 750	0.31	0.50	Dead end in Gloucester Township	Collier Drive	Woodbury–Turnersville Road (CR 707) in Gloucester Township	
CR 751	0.41	0.66	Berlin–Cross Keys Road (CR 689) in Berlin	Park Drive	Park Drive (CR 690) in Berlin	
CR 753	2.37	3.81	Route 47/CR 551 in Brooklawn	Creek Road	Browning Road (CR 659) in Bellmawr	
CR 755	0.28	0.45	Broadway (CR 551) in Gloucester City	Essex Street	Johnson Boulevard in Gloucester City	
CR 756	0.08	0.13	Federal Street (CR 537) in Camden	North 6th Street	Market Street (CR 537 Spur) in Camden	
CR 757 (1)	0.15	0.24	Kings Highway (Route 41/CR 573) in Haddonfield	Evans Mill Road	Dead end on the Cherry Hill/Haddonfield border	
CR 757 (2)	0.36	0.58	Dead end on the Cherry Hill/Haddonfield border	Bortons Mill Road	Brace Road (Route 154) in Cherry Hill	
CR 758	0.45	0.72	Windsor Avenue in Haddon Township	Coles Mill Road	Grove Street (CR 644) in Haddonfield	
CR 759	3.84	6.18	Hickstown Road (CR 688) in Gloucester Township	Peter Cheeseman–Little Gloucester Road, Little Gloucester Road	Chews Landing Road (CR 683) in Gloucester Township	
CR 760	0.74	1.19	River Road (CR 543) in Pennsauken Township	Sherman Avenue	Westfield Avenue (CR 610) in Pennsauken Township	
CR 761	0.31	0.50	Black Horse Pike (Route 168) in Gloucester Township	Zimmerman Drive	Route 42 and Premium Outlets Drive (CR 762) in Gloucester Township	
CR 762	0.30	0.48	College Drive (CR 673) in Gloucester Township	Premium Outlets Drive	Route 42 and Zimmerman Drive (CR 761) in Gloucester Township	
CR 763	0.28	0.45	Premium Outlets Drive (CR 762) in Gloucester Township	Robert E. Kelly Boulevard	Commencement Road (CR 764) in Gloucester Township	
CR 764	0.16	0.26	College Drive (CR 673) in Gloucester Township	Commencement Road	Route 42 and Love Drive (CR 765) in Gloucester Township	
CR 765	0.35	0.56	College Drive (CR 673) in Gloucester Township	Love Drive	Route 42 and Commencement Road (CR 764) in Gloucester Township	
CR 783	0.22	0.35	Black Horse Pike (Route 168) in Haddon Heights	Berwick Avenue	Blenheim Avenue in Haddon Heights	
