= Almonesson, New Jersey =

Populated place in Gloucester County, New Jersey, US

- Unincorporated community
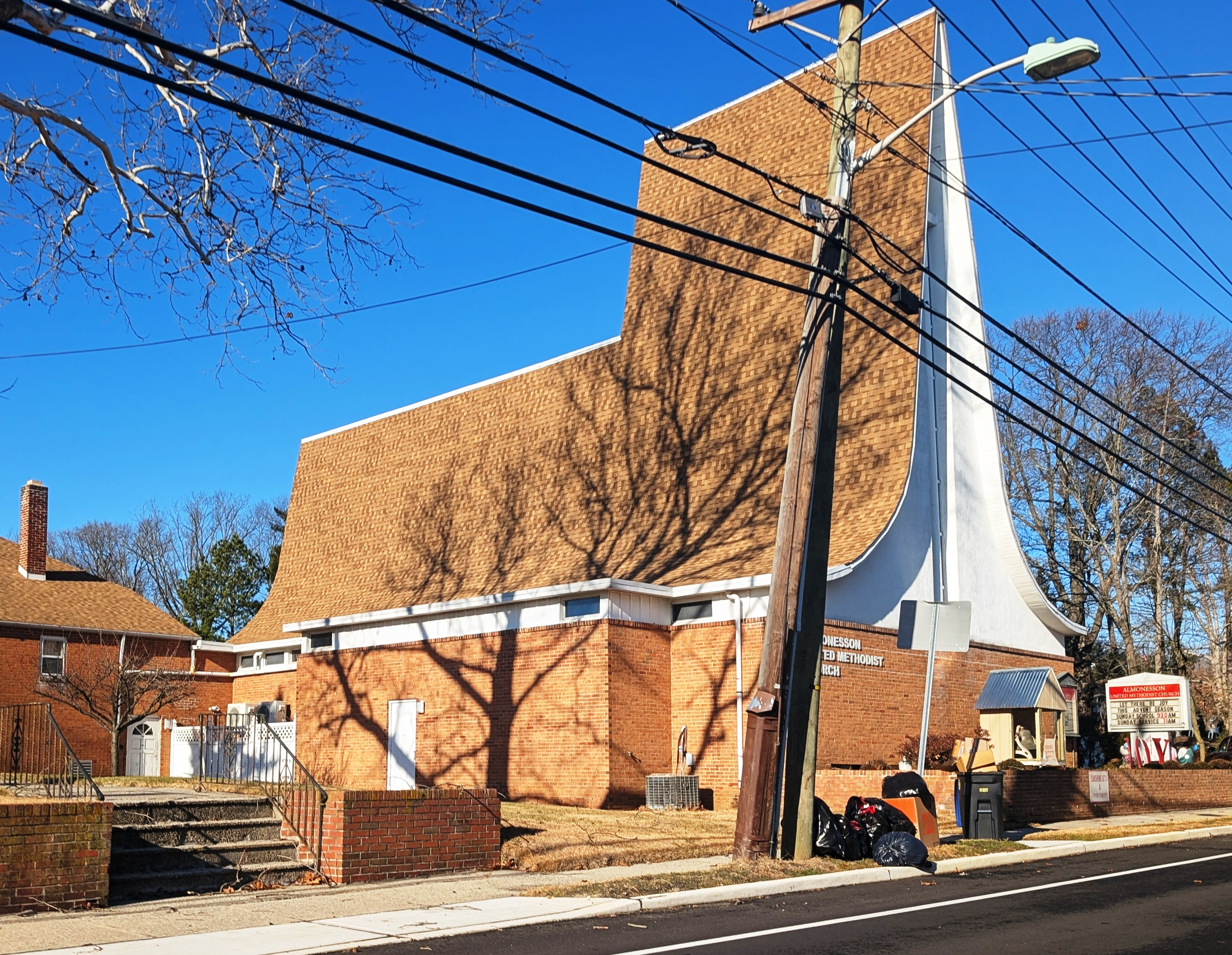
- Almonesson United Methodist Church

- Location in Gloucester County Location in New Jersey Location in the United States
- Coordinates: 39°49′08″N 75°05′55″W
- Country: United States
- State: New Jersey
- County: Gloucester
- Township: Deptford
- Elevation: 39 ft (12 m)
- Time zone: UTC−05:00 (Eastern (EST))
  - Summer (DST): UTC−04:00 (EDT)
- GNIS feature ID: 874314

Almonesson is an unincorporated community located within Deptford Township, Gloucester County, in the U.S. state of New Jersey. It is accessible by Route 41, Route 42, Route 55, County Route 534, and County Route 544. The Deptford Mall is located just north of the center of Almonesson.

Almonesson Lake, colloquially referred to as Sunset Bay, is a large lake in the community, which at one time produced significant amounts of ice each winter. The name Almonesson derives from a Native American name meaning "young fox place".

== Notable people ==
People who were born in, residents of, or otherwise closely associated with Almonesson include:

- Mel Sheppard (1883–1942), winner of four gold medals at the 1908 Summer Olympics and 1912 Summer Olympics.
