= Old Marlton Pike =

Old Marlton Pike may refer to:

- County Route 600 (Burlington County, New Jersey)
- County Route 600 (Camden County, New Jersey)

== See also ==
- New Jersey Route 70, also known as Marlton Pike, which runs parallel to the above roads
