= New Jersey Route 143 =

State highway in Winslow Township, Camden County, New Jersey, US

Route 143
- Spring Garden Road

Route information
- Maintained by NJDOT
- Length: 2.35 mi (3.78 km)
- Existed: June 14, 1989–present

Major junctions
- South end: CR 561 / CR 726 in Winslow Township
- North end: US 30 / CR 716 in Winslow Township

Location
- Country: United States
- State: New Jersey
- Counties: Camden

Highway system
- New Jersey State Highway Routes; Interstate; US; State; Scenic Byways
← Route 140	→ Route 147

Route 143 is a 2.43-mile (3.91 km) state highway in Camden County, New Jersey, United States. It is a short route in Winslow Township, running along Spring Garden Road between Cedarbrook Road and White Horse Pike (US 30). The route's southern terminus is at an intersection with County Route 561 (CR 561) and CR 726 in Winslow Township. The route heads along the old alignment of New Jersey Route 43, intersecting with US 30 and ending a short distance afterward, where it continues as CR 716.

The use of this route number reflects the former designation of the White Horse Pike as Route 43. Route 43 itself, dates back to the original state highway system in New Jersey, which it was designated as State Highway Route 3. The route was renumbered 43 in the 1927 state highway renumbering, using most of US 30 for its alignment. The route remained intact until 1953, when another renumbering occurred, decommissioning Route 43 entirely. The highway was revived in a short portion in 1955, receiving a designation in 1989.

== Route description ==
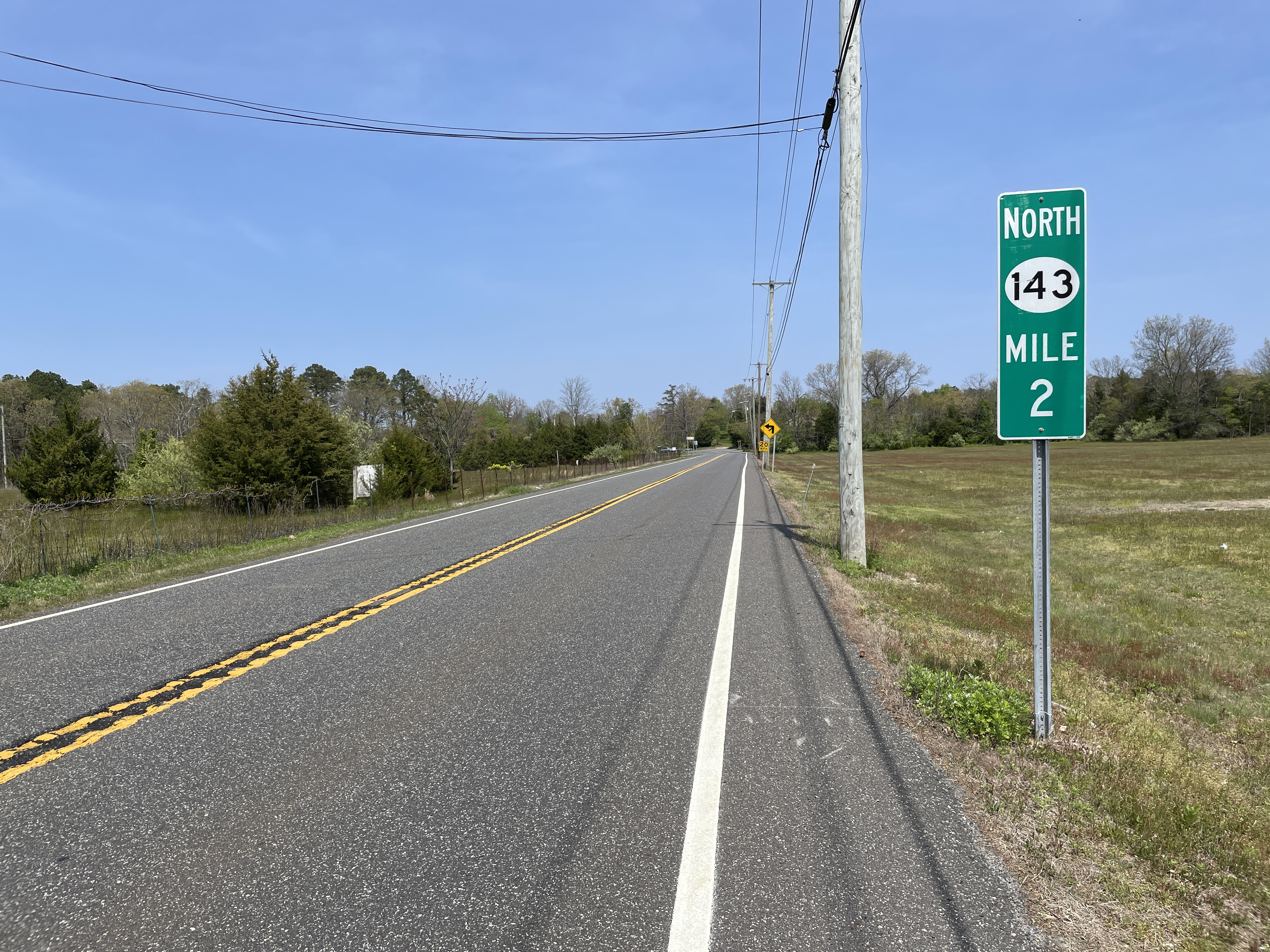
Route 143 northbound approaching CR 721 in Winslow Township

Route 143 begins at CR 561 and CR 726 in Winslow Township. Known as Spring Garden Road, it proceeds north-northeast through wooded residential areas. The route crosses Conrail Shared Assets Operations' Beesleys Point Secondary railroad line before intersecting Woodland Drive. From this point, the road passes to the east of the Ancora Psychiatric Hospital and intersects Center Drive before coming to Lake Drive. Following this intersection, it passes between several small sized lakes within heavily forested areas before heading through some farm fields. Here, the road intersects CR 721 (East Central Avenue). A short distance later, Route 143 crosses US 30 and continues for a little bit to the end of state maintenance. At this point, the road becomes CR 716 and continues north.

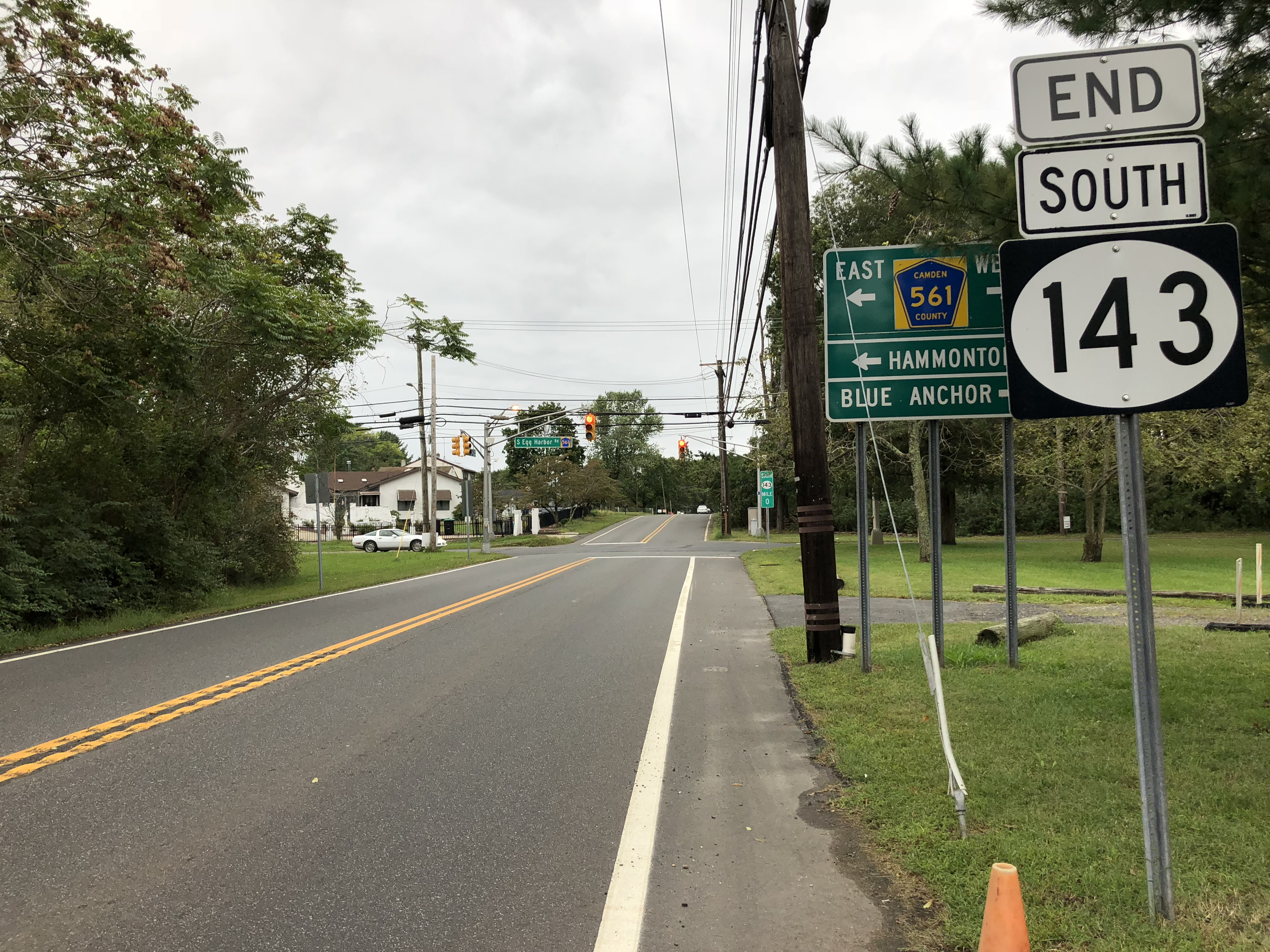
Route 143 southbound approaching CR 561 in Winslow Township

== History ==
The earliest possible evidence of state maintenance of Spring Garden Road came in 1955, when a portion of highway called Route 43 was contracted to be rebuilt north of a crossing with the Pennsylvania Railroad as Section 11E of the highway. However, no maps from then up to its designation as Route 143 in 1989 showed the highway being under state maintenance; in 1965, the road was shown to be designated as an extension of CR 726. Two explanations have been proposed for this discrepancy: either the highway referred to was US 30, which had been designated NJ 43 until 1953, or the highway was reverted to local maintenance soon after its reconstruction. The route received its designation of Route 143 on June 14, 1989 when the State Legislature approved the new designation.

== Major intersections ==
The entire route is in Winslow Township, Camden County.

mi	km	Destinations	Notes
0.00	0.00	CR 561 (Egg Harbor Road) / CR 726 south (Hay Road) – Hammonton, Blue Anchor	Southern terminus; northern terminus of CR 726
2.27	3.65	US 30 (White Horse Pike)	
2.35	3.78	CR 716 north (Old White Horse Pike)	Continuation north
1.000 mi = 1.609 km; 1.000 km = 0.621 mi
