= New Jersey Route 140 =

State highway in Carneys Point Township, Salem County, New Jersey, United States

Route 140
- Hawks Bridge Road

Route information
- Maintained by NJDOT
- Length: 0.96 mi (1,540 m)
- Existed: 1977–present

Major junctions
- West end: US 130 / CR 540 in Carneys Point Township
- I-295 in Carneys Point Township
- East end: N.J. Turnpike / US 40 / CR 540 in Carneys Point Township

Location
- Country: United States
- State: New Jersey
- Counties: Salem

Highway system
- New Jersey State Highway Routes; Interstate; US; State; Scenic Byways
← Route 139	→ Route 143

Route 140 is a 0.96-mile (1.54 km) state highway in Carneys Point Township, Salem County, New Jersey, United States. It is a short east–west connector in Deepwater between U.S. Route 130 (US 130; Shell Road) and both the New Jersey Turnpike and U.S. Route 40 (Wiley Road) in Carneys Point near the Delaware Memorial Bridge. It is completely concurrent with County Route 540 (CR 540). Because of its close proximity to these major arteries (as well as Interstate 295 or I-295), there are numerous truck stops, motels, and diners along this highway, despite its short .96-mile (1.54 km) length. Also, the main entrance to the DuPont Chamber Works facility is located at the end on US Route 130.

== Route description ==
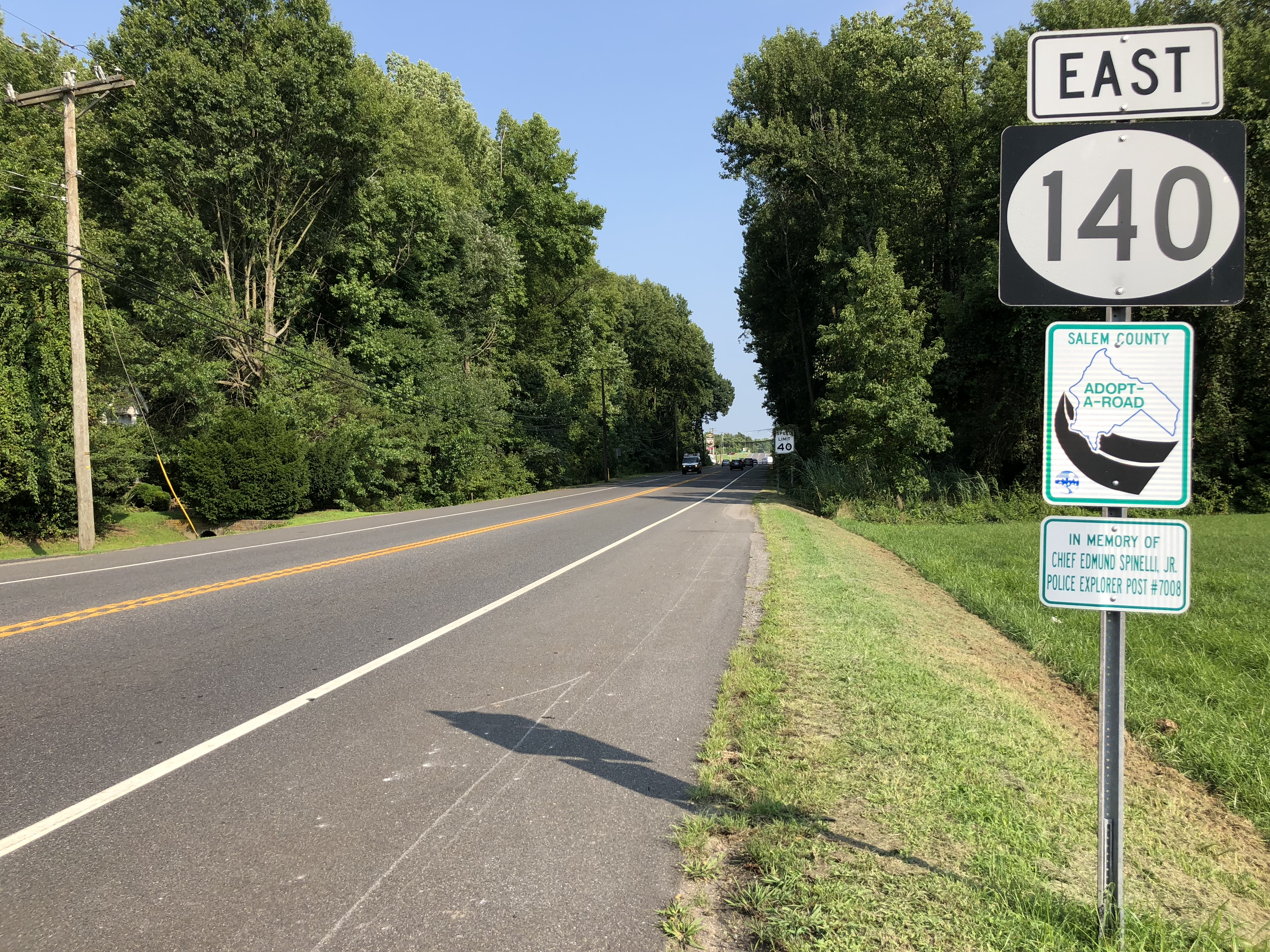
View east along Route 140 at US 130 in Carneys Point Township

Route 140 begins at U.S. Route 130 in the community of Deepwater, New Jersey. The route heads eastward as Hawks Bridge Road, passing through forestry east of the DuPont riverside factory. The large portion of forestry breaks up into a large clearing. In this large clearing, Route 140 passes between two truck stops. The route continues, intersecting with the on-ramps to Interstate 295. Route 140 then crosses over the interstate and settles back on land. From there, Route 140 crosses to the north of another truck stop and intersects with County Route 551 (South Pennsville-Auburn Road). Intersecting with local off-ramps, the route crosses by some businesses before interchanging with the New Jersey Turnpike and U.S. Route 40. The route continues a short distance after the interchange, terminating at Wiley Road, where it continues as County Route 540.

== History ==
Route 140 was first legislated by the New Jersey State Legislature in 1973 as a state highway from U.S. Route 130 to U.S. Route 40. The eastern two-thirds was state-maintained because of the Interstate 295 and the New Jersey Turnpike interchanges. The route remained unnumbered however. In 1977, the western third (U.S. Route 130 to Interstate 295) was taken over by the state and the route was designated Route 140 and has remained the same since the legislation.

== Major intersections ==
The entire route is in Carneys Point Township, Salem County.

mi	km	Destinations	Notes
0.00	0.00	US 130 (Shell Road) CR 540 begins	Western terminus; western terminus of CR 540
0.47	0.76	I-295 / CR 551 south – Delaware Memorial Bridge	Western end of CR 551 concurrency; exits 2B-C on I-295
0.66	1.06	CR 551 north (South Pennsville-Auburn Road) – Swedesboro	Eastern end of CR 551 concurrency
0.96	1.54	N.J. Turnpike / US 40 to I-295 south – Atlantic City, Delaware Memorial Bridge	Interchange; no eastbound access to NJTP south
0.96	1.54	CR 540 east	Continuation east; eastern end of CR 540 concurrency
1.000 mi = 1.609 km; 1.000 km = 0.621 mi
