= New Jersey Route 168 =

State highway in Camden and Gloucester counties in New Jersey, US

Route 168
- Major highways in the Camden area with Route 168 in red

Route information
- Maintained by NJDOT
- Length: 10.7 mi (17.2 km)
- Existed: 1959–present

Major junctions
- South end: Route 42 in Washington Township
- Route 42 in Gloucester Township; Route 41 in Runnemede; N.J. Turnpike at the Runnemede–Bellmawr line; I-295 in Bellmawr; Route 76C in Haddon Township; US 130 in Camden
- North end: CR 603 / CR 605 in Camden

Location
- Country: United States
- State: New Jersey
- Counties: Gloucester, Camden

Highway system
- New Jersey State Highway Routes; Interstate; US; State; Scenic Byways
← Route 167	→ Route 169

Route 168 is a 10.7-mile (17.22 km) state highway in the southern part of New Jersey. The route's southern terminus is an interchange with Route 42 and the Atlantic City Expressway in the Turnersville section of Washington Township, Gloucester County. The northern terminus is an intersection of Ferry Avenue (CR 603) on the border of Camden and Woodlynne in Camden County. At this point, the route continues toward Downtown Camden as Mt Ephraim Avenue (CR 605). Route 168 follows the Black Horse Pike for most of its length, running through suburban areas in Gloucester Township, Runnemede, Bellmawr, and Mount Ephraim. It intersects and interchanges many major roads, including the Route 42 freeway in Gloucester Township, Route 41 in Runnemede, the New Jersey Turnpike and I-295 in Bellmawr, Route 76C (an access ramp to I-76 and I-676) in Haddon Township, and US 130 in Camden.

What is now Route 168 runs along the Black Horse Pike, a turnpike established in 1855 that was to run from Camden to Atlantic City. In 1927, Route 42 was designated along this portion of road as part of its route between Camden and McKee City. In the 1940s, a freeway was proposed for Route 42 between Turnersville and the Camden area; construction began on this freeway in the 1950s. After this freeway was entirely completed in 1959, the Route 42 designation was moved to it and the former alignment of Route 42 along the Black Horse Pike north of Turnersville became Route 168.

== Route description ==
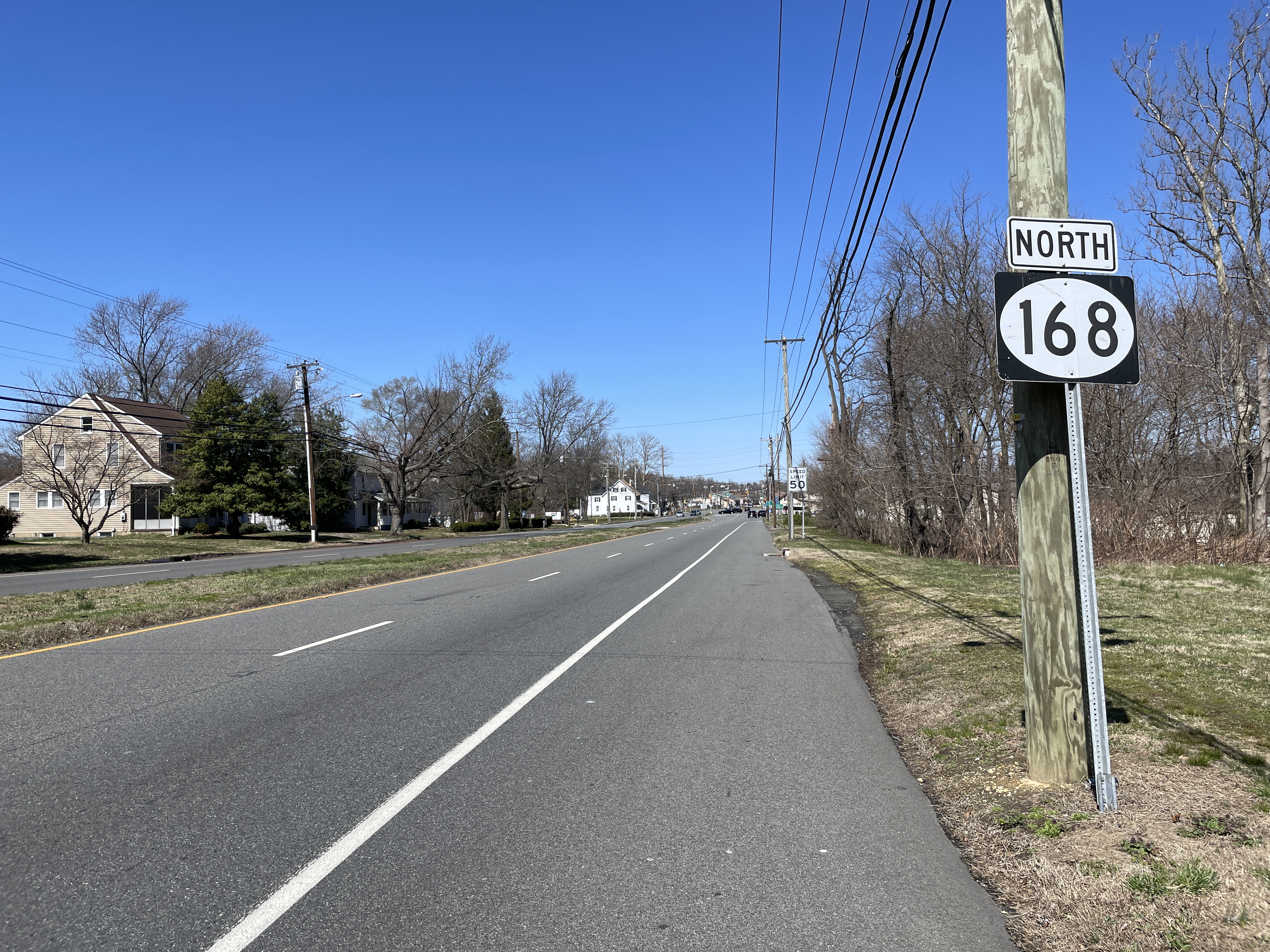
View north at the south end of Route 168 at Route 42 in Turnersville

Route 168 begins at an interchange with the west end of the Atlantic City Expressway, which feeds into Route 42 in the Turnersville section of Washington Township, Gloucester County; the North–South Freeway begins at that interchange, carrying Route 42 and through traffic from Atlantic City towards Camden. Meanwhile, Route 168 continues on Black Horse Pike as a four-lane divided surface road, with the route officially beginning at the intersection of Hurff Lane. Access from Route 168 south to Route 42 is provided via a one-way ramp continuing from the southern terminus of Route 168. However, northbound traffic from Route 42 must take the ramp to the freeway and exit immediately from the collector/distributor road onto northbound Sicklerville Road (CR 705) to access Route 168.

From here, Route 168 continues north through commercial areas before crossing the Big Timber Creek into Gloucester Township, Camden County, where it becomes a three-lane road with a center left-turn lane and immediately intersects with College Drive (CR 673), which provides access to Camden County College. The road heads west of the Gloucester Premium Outlets and passes through suburban areas of homes and businesses, coming to the intersection of Lakeland Road (CR 747). From here, the route heads through the Blackwood section of Gloucester Township, where it intersects with Church Street (CR 534). The route leaves the Blackwood area and comes to an intersection of Alomnesson Road/Erial Road (CR 706). The road passes businesses past this intersection as a three-lane road with two southbound lanes and one northbound lane before coming to an interchange with Route 42. At this interchange, there is full access between northbound Route 42 and Route 168 and between southbound Route 42 and Route 168.

Past the interchange with Route 42, the route intersects with Old Black Horse Pike (CR 676) and narrows to two lanes as it heads through commercial areas of Hilltop. It gains a center left-turn lane again before it crosses the intersection of Lower Landing Road (CR 681) and the North Branch of the Big Timber Creek. Route 168 comes to the intersection of Chews Landing Road (CR 683) and enters the Glendora section of Gloucester Township, where it heads into residential and commercial areas. Here, the route intersects with Station Avenue (CR 682). At the intersection of Evesham Road (CR 544), the road crosses into Runnemede and becomes a two-lane road. Route 168 crosses the intersection of Clements Bridge Road (Route 41/CR 573) and heads through the center of Runnemede. The center-left turn lane along the route returns before it comes to a double trumpet interchange with the New Jersey Turnpike on the border of Runnemede and Bellmawr. Past here, Route 168 passes more businesses and crosses the intersection of Browning Road (CR 659). A short distance later, the route comes to an interchange with I-295, where it becomes a four-lane undivided road.

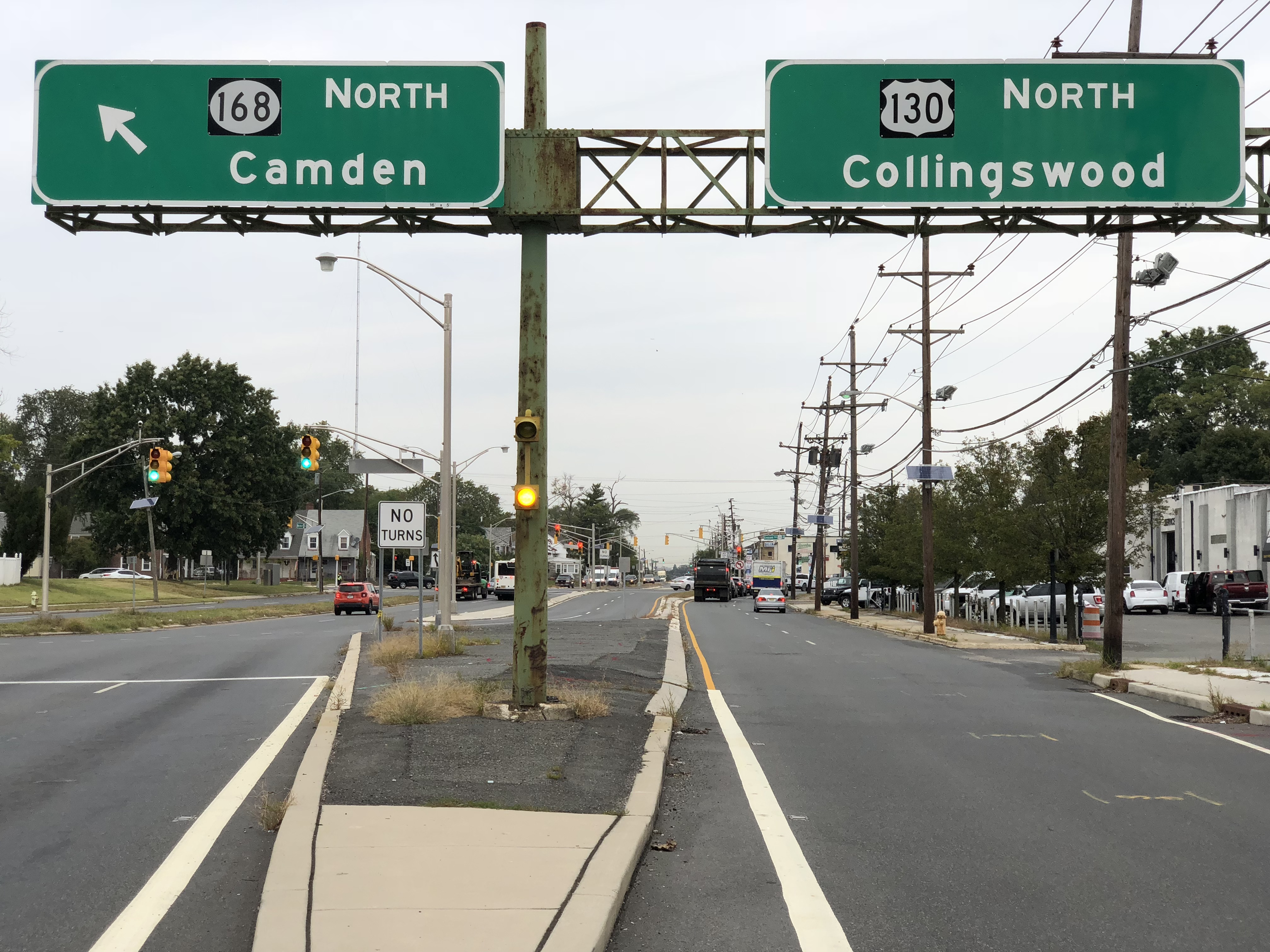
Route 168 northbound at US 130 on the border of Camden and Haddon Township

The route forms the border between Mount Ephraim to the west and Haddon Heights to the east past this interchange and intersects with Prospect Ridge Boulevard (CR 654) and Bell Road (CR 658). At the intersection with the latter, Route 168 entirely enters Mount Ephraim and crosses CR 551 Spur. Past this intersection, the road enters a mix of residential and commercial areas and comes to the intersection of Valley Road (CR 660). Upon crossing Audubon Lake, Route 168 forms the border between Haddon Township to the west and Audubon to the east and becomes a divided highway again with several jughandles. The route crosses the intersection of Nicholson Road (CR 635), where it becomes the border of Haddon Township and Audubon Park as a six-lane divided highway. An interchange with Route 76C provides access to I-76, I-676, and the Walt Whitman Bridge to and from the southbound direction of Route 168.

Immediately past this interchange, Route 168 narrows to four lanes and intersects with Kendall Boulevard (CR 650), crossing the Newton Creek, where it forms the border between Camden to the west and Haddon Township to the east. Here, the route crosses the channelized intersection of Crescent (US 130). After crossing over the channelized intersection of US 130, Route 168 drops the Black Horse Pike designation and becomes Mt Ephraim Avenue as is runs between the Fairview section of Camden and the West Collingswood Extension section of Haddon Township. Here, the route narrows to a two-lane undivided road and passes through urban areas. It crosses over the intersection of Collings Road/Collings Avenue (CR 630) before it becomes a three-lane road with a center left-turn lane and entirely enters Camden. The road crosses the North Branch of the Newton Creek, where it forms the border between Camden to the west and Woodlynne to the east. It becomes a four-lane undivided road that passes through industrial sectors before crossing Conrail Shared Assets Operations' Beesleys Point Secondary railroad line and heading past more urban development. Route 168 ends at the intersection of Ferry Avenue (CR 603), where Mt Ephraim Avenue continues north as CR 605 to Downtown Camden, ending at an intersection of Haddon Avenue (CR 561).

== History ==
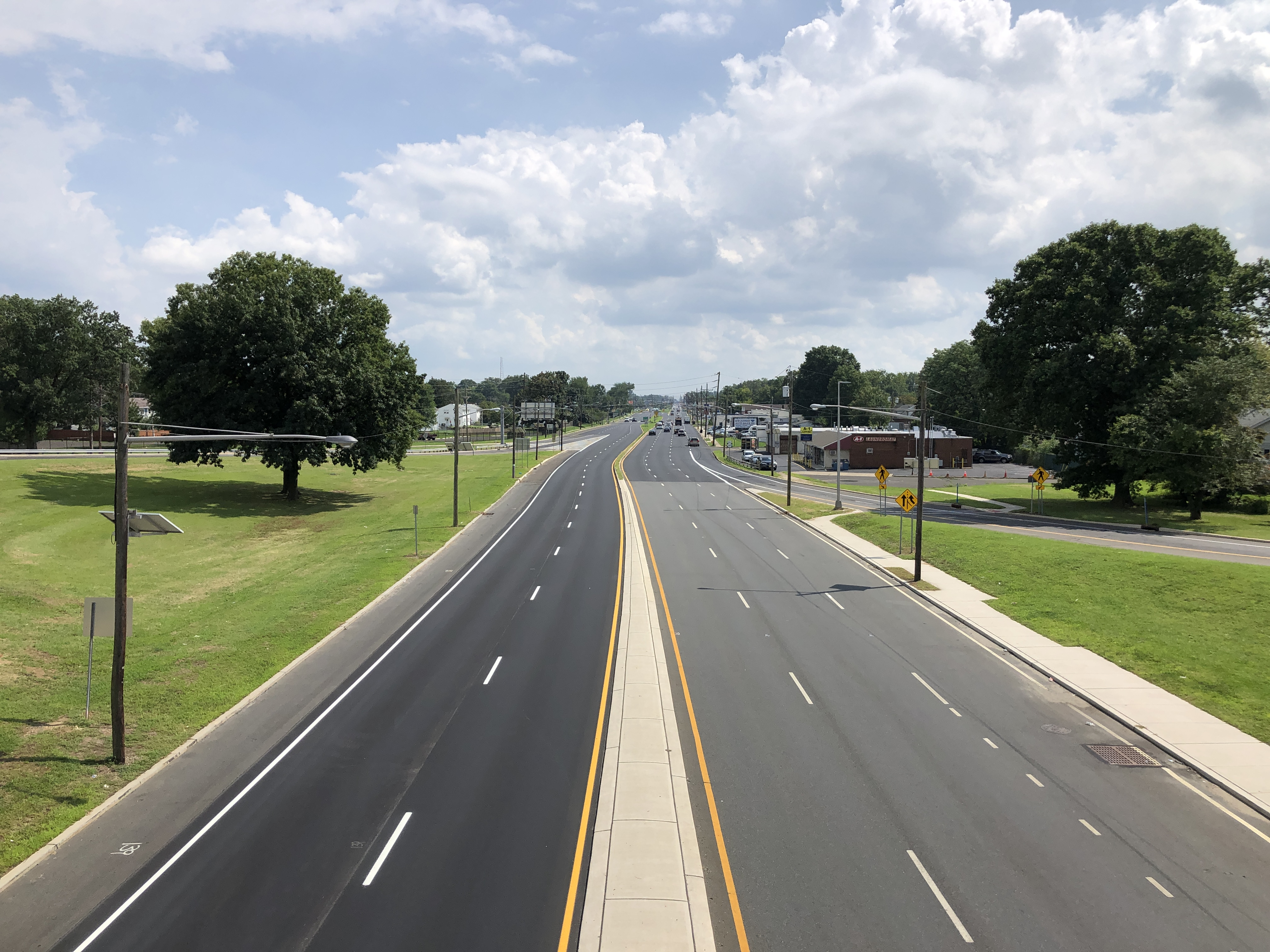
Route 168 southbound at Route 76C in Haddon Township

The predecessor to today's Route 168 was a set of Lenni Lenape trails that followed the Timber Creek. In 1855, the Camden and Blackwoodstown Turnpike Company was established by entrepreneurs who had helped create the White Horse Pike to build a gravel road that would run from Camden south to Blackwoodtown and eventually to Atlantic City; this road became the Black Horse Pike. The creation of the Black Horse Pike led to the development of several towns along the route. The Black Horse Pike was transferred from the turnpike company to the county in 1903, at a time where many private turnpikes would become public roads. In the 1927 New Jersey state highway renumbering, this portion of the Black Horse Pike was designated as part of a new route, Route 42, that was to run from Ferry Avenue in Camden south to Route 48 (now US 40) in McKee City. This portion of road retained the Route 42 designation in the 1953 New Jersey state highway renumbering.

In the late 1940s, a freeway was planned to bypass this portion of Route 42, with right-of-way acquisition and construction starting in the 1950s. This new freeway, called the North–South Freeway, opened between Bellmawr and the Black Horse Pike in Blackwood in 1958 and from Blackwood to Turnersville in 1959. With the opening of the freeway, the Route 42 designation was moved to the North–South Freeway and the Black Horse Pike between Turnersville and Camden became Route 168.

== Major intersections ==
County	Location	mi	km	Destinations	Notes
Gloucester	Washington Township	0.0	0.0	Route 42 south (Black Horse Pike)	Southern terminus; exit 7 on Route 42
Gloucester	Washington Township	0.2	0.32	CR 705 (Woodbury-Turnersville Road / Sicklerville Road) to Route 42 north – Sicklerville, Woodbury	
Camden	Gloucester Township	2.4	3.9	CR 534 (Church Street)	
Camden	Gloucester Township	3.4	5.5	Route 42 to A.C. Expressway east – Walt Whitman Bridge, Philadelphia, Williamstown, Atlantic City	No northbound access to Route 42 south; exits 9B-10A on Route 42
Camden	Runnemede	5.3	8.5	CR 544 (Evesham Road)	
Camden	Runnemede	5.7	9.2	Route 41 / CR 573 north (Clements Bridge Road) – Deptford, Barrington	Southern terminus of CR 573
Camden	Runnemede–Bellmawr line	6.6	10.6	N.J. Turnpike	Exit 3 on N.J. Turnpike
Camden	Bellmawr	7.4	11.9	I-295 – Trenton, Walt Whitman Bridge, Delaware Memorial Bridge	Exit 28 on I-295
Camden	Mount Ephraim	8.0	12.9	CR 551 Spur (Kings Highway) – Westville, Haddonfield	
Camden	Haddon Township	9.4	15.1	To I-76 Toll west (Walt Whitman Bridge) / I-676 north – Philadelphia	Interchange; northbound exit and southbound entrance; access via Route 76C
Camden	Camden	9.7	15.6	US 130 (Crescent Boulevard) – Collingswood	No left turns
Camden	Camden	10.7	17.2	CR 603 (Ferry Avenue) / CR 605 north (Mt. Ephraim Avenue)	Northern terminus; southern terminus of CR 605
1.000 mi = 1.609 km; 1.000 km = 0.621 mi: Incomplete access; Tolled
