= New Jersey Route 42 =

Highway in New Jersey

Route 42

Route information
- Maintained by NJDOT
- Length: 14.28 mi (22.98 km)
- Existed: 1927–present

Major junctions
- South end: US 322 / CR 536 Spur in Monroe Township
- A.C. Expressway / Route 168 / CR 705 in Washington Township; Route 168 in Gloucester Township; Route 41 in Deptford Township; Route 55 in Deptford Township; I-295 in Bellmawr
- North end: I-76 / I-295 in Bellmawr

Location
- Country: United States
- State: New Jersey
- Counties: Gloucester, Camden

Highway system
- New Jersey State Highway Routes; Interstate; US; State; Scenic Byways
← Route 41	→ Route 43

Route 42 is a state highway in the U.S. state of New Jersey within the Camden area. It runs 14.28 mi (22.98 km) from an intersection with U.S. Route 322 (US 322) and County Route 536 Spur (CR 536 Spur) in Monroe Township, Gloucester County, to an intersection with Interstate 76 (I-76) and I-295 in Bellmawr, Camden County. The southern portion of Route 42 is a four-lane divided highway and one of several highways comprising the Black Horse Pike, a road that runs from Camden to Atlantic City. The northern portion is part of a six- to eight-lane freeway referred to locally as the North–South Freeway (or simply the 42 Freeway) that connects the Atlantic City Expressway to the Benjamin Franklin Bridge (via I-76 and I-676). Major junctions along the route include the Atlantic City Expressway and the southern terminus of Route 168 in Turnersville, Route 168 in Blackwood, and Route 41 and Route 55 in Deptford Township.

Route 42 was originally designated in 1927 to run along the Black Horse Pike between Ferry Avenue in Camden and the present US 40/US 322 split in the McKee City section of Hamilton Township, Atlantic County. In 1953, the southern terminus was cut back to its current terminus in the Williamstown section of Monroe Township to avoid the concurrency it shared with US 322. After the completion of the North–South Freeway between Bellmawr and Turnersville in 1959, Route 42 was moved to this freeway, and the Black Horse Pike north of Turnersville became Route 168.

The freeway portion of Route 42 has been improved many times. Construction work has commenced on a project known as the "I-295/I-76/Route 42 Direct Connection," which is reconstructing the dangerous and congested Route 42/I-295/I-76 interchange in Bellmawr.

== Route description ==
=== Black Horse Pike ===
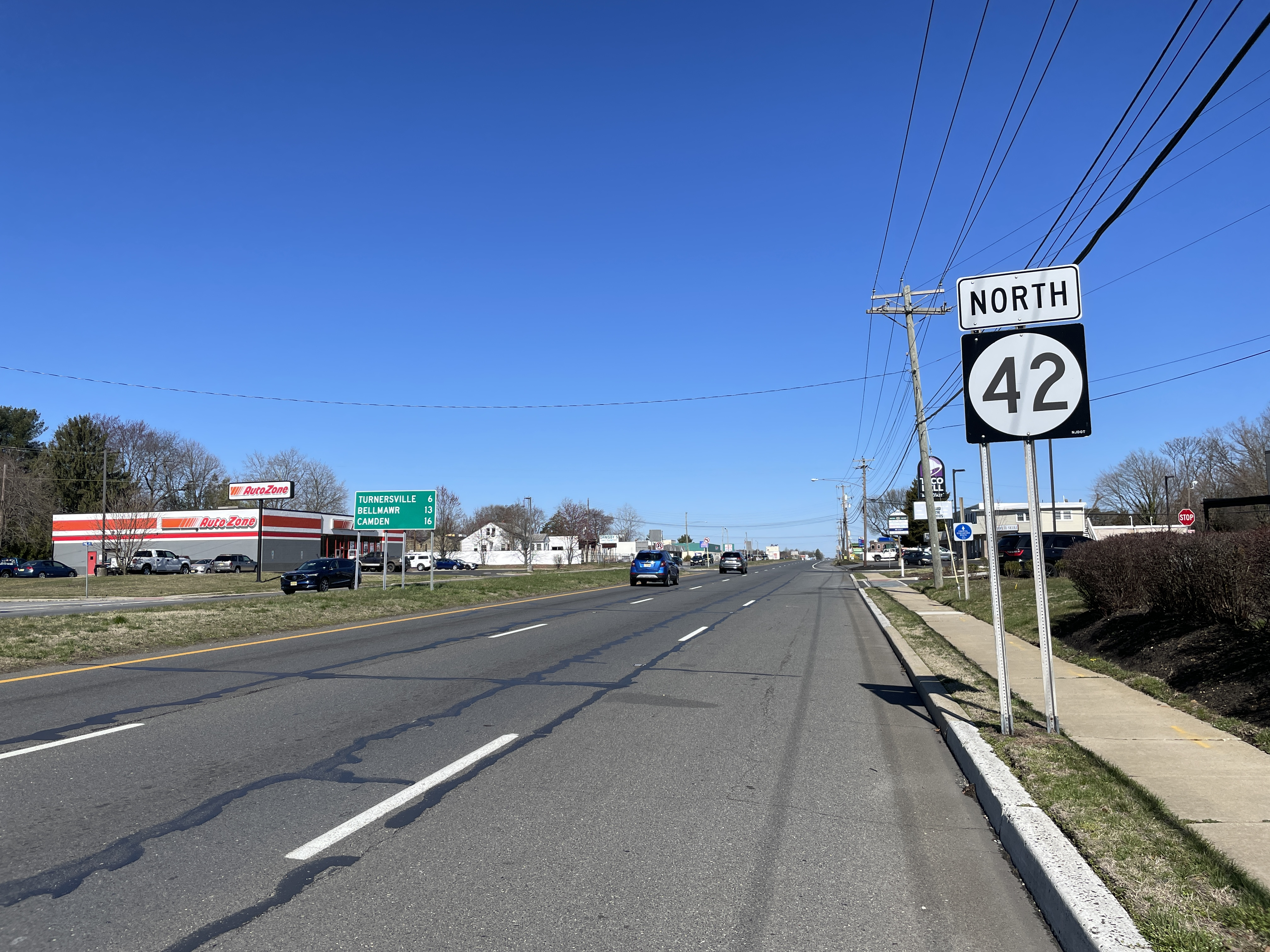
Route 42 northbound past southern terminus at US 322/CR 536 Spur in Monroe Township

Route 42 begins at an intersection with US 322 and CR 536 Spur in Monroe Township, Gloucester County, where it heads to the north on the Black Horse Pike. For the first portion of the route, Route 42 is a divided four–lane arterial highway that intersects various local roads. Some intersections along this section feature jughandles. There are also many businesses lining the highway. The route crosses CR 689 (Berlin-Cross Keys Road) and enters Washington Township. It then intersects the northern terminus of CR 555 (Tuckahoe Road). After the intersection with CR 555, Route 42 intersects three more county routes: CR 655 (Fries Mill Road), CR 639 (Ganttown Road), and CR 651 (Greentree Road). The route meets the western terminus of the Atlantic City Expressway at an interchange, Route 168 continues to the north on the Black Horse Pike, and Route 42 becomes the six–lane North–South Freeway.

=== North–South Freeway ===
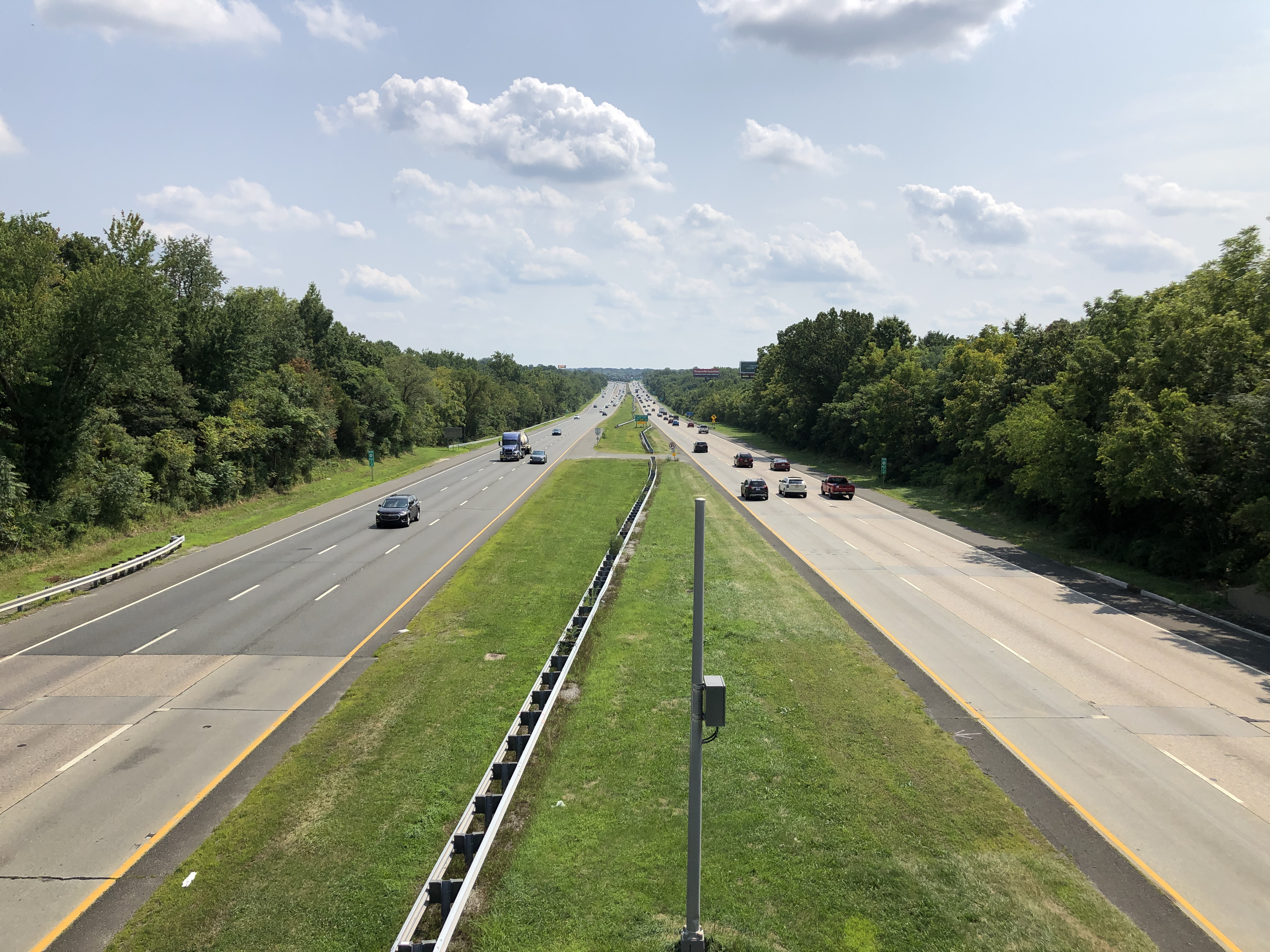
Route 42 southbound at CR 673 in Gloucester Township

Upon becoming the North–South Freeway, Route 42 crosses into Gloucester Township, Camden County and comes to the first numbered exit for CR 705, which provides access to Route 168. Following that, the freeway reaches the CR 673 (College Drive) interchange, serving Camden County College to the east and the Gloucester Premium Outlets to the west. CR 534 interchanges with a southbound exit and northbound entrance and then Coles Road interchanges with a northbound exit and southbound entrance. Next, Route 42 encounters Exits 9B and 10A for Route 168. Exit 9B serves northbound Route 168 and provides access to the New Jersey Turnpike, and Exit 10A serves southbound Route 168. After this interchange, the freeway passes over the Blackwood Railroad Trail. CR 681 interchanges after Route 168, with a southbound exit and northbound entrance, and Route 42 enters Gloucester County again in Deptford Township after crossing the South Branch of Big Timber Creek.

In Deptford Township, Route 41 interchanges with a northbound exit and an entrance in both directions. Past this interchange, CR 544 interchanges with a southbound exit and an entrance in both directions. Both of these interchanges provide access to the Deptford Mall and, in the case of the Route 41 interchange, to Route 55 from northbound Route 42 since the northbound lanes have no direct access to Route 55. Route 42 meets the northern terminus of the Route 55 freeway at Exit 13 with a southbound exit and northbound entrance, where it widens to eight lanes. Route 42 crosses the Big Timber Creek into Runnemede, Camden County, where it passes over the New Jersey Turnpike without an interchange. The freeway then enters Bellmawr, where it comes to a northbound exit to southbound I-295 and a southbound entrance from northbound I-295, before it features right-in/right-out ramps with Leaf Avenue, that provide access to CR 753 (Creek Road). Route 42 then continues north to its terminus at I-295 where the North–South Freeway becomes I-76, which heads to Camden and Philadelphia.

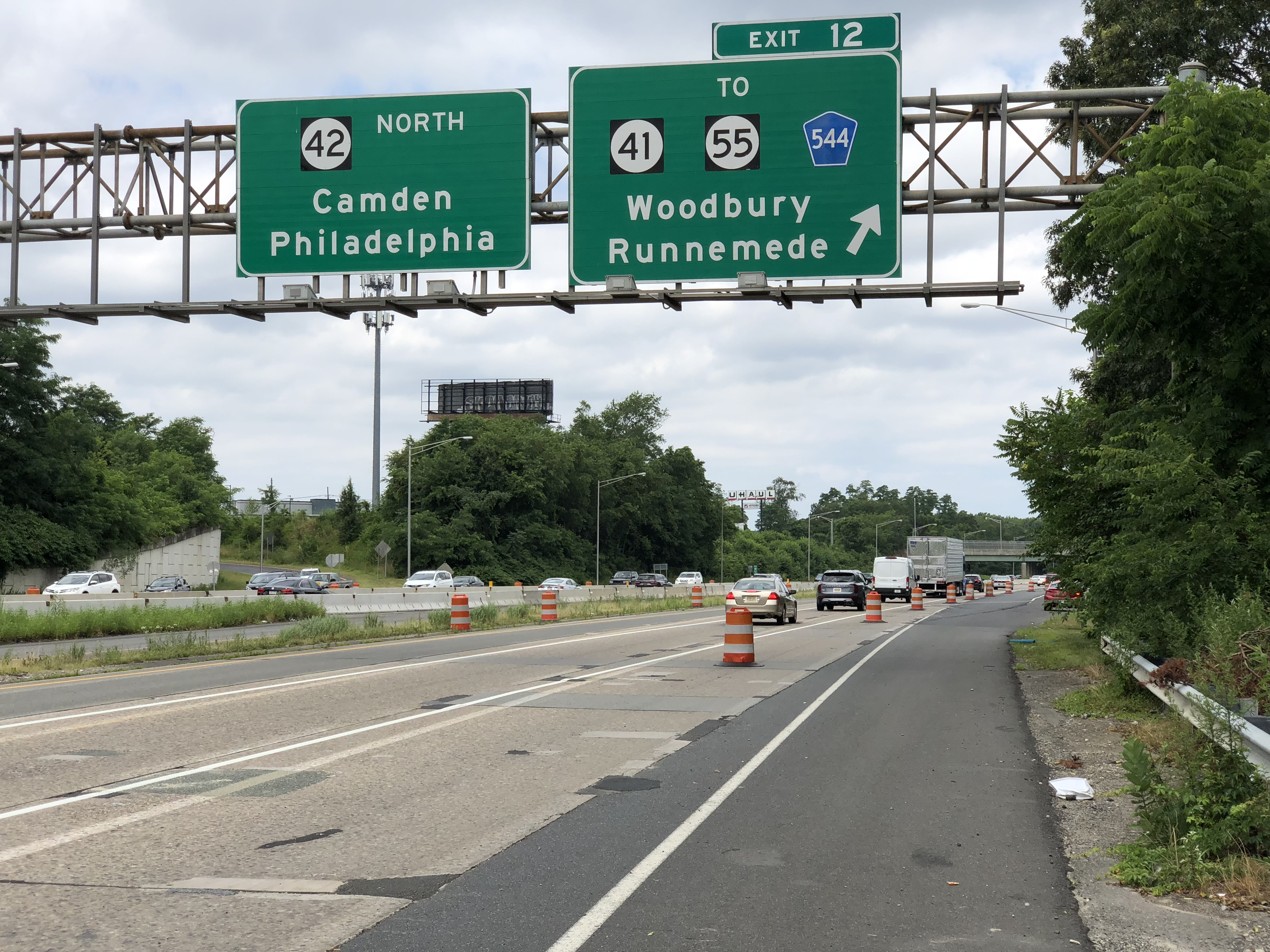
Route 42 northbound at the Route 41 interchange in Deptford Township

The North–South Freeway portion of Route 42 is a major route for daily commuters from southern New Jersey to Philadelphia, Pennsylvania, via the Walt Whitman Bridge and Ben Franklin Bridge and weekend commuters from southeastern Pennsylvania to the southern Jersey Shore via Route 55 and the Atlantic City Expressway. Even though Route 42 ends at I-295, the North–South Freeway is sometimes called "Route 42" all the way to the I-76/I-676 split.

Snow removal, litter control, and landscaping of Route 42 between the end of the Atlantic City Expressway and I-295 is performed by the South Jersey Transportation Authority.

== History ==
In 1927, Route 42 was legislated to run along the Black Horse Pike, a road that traces its origins back to 1855. In that year, the Camden and Blackwoodstown Turnpike Company was established by entrepreneurs who had helped create the White Horse Pike to build a gravel road that would run from Camden south to Blackwoodtown and eventually to Atlantic City, from Ferry Avenue in Camden to Route 48 (now US 40) in McKee City.

By 1941, US 322 was assigned to follow the routing of Route 42 between Williamstown and McKee City.

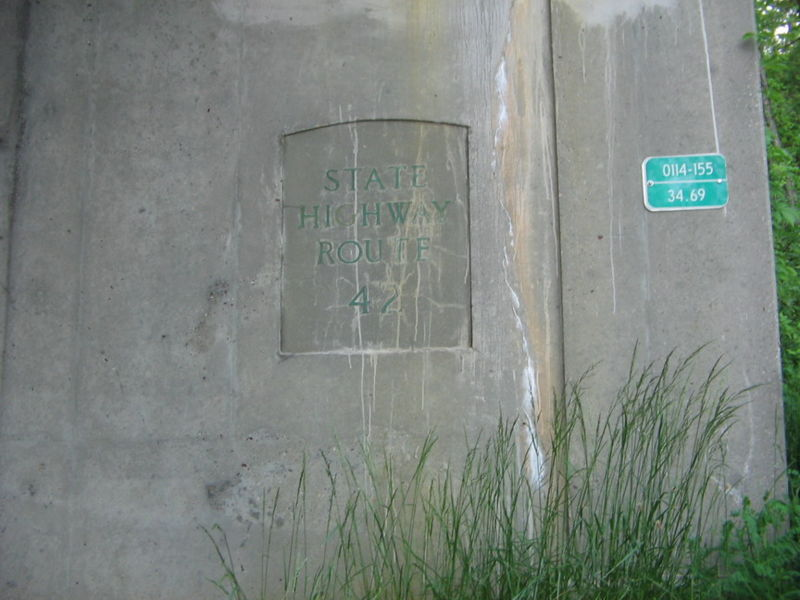
The Route 54 bridge over the Black Horse Pike (US 322) in Folsom, showing the former Route 42 designation used before the 1953 renumbering

With the 1953 New Jersey state highway renumbering, which eliminated long concurrencies between U.S. Routes and State Routes, the southern terminus of Route 42 was cut back to Williamstown to avoid the concurrency with US 322.

The North–South Freeway portion of Route 42 was originally planned as a parkway in 1932 that would run from the Ben Franklin Bridge in Camden to Atlantic City; however, this proposal never materialized. In the late 1940s, the North–South Freeway was proposed by the New Jersey State Highway Department to run from the Ben Franklin Bridge to Turnersville. In the early 1950s, right-of-way for the freeway was acquired and actual construction of the freeway followed. The Route 42 freeway opened between I-295 in Bellmawr and the Black Horse Pike in Blackwood in 1958. It opened between the Black Horse Pike in Blackwood and Turnersville in 1959. With the completion of the North–South Freeway portion of Route 42, the Black Horse Pike north of Turnersville became Route 168.

In 1965, the freeway was widened to six lanes for most of its length with the northernmost part being widened to eight lanes due to the completion of the Atlantic City Expressway and its interchange with the road.

The route had its interchange with Route 55 open in 1985, when the Route 55 Freeway was opened from Route 42 to Route 41 to the south.

Between 1996 and August 1999, the route was widened to eight lanes between I-295 and Route 55 in Deptford Township.

In 2000, the interchanges with Route 41 and CR 544 in Deptford were rebuilt at a cost of $13 million to improve commuter travel the area.

In October 2003, the New Jersey Department of Transportation (NJDOT) installed exit tabs along the freeway portion of Route 42.

On August 27, 2010, an interchange opened at CR 673 (College Drive), providing better access to Camden County College. These replaced a pair of truck pullover areas.

NJDOT had planned a project to address the missing connections between I-295 and Route 42 to provide an easier connection between the Delaware Valley and points south to Atlantic City and vice versa. This project, dubbed the I-295/Route 42 Missing Moves, would provide connections from I-295 northbound to Route 42 southbound and Route 42 northbound to I-295 southbound by constructing two ramps just south of the I-295/I-76/Route 42 interchange. Construction began in March 2020, and the ramps opened to traffic on November 28, 2023.

== Future ==
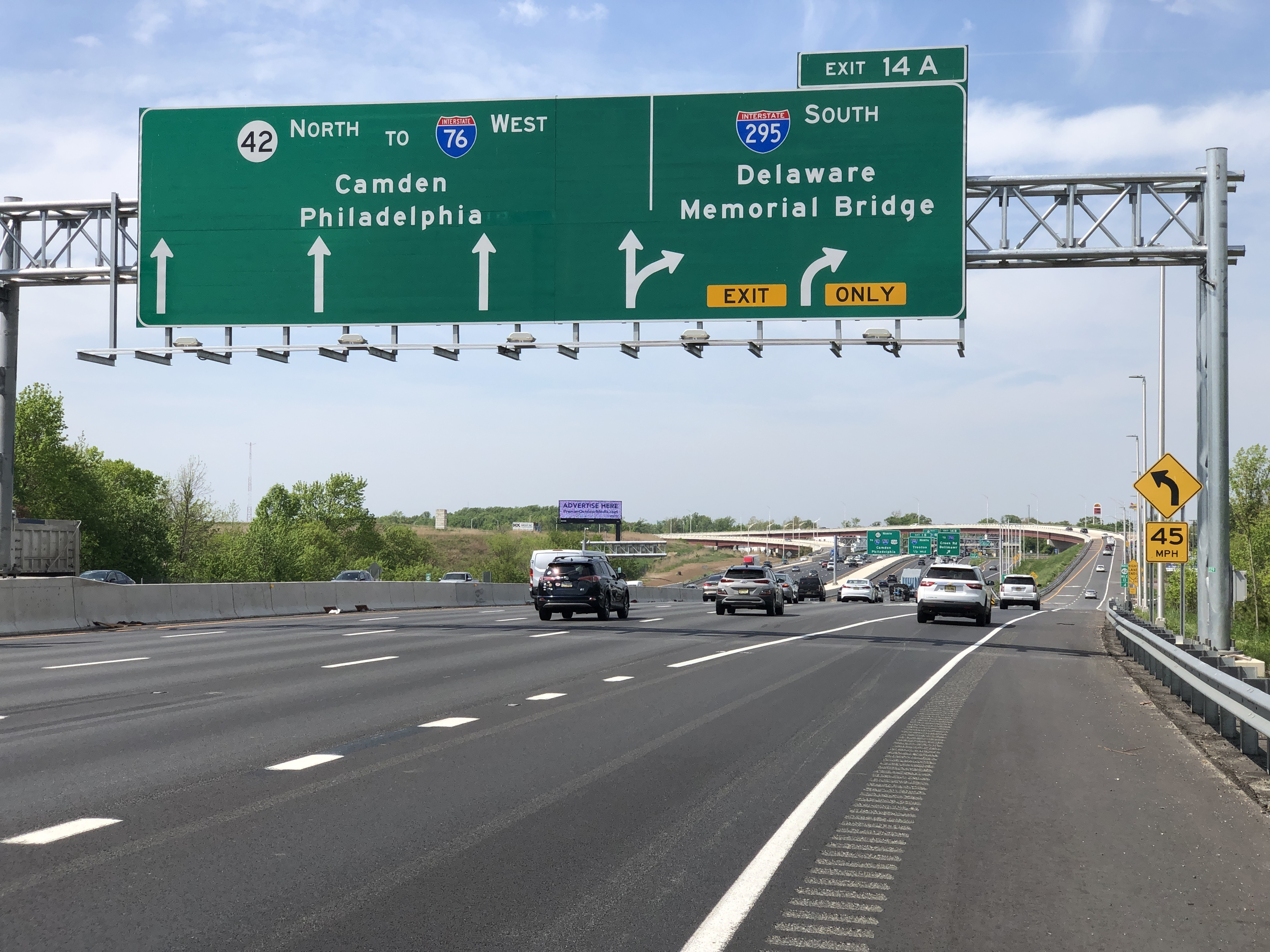
The ramp from Route 42 northbound to I-295 southbound opened in November 2023

In 2013, NJDOT broke ground on a project to construct a straighter roadway for I-295 near the Route 42 interchange. This project, dubbed the I-295/I-76/Route 42 Direct Connection, will reconstruct the dangerous and congested Route 42/I-295/I-76 interchange, which currently requires traffic on I-295 to use 35-mile-per-hour (56 km/h) ramps that merge onto the North–South Freeway for a short distance, among a series of other indirect connections. In 2007, "Alternative D" for the reconstructed interchange was selected, calling for I-295 to cross over the North–South Freeway. This interchange was projected to cost $900 million (equivalent to $1.2 billion in 2025). The project is being constructed in four phases and was originally scheduled to be complete in 2021. However, delays in construction, including the collapse of a retaining wall on March 25, 2021, pushed the expected completion date to 2028.

On May 12, 2009, New Jersey Governor Jon S. Corzine and the Delaware River Port Authority, the agency which manages the PATCO Speedline, announced plans for a Camden-Philadelphia BRT (bus rapid transit system) along the Route 42 freeway and the adjacent Route 55 freeway as part of a comprehensive transportation plan for South Jersey that would include a diesel light rail line called the Glassboro–Camden Line between Camden and Glassboro, improvements to NJ Transit's Atlantic City Line, and enhanced connections to the Atlantic City International Airport.

There have been suggestions to construct an interchange with the New Jersey Turnpike.

== Major intersections ==
County	Location	mi	km	Exit	Destinations	Notes
Gloucester	Monroe Township	0.00	0.00		US 322 (Black Horse Pike) / CR 536 Spur north (Sicklerville Road) – Glassboro, Sicklerville	Southern terminus; southern terminus of CR 536 Spur
Gloucester	Washington Township	3.51	5.65		CR 555 south (Tuckahoe Road) – Vineland	Northern terminus of CR 555
Gloucester–Camden county line	Washington–Gloucester township line	6.35	10.22	Southern end of freeway section		
Gloucester–Camden county line	Washington–Gloucester township line	6.35– 6.62	10.22– 10.65	–	A.C. Expressway east – Shore Points	Western terminus of A.C. Expressway; no southbound entrance
Gloucester–Camden county line	Washington–Gloucester township line	6.35– 6.62	10.22– 10.65	7	Route 168 north – Sicklerville	Southbound exit and entrance; southern terminus of Route 168
Gloucester–Camden county line	Washington–Gloucester township line	6.35– 6.62	10.22– 10.65	7	To Route 168 – Sicklerville, Blackwood	Northbound exit and entrance; access via CR 705
Camden	Gloucester Township	7.48	12.04	7B	CR 673 (College Drive)	
Camden	Gloucester Township	8.81	14.18	8	CR 534 – Blackwood, Pine Hill, Clementon	Southbound exit and northbound entrance
Camden	Gloucester Township	9.48	15.26	9A	Coles Road – Blenheim, Almonesson	Northbound exit and southbound entrance
Camden	Gloucester Township	10.00	16.09	9B (NB); 10A (SB)	Route 168 to N.J. Turnpike – Chews Landing, Blenheim, Almonesson	Same-directional access only
Camden	Gloucester Township	11.02	17.73	10B	CR 681 – Almonesson, Chews Landing	Southbound exit and northbound entrance
Gloucester	Deptford Township	11.54	18.57	12	Route 41 to Route 55 south / CR 544 – Woodbury, Runnemede	No southbound exit
Gloucester	Deptford Township	11.95	19.23	12	CR 544 to Route 41 – Deptford Township, Woodbury, Runnemede	Southbound exit and entrance
Gloucester	Deptford Township	12.54	20.18	13	Route 55 south – Glassboro, Vineland	Southbound exit and northbound entrance; northern terminus of Route 55
Camden	Bellmawr	13.40	21.57	14A	I-295 south – Delaware Memorial Bridge	Northbound exit and southbound entrance; exit 27A on I-295
Camden	Bellmawr	13.97	22.48	14B	CR 753 (Creek Road) – Bellmawr	Access via Edgewood/Harding Avenues; signed as exit 14 southbound
Camden	Bellmawr	14.28	22.98	1	I-295 to N.J. Turnpike – Trenton, Delaware Memorial Bridge	Signed as exits 1A (south) and 1B (north); no northbound access to I-295 south; exits 26-27 on I-295; exit nos. correspond to I-76
Camden	Bellmawr	14.28	22.98	–	I-76 west to I-676 north / US 130 – Camden, Philadelphia	Continuation west
1.000 mi = 1.609 km; 1.000 km = 0.621 mi: Electronic toll collection; Proposed; Incomplete access
