= County Route 551 (New Jersey) =

County highway in New Jersey, U.S.

County Route 551
- CR 551 highlighted in red

Route information
- Length: 34.57 mi (55.64 km)

Major junctions
- South end: Route 49 in Pennsville Township
- I-295 / Route 140 / CR 540 in Carneys Point Township; Route 48 in Carneys Point Township; US 322 in Woolwich Township; Route 45 in Woodbury; I-295 in Deptford Township; Route 47 in Westville; US 130 in Brooklawn
- North end: I-676 / US 30 in Camden

Location
- Country: United States
- State: New Jersey
- Counties: Salem, Gloucester, Camden

Highway system
- County routes in New Jersey; 500-series routes
| ← CR 550 | → CR 552 |

County Route 551 (CR 551) is a county highway in the U.S. state of New Jersey. The highway extends 34.57 miles (55.64 km) from Pennsville-Salem Road (Route 49) in Pennsville Township to Penn Street (Interstate 676 / U.S. Route 30) in Camden.

== Route description ==
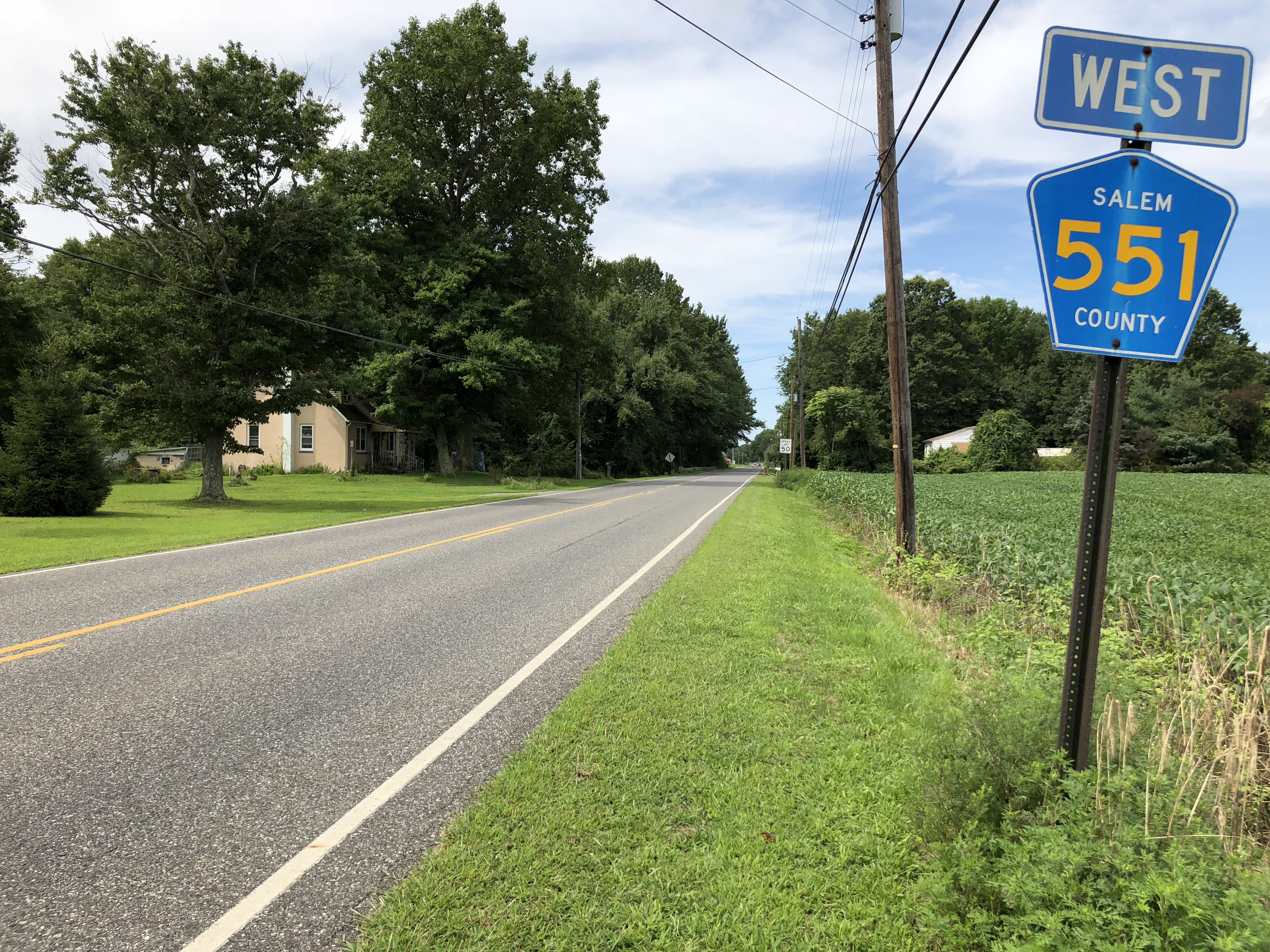
View south (signed as west) along CR 551 just southwest of CR 641 in Carneys Point Township

CR 551 begins at an intersection with Route 49 in Pennsville Township, Salem County, heading north on two-lane undivided Hook Road. The road runs through a mix of farms and woods with some homes. The route passes through some marshland adjacent to the Salem River before entering residential areas. CR 551 crosses into Carneys Point Township and comes to an interchange with I-295 at the point where the New Jersey Turnpike and US 40 split from I-295. Here, CR 551 briefly merges onto I-295 before exiting the freeway at Route 140, at which point the route heads east for a brief concurrency with Route 140 in commercial areas. CR 551 splits from Route 140 by heading northeast on two-lane undivided Auburn Road, running through forested areas a short distance to the east of I-295, intersecting CR 618. The route turns east away from I-295 and intersects CR 629 as it passes to the north of a lake before coming to a junction with Route 48. Following this intersection, the road heads into a mix of farmland and woodland with a few homes, entering Oldmans Township at the CR 641 junction. The road comes to intersections with CR 643 and CR 644 before crossing CR 602 farther east. Upon intersecting CR 646, CR 551 turns northeast onto Pointers Auburn Road and passes homes.

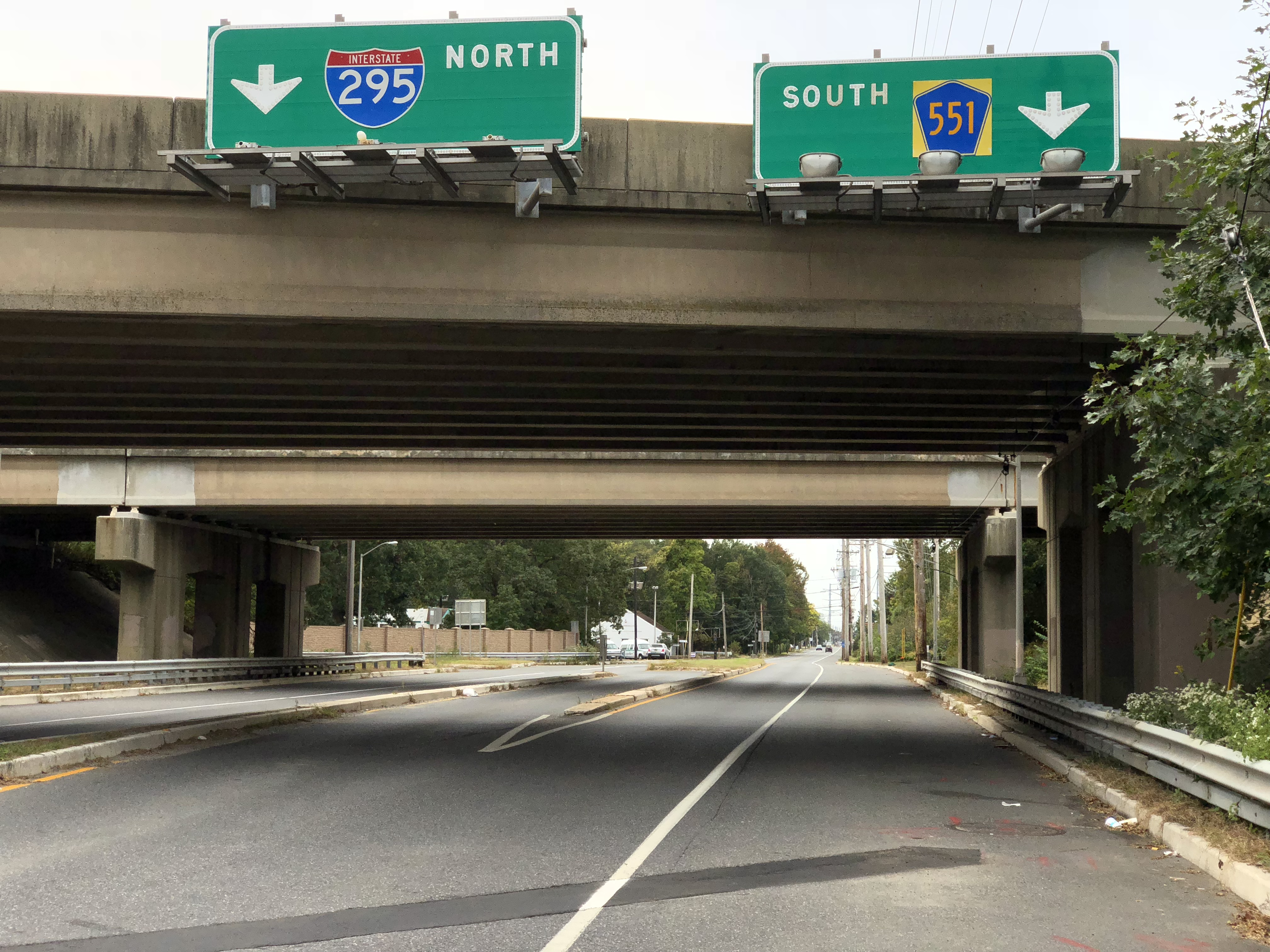
CR 551 southbound at I-295 in Deptford Township

Upon crossing the marshy Oldmans Creek, CR 551 enters Woolwich Township in Gloucester County and becomes Auburn Road as it passes residential subdivisions before crossing CR 602 and heading into agricultural areas. The road enters areas of residential development again as it intersects CR 620 and CR 662. After crossing the SMS Rail Lines' Salem Branch line, the route continues into Swedesboro and becomes Auburn Avenue. The road is lined with homes as it meets CR 671 before coming to a junction with CR 605 and CR 694. At this intersection, CR 551 turns onto Kings Highway and passes through the residential and commercial downtown of Swedesboro, reaching the junction with the western terminus of CR 538. The route crosses the Racoon Creek back into Woolwich Township and intersects CR 653 before passing a mix of farms and development as it comes to US 322/CR 536. CR 551 continues through more agricultural areas as it has junctions with CR 672 and CR 684. Continuing into East Greenwich Township, the route heads into areas of residential subdivisions as it crosses CR 607 and CR 664. After passing through some woods, the road heads into the residential community of Mickleton and intersects CR 673. In the community of Clarksboro, CR 551 reaches junctions with CR 667 and CR 707. The route crosses the Southern Railroad of New Jersey's Salem Branch before passing more homes in the community of Mount Royal, where there is an intersection with CR 678. CR 551 crosses the Mantua Creek into West Deptford Township and heads east between oil tanks to the north and residential areas to the south as it intersects CR 648, CR 643, and CR 656. The road continues near more homes and tank farms before crossing CR 660, where the setting becomes mainly residential. CR 551 enters Woodbury and becomes Salem Avenue as it enters commercial areas, crossing Conrail Shared Assets Operations' Penns Grove Secondary before reaching an intersection with Route 45.

Here, CR 551 forms a concurrency with four-lane Route 45 and heads north-northeast on Broad Street through the downtown of Woodbury. The road intersects CR 663 and continues through the downtown. Route 45 and CR 551 cross the Woodbury Creek out of the downtown area and intersect CR 644 near Inspira Health Center Woodbury. From here, the route continues past a mix of residences and businesses as a two-lane undivided road. CR 551 splits from Route 45 by heading east on Park Avenue, crossing the Conrail Shared Assets Operations' Vineland Secondary before turning north on Broadway, entering Deptford Township. The road runs through commercial areas and intersects the northern terminus of CR 553. Farther north, CR 551 reaches a partial interchange with access to and from the northbound direction of I-295; southbound access is provided by Route 45 a short distance to the west. In the area of this interchange, the route is briefly a divided highway. Past I-295, the route continues into Westville and passes through more urban areas of homes and businesses as a two-lane undivided road. CR 551 passes through the commercial downtown of Westville before joining Route 47, running northeast through commercial areas as a four-lane undivided road.

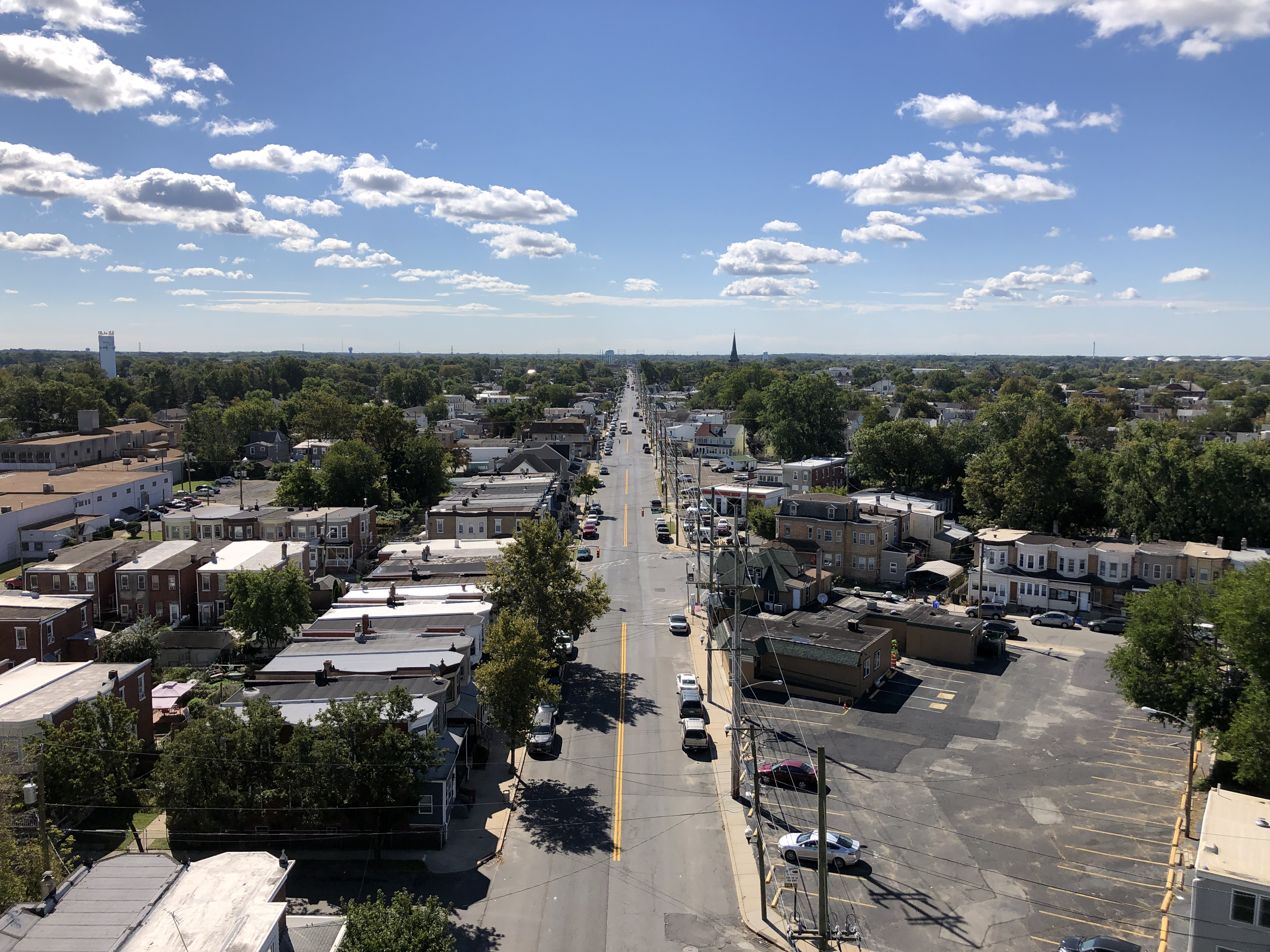
View southbound along CR 551 from the Walt Whitman Bridge in Gloucester City

After crossing the Big Timber Creek into Brooklawn, Camden County, the road comes to a traffic circle with US 130 and CR 753, where Route 47 ends and CR 551 turns west to follow US 130, passing under the Vineland Secondary. At another traffic circle, CR 551 splits from US 130 and heads northeast onto New Broadway. The road passes homes before turning north and crossing the Little Timber Creek into Gloucester City. The route continues north onto Broadway and crosses a railroad branch before passing through urban areas of homes and businesses, intersecting CR 632, CR 634, CR 635, and CR 755. CR 551 passes under the Walt Whitman Bridge, which carries I-76, before coming to a junction with CR 631 in an industrial area. The road crosses the Newton Creek into Camden and passes to the east of the Port of Camden. After passing over a railroad branch, the route passes rowhouses as it crosses CR 603. The road passes more urban development as it reaches junctions with CR 607 and CR 604. CR 551 continues north into the commercial downtown of Camden and crosses Martin Luther King Jr. Boulevard and NJ Transit's River Line at NJ Transit's Walter Rand Transportation Center and the PATCO Speedline's Broadway station. Farther north, the route intersects CR 537 and CR 537 Spur. CR 551 comes to its northern terminus at an interchange with I-676/US 30 near the toll plaza on the eastern approach of the Benjamin Franklin Bridge to Philadelphia.

== History ==
In 1681, the West Jersey legislature approved the laying out of a road from Amboy to Salem through Bordentown, Burlington, Mount Holly, Moorestown, and Haddonfield, along an old Lenape trail. It became known as a King's Highway, and was an important route of travel between the capitals of East and West Jersey. From South Amboy to Cranbury, the road followed Bordentown Avenue, Main Street, and County Route 535, then into Hightstown as Main Street. From there, the road is still known as the Old York Road to Burlington, barring a small section south of Crosswicks known as the Crosswicks-Chesterfield Road. From Mount Holly to Moorestown, the road is now known as the Marne Highway. From there to Salem, the road is still known as King's Highway, with the section surrounding Camden designated Route 41; from there to Brooklawn it's now designated CR 551 Spur, and CR 551 to Swedesboro. The road was straightened to its present course in 1812. The road had many name changes; the road west of Moorestown wasn't unified under the name "King's Highway" until 1963.

From Woodbury to Swedesboro, the road was maintained as part of the Salem and Gloucester Turnpike; the road from Swedesboro to Woodstown was also included in the turnpike.

On the evening of August 29, 2024, National Hockey League player Johnny Gaudreau and his brother Matthew were struck and killed while they were cycling on CR 551 in Oldmans Township, New Jersey.

== Major intersections ==
| County | Location | mi | km | Exit | Destinations | Notes |
|---|---|---|---|---|---|---|
| Salem | Pennsville Township | 0.00 | 0.00 | | Route 49 – Salem, Pennsville | Southern terminus |
| Salem | Carneys Point Township | 4.74 | 7.63 | Southern end of freeway section | | |
| Salem | Carneys Point Township | 4.74 | 7.63 | 1C (SB); 2A (NB) | I-295 south / US 40 west (N.J. Turnpike south) – Delaware Memorial Bridge | Southern end of I-295 concurrency |
| Salem | Carneys Point Township | 5.10 | 8.21 | 2 | I-295 north / Route 140 west / CR 540 west to US 130 – Deepwater | Signed as exits 2B (north) and 2C (west); northern end of I-295 concurrency; southern end of Route 140/CR 540 concurrency |
| Salem | Carneys Point Township | 5.10 | 8.21 | Northern end of freeway section | | |
| Salem | Carneys Point Township | 5.12 | 8.24 | | Route 140 east / CR 540 east to N.J. Turnpike north / US 40 east | Northern end of Route 140/CR 540 concurrency |
| Salem | Carneys Point Township | 7.83 | 12.60 | | Route 48 – Penns Grove, Woodstown | |
| Gloucester | Swedesboro | 16.07 | 25.86 | | CR 538 east (Glen Echo Avenue) – Franklinville, Monroeville | |
| Gloucester | Woolwich Township | 17.01 | 27.37 | | US 322 (CR 536) – Bridgeport, Mullica Hill, Atlantic City | |
| Gloucester | Woodbury | 25.90 | 41.68 | | Route 45 south – Mullica Hill | Southern end of Route 45 concurrency |
| Gloucester | Deptford Township | 27.34 | 44.00 | | Route 45 north | Northern end of Route 45 concurrency |
| Gloucester | Deptford Township | 27.52 | 44.29 | | CR 553 south – Woodbury Heights, Pitman, Glassboro | |
| Gloucester | Deptford Township | 28.08 | 45.19 | | I-295 north to I-76 west – Walt Whitman Bridge | Exit 24B on I-295 |
| Gloucester | Westville | 29.08 | 46.80 | | Route 47 south | Southern end of Route 47 concurrency |
| Camden | Brooklawn | 29.38 | 47.28 | | US 130 north / CR 551 Spur north Route 47 ends | Roundabout; southern end of US 130 concurrency; northern terminus of Route 47; southern terminus of CR 551 Spur |
| Camden | Brooklawn | 29.46 | 47.41 | | US 130 south – Westville | Roundabout; northern end of US 130 concurrency |
| Camden | Camden | 34.33 | 55.25 | | CR 537 east (Federal Street) | One-way street |
| Camden | Camden | 34.41 | 55.38 | | CR 537 Spur west (Market Street) | One-way street |
| Camden | Camden | 34.57 | 55.64 | | I-676 / US 30 | Northern terminus; exit 3 on I-676; former I-76 |
1.000 mi = 1.609 km; 1.000 km = 0.621 mi: Concurrency terminus; Incomplete access

== CR 551 Spur ==
County Route 551 Spur
- Location: Brooklawn–Haddonfield
- Length: 4.27 mi (6.87 km)

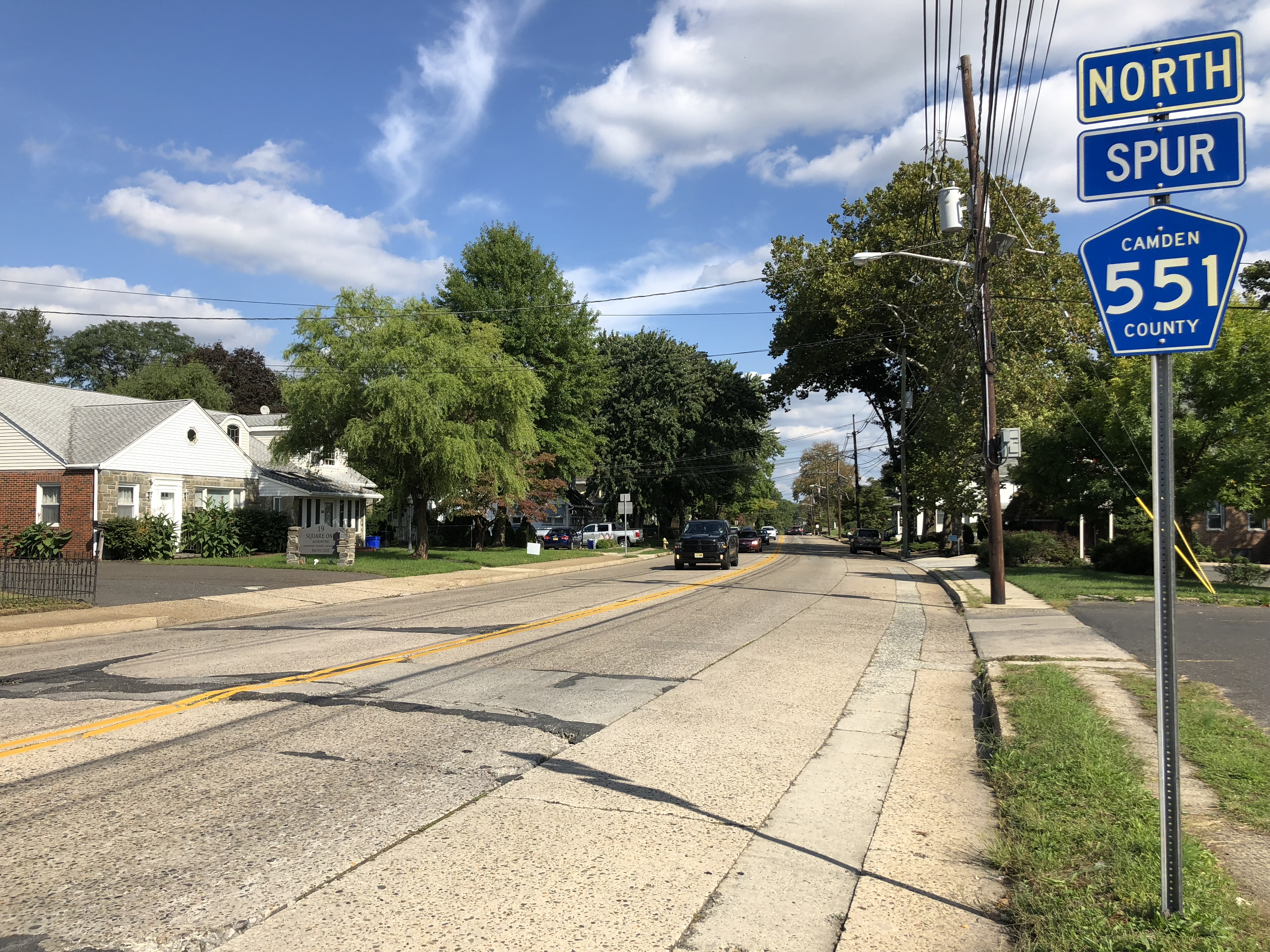
View north along CR 551 Spur at Route 168 in Mount Ephraim

County Route 551 Spur, abbreviated CR 551 Spur, is a county highway in the U.S. state of New Jersey. The highway extends 4.27 miles (6.87 km) from Broadway (U.S. Route 130) in Brooklawn to Chews Landing Road (Route 41) in Haddonfield.

The road travels through the following municipalities (from south to north):

- Bellmawr (Camden County)
- Mount Ephraim
- Haddon Heights
- Haddonfield

Major intersections
The entire route is in Camden County.

| Location | mi | km | Destinations | Notes |
|---|---|---|---|---|
| Brooklawn–Bellmawr line | 0.00 | 0.00 | US 130 / CR 551 (Crescent Boulevard) – Westville, Camden | Southern terminus |
| Mount Ephraim | 1.68 | 2.70 | Route 168 (Black Horse Pike) to N.J. Turnpike – Camden, Runnemede | |
| Audubon–Haddon Heights line | 3.12 | 5.02 | US 30 (White Horse Pike) – Berlin, Camden | |
| Haddonfield | 4.27 | 6.87 | Route 41 / CR 573 (Chews Landing Road / Kings Highway) | Northern terminus |
1.000 mi = 1.609 km; 1.000 km = 0.621 mi

Another County Route 551 Spur also existed that is currently Gloucester County Route 673.
