= New Jersey Route 41 =

Highway in New Jersey

Route 41
- Route 41 highlighted in red (Concurrency with CR 573 in pink)

Route information
- Maintained by NJDOT and Camden County
- Length: 14.08 mi (22.66 km)
- Existed: 1927–present

Major junctions
- South end: Route 47 in Deptford Township
- Route 42 in Deptford Township; Route 168 in Runnemede; US 30 in Barrington; Route 70 / Route 154 in Cherry Hill Township; Route 38 / Route 73 in Maple Shade Township
- North end: CR 611 in Maple Shade Township

Location
- Country: United States
- State: New Jersey
- Counties: Gloucester, Camden, Burlington

Highway system
- New Jersey State Highway Routes; Interstate; US; State; Scenic Byways
| ← Route 40 | → Route 42 |
| ← CR 571 | CR 573 | → CR 575 |

Route 41 is a state highway in the U.S. state of New Jersey. It runs 14.08 mi (22.66 km) from the five-way intersection of Route 47 (Delsea Drive), County Route 603 (CR 603; Fairview-Sewell Road/Blackswood-Barnsboro Road), and CR 630 (Egg Harbor Road), also known as Five Points, in Deptford Township, Gloucester County, north to the southern terminus of CR 611 in Maple Shade, Burlington County, just north of the Route 41's interchanges with Route 38 and Route 73. The route is a two- to four-lane suburban road that passes through several communities, including Runnemede, Haddonfield, and Cherry Hill Township. Between the intersection with Route 168 in Runnemede and Route 154 in Cherry Hill Township, Route 41 is maintained by Camden County and is also signed as County Route 573 (CR 573).

Route 41 was legislated in 1927 to run from Route 47 in Fairview, Deptford Township to Route 38 in Moorestown. Originally, the route was intended to bypass Haddonfield, however this bypass was never fully completed and Route 41 was signed along a temporary county-maintained alignment that also became CR 573. The northern part of this bypass was completed and became Route 154 in 1953. The road has seen many changes including the replacement of the traffic circle with Routes 38 and 73 with an interchange that involved realigning Route 41 around the original circle in 1960 and the replacement of the Ellisburg Circle at Routes 70 and 154 with a signalized intersection in the early 1990s. The temporary alignment of Route 41 along CR 573 was made permanent in the early 2000s.

== Route description ==
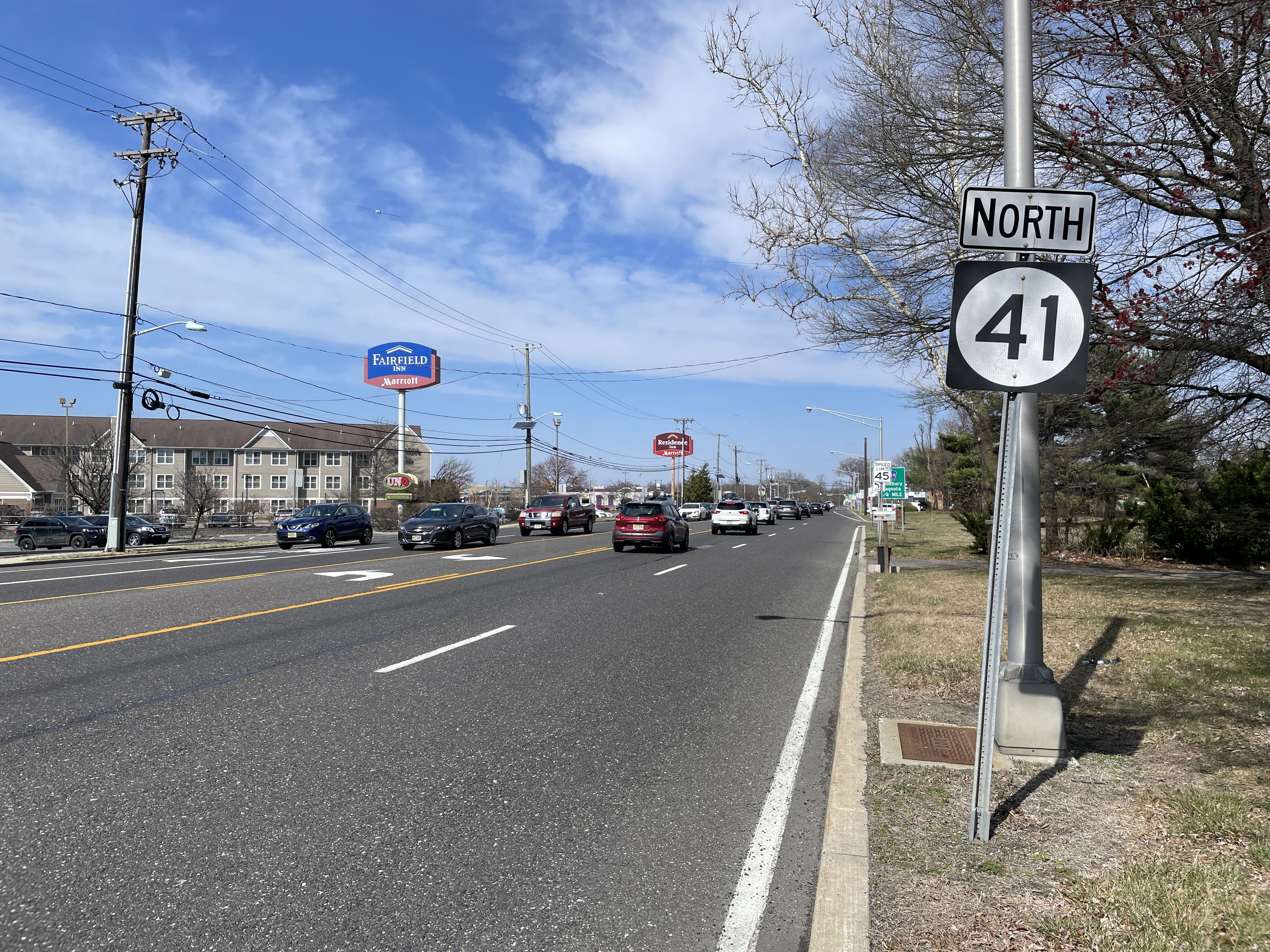
Route 41 northbound past Route 42 in Deptford Township

Route 41 heads north from the Five Points intersection with Route 47 (Delsea Drive), CR 603 (Fairview-Sewell Road/Blackswood-Barnsboro Road), and CR 630 (Egg Harbor Road) in Deptford Township, Gloucester County, on a two-lane, undivided road called Hurffville Road. The route intersects CR 621 (County House Road) and then intersects CR 534 (Good Intent Road). The route continues north and meets Deptford Center Road, which heads west and provides access to the Deptford Mall and the Route 55 freeway, and a ramp to southbound Route 42 (North–South Freeway). Route 41 comes to an interchange with the Route 42 freeway, with access provided to and from northbound Route 42. Past Route 42, Route 41 intersects CR 544 (Clements Bridge Road), with which it forms a concurrency.

County Route 573
- Location: Runnemede–Cherry Hill Township
- Length: 5.73 mi (9.22 km)

The route crosses the Big Timber Creek into Camden County, running along the border of Runnemede and Gloucester Township. CR 544 veers to the right onto Evesham Road, and Route 41 continues northeast on Clements Bridge Road into Runnemede. At the intersection with Route 168 (Black Horse Pike), Route 41 becomes county-maintained and runs concurrent with CR 573. The two routes cross into Barrington, where they pass over the New Jersey Turnpike. Upon crossing Conrail Shared Assets Operations' Beesleys Point Secondary railroad line, Route 41 and CR 573 run along the border of Barrington and Haddon Heights, with Barrington to the southeast and Haddon Heights to the northwest. The two routes pass under Interstate 295 (I-295) before meeting U.S. Route 30 (US 30, White Horse Pike) at a modified traffic circle.

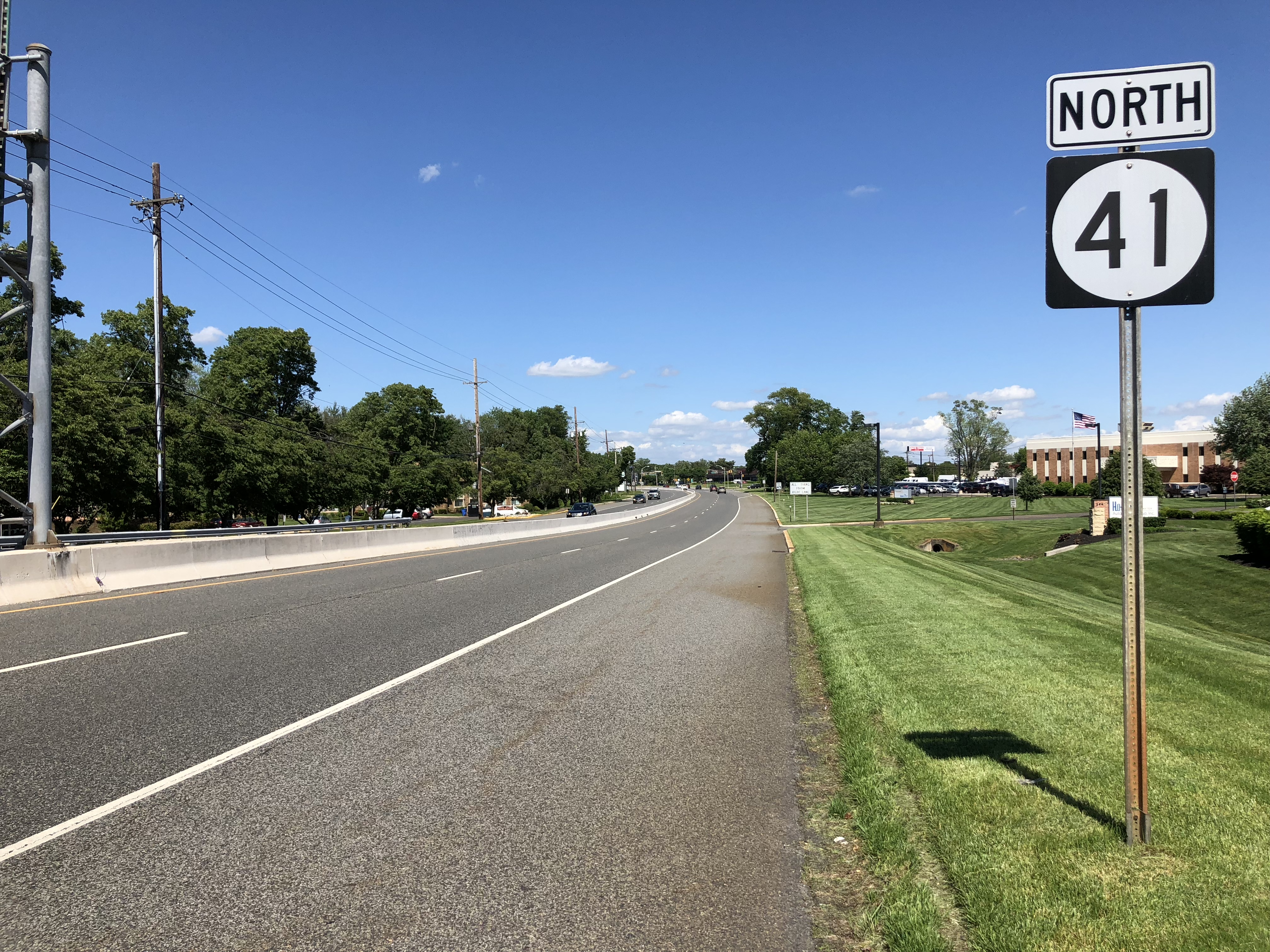
View north along Route 41 at Route 73 in Maple Shade

Route 41 and CR 573 continue north on Highland Avenue and cross into Haddonfield, where the road becomes Chews Landing Road. The two routes meet CR 551 Spur (Kings Highway), and they bear to the right onto Kings Highway, heading northeast. They pass over NJ Transit’s Atlantic City Line and the PATCO Speedline south of the Haddonfield PATCO station and then intersect CR 561 (Haddon Avenue) Past CR 561, the road crosses the Cooper River into Cherry Hill Township. Route 41 and CR 573 make a right turn onto a four-lane divided highway and intersect Route 154 (Brace Road). At this point, CR 573 ends and Route 41 makes a left turn onto a six-lane divided highway, becoming state-maintained again and forming a concurrency with Route 154.

At the point Route 41 crosses Route 70 (Marlton Turnpike), Route 154 ends and Route 41 continues to the northeast on Kings Highway, a five-lane road with a center left-turn lane. Route 41 becomes a four-lane divided highway at the crossing of the Pennsauken Creek and enters Maple Shade Township, Burlington County. The route interchanges with Route 38 and with Route 73 a short distance later. It continues to the northeast, where Route 41 ends at the end of state maintenance and Kings Highway continues northeast as CR 611.

== History ==
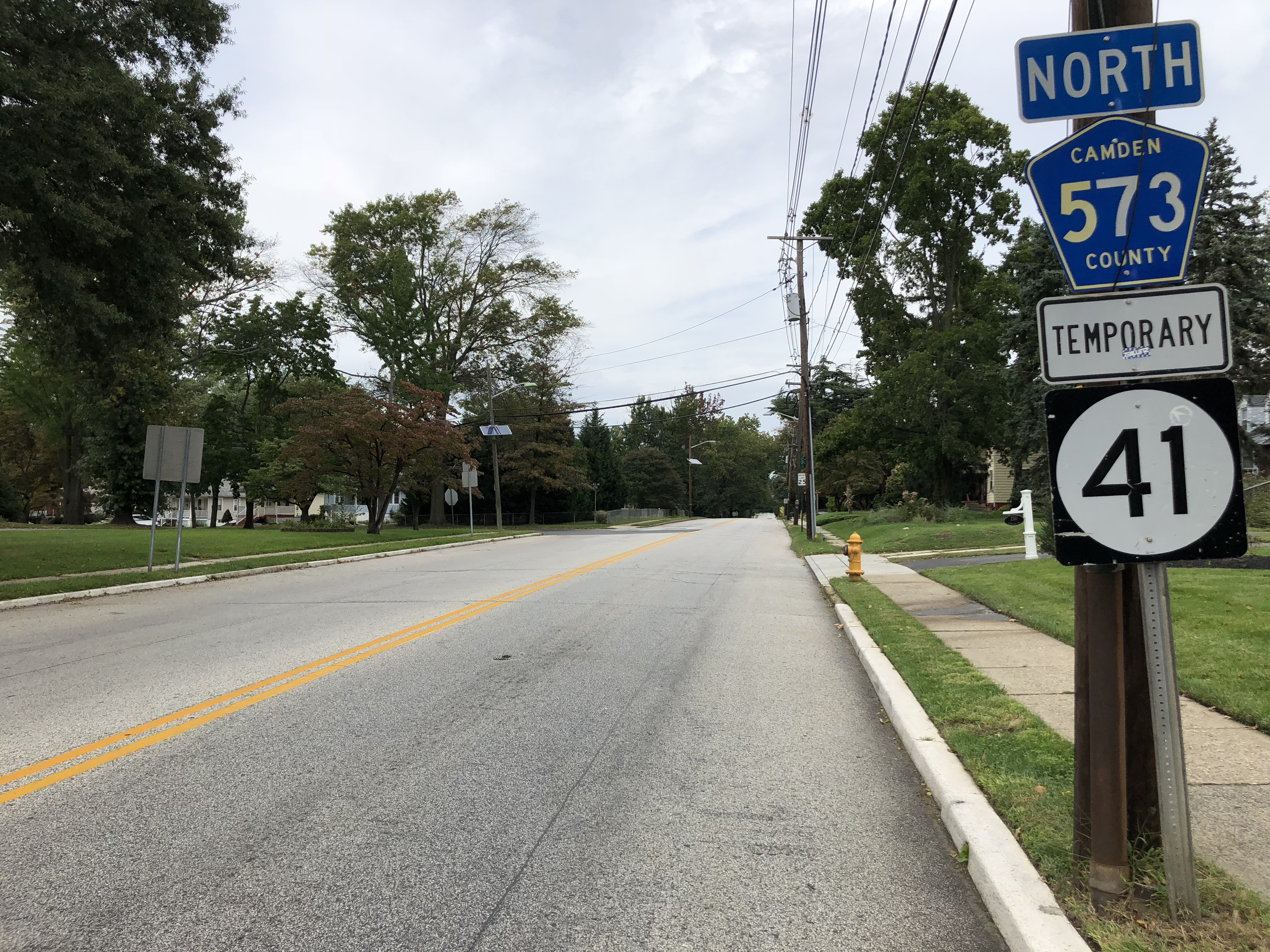
Route 41 Temporary signage with CR 573 signage at US 30 on the border of Barrington and Haddon Heights

From Moorestown to Haddonfield, the road was created as part of a King's Highway legislated in 1681 to connect South Amboy and Salem. Route 41 was legislated in 1927 to run from Route 47 in Fairview in Deptford Township to Route 38 in Moorestown along its current alignment, except through Haddonfield, which it was to bypass to the east. Also legislated in 1927 was a spur of Route 41, Route S41, which was to run from the Tacony–Palmyra Bridge to Berlin. Later spurs of Route 41 included Route S41A, which was a southern extension of Route S41 from Berlin to Route 42 (now US 322) in Folsom proposed in 1938. In the 1953 New Jersey state highway renumbering, Routes S41 and S41A became Route 73 and Route 41 was legislated along a county-maintained temporary route between Route 168 in Runnemede and Route 70 in Cherry Hill Township, signed Route 41 Temporary, when it became apparent the bypass around Haddonfield would not be fully completed. Only the northernmost section of the bypass between CR 561 and Route 70 had been built and this eventually became Route 154. The county-maintained section of Route 41 also became known as CR 573.

Since 1953, many changes have occurred along Route 41. During reconstruction of the traffic circle between Routes 38, 41, and 73 into an interchange by the 1970s, Route 41 was relocated to a new alignment that bypassed the original traffic circle and extended north a short distance on Kings Highway to just south of the CR 608 (Lenola Road) intersection in Maple Shade Township. The Ellisburg Circle at the intersection of Routes 41, 70, and 154 was reconstructed into an intersection with jughandles and traffic lights by the 1990s. This reconstruction involved realigning Route 41 to form a brief concurrency with Route 154 just south of Route 70. In the early 2000s, the Route 41 interchange with Route 42 in Deptford Township was, along with the CR 544 interchange with Route 42, reconstructed to ease traffic movements in the area. Signs for Route 41 Temporary and CR 573 still remain along this stretch of Route 41, which today is officially considered to be a part of mainline Route 41.

== Major intersections ==
| County | Location | mi | km | Destinations | Notes |
|---|---|---|---|---|---|
| Gloucester | Deptford Township | 0.00 | 0.00 | Route 47 (Delsea Drive) – Glassboro, Sewell, Westville | Southern terminus |
| Gloucester | Deptford Township | 1.80 | 2.90 | CR 534 (Good Intent Road) – Woodbury, Blackwood | |
| Gloucester | Deptford Township | 3.37 | 5.42 | Route 42 (North–South Freeway) – Atlantic City, Camden, Philadelphia | Exit 12 on Route 42 |
| Gloucester | Deptford Township | 3.86 | 6.21 | CR 544 west (Clements Bridge Road) to Route 42 north – Woodbury, Camden | Southern end of CR 544 concurrency; access to Deptford Mall |
| Camden | Runnemede | 4.17 | 6.71 | CR 544 east (Evesham Road) – Glendora, Magnolia | Northern end of CR 544 concurrency |
| Camden | Runnemede | 4.95 | 7.97 | Route 168 (Black Horse Pike) to N.J. Turnpike / A.C. Expressway – Bellmawr, Camden, Turnersville CR 573 begins | Southern terminus of CR 573 |
| Camden | Haddon Heights–Barrington line | 7.24 | 11.65 | US 30 (White Horse Pike) to I-295 | Modified roundabout |
| Camden | Haddonfield | 8.55 | 13.76 | CR 551 Spur south (Kings Highway) | Northern terminus of CR 551 Spur |
| Camden | Haddonfield | 9.12 | 14.68 | CR 561 (Haddon Avenue) | |
| Camden | Cherry Hill Township | 10.68 | 17.19 | Route 154 south (Brace Road) CR 573 ends | Southern end of Route 154 concurrency; northern terminus of CR 573 |
| Camden | Cherry Hill Township | 10.83 | 17.43 | Route 70 (Marlton Turnpike) Route 154 ends | Northern terminus of Route 154; former Ellisburg Circle |
| Burlington | Maple Shade Township | 13.37 | 21.52 | Route 38 / Route 73 south – Camden, Ben Franklin Bridge, Moorestown, Mount Holly | Interchange; no northbound access to Route 38 west; Route 73 not signed northbound |
| Burlington | Maple Shade Township | 13.60 | 21.89 | Route 73 to N.J. Turnpike – Marlton, Palmyra, Tacony Bridge | Interchange; no southbound access to Route 73 south; no northbound entrance |
| Burlington | Maple Shade Township | 14.08 | 22.66 | CR 611 north (Kings Highway) | Continuation north |
1.000 mi = 1.609 km; 1.000 km = 0.621 mi: Concurrency terminus; Incomplete access
