= County Route 557 (New Jersey) =

Highway in New Jersey, United States

County Route 557
- CR 557 highlighted in red, Truck Alternate in pink

Route information
- Length: 36.00 mi (57.94 km)
- Tourist routes: Pine Barrens Byway

Major junctions
- South end: Route 47 in Dennis Township
- CR 550 in Woodbine; Route 49 in Upper Township; Route 50 in Estell Manor; CR 552 in Buena Vista Township; CR 540 in Buena Vista Township; US 40 / Route 54 in Buena Vista Township
- North end: CR 555 in Franklin Township

Location
- Country: United States
- State: New Jersey
- Counties: Cape May, Atlantic, Gloucester

Highway system
- County routes in New Jersey; 500-series routes
← CR 555	→ CR 559

County Route 557 (CR 557) is a county highway in the U.S. state of New Jersey. The highway extends 36.00 miles (57.94 km) from Delsea Drive (Route 47) in Dennis Township to Main Street (CR 555) in Franklin Township. It is also referred to as Tuckahoe Road.

== Route description ==
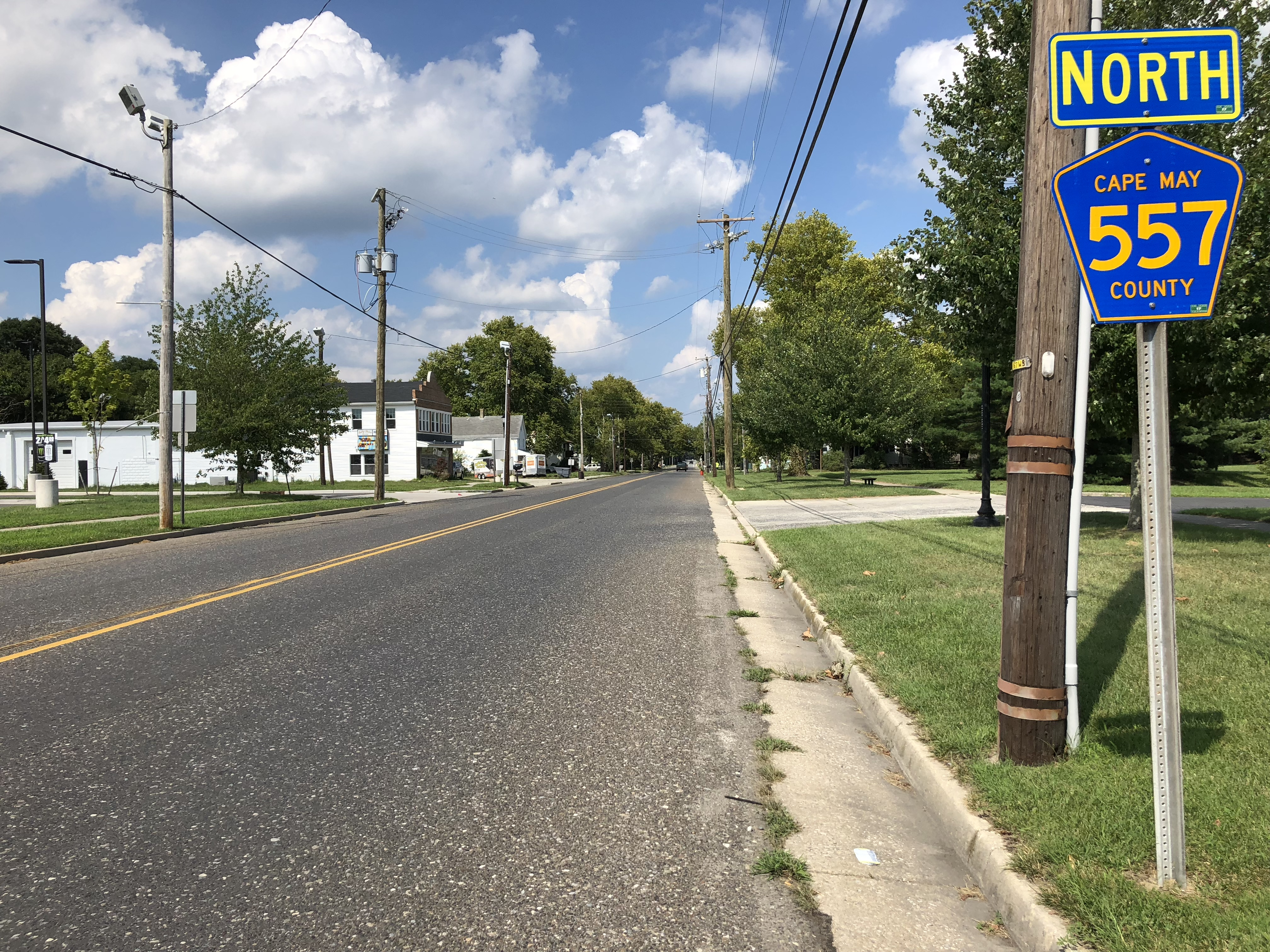
View north along CR 557 at CR 550 in Woodbine

CR 557 begins at an intersection with Route 47 in Dennis Township, Cape May County, heading northeast on two-lane undivided Washington Avenue into forested areas. The route crosses into Woodbine and enters residential areas, intersecting CR 611 and CR 550/CR 638. At the intersection with the latter, CR 557 forms a concurrency with CR 550 and the two routes pass a mix of homes and businesses as it comes to Dehirsch Avenue, where CR 550 splits from CR 557 by heading southeast on that road. From this point, CR 557 continues north into Upper Township and becomes North Dennis-Marshallville Road as it continues into forested areas with occasional homes. Farther north, the route intersects CR 617 and turns east onto Mill Road, heading into residential areas in the community of Tuckahoe. The road crosses the Cape May Seashore Lines railroad line south of the Tuckahoe station, the Beesleys Point Secondary railroad line operated by the Cape May Seashore Lines railroad, and CR 659 within a short distance of each other before reaching a junction with Route 50 and CR 664. CR 557 forms a concurrency with Route 50 and the two routes head north through residential and commercial areas and encounter the eastern terminus of Route 49 before leaving Tuckahoe.

Not far after Route 49, the road crosses the Tuckahoe River into Corbin City, Atlantic County. In Corbin City, it heads into residential areas, with CR 611 looping to the west of the route. Route 50 and CR 557 continue northwest and intersect CR 648, where the road turns north into more forested areas. At the junction with CR 645, the route turns to the northeast and enters Estell Manor, becoming Broad Street. CR 557 splits from Route 50 by heading northwest on Tuckahoe Road into dense forests. The road comes to a bridge over the Beesleys Point Secondary and begins running immediately to the west of the railroad line, heading into wooded areas of homes as it crosses CR 637, with CR 557 Truck heading east along that route. Farther north, CR 557 enters Weymouth Township, where it crosses CR 669 before intersecting CR 666. The road continues into Buena Vista Township and crosses CR 552, at which point the railroad line begins to head farther east from the road. CR 557 continues through woodland with some farms and homes as it comes to the CR 540 junction. The road continues through more farmland and woodland as it reaches intersections with CR 681 and CR 671. CR 557 turns north onto Cumberland Road briefly before reaching an intersection with US 40 in commercial areas. At this point, CR 557 Truck joins CR 557 again and CR 557 turns northwest to run along US 40. The road comes to the southern terminus of Route 54 and the eastern end of CR 619, at which point it enters Buena. The road runs through the commercial center of town and crosses the Southern Railroad of New Jersey's Southern Running Track line before heading into inhabited areas. Upon splitting from US 40 at the CR 672 junction, CR 557 heads north into Franklin Township, Gloucester County on Tuckahoe Road, passing through forested areas of homes. CR 557 reaches its northern terminus at an intersection with CR 555 and CR 659, where Tuckahoe Road continues north as part of CR 555.

== History ==
The road from Tuckahoe to Woodbine was part of the Cape May Way, an auto trail running from Camden to Cape May.

== Major intersections ==
County	Location	mi	km	Destinations	Notes
Cape May	Dennis Township	0.00	0.00	Route 47 (Delsea Drive) – Wildwood, Millville	Southern terminus
Cape May	Woodbine	3.10	4.99	CR 550 west (Belleplain Fidler Road)	South end of CR 550 overlap
Cape May	Woodbine	3.51	5.65	CR 550 east (Dehirsch Avenue) – Ocean View, Sea Isle City	North end of CR 550 overlap
Cape May	Upper Township	9.42	15.16	Route 50 south to G.S. Parkway – Seaville, Ocean City, Cape May	South end of Route 50 overlap
Cape May	Upper Township	9.56	15.39	Route 49 west to Route 55 – Millville, Vineland	
Atlantic	Estell Manor	12.75	20.52	Route 50 / CR 557 Truck north – Mays Landing	North end of Route 50 overlap
Atlantic	Buena Vista Township	21.54	34.67	CR 552 (Cumberland Avenue) – Millville, Mays Landing	
Atlantic	Buena Vista Township	24.98	40.20	CR 540 (Landis Avenue/Cedar Avenue) – Vineland, Richland, Atlantic City	
Atlantic	Buena Vista Township	27.73	44.63	US 40 east / CR 557 Truck south (Harding Highway) – Mays Landing	South end of US 40 overlap
Atlantic	Buena Vista Township–Buena line	27.86	44.84	Route 54 north (Blue Anchor Road) to A.C. Expressway – Hammonton	
Gloucester	Franklin Township	30.32	48.80	US 40 west (Harding Highway)	North end of US 40 overlap
Gloucester	Franklin Township	36.00	57.94	CR 555 (Main Street) – Cross Keys	Northern terminus
1.000 mi = 1.609 km; 1.000 km = 0.621 mi: Concurrency terminus

== CR 557 Truck ==
County Route 557 Truck
- Location: Estell Manor–Buena Vista Township
- Length: 19.62 mi (31.58 km)

County Route 557 Truck is a 19.62 miles (31.58 km) truck bypass of a portion of County Route 557 between Estell Manor and Buena Vista Township in Atlantic County. The 19.62 mi (31.58 km) route follows Route 50 and U.S. Route 40. This routing bypasses a now-rebuilt bridge over the Beesleys Point Secondary on CR 557 in Estell Manor that had a weight restriction.

Major intersections
The entire route is in Atlantic County.

Location	mi	km	Destinations	Notes
Estell Manor	0.00	0.00	CR 557 north (Tuckahoe Road) / Route 50 south – Cape May, Buena	Southern terminus, south end of Route 50 overlap
Hamilton Township	8.53	13.73	US 40 east / Route 50 north / CR 559 Truck south (Harding Highway) to CR 559 – Egg Harbor	North end of Route 50 overlap, south end of US 40/CR 559 Truck overlap
Hamilton Township	9.30	14.97	CR 559 Truck north / CR 606 east (Old Harding Highway)	North end of CR 559 Truck overlap
Hamilton Township	9.71	15.63	CR 552 west (Millville Road) – Milmay, Vineland, Millville	
Buena Vista Township	16.69	26.86	CR 540 west (Cedar Avenue) – Vineland, Salem	
Buena Vista Township	19.62	31.58	US 40 west / CR 557 (Harding Highway/Cumberland Road) – Tuckahoe, Cape May	Northern terminus, north end of US 40 overlap
1.000 mi = 1.609 km; 1.000 km = 0.621 mi: Concurrency terminus
