= List of county routes in Cumberland County, New Jersey =

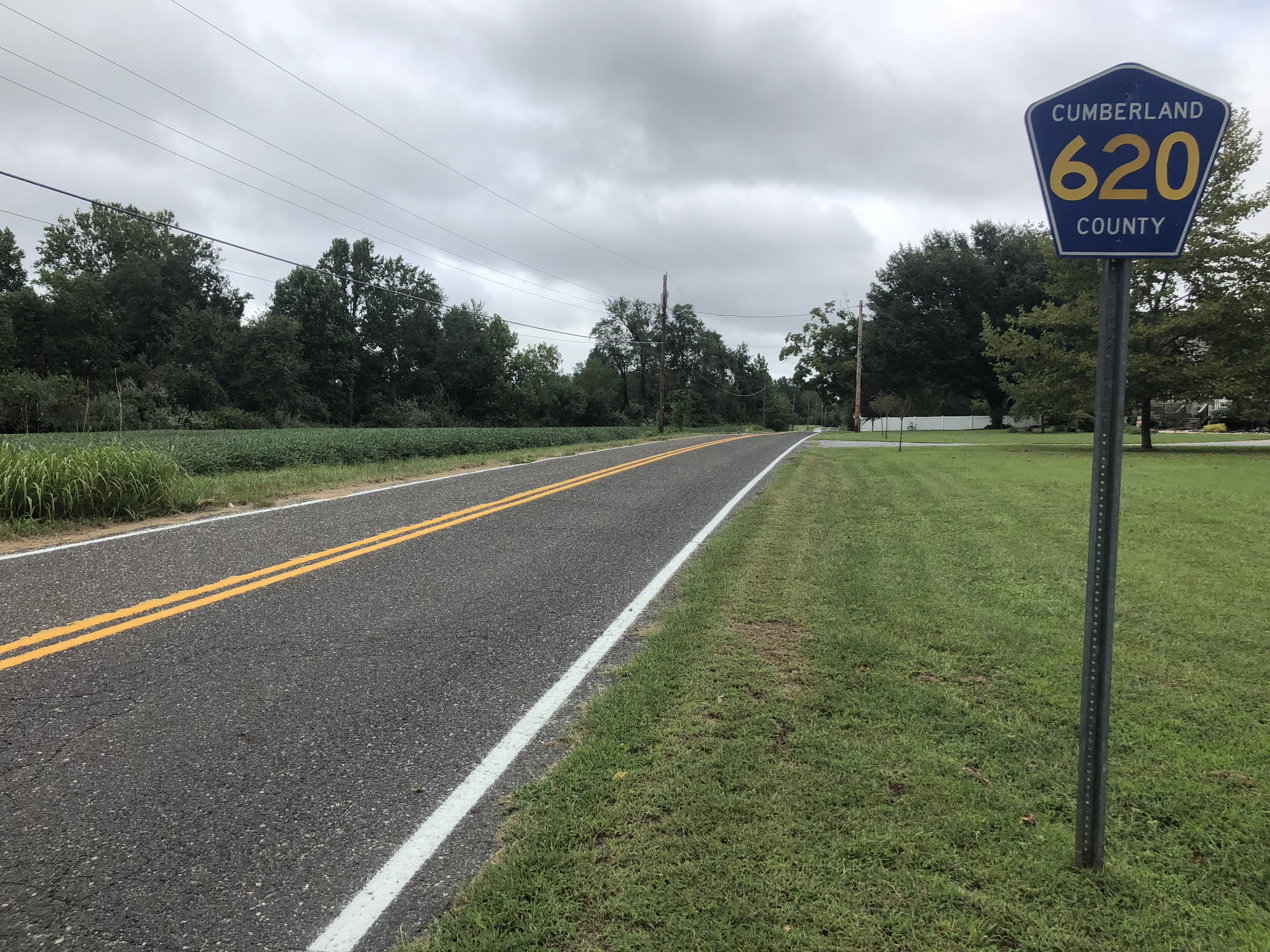
CR 620 in Greenwich Township

The following is a list of county routes in Cumberland County in the U.S. state of New Jersey. For more information on the county route system in New Jersey as a whole, including its history, see County routes in New Jersey.

== 500-series county routes ==
In addition to those listed below, the following 500-series county routes serve Cumberland County:

- CR 540, CR 548, CR 550, CR 550 Spur, CR 552, CR 552 Spur, CR 553, CR 555

== Other county routes ==
Route	Length (mi)	Length (km)	From	Via	To	Notes
CR 601	5.68	9.14	End of the county maintenance in Fairfield Township	Back Neck Road	Main Street (CR 553) in Fairfield Township	Formerly designated as CR 1.
CR 602	4.28	6.89	Hospital Road (CR 703) in Greenwich Township	Macanippuck Road, Buckhorn Road	Marlboro Road (CR 647) in Stow Creek Township	
CR 603	1.36	2.19	Columbia Highway (CR 617) in Hopewell Township	Harmony Road	Walters Road (CR 689) in Hopewell Township	
CR 604	3.06	4.92	Chestnut Road (CR 623) and Canton Road (CR 623) in Stow Creek Township	Gum Tree Corner Road, Stow Creek Road	Roadstown Road (CR 626) in Stow Creek Township	
CR 605	2.78	4.47	Finley Road (CR 617) in Upper Deerfield Township	Richards Road	Parvins Mill Road (CR 645) in Deerfield Township	
CR 606	4.95	7.97	Irving Avenue (CR 552) in Bridgeton	Laurel Street, Old Deerfield Pike	Parsonage Road (CR 630) and Old Deerfield Pike (CR 630) in Upper Deerfield Township	
CR 607	10.17	16.37	Ye Greate Street (CR 623) in Greenwich Township	Bridgeton Road, Greenwich Road, South West Avenue, North West Avenue, Beebe Run Road	Minches Corner Road (CR 719) in Hopewell Township	
CR 608	4.01	6.45	Sherman Avenue (CR 552) in Deerfield Township	Carmel Road	West Broad Street (Route 49) and Beech Street (CR 698) in Millville	
CR 609	2.94	4.73	Fairton–Gouldtown Road (CR 553) in Fairfield Township	Bridgeton–Fairton Road, South Avenue, Grove Street, South Pearl Street	East Broad Street (Route 49) and North Pearl Street (Route 77) in Bridgeton	Formerly designated as CR 9.
CR 610	11.59	18.65	Bay Point Road in Lawrence Township	Jones Island Road, Maple Avenue, Cedarville Road, Cedar Street, Brandriff Avenue	West Main Street (Route 49) in Millville	Formerly designated as CR 10.
CR 611	1.98	3.19	Rosenhayn Avenue (CR 659) in Upper Deerfield Township	South Burlington Road, Centerton Road	Finley Road (CR 617) in Upper Deerfield	
CR 612	4.31	6.94	Finley Road (CR 617) in Upper Deerfield Township	Seeley Road, Polk Lane	Deerfield Road (CR 540) in Upper Deerfield Township	
CR 613	1.01	1.63	Trench Road (CR 699) in Hopewell Township	Cumberland Drive	Greenwich Road (CR 607) in Hopewell Township	
CR 614	3.99	6.42	Main Street (CR 553) in Downe Township	Dragston Road, Dragstown Road, James Moore Road	North Avenue (CR 649) in Commercial Township	Formerly designated as CR 14.
CR 615	6.61	10.64	Sherman Avenue (CR 552) in Vineland	South East Boulevard, South West Boulevard, North East Boulevard, North West Boulevard	West Boulevard (CR 615) at the Gloucester County line in Vineland	
CR 616	7.51	12.09	Delsea Drive (Route 47) in Maurice River Township	Glade Road, Main Street, High Street	Delsea Drive (Route 47) in Maurice River Township	
CR 617	6.18	9.95	Shiloh Pike (Route 49) in Stow Creek Township	Columbia Highway, Seeley–Finley Road, Finley Road	Centerton Road (CR 553)/CR 611) and East Finley Road (CR 553) in Upper Deerfield Township	
CR 618	1.43	2.30	Roadstown Road (CR 626) in Hopewell Township	Bowentown Road	Greenwich Road (CR 607) in Hopewell Township	
CR 619	3.92	6.31	Dead end in Vineland	West Wheat Road, East Wheat Road	Wheat Road (CR 619) at the Atlantic County line in Vineland	Formerly designated as CR 83.
CR 620	4.61	7.42	Ye Greate Street (CR 623) in Greenwich Township	Springtown Road, Roadstown–Greenwich Road, Shiloh Road, Roadstown–Shiloh Road	Shiloh Pike (Route 49) in Shiloh	Formerly designated as CR 20.
CR 621	2.77	4.46	Old Deerfield Pike CR 606 in Upper Deerfield Township	West Park Drive	Roadstown Road (CR 626) in Hopewell Township	Formerly designated as CR 21.
CR 622	1.17	1.88	Old Deerfield Pike (CR 606) in Upper Deerfield Township	Cornwell Drive	Landis Avenue (Route 56) and North Pearl Street (Route 77) in Upper Deerfield Township	
CR 623	6.83	10.99	Dead end in Greenwich Township	Ye Greate Street, Chestnut Road, Canton Road	Main Street (CR 623) at the Salem County border in Stow Creek Township	
CR 624	4.46	7.18	Roadstown Road (CR 626) in Stow Creek Township	Jericho Road, Moores Corner Road	Harmony Road (CR 603) in Hopewell Township	
CR 625	3.63	5.84	Cedarville Road (CR 610) in Lawrence Township	Hogbin Road	West Main Street (Route 49) in Millville	Formerly designated as CR 125.
CR 626	6.65	10.70	Jericho Road (CR 626) at the Salem County line in Stow Creek Township	Jericho Road, Roadstown Road	South West Avenue (CR 607) in Bridgeton	
CR 627	2.62	4.22	Buckshutem Road (CR 670) in Millville	Silver Run Road	Silver Run Road (CR 555) and Dividing Creek Road (CR 555) in Millville	
CR 628	5.89	9.48	Delsea Drive (Route 47) in Vineland	College Drive, Oak Road, Orchard Road	West Wheat Road (CR 619) in Vineland	Formerly designated as CR 84.
CR 629	4.38	7.05	Baptist Road (CR 656) in Downe Township	Back Road, Newport–Centre Grove Road	Cedarville Road (CR 610) in Lawrence Township	
CR 630	2.81	4.52	Finley Road (CR 617) in Upper Deerfield Township	Foster Road, Parsonage Road, Old Deerfield Pike	Route 77 in Upper Deerfield Township	
CR 631			End of maintenance in Commercial Township	Shell Road, High Street	Yock Wock Road (CR 727) in Commercial Township	Formerly designated as CR 31; decommissioned
CR 632			End of maintenance in Commercial Township	Hands Landing Road, Ogden Avenue	Main Street (CR 553 / CR 678) in Commercial Township	Formerly designated as CR 32; decommissioned
CR 633	2.75	4.43	North Avenue (CR 649) and Mauricetown Bypass (CR 649) in Commercial Township	North Avenue, Steep Run Road	Buckshutem Road (CR 670) in Commercial Township	
CR 634	6.14	9.88	West Main Street (Route 49) in Millville	Nabb Avenue, Morton Avenue	Parvins Mill Road (CR 645) in Deerfield Township	Formerly designated as CR 34.
CR 635	2.79	4.49	Shiloh Pike (Route 49) on the Hopewell/Stow Creek township line	Old Cohansey Road	Aldine Road (CR 635) at the Salem County line on the Hopewell/Stow Creek township line	Formerly designated as CR 35.
CR 636	1.44	2.32	Sherman Avenue (CR 552) in Deerfield Township	Jesse Bridge Road	Gershel Avenue at the Salem County line in Deerfield Township	
CR 637	4.48	7.21	New Jersey Avenue in Downe Township	Downe Avenue, Fortescue Road	Landing Road (CR 656) in Downe Township	Formerly designated as CR 37.
CR 638	4.39	7.07	Fairton–Millville Road (CR 698) in Fairfield Township	South Burlington Road, North Burlington Road	Rosenhayn Avenue (CR 659) in Bridgeton	Formerly designated as CR 38.
CR 639	3.69	5.94	Bacons Neck Road (CR 642) in Greenwich Township	Gum Tree Corner Road	Chestnut Road (CR 623), Gum Tree Corner Road (CR 604), and Canton Road (CR 623) in Stow Creek Township	
CR 640	2.00	3.22	Friesburg–Deerfield Road (CR 640) at the Salem County line in Hopewell Township	Friesburg Road	Route 77 in Upper Deerfield Township	
CR 641	0.67	1.08	Pier Road (CR 741) in Greenwich Township	Market Lane	Ye Greate Street (CR 623) in Greenwich Township	
CR 642	7.64	12.30	Ye Greate Street (CR 623) in Greenwich Township	Bacons Neck Road, Tindall Island Road, Wheaton Island Road, Stathems Neck Road	Hospital Road (CR 703) in Greenwich Township	
CR 643	4.43	7.13	Bayview Road and Nantuxent Drive in Downe Township	Money Island Road, Newport Neck Road	Fortescue Road (CR 637) in Downe Township	Formerly designated as CR 43.
CR 644	5.59	9.00	Port Elizabeth–Cumberland Road (CR 646) in Maurice River Township	Hesstown Road	13th Avenue at the Atlantic County line in Maurice River Township	Formerly designated as CR 46.
CR 645	3.05	4.91	Landis Avenue (Route 56) in Upper Deerfield Township	Parvins Mill Road	Morton Avenue (CR 634) in Deerfield Township	
CR 646	4.86	7.82	Delsea Drive (Route 47) in Maurice River Township	Port Elizabeth–Cumberland Road	Route 49 in Maurice River Township	
CR 647	6.01	9.67	Chestnut Road (CR 623) in Stow Creek Township	Willis Road, Marlboro Road	Marlboro Road (CR 647) at the Salem County line in Stow Creek Township	
CR 648	2.89	4.65	Dead end in Lawrence Township	Sayers Neck Road	Cedarville Road (CR 553) in Fairfield Township	
CR 649	4.47	7.19	Main Street (CR 553) in Commercial Township	North Avenue, Mauricetown Bypass	Buckshutem Road (CR 670) and Mauricetown Road (CR 670/CR 744) in Commercial Township	Formerly designated as CR 33 and a former section of CR 548.
CR 650	8.13	13.08	Ye Greate Street (CR 623) in Greenwich Township	Sheppards Mill Road, Dutch Neck Road, Fayette Street	West Broad Street (Route 49) in Bridgeton	
CR 651	2.59	4.17	Delsea Drive (Route 47) in Maurice River Township	Hands Mill Road	Hands Mill Road (CR 550 Spur) and Mosslander Road (CR 550 Spur/CR 679) in Maurice River Township	
CR 652	1.43	2.30	Dead end in Lawrence Township	Sheppard Davis Road	Main Street (CR 553) in Lawrence Township	
CR 653	1.78	2.86	Sayers Neck Road (CR 648) in Lawrence Township	Bowers Creek Road, Mulford Avenue, Iron Bridge Road	Jones Island Road (CR 610) and Maple Avenue (CR 610) in Lawrence Township	
CR 654	5.66	9.11	Sherman Avenue (CR 552) in Upper Deerfield Township	Lebanon Road	Jesse Bridge Road (CR 636) in Deerfield Township	Formerly designated as CR 54.
CR 655	6.08	9.78	South Main Road (CR 555) in Vineland	Lincoln Avenue	Lincoln Avenue (CR 655) at the Atlantic County line in Vineland	Formerly designated as CR 25.
CR 656	3.13	5.04	Dead end in Downe Township	Landing Road, Baptist Road	Main Street (CR 553) and Newport-Centre Grove Road (CR 629) in Lawrence Township	Formerly designated as CR 56.
CR 657	3.83	6.16	Sayers Neck Road (CR 648) in Fairfield Township	Husted Bateman Road, Rockville Road	Main Street (CR 553) and Cedarville Road (CR 553) in Fairfield Township	
CR 658	4.39	7.07	Route 77 in Upper Deerfield Township	Big Oak Road	Big Oak Road at the Salem County line in Deerfield Township	
CR 659	7.90	12.71	Laurel Street (CR 606) and Old Deerfield Pike (CR 606) in Bridgeton	Bridgeton Avenue, Rosenhayn Avenue, Vineland Avenue, Stillman Avenue	Lebanon Road (CR 654) in Deerfield Township	Formerly designated as CR 59.
CR 660	2.65	4.26	Canton Road (CR 623) in Stow Creek Township	Landing Road, Stow Creek Road	Stow Creek Road (CR 604) and Gum Tree Corner Road (CR 604) in Stow Creek Township	
CR 661	6.45	10.38	River Road in Hopewell Township	Barretts Run Road	Moores Corner Road (CR 624) in Hopewell Township	
CR 662	0.84	1.35	Old Deerfield Pike (CR 606) in Upper Deerfield Township	Laurel Heights Drive	Cornwell Drive (CR 622) in Upper Deerfield Township	
CR 663	2.87	4.62	Old Deerfield Pike (CR 630) in Upper Deerfield Township	Center Road	Canhouse Road (CR 663) at the Salem County line in Upper Deerfield Township	
CR 664	2.07	3.33	Main Street (CR 553) in Downe Township	Hickman Avenue, Turkey Point Road	Main Street (CR 553) in Downe Township	Formerly designated as CR 64.
CR 665	0.76	1.22	North Pearl Street (Route 77) in Bridgeton	Penn Street, Indian Avenue	North Burlington Road (CR 638) in Bridgeton	
CR 666	3.06	4.92	Rosenhayn Avenue (CR 659) and Vineland Avenue (CR 659) in Deerfield Township	Bridgeton Avenue	Stillman Avenue (CR 659) in Deerfield Township	
CR 667	1.65	2.66	West Main Street (Route 49) in Millville	Sharp Street	High Street in Millville	
CR 668	0.88	1.42	South Avenue (CR 609) in Bridgeton	Pamphylia Avenue	South Burlington Road (CR 638) in Bridgeton	Formerly designated as CR 68.
CR 669	0.88	1.42	East Commerce Street (Route 49) in Bridgeton	Manheim Avenue	Indian Avenue (CR 665) in Bridgeton,	
CR 670	18.19	29.27	North Pearl Street (Route 77) in Bridgeton	East Commerce Street, Buckshutem Road, Mauricetown Road, Mauricetown–Crossway Road	Route 47 and Route 347 in Commercial Township	Formerly designated as CR 70.
CR 671	6.95	11.18	East Main Street (Route 49) in Maurice River Township	Union Road	Union Road (CR 671) at the Atlantic County line in Vineland	
CR 672	2.93	4.72	Lincoln Avenue (CR 655) in Vineland	Brewster Road, North Brewster Road	North Brewster Road (CR 672) at the Atlantic County line in Vineland	Formerly designated as CR 85.
CR 673	5.06	8.14	Broad Street (CR 552 Spur) in Millville	Hance Bridge Road	Panther Road in Vineland	
CR 674	4.15	6.68	Garden Road (CR 674) at the Salem County line in Vineland	West Garden Road, East Garden Road	Garden Road at the Gloucester County line in Vineland	Formerly designated as CR 74.
CR 675	2.38	3.83	Fairton–Gouldtown Road (CR 553), Gouldtown–Woodruff Road (CR 553), and Buckshutem Road (CR 670) in Fairfield Township	Fairton–Gouldtown Road, Fordville Road, Reeves Road, East Avenue	Irving Avenue (CR 552) in Deerfield Township	
CR 676	6.14	9.88	Main Street (CR 553) in Downe Township	Haleyville Road, Highland Street	Buckshutem Road (CR 744) in Commercial Township	
CR 677	3.65	5.87	Big Oak Road (CR 658) in Upper Deerfield Township	Burlington Road, Old Burlington Road	Burlington Road (CR 677) at the Salem County line in Upper Deerfield Township	
CR 678	2.00	3.22	East Main Street (Route 49) in Millville	North Wade Boulevard	Wheaton Avenue (CR 555) in Millville	
CR 679	1.42	2.29	Mosslander Road (CR 550 Spur) and Hands Mill Road (CR 550 Spur/CR 651) in Maurice River Township	Mosslander Road	Route 347 in Maurice River Township	
CR 680			Main Street (CR 553) in Commercial Township	Strawberry Avenue	James Moore Avenue (CR 614) in Commercial Township	Formerly designated as CR 80; decommissioned
CR 681	5.97	9.61	Maurice River Parkway in Vineland	West Oak Road, East Oak Road	Oak Road (CR 681) at the Atlantic County line in Vineland	Formerly designated as CR 84.
CR 682	1.64	2.64	West Main Street (Route 49) in Millville	Sugarman Avenue	Sherman Avenue (CR 552) in Deerfield Township	Formerly designated as CR 75.
CR 683	0.54	0.87	Newcombtown Road (CR 684) and Leamings Mill Road (CR 684) in Millville	Crest Avenue	Broad Street (CR 552 Spur) in Millville	
CR 684	2.34	3.77	North Wade Boulevard (CR 678) in Millville	Newcombtown Road, Leamings Mill Road	Dead end in Vineland	
CR 686	2.24	3.60	Rosenhayn Avenue (CR 659) in Deerfield Township	Garton Road	Big Oak Road (CR 658) in Deerfield Township	
CR 687	4.17	6.71	Landis Avenue (Route 56), Woodruff Road ((CR 553), and South Woodruff Road (CR 553) in Upper Deerfield Township	Woodruff Road, Husted Station Road	Greenville Road at the Salem County line in Upper Deerfield Township	
CR 689	2.78	4.47	Old Cohansey Road (CR 635) on the Hopewell/Stow Creek township line	Walters Road, Harmony Road	Center Road (CR 663) in Upper Deerfield Township	Formerly designated as CR 89.
CR 690	2.92	4.70	Willow Grove Road (CR 639) at the Salem County line in Vineland	Weymouth Road, West Weymouth Road, East Weymouth Road	Weymouth Road at the Gloucester County line in Vineland	Formerly designated as CR 49.
CR 692	6.23	10.03	Main Street (CR 553) in Fairfield Township	Ramah Road	Cedarville Road (CR 610) in Lawrence Township	
CR 693	1.14	1.83	Silver Lake Road (CR 704) in Hopewell Township	Holding Road	Columbia Highway (CR 617) in Hopewell Township	
CR 694	1.44	2.32	Barretts Run Road (CR 661) on the Hopewell Township/Shiloh border	Shoemaker Road	Beebe Run Road (CR 607) in Hopewell Township	
CR 695	1.72	2.77	Roadstown Road (CR 626) in Hopewell Township	Randolph Road, Maple Avenue	East Avenue (CR 753) in Shiloh	
CR 696	1.53	2.46	Roadstown Road (CR 626) in Hopewell Township	Diament Road, South Avenue	Roadstown-Shiloh Road (CR 620) and West Avenue (CR 753) in Shiloh	
CR 697	1.51	2.43	Fayette Street (CR 650) in Bridgeton	Vine Street, Atlantic Street, Mayor Aitken Drive	West Park Drive (CR 621) in Bridgeton	
CR 698	8.68	13.97	Main Street (CR 553) and Bridgeton-Fairton Road (CR 553) in Fairfield Township	Fairton–Millville Road, Fairton Road, Beech Street	West Main Street (Route 49) and Carmel Road (CR 608) in Millville	
CR 699	3.44	5.54	Sheppards Mill Road (CR 650) in Hopewell Township	Trench Road	Dutch Neck Road (CR 650) in Hopewell Township	
CR 700	0.35	0.56	Main Street (CR 553) in Downe Township	Old Beaver Dam Road	Dead end in Downe Township	
CR 701	1.26	2.03	Stathems Neck Road (CR 642) in Greenwich Township	Davis Mill Road	Willis Road (CR 647) in Stow Creek Township	
CR 702	0.22	0.35	Main Street (CR 553) in Downe Township	Old Beaver Dam Road	Dead end in Downe Township	
CR 703	3.89	6.26	Tindall Island Road (CR 642) and Wheaton Island Road (CR 642) in Greenwich Township	Old Mill Road, Ye Greate Street, Mill Road	Roadstown-Greenwich Road (CR 620) on the Hopewell/Stow Creek township line	
CR 704	3.24	5.21	Beebe Run Road (CR 607) in Hopewell Township	Silver Lake Road	Finley Road (CR 617) in Upper Deerfield Township	
CR 705	2.30	3.70	Irving Avenue (CR 552) in Deerfield Township	Rogers Avenue, Woodruff–Carmel Road, Carmel Road	South Woodruff Road (CR 553) in Upper Deerfield Township	
CR 706	1.88	3.03	Bridgeton–Fairton Road (CR 609) and South Avenue (CR 609) in Fairfield Township	Shoemaker Road	Fairton–Gouldtown Road (CR 553) in Fairfield Township	
CR 707	0.57	0.92	Broad Street (CR 552 Spur) in Millville	Hance Bridge Road	North Wade Boulevard (CR 678) in Millville	
CR 708	3.15	5.07	Highland Street (CR 676) in Commercial Township	James Pettit Road, Spring Garden Road	Buckshutem Road (CR 670) in Commercial Township	
CR 709	0.57	0.92	Main Street (CR 616) in Maurice River Township	Carlisle Place Road	Delsea Drive (Route 47) in Maurice River Township	
CR 710	0.96	1.54	High Street (CR 616) in Maurice River Township	Station Road	Delsea Drive (Route 47) in Maurice River Township	
CR 711	2.23	3.59	Route 77 in Upper Deerfield Township	Northville Road	Deerfield Road (CR 540) in Upper Deerfield Township	
CR 712	1.46	2.35	Cedarville Road (CR 610) in Millville	Rieck Avenue	West Main Street (Route 49) in Millville	Formerly designated as CR 112.
CR 714	1.75	2.82	West Main Street (Route 49) in Millville	Morias Avenue	Carmel Road (CR 608) in Millville	
CR 715	0.62	1.00	Centerton Road (CR 553) in Upper Deerfield Township	Pindale Drive	Pindale Drive at the Salem County line in Deerfield Township	
CR 717	3.29	5.29	Sherman Avenue (CR 552) in Deerfield Township	Kenyon Avenue	Landis Avenue (Route 56) on the Deerfield/Pittsgrove township line	Formerly designated as CR 117.
CR 718	3.94	6.34	Narrow Lane Road (CR 555) in Downe Township	Ackley Road	Buckshutem Road (CR 670) in Commercial Township	
CR 719	1.98	3.19	Sewall Road in Hopewell Township	Minches Corner Road	Columbia Highway (CR 617) in Hopewell Township	
CR 720	2.52	4.06	North Burlington Road (CR 638) in Bridgeton	Reeves Road	Reeves Road (CR 675) and East Avenue (CR 675) in Fairfield Township	
CR 721	1.16	1.87	Walters Road (CR 689) in Hopewell Township	Harmony Road	Beals Mill Road at the Salem County line in Hopewell Township	
CR 722	2.34	3.77	Fairton–Gouldtown Road (CR 553) in Fairfield Township	Clarks Pond Road, South East Avenue	West Broad Street (Route 49) in Bridgeton	Formerly designated as CR 122.
CR 723	2.58	4.15	John Dare Road (CR 726) in Hopewell Township	Seeley–Cohansey Road	Beals Mill Road (CR 733) in Hopewell Township	
CR 724	0.62	1.00	Seeley Road (CR 612) in Upper Deerfield Township	Cake Road	Harmony Road (CR 689) in Upper Deerfield Township	
CR 725	1.03	1.66	Main Street (CR 553) in Commercial Township	Dragston Road	Dragston Road (CR 614) and Dragstown Road (CR 614) in Downe Township	Formerly designated as CR 14.
CR 726	0.74	1.19	Harmony Road (CR 603) in Hopewell Township	John Dare Road	Columbia Highway (CR 617) in Hopewell Township	
CR 727			Strawberry Avenue (CR 680) in Commercial Township	Yock Wock Road	North Avenue (CR 649) in Commercial Township	Formerly designated as CR 80; decommissioned
CR 728	0.73	1.17	Steep Run Road (CR 633) in Commercial Township	Ferry Road	Buckshutem Road (CR 670) in Commercial Township	
CR 729	1.53	2.46	Northville Road (CR 711) in Upper Deerfield Township	Weber Road	Husted Station Road (CR 687) in Upper Deerfield Township	
CR 730	1.04	1.67	Tice Lane at the Salem County line in Upper Deerfield Township	Tice Lane	Route 77 in Upper Deerfield Township	
CR 731	0.56	0.90	South West Avenue (CR 607) in Bridgeton	West Commerce Street, East Commerce Street	North Pearl Street (Route 77) in Bridgeton	
CR 732	0.90	1.45	Fortescue Road (CR 637) in Downe Township	Hall Road, Methodist Road	Main Street (CR 553) in Downe Township	
CR 733	1.19	1.92	Marshall Road at the Salem County line in Hopewell Township	Beals Mill Road	Friesburg Road (CR 640) in Upper Deerfield Township	
CR 734	0.73	1.17	Fortescue Road (CR 637) in Downe Township	Cabin Ridge Road	Newport Neck Road (CR 643) in Downe Township	
CR 735	0.52	0.84	Greenman Avenue (CR 737) in Deerfield Township	North Shiloh Avenue	Morton Avenue (CR 634) in Deerfield Township	
CR 736	1.03	1.66	Maurice River Road in Maurice River Township	Matt Landing Road	Main Street (CR 616) in Maurice River Township	
CR 737	0.65	1.05	Vineland Avenue (CR 659) in Deerfield Township	Greenman Avenue	Landis Avenue (Route 56) in Deerfield Township	
CR 738	0.09	0.14	Hopewell Township border in Bridgeton	Mary Elmer Drive	North West Avenue (CR 607) and Beebe Run Road (CR 607) in Bridgeton	
CR 739	0.43	0.69	Delsea Drive (Route 47) in Maurice River Township	High Street	High Street (CR 616) and Main Street (CR 616) in Maurice River Township	
CR 740	0.41	0.66	Delsea Drive (Route 47) in Maurice River Township	Mackeys Lane	High Street (CR 616) in Maurice River Township	
CR 741	0.37	0.60	Bacons Neck Road (CR 642) in Greenwich Township	Pier Road	Market Lane (CR 641) in Greenwich Township	
CR 742	0.11	0.18	Route 77 in Upper Deerfield Township	Northwest Avenue	Centerton Road (CR 611) in Upper Deerfield Township	
CR 743	0.87	1.40	Old Deerfield Pike (CR 606) in Upper Deerfield Township	Parsonage Road	Route 77 in Upper Deerfield Township	
CR 744	1.78	2.86	Mauricetown Bypass (CR 649) in Commercial Township	Noble Street, Front Street	Mauricetown Bypass (CR 649), Buckshutem Road (CR 670), and Mauricetown Road (CR 670) in Commercial Township	
CR 747	0.12	0.19	Almond Road (CR 540) and Quigley Avenue (CR 540) in Vineland	Almond Road	Delsea Drive (Route 47) in Vineland	
CR 748	0.17	0.27	Main Street (CR 616) in Maurice River Township	Ward Avenue	Station Road (CR 710) in Maurice River Township	
CR 753	2.12	3.41	Marlboro Road (CR 647) in Stow Creek Township	West Road, West Avenue, East Avenue	Barretts Run Road (CR 661) on the Stow Creek Township/Shiloh border	
CR 754	0.53	0.85	Lebanon Road (CR 654) in Deerfield Township	Tuska Road	Tuska Road at the Salem County line in Deerfield Township	
CR 755	0.18	0.29	South Main Road (CR 555) in Vineland	Burns Avenue	Lincoln Avenue (CR 655) in Vineland	
CR 760	0.06	0.10	Grove Street (CR 609) in Bridgeton	Henry Street	South Avenue (CR 609) in Bridgeton	
CR 761	0.07	0.11	Grove Street (CR 609) in Bridgeton	Eagle Street	South Avenue (CR 609) in Bridgeton	
CR 762	0.06	0.10	Grove Street (CR 609) in Bridgeton	River Street	South Avenue (CR 609) in Bridgeton	
CR 763	0.05	0.08	Grove Street (CR 609) in Bridgeton	Garfield Avenue	South Avenue (CR 609) in Bridgeton	
CR 764	0.05	0.08	Grove Street (CR 609) in Bridgeton	Cedardell Avenue	South Avenue (CR 609) in Bridgeton	
CR 765	0.13	0.21	Grove Street (CR 609) in Bridgeton	Baltimore Avenue	South Avenue (CR 609) in Bridgeton	
CR 766	0.12	0.19	Grove Street (CR 609) in Bridgeton	Morris Avenue	South Avenue (CR 609) in Bridgeton	
CR 767	2.84	4.57	Narrow Lane Road (CR 555) and Dividing Creek Road (CR 555) in Commercial Township	Battle Lane	Buckshutem Road (CR 670) in Commercial Township	
