= UMH =

UMH may refer to:

- Miguel Hernández University of Elche, a Spanish university, located in the province of Alicante
- Underwood-Memorial Hospital, a hospital in Woodbury, New Jersey, USA
- The United Methodist Hymnal
- University of Mons-Hainaut, a university in the French Community of Belgium
- UMH group, an international multimedia group based in Ukraine
