= Milmay, New Jersey =

Populated place in Atlantic County, New Jersey, US

- Census-designated place
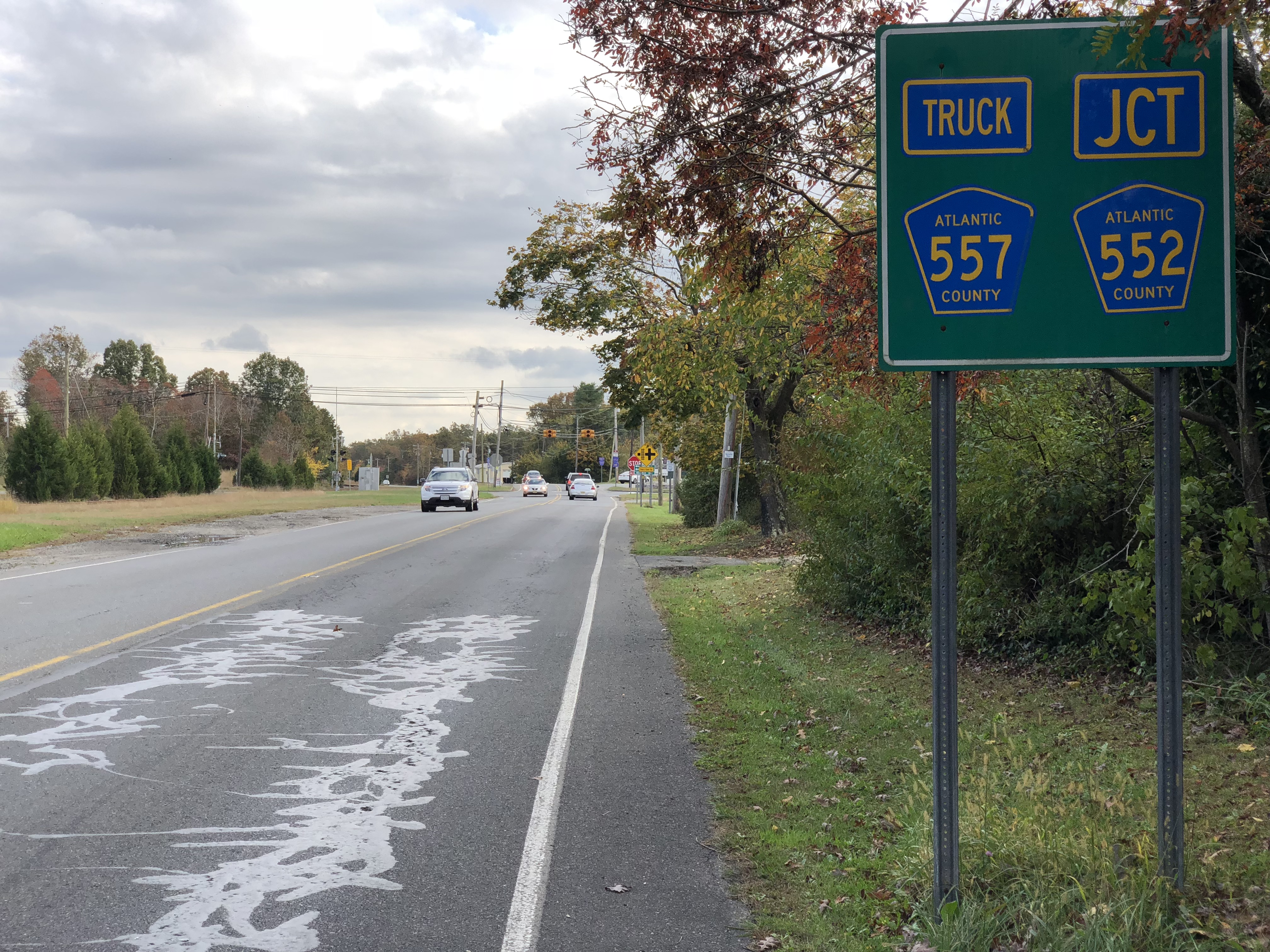
- Southbound CR 557 in Milmay

- Location in Atlantic County Location in New Jersey Location in the United States
- Coordinates: 39°26′21″N 74°51′25″W
- Country: United States
- State: New Jersey
- County: Cumberland, Atlantic
- Townships: Buena Vista; Maurice River

Area
  - Total: 8.22 sq mi (21.29 km^{2})
  - Land: 8.20 sq mi (21.25 km^{2})
  - Water: 0.012 sq mi (0.03 km^{2})
- Elevation: 98 ft (30 m)

Population (2020)
  - Total: 919
  - Density: 112.0/sq mi (43.24/km^{2})
- Time zone: UTC−05:00 (Eastern (EST))
  - Summer (DST): UTC−04:00 (EDT)
- ZIP Code: 08340
- Area codes: 609, 640
- FIPS code: 34-46710
- GNIS feature ID: 878393

Milmay is an unincorporated community and census-designated place (CDP) located mostly within Buena Vista Township, in Atlantic County, in the U.S. state of New Jersey. Part of the CDP extends southwest into Maurice River Township in Cumberland County.

As of the 2020 census, Milmay had a population of 919.

Milmay is located at the junction of County Routes 552 and 557 7.7 miles (12.4 km) southeast of Buena. Milmay has a post office with ZIP Code 08340.

== Demographics ==
Historical population
Census	Pop.	Note	%±
2020	919		—
U.S. Decennial Census; 2020

Milway was first listed as a census designated place in the 2020 U.S. census.

Milmay CDP, New Jersey – Racial and ethnic composition Note: the US Census treats Hispanic/Latino as an ethnic category. This table excludes Latinos from the racial categories and assigns them to a separate category. Hispanics/Latinos may be of any race.
Race / Ethnicity (NH = Non-Hispanic)	Pop 2020	2020
White alone (NH)	792	86.18%
Black or African American alone (NH)	17	1.85%
Native American or Alaska Native alone (NH)	1	0.11%
Asian alone (NH)	13	1.41%
Native Hawaiian or Pacific Islander alone (NH)	0	0.00%
Other race alone (NH)	6	0.65%
Mixed race or Multiracial (NH)	27	2.94%
Hispanic or Latino (any race)	63	6.86%
Total	919	100.00%

As of 2020, the population was 919.

== Education ==
The portions of the CDP in Atlantic County are in the Buena Regional School District.

The portions of the CDP in Cumberland County are in the Maurice River Township School District.
