= New Jersey Route 55 =

State highway in southern, New Jersey, US

Route 55
- Veterans Memorial Highway
- Route 55 highlighted in red

Route information
- Maintained by NJDOT
- Length: 40.54 mi (65.24 km)
- Existed: 1969–present
- History: Completed in 1989

Major junctions
- South end: Route 47 in Maurice River Township
- Route 49 in Millville; Route 47 in Millville; Route 56 in Vineland; US 40 in Franklin Township; US 322 / CR 536 in Harrison Township
- North end: Route 42 in Deptford Township

Location
- Country: United States
- State: New Jersey
- Counties: Cumberland, Salem, Gloucester

Highway system
- New Jersey State Highway Routes; Interstate; US; State; Scenic Byways
← Route 54	→ Route 56

Route 55 is a freeway in the southern part of the U.S. state of New Jersey. Also known as the Veterans Memorial Highway, it runs 40.54 miles (65.24 km) from an intersection with Route 47 in Port Elizabeth north to an interchange with Route 42 in Gloucester County. The Route 55 freeway serves as a main road through Cumberland and Gloucester counties, serving Millville, Vineland, and Glassboro. It is used as a commuter route north to Philadelphia and, along with Route 47, as a route from the Delaware Valley to the Jersey Shore resorts in Cape May County. Route 55 has a posted speed limit of 65 miles per hour (105 km/h) for most of its length.

What is now Route 55 was originally proposed in the 1950s as a toll road called the Cape May Expressway that was to run from the Walt Whitman Bridge to Cape May. In 1962, the New Jersey Expressway Authority was created to build the Cape May Expressway and the Atlantic City Expressway. However, by 1965, the road to Cape May was turned over to the New Jersey Department of Transportation (NJDOT) and designated as Route 55, which was to run from Westville to Cape May Court House. The first portion of the route opened around Millville in 1969 while the section bypassing Vineland was completed in the 1970s. Route 55 was completed north to Deptford in 1989.

Meanwhile, the portion between Route 47 in Port Elizabeth and the Garden State Parkway in Middle Township was canceled in 1975 due to the impact the highway would have on the surrounding environment.

== Route description ==
=== Cumberland and Salem counties ===
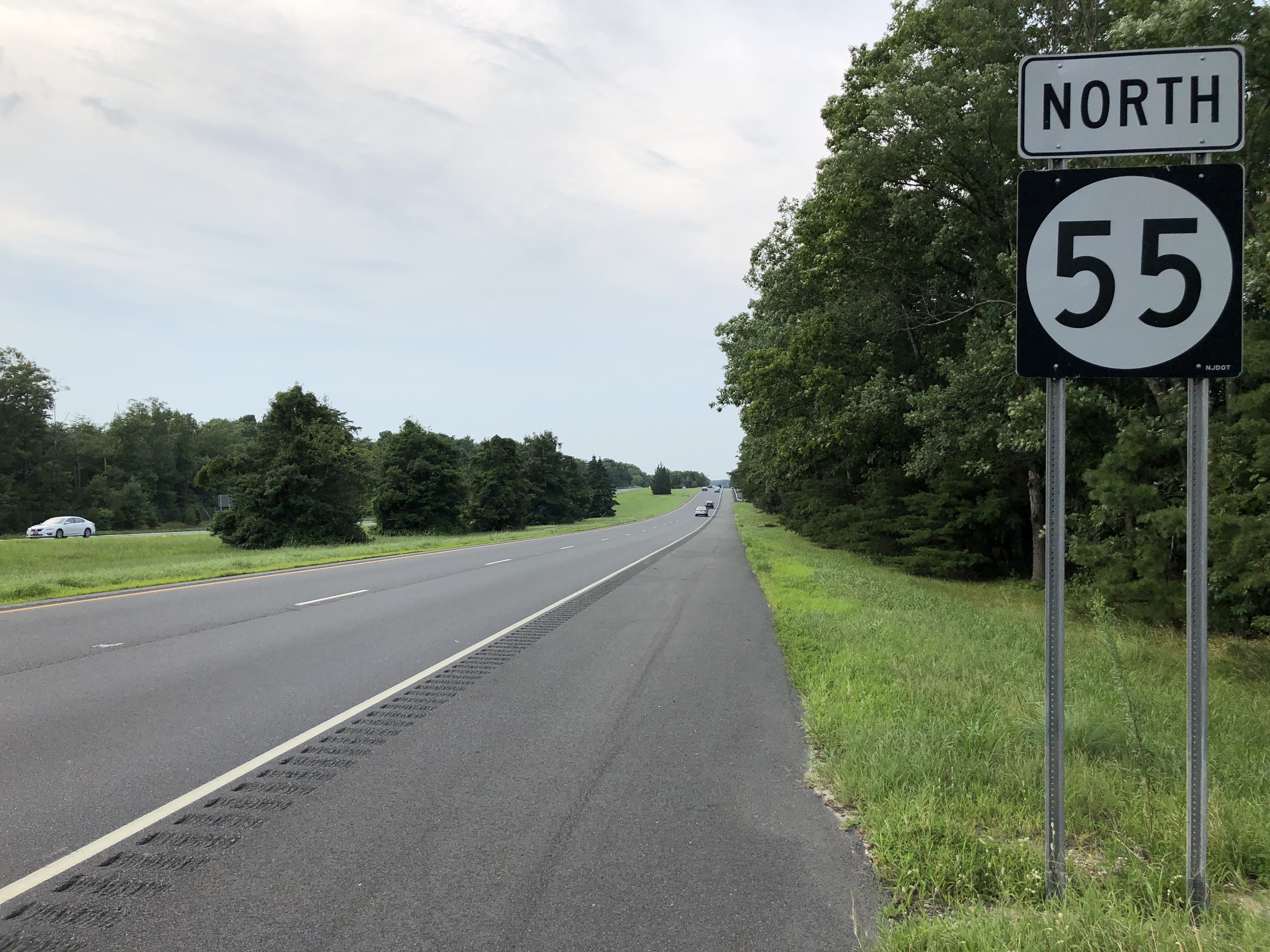
Route 55 northbound past the Route 49 interchange in Millville

Route 55 begins at a signalized intersection with Route 47 in the Port Elizabeth section of Maurice River Township, Cumberland County, heading to the north as a two-lane freeway through wooded areas. At the southern terminus, the road continues south as part of Route 47. A short distance after beginning, the road becomes a four-lane freeway and comes to a southbound exit and northbound entrance with Schooner Landing Road. Past this interchange, Route 55 enters Millville and crosses over the Manantico Creek as it heads into built-up areas. The freeway continues north to an interchange with Route 49.

Past the Route 49 interchange, Route 55 continues through Millville, passing over County Route 552 Spur (CR 552 Spur). The route passes to the east of WheatonArts, which is also home to the Creative Glass Center of America, before turning northwest and crossing into Vineland, where it interchanges with CR 555.

The freeway turns to the west past the CR 555 interchange and crosses over Conrail Shared Assets Operations' Vineland Secondary railroad line before entering Millville again. At this point, the route comes to a modified cloverleaf interchange with Route 47 adjacent to the Cumberland Mall. From Route 47, the freeway enters forested areas again and makes a turn to the north, crossing back into Vineland. In Vineland, it interchanges with CR 552 near Inspira Medical Center Vineland. This exit also serves the Rowan College of South Jersey Cumberland Campus to the east.

Route 55 continues between rural areas near the Maurice River to the west and development to the east, coming to a cloverleaf interchange with Route 56. Past this interchange, the route passes over a Winchester and Western Railroad line before crossing over CR 540. Farther north, a modified cloverleaf interchange serves CR 674 (Garden Road), which provides access to the northern part of Vineland. Past the Garden Road interchange, Route 55 continues through farmland and woodland, passing to the east of Rudys Airport. The freeway crosses Scotland Run and briefly runs through Pittsgrove Township in Salem County.

=== Gloucester County ===
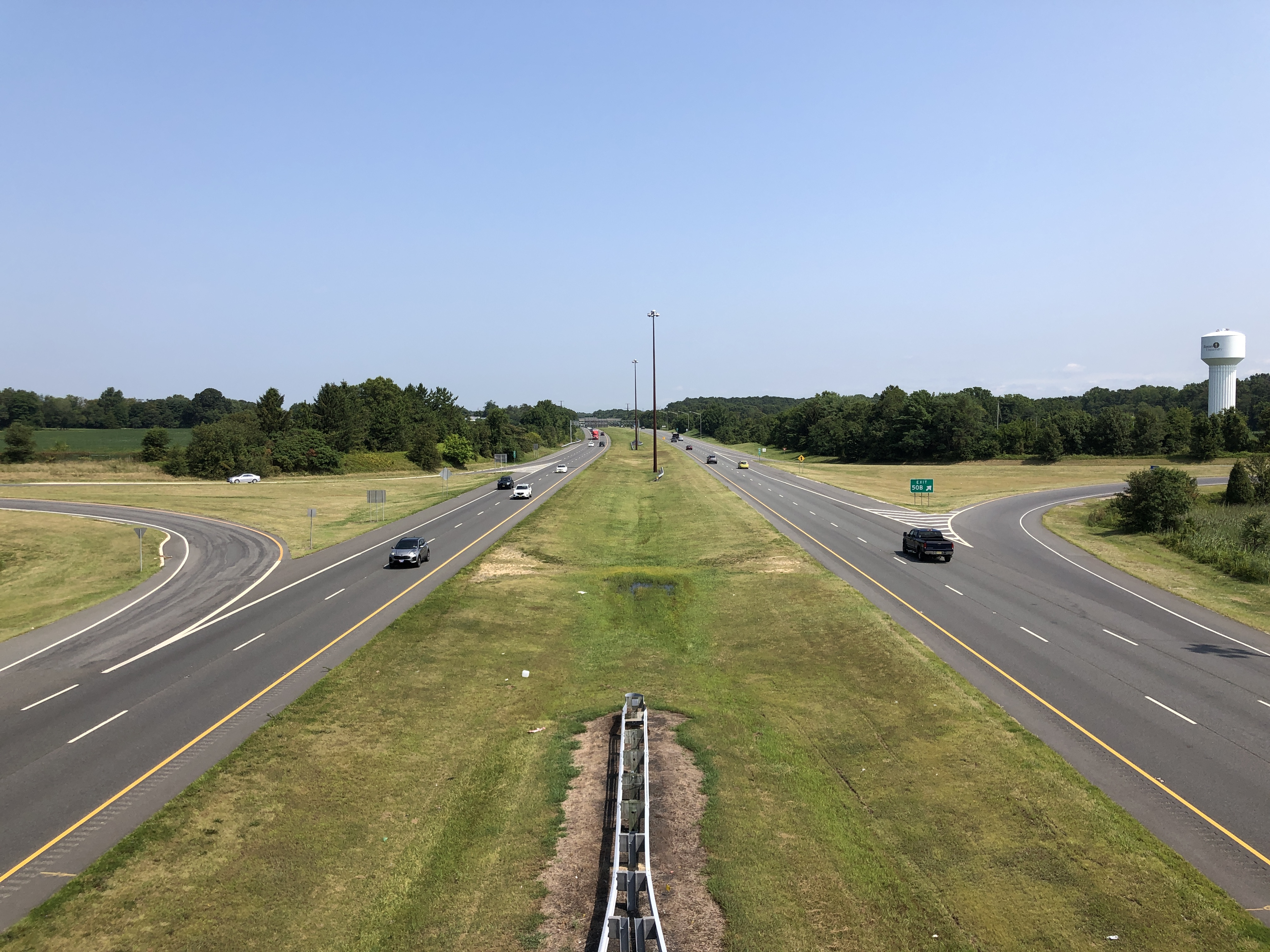
Route 55 northbound at US 322 in Harrison Township

Route 55 continues northwest into Franklin Township, Gloucester County, and reaches a cloverleaf interchange with U.S. Route 40 (US 40). Past this interchange, the freeway heads north, crossing over CR 538. Route 55 comes to a diamond interchange with Little Mill Road before entering Clayton and turning to the west. A short distance later, Route 55 continues into Elk Township and comes to an interchange with CR 553.

The route continues north into Glassboro, where it has an interchange with CR 641. Past this interchange, Route 55 crosses into Harrison Township and meets US 322 and CR 536 at a cloverleaf interchange near Inspira Medical Center Mullica Hill. US 322 heads east into Glassboro and serves Rowan University.

Past the US 322 interchange, the freeway continues through agricultural areas and enters Mantua Township, where it turns northeast and crosses under CR 553 Alternate. Route 55 passes under Conrail Shared Assets Operations' Vineland Secondary railroad line before intersecting CR 553 again at a modified cloverleaf interchange. This interchange provides access to The Broadway Theatre of Pitman.

Past CR 553, the route turns north again and passes near more suburban surroundings, briefly entering Washington Township before crossing into Deptford Township. In Deptford Township, Route 55 comes to a cloverleaf interchange with Route 47. Northbound Route 47 heads toward the Rowan College of South Jersey Gloucester Campus in Sewell. It crosses CR 534 before coming to a trumpet interchange with Deptford Center Road that provides access to CR 621 and the Deptford Mall. Past this interchange, Route 55 passes under CR 544 and CR 621 before merging onto Route 42 and coming to an end.

== History ==
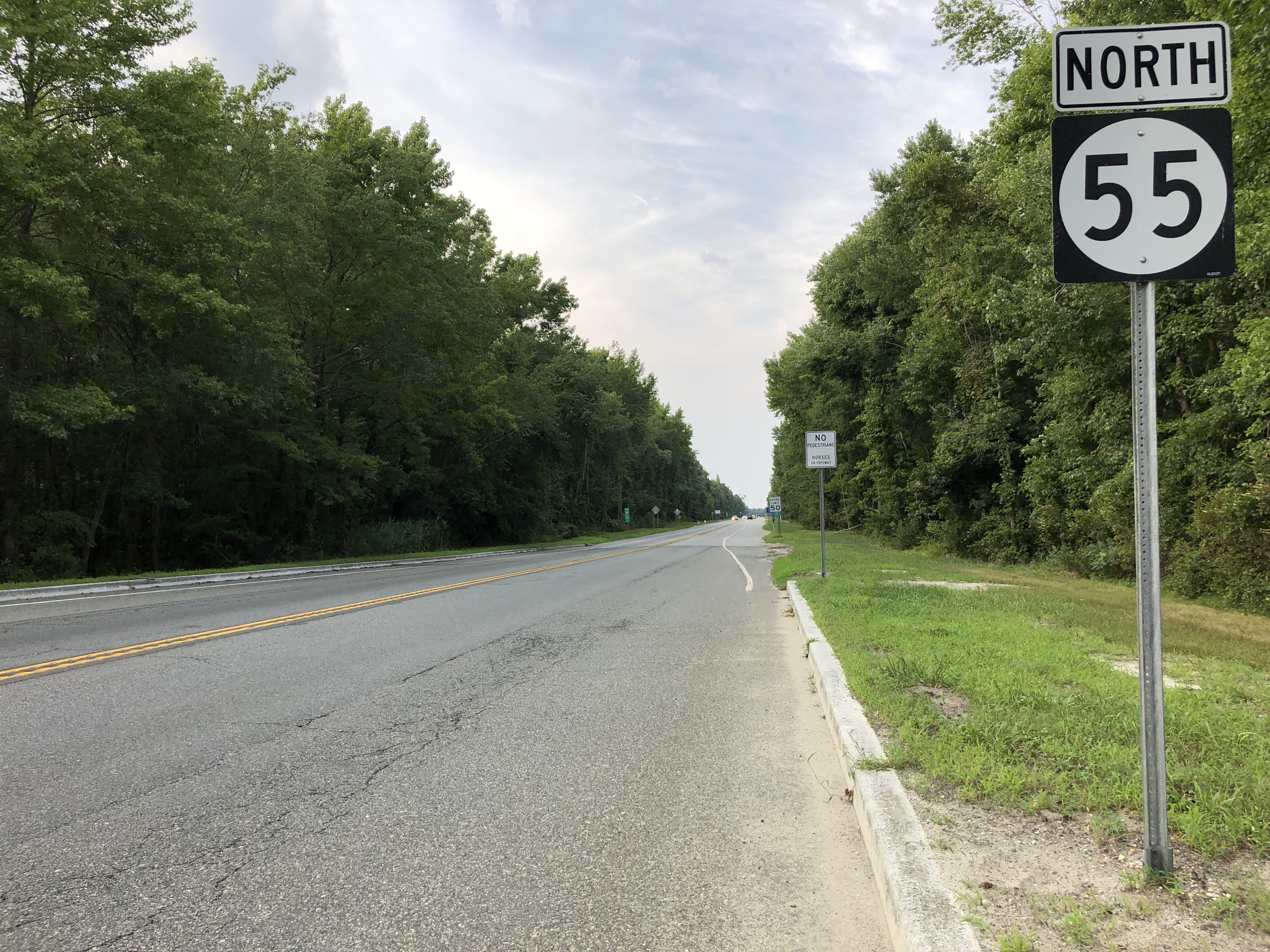
View north at the south end of Route 55 at Route 47 in Maurice River Township

Following the completion of the Walt Whitman Bridge in the 1950s, two controlled-access toll roads were proposed to connect the bridge to Atlantic City and to Cape May. In 1962, the New Jersey Expressway Authority Act was signed into law. This act created the New Jersey Expressway Authority, which was to manage both the Atlantic City and Cape May expressways.

While the Atlantic City Expressway was completed by the authority in 1965, the Cape May Expressway was turned over to the state about this time. The Cape May Expressway was designated Route 55 and legislated to run from US 130 in Westville to US 9 near Cape May Court House. This proposed freeway was projected to cost $90 million (equivalent to $898 million in 2024) and be completed in 1975.

In 1969, the first segment of Route 55 opened between Maurice River Township and the Vineland-Millville border, connecting to Route 47 at both ends. In the 1970s, the planned northern terminus of Route 55 was moved to Route 42 in Deptford. The portion of Route 55 between Route 47 in Millville and US 40 in Franklin Township was completed in the mid-1970s while the portion between US 40 and Route 42 was completed in October 1989. The Route 55 freeway has been instrumental in bringing economic development to southern New Jersey. The most common use of the highway is as a commuting route northward to Philadelphia. Following its completion, residential development in the southern part of Gloucester County has increased.

While the freeway was under construction in 1983, it was discovered that it ran through Native American burial grounds in Deptford. This revelation led to unsuccessful lawsuits to cease construction of the route. After the lawsuits, a couple of incidents happened to construction workers, including a construction worker being run over by an asphalt truck, another being blown off a bridge by strong winds, and a van carrying five construction workers randomly erupting into flames.

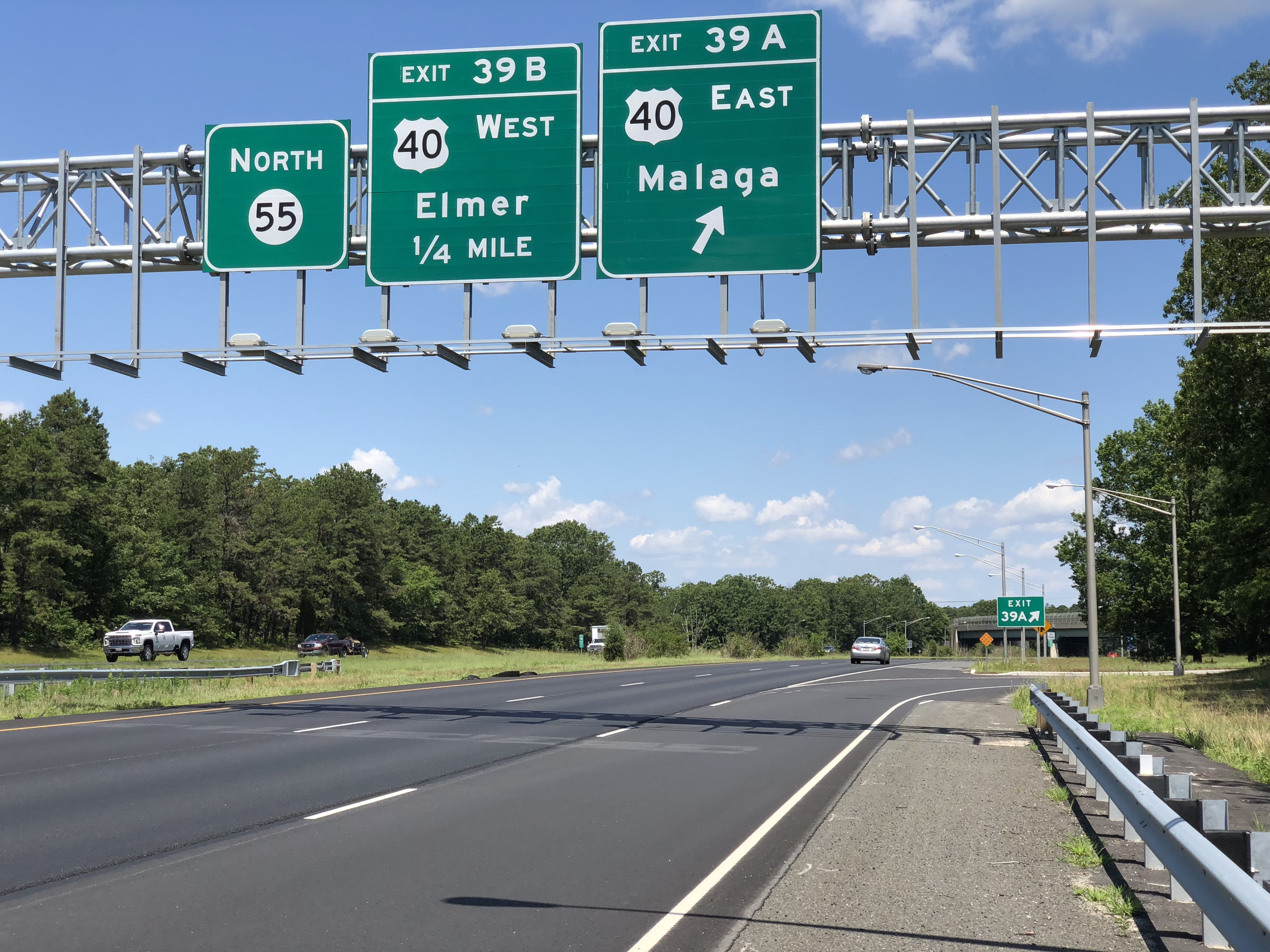
Route 55 northbound at the US 40 interchange in Franklin Township

Meanwhile, the portion of freeway south of Route 47 in Maurice River Township was not yet built. In 1972, NJDOT wanted to provide adequate access to the Cape May Peninsula by extending the freeway southeast from the current terminus to the Garden State Parkway in Middle Township. NJDOT conducted an environmental study on this proposal in 1975. The route was projected to cost $155 million (equivalent to $906 million in 2024) and be finished by 1995. Plans resurfaced for a southern extension in 1993 when a feasibility study was conducted to see if the extension of Route 55 could be built. This study, which estimated the extension would cost between $423 million and $483 million (equivalent to $921 million and $1.05 billion in 2024), concluded that the road should not be built because it crossed too many wetlands.

The Route 55 freeway, like many other highways in New Jersey, once had solar-powered emergency call boxes every mile (about 1.6 km); the use of the call boxes became limited due to the increasing popularity of cell phones. To save on maintenance costs, NJDOT removed these call boxes in 2005.

Despite the fact that the southern extension was held up for decades, it was revisited due to the disturbing images of Hurricane Katrina and Hurricane Rita in 2005 in the Gulf states. Route 55 could have been extended in order to provide a proper evacuation route for Cape May Peninsula and surrounding area. In addition, traffic jams along Route 47 during the summer also led to a possible revival of the proposal. There were efforts and studies to consider finishing the remaining 20 miles (32 km) of the missing freeway.

In 2009, State Senator Jeff Van Drew introduced a plan for an extension of Route 55 into Cape May County where the South Jersey Transportation Authority would build the road. In order to reduce the impact on the environment, the freeway would have been elevated. The extension of Route 55 would have been tolled. This effort followed two years of failed attempts for a feasibility study to relieve traffic on Route 47.

However, all of these efforts faced considerable environmental opposition, which has been successful in blocking these plans, which were estimated to cost as much as $2 billion.

== Public transportation ==
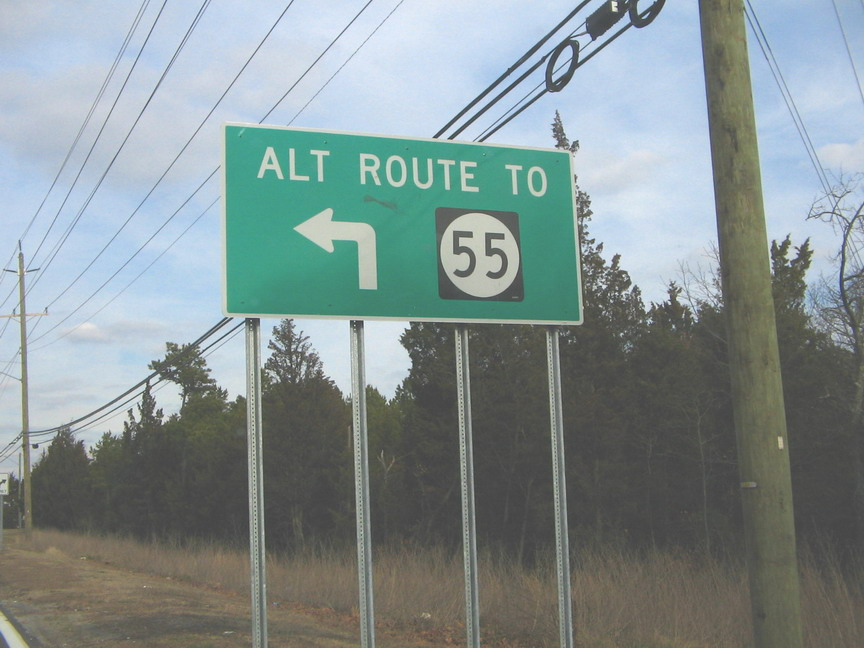
A sign on US 9 in Cape May County designating an alternate route to Route 55

In 1975, the Delaware River Port Authority (DRPA) proposed that a Port Authority Transit Corporation (PATCO) rail line be added along the median of Route 55 between Deptford and Glassboro; however, plans were canceled. In the 2000s, another proposal resurfaced to add a PATCO line along the Route 55 corridor. The alternative called for park and ride lots to be constructed along the Route 55 corridor, providing access to the line. Phase I would have run to Glassboro (Rowan University) and Phase II would have extended down to the Millville area and service the Cumberland Mall area.

New Jersey Governor Jon S. Corzine and the DRPA announced a comprehensive transportation plan for South Jersey on May 12, 2009. This plan would introduce express bus service along the Route 55 freeway and the adjacent Route 42 freeway. It would also include a diesel light rail line called the Glassboro–Camden Line between Camden and Glassboro via Woodbury over an existing railroad right-of-way (as opposed to the expanded PATCO line via Route 55), improvements to NJ Transit's Atlantic City Line, and enhanced connections to the Atlantic City International Airport.

== Exit list ==
Exit numbers are based on the originally planned terminus of Route 55 in Cape May County, a distance of approximately 20 miles (32 km).

County	Location	mi	km	Exit	Destinations	Notes
Cumberland	Maurice River Township	20.00	32.19		Route 47 (Delsea Drive) – Port Elizabeth, Wildwood, Cape May	Southern terminus; at-grade intersection
Cumberland	Maurice River Township	21.49	34.58	21	Schooner Landing Road	Southbound exit and northbound entrance
Cumberland	Millville	24.59	39.57	24	Route 49 – Millville, Bridgeton	
Cumberland	Vineland	26.88	43.26	26	CR 555 – Vineland, Buena	
Cumberland	Millville	27.79	44.72	27	Route 47 – Vineland, Millville	
Cumberland	Vineland	29.75	47.88	29	CR 552 – Bridgeton, South Vineland	
Cumberland	Vineland	32.69	52.61	32	Route 56 – Vineland, Rosenhayn	Signed as exits 32A (east) and 32B (west)
Cumberland	Vineland	35.01	56.34	35	Garden Road (CR 674) – Brotmanville, North Vineland	Signed as exits 35A (east) and 35B (west) southbound
Salem	No major junctions					
Gloucester	Franklin Township	39.36	63.34	39	US 40 – Malaga, Elmer	Signed as exits 39A (east) and 39B (west)
Gloucester	Franklin Township	43.50	70.01	43	Little Mill Road – Franklinville, Clayton	
Gloucester	Elk Township	45.36	73.00	45	CR 553 – Centerton, Clayton, Glassboro	
Gloucester	Glassboro	48.84	78.60	48	CR 641 – Ferrell, Glassboro	
Gloucester	Harrison Township	50.50	81.27	50	US 322 – Glassboro, Richwood, Mullica Hill	Signed as exits 50A (east) and 50B (west)
Gloucester	Mantua Township	53.48	86.07	53	CR 553 – Pitman, Glassboro, Wenonah, Woodbury Heights	Signed as exits 53A (south) and 53B (north) southbound
Gloucester	Deptford Township	56.37	90.72	56	Route 47 to Route 41 – Washington Township, Glassboro, Woodbury, Westville	Signed as exits 56A (south) and 56B (north)
Gloucester	Deptford Township	58.90	94.79	58	To CR 621 – Deptford Township, Almonesson	Access via Deptford Center Road
Gloucester	Deptford Township	60.54	97.43		Route 42 north to I-76 west – Camden, Philadelphia	Northern terminus; exit 13 on Route 42
1.000 mi = 1.609 km; 1.000 km = 0.621 mi: Incomplete access
