= County Route 552 (New Jersey) =

Highway in New Jersey, United States

County Route 552
- CR 552 highlighted in red

Route information
- Length: 27.48 mi (44.22 km)

Major junctions
- West end: CR 606 in Bridgeton
- Route 77 in Bridgeton; CR 553 in Upper Deerfield Township; Route 55 in Vineland; Route 47 in Vineland; CR 555 in Vineland; CR 552 Spur in Vineland; CR 557 in Buena Vista Township
- East end: US 40 in Hamilton Township

Location
- Country: United States
- State: New Jersey
- Counties: Cumberland, Atlantic

Highway system
- County routes in New Jersey; 500-series routes
| ← CR 551 | → CR 553 |

County Route 552 (CR 552) is a county highway in the U.S. state of New Jersey. The highway extends 27.48 miles (44.22 km) from Laurel Street (Cumberland County Route 606) in Bridgeton to Harding Highway (U.S. Route 40) in Hamilton Township.

== Route description ==
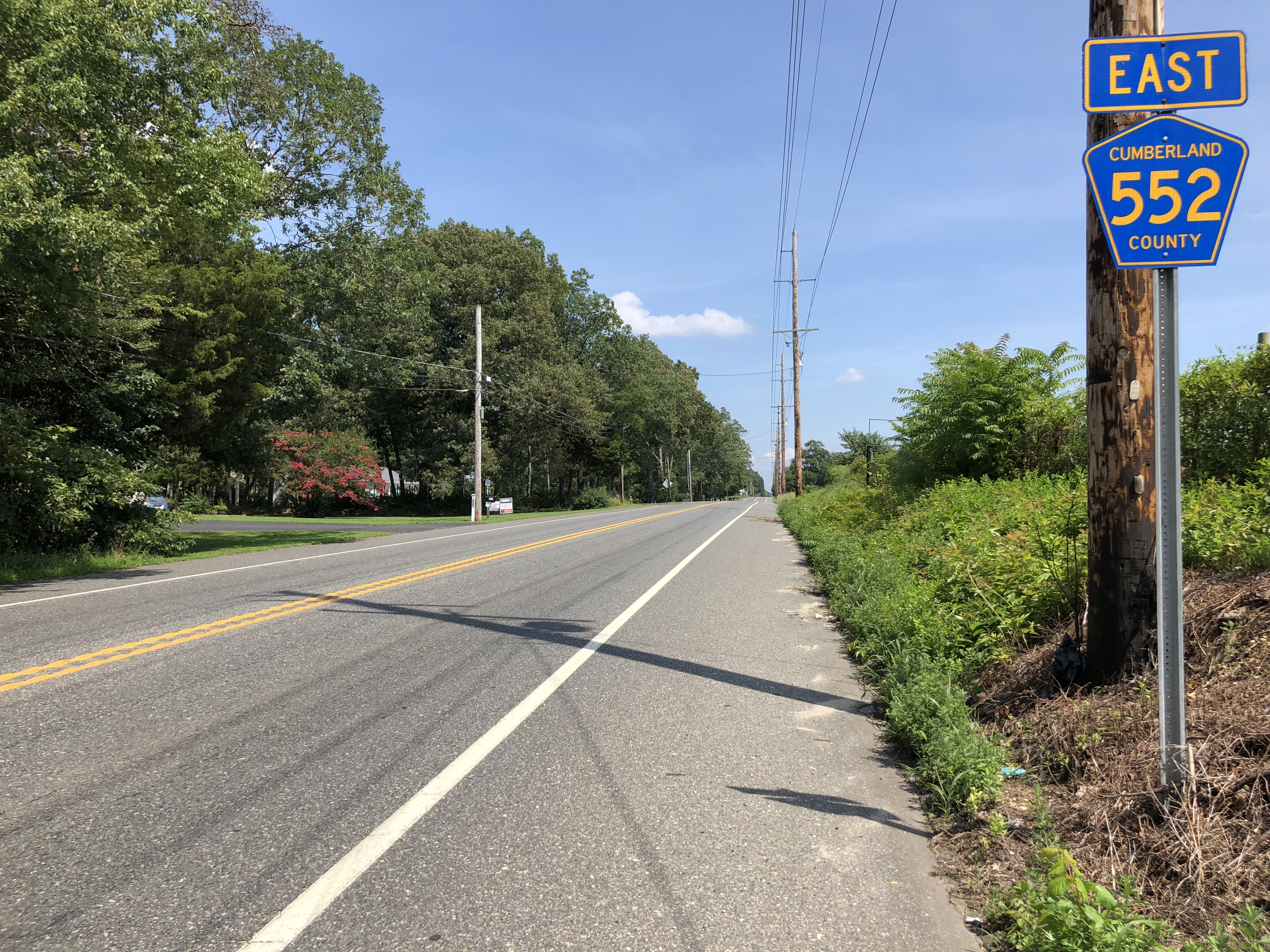
View east along CR 552 at CR 553 in Upper Deerfield Township

CR 552 begins at an intersection with CR 606 in Bridgeton, Cumberland County, heading east on two-lane undivided Irving Avenue. At the next intersection, the route crosses Route 77 and passes homes and businesses, crossing a Winchester and Western Railroad line before reaching intersections with CR 669 and CR 638 in more residential surroundings. A short distance after the CR 638 intersection, the road crosses into Upper Deerfield Township and enters more rural areas of development, turning east into a mix of farms and woods at the CR 654 junction. CR 552 crosses CR 553 before entering Deerfield Township, where the route intersects CR 675 and CR 705. The road enters more forested areas before passing homes as it intersects CR 682, CR 634, and CR 608. At this point, CR 552 turns to the northeast onto Sherman Avenue and passes farms to the north and forests to the south, reaching junctions with CR 717 and CR 636.

The route curves east into forested areas as it enters Vineland and crosses the Maurice River. CR 552 reaches an interchange with the Route 55 freeway before passing Inspira Medical Center Vineland and crossing CR 628. The road heads through a mix of woods and businesses as it comes to the Route 47 junction. From here, the route passes a mix of farms, woods, and homes as it intersects CR 615 at the crossing of Conrail Shared Assets Operations' Vineland Secondary. CR 552 continues through more wooded areas of homes as it crosses CR 555 and CR 655, turning southeast at the intersection with the latter. The route turns south at the CR 673 junction and passes through forests as it comes to an intersection with CR 552 Spur. At this point, CR 552 turns east-northeast onto Mays Landing Road and continues through dense forest with some homes, crossing CR 671 and turning east. After crossing the Manumuskin River, the road heads into Maurice River Township and runs through more rural areas.

CR 552 enters Buena Vista Township in Atlantic County and heads northeast through wooded areas with residences as Broad Street, crossing CR 557 and the Beesleys Point Secondary railroad line operated by the Cape May Seashore Lines railroad. The road continues into Hamilton Township and heads east into forested areas with a few areas of homes. CR 552 continues east to its terminus at an intersection with US 40 in commercial areas.

== Major intersections ==
| County | Location | mi | km | Destinations | Notes |
|---|---|---|---|---|---|
| Cumberland | Bridgeton | 0.00 | 0.00 | CR 606 (Laurel Street) | Western terminus |
| Cumberland | Bridgeton | 0.07 | 0.11 | Route 77 (Pearl Street) | |
| Cumberland | Upper Deerfield Township | 2.89 | 4.65 | CR 553 (South Woodruff Road) to Route 49 | |
| Cumberland | Vineland | 9.26 | 14.90 | Route 55 | Exit 29 (Route 55) |
| Cumberland | Vineland | 10.42 | 16.77 | Route 47 (Delsea Drive) – Malaga, Millville | |
| Cumberland | Vineland | 11.87 | 19.10 | CR 555 (South Main Road) – Vineland, Millville | |
| Cumberland | Vineland | 15.27 | 24.57 | CR 552 Spur west (Mays Landing Road) – Millville | |
| Atlantic | Buena Vista Township | 21.99 | 35.39 | CR 557 (Tuckahoe Road) | |
| Atlantic | Hamilton Township | 27.48 | 44.22 | US 40 (Harding Highway) | Eastern terminus |
1.000 mi = 1.609 km; 1.000 km = 0.621 mi

== Special routes ==
County Route 552 Spur
- Location: Millville–Vineland
- Length: 3.41 mi (5.49 km)

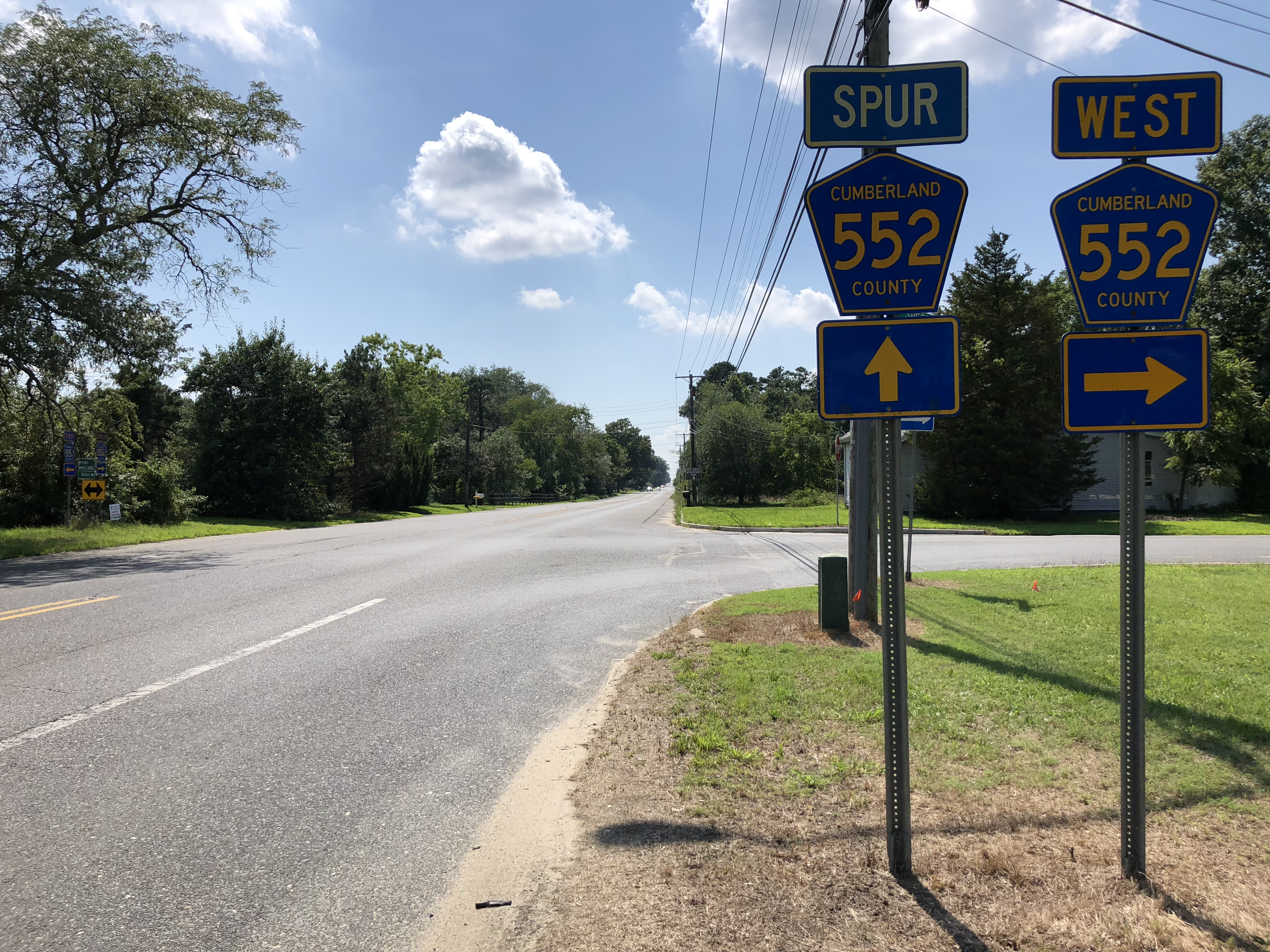
The junction of CR 552 and CR 552 Spur in Vineland

County Route 552 Spur extends 3.41 miles (5.49 km) from Third Street (CR 555) to the west in Millville to Sherman Avenue (CR 552) in Vineland to the east. County Route 552 does not go through Millville.

The alignment of CR 552 Spur also was co-designated as Cumberland County Route 28, which also followed CR 552 east of Sherman Avenue.
