= County Route 540 (New Jersey) =

County highway in New Jersey, U.S.

County Route 540
- CR 540 highlighted in red

Route information
- Length: 43.16 mi (69.46 km)
- Tourist routes: Bayshore Heritage Byway

Major junctions
- West end: US 130 in Carneys Point Township
- I-295 in Carneys Point Township; N.J. Turnpike / US 40 in Carneys Point Township; Route 45 in Mannington Township; CR 581 in Alloway Township; Route 77 in Upper Deerfield Township; CR 553 in Pittsgrove Township; Route 47 in Vineland; CR 555 in Vineland; CR 557 in Buena Vista Township
- East end: US 40 / CR 622 in Buena Vista Township

Location
- Country: United States
- State: New Jersey
- Counties: Salem, Cumberland, Atlantic

Highway system
- County routes in New Jersey; 500-series routes
| ← CR 539 | → CR 541 |

County Route 540 (CR 540) is a county highway in the U.S. state of New Jersey. The highway extends 43.16 miles (69.46 km) from the intersection of U.S. Route 130 (US 130) and Route 140 in Carneys Point Township to Harding Highway (US 40) in Buena Vista Township.

Mile markers on CR 540 continue from Route 140's mileage, which would indicate a short concurrency with Route 140 to that road's western terminus at US 130, while posted signage indicates CR 540's western terminus is at Route 140's eastern terminus at US 40.

== Route description ==
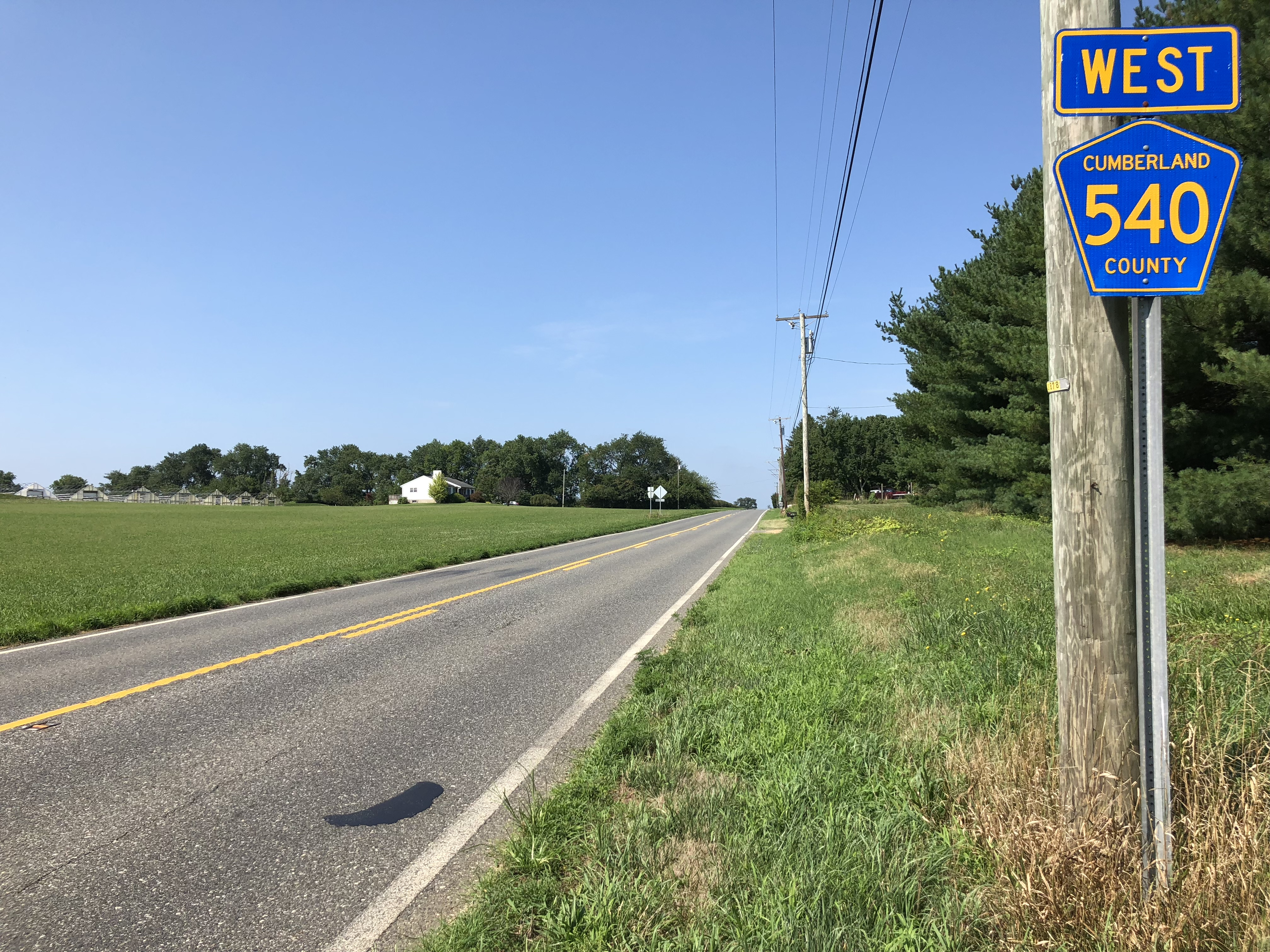
View west along CR 540 at CR 723 in Hopewell Township

The first 0.92 mi (1.48 km) of CR 540 are concurrent with the entire length of Route 140, running southeast through commercial areas of Carneys Point Township from an intersection with US 130 and interchanging with I-295 and the New Jersey Turnpike/US 40 at the point US 40 splits from the New Jersey Turnpike. From the east end of Route 140, signage for CR 540 begins past US 40, with the route heading southeast on two-lane undivided Hawks Bridge Road. The road runs through residential neighborhoods before crossing the Salem River into Mannington Township. The route intersects CR 631 as it heads through forests before entering a mix of woods and farms as the road turns south and briefly becomes a divided highway at the CR 646 junction. From here, CR 540 becomes Pointers Road and runs through more agricultural areas, crossing the marshy Mannington Creek before briefly turning southeast onto Bypass Road and intersecting CR 620 and Route 45.

Here, CR 540 turns to the east and forms a concurrency with Route 45, passing some homes before heading into farm fields with occasional residences. CR 540 splits from Route 45 by heading southeast on Welchville Road and passing through more farmland, crossing CR 653. After an intersection with CR 676, the road turns south-southeast into Alloway Township and crosses the SMS Rail Lines' Salem Branch line, entering more wooded areas with some farms. The route intersects CR 664 and CR 657 before crossing the Alloway Creek into the residential community of Alloway, where it heads south and comes to junctions with CR 581 and CR 640. From here, CR 540 heads southeast into more forested areas with occasional homes, entering Quinton Township. Upon coming to an intersection with CR 647 and CR 667, the route turns east onto Harmons Mill-Cohansey Road and enters agricultural areas, crossing back into Alloway Township and crossing CR 635. A short distance later, the route enters Hopewell Township in Cumberland County and becomes Deerfield Road as it comes to intersections with CR 721 and CR 723. The road enters Upper Deerfield Township in wooded areas before passing more farms as the route crosses CR 663 and Route 77. CR 540 continues northeast and crosses CR 677, at which point the road heads into a mix of farmland and woodland, intersecting CR 612, CR 711, and CR 687.

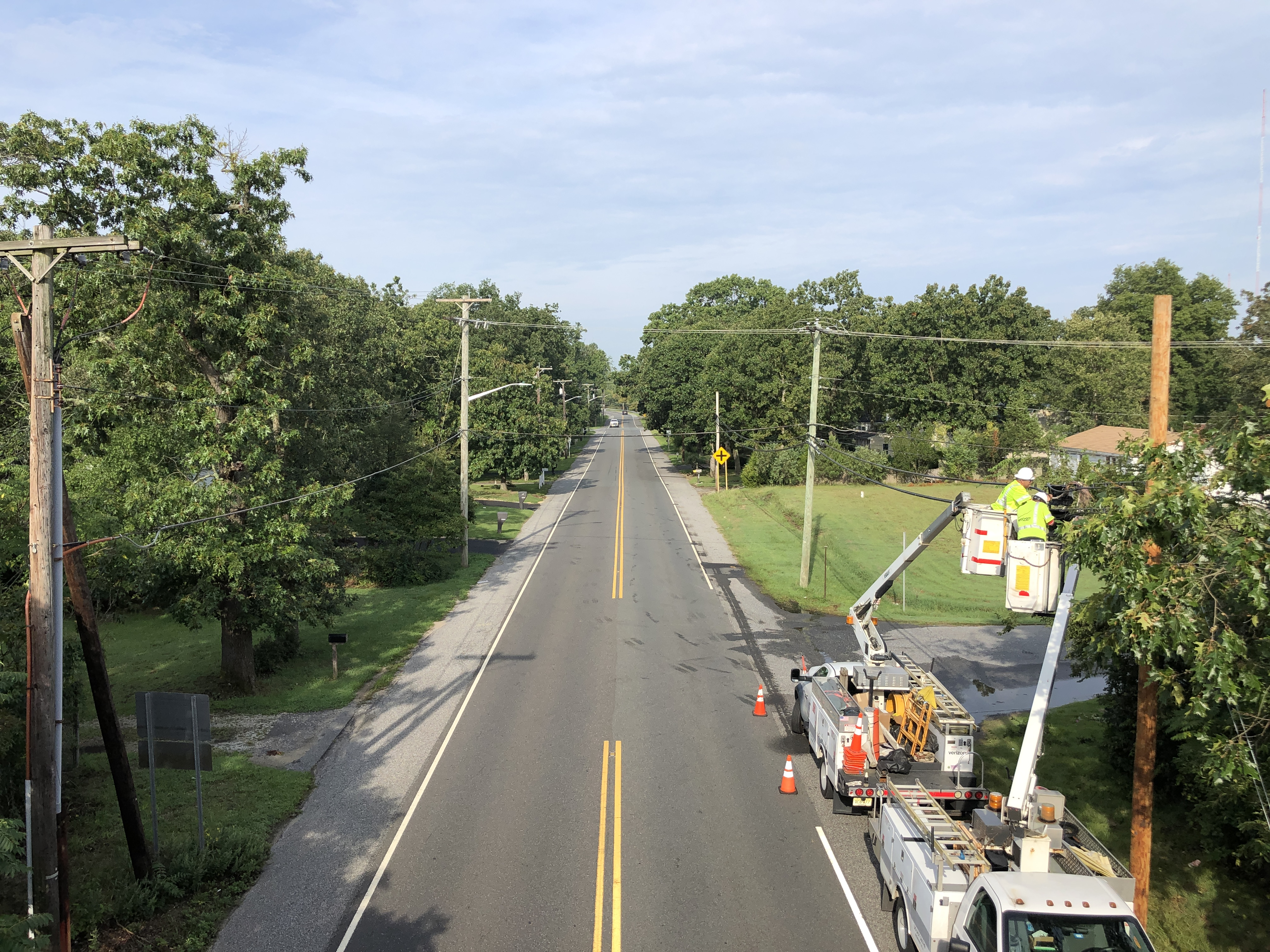
CR 540 westbound past Route 55 in Vineland

The route continues into Pittsgrove Township, Salem County and becomes Centerton Road and forms a concurrency with CR 553 as the road passes near Centerton Pond in wooded areas. Upon splitting from CR 553, CR 540 heads southeast on Norma Road and passes near some development before entering forested areas within Parvin State Park. Near Parvin Lake, the route crosses CR 645 and continues past farms. After crossing CR 638, CR 540 runs through a mix of farms, woods, and homes. Upon crossing the Maurice River in a forested area, the route continues east into Vineland in Cumberland County, where the name becomes Almond Road. The road passes under the Route 55 freeway and heads into wooded residential areas. CR 540 crosses CR 628 before splitting from Almond Road by turning south onto Quigley Avenue, with CR 747 continuing east on Almond Road. A block later, the route turns east onto Park Avenue and comes to an intersection with Route 47. Past this intersection, CR 540 becomes a five-lane road with a center left-turn lane and enters commercial areas before passing homes. The route crosses CR 615 and Conrail Shared Assets Operations' Vineland Secondary railroad line before crossing a Southern Railroad of New Jersey line a short distance later. From here, the road narrows back to two lanes and passes through wooded residential neighborhoods prior to reaching the CR 555 junction.

At this point, CR 540 turns south to follow CR 555 on four-lane Main Road before splitting from that route by turning east onto two-lane Landis Avenue. The route heads through less dense areas of residential development as it crosses CR 672 before intersecting CR 655 in commercial areas. Following the intersection with the latter, the road passes through woods as it crosses into Buena Vista Township, Atlantic County, where the road passes through agricultural areas with some homes, crossing CR 671. After the junction with CR 557, CR 540 turns northeast onto Cedar Avenue and passes through wooded areas of homes prior to reaching its eastern terminus at US 40, where the road continues as CR 622.

== Major intersections ==
| County | Location | mi | km | Destinations | Notes |
|---|---|---|---|---|---|
| Salem | Carneys Point Township | 0.00 | 0.00 | US 130 Route 140 begins | Western terminus; western terminus of Route 140 |
| Salem | Carneys Point Township | 0.47 | 0.76 | I-295 / CR 551 south – Delaware Memorial Bridge | Exits 2B-C on I-295; western end of CR 551 concurrency |
| Salem | Carneys Point Township | 0.66 | 1.06 | CR 551 north (South Pennsville-Auburn Road) – Swedesboro | Eastern end of CR 551 concurrency |
| Salem | Carneys Point Township | 0.96 | 1.54 | N.J. Turnpike / US 40 (Wiley Road) to I-295 south – Atlantic City, Delaware Memorial Bridge Route 140 ends | Interchange; eastern terminus of Route 140; no eastbound access to NJTP south |
| Salem | Mannington Township | 7.54 | 12.13 | Route 45 south – Salem | Western end of Route 45 concurrency |
| Salem | Mannington Township | 8.70 | 14.00 | Route 45 north | Eastern end of Route 45 concurrency |
| Salem | Alloway Township | 13.15 | 21.16 | CR 581 (Main Street) – Quinton, Elmer | |
| Cumberland | Upper Deerfield Township | 22.17 | 35.68 | Route 77 – Mullica Hill, Bridgeton | |
| Salem | Pittsgrove Township | 25.89 | 41.67 | CR 553 south (Centerton Road) – Centerton, Parvin State Park, Bridgeton | Western end of CR 553 concurrency |
| Salem | Pittsgrove Township | 26.00 | 41.84 | CR 553 north (Buck Road) – Olivet, Elmer | Eastern end of CR 553 concurrency |
| Cumberland | Vineland | 33.31 | 53.61 | Route 47 (Delsea Drive) – Glassboro, Millville | |
| Cumberland | Vineland | 35.72 | 57.49 | CR 555 north (Main Road) | Western end of CR 555 concurrency |
| Cumberland | Vineland | 36.10 | 58.10 | CR 555 south (South Main Road) | Eastern end of CR 555 concurrency |
| Atlantic | Buena Vista Township | 41.72 | 67.14 | CR 557 (Tuckahoe Road) – Buena, Landisville, Hammonton, Tuckahoe, Wildwood, Cape May | |
| Atlantic | Buena Vista Township | 43.16 | 69.46 | US 40 (Harding Highway) – Malaga, Atlantic City | Eastern terminus |
1.000 mi = 1.609 km; 1.000 km = 0.621 mi: Concurrency terminus
