= New Jersey Route 54 =

State highway in Atlantic County, New Jersey, US

Route 54

Route information
- Maintained by NJDOT
- Length: 11.86 mi (19.09 km)
- Existed: March 30, 1938–present

Major junctions
- South end: US 40 / CR 557 / CR 619 in Buena Vista Township
- US 322 in Folsom; Route 73 / CR 561 Spur in Folsom; A.C. Expressway in Hammonton
- North end: US 30 / US 206 in Hammonton

Location
- Country: United States
- State: New Jersey
- Counties: Atlantic

Highway system
- New Jersey State Highway Routes; Interstate; US; State; Scenic Byways
← Route 53	→ Route 55

Route 54 (known locally as 12th Street for much of its length) is a state highway located in Atlantic County in New Jersey, United States. It is considered to be a southern extension of U.S. Route 206 (US 206), running 11.86 mi (19.09 km) from an intersection with US 206 and US 30 in Hammonton south to an intersection with US 40 in Buena Vista Township. The road passes through the center of Hammonton before running into rural areas. It intersects US 322 and Route 73 in Folsom and the Atlantic City Expressway in Hammonton.

What is now Route 54 was originally legislated on March 30, 1938, to run from US 30/US 206 in Hammonton south to Main Road in Landis Township (part of present-day Vineland). The only part taken over as a state highway and designated Route 54 was north of US 40 in Buena, the proposed route south of this point remained as county-maintained Wheat Road. In 1953, Route 54 was defined onto its current alignment. A freeway was proposed along the Route 54 corridor in the late 1960s to connect the southern terminus of US 206 in Hammonton to Route 55 in the Vineland/Millville area; it was eventually canceled.

== Route description ==
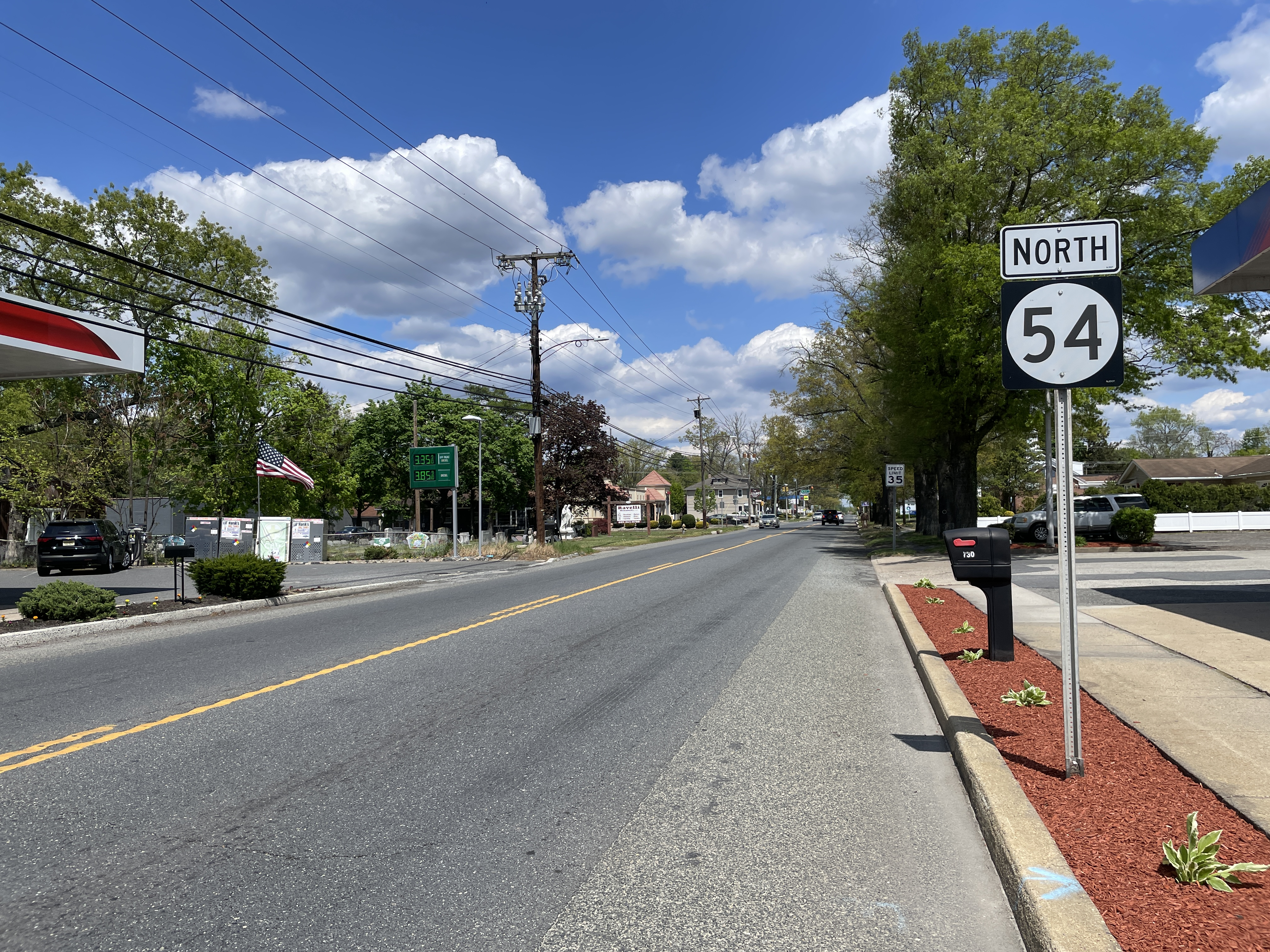
View north along Route 54 at CR 559 in Hammonton

Route 54 begins at an intersection with US 40/County Route 557 (CR 557) and CR 619 on the border of Buena and Buena Vista Township. Known as Buena Hammonton Road, it proceeds north-northeast as a two-lane undivided road through agricultural areas, forming the border between Buena to the west and Buena Vista Township to the east. After fully entering Buena Vista Township and becoming 12th Street, the road reaches an intersection with CR 690 and makes a turn more to the northeast. At this point, Route 54 enters forested areas, with a few breaks for residences. Upon entering Folsom, the route passes over the Beesleys Point Secondary railroad line operated by the Cape May Seashore Lines railroad before coming to a cloverleaf interchange with US 322 (Black Horse Pike). After this interchange, the road comes to a crossroads with Route 73, which is signed as CR 561 Spur. Following this intersection, Route 54 heads through a mix of woods and farm fields as it enters Hammonton and reaches a partial cloverleaf interchange with the Atlantic City Expressway. In the area of this interchange, the route is a four-lane divided highway.

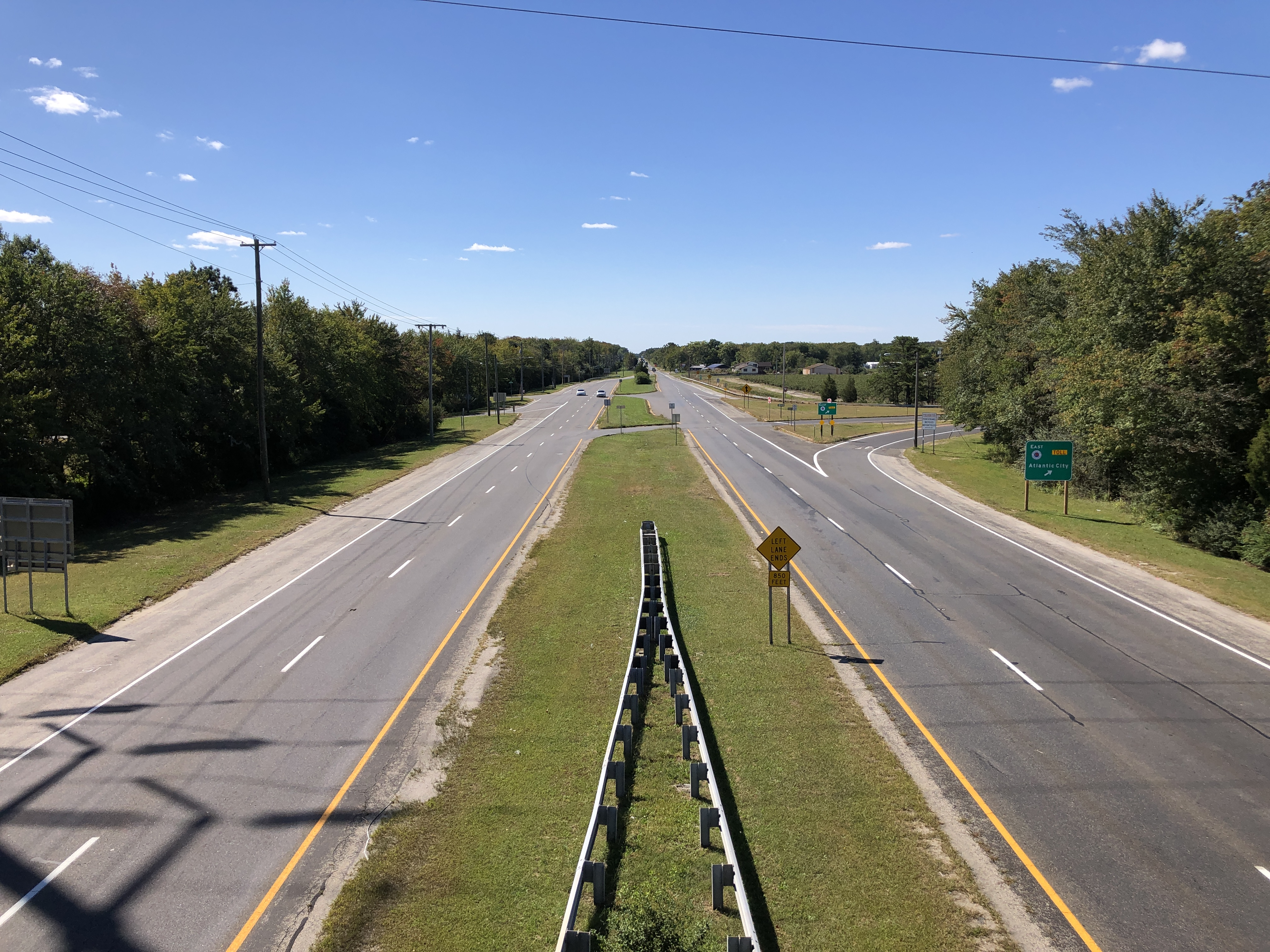
Route 54 southbound at the Atlantic City Expressway interchange in Hammonton

Past the Atlantic City Expressway, the two-lane undivided road comes to an intersection with CR 559. From this point, Route 54 is lined with residences and businesses as it comes into downtown Hammonton. The road crosses NJ Transit’s Atlantic City Line at-grade immediately before a junction with CR 561. After CR 561, the route becomes Bellevue Avenue and encounters the western terminus of CR 542. As the road leaves the downtown area, the surroundings become more residential. Route 54 ends at an intersection with US 30 and US 206, where the road continues north as US 206.

== History ==
By 1927, what is now Route 54 was an unnumbered, unpaved road connecting Buena to Hammonton. Route 54 was legislated on March 30, 1938, to run from US 30/Route 43 and US 206/Route 39 in Hammonton south along Lincoln Avenue to an intersection with Main Road in Landis Township, Cumberland County (now a part of Vineland). The only portion of Route 54 that was taken over as a state highway was north of the US 40/Route 48 intersection in Buena. The portion of Lincoln Avenue south of US 40 remained a county route called CR 25 in Cumberland County and CR 55 and CR 19 in Atlantic County. This road is presently both Cumberland and Atlantic CRs 655 and a part of Atlantic CR 619. In the 1953 New Jersey state highway renumbering, Route 54 was defined onto its current alignment between US 40 in Buena Vista and US 30/US 206 in Hammonton. In the late 1960s, a freeway was proposed for the US 206/Route 54 corridor, running from US 30 in Hammonton south to Route 55 and the proposed Route 60 near Vineland and Millville. The freeway between Vineland/Millville and Hammonton was to cost $47 million and was intended to provide a better route between the two areas than the existing two-lane roads. This proposed freeway was never built due to environmental and financial issues.

== Major intersections ==
The entire route is in Atlantic County.

Location	mi	km	Destinations	Notes
Buena–Buena Vista Township line	0.00	0.00	US 40 / CR 557 (Harding Highway) – Tuckahoe, Mays Landing, Malaga	Southern terminus
Folsom	6.67	10.73	US 322 (Black Horse Pike) – Camden, Atlantic City	Interchange
Folsom	7.58	12.20	Route 73 / CR 561 Spur (Mays Landing Road) – Blue Anchor, Atlantic City	
Hammonton	8.71	14.02	A.C. Expressway – Camden, Philadelphia, Atlantic City	Exit 28 on A.C. Expressway
Hammonton	10.01	16.11	CR 559 (Chew Road) – Blue Anchor, Weymouth	
Hammonton	10.65	17.14	CR 561 (Egg Harbor Road)	
Hammonton	10.76	17.32	CR 542 east (Central Avenue)	Western terminus of CR 542
Hammonton	11.86	19.09	US 30 (White Horse Pike) / US 206 north to N.J. Turnpike (I-95 Toll) – Berlin, Atlantic City, Trenton	Northern terminus
1.000 mi = 1.609 km; 1.000 km = 0.621 mi: Tolled
