= Centerton, Salem County, New Jersey =

Populated place in Salem County, New Jersey, US

Centerton, New Jersey
- Unincorporated community
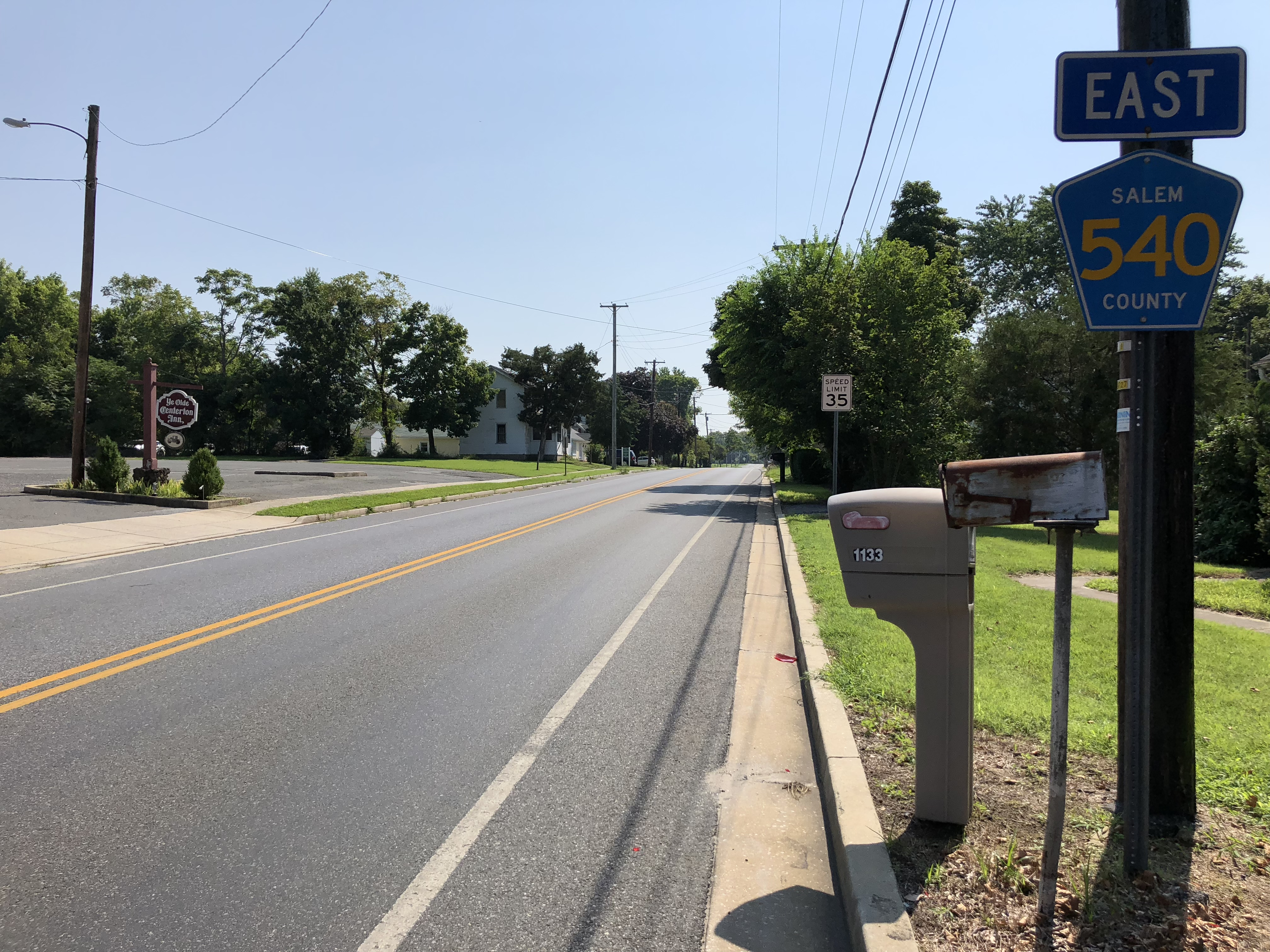
- CR 540 eastbound through Centerton

- Centerton's location in Salem County (Inset: Salem County in New Jersey) Centerton, New Jersey (New Jersey) Centerton, New Jersey (the United States)
- Coordinates: 39°31′31″N 75°10′04″W
- Country: United States
- State: New Jersey
- County: Salem
- Township: Pittsgrove
- Elevation: 82 ft (25 m)
- Time zone: UTC−05:00 (Eastern (EST))
  - Summer (DST): UTC−04:00 (EDT)
- Area code: 856
- GNIS feature ID: 875333

Centerton is an unincorporated community located within Pittsgrove Township in Salem County, in the U.S. state of New Jersey. County Route 540 is a major road that travels through Centerton and passes Centerton Pond. Route 55 provides access to Centerton, via exit 45 (County Route 553 – Clayton, Glassboro). Centerton is approximately 5 miles (8.0 km) west of Vineland in Cumberland County.

Centerton is home to the historic Centerton Inn, which was completed around 1706 and is rumored to have had George Washington stay there.

== Public safety ==
Centerton's local policing is handled by the New Jersey State Police.

The local fire department is Centerton Fire Company. Pittsgrove Township Board of Fire Commissioner's District 3 handles all fire department business and is one of three fire districts in Pittsgrove Township.

== Notable people ==
People who were born in, residents of, or otherwise closely associated with Centerton include:

- Thomas Whitaker Trenchard (1863-1942), lawyer and a Justice of the New Jersey Supreme Court between 1906 and 1941, who was presiding judge in the Lindbergh kidnapping trial of Richard Hauptmann.
