= County Route 555 (New Jersey) =

Highway in New Jersey, United States

County Route 555
- CR 555 highlighted in red

Route information
- Length: 34.20 mi (55.04 km)

Major junctions
- South end: CR 553 in Downe Township
- Route 47 / Route 49 in Millville; Route 55 in Vineland; CR 552 in Vineland; CR 540 in Vineland; US 40 in Franklin Township; CR 557 in Franklin Township; CR 538 in Franklin Township; US 322 in Monroe Township
- North end: Route 42 in Washington Township

Location
- Country: United States
- State: New Jersey
- Counties: Cumberland, Gloucester

Highway system
- County routes in New Jersey; 500-series routes
← CR 554	→ CR 557

County Route 555 (CR 555) is a county highway in the U.S. state of New Jersey. The highway extends 34.20 miles (55.04 km) from Port Norris Road (CR 553) in Downe Township to Black Horse Pike (Route 42) in Washington Township in Gloucester County.

== Route description ==
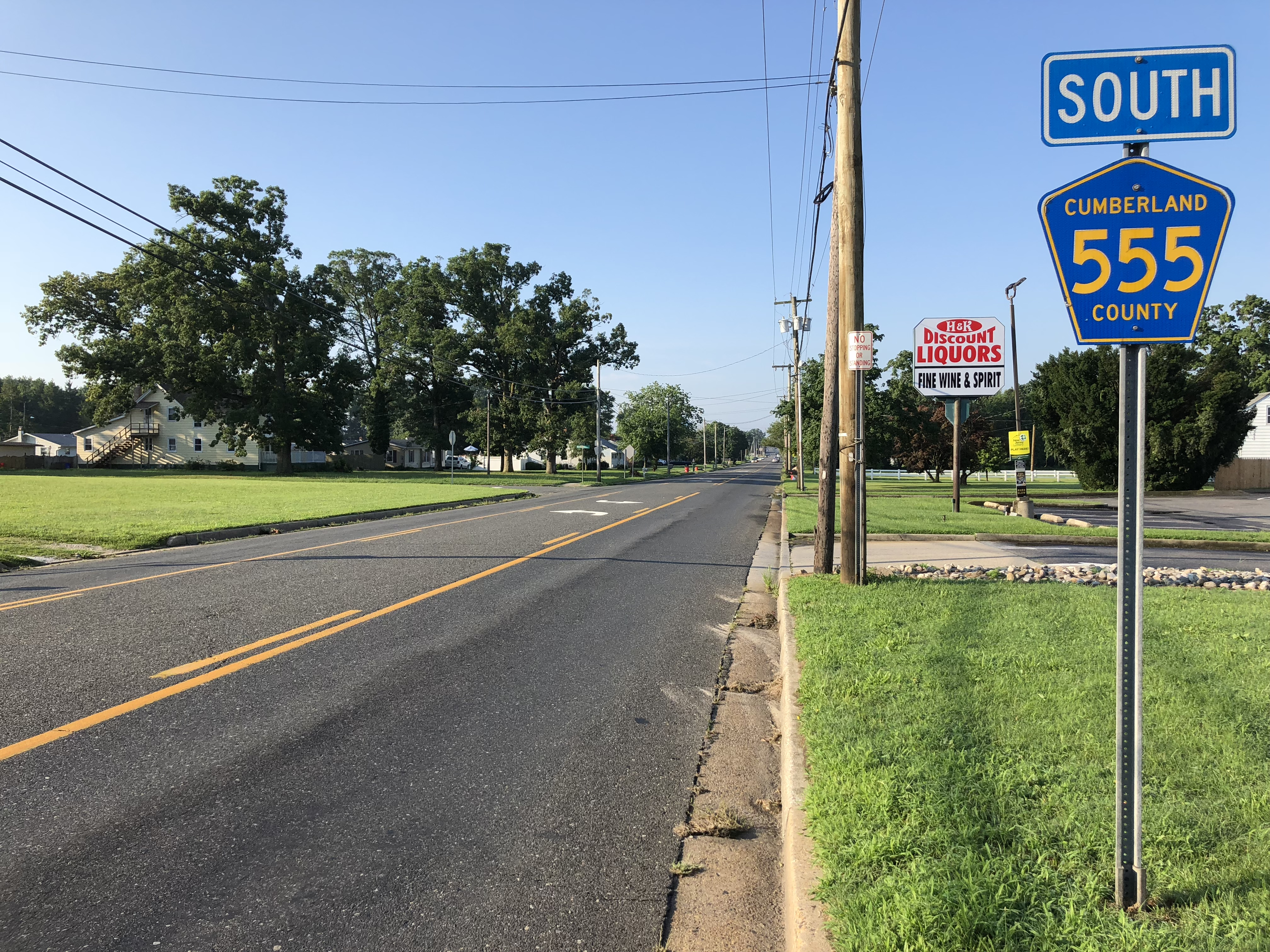
View south along CR 555 at Wheat Road in Vineland

CR 555 begins at an intersection with CR 553 in Downe Township, Cumberland County, heading northeast on two-lane undivided Church Street. The road heads northeast through woodland and marshy lakes, eventually turning north into dense forests. The route crosses a Winchester and Western Railroad line before turning northeast and crossing CR 718. At this point, CR 555 forms the border between Downe Township to the northwest and Commercial Township to the southeast, intersecting CR 767. The road crosses the Buckshutem Creek into Millville and crosses CR 670, at which point the road enters a mix of woods and fields, passing to the east of New Jersey Motorsports Park and Millville Municipal Airport. CR 555 comes to a junction with CR 627 and turns north onto Silver Run Road, running through woodland a short distance to the west of the Maurice River. The road enters wooded areas of residential and industrial development before intersecting CR 610, at which point CR 555 turns northeast onto Cedarville Avenue and passing homes. CR 555 intersects Route 49 and turns east to form a concurrency with that route on Main Street. The route crosses the Maurice River and enters downtown Millville, where it intersects Route 47.

Past Route 47, CR 555 splits from Route 49 by turning north onto Third Street. The route passes areas of homes a block to the east of Route 47, crossing a Winchester and Western Railroad line and intersecting CR 552 Spur. Past the CR 552 Spur junction, CR 555 turns northeast onto Wheaton Avenue and runs near more residences before heading into industrial areas. The route enters residential areas again before intersecting CR 678, where it heads into Vineland. A short distance later, the road interchanges with the Route 55 freeway and comes to the junction with CR 655. CR 555 continues into wooded areas of homes as South Main Road, crossing CR 552. The route continues north into more dense residential development and widens into a four lane road as it enters a mix of homes and businesses, with CR 540 joining the route for a brief concurrency. Past CR 540, CR 555 continues north past more commercial development on North Main Road, becoming a three-lane road with a center left-turn lane as it reaches an intersection with CR 681 and crosses the Southern Railroad of New Jersey's Southern Running Track line. The road continues into a mix of farms and development, narrowing back to two lanes at the CR 619 junction.

CR 555 enters Franklin Township in Gloucester County and heads north into forested areas as Main Road. The road continues through mostly wooded areas with some farms and homes as it comes to the intersection with US 40. Past this junction, the route heads into more agricultural areas with some woods and homes before heading into dense forests with residences. CR 555 turns northeast as it comes to an intersection with CR 557 and CR 659, at which point the route turns north onto Tuckahoe Road. A short distance later, the route crosses CR 538 and heads northwest through more wooded areas of homes with occasional farm fields. The road turns more to the north near Southern Cross Airport as it enters Monroe Township and comes to intersections with CR 612 and CR 610 before crossing US 322/CR 536. From here, CR 555 turns northwest into increasing areas of residential development and passing Cross Keys Airport. Upon crossing CR 654, the road heads into Washington Township and heads into a mix of homes and commercial areas as it crosses CR 689. CR 555 continues past more businesses as it reaches its northern terminus at Route 42 (Black Horse Pike).

== Major intersections ==
County	Location	mi	km	Destinations	Notes
Cumberland	Downe Township	0.00	0.00	CR 553 (Port Norris Road) – Beaver Dam, Newport, Fortescue, Port Norris	Southern terminus
Cumberland	Millville	9.70	15.61	Route 49 west – Bridgeton	South end of NJ 49 overlap
Cumberland	Millville	9.97	16.05	Route 47 (Second Street) – Vineland, Port Elizabeth	
Cumberland	Millville	10.05	16.17	Route 49 east – Tuckahoe	North end of NJ 49 overlap
Cumberland	Millville	10.50	16.90	CR 552 Spur east (Broad Street)	
Cumberland	Vineland	12.07	19.42	Route 55 – Wildwood, Cape May	Exit 26 (Route 55)
Cumberland	Vineland	13.70	22.05	CR 552 (East Sherman Avenue) to Route 55	
Cumberland	Vineland	16.56	26.65	CR 540 east (Landis Avenue)	South end of CR 540 overlap
Cumberland	Vineland	16.93	27.25	CR 540 west (East Park Avenue)	North end of CR 540 overlap
Gloucester	Franklin Township	21.50	34.60	US 40 (Harding Highway) – Malaga, Delaware Memorial Bridge, Mays Landing	
Gloucester	Franklin Township	25.84	41.59	CR 557 south – Landisville	
Gloucester	Franklin Township	26.28	42.29	CR 538 (Coles Mill Road)	
Gloucester	Monroe Township	31.29	50.36	US 322 (CR 536) – Glassboro, Williamstown, Atlantic City	
Gloucester	Washington Township	34.20	55.04	Route 42 (Black Horse Pike) – Turnersville, Williamstown	Northern terminus
1.000 mi = 1.609 km; 1.000 km = 0.621 mi
