= Inspira Health Network =

Coordinates: 39.844°N 75.150°W

Inspira Health

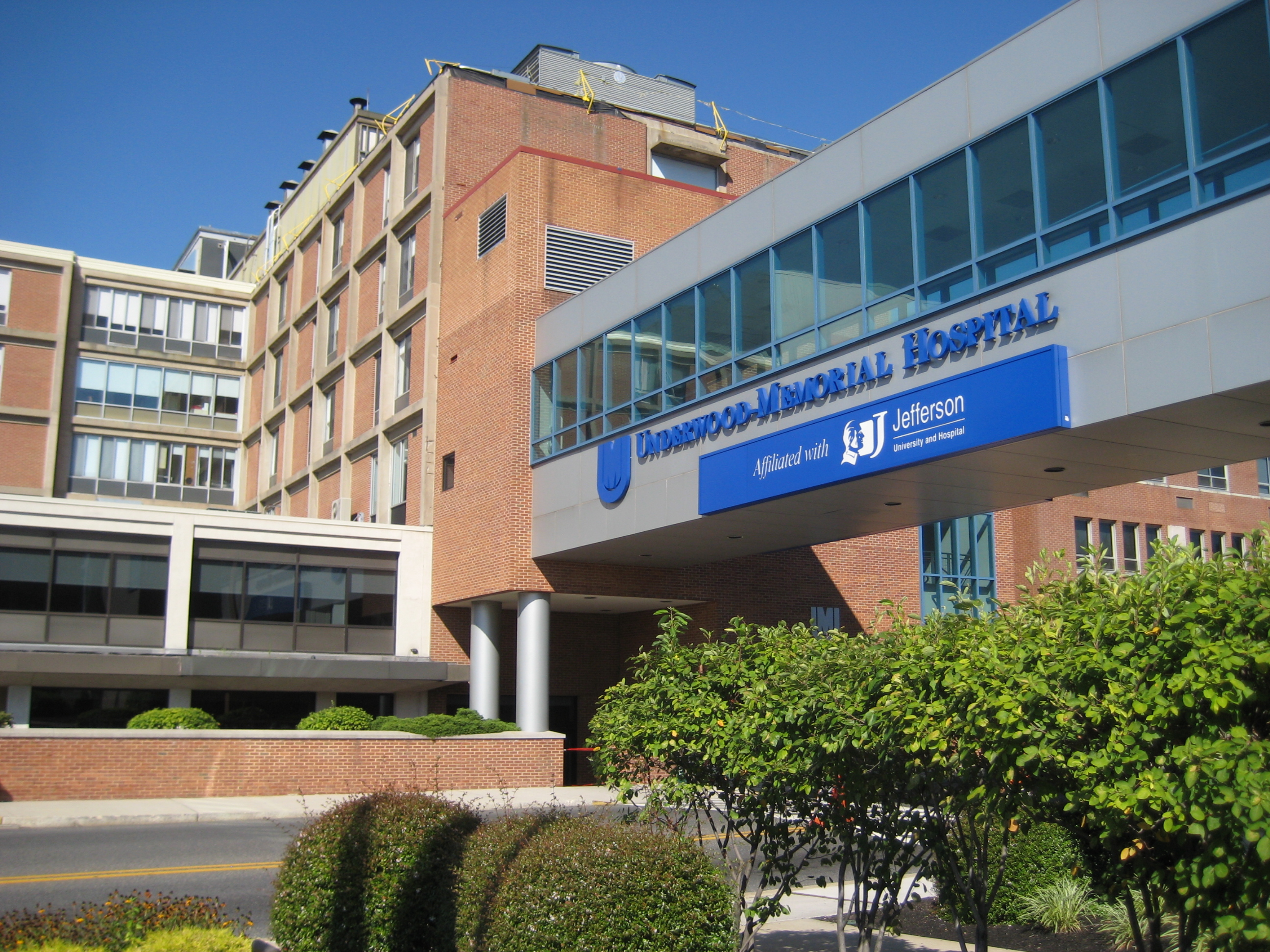

Geography
- Location: South Jersey, New Jersey, United States

Organization
- Care system: Medicare (US), Medicaid
- Type: Regional
- Affiliated university: Cooper University Hospital; Thomas Jefferson University; Rowan-Virtua School of Osteopathic Medicine

Services
- Standards: JCAHO
- Beds: 736
- Helipad: yes

History
- Opened: 1899

Links
- Website: www.inspirahealthnetwork.org
- Lists: Hospitals in New Jersey

Inspira Health is a charitable non-profit health care organization comprising three hospitals, two additional emergency rooms, and several multi-specialty health centers among other locations, located in the South Jersey region of the U.S. state of New Jersey. These include urgent care, cancer treatment, imaging, rehabilitation and primary and specialty physician practices in Gloucester, Cumberland, Salem and Camden counties. Inspira Health has 1,328 medical staff members, 907 volunteers, and 5,782 employees. It is affiliated with the Jefferson Medical College, Rowan-Virtua School of Osteopathic Medicine, and Philadelphia College of Pharmacy, among others. In 2021 it was given a grade A by the Leapfrog patient safety organization.

== Hospitals ==
Inspira Medical Center Mullica Hill was opened in December 2019 at the intersection of Route 322 and Route 55 in Mullica Hill, near the campus of Rowan University in Gloucester County. Replacing Inspira Medical Center Woodbury, it offers 220 beds as of 2024, including 18 maternity suites in addition to a pediatric emergency room, a special care nursery and a new cancer center. It is staffed by approximately 1400 employees.

Inspira Medical Center Vineland is a 298-bed facility built at the intersection of Route 55 and CR 552 in Vineland Opened in 2004, it has 305 beds and is the location of the Frank and Edith Scarpa Regional Cancer Pavilion and has approximately 2700 staff.

Inspira Medical Center Elmer has been located in Elmer since 1950. It has 83 beds and contains five birthing suites, an open visitation intensive care unit and four surgical suites.

In addition to the hospitals, Inspira maintains two community health centers with satellite emergency rooms in Woodbury (formerly Inspira Medical Center Woodbury/Underwood Memorial Hospital) and Bridgeton.

== History ==
Inspira Health formed in November 2012 by the merger of South Jersey Healthcare and Underwood-Memorial Hospital. The network traces its roots to South Jersey Healthcare's Bridgeton campus founding in 1898. Underwood and Memorial hospitals were founded in 1915 and 1916, by J. Harris Underwood, MD and William Brewer, MD, respectively; they were both physicians from Jefferson Medical College in Philadelphia, Pennsylvania. The two merged in 1966 to become Underwood Memorial Hospital.
