= County routes in New Jersey =

- Standard route markers

Highway names
- County routes: County Route X (CR X)

System links
- New Jersey State Highway Routes; Interstate; US; State; Scenic Byways

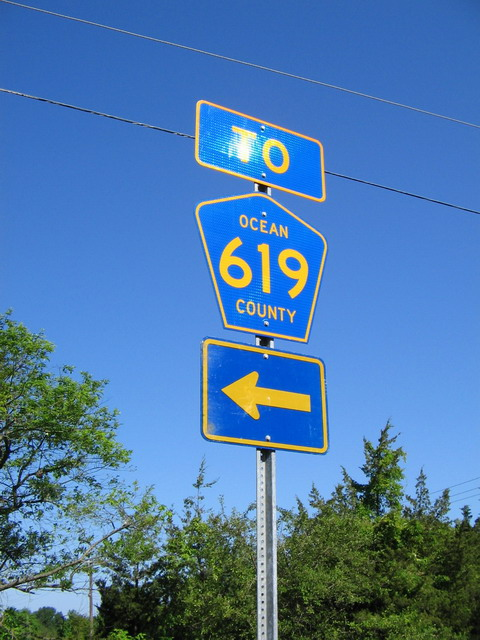
A standard pentagonal county route shield

In the U.S. state of New Jersey, county routes exist in all 21 counties. They are typically the fourth type of roadway classified below the Interstate Highway, the U.S. Route numbered highway and the state highway. The County Route system is defined by two types in New Jersey. First, 500 Series County Routes, also called state secondary routes (to the state highway), are county highways numbered in a statewide system with three-digit numbers that begin with 5. These roads form a second network of routes that supplement the facilitation of the State Routes. Each 500 Series route is unique and is not permitted to be duplicated in another county for a separate route. The second category is defined as Non-500 Series County Routes. Non-500 Series County Routes include 1-digit, 2-digit, 600 Series, 700 Series and 800 Series. These, by definition, are discontinuous across county borders and must be contained entirely within that county. Unlike 500 Series County routes, these route numbers are unique to each county, and are typically assigned to more local routes than the statewide 500-series county route system. They are typically of a lesser classification of streets like minor arterials or collector roadways rather than major arterials or thoroughfares. In the counties that use 600-series numbers, the selection of this range was coordinated within the state, gradually replacing older systems of mainly one- and two-digit routes.

With very rare exceptions (such as County Route 537), the 500 series follows the rule of cardinal direction used for Interstate Highways and U.S. Routes: even-numbered roads run east and west, while odd-numbered roads run north and south. East–west routes tend to be numbered with the lowest numbers in the northern part of the state and the highest numbers in the southern part of the state, also like the U.S. Routes. In northern New Jersey, north–south routes range from CR 501 in the east to CR 521 in the west, although numbering in the southern part of the state tends to be more haphazard.

County route numbers have not wholly replaced the preexisting names of the local roads to which they were assigned. Street signs at major intersections will denote both the local road name and the county route number if it has one. Residents who live along county routes rarely, if ever, give their address as "123 County Route 5xx" unless no name for the route has been established, as is the case in some rural areas.

== History of the 500-series ==
Bergen County 200 Series County Routes

The precursor to the 500 series was a group of three roads in Bergen County which received the numbers 200, 201, and 203 in the late 1930s. 200 ran from Oakland to Alpine; 201 ran from Ridgewood to Alpine; and 203 ran from Weehawken to Alpine. US 202 runs through Bergen County, thus the planners skipped this number.

In February 1942, a group of civil defense routes was assigned with numbers in the 500s in New York, New Jersey, and Connecticut. These roads were designed as through routes for civilian use in case the state highway system was needed by the military during World War II operations. These routes were numbered in relation to existing routes. For example, Civil Route 501 ran parallel to US 1 and Civil Route 532 was an extension of NY 32 into New Jersey.

The current series of roads in the 500s was established by the New Jersey Department of Transportation (NJDOT) on January 1, 1953. The 500-series county routes were established as a secondary highway system in case the state highway system was needed to be closed to all vehicles except military vehicles and emergency traffic if an air raid or major disaster happened. The secondary system was designed to carry through traffic and bypassed cities where possible. Some of the roads had spurs or alternate routes established; about one-third of these survive today even though such designations were eliminated from the primary state system in the 1953 New Jersey State Highway renumbering. (The others have become 600-series county routes as described below.)

== Other county routes ==
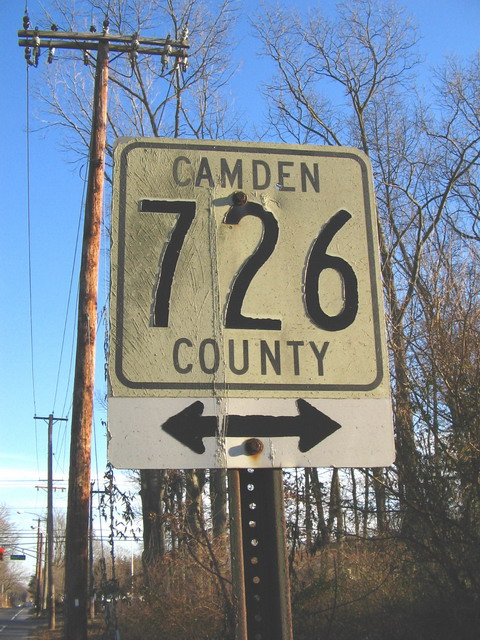
An example of a route beginning with 7 in Camden County, marked with an older square shield design

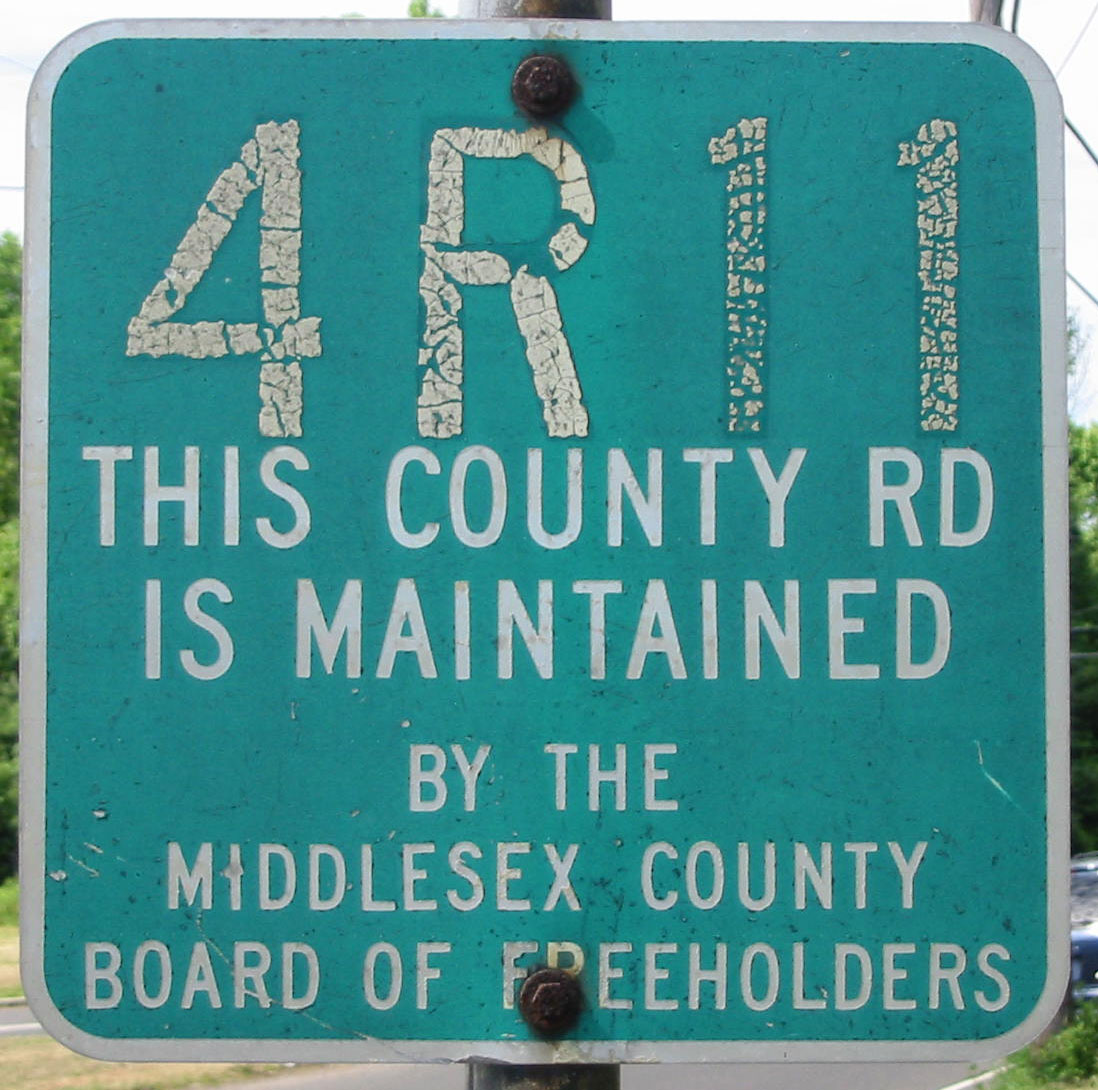
A sign for Middlesex County's pre-600-series numbering

Though historically many counties had their own numbering systems, today most counties in New Jersey follow the 500-series county routes with their own county routes numbered otherwise, typically in the 600-series. Only two counties – Bergen County and Monmouth County – have not adopted 600-series numbers. Ocean County also has a number of minor one- and two-digit routes in addition to their 600-series routes. While the majority of New Jersey's counties put signs on their 600 (or secondary) routes, Hudson County apparently doesn't sign any of them, and Ocean County has chosen to sporadically sign them. The only 600 signage to appear in Ocean County has been put up as a result of recent construction projects, which can cause confusion for those not familiar with the area.

In some counties, the 600-series numbers can break into the 700s and even 800s. Atlantic, Camden, Cumberland, Hudson, Hunterdon, Gloucester, and Passaic Counties continue past the 600-series into routes beginning with 7, and Middlesex County includes one route in the 800s, even though it has only three beginning with 7.

As every piece of New Jersey is part of an incorporated municipality, every road not designated a county or state route is locally maintained.

== See also ==
- State highways in New Jersey
