= New Jersey Route 77 =

State highway in southern, New Jersey, US

Route 77

Route information
- Maintained by NJDOT
- Length: 22.55 mi (36.29 km)
- Existed: January 1, 1953–present

Major junctions
- South end: Route 49 in Bridgeton
- Route 56 in Upper Deerfield Township; US 40 in Upper Pittsgrove Township
- North end: Route 45 in Harrison Township

Location
- Country: United States
- State: New Jersey
- Counties: Cumberland, Salem, Gloucester

Highway system
- New Jersey State Highway Routes; Interstate; US; State; Scenic Byways
← Route 76C	→ I-78
← US 46	Route 46	→ Route 47

Route 77 is a state highway in the southern part of the U.S. state of New Jersey. It runs 22.55 mi (36.29 km) from an intersection with Route 49 in Bridgeton in Cumberland County north to a junction with Route 45 in Mullica Hill in Gloucester County. It is a mostly two-lane, undivided road traversing through farmland in Cumberland, Salem, and Gloucester Counties. Along the way, Route 77 intersects Route 56 in Upper Deerfield Township and U.S. Route 40 (US 40) in Upper Pittsgrove Township.

Prior to 1927, the route was a branch of pre-1927 Route 6 that ran from Bridgeton to Mullica Hill. In 1927, it was designated as Route 46, which replaced the Bridgeton-Mullica Hill branch of pre-1927 Route 6. In 1953, it was renumbered to Route 77 to avoid conflicting with US 46 in the northern part of the state.

== Route description ==
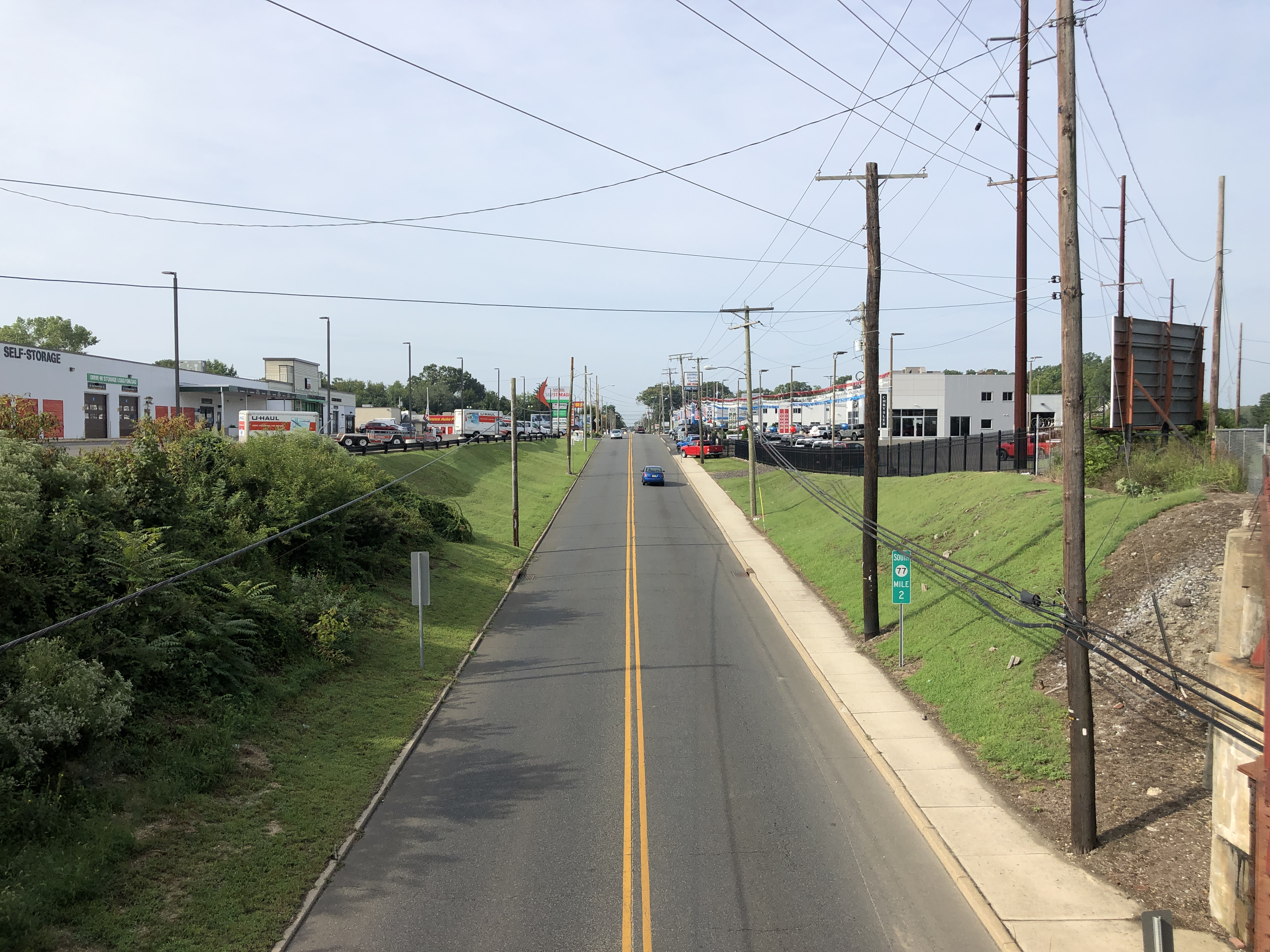
Route 77 southbound in Bridgeton

Route 77 heads north from Route 49 and County Route 609 (CR 609) in Bridgeton, Cumberland County on Pearl Street. In a short distance, the route intersects CR 670 and then crosses CR 552, which ends a block to the west at Laurel Street. It continues north through residential areas of Bridgeton, meeting CR 665 and CR 659. Route 77 heads into a commercial area, passing under a Winchester and Western Railroad line and crossing into Upper Deerfield Township at the junction with Laurel Plaza Drive. The route intersects the western terminus of Route 56 and CR 622, where the route is briefly a four-lane road. Past this junction, Route 77 heads into farmland, where it encounters several county roads including CR 704, CR 617, and CR 658. It heads north into Seabrook, where it meets CR 743 and CR 711. Route 77 intersects CR 612 and CR 630 before crossing CR 540 in Deerfield. Past CR 540, the route has junctions with CR 640 and CR 730. Route 77 then encounters CR 614, the last county route intersection in Cumberland County.

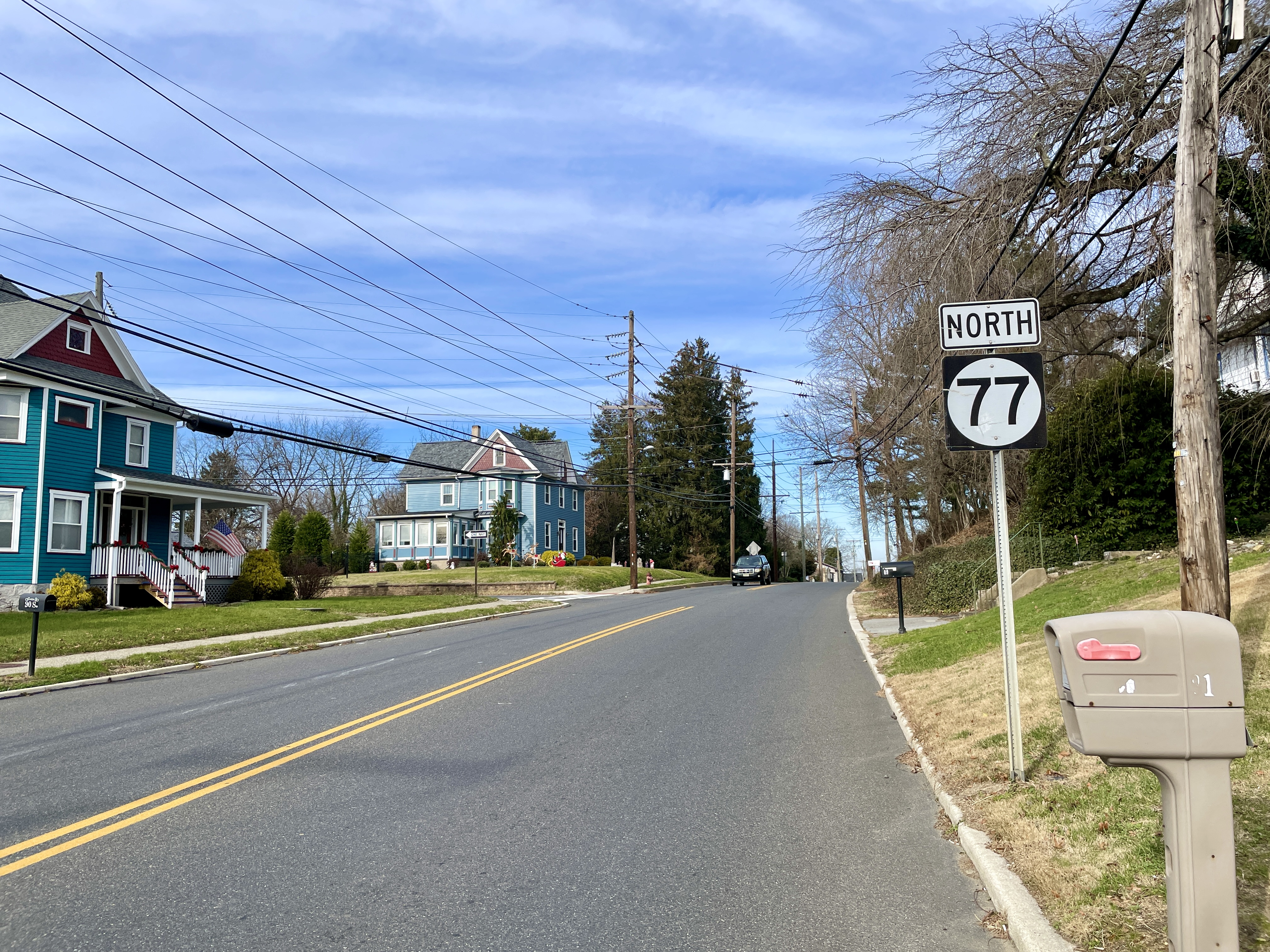
Route 77 northbound past CR 581 in Mullica Hill

Route 77 crosses into Upper Pittsgrove Township, Salem County, where it becomes Pole Tavern-Bridgeton Road, and crosses CR 611 in Shirley. It continues north through farms to Pole Tavern, where Route 77 meets US 40, CR 604, and CR 635 at Pole Tavern Circle. Past the Pole Tavern Circle, the route becomes Bridgeton Pike and crosses CR 660. Before leaving Salem County, Route 77 intersects two more county routes: CR 619 and CR 666.

Route 77 crosses Oldmans Creek into Elk Township, Gloucester County, meeting CR 641 and CR 616 before crossing CR 538. Past this junction, the route crosses CR 618 and enters Harrison Township. Route 77 continues northwest and enters Mullica Hill, where it intersects the northern terminus of CR 581 and heads north on South Main Street. Route 77 ends at Route 45, where Route 45 continues to the north on South Main Street.

== History ==
Route 46
- Location: Bridgeton–Mullica Hill
- Existed: 1927–1953

Sections of today's Route 77 appear on the earliest historical maps of southern New Jersey, and it may follow a Lenape trail known to early colonists as Cohawkin Road. Prior to 1927, the route was a branch of pre-1927 Route 6, which had run south from Camden and split into two branches in Mullica Hill that ran to Salem and Bridgeton. In the 1927 New Jersey state highway renumbering, Route 46 was designated along the former branch of pre-1927 Route 6 that ran from Bridgeton to Mullica Hill. In the 1953 New Jersey state highway renumbering, which stated that no state route and U.S. route could share the same number, Route 46 was changed to Route 77 to avoid a conflict with US 46 in North Jersey.

== Major intersections ==
County	Location	mi	km	Destinations	Notes
Cumberland	Bridgeton	0.00	0.00	Route 49 (Broad Street) – Millville, Salem	Southern terminus, continues as CR 609
Cumberland	Bridgeton	0.52	0.84	CR 552 (Irving Avenue)	
Cumberland	Upper Deerfield Township	2.79	4.49	Route 56 east (Landis Avenue) – Vineland	Western terminus of Route 56
Cumberland	Upper Deerfield Township	7.50	12.07	CR 540 (Deerfield Road) – Cohansey, Centerton	
Salem	Upper Pittsgrove Township	14.09	22.68	US 40 (Harding Highway)	Pole Tavern Circle
Gloucester	Elk Township	18.65	30.01	CR 538 (Elk Road) – Swedesboro, Franklinville, Atlantic City	
Gloucester	Harrison Township	22.34	35.95	CR 581 south (Commissioners Road) – Cedar Grove, Lincoln	Northern terminus of CR 581
Gloucester	Harrison Township	22.55	36.29	Route 45 (Woodstown Road/South Main Street) – Camden, Woodstown, Salem	Northern terminus
1.000 mi = 1.609 km; 1.000 km = 0.621 mi
