= County Route 581 (New Jersey) =

County highway in New Jersey, U.S.

County Route 581
- CR 581 highlighted in red

Route information
- Length: 17.57 mi (28.28 km)

Major junctions
- South end: Route 49 in Quinton Township
- CR 540 in Alloway Township; US 40 in Upper Pittsgrove Township; CR 538 in South Harrison Township
- North end: Route 77 in Mullica Hill

Location
- Country: United States
- State: New Jersey
- Counties: Salem, Gloucester

Highway system
- County routes in New Jersey; 500-series routes
| ← CR 579 | → CR 583 |

County Route 581 (CR 581) is a county highway in the U.S. state of New Jersey. The highway extends 17.57 miles (28.28 km) from Main Street (Route 49) in Quinton Township to Bridgeton Pike (Route 77) in Harrison Township.

== Route description ==
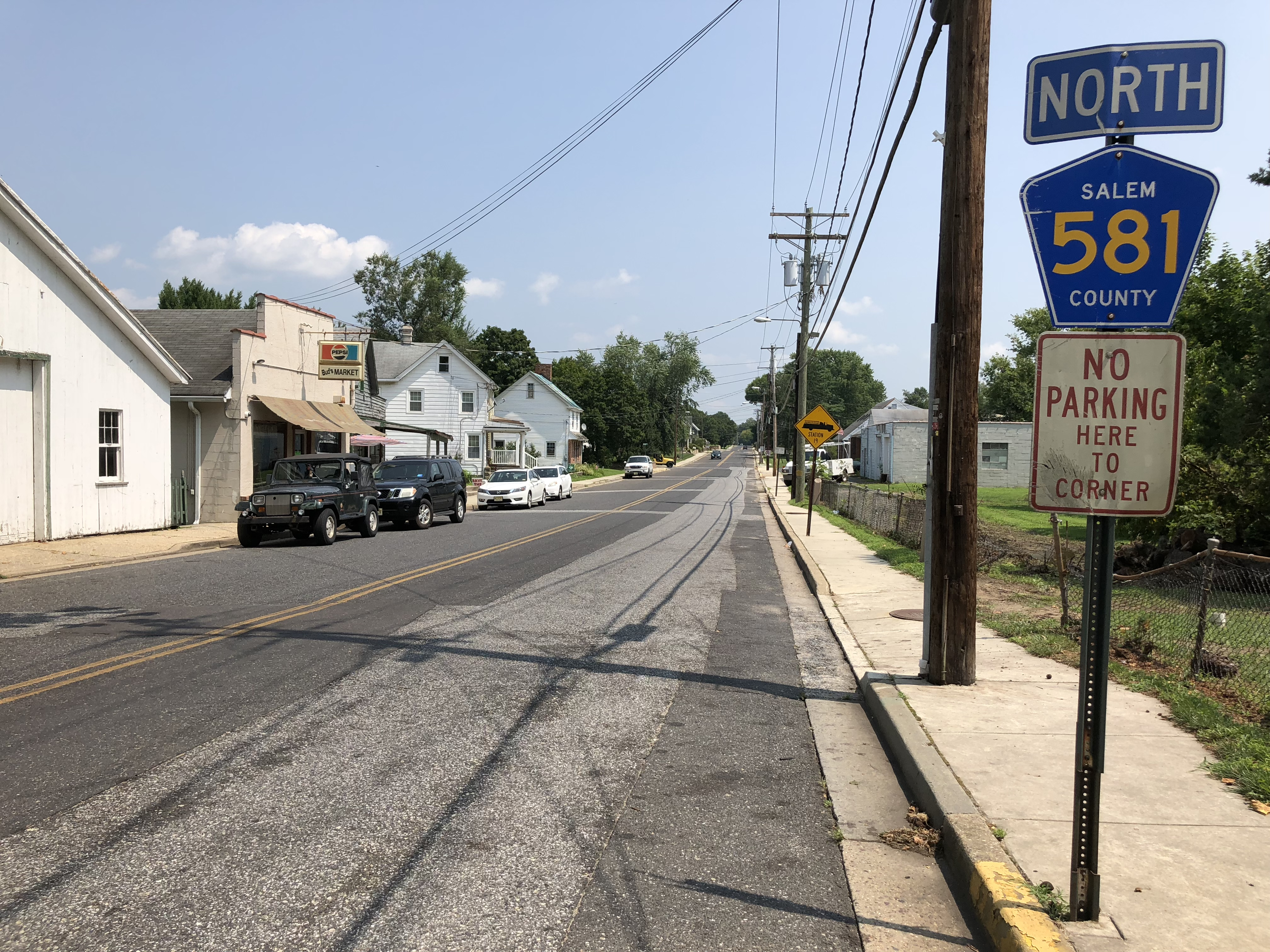
View north along CR 581 at CR 540 in Alloway Township

CR 581 begins at an intersection with Route 49 in Quinton Township, Salem County, heading east-northeast on two-lane undivided Alloway Road. The road runs through areas of farms and woods along with homes. The setting becomes more rural as the road continues east and crosses into Alloway Township. Residential development increases as the road runs through the community of Alloway and crosses CR 540. The route intersects CR 611 before becoming Commissioners Pike and making a turn northeast at Alloway Lake and intersecting CR 603. CR 581 enters rural areas with some homes again at this point and crosses CR 672 before entering Pilesgrove Township. Within Pilesgrove Township, the road has intersections with CR 614 and CR 615.

Crossing into Upper Pittsgrove Township, the route reaches the US 40 intersection. Continuing more to the north-northeast, CR 581 has junctions with CR 619 and CR 660. Upon crossing Oldmans Creek, the road continues into South Harrison Township in Gloucester County and intersects CR 694 and CR 538. Residential development increases past the intersection with the latter as the route enters Harrison Township. CR 581 comes to its northern terminus at an intersection with Route 77 in the community of Mullica Hill.

== History ==
The Commissioners' Pike used to be known as the Commissioners' Road. Due to its renaming, the road was likely maintained by the Mullica Hill and Pole Tavern Turnpike Company, chartered in 1851 to maintain a road from Mullica Hill to Daretown.

== Major intersections ==
| County | Location | mi | km | Destinations | Notes |
|---|---|---|---|---|---|
| Salem | Quinton Township | 0.00 | 0.00 | Route 49 (Main Street) – Bridgeton, Millville, Salem | Southern terminus |
| Salem | Alloway Township | 2.92 | 4.70 | CR 540 (Greenwich Street) – Welchville, Delaware Memorial Bridge, Shiloh, Bridgeton | |
| Salem | Upper Pittsgrove Township | 10.62 | 17.09 | US 40 – Woodstown, Malaga | |
| Gloucester | South Harrison Township | 15.70 | 25.27 | CR 538 (Swedesboro–Franklinville Road) | |
| Gloucester | Harrison Township | 17.57 | 28.28 | Route 77 (Bridgeton Pike) – Woodbury, Bridgeton | Northern terminus |
1.000 mi = 1.609 km; 1.000 km = 0.621 mi
