= Ferrell, New Jersey =

Populated place in Gloucester County, New Jersey, US

- Unincorporated community
- Ferrell's location in Gloucester County (Inset: Gloucester County in New Jersey) Ferrell (New Jersey) Ferrell (the United States)
- Coordinates: 39°40′31″N 75°11′56″W
- Country: United States
- state: New Jersey
- County: Gloucester
- Township: Elk
- Named after: Thomas M. Ferrell
- Elevation: 135 ft (41 m)
- ZIP Code: 08343
- GNIS feature ID: 0876326

Ferrell is an unincorporated community located within Elk Township, in Gloucester County, in the U.S. state of New Jersey. It was named after Thomas M. Ferrell of Glassboro, a well-known politician in the area. The community of Ferrell was originally known as Fairview, but was changed to its current name as soon as the post office was established, due to an already existing Fairview.
