= Elk Township, New Jersey =

Township in Gloucester County, New Jersey, US

- Township
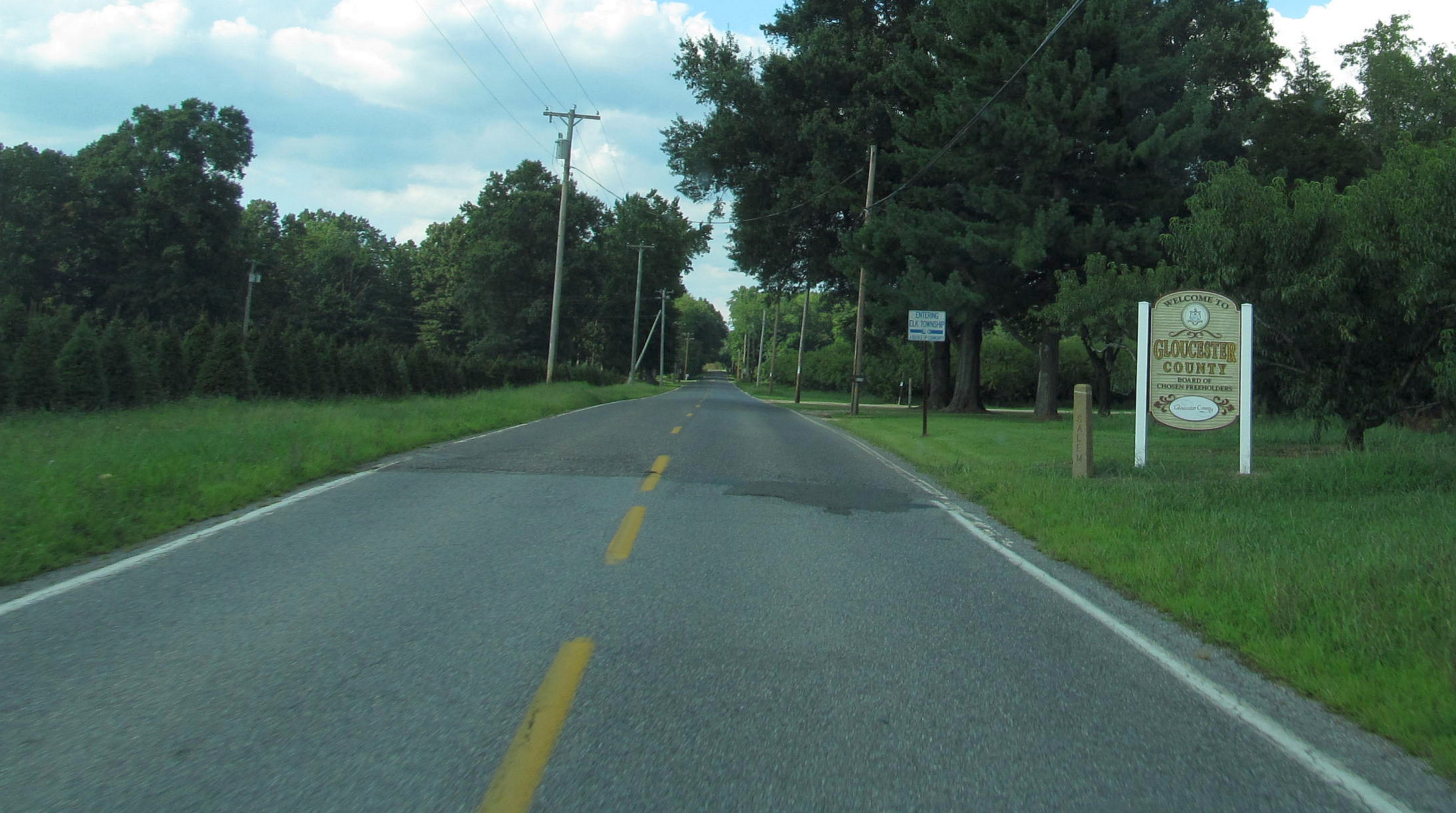
- Entering Elk Township along County Route 609

- Seal

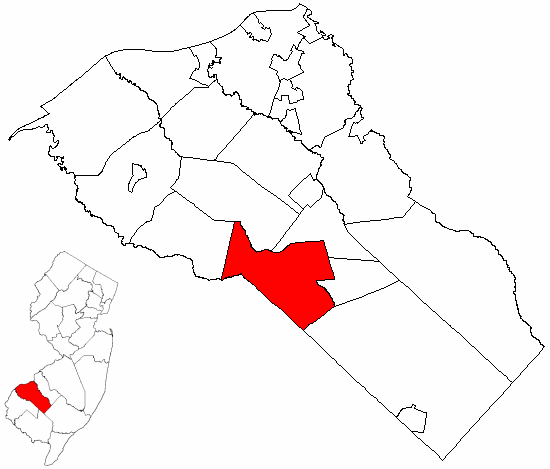
- Location of Elk Township in Gloucester County highlighted in red (right). Inset map: Location of Gloucester County in New Jersey highlighted in red (left).

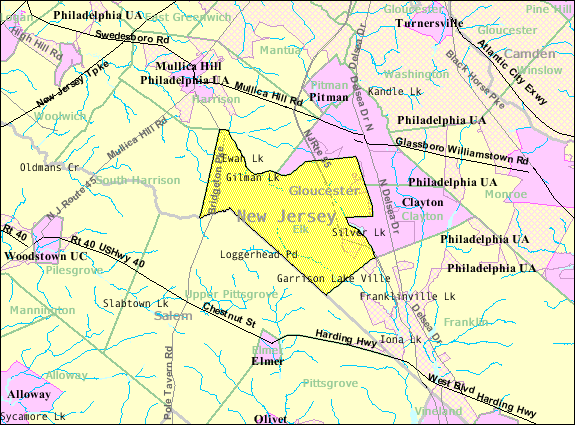
- Census Bureau map of Elk Township, New Jersey

- Location in Gloucester County Location in New Jersey Location in the United States
- Coordinates: 39.662752°N 75.156972°W
- Country: United States
- State: New Jersey
- County: Gloucester
- Incorporated: April 17, 1891

Government
  - Type: Township
  - Body: Township Committee
  - Mayor: Carolyn D. King-Sammons (R, term ends December 31, 2025)
  - Municipal clerk: Debbie Pine

Area
  - Total: 19.34 sq mi (50.08 km^{2})
  - Land: 19.15 sq mi (49.61 km^{2})
  - Water: 0.18 sq mi (0.47 km^{2}) 0.93%
  - Rank: 145th of 565 in state 6th of 24 in county
- Elevation: 144 ft (44 m)

Population (2020)
  - Total: 4,424
  - Estimate (2023): 4,473
  - Rank: 398th of 565 in state 17th of 24 in county
  - Density: 230.9/sq mi (89.2/km^{2})
  - Rank: 494th of 565 in state 23rd of 24 in county
- Time zone: UTC−05:00 (Eastern (EST))
  - Summer (DST): UTC−04:00 (Eastern (EDT))
- ZIP Code: 08343 – Monroeville
- Area code: 856
- FIPS code: 3401521060
- GNIS feature ID: 0882139
- Website: www.elktownshipnj.gov

Elk Township is a township in Gloucester County, in the U.S. state of New Jersey. As of the 2020 United States census, the township's population was 4,424, an increase of 208 (+4.9%) from the 2010 census count of 4,216, which in turn reflected an increase of 702 (+20.0%) from the 3,514 counted in the 2000 census.

Elk Township was formed as a township by an act of the New Jersey Legislature on April 17, 1891, from portions of Clayton Township, Glassboro Township, and South Harrison Township.} The township was named for elk hunted in the area.

Until 2016, Elk Township had been a dry township where alcohol could not be sold. That year, the township sold a package goods license for $300,000 which allows the sale of alcohol for off-premise consumption.

== Geography ==
According to the U.S. Census Bureau, the township had a total area of 19.34 square miles (50.08 km^{2}), including 19.16 square miles (49.61 km^{2}) of land and 0.18 square miles (0.47 km^{2}) of water (0.93%). Unincorporated communities, localities and place names located partially or completely within the township include Aura, Ferrell, Harding, Hardingville and Monroeville.

The township borders the municipalities of Clayton, Franklin Township, Glassboro, Harrison Township and South Harrison Township in Gloucester County; and Upper Pittsgrove Township in Salem County.

== Demographics ==
Historical population
Census	Pop.	Note	%±
1900	997		—
1910	1,022		2.5%
1920	951		−6.9%
1930	1,623		70.7%
1940	1,656		2.0%
1950	2,074		25.2%
1960	2,635		27.0%
1970	2,707		2.7%
1980	3,187		17.7%
1990	3,806		19.4%
2000	3,514		−7.7%
2010	4,216		20.0%
2020	4,424		4.9%
2023 (est.)	4,473		1.1%
Population sources: 1900–2000; 1900–1920 1900–1910; 1910–1930 1940–2000; 2000 2010 2020

=== 2010 census ===
The 2010 United States census counted 4,216 people, 1,474 households, and 1,117 families in the township. The population density was 216.3 inhabitants per square mile (83.5/km^{2}). There were 1,576 housing units at an average density of 80.8 per square mile (31.2/km^{2}). The racial makeup was 79.74% (3,362) White, 14.78% (623) Black or African American, 0.52% (22) Native American, 0.64% (27) Asian, 0.00% (0) Pacific Islander, 1.71% (72) from other races, and 2.61% (110) from two or more races. Hispanic or Latino of any race were 5.10% (215) of the population.

Of the 1,474 households, 30.3% had children under the age of 18; 59.1% were married couples living together; 11.3% had a female householder with no husband present and 24.2% were non-families. Of all households, 17.9% were made up of individuals and 8.3% had someone living alone who was 65 years of age or older. The average household size was 2.81 and the average family size was 3.20.

23.8% of the population were under the age of 18, 8.8% from 18 to 24, 24.8% from 25 to 44, 30.6% from 45 to 64, and 12.0% who were 65 years of age or older. The median age was 39.6 years. For every 100 females, the population had 95.9 males. For every 100 females ages 18 and older there were 96.8 males.

The Census Bureau's 2006–2010 American Community Survey showed that (in 2010 inflation-adjusted dollars) median household income was $63,194 (with a margin of error of +/− $18,724) and the median family income was $74,412 (+/− $15,399). Males had a median income of $56,786 (+/− $16,223) versus $39,900 (+/− $15,570) for females. The per capita income for the borough was $27,707 (+/− $3,616). About 9.3% of families and 11.3% of the population were below the poverty line, including 8.8% of those under age 18 and 9.2% of those age 65 or over.

=== 2000 census ===
As of the 2000 U.S. census, there were 3,514 people, 1,263 households, and 958 families residing in the township. The population density was 179.0 inhabitants per square mile (69.1/km^{2}). There were 1,347 housing units at an average density of 68.6 per square mile (26.5/km^{2}). The racial makeup of the township was 82.07% White, 14.26% African American, 0.57% Native American, 0.43% Asian, 1.37% from other races, and 1.31% from two or more races. Hispanic or Latino of any race were 2.93% of the population.

There were 1,263 households, out of which 33.8% had children under the age of 18 living with them, 59.9% were married couples living together, 11.4% had a female householder with no husband present, and 24.1% were non-families. 19.6% of all households were made up of individuals, and 8.9% had someone living alone who was 65 years of age or older. The average household size was 2.74 and the average family size was 3.16.

In the township, the population was spread out, with 27.2% under the age of 18, 6.9% from 18 to 24, 28.4% from 25 to 44, 24.9% from 45 to 64, and 12.6% who were 65 years of age or older. The median age was 38 years. For every 100 females, there were 96.1 males. For every 100 females age 18 and over, there were 92.6 males.

The median income for a household in the township was $51,047, and the median income for a family was $55,472. Males had a median income of $41,604 versus $27,407 for females. The per capita income for the township was $18,621. About 8.3% of families and 8.5% of the population were below the poverty line, including 6.4% of those under age 18 and 15.7% of those age 65 or over.

== Government ==
=== Local government ===
Elk Township is governed under the Township form of New Jersey municipal government, one of 141 of the 564 municipalities statewide that use this form, the second-most commonly used form of government in the state. The Township Committee is comprised of five members, who are elected directly by the voters at-large in partisan elections to serve three-year terms of office on a staggered basis, with either one or two seats coming up for election each year as part of the November general election in a three-year cycle. At an annual reorganization meeting, the Township Committee selects one of its members to serve as Mayor and another as Deputy Mayor.

As of 2025, the members of the Elk Township Committee are Mayor Carolyn King-Sammons (R, term on committee ends December 31, 2026; term as mayor ends 2025), Antonio Cammarata (R, 2027), Christine "Chrisy" Cowan (R, 2027), Nathaniel G. Lucas III (R, 2025) and James Rambo (R, 2026).

After the November 2014 general election, Elk Township Republicans declined to file for a recount with John J. Norris coming in third place (with 672 votes), six votes behind Republican Carolyn D. King-Sammons (678) and Democrat James Rambo (685).

=== Federal, state and county representation ===
Elk Township is located in the 2nd Congressional District and is part of New Jersey's 3rd state legislative district.

For the 119th United States Congress, New Jersey's 2nd congressional district is represented by Jeff Van Drew (R, Dennis Township). New Jersey is represented in the United States Senate by Democrats Cory Booker (Newark, term ends 2027) and Andy Kim (Moorestown, term ends 2031).

For the 2026–2027 session, the 3rd legislative district of the New Jersey Legislature is represented in the State Senate by John Burzichelli (D, Paulsboro) and in the General Assembly by David Bailey (D, Woodstown) and Heather Simmons (D, Glassboro).

Gloucester County is governed by a board of county commissioners, whose seven members are elected at-large to three-year terms of office on a staggered basis in partisan elections, with either two or three seats coming up for election each year. At a reorganization meeting held each January, the Board selects a Director and a Deputy Director from among its members. As of 2025, Gloucester County's Commissioners are:

Director Frank J. DiMarco (D, Deptford Township, 2025), Matt Weng (D, Pitman, 2026), Joann Gattinelli (D, Washington Township, 2026), Nicholas DeSilvio (R, Franklin Township, 2027), Denice DiCarlo (D, West Deptford Township, 2025) Deputy Director Jim Jefferson (D, Woodbury, 2026) and Christopher Konawel Jr. (R, Glassboro, 2027).

Gloucester County's constitutional officers are: Clerk James N. Hogan (D, Franklin Township; 2027), Sheriff Carmel Morina (D, Greenwich Township; 2027) and Surrogate Giuseppe "Joe" Chila (D, Woolwich Township; 2028).

=== Politics ===
United States presidential election results for Elk Township 2024 2020 2016 2012 2008 2004
Year	Republican		Democratic		Third party(ies)	
Year	No.	%	No.	%	No.	%
2024	1,506	58.83%	1,010	39.45%	44	1.72%
2020	1,482	56.29%	1,118	42.46%	33	1.25%
2016	1,183	55.31%	879	41.09%	77	3.60%
2012	1,039	47.64%	1,116	51.17%	26	1.19%
2008	1,080	47.12%	1,187	51.79%	25	1.09%
2004	1,016	51.18%	955	48.11%	14	0.71%

As of March 2011, there were a total of 3,005 registered voters in Elk, of which 1,031 (34.3%) were registered as Democrats, 604 (20.1%) were registered as Republicans and 1,369 (45.6%) were registered as Unaffiliated. There was one voter registered to another party.

In the 2012 presidential election, Democrat Barack Obama received 51.2% of the vote (1,116 cast), ahead of Republican Mitt Romney with 47.6% (1,039 votes), and other candidates with 1.2% (26 votes), among the 2,201 ballots cast by the township's 3,208 registered voters (20 ballots were spoiled), for a turnout of 68.6%. In the 2008 presidential election, Democrat Barack Obama received 51.3% of the vote (1,187 cast), ahead of Republican John McCain with 46.7% (1,080 votes) and other candidates with 1.1% (25 votes), among the 2,312 ballots cast by the township's 3,204 registered voters, for a turnout of 72.2%. In the 2004 presidential election, Republican George W. Bush received 50.9% of the vote (1,016 ballots cast), outpolling Democrat John Kerry with 47.8% (955 votes) and other candidates with 0.5% (14 votes), among the 1,997 ballots cast by the township's 2,727 registered voters, for a turnout percentage of 73.2.

Gubernatorial election results for Elk Township
Year	Republican		Democratic		Third party(ies)	
Year	No.	%	No.	%	No.	%
2025	1,158	56.38%	883	42.99%	13	0.63%
2021	1,085	62.86%	626	36.27%	15	0.87%
2017	662	51.20%	589	45.55%	42	3.25%
2013	962	65.71%	484	33.06%	18	1.23%
2009	784	51.75%	607	40.07%	124	8.18%
2005	721	48.72%	686	46.35%	73	4.93%

In the 2013 gubernatorial election, Republican Chris Christie received 65.7% of the vote (962 cast), ahead of Democrat Barbara Buono with 33.1% (484 votes), and other candidates with 1.2% (18 votes), among the 1,503 ballots cast by the township's 3,083 registered voters (39 ballots were spoiled), for a turnout of 48.8%. In the 2009 gubernatorial election, Republican Chris Christie received 50.7% of the vote (784 ballots cast), ahead of Democrat Jon Corzine with 39.2% (607 votes), Independent Chris Daggett with 7.2% (112 votes) and other candidates with 0.8% (12 votes), among the 1,547 ballots cast by the township's 3,105 registered voters, yielding a 49.8% turnout.

United States Senate election results for Elk Township1
Year	Republican		Democratic		Third party(ies)	
Year	No.	%	No.	%	No.	%
2024	1,447	57.93%	1,030	41.23%	21	0.84%
2018	1,032	58.04%	681	38.30%	65	3.66%
2012	926	44.01%	1,135	53.94%	43	2.04%
2006	729	48.09%	736	48.55%	51	3.36%

United States Senate election results for Elk Township2
Year	Republican		Democratic		Third party(ies)	
Year	No.	%	No.	%	No.	%
2020	1,436	55.38%	1,113	42.92%	44	1.70%
2014	645	50.16%	611	47.51%	30	2.33%
2013	458	54.39%	373	44.30%	11	1.31%
2008	983	45.24%	1,136	52.28%	54	2.49%

== Education ==
The Elk Township School District serves students in public school for pre-kindergarten through sixth grade at Aura School. As of the 2022–23 school year, the district, comprised of one school, had an enrollment of 336 students and 32.6 classroom teachers (on an FTE basis), for a student–teacher ratio of 10.3:1. Aura School was built in 1927 and rededicated in 1949 after a fire the previous year, with the newest addition built in 2002.

For seventh through twelfth grades, public school students attend the Delsea Regional School District, which serves students from both Elk Township and Franklin Township. Students from Newfield attend the district's schools as part of a sending/receiving relationship begun in September 2010 after Newfield ended its prior relationship with the Buena Regional School District. Schools in the district (with 2022–23 enrollment data from the National Center for Education Statistics) are Delsea Regional Middle School with 518 students in grades 7-8 and Delsea Regional High School with 1,074 students in grades 9-12. The seats on the high school district's nine-member board of education are allocated to the constituent municipalities based on population, with two seats assigned to Elk Township.

The New Jersey Department of Education considered a vote by the Board of Education of the Franklin Township Public Schools in June 2010, requesting that the district withdraw from the Delsea Regional School District, which would require that the Delsea region be dissolved since about 80% of the regional district's students come from Franklin. With the withdrawal of Franklin Township, two options considered were to either have Franklin and Elk Townships create a new regional district with Newfield students attending on a send-receive basis, or having Franklin Township establish its own Pre-K–12 district which would receive students from both Elk Township and Newfield.

Students from across the county are eligible to apply to attend Gloucester County Institute of Technology, a four-year high school in Deptford Township that provides technical and vocational education. As a public school, students do not pay tuition to attend the school.

== Transportation ==
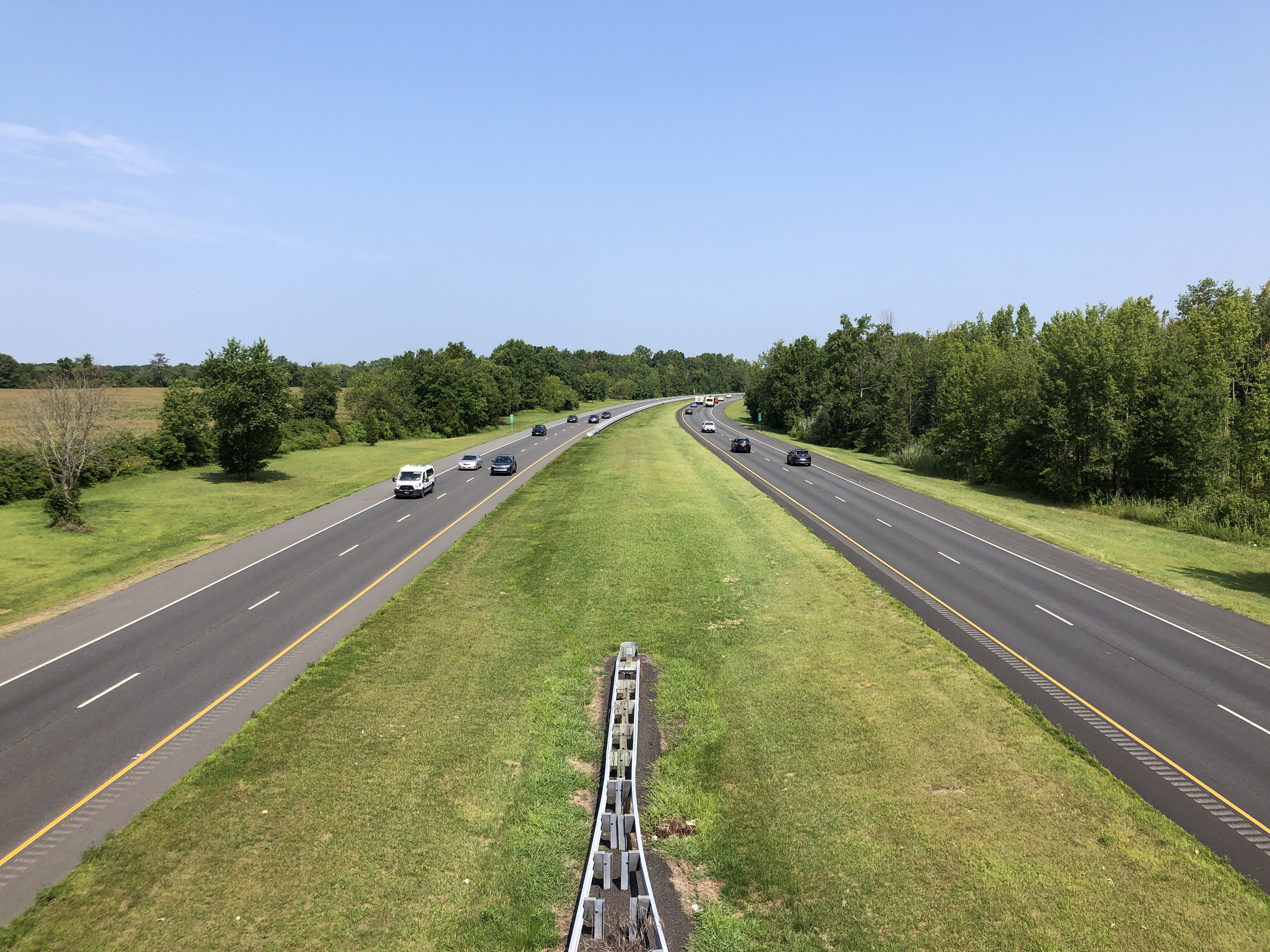
Route 55 northbound in Elk Township

=== Roads and highways ===
As of May 2010, the township had a total of 66.75 miles (107.42 km) of roadways, of which 26.51 miles (42.66 km) were maintained by the municipality, 32.61 miles (52.48 km) by Gloucester County and 7.63 miles (12.28 km) by the New Jersey Department of Transportation.

Major state routes that pass through include Route 77 and the limited access Route 55. The two main county routes that are accessible include County Route 538 and County Route 553. The New Jersey Turnpike passes through in neighboring Harrison Township with an exit two towns away.

=== Public transportation ===
NJ Transit offers bus service on the 410 route between Bridgeton and Philadelphia.

== Notable people ==
People who were born in, residents of, or otherwise closely associated with Elk Township include:

- Sean F. Dalton (born 1962), politician who served as the prosecutor of Gloucester County and served two terms in the New Jersey General Assembly, where he represented the 4th Legislative District
