= Pittsgrove Presbyterian Church =

Historic church in New Jersey, United States

- U.S. National Register of Historic Places
- New Jersey Register of Historic Places
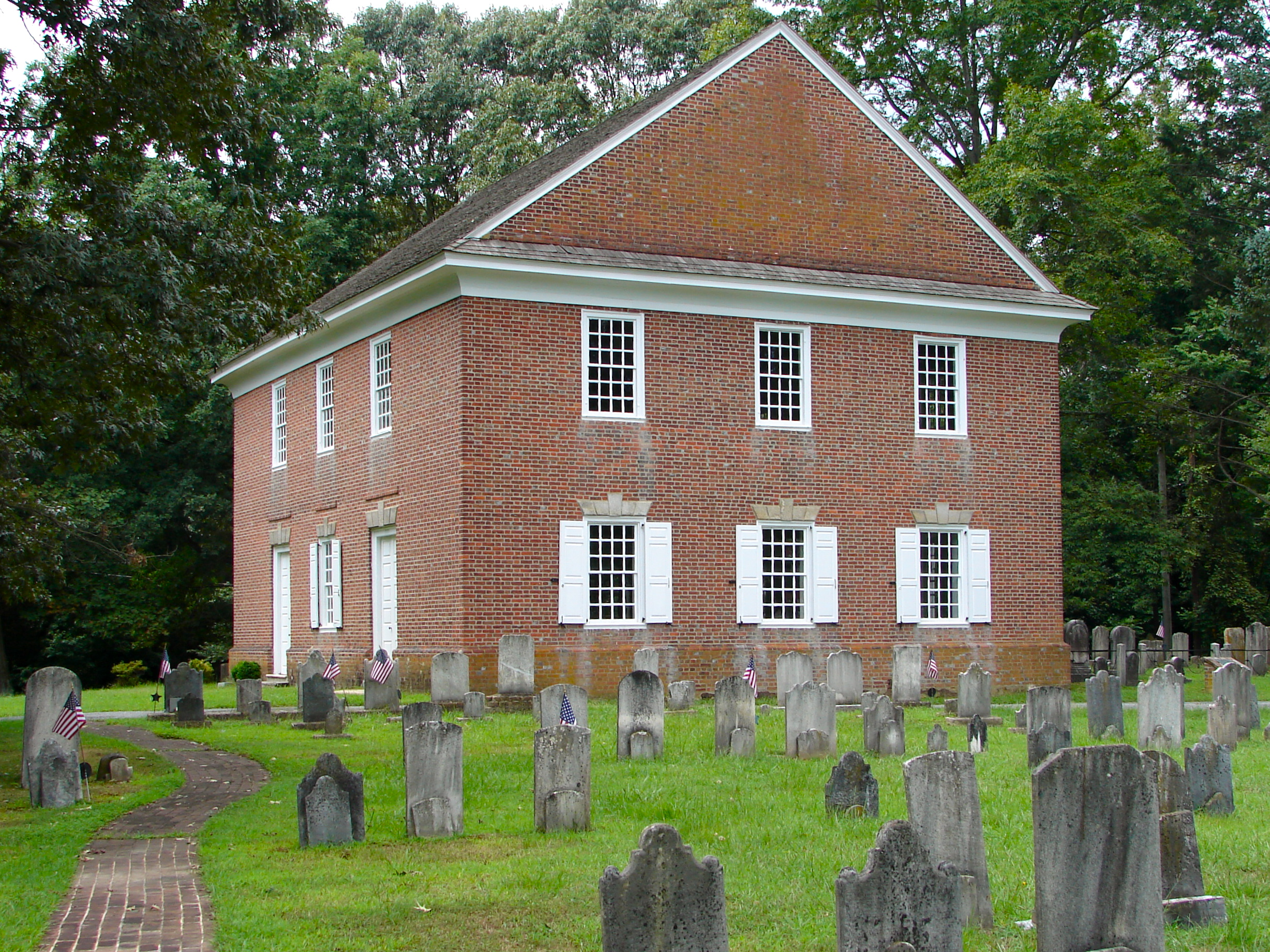

- Location within Salem County, New Jersey Location within New Jersey Location within the United States
- Location: Main Street (also called Daretown Road), Upper Pittsgrove Township, New Jersey
- Coordinates: 39°36′4″N 75°15′38″W
- Area: less than one acre
- Built: 1767
- Architectural style: Romanesque, Italian Romanesque
- NRHP reference No.: 77000904
- NJRHP No.: 2452
- Added to NRHP: September 19, 1977

Pittsgrove Presbyterian Church is a historic church on Main Street (also called Daretown Road) in the Daretown neighborhood of Upper Pittsgrove Township, Salem County, New Jersey, United States.

It was built in 1767 and added to the National Register of Historic Places in 1977.

== See also ==
- National Register of Historic Places listings in Salem County, New Jersey
