= New Jersey Route 56 =

State highway in southern New Jersey, US

Route 56
- Landis Avenue

Route information
- Maintained by NJDOT and City of Vineland
- Length: 9.19 mi (14.79 km)
- Existed: October 1983–present

Major junctions
- West end: Route 77 in Upper Deerfield Township
- CR 553 in Upper Deerfield Township; Route 55 in Vineland
- East end: Route 47 in Vineland

Location
- Country: United States
- State: New Jersey
- Counties: Cumberland, Salem

Highway system
- New Jersey State Highway Routes; Interstate; US; State; Scenic Byways
← Route 55	→ Route 57

Route 56 is a state highway in the southern part of the U.S. state of New Jersey. Also known as Landis Avenue, it runs 9.19 mi (14.79 km) from an intersection with Route 77 and County Route 622 (CR 622) in Upper Deerfield Township, Cumberland County, to an intersection with Route 47 (Delsea Drive) in Vineland, Cumberland County. The route serves as a connector between Bridgeton and Vineland. West of the interchange with Route 55 in Vineland, Route 56 is a two-lane undivided road that passes through rural areas of Cumberland County, also entering a corner of Salem County. East of Route 55, the route is a four-lane locally maintained road that runs through commercial areas of Vineland.

The portion of current Route 56 in Vineland was built as a 100-foot (30 m) wide road when Vineland was planned in the 1860s, serving as the main east–west road through the community. In the past, the Route 56 number was used twice for a never-built road between the Laurelton Circle and Mantoloking in Ocean County legislated in 1938 and for the portion of U.S. Route 30 between current Route 157 and Atlantic City between 1938 and 1953. The current iteration of Route 56 was legislated in 1977 to run from Route 77 north of Bridgeton to Route 47 in Vineland, replacing County Route 22 between Route 77 and the Salem County border, County Route 6 within Salem County, and County Route 23 between the Salem County border and Route 47. This portion of road was designated as Route 56 in October 1983. In 2007, two bridges along the route were replaced. The Rainbow Lake Bridge in Pittsgrove Township was rebuilt after it was washed out by the April 2007 Nor'easter while the Maurice River bridge was reconstructed to make it wider and higher.

== Route description ==
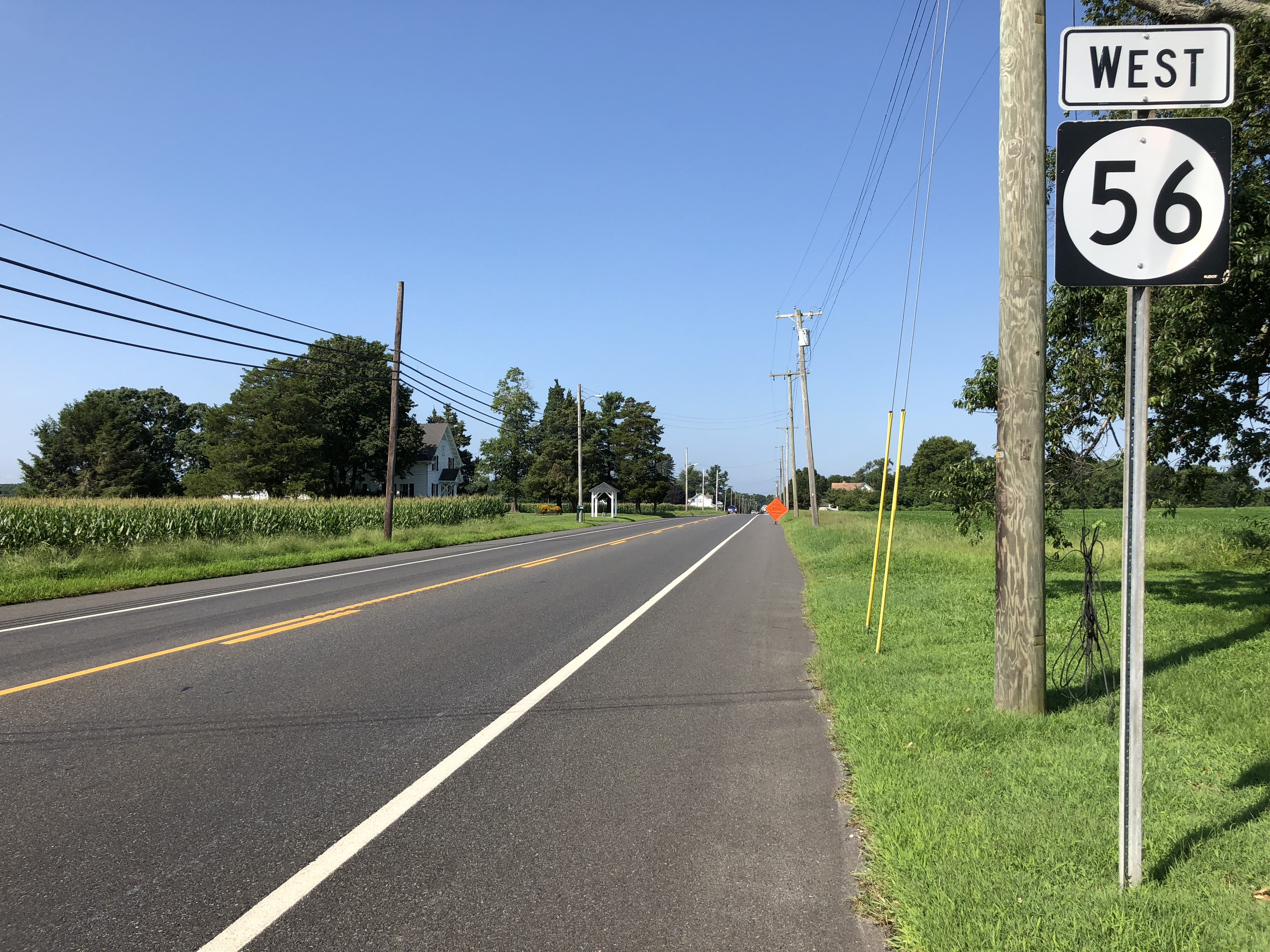
View west along Route 56 at CR 553 in Upper Deerfield Township

Route 56 begins at Route 77 and CR 622 in Upper Deerfield Township, Cumberland County, a short distance north of Bridgeton. From this intersection, the route heads to the northeast as two-lane undivided Landis Avenue. Shortly after it begins, it passes businesses and intersects CR 611. From here, Route 56 turns to the east-northeast and passes a mix of residences and farm fields. The route comes to a five-way junction with CR 553 and CR 687 before intersecting County Route 645. The road heads into Deerfield Township, coming to a junction with CR 686. Past this intersection, Route 56 continues toward the community of Rosenhayn. Here, the road intersects CR 737 before running past homes and crossing CR 634, where there are some businesses along the road. A short distance later, the route intersects CR 717, where it crosses into Pittsgrove Township in Salem County.

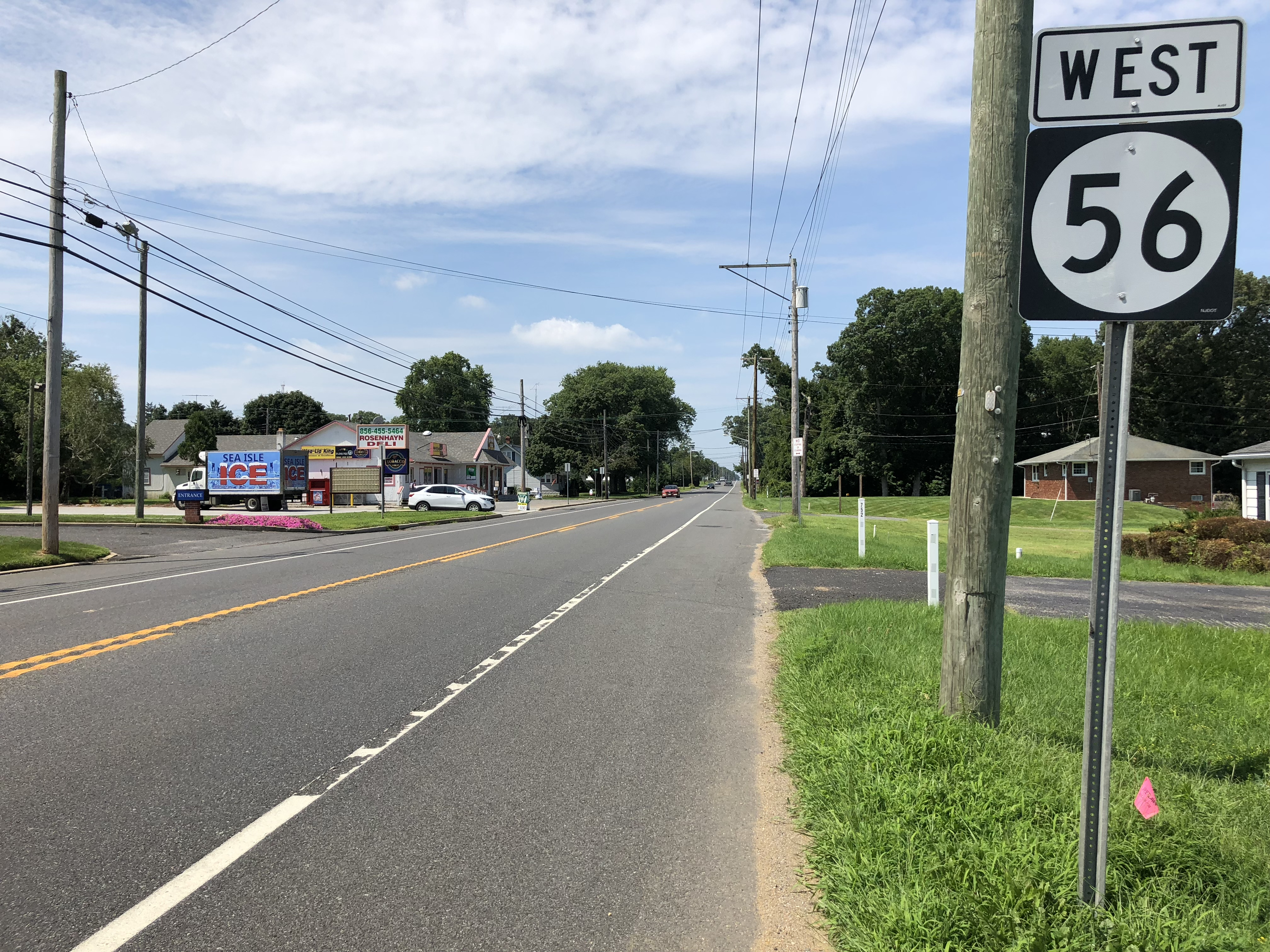
Route 56 westbound past the CR 634 intersection in Deerfield Township

Route 56 heads through a mix of farms and woodland, passing to the south of Rainbow Lake. Past the lake, the road turns to the east and continues into agricultural areas and intersects CR 655. Traveling eastward, the road crosses CR 638 and a Winchester and Western Railroad line at-grade. The route heads into forested areas, where it passes over the Maurice River into Vineland in Cumberland County. Here, it widens into a four-lane divided highway and comes to a cloverleaf interchange with Route 55. Past this interchange, Route 56 becomes a four-lane undivided road that is locally maintained. The route heads through commercial sectors of Vineland before coming to a crossroads with CR 628. The route continues past more inhabited areas and businesses before reaching its end at Route 47 (Delsea Drive). From here, Landis Avenue continues to the east toward the downtown area of Vineland.

== History ==
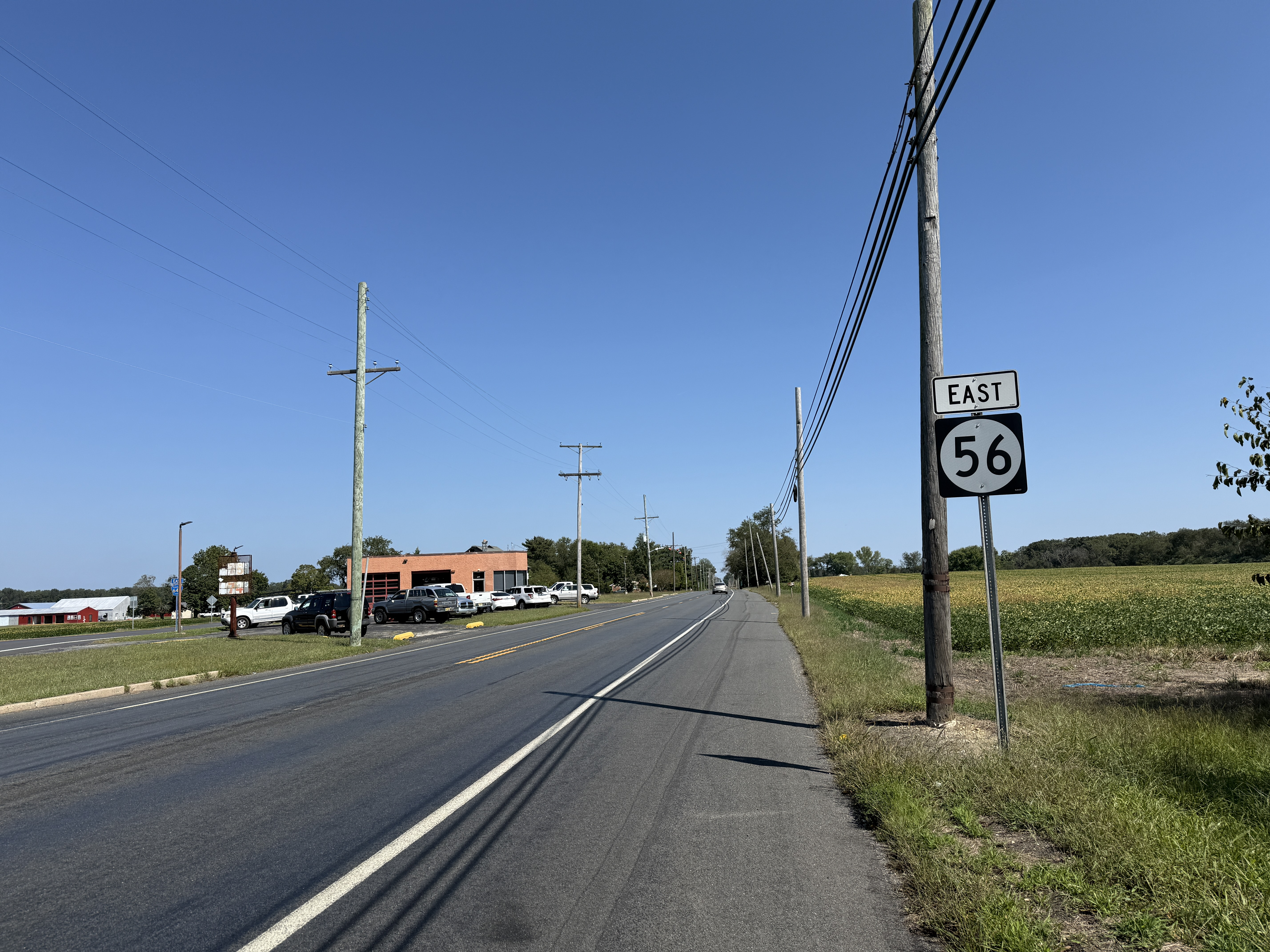
Route 56 eastbound past CR 645 in Upper Deerfield Township

The portion of Route 56 in Vineland was built as a 100-foot (30 m) wide road when Vineland was planned in the 1860s, serving as the main east–west road through the community. In 1938, two separate roads numbered Route 56 were legislated. One was located in Ocean County and was to run from the Laurelton Circle east to Mantoloking; this road was never built. The other was located in the Atlantic City area along U.S. Route 30 (Absecon Boulevard) east of current Route 157; the Route 56 designation on this road was dropped in the 1953 New Jersey state highway renumbering. What is modern-day Route 56 was originally designated as County Route 22 between Route 77 and the Salem County border, County Route 6 in Salem County, and County Route 23 between the Salem County border and Route 47. In 1977, Route 56 was legislated onto its current alignment between Route 77 in Upper Deerfield Township and Route 47 in Vineland, replacing County Routes 6, 22, and 23. The route was designated in October 1983.

Due to the April 2007 Nor'easter, the Rainbow Lake Bridge in Pittsgrove Township was washed out and the New Jersey Department of Transportation had to replace it with a new bridge. This closure led to detours for traffic traveling between Vineland and Bridgeton. The new Rainbow Lake Bridge was opened in November 2007. The bridge spanning the Maurice River, which connects Vineland and Pittsgrove Township, was closed in July 2007 for planned repairs. This bridge replacement, which was completed in December 2007, cost $5 million and provided a wider and higher crossing of the river.

== Major intersections ==
County	Location	mi	km	Destinations	Notes
Cumberland	Upper Deerfield Township	0.00	0.00	Route 77 – Bridgeton, Mullica Hill	Western terminus
Cumberland	Upper Deerfield Township	1.25	2.01	CR 553 (Finley Road/South Woodruff Road) – Centerton, Port Norris	
Salem	No major junctions				
Cumberland	Vineland	7.69	12.38	Route 55	Route 55 exit 32
Cumberland	Vineland	9.19	14.79	Route 47 (Delsea Drive)	Eastern terminus
1.000 mi = 1.609 km; 1.000 km = 0.621 mi
