= Daretown, New Jersey =

Populated place in Salem County, New Jersey, US

- Unincorporated community
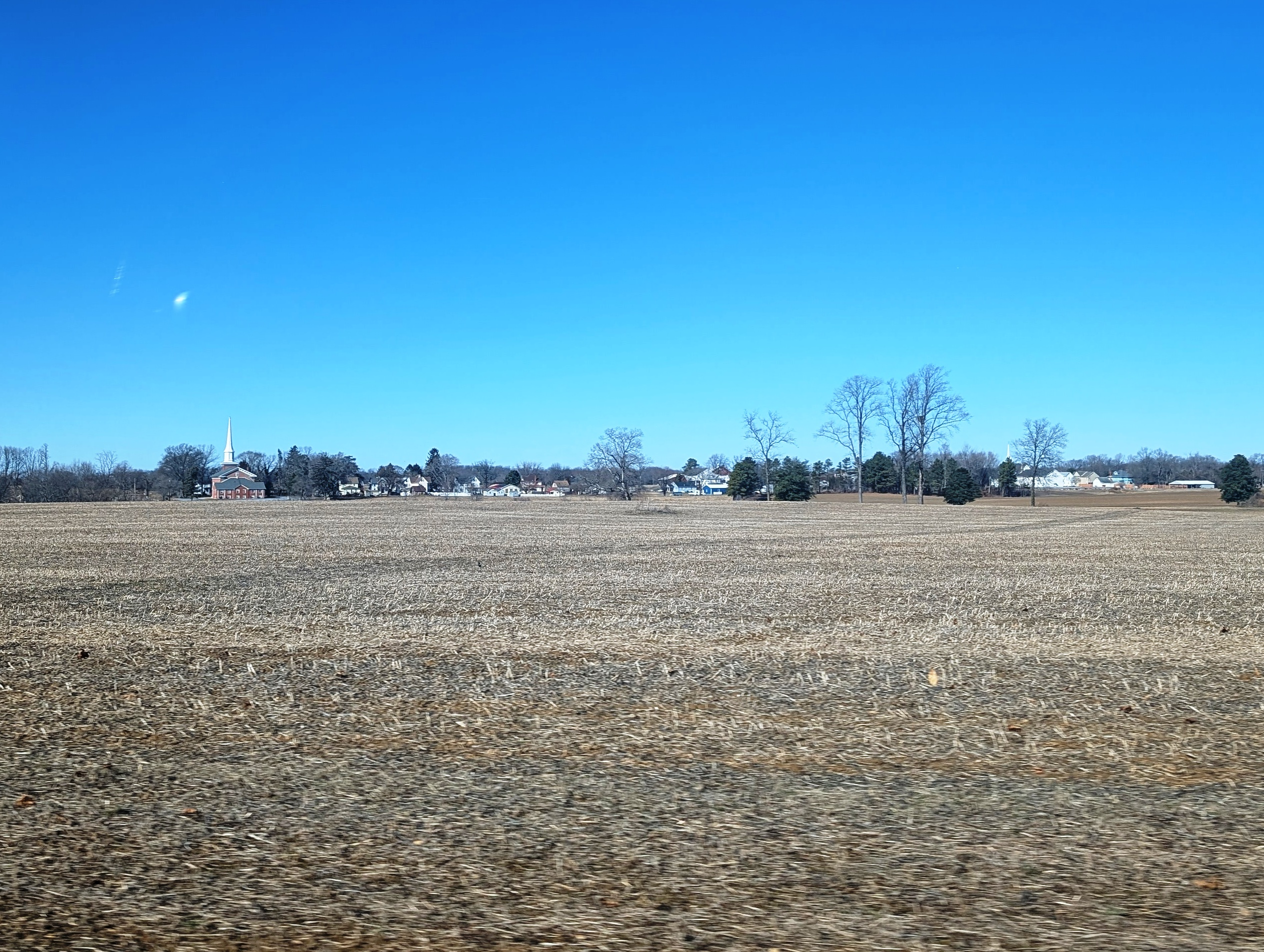
- Wide view of Daretown from Newkirk Station Road

- Location within Salem County, New Jersey Location within New Jersey Location within the United States
- Coordinates: 39°36′15″N 75°15′27″W
- Country: United States
- State: New Jersey
- County: Salem
- Township: Upper Pittsgrove
- Named for: Samuel Dare
- Elevation: 135 ft (41 m)
- Time zone: UTC−05:00 (Eastern (EST))
  - Summer (DST): UTC−04:00 (EDT)
- GNIS feature ID: 875799

Daretown is an unincorporated community within Upper Pittsgrove Township in Salem County, in the U.S. state of New Jersey.

Alloway Creek flows south of Daretown, while the Salem River flows to the north.

== History ==
An early settler, Samuel Dare, opened a store in his house there, and also served as a church trustee. The settlement was named in his honor following his death in 1838.

The historic Pittsgrove Baptist Church is located in Daretown, while the historic Pittsgrove Presbyterian Church is located southwest of Daretown.

A depot of the Salem Railroad was erected in Daretown in 1863. The depot also served as the first post office. Daretown was a center for potato shipping from 1906 to 1923.

A school was erected in 1876.

By 1882, the population had grown to 250.
