= South Harrison Township, New Jersey =

Township in Gloucester County, New Jersey, US

- Township
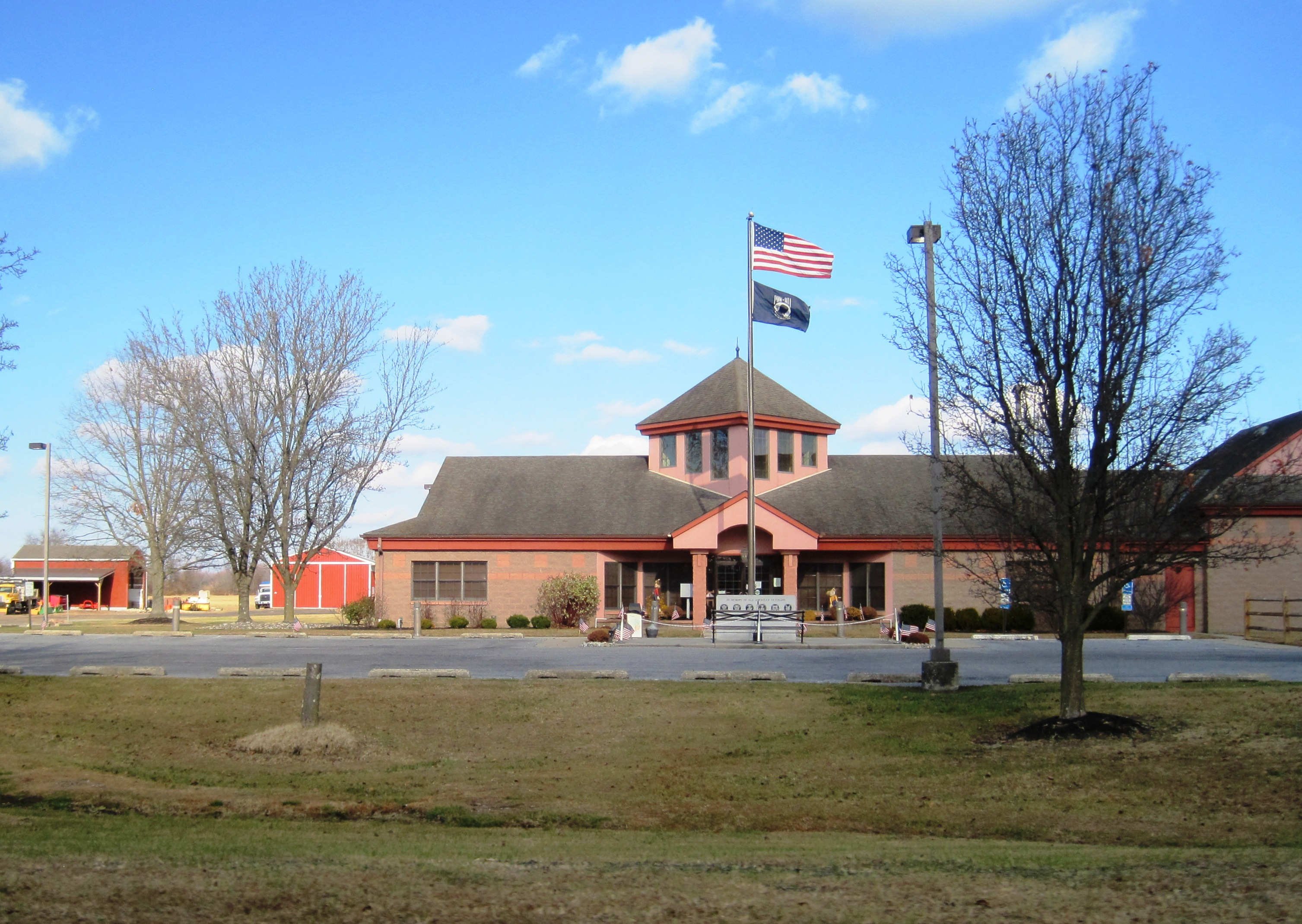
- South Harrison Township municipal building

- Seal

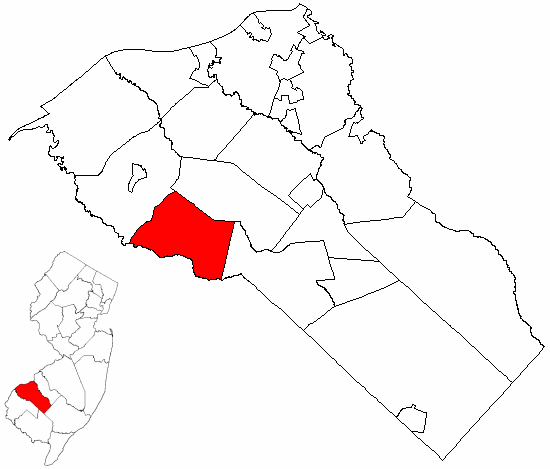
- South Harrison Township highlighted in Gloucester County. Inset map: Gloucester County highlighted in New Jersey.

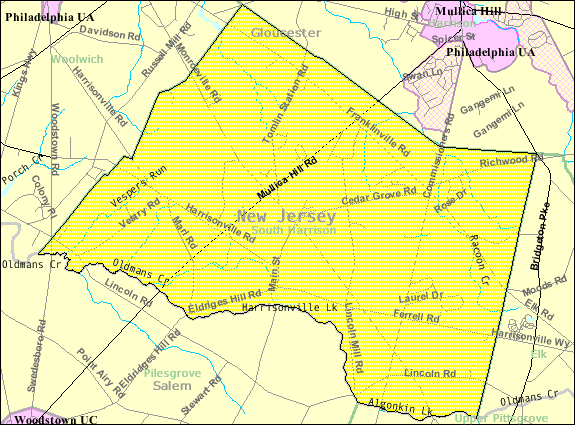
- Census Bureau map of South Harrison Township, New Jersey

- Location in Gloucester County Location in New Jersey Location in the United States
- Coordinates: 39.693596°N 75.253779°W
- Country: United States
- State: New Jersey
- County: Gloucester
- Incorporated: March 2, 1883

Government
  - Type: Township
  - Body: Township Committee
  - Mayor: Joseph Marino (R, term ends December 31, 2025)
  - Municipal clerk: Lindsey Kranz

Area
  - Total: 15.95 sq mi (41.32 km^{2})
  - Land: 15.90 sq mi (41.17 km^{2})
  - Water: 0.058 sq mi (0.15 km^{2}) 0.38%
  - Rank: 170th of 565 in state 11th of 24 in county
- Elevation: 118 ft (36 m)

Population (2020)
  - Total: 3,395
  - Estimate (2023): 3,444
  - Rank: 431st of 565 in state 19th of 24 in county
  - Density: 213.6/sq mi (82.5/km^{2})
  - Rank: 500th of 565 in state 24th of 24 in county
- Time zone: UTC−05:00 (Eastern (EST))
  - Summer (DST): UTC−04:00 (Eastern (EDT))
- ZIP Code: 08039 – Harrisonville
- Area code: 856
- FIPS code: 3401569030
- GNIS feature ID: 0882145
- Website: www.southharrison-nj.org

South Harrison Township is a township in Gloucester County, in the U.S. state of New Jersey. As of the 2020 United States census, the township's population was 3,395, an increase of 233 (+7.4%) from the 2010 census count of 3,162, which in turn reflected an increase of 745 (+30.8%) from the 2,417 counted in the 2000 census.

South Harrison was formed as a township by an act of the New Jersey Legislature on March 2, 1883, from portions of Harrison Township. Elk Township was formed from portions of South Harrison Township on April 17, 1891. It is a dry town, where alcohol cannot be sold, though alcohol is available at the winery in the township.

== Geography ==
According to the U.S. Census Bureau, the township had a total area of 15.96 square miles (41.32 km^{2}), including 15.90 square miles (41.17 km^{2}) of land and 0.06 square miles (0.15 km^{2}) of water (0.38%).

Unincorporated communities, localities, and places located partially or completely within the township include Cedar Grove, Harrisonville (served as ZIP Code 08039), Jessups Mills, and Lincoln.

The township borders the municipalities of Elk Township, Harrison Township, and Woolwich Township in Gloucester County; and Pilesgrove Township and Upper Pittsgrove Township in Salem County.

== Demographics ==
Historical population
Census	Pop.	Note	%±
1890	971		—
1900	706	*	−27.3%
1910	694		−1.7%
1920	583		−16.0%
1930	680		16.6%
1940	686		0.9%
1950	868		26.5%
1960	974		12.2%
1970	1,226		25.9%
1980	1,486		21.2%
1990	1,919		29.1%
2000	2,417		26.0%
2010	3,162		30.8%
2020	3,395		7.4%
2023 (est.)	3,444		1.4%
Population sources: 1890–2000; 1890–1920 1890 1890–1910; 1910–1930 1940–2000; 2000 2010 2020 * = Lost territory in previous decade.

=== 2010 census ===
The 2010 United States census counted 3,162 people, 1,020 households, and 862 families in the township. The population density was 201.7 inhabitants per square mile (77.9/km^{2}). There were 1,056 housing units at an average density of 67.4 per square mile (26.0/km^{2}). The racial makeup was 91.59% (2,896) White, 5.06% (160) Black or African American, 0.00% (0) Native American, 1.20% (38) Asian, 0.03% (1) Pacific Islander, 0.95% (30) from other races, and 1.17% (37) from two or more races. Hispanic or Latino of any race were 3.10% (98) of the population.

Of the 1,020 households, 42.1% had children under the age of 18; 73.1% were married couples living together; 7.6% had a female householder with no husband present and 15.5% were non-families. Of all households, 11.5% were made up of individuals and 4.8% had someone living alone who was 65 years of age or older. The average household size was 3.10 and the average family size was 3.36.

28.7% of the population were under the age of 18, 6.3% from 18 to 24, 24.0% from 25 to 44, 30.6% from 45 to 64, and 10.4% who were 65 years of age or older. The median age was 40.4 years. For every 100 females, the population had 95.8 males. For every 100 females ages 18 and older there were 97.5 males.

The Census Bureau's 2006–2010 American Community Survey showed that (in 2010 inflation-adjusted dollars) median household income was $106,667 (with a margin of error of +/− $12,029) and the median family income was $113,875 (+/− $14,397). Males had a median income of $84,408 (+/− $4,334) versus $55,750 (+/− $10,554) for females. The per capita income for the borough was $34,515 (+/− $3,976). About 2.0% of families and 10.4% of the population were below the poverty line, including 3.8% of those under age 18 and 8.1% of those age 65 or over.

=== 2000 census ===
As of the 2000 census, there were 2,417 people, 800 households, and 663 families residing in the township. The population density was 153.0 inhabitants per square mile (59.1/km^{2}). There were 829 housing units at an average density of 52.5 per square mile (20.3/km^{2}). The racial makeup of the township was 93.09% White, 3.76% African American, 0.04% Native American, 0.29% Asian, 0.04% Pacific Islander, 2.19% from other races, and 0.58% from two or more races. Hispanic or Latino of any race were 3.43% of the population.

There were 800 households, out of which 41.1% had children under the age of 18 living with them, 71.9% were married couples living together, 7.8% had a female householder with no husband present, and 17.1% were non-families. 13.4% of all households were made up of individuals, and 5.0% had someone living alone who was 65 years of age or older. The average household size was 2.94 and the average family size was 3.25.

In the township, the population was spread out, with 26.9% under the age of 18, 7.1% from 18 to 24, 28.9% from 25 to 44, 27.8% from 45 to 64, and 9.4% who were 65 years of age or older. The median age was 38 years. For every 100 females, there were 102.4 males. For every 100 females age 18 and over, there were 105.7 males.

The median income for a household in the township was $68,491, and the median income for a family was $76,390. Males had a median income of $55,313 versus $32,337 for females. The per capita income for the township was $25,968. About 4.1% of families and 8.0% of the population were below the poverty line, including 7.7% of those under age 18 and 8.0% of those age 65 or over.

== Government ==
=== Local government ===
South Harrison Township is governed under the Township form of New Jersey municipal government, one of 141 municipalities (of the 564) statewide that use this form, the second-most commonly used form of government in the state. The Township Committee is comprised of five members, who are elected directly by the voters at-large in partisan elections to serve three-year terms of office on a staggered basis, with either one or two seats coming up for election each year as part of the November general election in a three-year cycle. At an annual reorganization meeting, the Township Committee selects one of its members to serve as Mayor and another as Deputy Mayor.

As of 2025, members of the South Harrison Township Committee are Mayor Joseph Marino (R, term on committee ends December 31, 2027; term as mayor ends 2025), Deputy Mayor Robert J. Diaz (R, term on committee ends 2026; term as deputy mayor ends 2025), John Horner (R, 2027), Robert L. Richardson (R, 2025) and Robert Schenk (R, 2026).

In 2007, Charles Tyson was elected Mayor, the first African American to hold the post. He was re-elected in 2008. In 2009, however, he declined to seek re-election to a third term, citing the death threats and racist vandalism that had arisen. He had received threatening phone calls and emails, his tires were slashed, and "KKK" was written on a sign on his lawn. A federal indictment has charged a white supremacist from Virginia, Bill White, with "communicating threats in interstate commerce", based on White's emails to Tyson and phone calls to Tyson's wife in 2008. No arrests have been made, however, in connection with the incidents in 2007, even though the town posted a $24,000 reward.

=== Federal, state, and county representation ===
South Harrison Township is located in the 2nd Congressional District and is part of New Jersey's 3rd state legislative district.

For the 119th United States Congress, New Jersey's 2nd congressional district is represented by Jeff Van Drew (R, Dennis Township). New Jersey is represented in the United States Senate by Democrats Cory Booker (Newark, term ends 2027) and Andy Kim (Moorestown, term ends 2031).

For the 2026–2027 session, the 3rd legislative district of the New Jersey Legislature is represented in the State Senate by John Burzichelli (D, Paulsboro) and in the General Assembly by David Bailey (D, Woodstown) and Heather Simmons (D, Glassboro).

Gloucester County is governed by a board of county commissioners, whose seven members are elected at-large to three-year terms of office on a staggered basis in partisan elections, with either two or three seats coming up for election each year. At a reorganization meeting held each January, the Board selects a Director and a Deputy Director from among its members. As of 2025, Gloucester County's Commissioners are:

Director Frank J. DiMarco (D, Deptford Township, 2025), Matt Weng (D, Pitman, 2026), Joann Gattinelli (D, Washington Township, 2026), Nicholas DeSilvio (R, Franklin Township, 2027), Denice DiCarlo (D, West Deptford Township, 2025) Deputy Director Jim Jefferson (D, Woodbury, 2026) and Christopher Konawel Jr. (R, Glassboro, 2027).

Gloucester County's constitutional officers are: Clerk James N. Hogan (D, Franklin Township; 2027), Sheriff Carmel Morina (D, Greenwich Township; 2027) and Surrogate Giuseppe "Joe" Chila (D, Woolwich Township; 2028).

=== Politics ===
United States presidential election results for South Harrison Township 2024 2020 2016 2012 2008 2004
Year	Republican		Democratic		Third party(ies)	
Year	No.	%	No.	%	No.	%
2024	1,278	61.56%	776	37.38%	22	1.06%
2020	1,253	58.52%	867	40.50%	21	0.98%
2016	1,045	60.69%	598	34.73%	79	4.59%
2012	1,008	60.94%	625	37.79%	21	1.27%
2008	979	56.62%	717	41.47%	33	1.91%
2004	869	60.98%	548	38.46%	8	0.56%

As of March 2011, there were a total of 2,146 registered voters in South Harrison, of which 733 (34.2%) were registered as Democrats, 626 (29.2%) were registered as Republicans and 785 (36.6%) were registered as Unaffiliated. There were 2 voters registered as either Libertarians as Greens.

In the 2012 presidential election, Republican Mitt Romney received 60.9% of the vote (1,008 cast), ahead of Democrat Barack Obama with 37.8% (625 votes), and other candidates with 1.3% (21 votes), among the 1,666 ballots cast by the township's 2,238 registered voters (12 ballots were spoiled), for a turnout of 74.4%. In the 2008 presidential election, Republican John McCain received 56.2% of the vote (979 cast), ahead of Democrat Barack Obama with 41.2% (717 votes) and other candidates with 1.9% (33 votes), among the 1,741 ballots cast by the township's 2,168 registered voters, for a turnout of 80.3%. In the 2004 presidential election, Republican George W. Bush received 60.8% of the vote (869 ballots cast), outpolling Democrat John Kerry with 38.3% (548 votes) and other candidates with 0.4% (8 votes), among the 1,429 ballots cast by the township's 1,792 registered voters, for a turnout percentage of 79.7.

Gubernatorial election results for South Harrison Township
Year	Republican		Democratic		Third party(ies)	
Year	No.	%	No.	%	No.	%
2025	988	59.52%	664	40.00%	8	0.48%
2021	909	67.79%	420	31.32%	12	0.89%
2017	529	56.88%	381	40.97%	20	2.15%
2013	709	73.24%	234	24.17%	25	2.58%
2009	666	59.46%	356	31.79%	98	8.75%
2005	654	61.41%	376	35.31%	35	3.29%

In the 2013 gubernatorial election, Republican Chris Christie received 72.6% of the vote (709 cast), ahead of Democrat Barbara Buono with 24.9% (243 votes), and other candidates with 2.6% (25 votes), among the 996 ballots cast by the township's 2,218 registered voters (19 ballots were spoiled), for a turnout of 44.9%. In the 2009 gubernatorial election, Republican Chris Christie received 58.7% of the vote (666 ballots cast), ahead of Democrat Jon Corzine with 31.4% (356 votes), Independent Chris Daggett with 7.8% (89 votes) and other candidates with 0.8% (9 votes), among the 1,134 ballots cast by the township's 2,175 registered voters, yielding a 52.1% turnout.

United States Senate election results for South Harrison Township1
Year	Republican		Democratic		Third party(ies)	
Year	No.	%	No.	%	No.	%
2024	1,231	60.61%	782	38.50%	18	0.89%
2018	891	63.06%	481	34.04%	41	2.90%
2012	920	58.01%	616	38.84%	50	3.15%
2006	654	59.67%	406	37.04%	36	3.28%

United States Senate election results for South Harrison Township2
Year	Republican		Democratic		Third party(ies)	
Year	No.	%	No.	%	No.	%
2020	1,257	59.55%	817	38.70%	37	1.75%
2014	496	63.59%	264	33.85%	20	2.56%
2013	394	66.78%	190	32.20%	6	1.02%
2008	936	57.71%	649	40.01%	37	2.28%

== Education ==
The South Harrison Township School District serves public school students in pre-kindergarten through sixth grade at South Harrison Township Elementary School. As of the 2020–21 school year, the district, comprised of one school, had an enrollment of 315 students and 32.0 classroom teachers (on an FTE basis), for a student–teacher ratio of 9.8:1.

Public school students in seventh through twelfth grades are educated by the Kingsway Regional School District, which also serves students from East Greenwich Township, Swedesboro and Woolwich Township, with the addition of students from Logan Township who attend the district's high school as part of a sending/receiving relationship in which tuition is paid on a per-pupil basis by the Logan Township School District. South Harrison Township accounted for 13% of district enrollment. As of the 2020–21 school year, the district, comprised of two schools, had an enrollment of 2,868 students and 207.8 classroom teachers (on an FTE basis), for a student–teacher ratio of 13.8:1. Schools in the district (with 2020–21 enrollment data from the National Center for Education Statistics) are Kingsway Regional Middle School with 1,023 students in grades 7–8, and Kingsway Regional High School with 1,802 students in grades 9–12. Under a 2011 proposal, Kingsway would have merged with its constituent member's K–6 districts to become a full K–12 district, with various options for including Logan Township as part of the consolidated district.

Students from across the county are eligible to apply to attend Gloucester County Institute of Technology, a four-year high school in Deptford Township that provides technical and vocational education. As a public school, students do not pay tuition to attend the school.

== Transportation ==
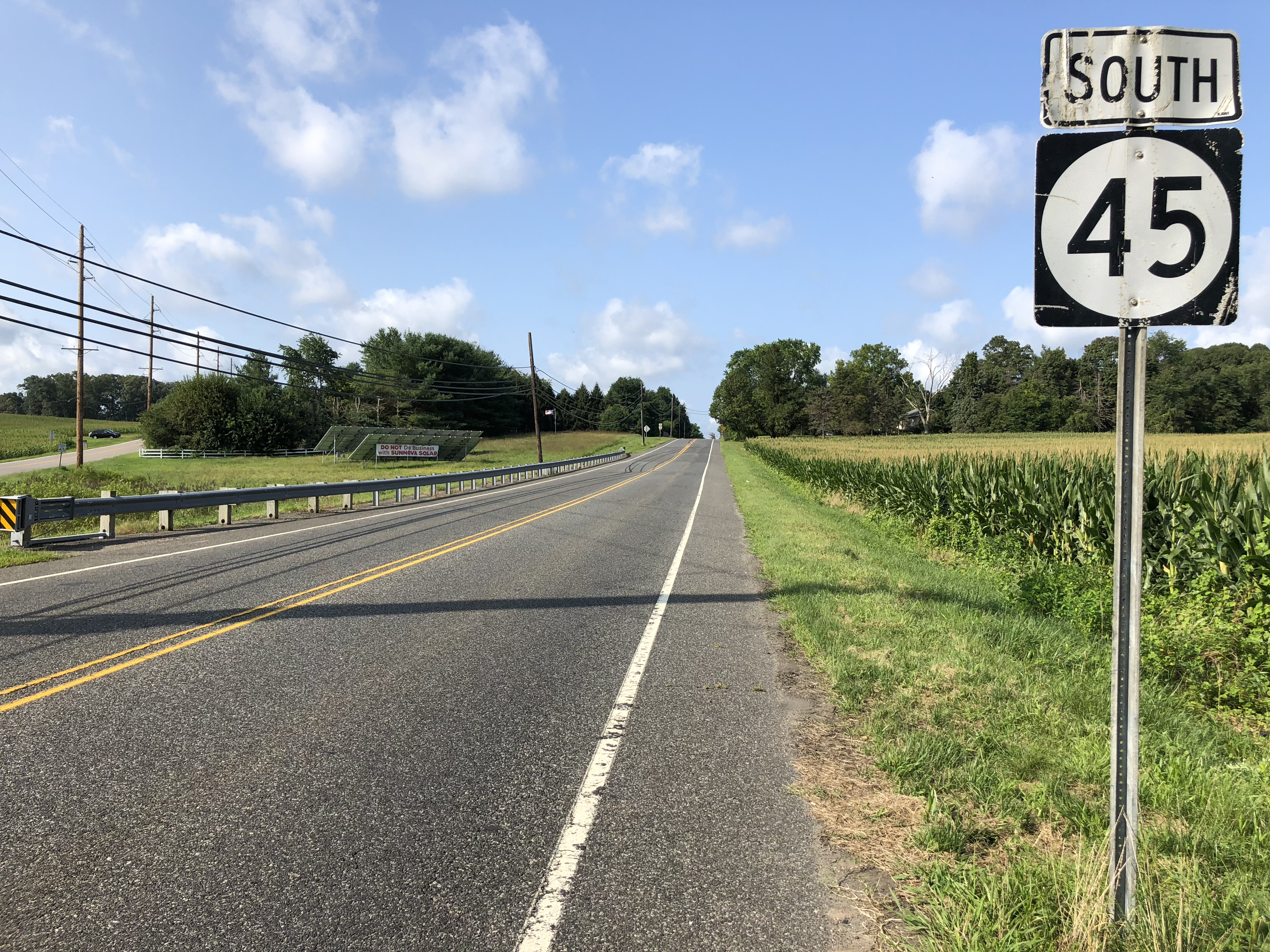
Route 45 southbound in South Harrison Township

As of May 2010, the township had a total of 47.93 miles (77.14 km) of roadways, of which 22.43 miles (36.10 km) were maintained by the municipality, 21.96 miles (35.34 km) by Gloucester County and 3.54 miles (5.70 km) by the New Jersey Department of Transportation.

South Harrison Township is crisscrossed by several major roadways. Route 45, also known as Woodstown-Mullica Hill Road, traverses the township southwest-to-northeast, from the border with Pilesgrove Township to Harrison Township. County Route 538, also known as Swedesboro Road, crosses the northern portion of the township from Woolwich Township in the northwest to Elk Township to the southeast. County Route 581 (Commissioners Pike) crosses from Upper Pittsgrove Township in the south to Harrison Township in the north.

== Wineries ==
- Wagonhouse Winery
