= Harrisonville, New Jersey =

Populated place in Gloucester County, New Jersey, US

- Census-designated place
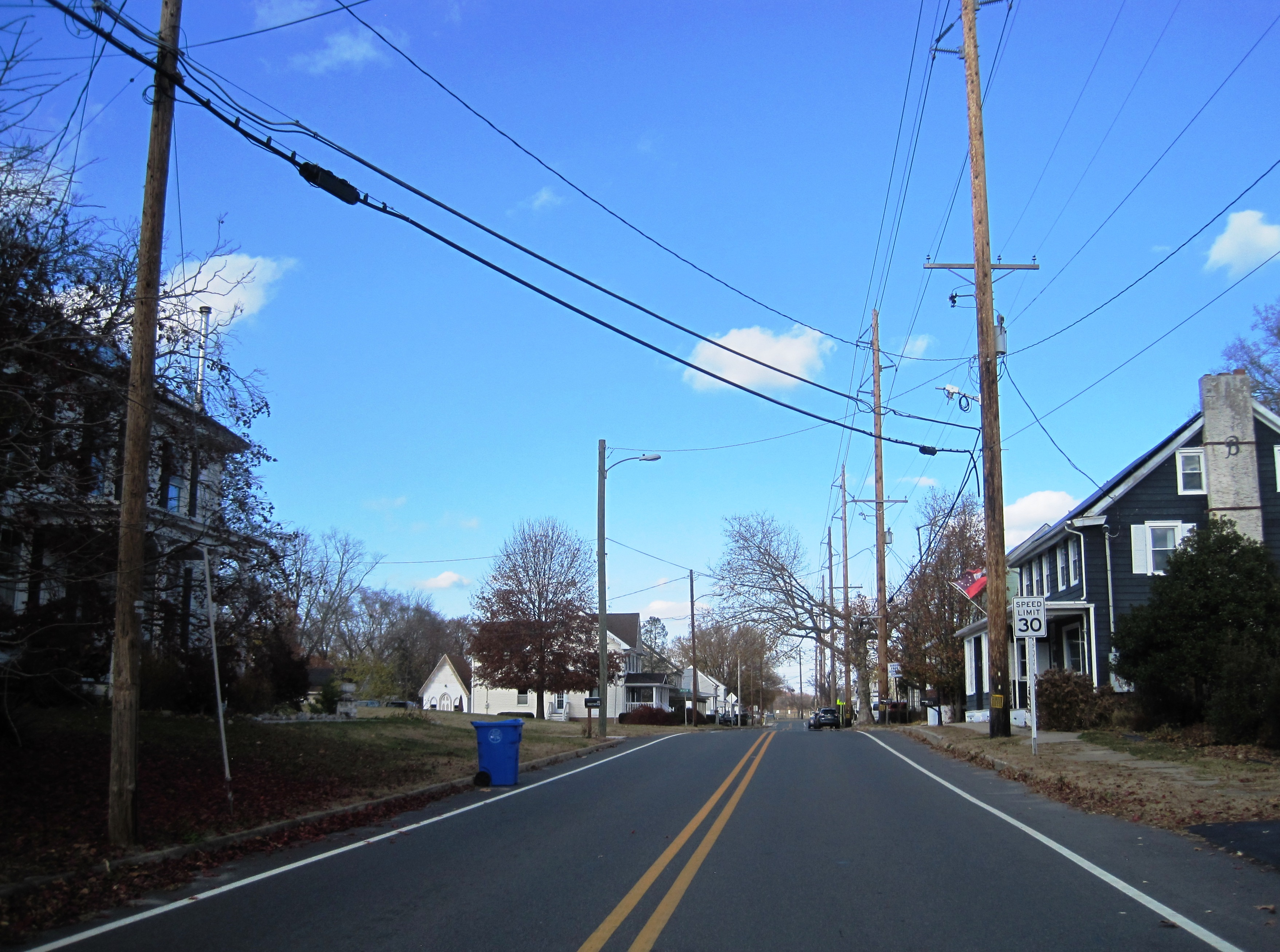
- Northbound CR 617 (Main Street) in Harrisonville

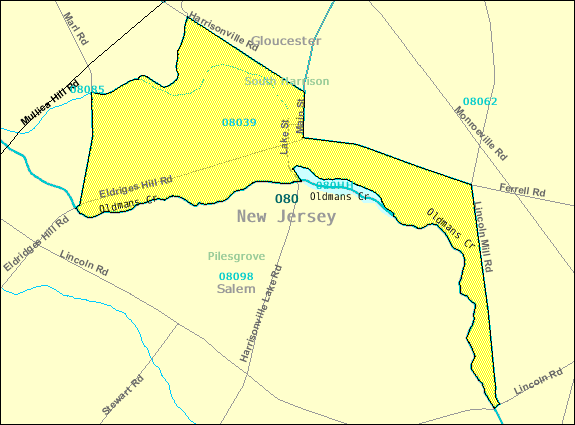
- United States Census Bureau map of Harrisonville, New Jersey

- Location in Gloucester County Location in New Jersey Location in the United States
- Coordinates: 39°41′06″N 75°15′58″W
- Country: United States
- State: New Jersey
- County: Gloucester
- Township: South Harrison

Area
  - Total: 2.03 sq mi (5.25 km^{2})
  - Land: 2.00 sq mi (5.19 km^{2})
  - Water: 0.023 sq mi (0.06 km^{2})
- Elevation: 82 ft (25 m)

Population (2020)
  - Total: 306
  - Density: 152.8/sq mi (58.99/km^{2})
- ZIP Code: 08039
- FIPS code: 34-30270
- GNIS feature ID: 0876971

Harrisonville is an unincorporated community and census-designated place (CDP) located within South Harrison Township, in Gloucester, in the U.S. state of New Jersey. As of the 2020 census, Harrisonville had a population of 306. The area is served as United States Postal Service ZIP Code 08039.

== Demographics ==
Historical population
Census	Pop.	Note	%±
2020	306		—
U.S. Decennial Census

Harrisonville was first listed as a census designated place in the 2020 U.S. census.

Harrisonville CDP, New Jersey – Racial and ethnic composition Note: the US Census treats Hispanic/Latino as an ethnic category. This table excludes Latinos from the racial categories and assigns them to a separate category. Hispanics/Latinos may be of any race.
Race / Ethnicity (NH = Non-Hispanic)	Pop 2020	2020
White alone (NH)	269	87.91%
Black or African American alone (NH)	11	3.59%
Native American or Alaska Native alone (NH)	0	0.00%
Asian alone (NH)	7	2.29%
Native Hawaiian or Pacific Islander alone (NH)	1	0.33%
Other race alone (NH)	3	0.98%
Mixed race or Multiracial (NH)	2	0.65%
Hispanic or Latino (any race)	13	4.25%
Total	306	100.00%

As of 2020, the area had a population of 863. As of 2020, the area had a population of 306.
