= Monroeville, New Jersey =

Populated place in Gloucester and Salem counties, New Jersey, US

- Unincorporated community
- Location within Gloucester County, New Jersey Location within Salem County, New Jersey Location within New Jersey Location within the United States
- Coordinates: 39°37′44″N 75°09′34″W
- Country: United States
- State: New Jersey
- Counties: Gloucester and Salem
- Townships: Elk and Upper Pittsgrove
- Named for: Rev. Samuel Y. Monroe
- Elevation: 138 ft (42 m)

Population (2010 census)
  - Total: 5,030
- ZIP Code: 08343
- GNIS feature ID: 0878442

Monroeville is an unincorporated community located within portions of Elk Township in Gloucester County and Upper Pittsgrove Township in Salem County, in the U.S. state of New Jersey. The area is served as United States Postal Service ZIP Code 08343. Monroeville is mostly filled with wooded areas and farms.

Most of the residents attend Upper Pittsgrove School if they are in the Upper Pittsgrove Township portion, although some attend Olivet Elementary in Pittsgrove Township.

Monroeville was named after Rev. Samuel Y. Monroe, and had also been called Monroe Station for the train depot located in the area. It had contained a cigar factory, a blacksmith shop and a creamery. During the 1880s and 1890s, it was one of several South Jersey destinations settled by Russian Jewish immigrants who were offered transportation by ship from Europe, and were provided with land and a cow in farming colonies.

As of the 2010 United States census, the population for ZIP Code Tabulation Area 08343 was 5,030. As of the 2000 census, the population was 4,596.
