= Upper Pittsgrove Township, New Jersey =

Township in Salem County, New Jersey, US

- Township
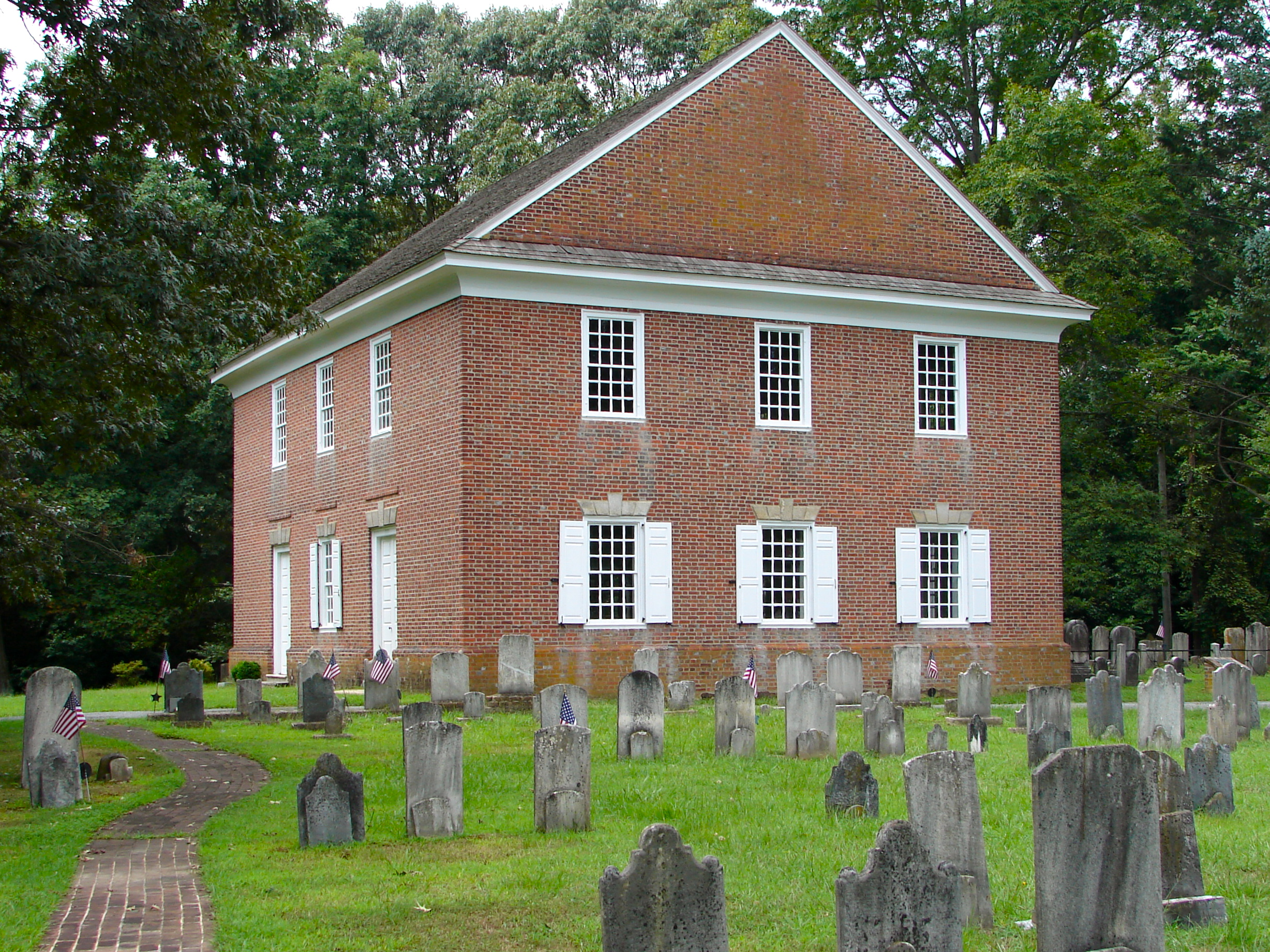
- Pittsgrove Presbyterian Church

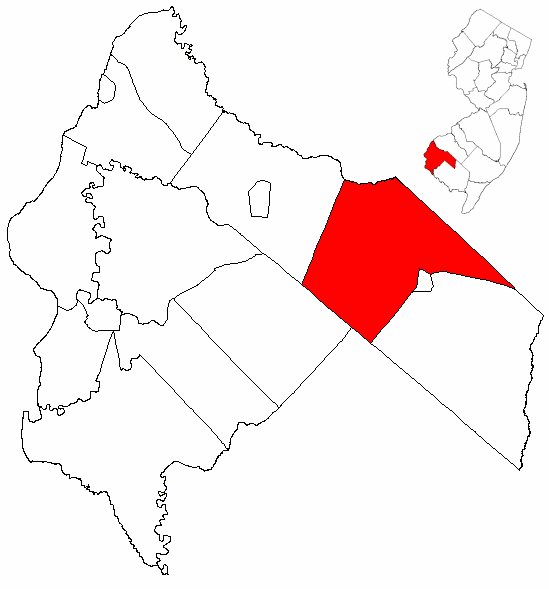
- Upper Pittsgrove Township highlighted in Salem County. Inset map: Salem County highlighted in the State of New Jersey.

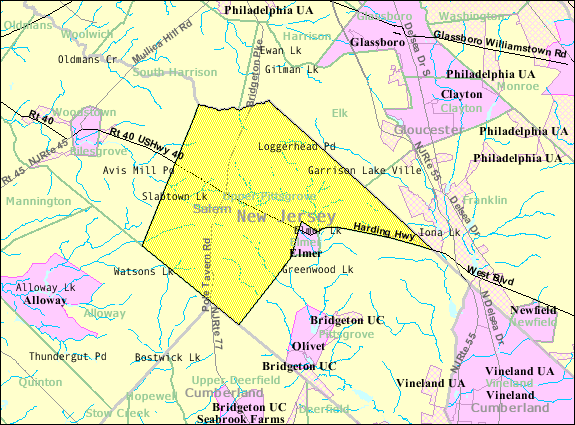
- Census Bureau map of Upper Pittsgrove Township, New Jersey
- Interactive map of Upper Pittsgrove Township, New Jersey
- Location in Salem County Location in New Jersey Location in the United States
- Coordinates: 39.612375°N 75.209549°W
- Country: United States
- State: New Jersey
- County: Salem
- Incorporated: March 10, 1846

Government
  - Type: Township
  - Body: Township Committee
  - Mayor: David Zeck Sr. (R, term ends December 31, 2023)
  - Municipal clerk: Linda R. Stephens

Area
  - Total: 40.39 sq mi (104.60 km^{2})
  - Land: 40.24 sq mi (104.23 km^{2})
  - Water: 0.15 sq mi (0.38 km^{2}) 0.36%
  - Rank: 54th of 565 in state 3rd of 15 in county
- Elevation: 131 ft (40 m)

Population (2020)
  - Total: 3,432
  - Estimate (2023): 3,464
  - Rank: 430th of 565 in state 8th of 15 in county
  - Density: 85.3/sq mi (32.9/km^{2})
  - Rank: 545th of 565 in state 12th of 15 in county
- Time zone: UTC−05:00 (Eastern (EST))
  - Summer (DST): UTC−04:00 (Eastern (EDT))
- ZIP Code: 08318 – Elmer
- Area code: 856
- FIPS code: 3403375110
- GNIS feature ID: 1723212
- Website: upperpittsgrovenj.org

Upper Pittsgrove Township is a township in Salem County, in the U.S. state of New Jersey. As of the 2020 United States census, the township's population was 3,432, a decrease of 73 (−2.1%) from the 2010 census count of 3,505, which in turn reflected an increase of 37 (+1.1%) from the 3,468 counted in the 2000 census.

Upper Pittsgrove Township was incorporated on March 10, 1846, from portions of Pittsgrove Township. Portions of the township were taken on January 28, 1893, to form Elmer.

The township was named for Pittsgrove Township, which in turn was named for William Pitt, 1st Earl of Chatham, a supporter of the colonial cause.

It is a dry town, where alcohol cannot be sold, as affirmed by a referendum passed in 1979, though alcohol is available at a winery and a distillery in the township.

== Geography ==
According to the United States Census Bureau, the township had a total area of 40.39 square miles (104.60 km^{2}), including 40.24 square miles (104.23 km^{2}) of land and 0.15 square miles (0.38 km^{2}) of water (0.36%). Upper Pittsgrove leads New Jersey in acres of active agriculture and preserved farmland. The Salem River has its source in the township.

Unincorporated communities, localities and place names located partially or completely within the township include Ballingers Mill, Daretown, Foxs Mill, Friendship Church, Monroeville, New Freedom, Newkirk, Pittsgrove, Pole Tavern, Shirley, Whig Lane and Woods Mills.

The township borders Alloway Township, Elmer, Pilesgrove Township and Pittsgrove Township in Salem County; Upper Deerfield Township in Cumberland County; and Elk Township, Franklin Township and South Harrison Township in Gloucester County.

== Demographics ==
Historical population
Census	Pop.	Note	%±
1850	1,656		—
1860	2,082		25.7%
1870	2,087		0.2%
1880	2,073		−0.7%
1890	1,923		−7.2%
1900	1,725	*	−10.3%
1910	1,754		1.7%
1920	1,724		−1.7%
1930	1,899		10.2%
1940	1,925		1.4%
1950	2,204		14.5%
1960	2,715		23.2%
1970	2,884		6.2%
1980	3,139		8.8%
1990	3,140		0.0%
2000	3,468		10.4%
2010	3,505		1.1%
2020	3,432		−2.1%
2023 (est.)	3,464		0.9%
Population sources: 1850–2000; 1850–1920 1850–1870; 1850 1870 1880–1890; 1890–1910 1910–1930; 1940–2000 2000; 2010 2020 * = Lost territory in previous decade.

=== 2010 census ===
The 2010 United States census counted 3,505 people, 1,247 households, and 932 families in the township. The population density was 86.9 inhabitants per square mile (33.6/km^{2}). There were 1,310 housing units at an average density of 32.5 per square mile (12.5/km^{2}). The racial makeup was 94.89% (3,326) White, 2.17% (76) Black or African American, 0.43% (15) Native American, 0.23% (8) Asian, 0.00% (0) Pacific Islander, 0.91% (32) from other races, and 1.37% (48) from two or more races. Hispanic or Latino of any race were 3.02% (106) of the population.

Of the 1,247 households, 28.4% had children under the age of 18; 62.6% were married couples living together; 6.9% had a female householder with no husband present and 25.3% were non-families. Of all households, 20.9% were made up of individuals and 9.9% had someone living alone who was 65 years of age or older. The average household size was 2.73 and the average family size was 3.17.

22.4% of the population were under the age of 18, 7.7% from 18 to 24, 21.8% from 25 to 44, 32.5% from 45 to 64, and 15.7% who were 65 years of age or older. The median age was 43.7 years. For every 100 females, the population had 102.6 males. For every 100 females ages 18 and older there were 100.4 males.

The Census Bureau's 2006–2010 American Community Survey showed that (in 2010 inflation-adjusted dollars) median household income was $80,957 (with a margin of error of +/− $12,476) and the median family income was $83,438 (+/− $13,632). Males had a median income of $55,246 (+/− $4,750) versus $36,316 (+/− $13,317) for females. The per capita income for the borough was $30,264 (+/− $3,595). About 2.4% of families and 5.0% of the population were below the poverty line, including 2.2% of those under age 18 and 4.2% of those age 65 or over.

=== 2000 census ===
As of the 2000 United States census there were 3,468 people, 1,207 households, and 959 families residing in the township. The population density was 85.9 inhabitants per square mile (33.2/km^{2}). There were 1,250 housing units at an average density of 31.0 per square mile (12.0/km^{2}). The racial makeup of the township was 94.84% White, 2.16% African American, 0.52% Native American, 0.32% Asian, 1.30% from other races, and 0.87% from two or more races. Hispanic or Latino of any race were 3.14% of the population.

There were 1,207 households, out of which 35.1% had children under the age of 18 living with them, 67.5% were married couples living together, 7.2% had a female householder with no husband present, and 20.5% were non-families. 16.9% of all households were made up of individuals, and 7.5% had someone living alone who was 65 years of age or older. The average household size was 2.80 and the average family size was 3.13.

In the township the population was spread out, with 25.3% under the age of 18, 7.6% from 18 to 24, 27.5% from 25 to 44, 26.0% from 45 to 64, and 13.8% who were 65 years of age or older. The median age was 39 years. For every 100 females, there were 99.3 males. For every 100 females age 18 and over, there were 95.4 males.

The median income for a household in the township was $53,813, and the median income for a family was $56,768. Males had a median income of $41,319 versus $27,976 for females. The per capita income for the township was $21,732. About 6.0% of families and 8.5% of the population were below the poverty line, including 12.7% of those under age 18 and 5.6% of those age 65 or over.

== Government ==
=== Local government ===
Upper Pittsgrove Township is governed under the Township form of New Jersey municipal government, one of 141 municipalities (of the 564) statewide that use this form, the second-most commonly used form of government in the state. The Township Committee is comprised of five members, who are elected directly by the voters at-large in partisan elections to serve three-year terms of office on a staggered basis, with either one or two seats coming up for election each year as part of the November general election in a three-year cycle. At an annual reorganization meeting, the council selects one of its members to serves as mayor and another as deputy mayor.

As of 2022, members of the Upper Pittsgrove Township Council are Mayor Edward J. Meschi (R, term on committee ends December 31, 2023; term as mayor ends 2022), Deputy Mayor David Zeck Sr. (R, term on committee ends 2023; term as deputy mayor ends 2022), Bruce W. Bishop (R, 2024), Jack R. Cimprich (R, 2024) and Michael J. Seery Sr. (R, 2022).

=== Federal, state and county representation ===
Upper Pittsgrove Township is located in the 2nd Congressional District and is part of New Jersey's 3rd state legislative district.

For the 119th United States Congress, New Jersey's 2nd congressional district is represented by Jeff Van Drew (R, Dennis Township). New Jersey is represented in the United States Senate by Democrats Cory Booker (Newark, term ends 2027) and Andy Kim (Moorestown, term ends 2031).

For the 2026–2027 session, the 3rd legislative district of the New Jersey Legislature is represented in the State Senate by John Burzichelli (D, Paulsboro) and in the General Assembly by David Bailey (D, Woodstown) and Heather Simmons (D, Glassboro).

Salem County is governed by a five-member Board of County Commissioners who are elected at-large to serve three-year terms of office on a staggered basis, with either one or two seats coming up for election each year. At an annual reorganization meeting held in the beginning of January, the board selects a Director and a Deputy Director from among its members. As of 2025, Salem County's Commissioners (with party, residence, and term-end year listed in parentheses) are:

Director Benjamin H. Laury (R, Elmer, 2027), Deputy Director Cordy Taylor (R, Oldmans Township, 2028), Paul Collier (R, Lower Alloways Creek, 2027), Ed Ramsey (R, Pittsgrove Township, 2026), and Daniel Timmerman (R, Elmer, 2028).

Constitutional officers elected on a countywide basis are: Clerk Dale A. Cross (R, Pennsville Township, 2029), Sheriff Charles M. Miller (R, Salem, 2027) and Surrogate Gordon J. Ostrum Jr. (R, Pilesgrove Township, 2030).

=== Politics ===
As of March 23, 2011, there were a total of 2,370 registered voters in Upper Pittsgrove Township, of which 447 (18.9% vs. 30.6% countywide) were registered as Democrats, 688 (29.0% vs. 21.0%) were registered as Republicans and 1,235 (52.1% vs. 48.4%) were registered as Unaffiliated. There were no voters registered to other parties. Among the township's 2010 Census population, 67.6% (vs. 64.6% in Salem County) were registered to vote, including 87.1% of those ages 18 and over (vs. 84.4% countywide).

Gubernatorial election results for Upper Pittsgrove Township
Year	Republican		Democratic		Third party(ies)	
Year	No.	%	No.	%	No.	%
2025	1,059	70.88%	425	28.45%	10	0.67%
2021	1,004	76.88%	296	22.66%	6	0.46%
2017	645	63.67%	327	32.28%	41	4.05%
2013	896	76.91%	234	20.09%	35	3.00%
2009	814	60.03%	372	27.43%	170	12.54%
2005	779	60.95%	440	34.43%	59	4.62%

In the 2012 presidential election, Republican Mitt Romney received 65.3% of the vote (1,102 cast), ahead of Democrat Barack Obama with 33.1% (558 votes), and other candidates with 1.6% (27 votes), among the 1,699 ballots cast by the township's 2,395 registered voters (12 ballots were spoiled), for a turnout of 70.9%. In the 2008 presidential election, Republican John McCain received 1,173 votes (64.8% vs. 46.6% countywide), ahead of Democrat Barack Obama with 595 votes (32.9% vs. 50.4%) and other candidates with 23 votes (1.3% vs. 1.6%), among the 1,810 ballots cast by the township's 2,449 registered voters, for a turnout of 73.9% (vs. 71.8% in Salem County). In the 2004 presidential election, Republican George W. Bush received 1,192 votes (64.4% vs. 52.5% countywide), ahead of Democrat John Kerry with 621 votes (33.6% vs. 45.9%) and other candidates with 29 votes (1.6% vs. 1.0%), among the 1,850 ballots cast by the township's 2,477 registered voters, for a turnout of 74.7% (vs. 71.0% in the whole county).

United States presidential election results for Upper Pittsgrove Township 2024 2020 2016 2012 2008 2004
Year	Republican		Democratic		Third party(ies)	
Year	No.	%	No.	%	No.	%
2024	1,411	73.60%	475	24.78%	31	1.62%
2020	1,463	72.28%	533	26.33%	28	1.38%
2016	1,232	69.84%	458	25.96%	74	4.20%
2012	1,102	65.32%	558	33.08%	27	1.60%
2008	1,173	65.49%	595	33.22%	23	1.28%
2004	1,192	64.71%	621	33.71%	29	1.57%

In the 2013 gubernatorial election, Republican Chris Christie received 76.9% of the vote (896 cast), ahead of Democrat Barbara Buono with 20.1% (234 votes), and other candidates with 3.0% (35 votes), among the 1,172 ballots cast by the township's 2,372 registered voters (7 ballots were spoiled), for a turnout of 49.4%. In the 2009 gubernatorial election, Republican Chris Christie received 814 votes (59.2% vs. 46.1% countywide), ahead of Democrat Jon Corzine with 372 votes (27.0% vs. 39.9%), Independent Chris Daggett with 138 votes (10.0% vs. 9.7%) and other candidates with 32 votes (2.3% vs. 2.0%), among the 1,376 ballots cast by the township's 2,441 registered voters, yielding a 56.4% turnout (vs. 47.3% in the county).

United States Senate election results for Upper Pittsgrove Township1
Year	Republican		Democratic		Third party(ies)	
Year	No.	%	No.	%	No.	%
2024	1,362	71.35%	507	26.56%	40	2.10%
2018	1,025	72.03%	348	24.46%	50	3.51%
2012	1,002	60.99%	591	35.97%	50	3.04%
2006	899	62.21%	485	33.56%	61	4.22%

United States Senate election results for Upper Pittsgrove Township2
Year	Republican		Democratic		Third party(ies)	
Year	No.	%	No.	%	No.	%
2020	1,397	70.24%	553	27.80%	39	1.96%
2014	746	65.21%	347	30.33%	51	4.46%
2013	483	75.94%	150	23.58%	3	0.47%
2008	1,010	57.68%	654	37.35%	87	4.97%

== Education ==
The Upper Pittsgrove School District serves public school students in pre-kindergarten through eighth grade at Upper Pittsgrove School. As of the 2024–25 school year, the district, comprised of one school, had an enrollment of 340 students and 34.0 classroom teachers (on an FTE basis), for a student–teacher ratio of 10.0:1.

Students in public school for ninth through twelfth grades attend Woodstown High School in Woodstown, which serves students from Pilesgrove Township and Woodstown, along with students Alloway Township, Oldmans Township and Upper Pittsgrove Township who attend the high school as part of sending/receiving relationships with the Woodstown-Pilesgrove Regional School District. As of the 2024–25 school year, the high school had an enrollment of 550 students and 50.4 classroom teachers (on an FTE basis), for a student–teacher ratio of 10.9:1.

== Transportation ==
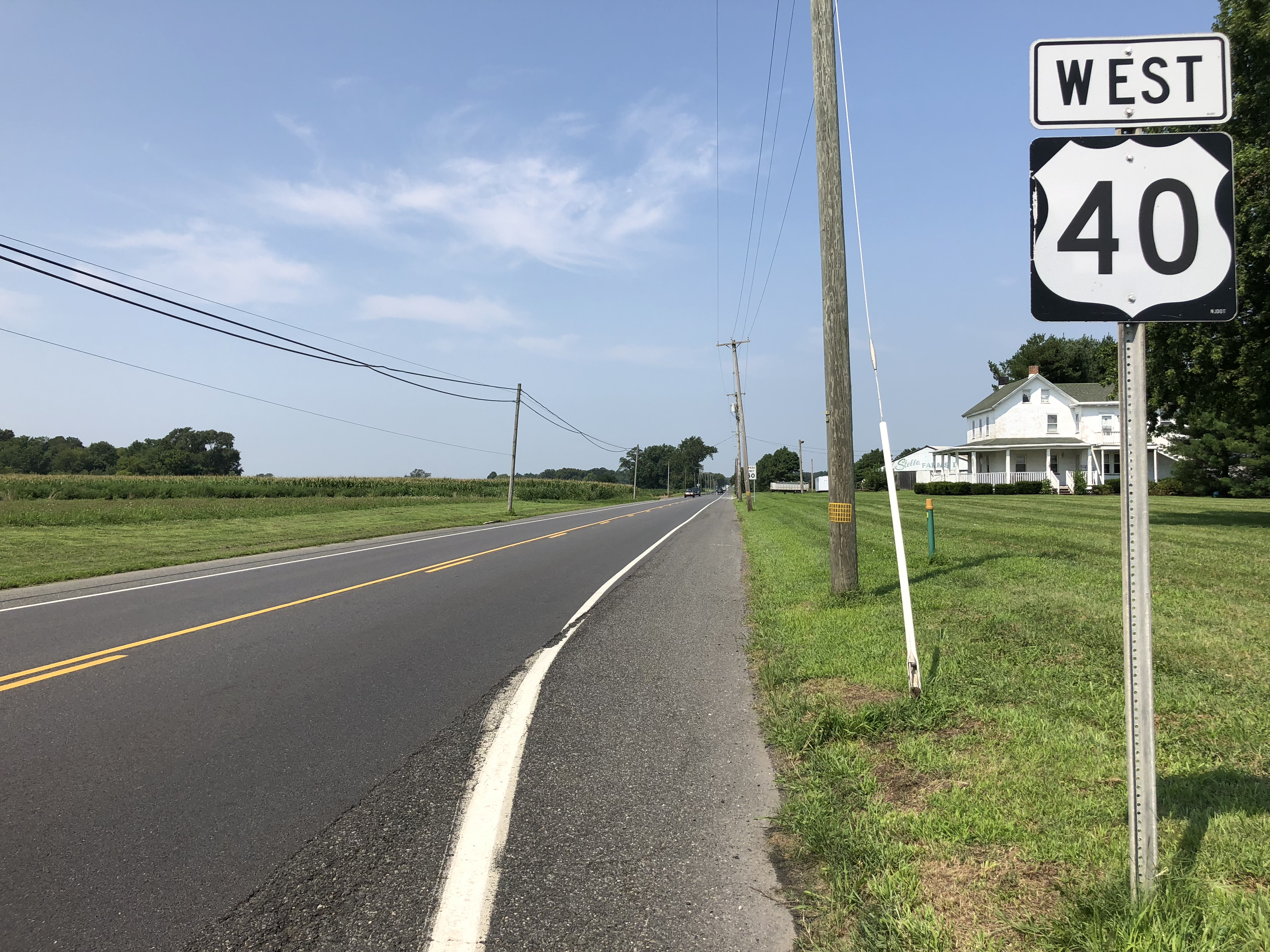
U.S. Route 40 westbound in Upper Pittsgrove Township

=== Roads and highways ===
As of May 2010, the township has a total of 111.44 miles (179.35 km) of roadways, of which 43.02 miles (69.23 km) were maintained by the municipality, 51.38 miles (82.69 km) by Salem County and 17.04 miles (27.42 km) by the New Jersey Department of Transportation.

State Route 77 runs through the center of the township for 7.6 miles (12.2 km) from Upper Deerfield Township in Cumberland County to Elk Township in Gloucester County to the north. U.S. Route 40 (Harding Highway) runs across the township for about 10.0 miles (16.1 km), from Pilesgrove Township in the west, enters Elmer borough, re-enters the township and continues to Franklin Township in Gloucester County to the east. County Route 553 (Buck Road) cuts across the eastern panhandle of the township, from Pittsgrove Township in the south to Franklin Township in the north. County Route 581 (Commissioners Pike) enters on the western border from Pilesgrove Township and heads north for 3.5 miles (5.6 km) towards South Harrison Township.

Pole Tavern Circle is a traffic circle at the intersection of U.S. Route 40, State Route 77, Monroeville Road (County Route 604), and Daretown Road (County Route 635). The Pole Tavern Circle, named for a liberty pole that stood at the site during the American Revolutionary War, is the location of a large historic cannon that was first placed there in 1913.

=== Public transportation ===
NJ Transit provides service between Bridgeton and Philadelphia on the 410 route.

== Winery ==
- Monroeville Vineyard & Winery

== Notable people ==
People who were born in, residents of, or otherwise closely associated with Upper Pittsgrove include:

- Roscoe Lockwood (1875–1960), rower who competed in the 1900 Summer Olympics
