= Whig Lane, New Jersey =

Populated place in Salem County, New Jersey, US

- Unincorporated community
- Location within Upper Pittsgrove Township. Inset: Location of Salem County in the state of New Jersey. Whig Lane, New Jersey (New Jersey) Whig Lane, New Jersey (the United States)
- Coordinates: 39°38′22″N 75°13′44″W
- Country: United States
- State: New Jersey
- County: Salem
- Township: Upper Pittsgrove
- Elevation: 144 ft (44 m)
- Time zone: UTC−05:00 (Eastern (EST))
  - Summer (DST): UTC−04:00 (EDT)
- GNIS feature ID: 881769

Whig Lane is an unincorporated community located within Upper Pittsgrove Township in Salem County, New Jersey, United States. It is located approximately 5 mi (8.0 km) east of Woodstown.

The settlement is named for an altercation which occurred there in 1769 between Tories and Whigs. Around that time—prior to the American Revolution—one part of the settlement was also called "Tory Lane".

Whig Lane had a post office in 1897.
