= Lincoln, Gloucester County, New Jersey =

Populated place in Gloucester County, New Jersey, US

Lincoln, New Jersey
- Unincorporated community
- Location within Gloucester County, New Jersey Location within New Jersey Location within the United States
- Coordinates: 39°40′10″N 75°14′27″W
- Country: United States
- State: New Jersey
- County: Gloucester
- Township: South Harrison
- Elevation: 135 ft (41 m)
- Time zone: UTC−05:00 (Eastern (EST))
  - Summer (DST): UTC−04:00 (EDT)
- GNIS feature ID: 877761

Lincoln is a hamlet and unincorporated community in South Harrison Township, Gloucester County, in the U.S. state of New Jersey.

Formerly known as Stringtown, it is located in the southeastern part of the township, near the border with Salem County. It contained a grist mill, saw mill and a few houses. The grist mill was purchased in 1828 by James Jessup, who then purchased the saw mill in 1833.
