= List of county routes in Ocean County, New Jersey =

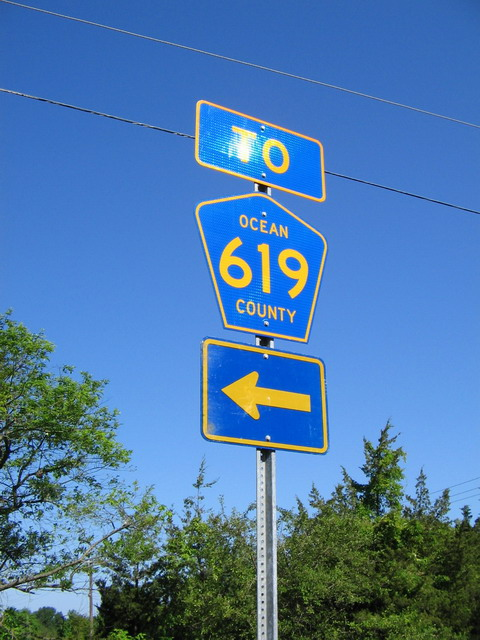
Shield for CR 619

The following is a list of county routes in Ocean County in the U.S. state of New Jersey. For more information on the county route system in New Jersey as a whole, including its history, see County routes in New Jersey.

== 500-series county routes ==
In addition to those listed below, the following 500-series county routes serve Ocean County:

- CR 526, CR 527, CR 528, CR 530, CR 532, CR 537, CR 539, CR 547, CR 549, CR 549 Spur, CR 554, CR 571

== Other county routes ==
Route	Length (mi)	Length (km)	From	Via	To	Notes
CR 3	0.18	0.29	Union Avenue in Lakehurst	Center Street	Route 70 and Center Street (CR 547) in Lakehurst	
CR 7	0.25	0.40	Central Avenue (CR 607) and Broadway (CR 607) in Barnegat Light	Central Avenue	West 4th Street in Barnegat Light	
CR 22	1.23	1.98	Hooper Avenue (CR 549) in Toms River	Cedar Grove Road	Bay Avenue (CR 571) in Toms River	
CR 27	1.05	1.69	Bay Avenue (CR 571) and Fischer Boulevard (CR 549 Spur/CR 571) in Toms River	Bay Avenue	Dead end in Toms River	
CR 30	1.30	2.09	Lanes Mill Road (CR 549) in Lakewood	Joe Parker Road	Lanes Mill Road (CR 526) in Lakewood	
CR 31	1.35	2.17	North Hope Chapel Road (CR 639) in Jackson	New Central Avenue	Central Avenue (CR 528/CR 547) in Lakewood	
CR 32	1.93	3.11	Lakewood Road (US 9) in Toms River	Silverton Road	Dead end in Toms River	
CR 35	3.97	6.39	Main Street (US 9) in Tuckerton	Wood Street, Railroad Avenue	Coxs Avenue in Eagleswood	
CR 38	0.95	1.53	Washington Street in Toms River	Clifton Avenue	Cedar Grove Road (CR 22) in Toms River	
CR 42	1.6	2.57	Princeton Post Road (Route 88) in Brick	Van Zile Road	Burnt Tavern Road (CR 632) in Brick	
CR 47	0.72	1.16	Dupont Avenue in Seaside Heights	Central Avenue	Hiering Avenue in Seaside Heights	
CR 49	0.95	1.53	Central Avenue (Route 35) in Berkeley Township	24th Avenue, Barnegat Avenue	South Bayview Avenue in Seaside Park	
CR 50	3.08	4.96	Main Street (US 9) in Stafford Township	Bay Avenue	Dead end in Stafford Township	Former Route 72 and Route 180
CR 53	2.46	3.96	14th Avenue in Seaside Park	South Ocean Avenue, North Ocean Avenue, Ocean Terrace	Hiering Avenue in Seaside Heights	
CR 59	1.25	2.01	Whitesville Road (CR 527) in Jackson	Faraday Avenue	Cross Street (CR 626) in Lakewood	
CR 69	1.07	1.72	Rue Avenue in Point Pleasant	Atlantic Avenue	Ocean Avenue (CR 635) in Point Pleasant Beach	
CR 71 (1)	0.57	0.92	Arnold Avenue (CR 633) in Point Pleasant	Trenton Avenue	Cincinnati Avenue (Route 35) in Point Pleasant Beach	
CR 71 (2)	0.89	1.43	Chicago Avenue in Point Pleasant Beach	Baltimore Avenue	Dead end in Point Pleasant Beach	
CR 72	0.83	1.34	Old Freehold Road (CR 623) in Toms River	Chestnut Street	Hooper Avenue (CR 549) in Toms River	
CR 77	1.08	1.74	Ship Avenue in Beachwood	Birch Street, Double Trouble Road, Tilton Avenue	Dover Road (CR 530) in South Toms River	
CR 79 (1)	0.20	0.32	Route 35 in Seaside Park	Porter Avenue	Ocean Terrace on the Seaside Heights/Seaside Park border	
CR 79 (2)	0.09	0.14	Barnegat Avenue on the Seaside Heights/Seaside Park border	Porter Avenue	NW Central Avenue in Seaside Heights	
CR 83 (1)	0.71	1.14	Massachusetts Avenue (CR 637) in Toms River	Honey Locust Drive	Route 70 in Lakewood	
CR 83 (2)	1.02	1.64	Route 70 in Lakewood	Locust Street	New Hampshire Avenue (CR 623) in Lakewood	
CR 85	2.75	4.43	Manchester Avenue in Lacey Township	Western Boulevard	Northern Boulevard in Berkeley Township	
CR 101	1.30	2.09	Seneca Boulevard in Ocean Township	7th Street	Main Street (CR 613) in Ocean Township	
CR 103	2.18	3.51	End of the county maintenance in Little Egg Harbor	Center Street	US 9 in Tuckerton	
CR 105	3.59	5.78	Route 72 in Stafford Township	Lighthouse Drive	West Bay Avenue (CR 554) in Barnegat	
CR 107	0.92	1.48	Antioch Road in Long Beach Township	Arnold Boulevard, Auburn Road, West 20th Street	Central Avenue (CR 607) in Barnegat Light	
CR 109	0.87	1.40	Dover Road (CR 530) and Double Trouble Road (CR 619) in South Toms River	Railroad Avenue, 1st Street, Magnolia Avenue	South Main Street (CR 530) in South Toms River	
CR 111	3.66	5.89	Route 72 in Stafford Township	Nautilus Drive	West Bay Avenue (CR 554) in Barnegat	
CR 601	5.15	8.29	Dead end in Little Egg Harbor	Maple Avenue, Western Avenue, Radio Road	US 9 in Tuckerton	
CR 602	5.18	8.34	CR 539 in Little Egg Harbor	Thomas Avenue, Main Street, Dock Road	Dead end in Eagleswood	
CR 603	1.94	3.12	Dead end in Tuckerton	Green Street	Main Street (US 9) and Green Street (CR 539) in Tuckerton	
CR 604	1.84	2.96	Dead end in Point Pleasant	Bay Avenue	Arnold Avenue (CR 633) in Point Pleasant Beach	
CR 605	3.17	5.10	Dead end in Eagleswood	Cedar Run Dock Road	US 9 in Stafford Township	
CR 606	3.67	5.91	Green Street (CR 539) in Little Egg Harbor	Forge Road, Stafford Forge Road	US 9 in Eagleswood	
CR 607	18.07	29.08	McKinley Avenue in Long Beach Township	Long Beach Boulevard, Bay Avenue, Long Beach Boulevard, Central Avenue, Broadway	Dead end in Barnegat Light	
CR 608	1.26	2.03	Warren Grove Road at the Burlington County line in Little Egg Harbor	Simm Place Road	Main Street (CR 539) in Stafford Township	
CR 609	3.85	6.20	Main Street (US 9) and Bay Avenue (CR 554) in Barnegat	Bay Avenue, Plank Road, Bayshore Drive	Main Street (US 9) in Barnegat	
CR 610	2.11	3.40	Main Street (CR 539) in Stafford Township	Cedar Bridge Road, Warren Grove Road	Route 72 in Barnegat	
CR 611	1.91	3.07	Bay Avenue (CR 554) in Barnegat	Brookville Road	Wells Mills Road (CR 532) in Ocean Township	
CR 612	0.71	1.14	US 9 and Wells Mills Road (CR 532) in Ocean Township	Bryant Road	Dead end in Ocean Township	
CR 613	1.59	2.56	US 9 in Ocean Township	Main Street	US 9 in Ocean Township	
CR 614	13.78	22.18	Lacey Road (CR 530) and Pinewald–Keswick Road (CR 530) in Manchester	Lacey Road	Dead end in Lacey Township	
CR 615	2.99	4.81	Lacey Road (CR 614) in Lacey Township	Lake Road	Lacey Road (CR 530) in Manchester	
CR 616	0.59	0.95	Cookstown–New Egypt Road (CR 616) at the Burlington County line in Plumsted Township	Maple Avenue	Jacobstown Road (CR 528) and Main Street (CR 528) in Plumsted Township	
CR 617	10.77	17.33	Atlantic City Boulevard (US 9) in Berkeley Township	Harbor Inn Road, Neary Avenue, Brennan Concourse, Bayview Avenue, Bay Boulevard, East Bayview Avenue, Bayview Avenue, East Bayview Avenue, Bayview Avenue, East Bayview Avenue, Ocean Gate Avenue, West Chelsea Avenue, Chelsea Avenue, Prospect Avenue, Station Avenue, Springfield Avenue, Bayside Avenue, Clubhouse Road, Compass Avenue, Starboard Street	Atlantic City Boulevard (Route 166) in Beachwood	
CR 618	11.26	18.12	Lacey Road (CR 614) in Lacey Township	Dover Road, Pinewald-Keswick Road, Forest Hills Parkway, Veterans Boulevard, Central Parkway, Butler Boulevard, Bayview Avenue	Dead end in Berkeley Township	
CR 619	3.20	5.15	Pinewald–Keswick Road (CR 618) in Berkeley Township	Double Trouble Road	Dover Road (CR 530) in South Toms River	
CR 620	5.51	8.87	Lakewood Road (US 9) in Toms River	Church Road, Kettle Creek Road	Green Island Road in Toms River	
CR 621	3.76	6.05	Forest Hills Parkway (CR 618) in Berkeley Township	Grand Central Parkway, Pinewald Road, Surf Avenue, Admiral Avenue	Atlantic City Boulevard (Route 166) in Beachwood	
CR 622	2.80	4.51	Whitesville Road (CR 527) in Toms River	Cox Cro Road, Old Freehold Road	New Hampshire Avenue (CR 623) in Toms River	
CR 623	10.02	16.13	Lakewood Road (Route 166) in Toms River	Old Freehold Road, New Hampshire Avenue, Ridge Avenue	County Line Road (CR 526) and Lanes Mill Road (CR 526) in Lakewood	
CR 624	3.21	5.17	Brick Boulevard (CR 549) in Brick	Drum Point Road, Adamston Road	Mantoloking Road (CR 528) in Brick	
CR 625	1.17	1.88	Atlantic City Boulevard (US 9) in Berkeley Township	Ocean Gate Drive	West Chelsea Avenue (CR 617) in Ocean Gate	
CR 626	2.88	4.63	East Veterans Highway (CR 528/CR 547) in Jackson	Cross Street	River Avenue (US 9) in Lakewood	
CR 627	3.01	4.84	Route 37 in Island Heights	Central Avenue, River Avenue, West End Avenue, Vaughn Avenue	Bay Avenue (CR 571) in Toms River	
CR 628	1.52	2.45	Cross Street (CR 626) in Lakewood	Prospect Street	River Avenue (US 9) in Lakewood	
CR 629	3.61	5.81	Route 35 in Seaside Heights	Porter Avenue, Bay Boulevard, Ortley Avenue	Grand Central Avenue (Route 35) in Lavallette	Gap in route at the intersection of Route 35 on the Seaside Heights/Toms River border
CR 630	4.79	7.71	Princeton Avenue (Route 88) and Post Road (Route 88) in Brick	Princeton Avenue, Beaver Dam Road	Ocean Road (Route 88) and Herbertsville Road (CR 549 Spur) in Point Pleasant	
CR 631	3.51	5.65	Hooper Avenue (CR 549) and Brick Boulevard (CR 549) in Brick	Hooper Avenue, Brick Boulevard	Route 70 in Brick	
CR 632	6.07	9.77	Burnt Tavern Road (CR 549) and Lanes Mill Road (CR 549) in Brick	Burnt Tavern Road, 16th Avenue, Route 13, Bridge Avenue Extension, Bridge Avenue	Ocean Avenue (Route 35) in Bay Head	
CR 633	1.66	2.67	Ocean Road (Route 88) in Point Pleasant	Arnold Avenue	Ocean Avenue (CR 635) in Point Pleasant Beach	
CR 634	1.50	2.41	Herbertsville Road (CR 549 Spur) in Point Pleasant	Osborn Avenue, River Road	Route 70 in Brick	
CR 635	2.36	3.80	Route 35 in Point Pleasant Beach	Ocean Avenue, Broadway	Route 35 in Point Pleasant Beach	
CR 636	5.65	9.09	West Veterans Highway (CR 527/CR 528), East Veterans Highway (CR 527), and Cedar Swamp Road (CR 527) in Jackson	Bennetts Mills Road, Aldrich Road	East Aldrich Road at the Monmouth County line in Jackson	
CR 637	2.77	4.46	Cox Cro Road (CR 622) in Toms River	Massachusetts Avenue	Prospect Street (CR 628) in Lakewood	
CR 638	6.60	10.62	Cassville Road (CR 571) in Jackson	Freehold Road, Cedar Swamp Road, Jackson Mills Road	Jackson Mills Road (CR 23) at the Monmouth County line in Jackson	
CR 639	2.54	4.09	East Veterans Highway (CR 528/CR 547) and South Hope Chapel Road (CR 547) in Jackson	North Hope Chapel Road	County Line Road (CR 526) in Lakewood	
CR 640	8.77	14.11	Brindletown Road in Plumsted Township	Front Street, Magnolia Avenue, Archertown Road, West Colliers Mills Road, East Colliers Mills Road, Hawkin Road	Monmouth Road (CR 537) on the Plumsted/Upper Freehold/Jackson township line	
CR 641	4.28	6.89	County Line Road (CR 526) on the Lakewood/Jackson township line	Chandler Road, Hyson Road, New Prospect Road	Jackson Mills Road (CR 638) in Jackson	
CR 642 (1)	1.78	2.86	Dead end in Lacey Township	Mule Road	Pinewald–Keswick Road (CR 530) in Berkeley Township	Was to have connected to CR 642 segment on the Berkeley/Toms River township line
CR 642 (2)	1.78	2.86	Dead end in Berkeley Township	Mule Road	Route 37 in Toms River	
