= Thomas A. Mathis and J. Stanley Tunney Bridges =

Pair of bridges in New Jersey

Thomas A. Mathis Bridge J. Stanley Tunney Bridge
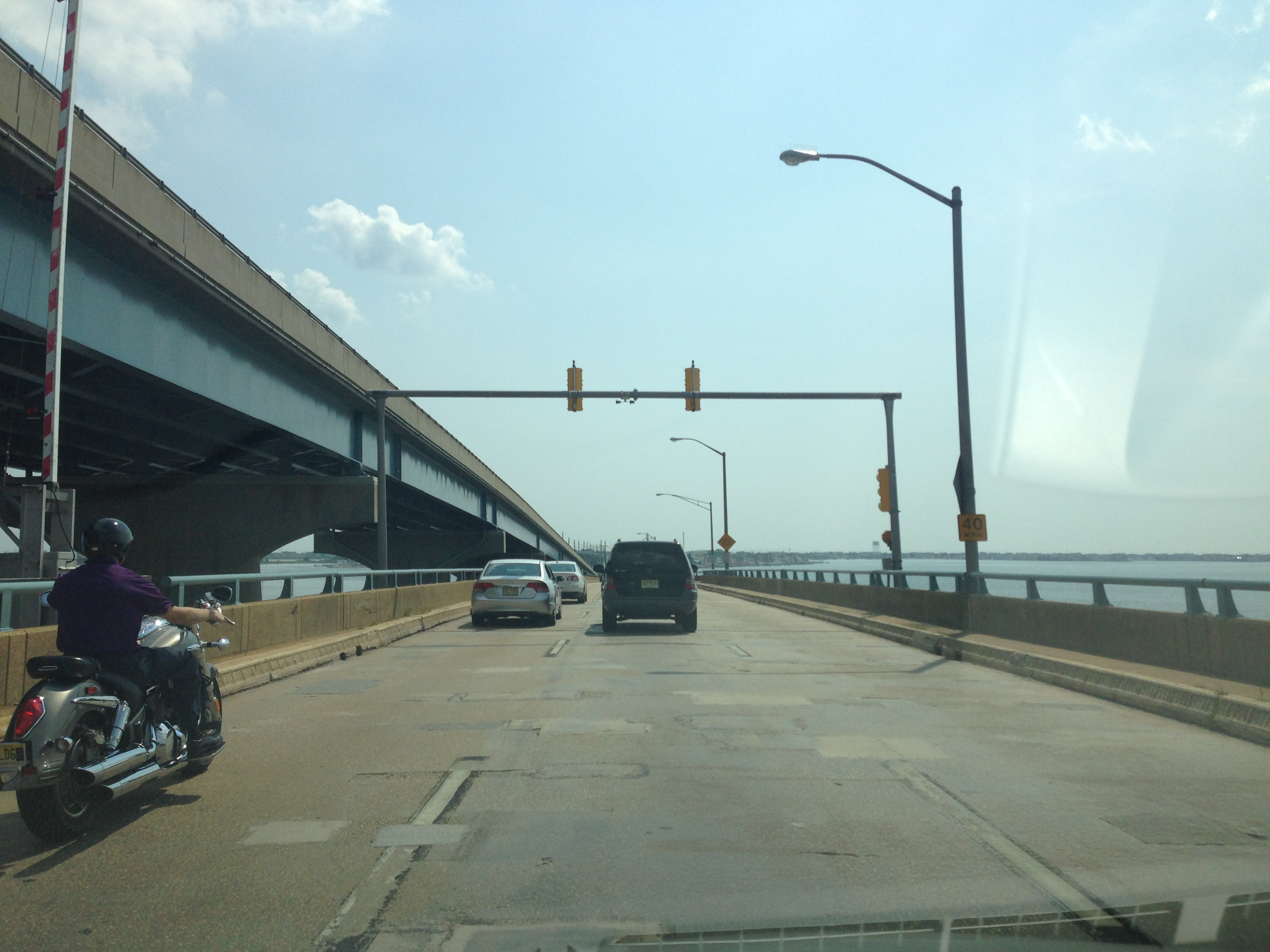
- Eastbound on the Thomas A. Mathis Bridge past the bascule span, with the high-level J. Stanley Tunney Bridge to the left
- Coordinates: 39°56′37″N 74°06′01″W
- Carries: 6 lanes of Route 37
- Crosses: Barnegat Bay with crossing through Pelican Island
- Locale: Toms River, New Jersey and Seaside Heights, New Jersey
- Official name: Thomas A. Mathis Bridge (eastbound); J. Stanley Tunney Bridge (westbound)

Characteristics
- Design: Twin beam bridges; bascule bridge (eastbound)
- Total length: 4,877.2 ft
- Width: 27.9 ft
- Longest span: 170 ft

History
- Opened: May 24, 1950 (Thomas A. Mathis Bridge, eastbound); December 15, 1972 (J. Stanley Tunney Bridge, westbound)

Location
- Interactive map of Thomas A. Mathis Bridge; J. Stanley Tunney Bridge

The Thomas A. Mathis Bridge and J. Stanley Tunney Bridge are a pair of bridges that span Barnegat Bay in Ocean County, New Jersey, connecting Route 37 in Toms River with Pelican Island and communities along the Jersey Shore on the Barnegat Peninsula. The bridges pass through Toms River and a small piece of Berkeley Township, before ending at Route 35 in Seaside Heights.

The Thomas A. Mathis Bridge was completed in 1950 to replace a narrow wooden bridge, that had served as the only connection between the mainland and the shore. It is a bascule bridge that allows ship traffic to pass under the bridge when it is raised.

The J. Stanley Tunney Bridge was completed in 1972 to carry westbound traffic, while the Mathis bridge was dedicated for vehicles traveling eastbound. The Tunney Bridge is a high level girder bridge that was designed to allow tall ships to pass under it without requiring a bridge opening. Although both bridges have three lanes, those on the Tunney Bridge are wider. Because Route 37 is one of a few links to the barrier island beaches, the bridge and the entire highway are routinely jammed with both local and tourist traffic throughout the summer months.
