= New Jersey Route 166 =

Highway in New Jersey, United States

Route 166
- Map of Route 166, which is highlighted in red

Route information
- Maintained by NJDOT
- Length: 3.73 mi (6.00 km)
- Existed: 1954–present

Major junctions
- South end: US 9 in Beachwood
- Route 37 in Toms River
- North end: G.S. Parkway / US 9 in Toms River

Location
- Country: United States
- State: New Jersey
- Counties: Ocean

Highway system
- New Jersey State Highway Routes; Interstate; US; State; Scenic Byways
← Route 165	→ Route 167

Route 166 is a short, 3.73-mile (6.00 km) state highway in Ocean County, New Jersey. The route provides an alternate alignment of U.S. Route 9 through South Toms River and Toms River. The southern terminus is at an intersection with U.S. Route 9 northbound in Beachwood, where it heads northward along Atlantic City Boulevard. The route continues until ending where U.S. Route 9 leaves the Parkway north of Toms River. US 9 itself uses the Garden State Parkway to bypass Toms River.

Route 166 is a former alignment of New Jersey Route 4, designated in 1920 and U.S. Route 9, designated in 1927 through Toms River. The highways were realigned when the Garden State Parkway was built, and the original alignment became U.S. Route 9 Alternate in the 1950s, which was eventually replaced with Route 166. The alignment has remained the same since.

== Route description ==
View north along Route 166 at Washington Street in downtown Toms River

Route 166 begins at an interchange with U.S. Route 9 northbound (Atlantic City Boulevard) in the community of South Toms River. The route heads northward along the right-of-way of Atlantic City Boulevard, progressing northward along residential homes. Paralleling to the north of U.S. Route 9, Route 166 continues, passing a war memorial in the southern portion of the business district. In the center of the community, the highway intersects with Ocean County Route 621 (Admiral Avenue). There, Route 166 turns to the northeast, running along the shoreline of the Toms River. Heading past a marina, the highway crosses on a four-lane bridge over the river and into the Township of Toms River.

After landing down on the Toms River side, Route 166 heads to the northwest, intersecting with the incomplete Herficker Boulevard. The highway turns off its right-of-way, and crosses another branch into the center of Toms River. Passing the Riverfront Landing, Route 166 intersects with the eastern/southern terminus of County Route 527 (Water Street). The highway continues northward along commercial buildings as Main Street, passing to the west of Toms River High School South and back into the residential districts. Route 166 continues northbound to an intersection with New Jersey Route 37 in Toms River. At the intersection, Route 166 switches names from Main Street to Lakewood Road, which heads northwestward. Route 166, after changing monikers, continues northwestward through the commercial and industrial portions of Toms River, intersecting with several local and county roads until a fork with Ocean County Route 623, where the highway forks at Riverside Cemetery. A short distance later, the highway begins a split parallel with the Garden State Parkway and U.S. Route 9 to the east. Route 166 then leaves the commercial and industrial districts for the residential ones soon later, crossing through several developments including Colonial Gardens. The highway continues northward, intersecting with Albert Avenue, where it returns to the commercial area. After an intersection with Briar Knoll, Route 166 divides, approaching Interchange 83 on the Garden State Parkway, where the designation terminates. The right-of-way continues northward as U.S. Route 9.

== History ==
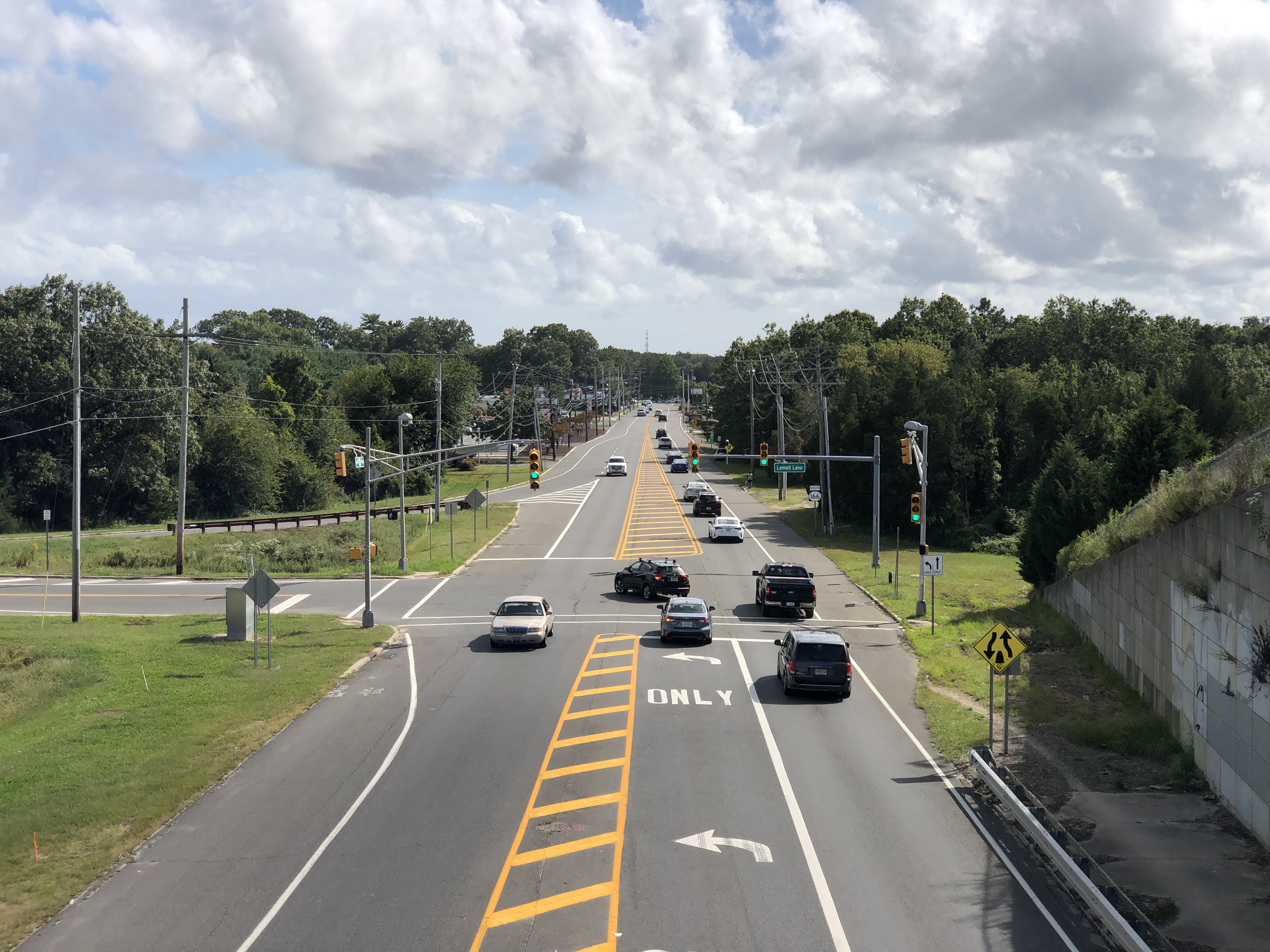
View southbound along Route 166 from the Garden State Parkway in Toms River

The alignment of Route 166 was originally part of Route 4 prior to 1927, designated from Absecon to Rahway. This designation remained in place for seven years, until the 1927 New Jersey state highway renumbering, which remained part of an extended Route 4. A year prior to the state highway renumbering, the alignment of Route 4 was also co-designated as part of U.S. Route 9, which had been assigned as part of a nationwide system. Route 4 remained intact concurrent with Route 9 until the state highway renumbering on January 1, 1953. On that day, Route 4 was truncated back to Fort Lee in Bergen County, and the alignment became only U.S. Route 9. A bypass was built of the Route 9 alignment in the 1950s along with construction of the Garden State Parkway, which was completed soon after. The route currently Route 166 became U.S. Route 9 Alternate by 1954, remaining for several years, when it was decommissioned in place for Route 166. The route has remained intact since.

== Major intersections ==
The entire route is in Ocean County.

Location	mi	km	Destinations	Notes
South Toms River	0.00	0.00	US 9 (Atlantic City Boulevard) – Bayville, Atlantic City	Southern terminus
South Toms River	1.11	1.79	CR 530 west (Main Street)	Eastern terminus of CR 530
Toms River	1.15	1.85	CR 527 north / CR 549 north (Water Street)	Southern termini of CR 527 and CR 549
Toms River	1.97	3.17	Route 37 – Lakehurst, Seaside Heights	
Toms River	3.73	6.00	G.S. Parkway / US 9 (Lakewood Road)	Northern terminus; exit 83 on G.S. Parkway
1.000 mi = 1.609 km; 1.000 km = 0.621 mi
