= County Route 547 (New Jersey) =

County highway in New Jersey, U.S.

County Route 547
- CR 547 highlighted in red, CR 547 Spur in blue

Route information
- Length: 30.36 mi (48.86 km)

Major junctions
- South end: Route 70 in Lakehurst
- US 9 in Lakewood Township; I-195 in Howell Township; Route 33 / Route 34 in Wall Township; Route 18 in Eatontown; Route 36 in Eatontown; Route 35 in Eatontown; Route 71 in Eatontown; Route 36 in West Long Branch
- North end: Broadway and Myrtle Avenue in Long Branch

Location
- Country: United States
- State: New Jersey
- Counties: Ocean, Monmouth

Highway system
- County routes in New Jersey; 500-series routes
← CR 546	→ CR 548

County Route 547 (CR 547) is a county highway in the U.S. state of New Jersey. The highway extends 30.36 miles (48.86 km) from Route 70 in Lakehurst to the intersection of Broadway and Myrtle Avenue in Long Branch. Near its southern terminus, it passes the East Gate of the Lakehurst Maxfield Field portion of Joint Base McGuire–Dix–Lakehurst, known as Lakehurst Naval Air Station in the past, and the site of the crash of the Hindenburg in 1937.

== Route description ==
=== Ocean County ===
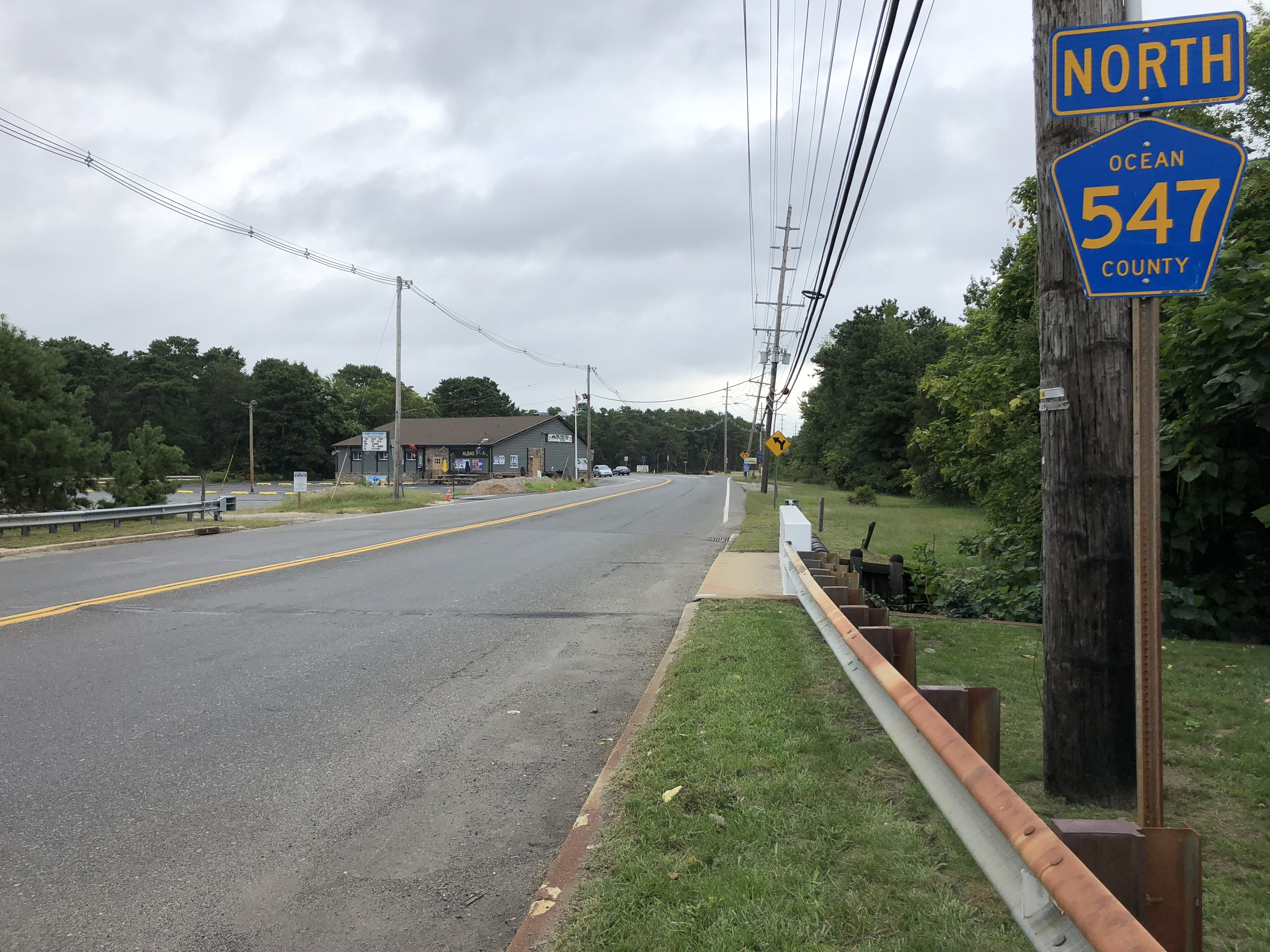
CR 547 northbound past its southern terminus at Route 70 in Lakehurst

CR 547 begins at an intersection with Route 70 in Lakehurst, Ocean County, heading northeast on two-lane undivided Ridgeway Road. Immediately after beginning, the route crosses the Manasquan Brook into Manchester and turns north on South Hope Chapel Road, running through forested areas of the Pine Barrens to the east of the Lakehurst Maxfield Field naval station. CR 547 is briefly a four-lane divided highway as it passes an entrance to the naval station before narrowing back to a two-lane undivided road and entering more dense forests as it comes to the intersection of Ridgeway Road (CR 571). From this point, the route continues as South Hope Chapel Road before continuing into Jackson, running northeast through more woods with occasional development, crossing an abandoned railroad right-of-way before turning north and intersecting with Whitesville Road (CR 527) near homes and businesses. Past this intersection, CR 547 continues north through wooded areas of residences before coming to an intersection with East Veterans Highway (CR 528) near businesses.

At this point, CR 547 turns east to run concurrently with CR 528 on East Veterans Highway; CR 639 continues north on North Hope Chapel Road. The two routes continues through residential and commercial development, intersecting with Cross Street (CR 626) before crossing into Lakewood. At this point, CR 528/CR 547 turns northeast into wooded residential neighborhoods. In this area, the route turns east onto Central Avenue and passes more homes before crossing Lake Carasaljo and coming to an intersection with US Route 9 (US 9). At this point, CR 528 continues northeast on Hurley Avenue, and CR 547 turns north to follow US 9 on Madison Avenue, crossing the Metedeconk River, from which Lake Carasaljo is formed. After intersecting with Main Street (Route 88), Madison Avenue continues north through the commercial and residential center of Lakewood as a four-lane undivided road; CR 547 splits from US 9 by turning east onto two-lane 8th Street. The route passes through residential areas before splitting from 8th Street by turning northeast onto Squankum Road. Signage along US 9 shows CR 547 leaving the concurrency at 9th Street. Along this stretch, CR 547 runs through wooded areas of homes, crossing the intersection of East County Line Road (CR 526).

=== Monmouth County ===
Crossing the Metedeconk River again, CR 547 enters Howell in Monmouth County, becoming Lakewood–Farmingdale Road, and continues through a mix of homes, businesses, and woods as it crosses the Southern Secondary railroad line operated by the Delaware and Raritan River Railroad. Farther northeast, the road continues into a mix of farmland, woodland, and residences as it reaches an intersection with Herbertsville Road (CR 549) and Old Tavern Road (CR 21). After this, CR 547 turns north and the lanes split as it comes to a cloverleaf interchange with Interstate 195 (I-195). The lanes rejoin as the route comes to an intersection with Allaire Road (CR 524) and Squankum–Yellowbrook Road (CR 524A), at which point CR 524 turns north to join CR 547. The two routes continue north through wooded areas of homes and businesses on Lakewood-Farmingdale Road, intersecting with Belmar Boulevard (CR 18) before entering Farmingdale and turning northwest. The road becomes Main Street and passes residences before crossing the Southern Secondary into business areas. CR 547 splits from CR 524 by heading northeast on Asbury Avenue, passing some homes before crossing back into Howell. The route passes a mix of woodland and residential neighborhoods before making a turn to the east on Asbury Road and crossing the Southern Secondary again. CR 547 enters Wall Township and runs through wooded areas of industry before intersecting with Route 33 and Route 34 at the Collingwood Circle.

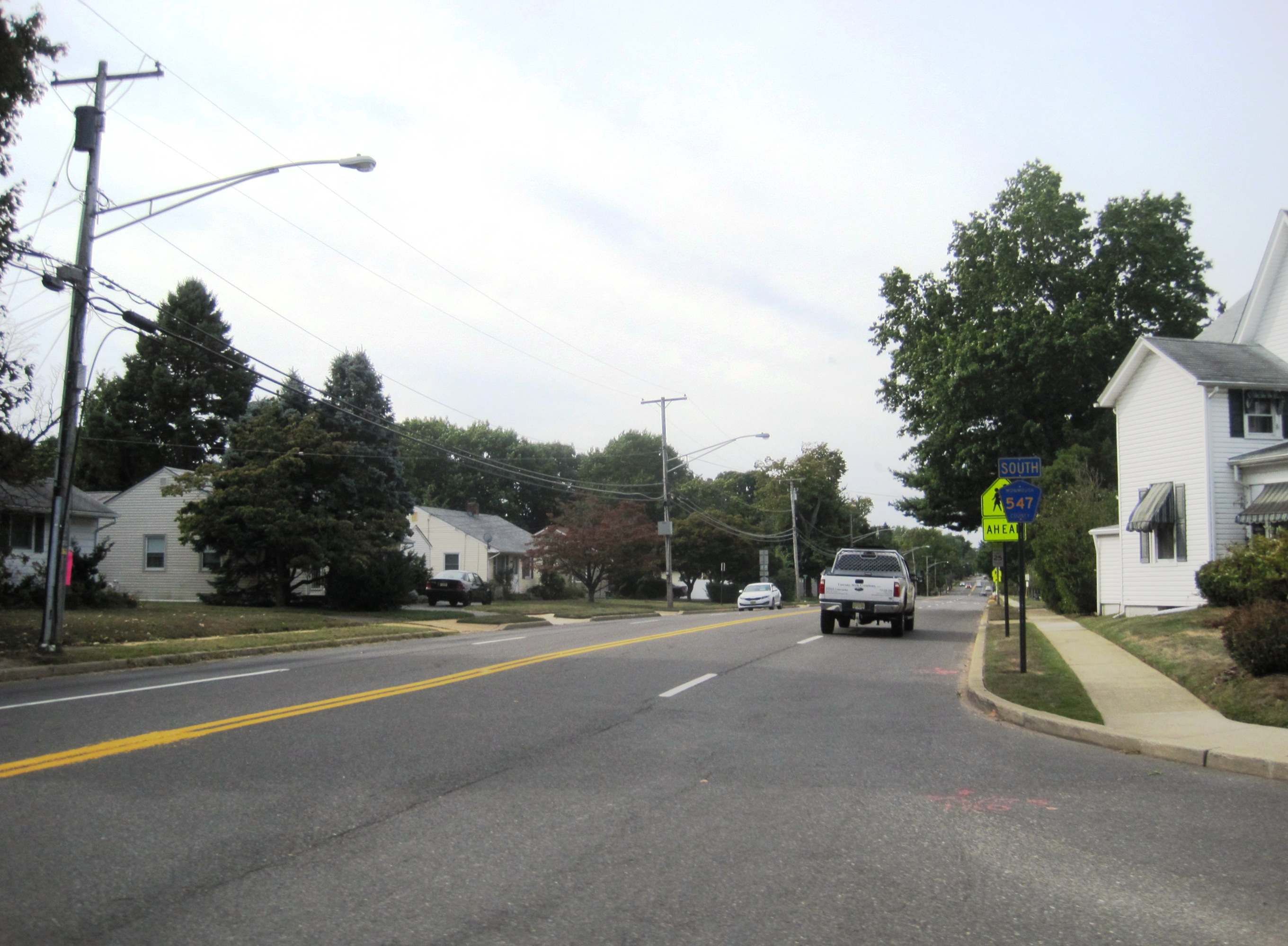
Looking south from CR 547's westernmost intersection with Route 71 (currently signed as its northern terminus)

CR 547 heads east for a brief concurrency with four-lane Route 33 after the circle before turning northeast onto four-lane undivided Shafto Road. South of this intersection, Monmouth County maintains Wyckoff Road as a section of CR 547 for 0.45 miles (0.72 km) to Route 34. The road continues into Tinton Falls and passes through a mix of farms and woods before continuing into forested areas with some commercial development. Upon crossing the intersection of Asbury Avenue (CR 16), the road runs between Naval Weapons Station Earle to the west and wooded residential and commercial development to the east. CR 547 passes through dense forests before intersecting with Wayside Road (CR 38) and passing under the Garden State Parkway. The road intersects with Wayside Road (CR 38) again after and enters Eatontown at the intersection of Hope Road (CR 51), where the name becomes Wyckoff Road. A short distance later, the route comes to a partial interchange providing access to and from the southbound direction of the Route 18 freeway before heading into wooded residential neighborhoods. CR 547 widens to a divided highway as it passes the Monmouth Mall and comes to an intersection with Route 36. The road passes more businesses as it becomes undivided and comes to the intersection of Route 35 a short distance later. CR 547 continues past more homes before it reaches an intersection with Broad Street (Route 71).

CR 547 runs concurrently along Route 71 (Broad Street) heading east before the road (whose name changes to Eatontown Boulevard) becomes the border between Oceanport to the north and Eatontown to the south at Main Street. CR 547 splits from Route 71 at Monmouth Road by continuing east along Eatontown Boulevard past more homes. The road turns southeast and enters West Long Branch, becoming Broadway and crossing the intersection of Route 36 in commercial areas. CR 547 continues past a mix of homes and businesses, intersecting with Locust Avenue (CR 15) and Oceanport Avenue (CR 11) before continuing into Long Branch and reaching its northern terminus at Myrtle Avenue. Past the northern terminus, Broadway continues through Long Branch towards the Atlantic Ocean.

== History ==
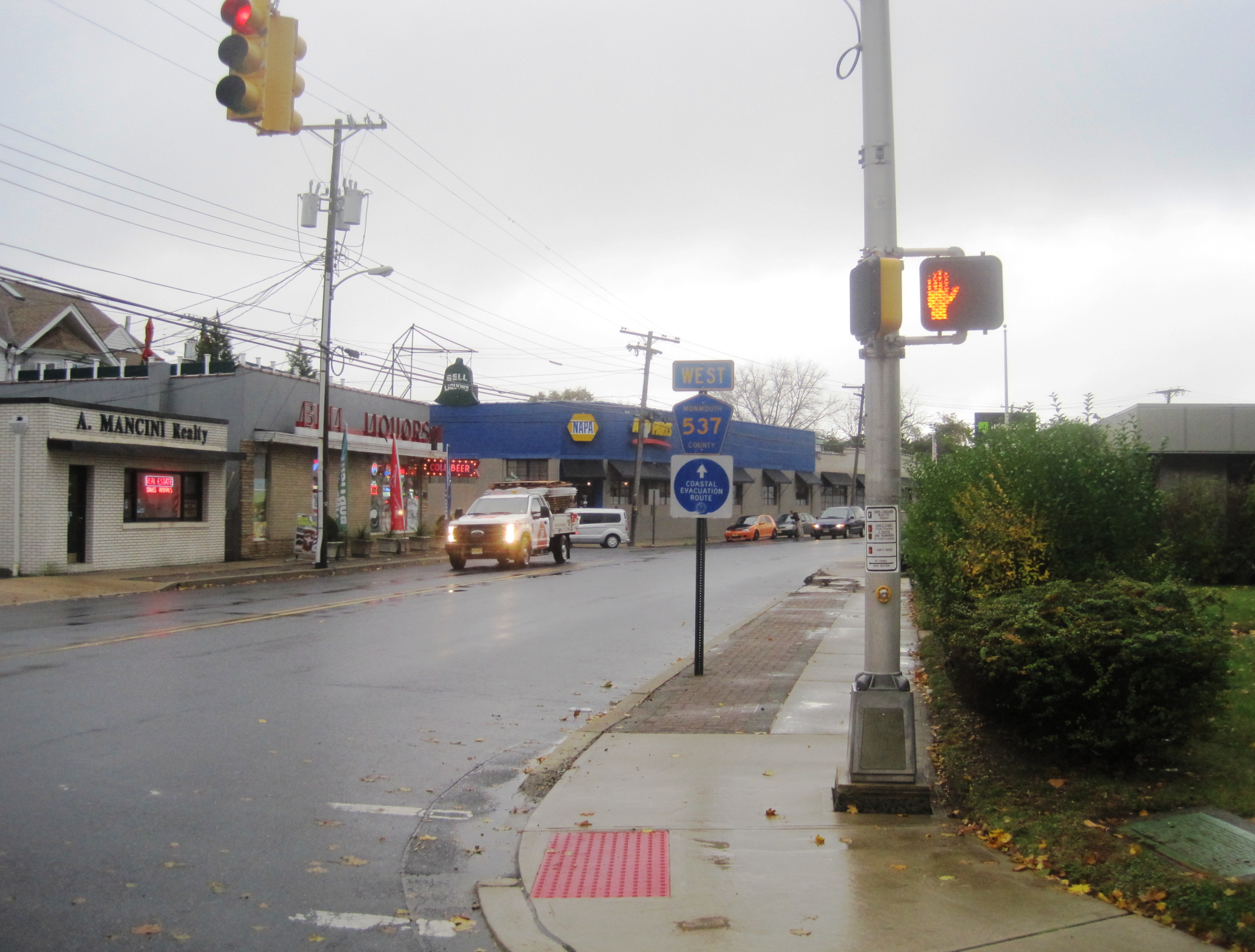
The legislative northern terminus of CR 547 in Long Branch still signed as CR 537 as of November 2022

Prior to 2017, CR 547 ended at Route 71 and Broad Street (CR 537) in Eatontown. On February 23, 2017, the Monmouth County Board of Chosen Freeholders extended CR 547 along Route 71 and the former routing of CR 537 to Long Branch due to CR 537's realignment through Fort Monmouth. However as of November 2022, signage for CR 537 still appears along the recently extended section of CR 547 from Route 71 to Long Branch.

== Major intersections ==
County	Location	mi	km	Destinations	Notes
Ocean	Lakehurst	0.00	0.00	Route 70 – Shore Points, Camden Center Street – Lakehurst	
Ocean	Manchester Township	1.70	2.74	CR 571 (Ridgeway Road)	
Ocean	Jackson Township	4.43	7.13	CR 527 (Whitesville Road) – Plumsted, Toms River	
Ocean	Jackson Township	5.54	8.92	CR 528 west (East Veterans Highway) – Plumsted CR 639 north (North Hope Chapel Road) – Freehold	South end of CR 528 concurrency
Ocean	Lakewood Township	8.46	13.62	US 9 south (River Avenue) – Toms River CR 528 east (Hurley Avenue) – Mantoloking	Northern end of CR 528 concurrency; southern end of US 9 concurrency
Ocean	Lakewood Township	8.70	14.00	Route 88 east (Main Street) – Brick	Western terminus of Route 88
Ocean	Lakewood Township	9.28	14.93	US 9 north (Madison Avenue)	Northern end of US 9 concurrency
Ocean	Lakewood Township	10.18	16.38	CR 526 (East County Line Road) to G.S. Parkway	
Monmouth	Howell Township	14.67	23.61	CR 549 east (Herbertsville Road) CR 21 west (Old Tavern Road)	Western terminus of CR 549
Monmouth	Howell Township	15.0	24.1	I-195 – Trenton, Shore Points	Exit 31 on I-195
Monmouth	Howell Township	15.33	24.67	CR 524A north (Squankum–Yellowbrook Road) CR 524 east (Allaire Road) – Allaire State Park	Southern end of 524 concurrency; southern terminus of CR 524A
Monmouth	Farmingdale	17.60	28.32	CR 524 west (Main Street)	Northern end of CR 524 concurrency
Monmouth	Wall Township	20.44	32.89	Route 33 west / Route 34 – Freehold, Matawan, Brielle	Southern end of Route 33 concurrency; Collingwood Circle
Monmouth	Wall Township	20.79	33.46	Route 33 east to G.S. Parkway – Neptune Wyckoff Road	Northern end of Route 33 concurrency
Monmouth	Eatontown	25.78	41.49	Route 18 south – Point Pleasant	Access from northbound CR 547 to southbound Route 18 and from northbound Route 18 to southbound CR 547 only; exit 13A on Route 18
Monmouth	Eatontown	27.08	43.58	Route 36 to Route 18 / G.S. Parkway – Tinton Falls, Long Branch	
Monmouth	Eatontown	27.37	44.05	Route 35	
Monmouth	Eatontown	28.29	45.53	Route 71 north (Broad Street)	Southern end of Route 71 concurrency
Monmouth	Eatontown–Oceanport line	28.51	45.88	Route 71 south (Monmouth Road) – Asbury Park	Northern end of Route 71 concurrency
Monmouth	West Long Branch	29.50– 29.61	47.48– 47.65	Route 36 to G.S. Parkway – Tinton Falls, Highlands	
Monmouth	Long Branch	30.36	48.86	Myrtle Avenue, Broadway	
1.000 mi = 1.609 km; 1.000 km = 0.621 mi: Concurrency terminus; Incomplete access

== CR 547 Spur ==
County Route 547 Spur
- Location: Wall Township
- Length: 0.45 mi (720 m)

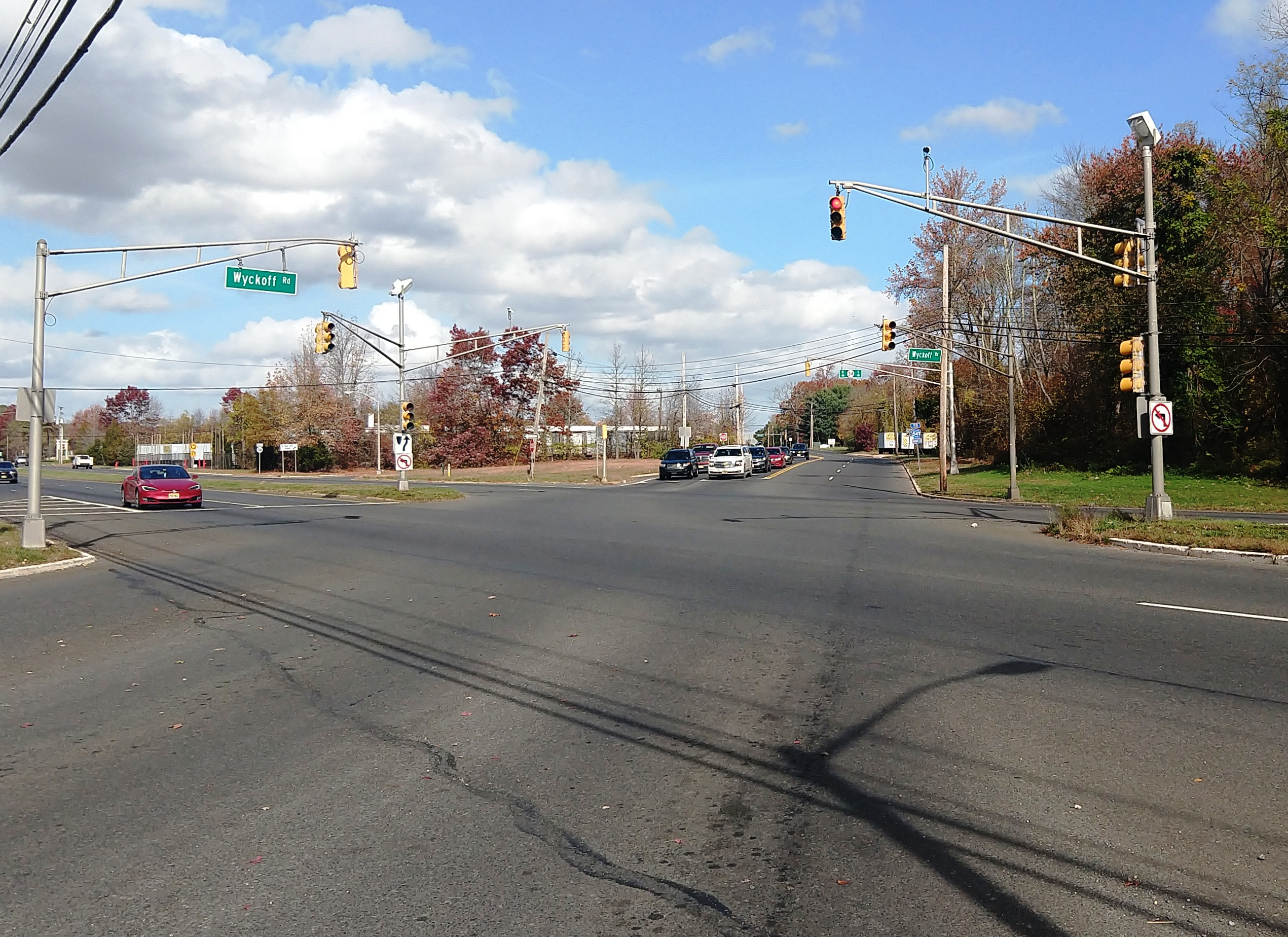
Southern terminus of CR 547 Spur at Route 34, note the "To CR 547 North" sign in the background

County Route 547 Spur (CR 547 Spur) is a 0.45-mile-long (0.72 km) county-maintained section of Wyckoff Road in Wall Township, Monmouth County. The four-lane road runs between Route 34 and Route 33 and CR 547 and is flanked by retail and office buildings on both sides for most of its length. Only two numbered signs appear along the road: A "To CR 547" near its southern end and a sign blade on a traffic signal noting the road as just "CR 547", consistent with the Monmouth County Road Plan which calls this a part of CR 547.
