= County Route 549 (New Jersey) =

County highway in New Jersey, U.S.

County Route 549
- CR 549 highlighted in red; spur routes highlighted in blue

Route information
- Length: 17.8 mi (28.6 km)

Major junctions
- South end: Route 166 / CR 527 in Toms River
- Route 37 in Toms River; CR 571 in Toms River; CR 549 Spur in Toms River; CR 528 in Brick Township; Route 70 in Brick Township; G.S. Parkway in Brick Township; Route 88 in Lakewood Township; CR 526 in Lakewood Township; CR 549 Spur in Brick Township
- West end: CR 21 / CR 547 in Howell Township

Location
- Country: United States
- State: New Jersey
- Counties: Ocean, Monmouth

Highway system
- County routes in New Jersey; 500-series routes
← CR 548	→ CR 550

County Route 549 (CR 549) is a county highway in the U.S. state of New Jersey. The highway extends 17.8 miles (28.6 km) from Main Street (Route 166) and Water Street (CR 527) in Toms River to Lakewood-Farmimgdale Road (CR 547) and Old Tavern Road (CR 21) in Howell Township. The highway is the only 500-series route left with two separate spur routes.

The highway passes through Ocean and Monmouth counties and is maintained by each respective county, but there are several indications that the highway at one point may have been or was originally planned to be state maintained. There are a few mileposts left along the southern section of the highway that have a "NJDT" label on the bottom right corner. Also, the only at-grade cloverleaf in New Jersey exists on CR 549, and on the bridges there exists a stamp in the concrete that reads "1975".

CR 549 mostly travels through Ocean County. The highway makes frequent turns onto separate roads. The route in its northern segment is a two-lane, rural road, but it becomes a four-lane arterial after crossing the Garden State Parkway all the way to Toms River. It is a major link between the townships of Toms River and Brick Township. As the route is plagued by chronic congestion, the county has invested millions of dollars into upgrading this corridor. The most recent improvement was from Cedar Bridge Avenue (CR 528) to Beaverson Boulevard. It included widening, signal modification, and the extension of Beaverson Boulevard to meet Old Hooper Avenue. Ongoing improvements are being made between Beaverson Boulevard and Church Road, where widening and reconstruction should help alleviate some congestion in that area.

== Route description ==
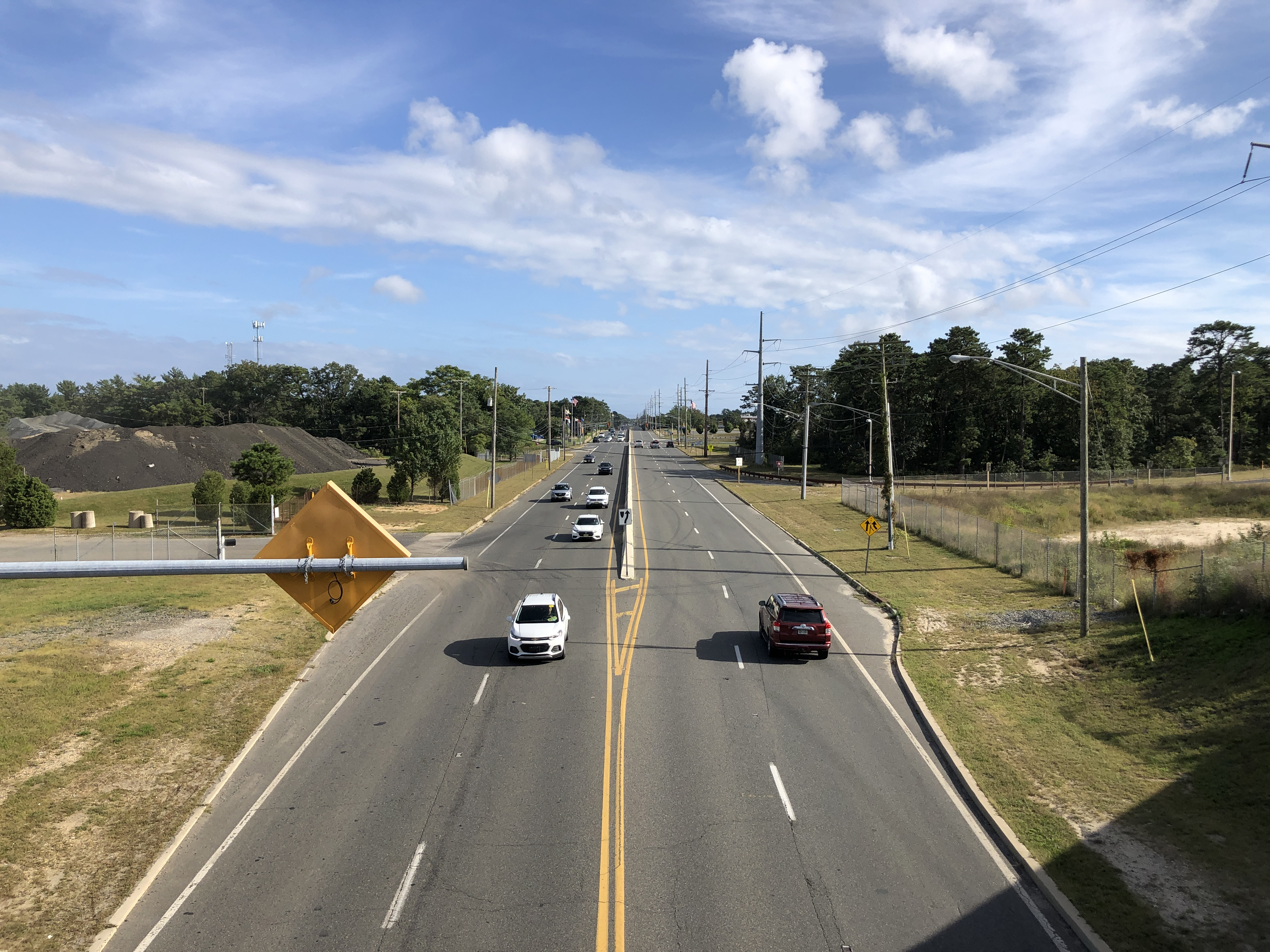
View southbound along CR 549 from the Garden State Parkway in Brick

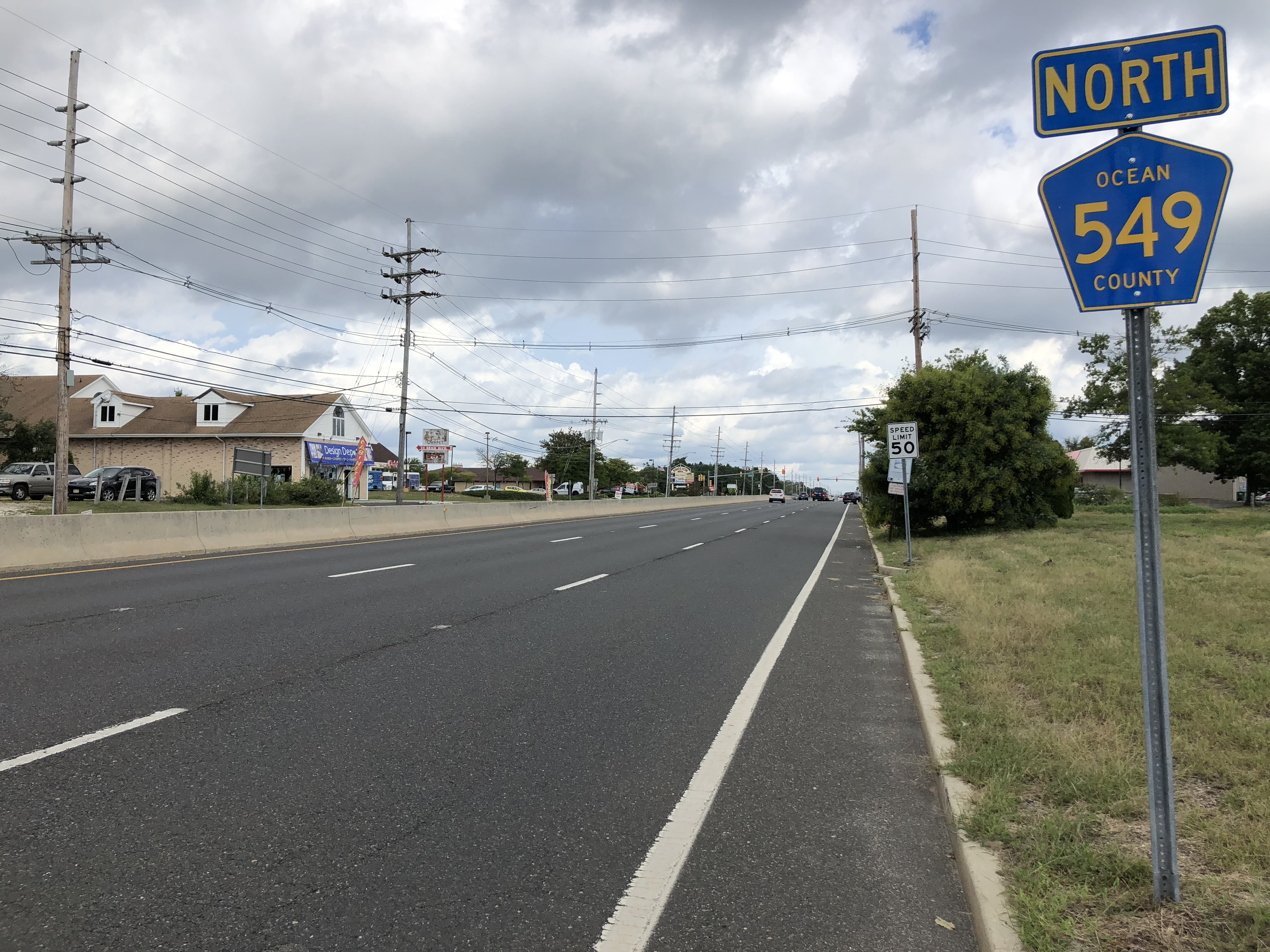
CR 549 northbound past CR 631 in Brick Township

CR 549 begins at an intersection of Main Street (Route 166) and Water Street (CR 527) in Toms River, Ocean County, heading east on four-lane undivided Water Street. The road runs through the commercial downtown of Toms River a short distance to the north of the Toms River. The route turns left and north onto Hooper Avenue, which passes through more of the downtown area before heading into residential areas and narrowing to two lanes. Upon crossing the intersection of Route 37, CR 549 becomes a six-lane divided highway with jughandles that passes through commercial areas, narrowing to four lanes. The road heads to the west of the Seacourt Pavilion shopping center and intersects with Bay Avenue (CR 571) at an at-grade cloverleaf interchange. Following this, the roadway passes to the west of the Ocean County Mall, widening to six lanes again. The road narrows back to four lanes at the intersection of Oak Avenue (CR 94) as it passes more shopping centers, turning more to the northeast. CR 549 enters wooded areas as it passes College Drive (CR 36) and the entrance to Ocean County College and comes to an intersection of Fischer Boulevard (CR 549 Spur). Past this intersection, the route makes a turn to the north again and enters Silverton and more commercial areas, crossing the intersection of Church Road/Kettle Creek Road (CR 620) before entering Brick Township. Here, CR 549 becomes Brick Boulevard and intersects with Hooper Avenue (CR 631) before continuing past more development with three northbound lanes and two southbound lanes. After the intersection of Beaverson Boulevard (CR 66), the road carries two lanes in each direction as it reaches the intersections of Drum Point Road (CR 624) and Cedar Bridge Avenue (CR 528), turning more to the northeast. CR 549 comes to an intersection with Brick Boulevard (CR 631) again, at which point CR 549 splits from Brick Boulevard by turning northwest on Chambers Bridge Road while CR 631 continues north on Brick Boulevard. The four-lane undivided road passes shopping centers and crosses the intersection of Route 70. After this intersection, CR 549 widens into a four-lane divided highway again and passes more businesses, turning into an undivided road again as it comes to a partial interchange with the Garden State Parkway that has access to the southbound direction of the parkway and from the northbound direction of the parkway.

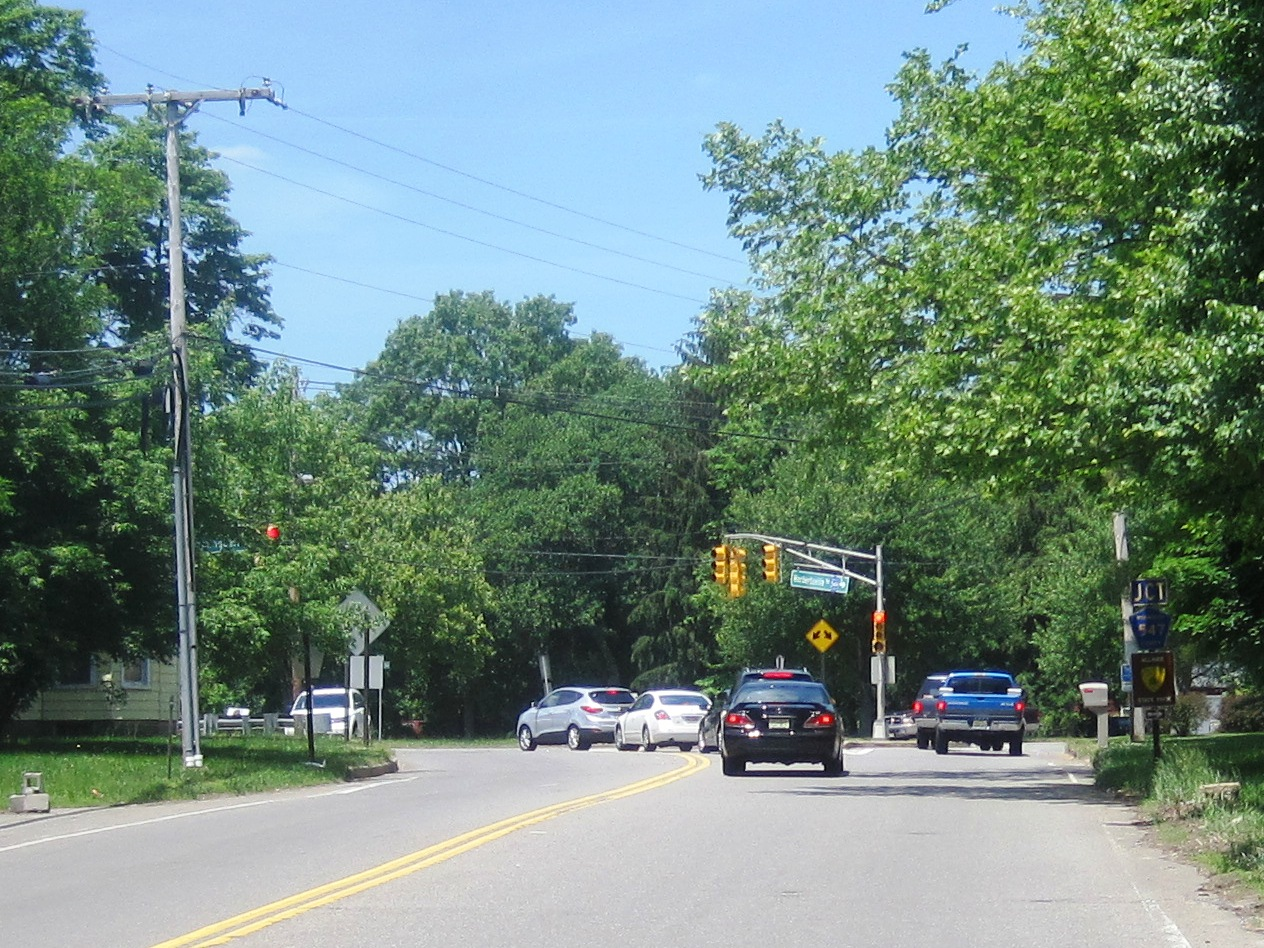
Western terminus of CR 549 at CR 547

Immediately after this interchange, the road crosses the Metedeconk River (South Branch) into Lakewood and turns north, coming to the intersection of Ocean Avenue (Route 88). At this point, CR 549 becomes two-lane undivided Lanes Mill Road and enters forested areas with some homes, turning northeast as it comes to the intersection of Lanes Mill Road (CR 526). Immediately after, the route crosses the Metedeconk River (North Branch) back into Brick and passes more residential and business areas, heading west of a park and ride lot, before intersecting with Burnt Tavern Road (CR 63). At this intersection, CR 549 turns east onto Burnt Tavern Road and has an interchange with the Garden State Parkway again, this time providing full access. After the parkway, CR 549 turns north onto Lanes Mill Road while CR 632 continuing east on Burnt Tavern Road. The Brick Park and Ride serving NJ Transit buses to New York City is located along the ramp from CR 549 to the northbound Garden State Parkway. The road passes residential subdivisions and continues northeast onto Sally Ike Road while CR 12 heads northeast along Lanes Mill Road. The route comes to an intersection of Herbertsville Road (CR 549 Spur), and CR 549 turns northwest onto Herbertsville Road while CR 14 continues north on Sally Ike Road. The route crosses into Wall Township, Monmouth County, and passes under the Garden State Parkway before entering wooded areas with some homes. The road enters Howell and intersects with Allenwood-Squankum Road (CR 21), running northwest through wooded areas of Allaire State Park. CR 549 comes to its western terminus at the intersection of Lakewood-Farmingdale Road (CR 547) while CR 21 continues northwest on Old Tavern Road.

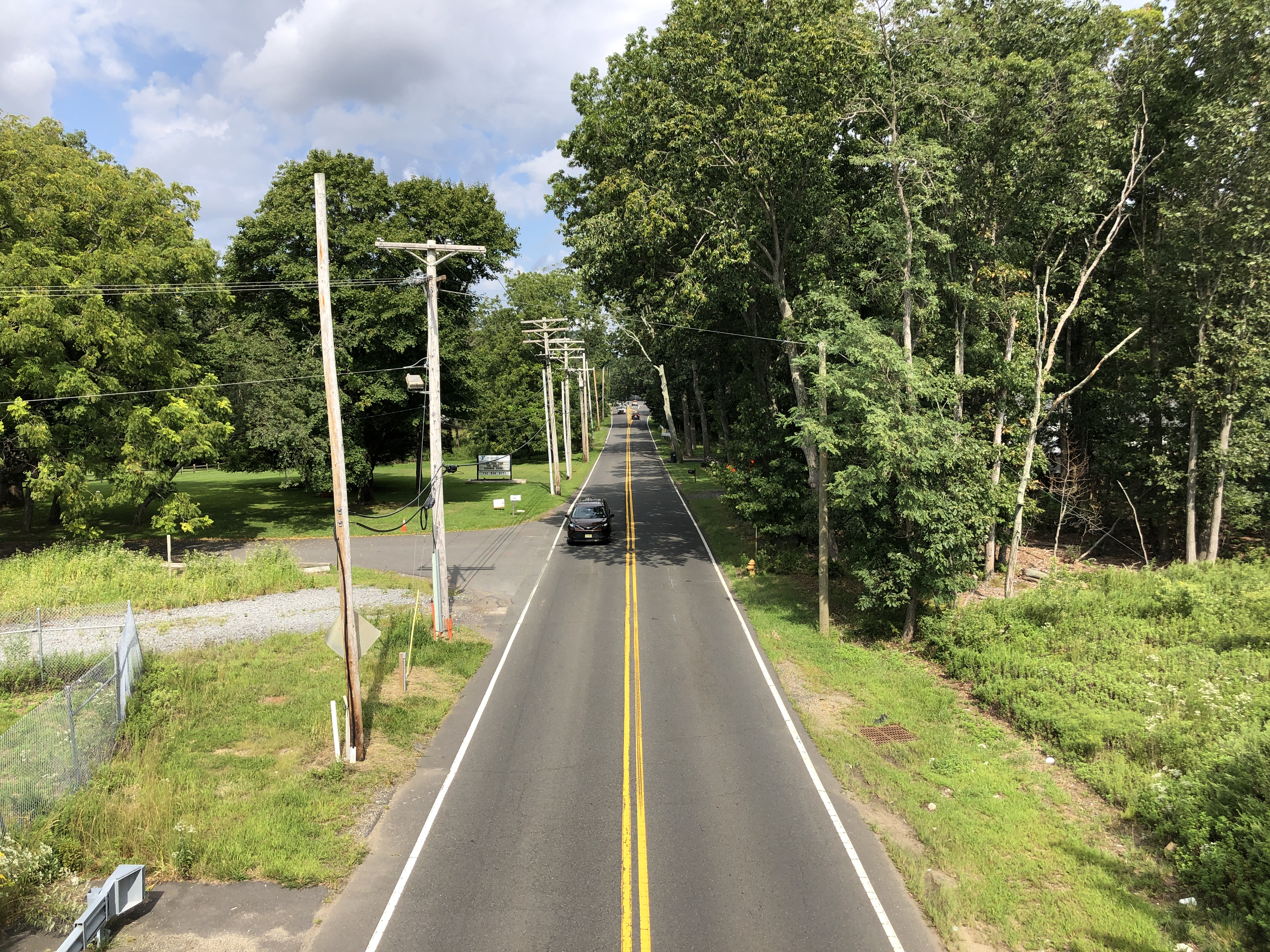
View westbound along CR 549 from the Garden State Parkway in Wall

In Monmouth County, CR 549 is signed as east–west.

== History ==
The Fischer Boulevard Extension was proposed in the late 1990s to alleviate severe traffic congestion on Hooper Avenue (CR 549) from Toms River into Brick Township. It would have continued Fischer Boulevard (CR 549 Spur) north through undeveloped land near Ocean County College, before connecting with Church Road near its intersection of Bay Avenue near the Garden State Parkway overpass. The extension would have moderated traffic on CR 549 as traffic from the northern and western parts of Toms River could use the extension to get to the shore area. Since Fischer Boulevard ends at its intersection with Hooper Avenue, all traffic has to take Hooper to get to their destination whether it is to Brick or the western sections of Toms River. The plan has been in the works but has been stalled for several years.

== Major intersections ==
County	Location	mi	km	Destinations	Notes
Ocean	Toms River	0.0	0.0	Route 166 (Main Street) / CR 527 north (Water Street)	Southern terminus; southern terminus of CR 527
Ocean	Toms River	1.1	1.8	Route 37 to G.S. Parkway – Lakehurst, Seaside Heights	
Ocean	Toms River	2.3	3.7	CR 571 (Bay Avenue)	At-grade cloverleaf
Ocean	Toms River	4.66	7.50	CR 549 Spur south (Fischer Boulevard)	Southern terminus of CR 549 Spur
Ocean	Brick Township	8.4	13.5	CR 528 (Cedar Bridge Avenue) – Lakewood Township, Mantoloking	
Ocean	Brick Township	8.9	14.3	Route 70 – Lakehurst, Brielle	
Ocean	Brick Township	10.4	16.7	G.S. Parkway south	Exit 90 on Garden State Parkway
Ocean	Lakewood Township	10.6	17.1	Route 88 (Ocean Avenue) – Lakewood Township, Bay Head	
Ocean	Lakewood Township	11.4	18.3	CR 526 west (Lanes Mill Road)	Eastern terminus of CR 526
Ocean	Brick Township	12.1	19.5	G.S. Parkway	Exits 91A-B on Garden State Parkway
Ocean	Brick Township	14.3	23.0	CR 549 Spur south (Herbertsville Road)	Northern terminus of CR 549 Spur
Monmouth	Howell Township	17.8	28.6	CR 21 west (Old Tavern Road) / CR 547 (Lakewood–Farmingdale Road)	Western terminus; eastern terminus of CR 21
1.000 mi = 1.609 km; 1.000 km = 0.621 mi: Tolled

== CR 549 Spur ==
=== Southern segment ===
County Route 549 Spur
- Location: Toms River
- Length: 4.0 mi (6.4 km)

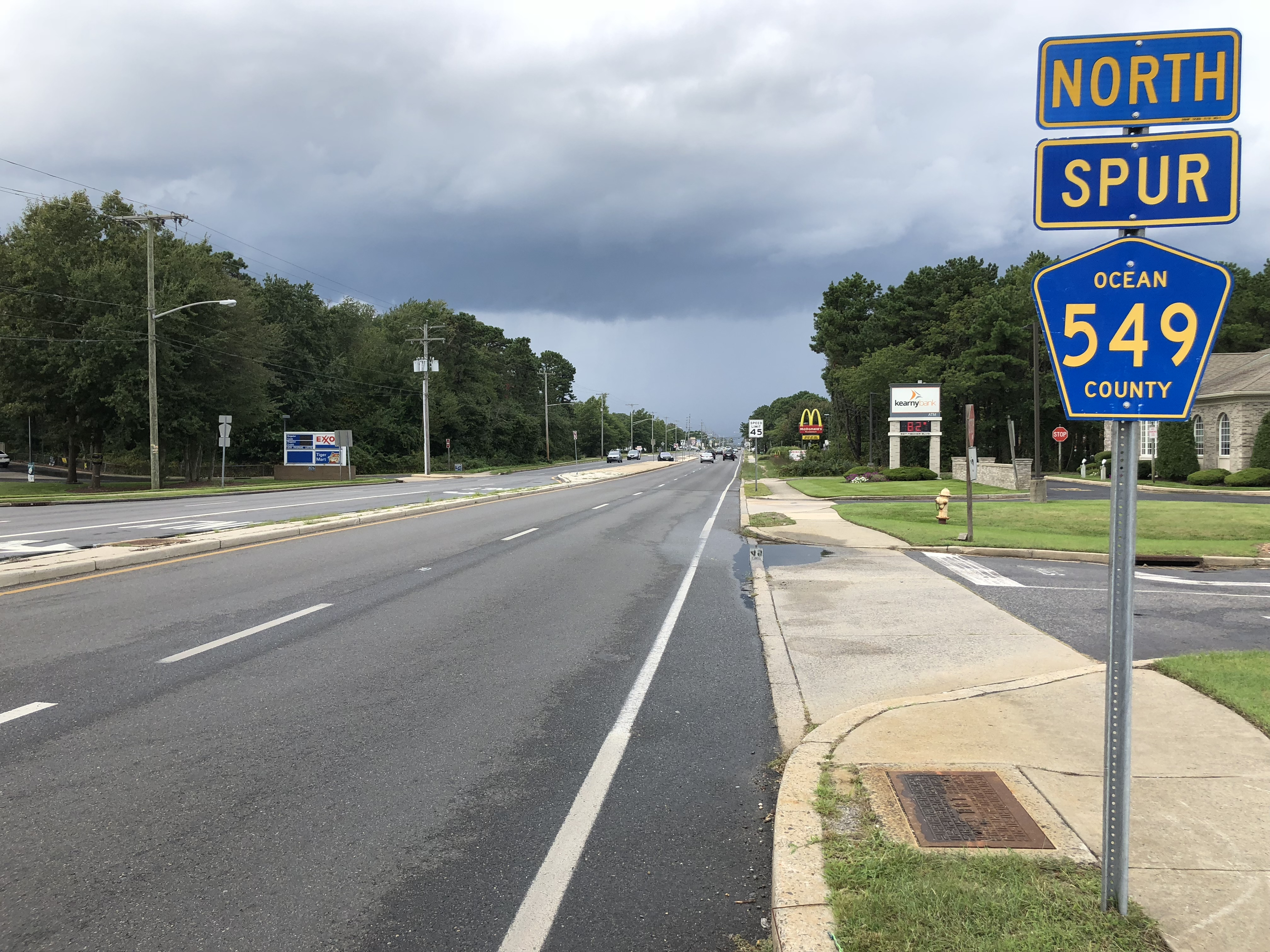
CR 549 Spur northbound at CR 571 in Toms River

County Route 549 Spur (CR 549 Spur) is a county highway in the U.S. state of New Jersey. The southern segment extends 4.0 miles (6.4 km) from Route 37 to Hooper Avenue (CR 549) in Toms River. The southern spur runs along Fischer Boulevard and with the recent completion of a widening project, the highway has been fully reconstructed from Bay Avenue (CR 571) to Hooper Avenue (CR 549). Fischer Boulevard is a major commuting route in Toms River.

Major intersections
The entire route is in Toms River, Ocean County.

mi	km	Destinations	Notes
0.0	0.0	Route 37 – Seaside Heights, Toms River, Lakehurst CR 571 begins	Southern terminus; southern terminus of CR 571
1.4	2.3	CR 571 west (Bay Avenue); Bay Avenue	Northern end of CR 571 concurrency
4.0	6.4	CR 549 (Hooper Avenue)	Northern terminus
1.000 mi = 1.609 km; 1.000 km = 0.621 mi: Concurrency terminus

=== Northern segment ===
County Route 549 Spur
- Location: Point Pleasant–Brick Township
- Length: 3.9 mi (6.3 km)

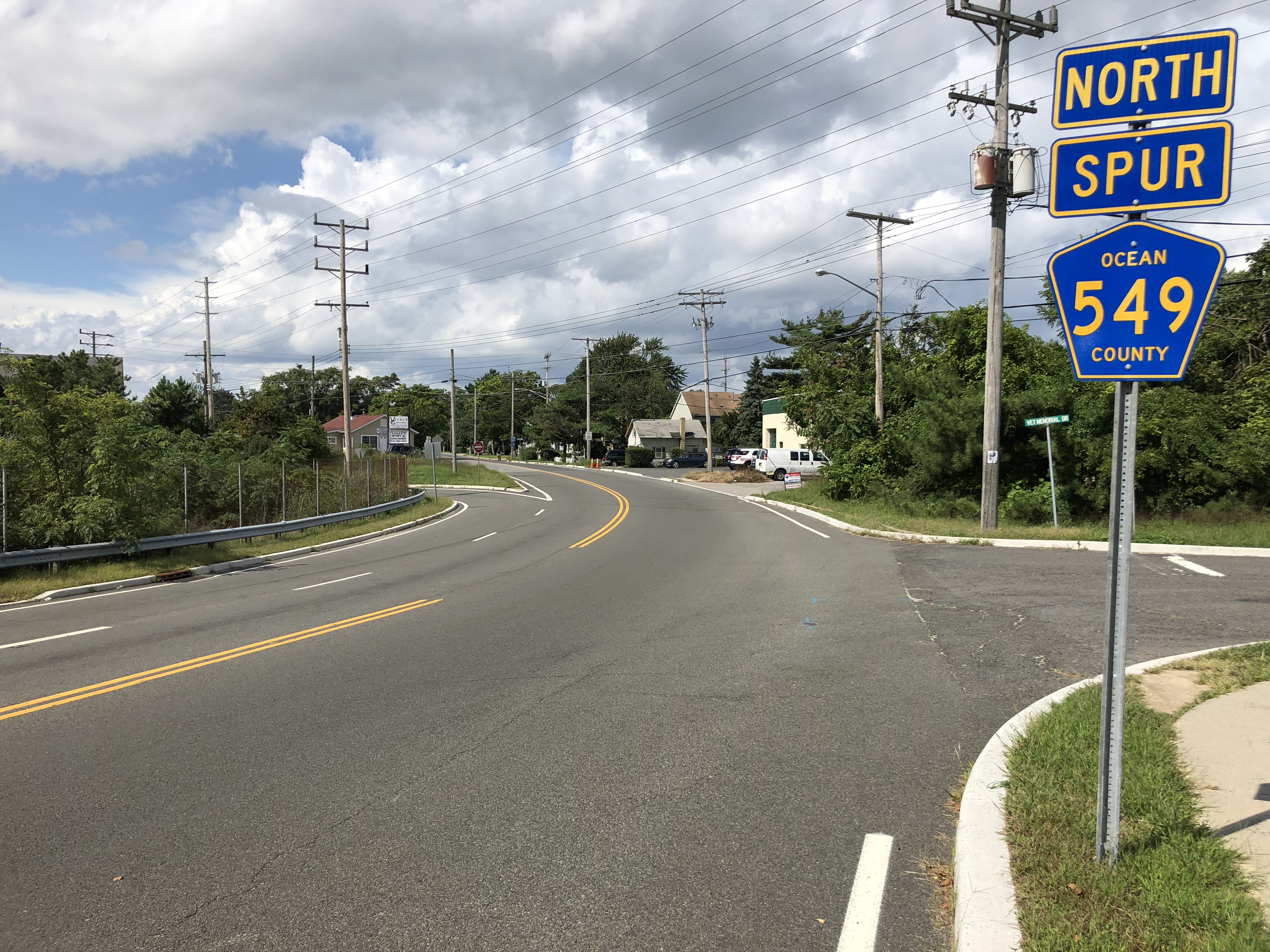
CR 549 Spur northbound (Herbertsville Road)

County Route 549 Spur (CR 549 Spur) is a county highway in the U.S. state of New Jersey. The northern segment extends 3.9 miles (6.3 km) from Route 88 and Beaver Dam Road (CR 630) in Point Pleasant to Sally Ike Road (CR 549) in Brick Township. The northern spur runs along Herbertsville Road and is a two-lane road for its entire length, except when it meets the intersection of Route 70 (a four-lane road with left-turning lanes).

Major intersections
The entire route is in Ocean County.

Location	mi	km	Destinations	Notes
Point Pleasant	0.0	0.0	Route 88 (Ocean Road) / CR 630 south (Beaver Dam Road) – Bay Head, Laurelton	Southern terminus; northern terminus of CR 630
Brick Township	1.6	2.6	Route 70 – Lakehurst, Brielle	
Brick Township	3.9	6.3	CR 549 (Sally Ike Road / Herbertsville Road)	Northern terminus
1.000 mi = 1.609 km; 1.000 km = 0.621 mi
