= New Jersey Route 88 =

State highway in Ocean County, New Jersey, US

Route 88

Route information
- Maintained by NJDOT
- Length: 10.02 mi (16.13 km)
- Existed: January 1, 1953–present

Major junctions
- West end: US 9 / CR 547 in Lakewood Township
- CR 549 in Lakewood Township; Route 70 in Brick Township; CR 549 Spur in Point Pleasant
- East end: Route 35 in Point Pleasant

Location
- Country: United States
- State: New Jersey
- Counties: Ocean

Highway system
- New Jersey State Highway Routes; Interstate; US; State; Scenic Byways
← Route 87	→ Route 90

Route 88 is a state highway in the northern part of Ocean County, New Jersey, United States. It runs 10.02 mi (16.13 km) from an intersection with U.S. Route 9 (US 9)/County Route 547 (CR 547) in Lakewood Township at its western terminus to an intersection with New Jersey Route 35 in Point Pleasant at its eastern terminus. For its entire length, it is a two-lane undivided road that passes through mostly residential and commercial areas. The route intersects CR 549 in Lakewood, New Jersey Route 70 in Brick Township at the former Laurelton Circle, and CR 549 Spur/CR 630 in Point Pleasant. The road is mentioned in the lyrics of the 1973 song "Spirit in the Night" by Bruce Springsteen.

The route was built as a gravel county road in 1903 and became part of pre-1927 Route 4, a route that was to run from Absecon to Rahway, in 1916. US 9 was designated along this stretch of road in 1926 when the U.S. Highway System was created. A year later, in 1927, this portion of pre-1927 Route 4 became a part of Route 35, a route from Lakewood to South Amboy. By the 1940s, US 9 was moved off this road to follow its current alignment between Lakewood and South Amboy. In 1953, Route 35 was realigned to follow a portion of Route 37 between Point Pleasant and Seaside Heights, and Route 88 was designated along the former alignment of Route 35 between Lakewood and Point Pleasant. The Laurelton Circle at Route 70, built in 1937, was replaced with the current intersection by the 1990s.

== Route description ==
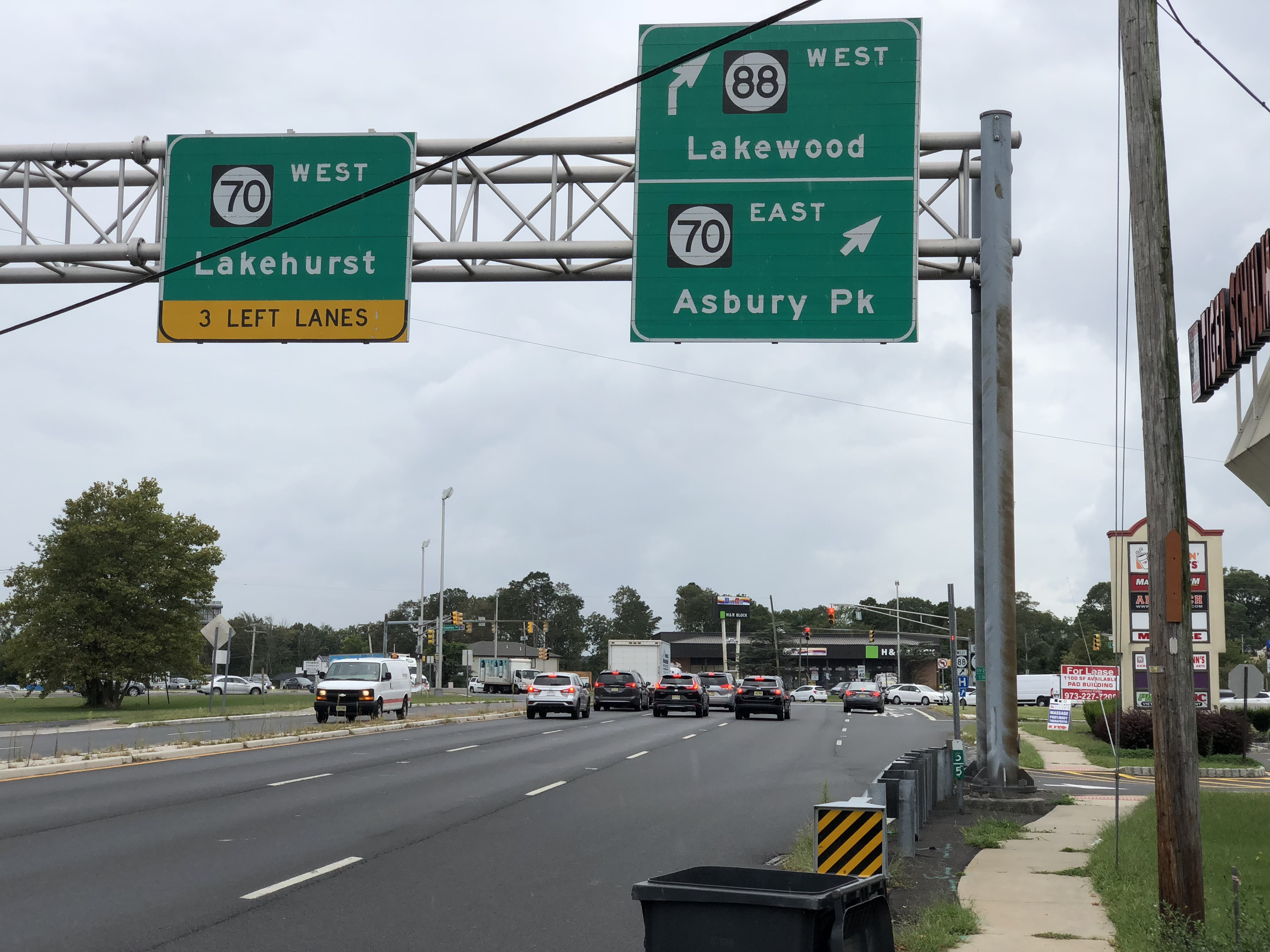
Route 88 westbound at Route 70 in Brick Township

Route 88 begins at an intersection with US 9 and CR 547 in Lakewood Township, and heads eastward on Main Street, a two-lane undivided road. The road heads through the downtown, passing south of NJ Transit's Lakewood Bus Terminal and crossing the Southern Secondary railroad line operated by the Delaware and Raritan River Railroad, before heading into wooded residential areas, where it becomes Ocean Avenue at the Pearl Street intersection before coming to a junction with CR 20 Past this intersection, the route heads through a mix of residences and businesses with some woodland. Route 88 intersects CR 623, where it heads through a commercial district, crossing CR 549. A short distance later, the route passes under the Garden State Parkway without an interchange before crossing the Metedeconk River into Brick Township. Here, the road heads through a mix of residential and commercial areas, intersecting CR 64 (Jack Martin Blvd), CR 44 (Forge Pond Road), CR 40 (West Princeton Avenue), and CR 16 (Burrsville Road). It turns south and passes west of Ocean University Medical Center, intersecting CR 40 again before reaching an intersection with Route 70 and Princeton Avenue.

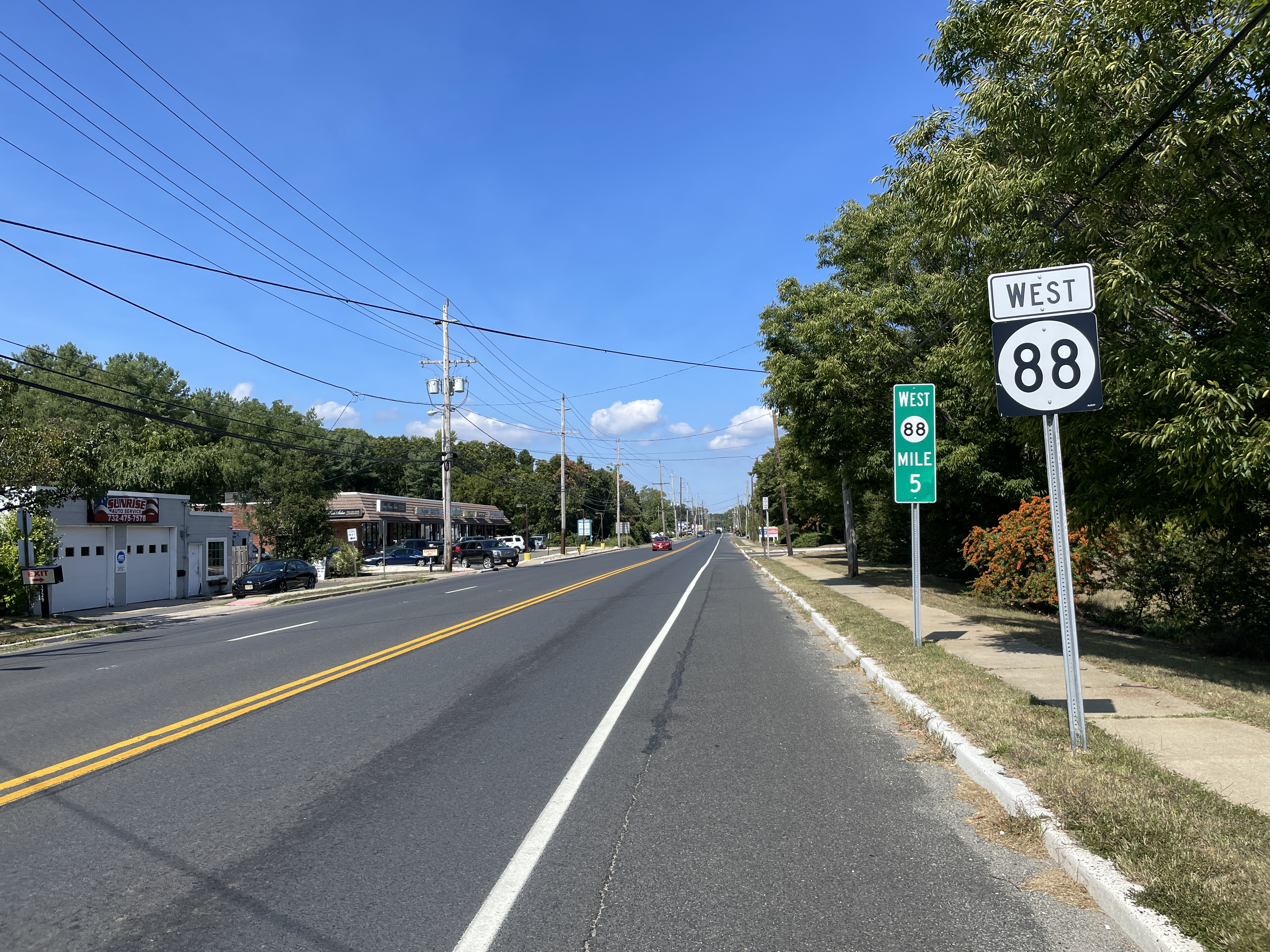
Route 88 westbound past CR 40 in Brick Township

Past this intersection, Route 88 briefly splits into a one-way pair. Here, the eastbound direction follows Princeton Avenue southeast before turning north onto Post Road, with CR 630 continuing along Princeton Avenue, while westbound Route 88 follows Princeton Post Road. Past the one-way pair, the route continues northeast on Princeton Post Road, which passes by numerous businesses. Along this stretch of road Route 88 intersects several county routes, including CR 64 again, CR 42 (Van Zile Road), CR 10 (Old Squan Road), and CR 54 (Coolidge Drive/Midstreams Road). The route then heads into Point Pleasant, where it intersects CR 56 (Jordan Avenue) before crossing the Beaver Dam Creek and becoming Sea Avenue. From here, the road crosses CR 632 (Bridge Avenue) before heading east and intersecting CR 549 Spur and CR 630 again. After this intersection, Route 88 crosses the Point Pleasant Canal (part of the Intracoastal Waterway) on the Veterans Memorial Bridge, a lift bridge, before heading east through residential areas with some businesses. Here, the road intersects CR 633/CR 10 (Arnold Ave, Johnson Ave) CR 6 (Rue Avenue), and CR 604. A short distance later, Route 88 ends at an intersection with Route 35 on the border of Point Pleasant and Point Pleasant Beach.

== History ==
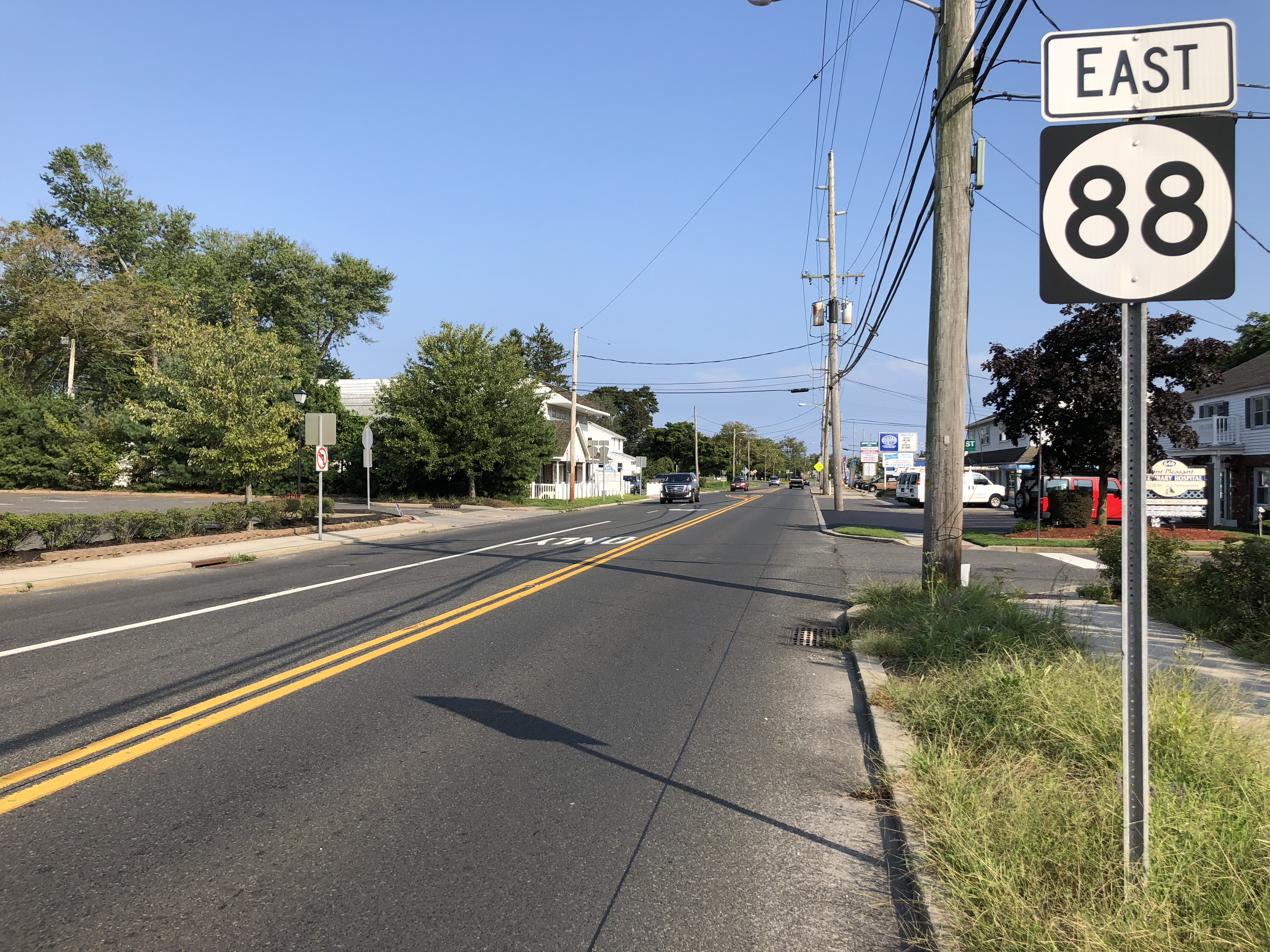
View east along Route 88 just east of Bay Avenue in Point Pleasant

What is modern-day Route 88 was first built as a hard gravel county road back in 1903, the first such road in Ocean County. This road was incorporated into the Camp Dix Way, an auto trail running from Camden to Seaside Heights. In 1916, this road was designated as a part of pre-1927 Route 4, a state road that was to run from Absecon north to Rahway. With the creation of the U.S. Highway System in 1926, US 9 was also designated along this route, running concurrent with Route 4. In the 1927 New Jersey state highway renumbering a year later, Route 35 replaced this portion of pre-1927 Route 4 as part of its route from Lakewood to South Amboy. By the 1940s, US 9 was moved off this portion of Route 35 to follow its current alignment along Route 4 between Lakewood and South Amboy. In the 1953 New Jersey state highway renumbering, Route 35 was realigned to follow what was a part of Route 37 between Point Pleasant and Seaside Heights, and Route 88 was designated along the former alignment of Route 35 between Lakewood and Point Pleasant. A traffic circle called the Laurelton Circle, built in 1937, once existed at the intersection with Route 70, was replaced with its current configuration by the 1990s. The current lift bridge that crosses the Point Pleasant Canal, the Veterans Memorial Bridge, opened in 1986 replacing an obsolete bascule lift bridge that was completed in 1928.

Route 88 was referred to in the 1973 song "Spirit in the Night" by Bruce Springsteen on his debut album Greetings from Asbury Park, N.J..

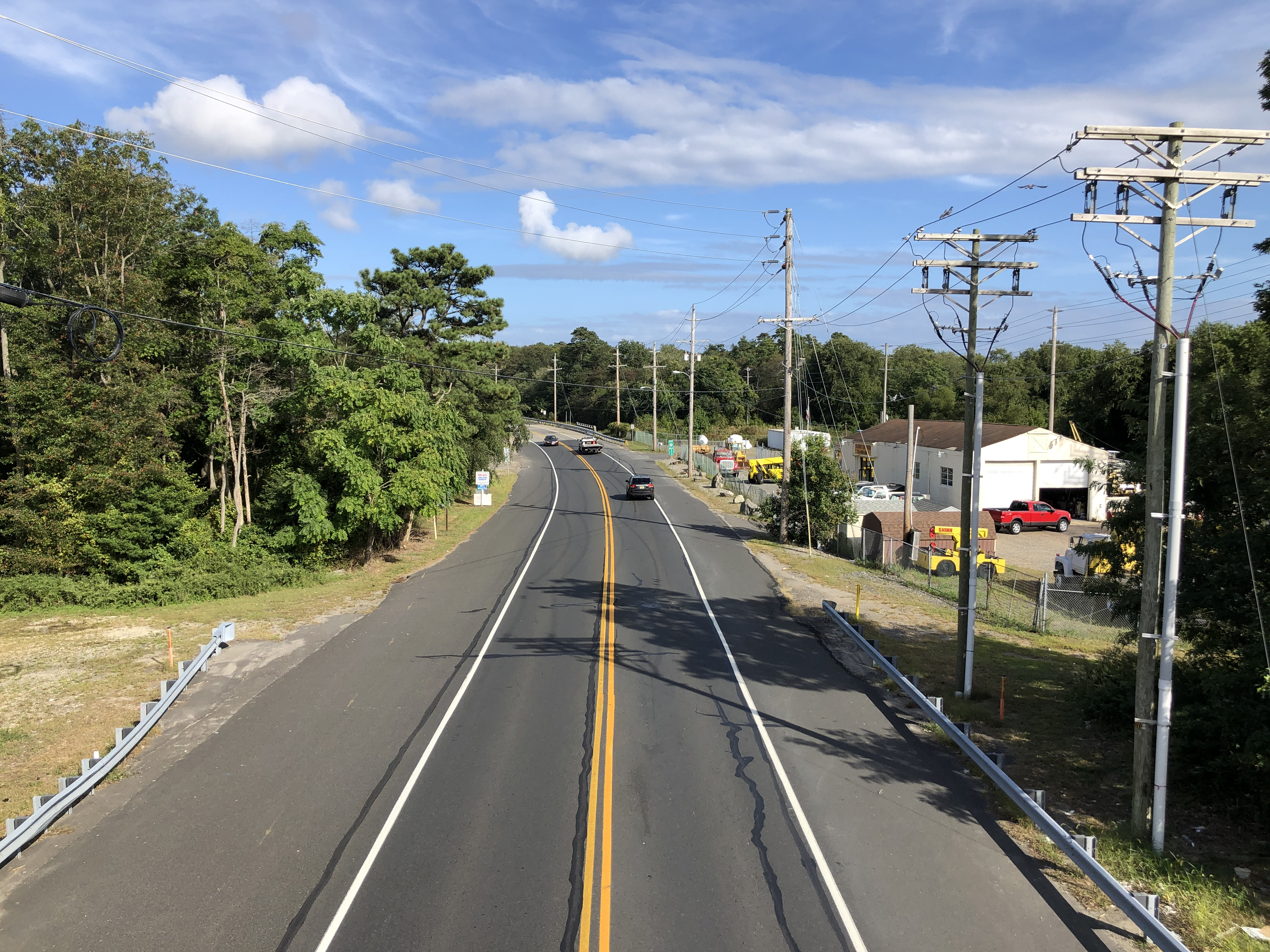
View eastbound along Route 88 from the Garden State Parkway in Lakewood

== Major intersections ==
The entire route is in Ocean County.

Location	mi	km	Destinations	Notes
Lakewood Township	0.00	0.00	US 9 / CR 547 (Madison Avenue) – Toms River, Freehold	Western terminus
Lakewood Township	3.24	5.21	CR 549 (Lanes Mill Road/Chambers Bridge Road) to G.S. Parkway	
Brick Township	5.20	8.37	Route 70 – Asbury Park, Lakehurst	Former Laurelton Circle
Point Pleasant	8.88	14.29	CR 549 Spur north (Herbertsville Road) – Herbertsville	Southern terminus of CR 549 Spur
Point Pleasant	10.02	16.13	Route 35 – Point Pleasant Beach, Seaside Park	Eastern terminus
1.000 mi = 1.609 km; 1.000 km = 0.621 mi
