= Pelican Island (New Jersey) =

Island in New Jersey

Coordinates: 39°56′35″N 74°05′18″W

Pelican Island is an island in the Barnegat Bay wholly located in Ocean County, New Jersey. It is accessible from Toms River and Seaside Heights via the Tunney and Mathis Bridges on New Jersey Route 37. It is part of Toms River and Berkeley Township.

Pelican Island was impacted significantly by damage from Hurricane Sandy.
