= New Jersey Route 37 =

State highway in Ocean County, New Jersey, US

Route 37

Route information
- Maintained by NJDOT
- Length: 13.4 mi (21.6 km)
- Existed: 1927–present

Major junctions
- West end: Route 70 in Lakehurst
- CR 527 in Toms River; US 9 / G.S. Parkway in Toms River; Route 166 in Toms River
- East end: Route 35 in Seaside Heights

Location
- Country: United States
- State: New Jersey
- Counties: Ocean

Highway system
- New Jersey State Highway Routes; Interstate; US; State; Scenic Byways
← Route 36	→ Route 38

Route 37 is a state highway located in Ocean County, New Jersey, United States. The route runs 13.4 mi (21.57 km) from a traffic circle with Route 70 in Lakehurst east to an interchange with Route 35 in Seaside Heights. A two– to six–lane divided highway its entire length, Route 37 serves as the major east–west route through the Toms River area as well as a main route to the Barnegat Peninsula, crossing the Barnegat Bay on the Thomas A. Mathis and J. Stanley Tunney Bridges, for eastbound and westbound traffic, respectively. The route through Toms River is lined with many businesses and named Little League World Champions Boulevard in honor of Toms River East Little League's victory in the 1998 Little League World Series. Route 37 intersects many major roads in the Toms River area, including CR 527, the Garden State Parkway/US 9, Route 166, CR 549, and CR 571/549 Spur. The route usually experiences congestion from both development in the area and from traffic bound for the barrier islands in the summer.

Route 37 was first legislated in 1927 in two sections: one running from Trenton to White Horse along the current US 206 alignment that replaced part of Pre-1927 Route 2 and the other running from Lakehurst to Point Pleasant that replaced part of Pre-1927 Route 18 between Lakehurst and Toms River. In 1953, Route 37 was legislated along its current alignment, with the designation dropped on the Trenton–White Horse segment to avoid the concurrency with US 206 and the Seaside Heights–Point Pleasant section becoming a realignment of Route 35. Route 37 was then proposed in the 1960s as a freeway running from White Horse to Seaside Heights. This freeway proposal was eventually altered to create I-195, running from Trenton to Wall Township.

== Route description ==
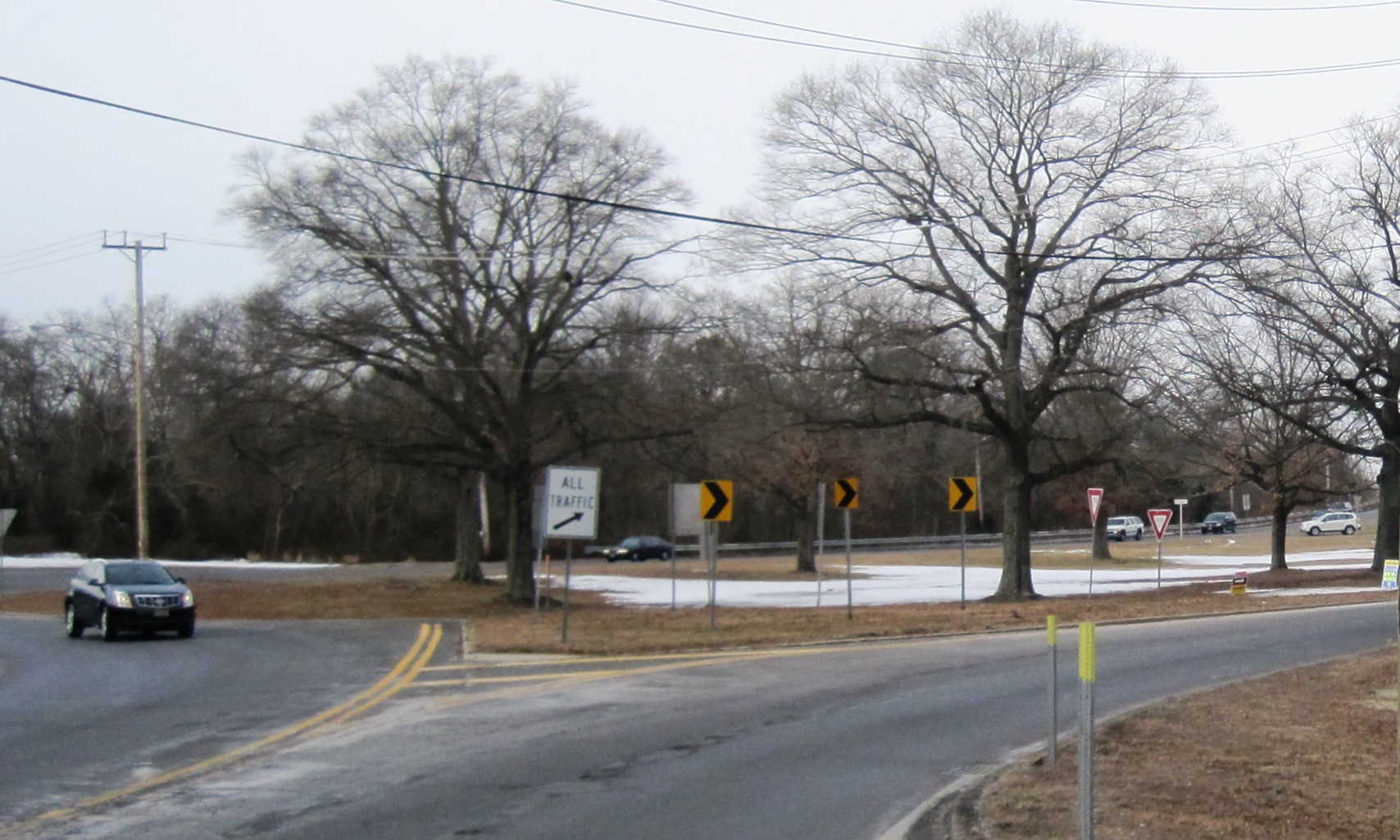
Route 37 at its western terminus at Route 70 at the Lakehurst Circle

Route 37 begins at the Lakehurst Circle with Route 70 in Lakehurst, heading east first briefly as an undivided two-lane road, then becoming a four–lane divided highway. Soon after beginning, the route crosses into Manchester. It intersects with Commonwealth Boulevard, which provides access to the Leisure Village West-Pine Lake Park community, before crossing into Toms River. Route 37 continues east with many intersections that feature jughandles and at the intersection with Industrial Way, the road widens to six lanes. Route 37 passes to the north of Holiday City - Silver Ridge Park, an age-restricted community which contributes to the large population of senior residents in the area. The route crosses Conrail Shared Assets Operations' Toms River Industrial Track line before it meets the intersection of Mule Road (CR 642) and Oak Ridge Parkway/Lakehurst Road (CR 527). After the intersection of Oak Ridge Parkway/Lakehurst Road (CR 527), the route passes north of Community Medical Center and crosses over the North Branch of the Toms River.

Route 37 eastbound past Route 166 in Toms River

Route 37 features a cloverleaf interchange with the Garden State Parkway/US 9. Past the Garden State Parkway, the route crosses the former alignment of US 9, Route 166. Past this intersection, Route 37 becomes a road lined with several businesses. The route intersects with Hooper Avenue (CR 549) and Clifton Avenue (CR 38). Vaughn Avenue/West End Avenue (CR 627) intersects next and Route 37 runs along the border between Toms River to the north and Island Heights to the south. Route 37 meets the intersection of Central Avenue (CR 627) and fully enters Toms River again at the intersection of Gilford Avenue. Further east, the route intersects with Fischer Boulevard (CR 549 Spur/CR 571).

After the intersection, Route 37 crosses the Barnegat Bay on the Thomas A. Mathis and J. Stanley Tunney Bridges with the eastbound bridge featuring a drawbridge that allows ships to pass through while the westbound bridge is a higher-level span. The route continues onto Pelican Island in the Barnegat Bay, crossing into a small area of Berkeley Township. Route 37 crosses over a part of the Barnegat Bay and heads onto the Barnegat Peninsula, where the route comes to its eastern terminus at an interchange with Route 35 on the border of Berkeley Township and Seaside Heights. At this interchange, access to Seaside Heights is provided by a ramp from northbound Route 35 a short distance past the ramp from eastbound Route 37, connecting to Sumner Avenue, while access from Seaside Heights to westbound Route 37 is provided by a direct ramp from Hamilton Avenue.

Due to the area's vacationers, many of which come from New York and Northern New Jersey, Route 37 is routinely congested with seasonal traffic in the summer, especially on and around the Mathis and Tunney Bridges and at the interchange with the Garden State Parkway as heavy tourist traffic converges on the shore. Additionally, the road sees congestion due to the area's rapid growth in commercial development.

== History ==
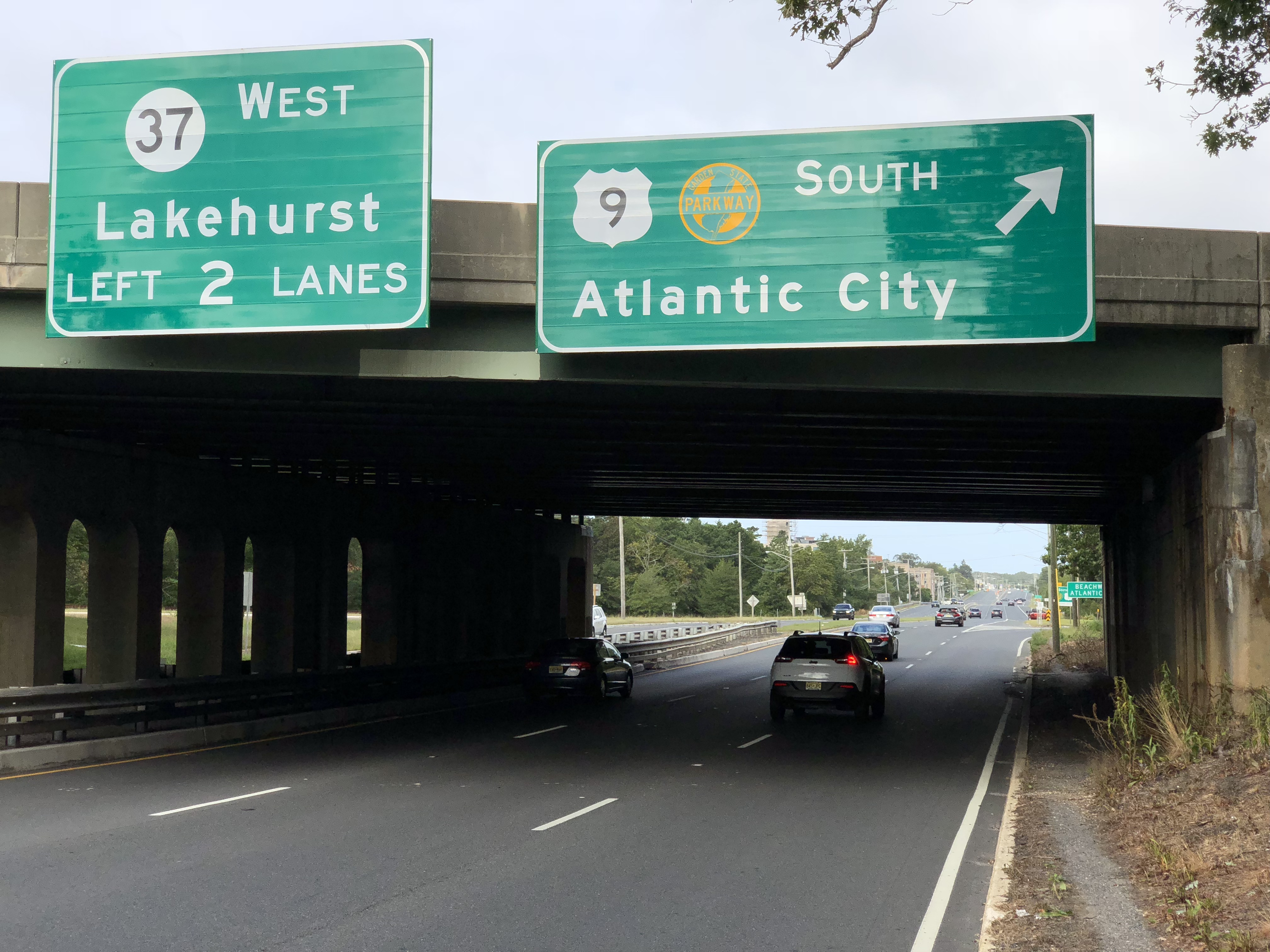
View west along Route 37 at the Garden State Parkway and US 9 in Toms River Township

The road from Toms River to Seaside Heights was part of the Jersey Coast Way, which stretched from Cape May to the Staten Island Ferry. Prior to 1927, the route between present-day Route 70 in Lakehurst and present-day CR 527 in Toms River was a part of Pre-1927 Route 18, which was legislated in 1923 to run from Camden to Toms River. In the 1927 New Jersey state highway renumbering, Route 37 was legislated to run from Route 27 and Route 30 (now Business US 1, US 206, and Route 31) in Trenton to Route 35 (now Route 88) in Point Pleasant, passing through White Horse, Allentown, Lakehurst, Toms River, and Seaside Heights. The portion between Trenton and White Horse replaced part of Pre-1927 Route 2, while the portion between Lakehurst and Toms River replaced part of Pre-1927 Route 18.

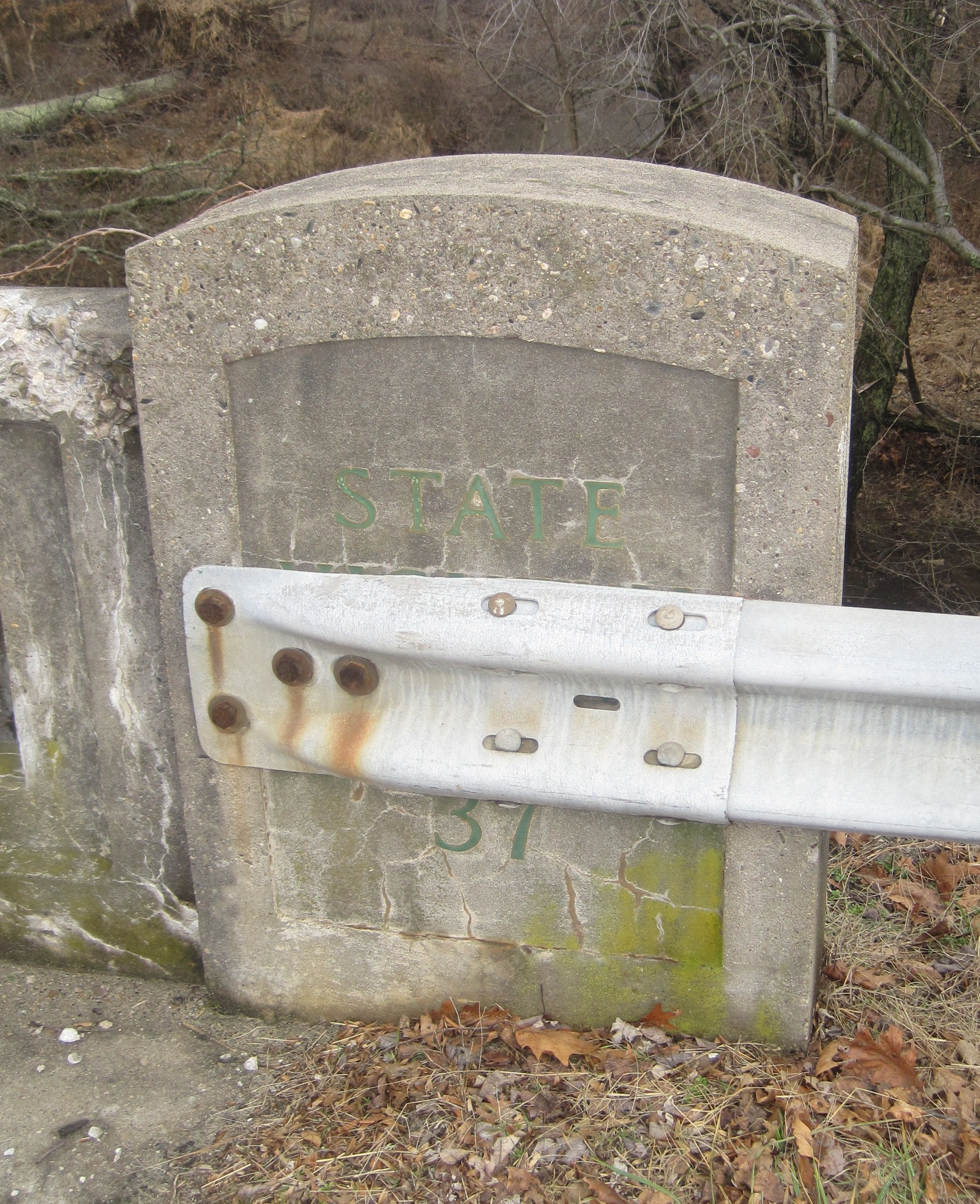
Bridge stamp for former alignment of Route 37 along CR 539 in Monmouth County

Following the 1927 renumbering, Route 37 existed in multiple separate sections: one running from the Trenton–Hamilton line to the White Horse Circle (concurrently with US 206), the crossing of Gropp Lake in Hamilton (currently a state-maintained section of CR 524), a 1/2-mile (0.80 km) segment between Hamilton and Upper Freehold west of Allentown (also current CR 524), a section of current CR 539 between Burlington Path Road in Upper Freehold and Hornerstown Road in Plumsted Township, and one running from Route 40 (now Route 70) in Lakehurst to Point Pleasant. The remainder of the route between White Horse and Lakehurst remained incomplete. In the 1953 New Jersey state highway renumbering, Route 37 was legislated to run along its current alignment from Route 70 in Lakehurst to Route 35 in Seaside Heights. The number was dropped between Trenton and White Horse in favor of US 206, while the section between Seaside Heights and Point Pleasant became a realignment of Route 35.

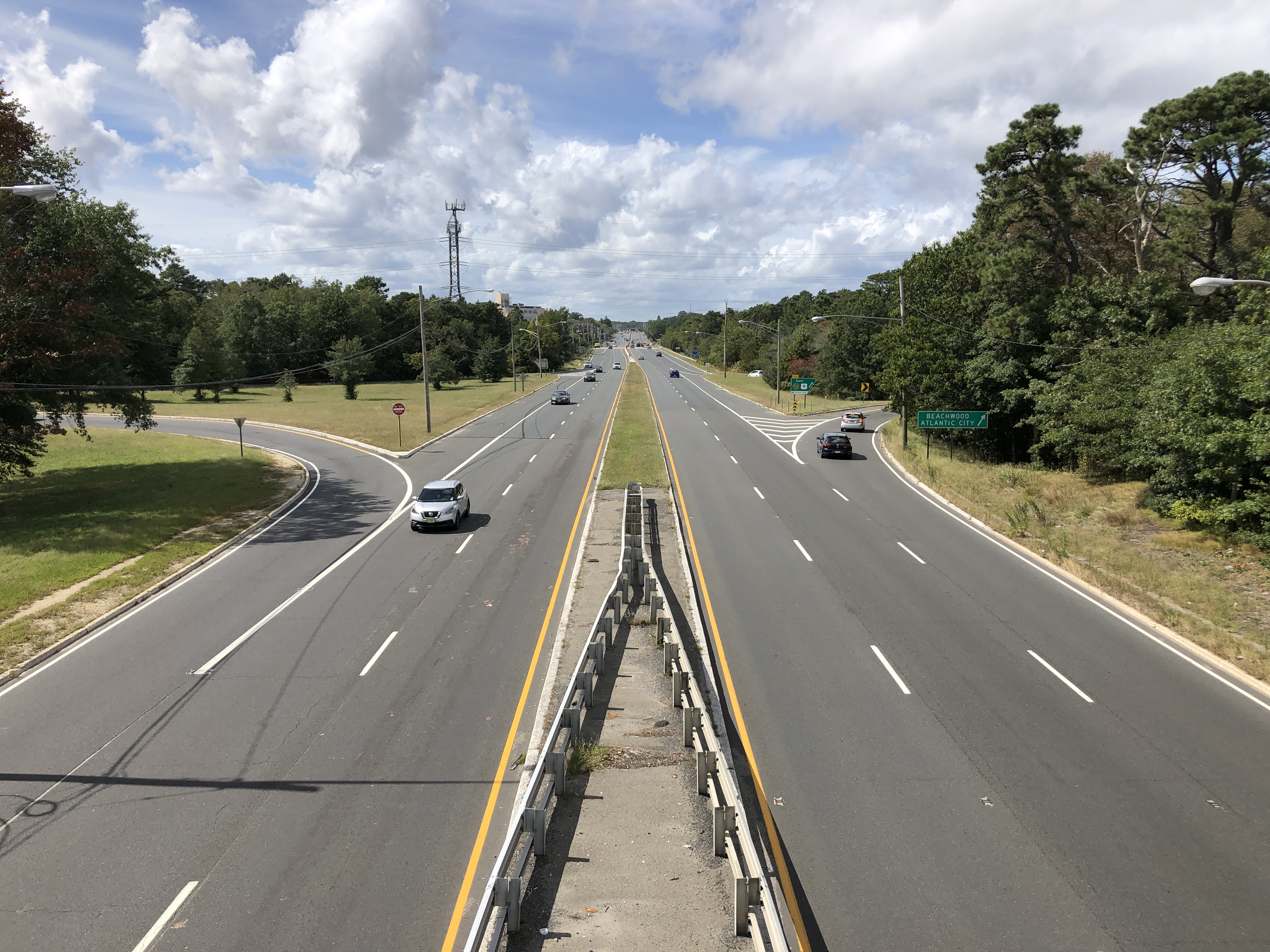
View westbound along Route 37 from the Garden State Parkway and US 9 in Toms River

Route 37 was proposed in the late 1960s as a freeway that was to run from Route 29 in the Trenton area to Seaside Heights. It was suggested that this freeway be completed by 1975 in order to handle a rapid growth of population in Central New Jersey. In 1967, this proposal was altered to build a road that compromised with the proposed Route 38 freeway between Camden and Wall Township. It soon received federal funding and was built as I-195, running from Trenton to Wall Township.

The portion of Route 37 within Toms River was officially named Little League World Champions Boulevard in 1998 following Toms River East Little League's victory in the 1998 Little League World Series.

== Major intersections ==
The entire route is in Ocean County.

Location	mi	km	Destinations	Notes
Lakehurst	0.0	0.0	Route 70 – Camden, Lakewood, Pt Pleasant, Asbury Pk	Lakehurst Circle; western terminus
Toms River	5.1	8.2	CR 527 (Oak Ridge Pkwy/Lakehurst Rd)	
Toms River	6.3	10.1	US 9 / G.S. Parkway – Atlantic City, Lakewood, Woodbridge, New York	Cloverleaf interchange; Exits 82A-B (Garden State Parkway)
Toms River	6.6	10.6	Route 166 (Main St) – Lakewood, Beachwood	
Toms River	7.3	11.7	CR 549 (Hooper Ave) – Brick Twp, Toms River	
Toms River	10.8	17.4	CR 549 Spur north / CR 571 west (Fischer Blvd) – Brick Twp	Southern terminus of CR 549 Spur (southern segment) and CR 571
Barnegat Bay	11.9	19.2	Thomas A. Mathis and J. Stanley Tunney Bridges	
Berkeley Township–Seaside Heights line	13.4	21.6	Route 35 – Seaside Hts, Pt Pleasant, Seaside Park, Island Beach	Interchange; eastern terminus; access from Seaside Heights via the ramp from Hamilton Avenue
1.000 mi = 1.609 km; 1.000 km = 0.621 mi
