= County Route 526 (New Jersey) =

County highway in New Jersey, U.S.

County Route 526
- CR 526 highlighted in red, CR 526 Spur in blue, signed but unofficial alignments in pink

Route information
- Maintained by Mercer County, West Windsor Township, NJDOT, Monmouth County, Ocean County
- Length: 35.56 mi (57.23 km)
- Tourist routes: Upper Freehold Historic Farmland Byway

Major junctions
- West end: CR 571 in West Windsor Township
- US 130 / Route 33 in Robbinsville Township; I-195 in Robbinsville Township; US 9 in Lakewood Township
- East end: CR 549 in Lakewood Township

Location
- Country: United States
- State: New Jersey
- Counties: Mercer, Monmouth, Ocean

Highway system
- County routes in New Jersey; 500-series routes
← CR 525	→ CR 527

County Route 526 (CR 526) is a county highway in the U.S. state of New Jersey. The highway extends 35.56 miles (57.23 km) from Princeton–Hightstown Road (CR 571) in West Windsor Township to Lanes Mill Road (CR 549) in Lakewood Township.

Despite the official ending at CR 571 in West Windsor, most signs show it concurrent with CR 571 to its end at Route 27 in Princeton.

== Route description ==
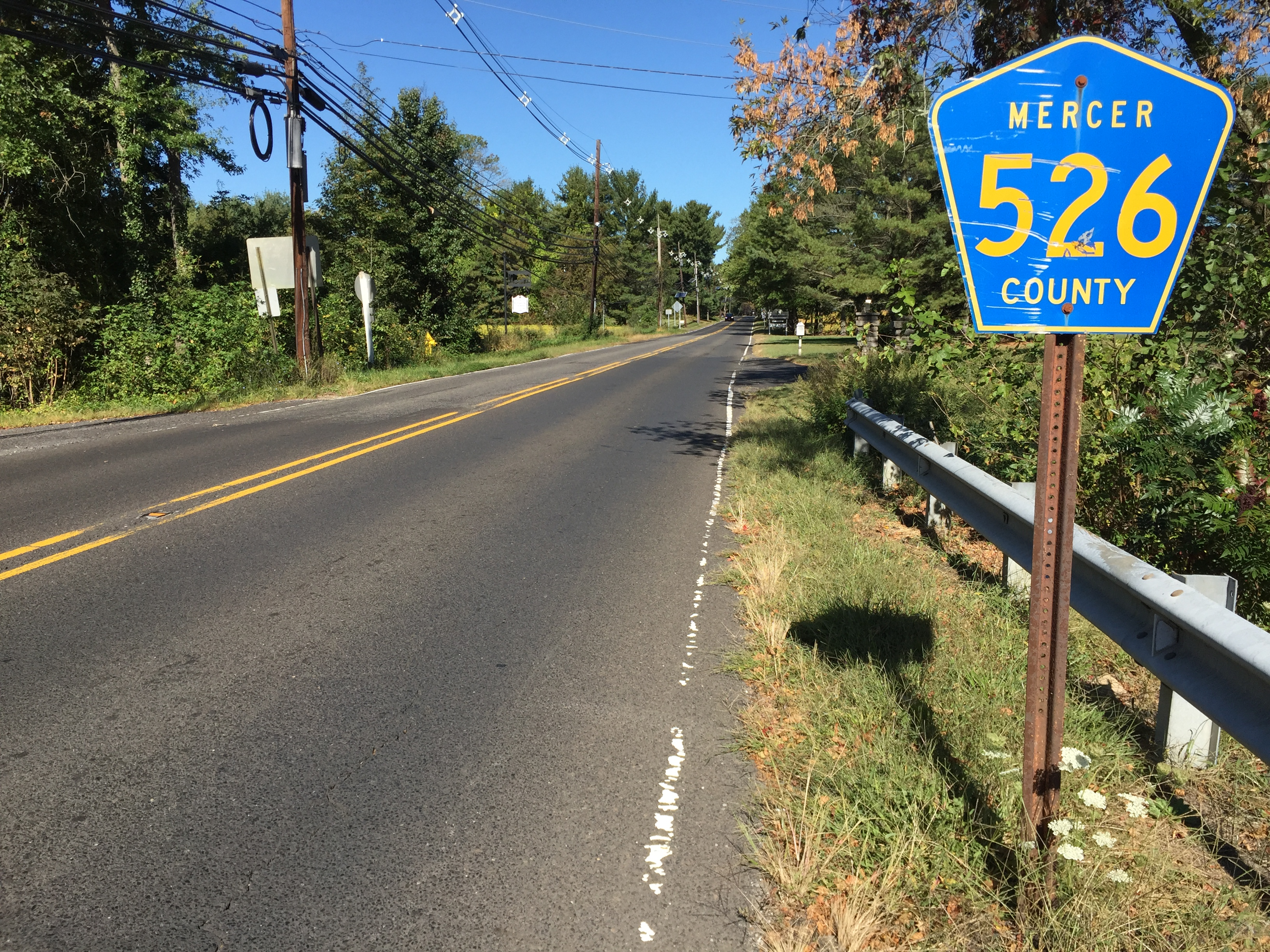
CR 526 westbound entering Robbinsville

CR 526 officially begins at an intersection with CR 571 in West Windsor Township, Mercer County, heading south on two-lane undivided South Mill Road. Although the official western terminus is here, signage for CR 526 continues northwest along CR 571 to Route 27 in Princeton. From CR 571, the route passes through residential subdivisions. At Woodmere Way, the road's jurisdiction changes from county to municipal where it curves east and then south on New Edinburg Road with a median. The road crosses CR 644 where county maintenance resumes and continues south, with the center line narrowing past the New Village Road intersection. CR 526 intersects CR 535 and CR 641, turning west for a brief concurrency with CR 535 on Old Trenton Road before heading south on Robbinsville Road. The route into agricultural areas and enters Robbinsville Township, eventually heading into a mix of farms, woods, and homes. Farther south, the road passes through housing subdivisions before turning southeast for a brief concurrency with Route 33 prior to following Robbinsville–Allentown Road. Here, CR 526 passes businesses and crosses an abandoned railroad line before coming to U.S. Route 130 (US 130). The route officially turns northeast for a brief concurrency with US 130 on a four-lane divided highway before resuming east on two-lane undivided Robbinsville Bypass. The former alignment of Robbinsville–Allentown Road between US 130 and the Robbinsville Bypass is also officially signed as CR 526 and maintained by Mercer County. The road curves south and then southeast as it heads into residential areas. CR 526 passes over the New Jersey Turnpike (Interstate 95 or I-95) before turning south near warehouses and coming to an interchange with I-195. South of this interchange, the route heads through a mix of farmland and woodland, curving southeast.

CR 526 continues into Allentown in Monmouth County and passes homes before it forms a short concurrency with CR 524 and CR 539 on Main Street. From this point, the route continues east through residential areas on Waker Avenue, leaving Allentown for Upper Freehold Township. First, the road intersects CR 526 Alternate (CR 526 Alt.) which provides a bypass of Allentown for traffic to and from I-195. In this area, the road passes farms to the north and homes to the south as it intersects CR 526 Spur. CR 526 heads straight through a mix of farmland and woodland with a few areas of development, passing through open areas of farms prior to crossing Sharon Station Road (CR 539 Alt.), the Union Transportation Trail (formerly Pemberton and Hightstown Railroad), and CR 43, which loops to the south of CR 526 and intersects it again a short distance later. The route passes agricultural areas to the north and woodland to the south before running through a mix of farms, woods, and residences. The road passes Red Valley Lake and heads into Millstone Township, becoming Trenton–Lakewood Road and turning to the northeast. CR 526 passes over I-195 and curves east into more wooded areas before intersecting CR 571 again in developed areas. At this point, CR 526 turns south to run concurrent with CR 571, passing through forested areas with a few homes.

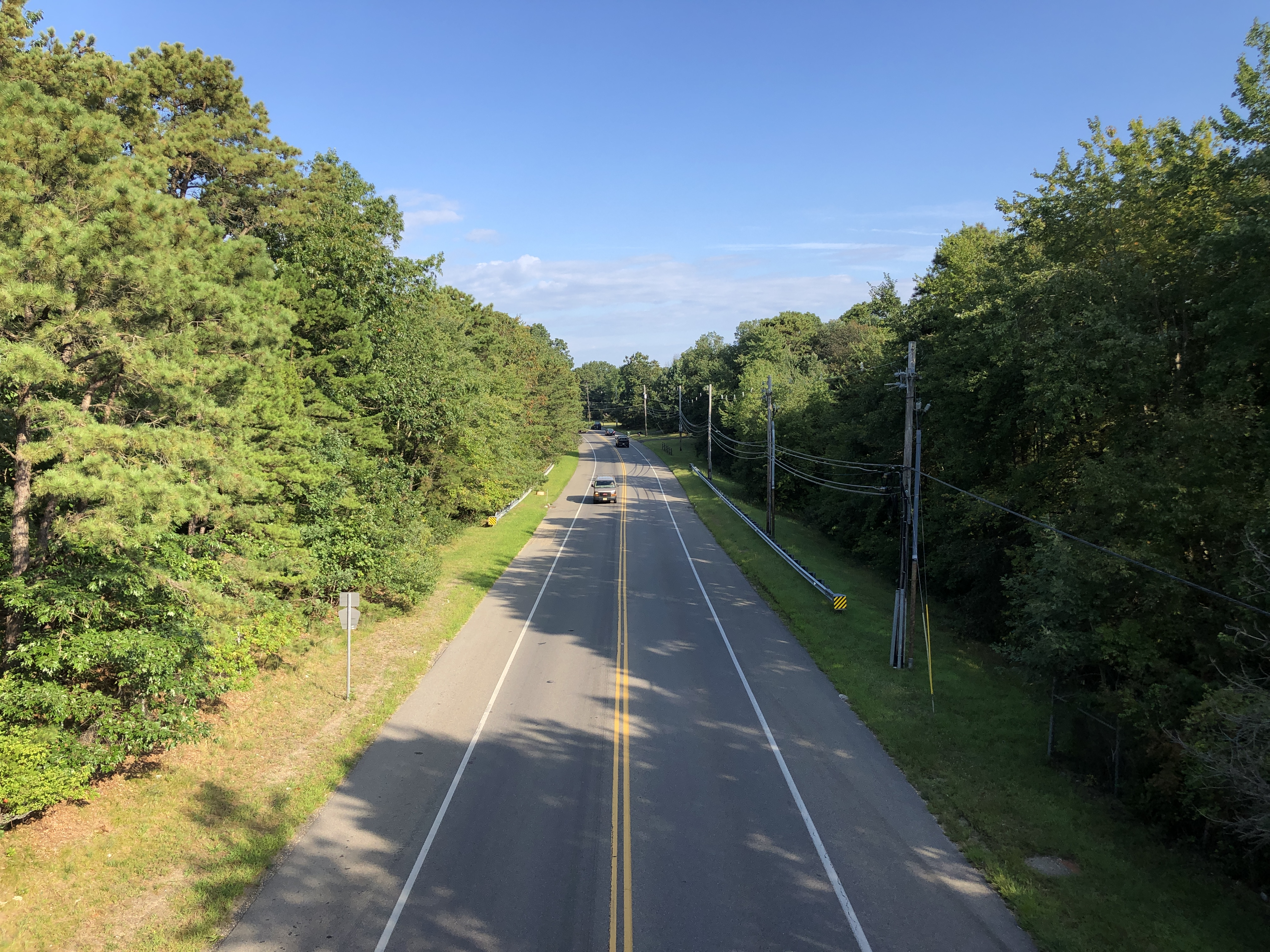
View westbound along CR 526 and northbound along CR 571 from I-195 in northwestern Jackson Township

Upon crossing CR 537, the road enters Jackson Township in Ocean County and continues through more forests, passing under I-195 before CR 526 splits from CR 571 by turning east onto West Commodore Boulevard. The road passes through more wooded are as of development, with the forests becoming more dense as the route comes to CR 527. At this intersection, CR 526 becomes East Commodore Boulevard and passes near more forested areas of homes before briefly joining CR 638 and becoming Jackson Mills Road. The road passes through wooded areas with some farms and development, with the road name changing to County Line Road. CR 526 heads southeast into increasing residential and commercial development as it widens into a four-lane divided highway with jughandles as it approaches the CR 636 junction. The route passes several businesses before becoming the border between Jackson Township to the northeast and Lakewood Township to the southwest as it intersects CR 641 and becomes a four-lane undivided road. The road heads into more residential surroundings as it fully enters Lakewood Township, intersecting CR 639 before curving to the east and coming to the US 9 junction. Past this intersection, CR 526 narrows to two lanes and passes more homes as it heads to the CR 547 junction. The route crosses the Southern Secondary railroad line operated by the Delaware and Raritan River Railroad and passes more areas of homes and businesses before entering more wooded areas of development and turning southeast to meet CR 623. At this point, the name of the road changes to Lanes Mill Road and it passes more residential areas before CR 526 comes to its eastern terminus at CR 549.

== History ==
In the 19th century, what is now CR 526 west of Imlaystown was part of two turnpikes; the Trenton and Allentown Turnpike, and the Allentown and Imlayston Turnpike, chartered in 1858 to connect the two points.

== Major intersections ==
County	Location	mi	km	Destinations	Notes
Mercer	West Windsor Township	0.00	0.00	CR 571 (Princeton–Hightstown Road) – Princeton	Western terminus
Mercer	West Windsor Township	3.42	5.50	CR 535 north (Old Trenton Road)	Western end of CR 535 concurrency
Mercer	West Windsor Township	3.84	6.18	CR 535 south (Old Trenton Road)	Eastern end of CR 535 concurrency
Mercer	Robbinsville Township	6.58	10.59	Route 33 west – Trenton	Western end of Route 33 concurrency
Mercer	Robbinsville Township	6.61	10.64	Route 33 east – Hightstown, Asbury Park	Eastern end of Route 33 concurrency
Mercer	Robbinsville Township	6.88	11.07	US 130 south to I-95 / N.J. Turnpike – Bordentown	Western end of US 130 concurrency
Mercer	Robbinsville Township	7.02	11.30	US 130 north / Route 33 – Hightstown	Eastern end of US 130 concurrency
Mercer	Robbinsville Township	9.35	15.05	I-195 to I-95 / N.J. Turnpike – Trenton, Shore Points	Exit 7 on I-195; no westbound access to I-195 east
Monmouth	Allentown	10.50	16.90	CR 524 west / CR 539 south (Main Street)	Western end of CR 524/CR 539 concurrency
Monmouth	Allentown	10.52	16.93	CR 524 east / CR 539 north to I-195	Eastern end of CR 524/CR 539 concurrency
Monmouth	Upper Freehold Township	10.98	17.67	CR 526 Spur north (Allentown Bypass) to I-95 / N.J. Turnpike / I-195 / CR 539 north – Hightstown, Trenton	Southern terminus of CR 526 Spur
Monmouth	Upper Freehold Township	12.82	20.63	CR 539 Alt. south (Sharon Station Road)	Northern terminus of CR 539 Alt.
Monmouth	Millstone Township	19.49	31.37	CR 571 north (Millstone Road)	Western end of CR 571 concurrency
Monmouth–Ocean county line	Millstone–Jackson township line	20.07	32.30	CR 537 – Freehold, Mount Holly	
Ocean	Jackson Township	20.96	33.73	CR 571 south (Cassville Road) – Cassville	Eastern end of CR 571 concurrency
Ocean	Jackson Township	24.33	39.16	CR 527 (Cedar Swamp Road) to I-195 – Allentown, Trenton	
Ocean	Lakewood Township	31.73	51.06	US 9 (Madison Avenue) – Perth Amboy, Toms River	
Ocean	Lakewood Township	32.49	52.29	CR 547 (Squankum Road)	
Ocean	Lakewood Township	35.56	57.23	CR 549 to G.S. Parkway	Eastern terminus
1.000 mi = 1.609 km; 1.000 km = 0.621 mi: Concurrency terminus; Incomplete access

== CR 526 Spur ==
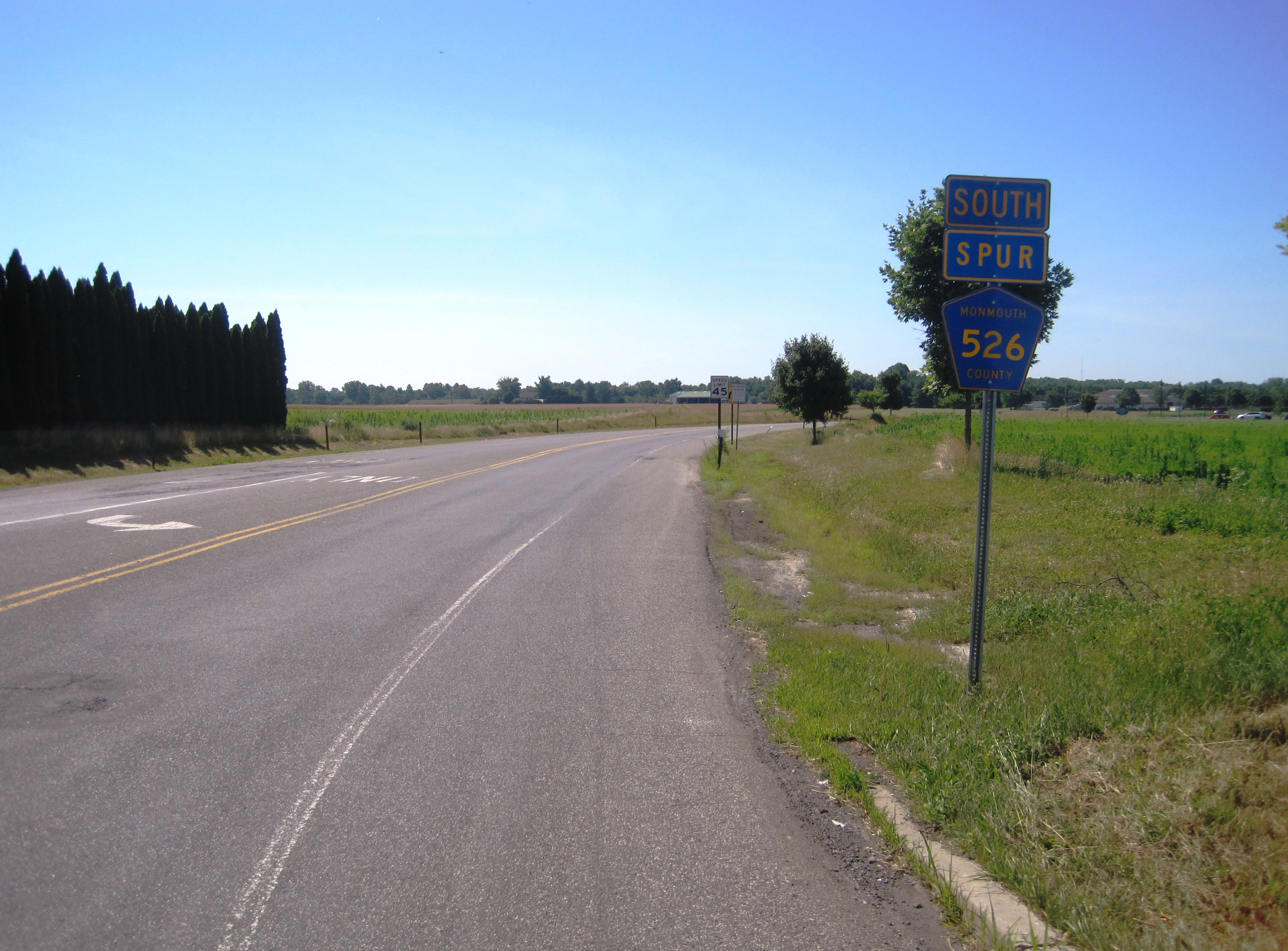
Signage for CR 526 Spur as seen in June 2018

County Route 526 Spur
- Location: Upper Freehold Township
- Length: 0.44 mi (710 m)
- Existed: 2003–present

County Route 526 Spur (CR 526 Spur) is a county highway in the U.S. state of New Jersey. Completed in 2003 and entirely within Upper Freehold Township, it is known as the Allentown Bypass, as it allows through traffic to bypass the Borough of Allentown. The highway extends 0.44-mile (0.71 km) from Allentown - Red Valley Road (CR 526) to Old York Road (CR 524 and CR 539). It is two lanes wide; a farm mostly lines the west side of the road while the east side has the Reed Recreation Area; the only place accessible from the road itself. The road was briefly signed as CR 526 Alternate in early 2018, which agrees with NJDOT documents, though Monmouth County documents indicate it is CR 526 Spur.
