= List of highways numbered 65 =

The following highways are numbered 65:

== International ==
- AH65 Asian Highway 65
- E65 European route E65

== Canada ==
- Highway 65 (Ontario)

== China ==
- G65 Expressway

== France ==
- Autoroute A65

== Germany ==
- Bundesautobahn 65
- Bundesstraße 65

== Greece ==
- A65 motorway (Egaleo Ring)
- EO65 road

== India ==
- NH 65
- Bihar State Highway 65
- Gujarat State Highway 65
- Kerala State Highway 65
- Maharashtra State Highway 65
- Rajasthan State Highway 65
- Tamil Nadu State Highway 65
- Uttar Pradesh State Highway 65

== Iran ==
- Road 65 (Iran)

== Israel ==
- Highway 65 (Israel)

== Japan ==
- Shin-Kūkō Expressway

== Jordan ==
- Highway 65

== Korea, South ==
- Donghae Expressway
- National Route 65
- Incheon City Route 65

== Netherlands ==
- A65 motorway (Netherlands)

== New Zealand ==
- New Zealand State Highway 65

== Pakistan ==
- N-65 National Highway

== Philippines ==
- N65 highway (Philippines)

== Saudi Arabia ==
- Highway 65 (Saudi Arabia)

== Spain ==
- Autovía A-65
- C-65 Autovia C-65

== Taiwan ==
- Provincial Highway 65 (Taiwan)

== United Kingdom ==
- British A65
- British M65

== United States ==
- Interstate 65
- U.S. Route 65
- Alabama State Route 65
- County Route 65 (Lee County, Alabama)
- Arizona State Route 65 (former)
- California State Route 65
- Colorado State Highway 65
- Florida State Road 65
  - County Road 65 (Franklin County, Florida)
  - County Road 65 (Gadsden County, Florida)
    - County Road 65A (Gadsden County, Florida)
    - County Road 65B (Gadsden County, Florida)
    - County Road 65C (Gadsden County, Florida)
    - County Road 65D (Gadsden County, Florida)
  - County Road 65 (Holmes County, Florida)
- Georgia State Route 65
  - Georgia State Route 65 (1921–1926) (former)
- Hawaii Route 65
- Illinois Route 65
- Indiana State Road 65
- K-65 (Kansas highway)
- Maryland Route 65
  - Maryland Route 65A
- M-65 (Michigan highway)
- Minnesota State Highway 65
  - County Road 65 (Ramsey County, Minnesota)
- Missouri Route 65 (1922) (former)
- Nebraska Highway 65
  - Nebraska Spur 65A
- Nevada State Route 65 (former)
- New Jersey Route 65 (former)
  - County Route 65 (Bergen County, New Jersey)
- New Mexico State Road 65
- New York State Route 65
  - County Route 65 (Cattaraugus County, New York)
  - County Route 65 (Chautauqua County, New York)
  - County Route 65 (Dutchess County, New York)
  - County Route 65 (Erie County, New York)
  - County Route 65 (Greene County, New York)
  - County Route 65 (Herkimer County, New York)
  - County Route 65 (Jefferson County, New York)
  - County Route 65 (Livingston County, New York)
  - County Route 65 (Oneida County, New York)
  - County Route 65 (Orange County, New York)
  - County Route 65 (Putnam County, New York)
  - County Route 65 (Rensselaer County, New York)
  - County Route 65 (Rockland County, New York)
  - County Route 65 (Saratoga County, New York)
  - County Route 65 (Schoharie County, New York)
  - County Route 65 (Suffolk County, New York)
  - County Route 65 (Sullivan County, New York)
  - County Route 65 (Ulster County, New York)
- North Carolina Highway 65
- North Dakota Highway 65
- Ohio State Route 65
- Oklahoma State Highway 65
- Pennsylvania Route 65
- South Carolina Highway 65
- South Dakota Highway 65
- Tennessee State Route 65
- Texas State Highway 65
  - Texas State Highway Spur 65
  - Farm to Market Road 65
  - Texas Park Road 65
- Utah State Route 65
- Vermont Route 65
- Virginia State Route 65
- West Virginia Route 65
- Wisconsin Highway 65
- Wyoming Highway 65 (former)

Territories

- Puerto Rico Highway 65
- U.S. Virgin Islands Highway 65

== See also ==
- A65 (disambiguation)

Preceded by 64	Lists of highways 65	Succeeded by 66
