= List of highways numbered 64 =

The following highways are numbered 64:

== Australia ==
- Mid-Western Highway

== Canada ==
- Alberta Highway 64
- Highway 64 (Ontario)

== Greece ==
- A64 motorway (formerly numbered the A62)
- EO64 road

== India ==
- National Highway 64

== Iran ==
- Road 64

== Korea, South ==
- National Route 64

== Philippines ==
- N64 highway (Philippines)

== Taiwan ==
- Provincial Highway 64 (Taiwan)

== United Kingdom ==
- A64 road running from Leeds to Scarborough

== United States ==
- Interstate 64
- U.S. Route 64
- Alabama State Route 64
  - County Route 64 (Lee County, Alabama)
- Arizona State Route 64
- California State Route 64 (unbuilt)
- Colorado State Highway 64
- Connecticut Route 64
- Florida State Road 64
  - County Road 64A (Hardee County, Florida)
  - County Road 64 (Highlands County, Florida)
  - County Road 64 (Polk County, Florida)
- Georgia State Route 64
- Hawaii Route 64
- Idaho State Highway 64
- Illinois Route 64
- Indiana State Road 64
- Iowa Highway 64
- K-64 (Kansas highway)
- Louisiana Highway 64
  - Louisiana State Route 64 (former)
- Maryland Route 64
- Massachusetts Route 64 (former)
- M-64 (Michigan highway)
- Minnesota State Highway 64
  - County Road 64 (Scott County, Minnesota)
- Missouri Route 64
  - Missouri Route 64A
  - Missouri Route 64B
- Montana Highway 64
- Nebraska Highway 64
  - Nebraska Spur 64A
  - Nebraska Spur 64B
  - Nebraska Spur 64E
  - Nebraska Spur 64G
  - Nebraska Recreation Road 64F
  - Nebraska Recreation Road 64H
- Nevada State Route 64 (former)
- New Jersey Route 64
  - County Route 64 (Bergen County, New Jersey)
- New York State Route 64
  - County Route 64 (Cattaraugus County, New York)
  - County Route 64 (Chemung County, New York)
  - County Route 64 (Dutchess County, New York)
  - County Route 64 (Erie County, New York)
  - County Route 64 (Jefferson County, New York)
  - County Route 64 (Madison County, New York)
  - County Route 64 (Montgomery County, New York)
  - County Route 64 (Onondaga County, New York)
  - County Route 64 (Putnam County, New York)
  - County Route 64 (Rockland County, New York)
  - County Route 64 (Saratoga County, New York)
  - County Route 64 (Suffolk County, New York)
  - County Route 64 (Warren County, New York)
- North Carolina Highway 64 (former)
- Ohio State Route 64
- Oklahoma State Highway 64A (former)
  - Oklahoma State Highway 64B
  - Oklahoma State Highway 64C (former)
  - Oklahoma State Highway 64D
- Pennsylvania Route 64
- South Carolina Highway 64
- Tennessee State Route 64
- Texas State Highway 64
  - Texas State Highway Loop 64 (former)
  - Farm to Market Road 64
  - Texas Park Road 64
- Utah State Route 64
- Vermont Route 64
- Virginia State Route 64 (former)
- Wisconsin Highway 64

Territories:

- Puerto Rico Highway 64
- U.S. Virgin Islands Highway 64

== See also ==
- A64 (disambiguation)

Preceded by 63	Lists of highways 64	Succeeded by 65
