= K-65 (Kansas highway) =

State highway in Kansas, U.S.

K-65
- K-65 highlighted in red

Route information
- Maintained by KDOT
- Length: 11.160 mi (17.960 km)
- History: Designated as K-69 by 1932; renumbered K-65 by 1934

Major junctions
- West end: K-3 north of Bronson
- East end: K-31 in Mapleton

Location
- Country: United States
- State: Kansas
- Counties: Bourbon

Highway system
- Kansas State Highway System; Interstate; US; State; Spurs
← K-64	→ K-66

K-65 is an approximately 11.1-mile-long (17.9 km) west–east state highway located entirely within Bourbon County in eastern Kansas. K-65's western terminus is at K-3 north of Bronson. The highway travels east through the community of Xenia to its eastern terminus at K-31 in Mapleton. K-65 travels mostly through rural land and is a two-lane highway its entire length.

K-65 was first established in 1932, as K-69 to the former alignment of K-3. By 1934, it was renumbered as K-65 to avoid confusion with U.S. Route 69 (US-69), which had been extended into Kansas. Prior to 1957, K-65 originally turned north in Xenia and ended at K-31 in Osage. Then K-31 was rerouted onto a new alignment between Blue Mound and Mapleton. At this time K-65 was extended east on a new alignment from Xenia to Mapleton.

== Route description ==
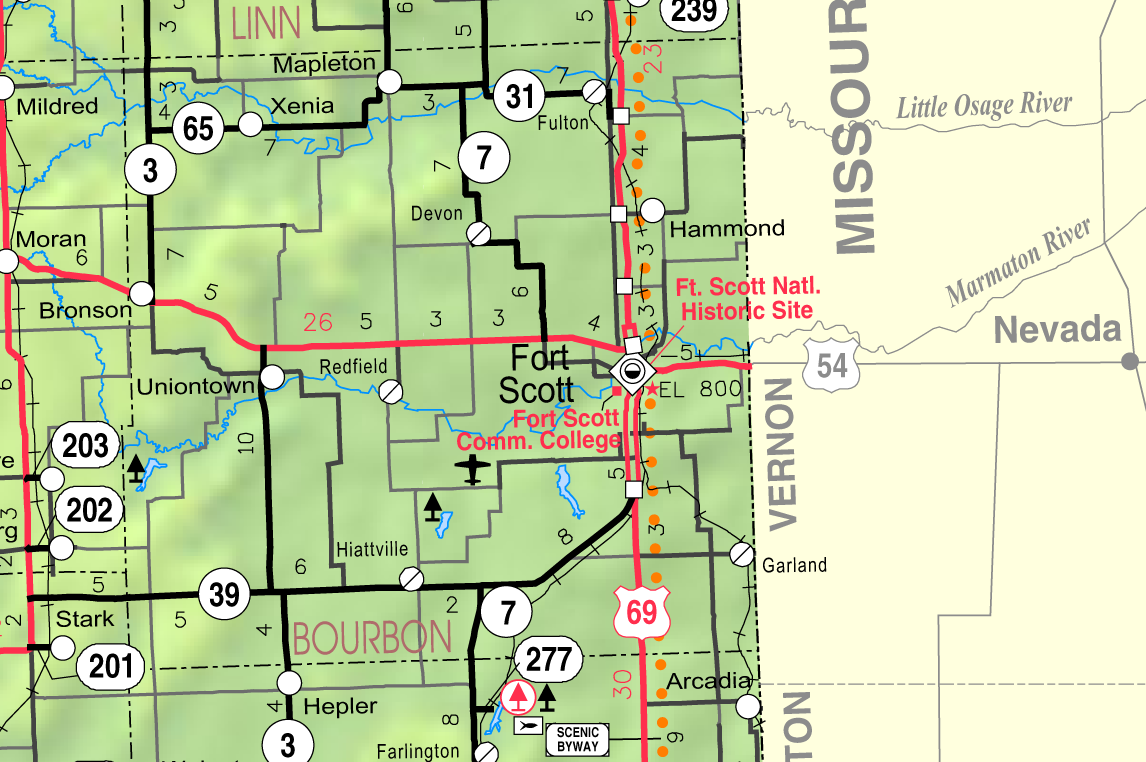
Map of Bourbon County (map legend)

K-65's western terminus is at K-3 roughly seven miles (11 km) north of Bronson and begins traveling east. The highway passes through farmlands with areas of trees then after 0.8 miles (1.3 km) the landscape opens up. The roadway continues for about 2.1 miles (3.4 km) and intersects 55th Street as trees begin to become more numerous. K-65 continues for one mile (1.6 km) and intersects 65th Street in the community of Xenia. From Xenia the highway progresses east through forested rolling hills for about 1.7 miles (2.7 km) then crosses the Little Osage River, a tributary of the Osage River. The highway continues roughly 0.9 miles (1.4 km) then passes under a transmission line and then intersects 95th Street by Northway Cemetery. K-65 continues through mostly open pastures for roughly 1.9 miles (3.1 km) then curves north as it briefly parallels Little Osage River. The roadway continues north for 0.75 miles (1.21 km) then curves east as it crosses Opossum Creek, a tributary of the Little Osage River. K-65 then crosses Baker Brook, a tributary of Opossum Creek, then enters Mapleton becoming Washington Street. The highway curves north and continues for 0.45 miles (0.72 km) to Sixth Street where it turns east. K-65 then reaches its eastern terminus at K-31, which continues east as Sixth Street and north as Main Street.

K-65 is maintained by the Kansas Department of Transportation (KDOT), and is a two-lane road its entire length. KDOT tracks the traffic levels on its highways, and in 2019, they determined that on average the traffic varied from 130 vehicles per day near the western terminus to 160 vehicles per day near the eastern terminus. K-52 is not included in the National Highway System. The National Highway System is a system of highways important to the nation's defense, economy, and mobility. The majority of the route is paved with partial design bituminous pavement except the portion within Mapleton which is full design bituminous pavement.

== History ==
By 1927, a former K-65 was established as a state highway from US-36 by Lebanon north to the Nebraska border. By 1934, the highway was decommissioned and became a section of US-281 when it was extended into Kansas.

K-3 formerly turned east and entered Xenia, where it turned back north and terminated at K-38. By 1932, K-3 was realigned to travel directly north to K-3, and the former section of K-3 through Xenia became K-69. K-69 was renumbered to K-65 sometime between April 1933 and 1934, to avoid confusion when US-69 was extended into Kansas. Between 1936 and 1937, K-38 became an extension of K-31. Before 1957, K-65 originally turned north in Xenia and ended at K-31 in Osage. Then in an October 9, 1957 resolution K-31 was rerouted further east on K-52 from Blue Mound, bypassing Osage, then left K-52 and went directly south to Mapleton. At this time K-65 was extended east on a new alignment from Xenia to Mapleton. The current bridge over the Little Osage River was built in 1962.

The section of K-65 east of Xenia by the Little Osage River, has had to close briefly numerous times due to flooding. On September 22, 1970, the highway was closed at the river due to water covering the roadway from heavy rain. Heavy rain from thunderstorms caused a section of the highway by the river to close on April 20, 1973. On November 4, 1974, the section of K-65 by the river was closed due to flooding, when over seven inches (18 cm) of rain fell in parts of southeast Kansas. On October 3, 1986, heavy rain from remnants of Hurricane Paine caused flooding that closed a section of the roadway at the river crossing.

== Major intersections ==
The entire route is in Bourbon County.

Location	mi	km	Destinations	Notes
Franklin Township	0.000	0.000	K-3 – Bronson	Western terminus
Mapleton	11.160	17.960	K-31 to K-52 – Fulton	Eastern terminus; road continues as K-31 east (6th Street east)
1.000 mi = 1.609 km; 1.000 km = 0.621 mi
