= K64 =

K64 or K-64 may refer to:

- K-64 (Kansas highway), a state highway in Kansas
- HMS Hollyhock (K64), a UK Royal Navy ship
- Soviet submarine K-64
