= Route 64 (disambiguation) =

Route 64 may refer to:

- Route 64 (MTA Maryland), a bus route in Baltimore, Maryland and its suburbs
- London Buses route 64
- Route 64 (WMATA), a bus route in Washington, D.C.
- Melbourne tram route 64

== See also ==
- List of highways numbered 64
