= Xenia, Kansas =

- Unincorporated community
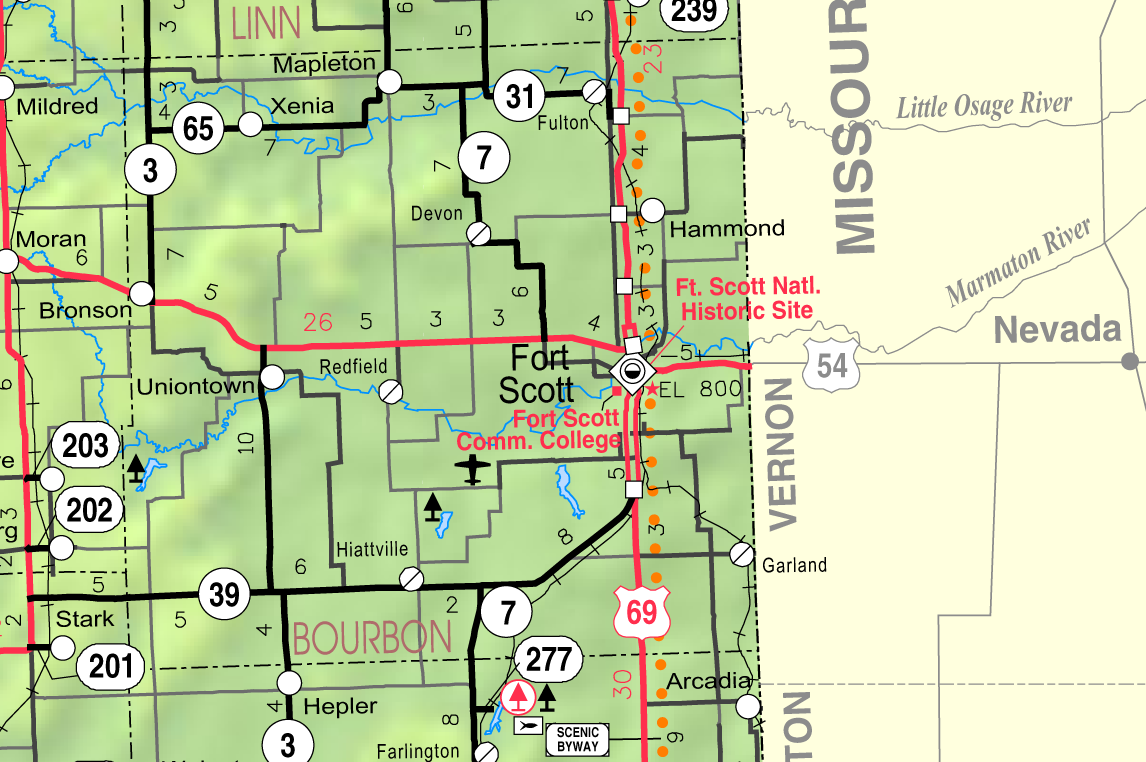
- KDOT map of Bourbon County (legend)
- Coordinates: 37°59′43″N 94°59′11″W
- Country: United States
- State: Kansas
- County: Bourbon
- Founded: 1858
- Elevation: 1,047 ft (319 m)
- Time zone: UTC-6 (CST)
  - Summer (DST): UTC-5 (CDT)
- Area code: 620
- FIPS code: 20-80600
- GNIS ID: 474541

Xenia (/ˈziːniə/ ZEE-nee-ə) is an unincorporated area in Franklin Township, Bourbon County, Kansas, United States.

== History ==
Settling in the Xenia area in 1856, the year after Bourbon County was organized in 1855, were John Van Syckle, Samuel Stephenson and Charles Anderson.

John Van Syckle and his father laid out Xenia's village plat in 1858. The community was named after Xenia, Ohio. The younger Van Syckle opened the village's first store, offering general merchandise.

Xenia gained a post office on November 29, 1858, when the Peru (Linn County) post office was moved to Xenia. Peru, which is now a ghost town, had a post office from August 5 to November 29, 1858. As well as being Xenia's first merchant, John Van Syckle became Xenia's first postmaster.

The first church building was built in 1876 by the Methodists.

In 1878, Franklin township was Bourbon County's fourth-most populous, at 1,474. The county seat of Fort Scott had 5,081 residents. Scott Township had 2,036. Marion Township, just south of Franklin in the county's west end, had 1,676.

In 1910, Xenia had a money-order post office and population of 115. Xenia Post Office closed Aug. 31, 1926.

== Geography ==
Located at an altitude of 1,047 feet (317 m), Xenia lies in Bourbon County's northwestern corner, along K-65, west of the confluence of the Little Osage River and Limestone Creek, about 18 miles northwest of Fort Scott.
