= Franklin Township, Bourbon County, Kansas =

Franklin Township Bourbon County, Kansas
- Township
- Location within Bourbon County
- Coordinates: 37°58′10″N 095°00′21″W
- Country: United States
- State: Kansas
- County: Bourbon

Area
  - Total: 71.55 sq mi (185.32 km^{2})
  - Land: 71.46 sq mi (185.08 km^{2})
  - Water: 0.093 sq mi (0.24 km^{2}) 0.13%
- Elevation: 902 ft (275 m)

Population (2000)
  - Total: 312
  - Density: 4.4/sq mi (1.7/km^{2})
- GNIS feature ID: 0474536

Franklin Township is a township in Bourbon County, Kansas, United States. As of the 2000 census, its population was 312.

== Geography ==
Franklin Township covers an area of 71.55 square miles (185.3 km^{2}) and contains no incorporated settlements. According to the USGS, it contains two cemeteries: Boulware and Stevenson.

The Little Osage River and smaller streams of Bell Branch, Buck Run, Irish Creek, Limestone Creek, Owl Creek and Ross Branch run through this township.
