= A64 =

A64 or A-64 may refer to:

== Roads ==
- A64 road (England), a road connecting Leeds and Scarborough
- A64 motorway (France), a road connecting Toulouse and Bayonne
- A64 motorway (Germany), a road connecting the city of Luxembourg and Trier
- A64 highway (Spain), a road connecting the Autovía A-64 junction 367 km and Oviedo

== Computing ==
- AMD64, a CPU architecture (further abbreviation A64)
- An Athlon 64 CPU
- A64 system on a chip designed by Allwinner Technology
- A64 (emulator), a Commodore 64 emulator for the Amiga
- Instruction set of AArch64

== Other uses ==
- Benoni Defense, in the Encyclopaedia of Chess Openings (code "A64")
