= New Jersey Route 92 =

Proposed state highway in New Jersey, US

Route 92

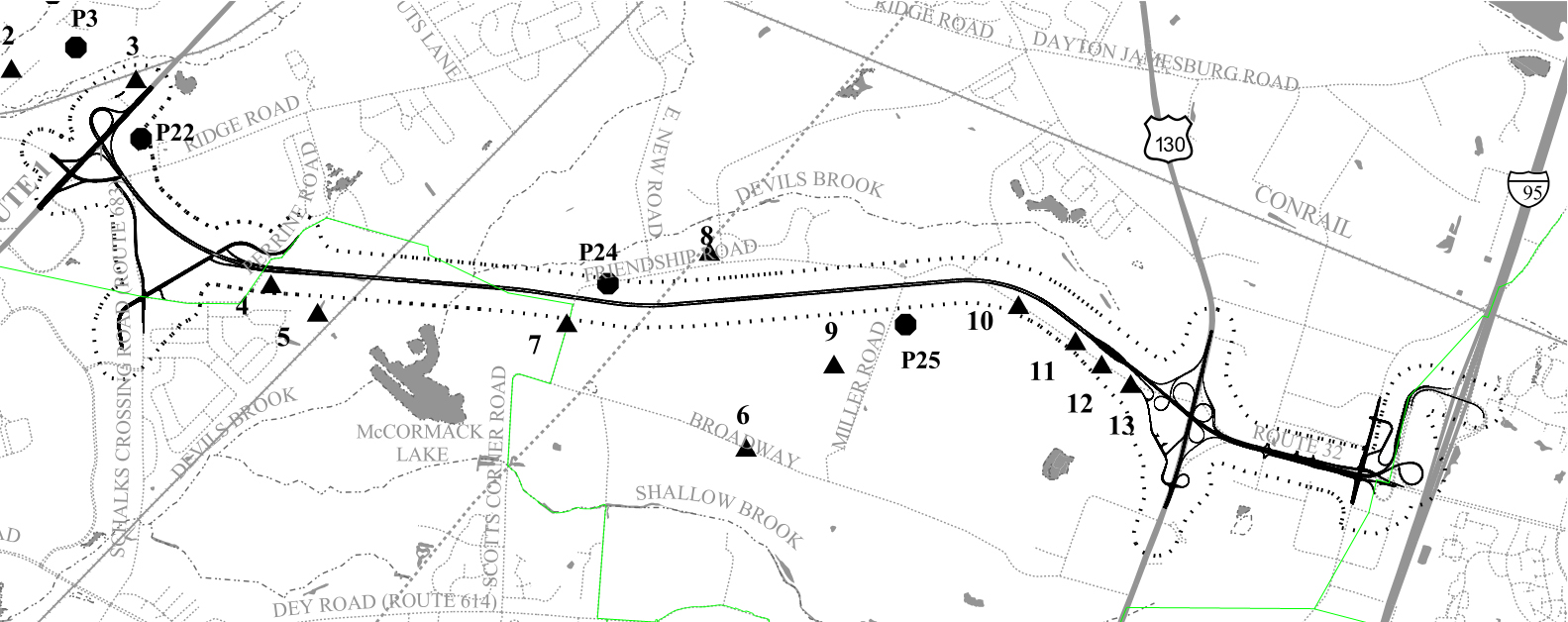
- A map of Route 92 from US Army Corps of Engineers

Route information
- Maintained by NJDOT
- Length: 6.7 mi (10.8 km) Length of Route 92 post-1994 changes.
- Existed: 1950s–December 1, 2006 (never built)

Major junctions
- West end: US 1 in South Brunswick Township
- US 130 in South Brunswick Township
- East end: I-95 / N.J. Turnpike in Monroe Township

Location
- Country: United States
- State: New Jersey
- Counties: Somerset, Middlesex, Mercer

Highway system
- New Jersey State Highway Routes; Interstate; US; State; Scenic Byways
← Route 91	→ Route 93

Route 92 was a 6.7-mile (10.8 km) proposed branch of the New Jersey Turnpike that would have run from west to east, beginning at U.S. Route 1 just north of Ridge Road (old CR 522) in South Brunswick Township, east along Route 32, to Exit 8A in Monroe Township. Route 92 was also assigned in the 1953 renumbering and by the late 1950s it was named the Princeton–Hightstown Bypass, a freeway planned to connect the Somerset Freeway (an unbuilt section of Interstate 95) in Montgomery Township (near Skillman), with Route 33 in East Windsor Township (east of Hightstown). In 1987, the planned Route 92 was truncated to only run east from U.S. Route 1 near Kingston. New plans were announced in 1994, this time running to US 1 near Princeton. After public hearings found opposition was still strong, the planned route was truncated to a much shorter bypass of Hightstown only and numbered Route 133. Construction on the road, the first project awarded under New Jersey's modified Design-build program, began on September 20, 1996 and was opened November 30, 1999.

The first plans for Route 92's new alignment, running from exit 8A of the New Jersey Turnpike (rather than exit 8) west to U.S. Route 206 near Rocky Hill, were made in 1988, using funds from the canceled Somerset Freeway. In 1992, the plans were formally transferred to the New Jersey Turnpike Authority, which announced the new plans in 1994, again dropping the segment west of US 1. All but $6.5 million of the $400 million project was reassigned in November 2005 to widen the Turnpike in southern New Jersey.

== History ==
=== Princeton–Hightstown alignment ===
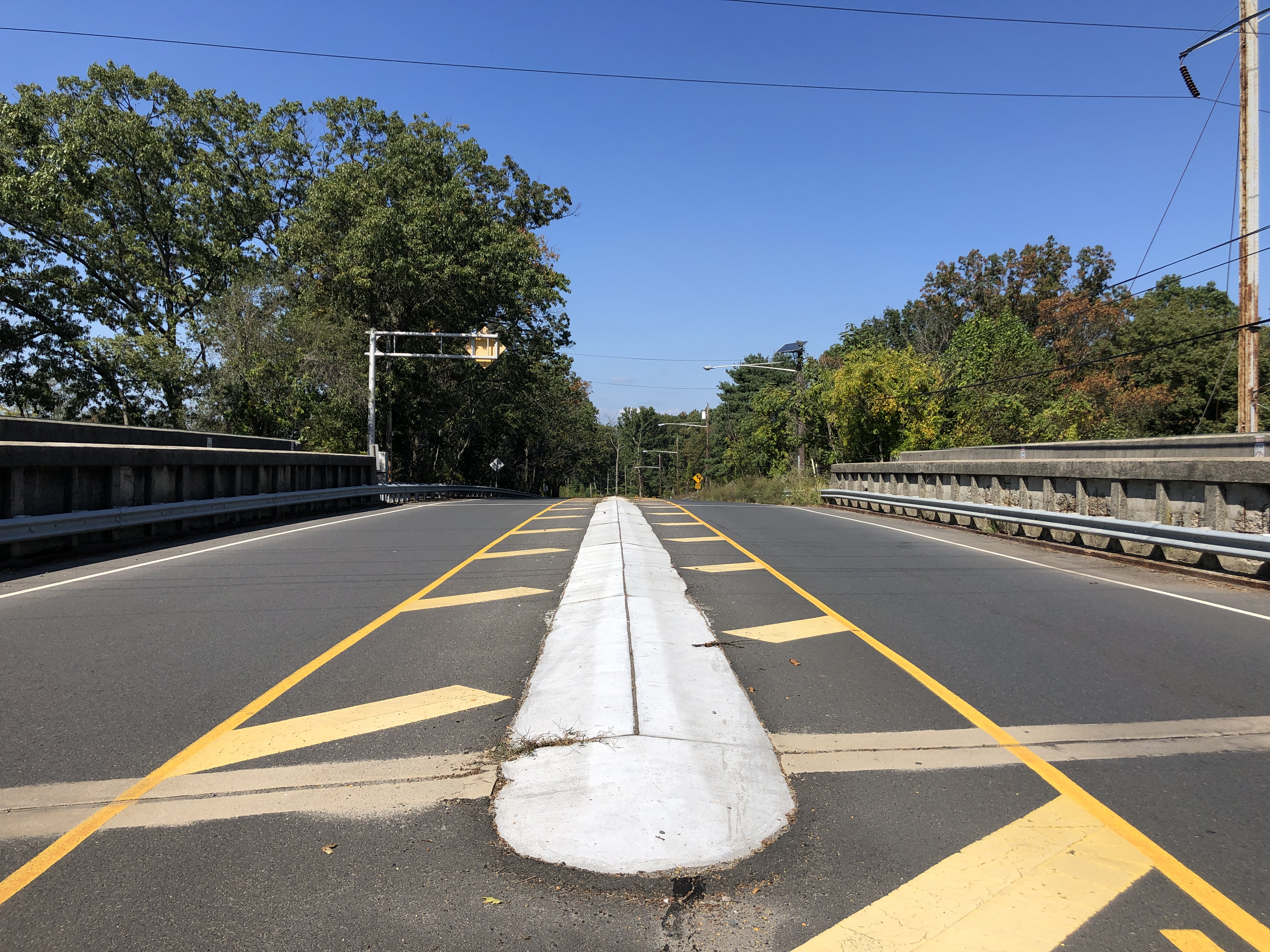
Route 64, a built portion of the original Route 31-A Freeway, which spawned Route 92

The first proposed alignments for a freeway from the borough of Princeton to the community of Hightstown originates in the designation of State Highway Route 31-A in 1938 by the New Jersey State Legislature. Construction commenced on the new route, building a new bridge over the Pennsylvania Railroad a year later. This new, 104.00-foot-long (31.70 m) bridge replaced the at-grade crossing on Washington Road, which is now a dead-end. When the state highway renumbering occurred on January 1, 1953, the new freeway proposals were designated as Route 92. (Route 31-A was decommissioned at that point, and repealed from state law in 1992.) The first assigned alignment of the Route 92 Freeway dates to the late 1950s, when the New Jersey State Highway Department as the Princeton-Hightstown Bypass, a new freeway to connect the Somerset Freeway (an unbuilt portion of Interstate 95 in the Montgomery Township community of Skillman) eastward to a junction with Route 33 in the community of East Windsor Township (east of Hightstown). This new freeway was to be constructed by the State Highway Department and maintained by the aforementioned corporation. By 1967, the New Jersey Department of Transportation announced plans and although monetary issues stalled any forward movements, federal funding soon came in to help resume planning.

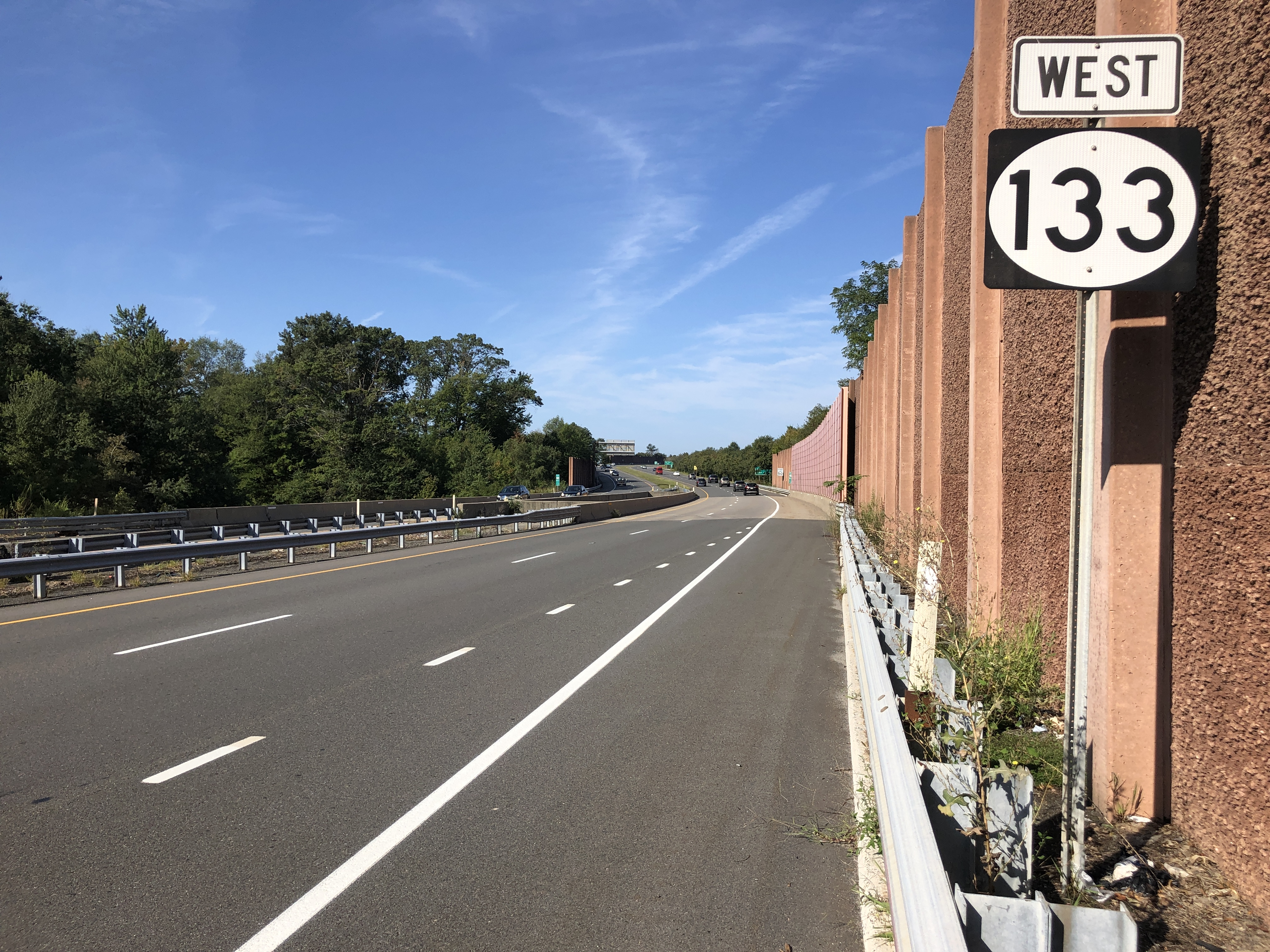
Route 133 westbound past US 130. Route 133 was completed in 1999 as a project made separate from Route 92

The highway was proposed and received opposition from the communities of Princeton and Plainsboro, who cited destruction of open space and wetlands, which would reduce the quality of local life. In 1982, the Somerset Freeway was canceled as a project, and the $228 million (1982 USD) that came with it was given around by a partnership, with the New Jersey Department of Transportation suggesting the Route 92 Freeway become one of the six projects to receive funding. Final designs for the freeway were underway in 1986, amid controversy. As a result, the Department of Transportation dropped the section west of U.S. Route 1 in South Brunswick Township only a year later. After plans for Route 92 were realigned northward in 1988, the Princeton-Hightstown Bypass was revived in 1994 for construction of a new bypass of Hightstown. This new, 3.8-mile-long (6.1 km) freeway was designed under the Department of Transportation's first modified design-build program and construction commenced in 1996. The contractors in hire for the project were the Schaivone Construction Group, who set a bid for $57 million (1996 USD). The new freeway, designated as Route 133 instead of Route 92, was opened in November 1999, ending the four-decade fight to construction freeway around Hightstown. The delay occurred due to substantial erosion caused by the weakening Hurricane Floyd in 1999.

=== Turnpike Extension alignment ===
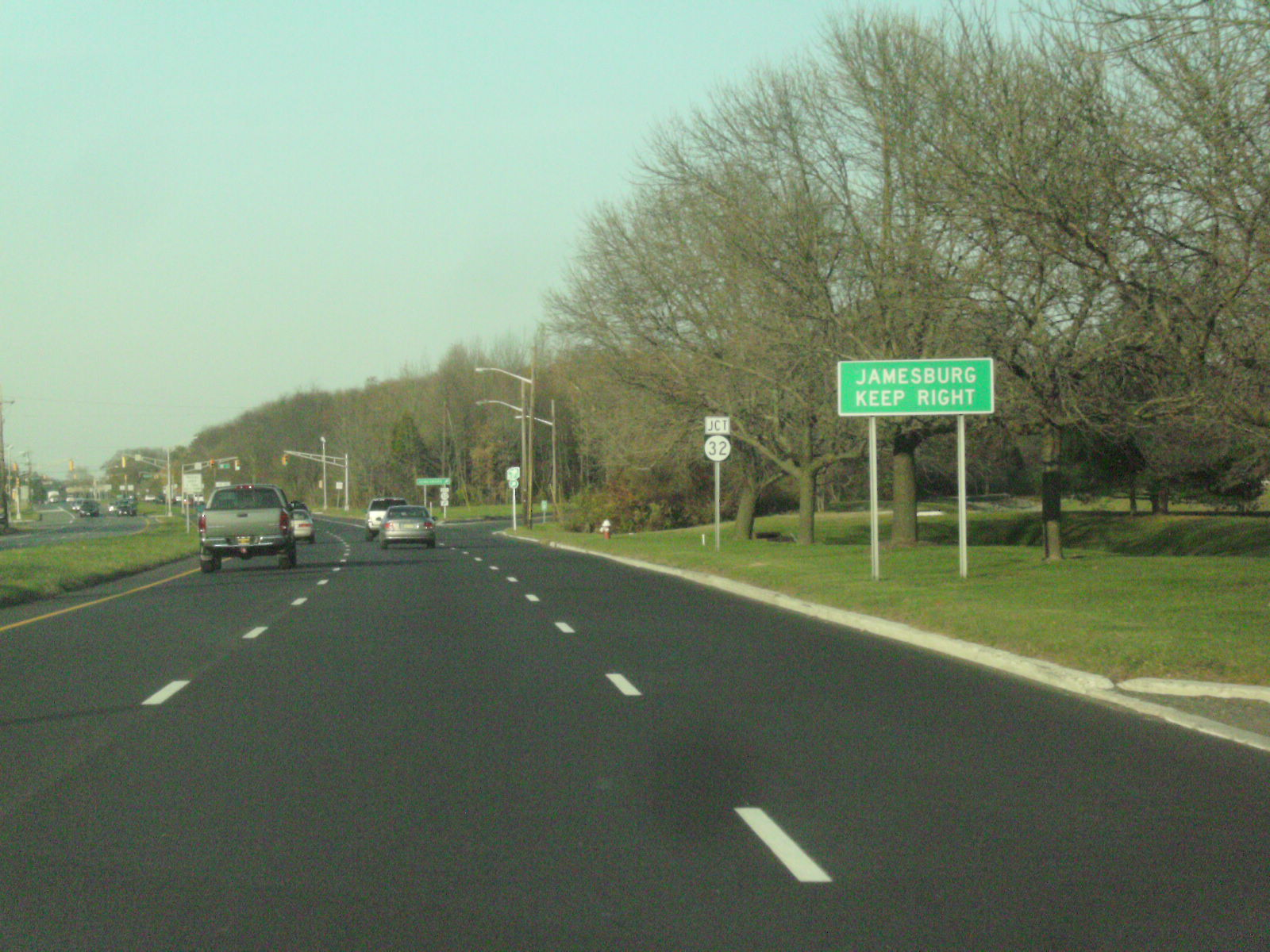
Route 130 northbound approaching the interchange with Route 32 in South Brunswick Township. Route 92's newer alignment was supposed to interchange with U.S. Route 130 here

In 1988, the New Jersey Department of Transportation realigned the proposed Route 92 Freeway off the Princeton-Hightstown Bypass to a route further north. This new alignment was to run from U.S. Route 206 near the community of Rocky Hill in Somerset County to Interchange 8A on the New Jersey Turnpike in Monroe Township in Middlesex County, using the alignment of Route 32 at its eastern terminus. The state cited that this new northerly alignment, funded by the cancellation of the Somerset Freeway, would serve better needs of the people. In 1992, the proposal for Route 92 was turned over to the New Jersey Turnpike Authority from the Department of Transportation, citing the cost was too elevated. Two years later, the Turnpike Authority released new plans for the Route 92 alignment, this time creating a 6.7-mile-long (10.8 km) limited-access highway from U.S. Route 1 in South Brunswick Township to Interchange 8A in Monroe Township. This new highway was to cost the Turnpike Authority $300 million (1994 USD). The opposition to the freeway shifted northward, with South Brunswick residents complaining the divide of their community. The environmentalists also cried foul on the destruction of 33 acres (130,000 m^{2}) of marsh and the encroachment on local open space. Giving their hands to these factors, the Environmental Protection Agency opposed this project twice during the 1990s, once in January 1997 and once in October 1998. The state realigned the proposals to reduce the loss of wetlands, and also proposed the addition of 57 new acres (230,000 m^{2}) of wetlands. This proposal gained the support of the state's Department of Environmental Protection, but not the federal.

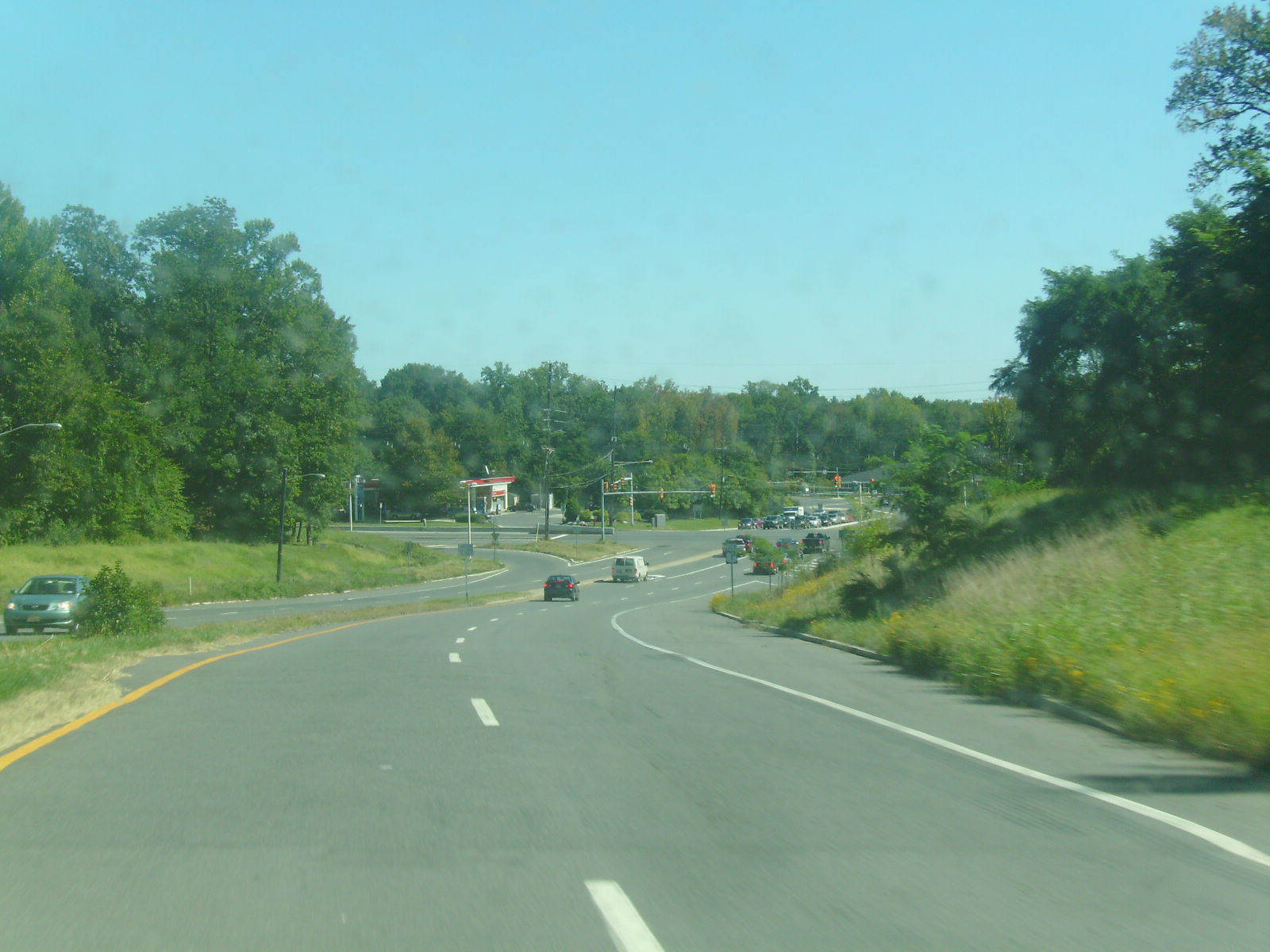
Promenade Boulevard, built as part of the Route 522 upgrade, a project to stop Route 92

In February 2000, the Turnpike Authority gave in to the orders from the U.S. Army Corps of Engineers to have Route 92 undergo an environmental impact study, which could go up to two years, to help see if they should award the contract for construction. Opponents of the Route 92 project hailed this decision for the thought that the environmental impact statement (EIS) would back up their beliefs. Four months later, the Army Corps of Engineers held a meeting to decide what to take into account for the impact statement and held opinions from both the supporters and opponents of the freeway. Around this time, locals sent an editorial to News 12 New Jersey to say that Middlesex County Route 522, already a four-lane freeway, should become the primary freeway across the portion of Middlesex County. However, the Turnpike Authority replied citing that Route 522 would be inadequate to handle the amount of traffic by 2015 that Route 92 was to handle. In December 2003, the Army Corps of Engineers approved the statement and although agencies still disagreed on the wetlands issues, held public hearings in 2004.

In 2005, the Turnpike Authority relocated most of the Route 92 funding to the widening of the New Jersey Turnpike through the southern and central portions of New Jersey. The remaining funds, $6.5 million (2005 USD), left the project in limbo, and the Army Corps of Engineers released a final statement, finding no other alternative outside of a new alignment. On December 1, 2006, the New Jersey Turnpike Authority terminated its plans to build the spur from Ridge and 1 in South Brunswick to 8A in Monroe. Since most of the Route 92 funds had already been diverted to the Turnpike Authority's main concern, it made more sense to cancel the spur due to lack of funding. The Authority's main focus was widening the Turnpike between Exits 6 in Mansfield Township and 8A in Monroe Township in anticipation of increased traffic coming from the Pennsylvania Turnpike when its interchange with I-95 is completed.

== Proposed alignments ==
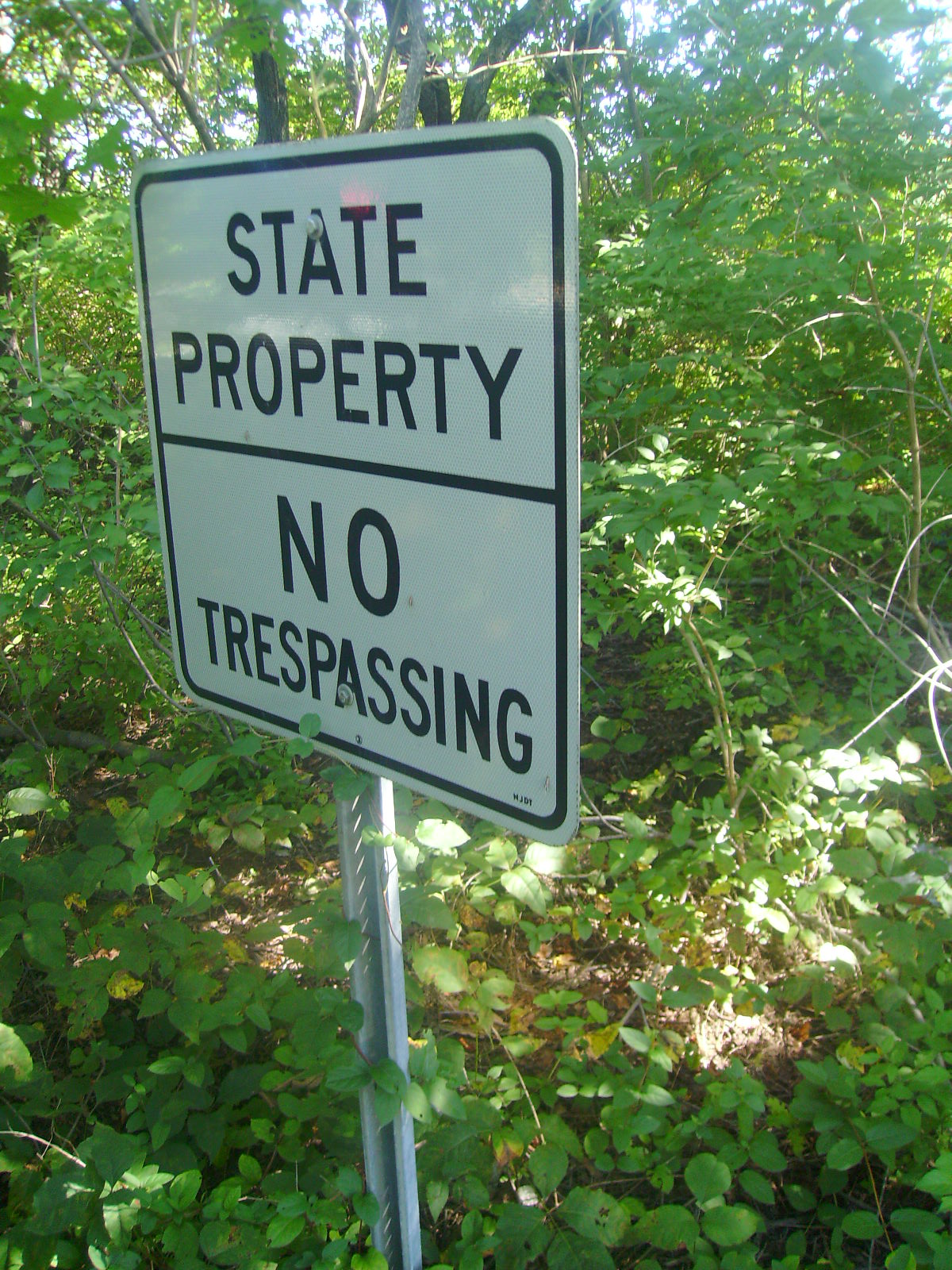
Right-of-way kept for the Route 92 Freeway at milepost 4 on Route 27 in Kingston, Somerset County

=== Princeton–Hightstown Bypass ===
The first alignment of the Route 92 Freeway, proposed in the 1950s, was to begin at an interchange with Interstate 95, known as the Somerset Freeway in the community of Skillman (in Montgomery Township). The route was supposed to head eastward, crossing an interchange with U.S. Route 206 in Montgomery Township before crossing over County Route 518 in Rocky Hill and interchanging with New Jersey Route 27 in Kingston. The route would then turn to the south and interchange with U.S. Route 1 and County Route 522 in the community of Monmouth Junction. From there, Route 92 would cross over the Pennsylvania Railroad to the north of New Jersey Route 64 in Plainsboro, turning to the southeast along the Millstone River. After crossing the Millstone, Route 92 was to interchange with County Route 535 in Cranbury before entering East Windsor, where it would interchange with U.S. Route 130. From there, the route would meet the New Jersey Turnpike at Interchange 8 before reaching its eastern terminus at an interchange with New Jersey Route 33 in the Twin Rivers community in East Windsor.

=== Turnpike Extension alignment (post-1994) ===
On the turnpike extension alignment proposed in 1994 that would be maintained by the New Jersey Turnpike Authority, Route 92 was to begin at a trumpet interchange with U.S. Route 1 in South Brunswick. The interchange would have also served access to Schalks Crossing Road (Middlesex CR 683). The highway was to head to the southeast and cross under Perrine Road, which was proposed to have a brand new overpass and a westbound interchange. (There was also to be an eastbound entrance ramp from Perrine Road.) After curving to the east, Route 92 was to enter Plainsboro, cross the New Jersey Transit's Northeast Corridor Line and Devil's Brook, and then re-enter South Brunswick. Upon entrance in South Brunswick, Route 92 would have passed through the western section of an inland freshwater marsh, which has been the source of the Lawrence Brook. Then, it would pass to the south of a municipal landfill in Sondek Park owned by the Township of South Brunswick. Continuing east-southeast from there, it would have intersected with Friendship Road and would have continued along with Friendship Road past the next intersection with Miller Road. There, Route 92 was to turn to the southeast along with Friendship Road and cross through a toll station. It would have entered a large interchange with U.S. Route 130 and an access route to Friendship Road. Route 92's interchange with Route 130 was to be a cloverleaf interchange and from there, the highway was to follow current day Route 32 through Monroe Township. There, the highway was to continue southeastward, interchanging with local roads and continuing through an interchange with County Route 535 before merging into Interchange 8A with the New Jersey Turnpike, where Route 92 was to end. The whole highway would’ve been arranged similarly to Pennsylvania Route 66 (PA Turnpike 66), in that it would’ve been a state route maintained by a toll agency

== Proposed interchanges ==
=== Route 92 (Princeton-Hightstown) ===
County	Location	mi	km	Destinations	Notes
Somerset	Montgomery			I-95 (Somerset Freeway)	Proposed western terminus of Route 92.
Somerset	Rocky Hill			US 206	
Somerset	Franklin			Route 27	
Middlesex	South Brunswick			US 1	
Middlesex	Cranbury			CR 535	
Mercer	East Windsor			US 130	
Mercer	East Windsor			N.J. Turnpike	Interchange 8 (NJ Turnpike)
Mercer	East Windsor			Route 33	Proposed eastern terminus of Route 92
1.000 mi = 1.609 km; 1.000 km = 0.621 mi

=== Route 92 (post-1994) ===
The entire route was in Middlesex County.

Location	mi	km	Destinations	Notes
South Brunswick Township	0.0	0.0	US 1	Proposed western terminus of Route 92.
South Brunswick Township	0.8	1.3	Perrine Road	Westbound interchange only.
South Brunswick Township	5.5	8.9	US 130 / Friendship Road	Cloverleaf interchange.
Monroe Township	6.7	10.8	I-95 / N.J. Turnpike	Interchange 8A (NJTP/I-95); Proposed eastern terminus of Route 92
1.000 mi = 1.609 km; 1.000 km = 0.621 mi
