= Stockton Street Historic District =

Historic district in New Jersey, United States

- U.S. National Register of Historic Places
- U.S. Historic district
- New Jersey Register of Historic Places
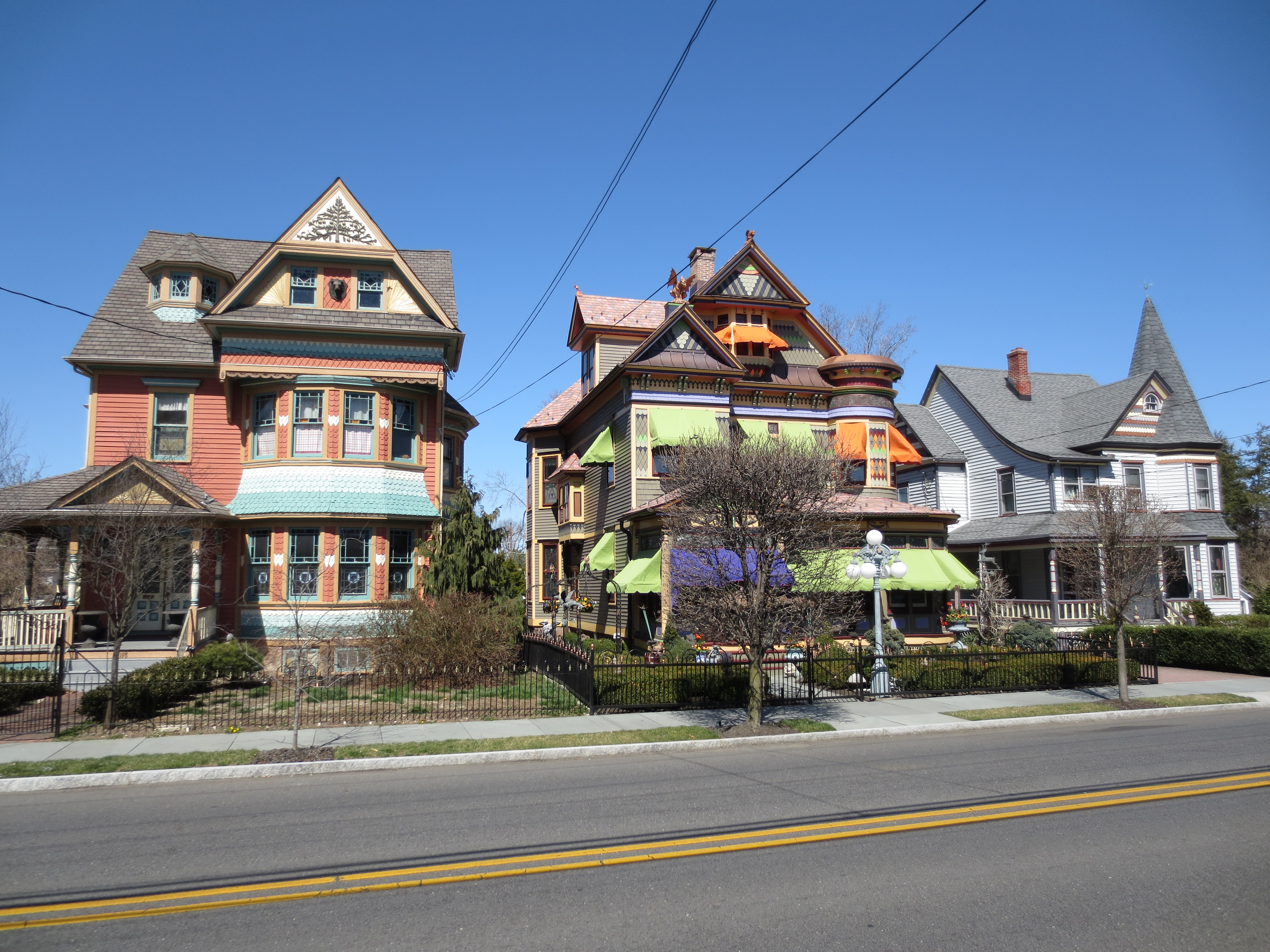

- Location within Mercer County, New Jersey Location within New Jersey Location within the United States
- Location: 126-326 Stockton Street, 219-237 Rogers Avenue, Hightstown, NJ 08520
- Coordinates: 40°16′14.8″N 74°31′40.6″W
- Area: 14.35 acres (5.81 ha)
- Built: 1830-1915
- Architect: Multiple
- Architectural style: Queen Anne, Gothic, Italianate, Federal, Colonial
- NRHP reference No.: 05001331
- NJRHP No.: 4447

Significant dates
- Added to NRHP: November 25, 2005
- Designated NJRHP: May 13, 2005

The Stockton Street Historic District covers both sides of Stockton Street (CR 571), from Railroad Avenue to Summit Street, and a portion of Rogers Avenue in Hightstown, New Jersey. It is notable for its Victorian homes, First Methodist Church, and the Hightstown Civil War monument. It is also significant for its association with the introduction of rail service to New Jersey, as the first railroad in the United States to connect two major cities, New York and Philadelphia, originally ran along what is now Railroad Avenue at the eastern end of the district. In 1832, the John Bull, the first locomotive in the country, provided the first steam-powered passenger rail service in the country, stopping at Stockton Street. In July 2015, Hightstown became a Preserve America community which enhances historic preservation, including the district.

== See also ==
- National Register of Historic Places listings in Mercer County, New Jersey
