= County Route 571 (New Jersey) =

County highway in New Jersey, U.S.

County Route 571
- CR 571 highlighted in red

Route information
- Maintained by Ocean, Monmouth, and Mercer County Departments of Transportation, NJDOT, and Princeton
- Length: 43.9 mi (70.7 km)

Major junctions
- South end: Route 37 in Toms River
- US 9 in Toms River; Route 70 in Manchester; Route 33 in Hightstown; US 130 in East Windsor; Route 133 in East Windsor; CR 526 in West Windsor; US 1 in West Windsor
- North end: Route 27 in Princeton

Location
- Country: United States
- State: New Jersey
- Counties: Ocean, Monmouth, Mercer

Highway system
- County routes in New Jersey; 500-series routes
← CR 569	→ CR 573

County Route 571 (CR 571) is a county highway in the U.S. state of New Jersey. The highway extends 43.9 miles (70.7 km) from New Jersey Route 37 in Toms River to Nassau Street (New Jersey Route 27) in Princeton. Though it is designated a north–south county route by the New Jersey Department of Transportation, it is geographically northwest-southeast and signed both as north–south and east–west inconsistently as a result.

== Route description ==
=== Ocean and Monmouth counties ===
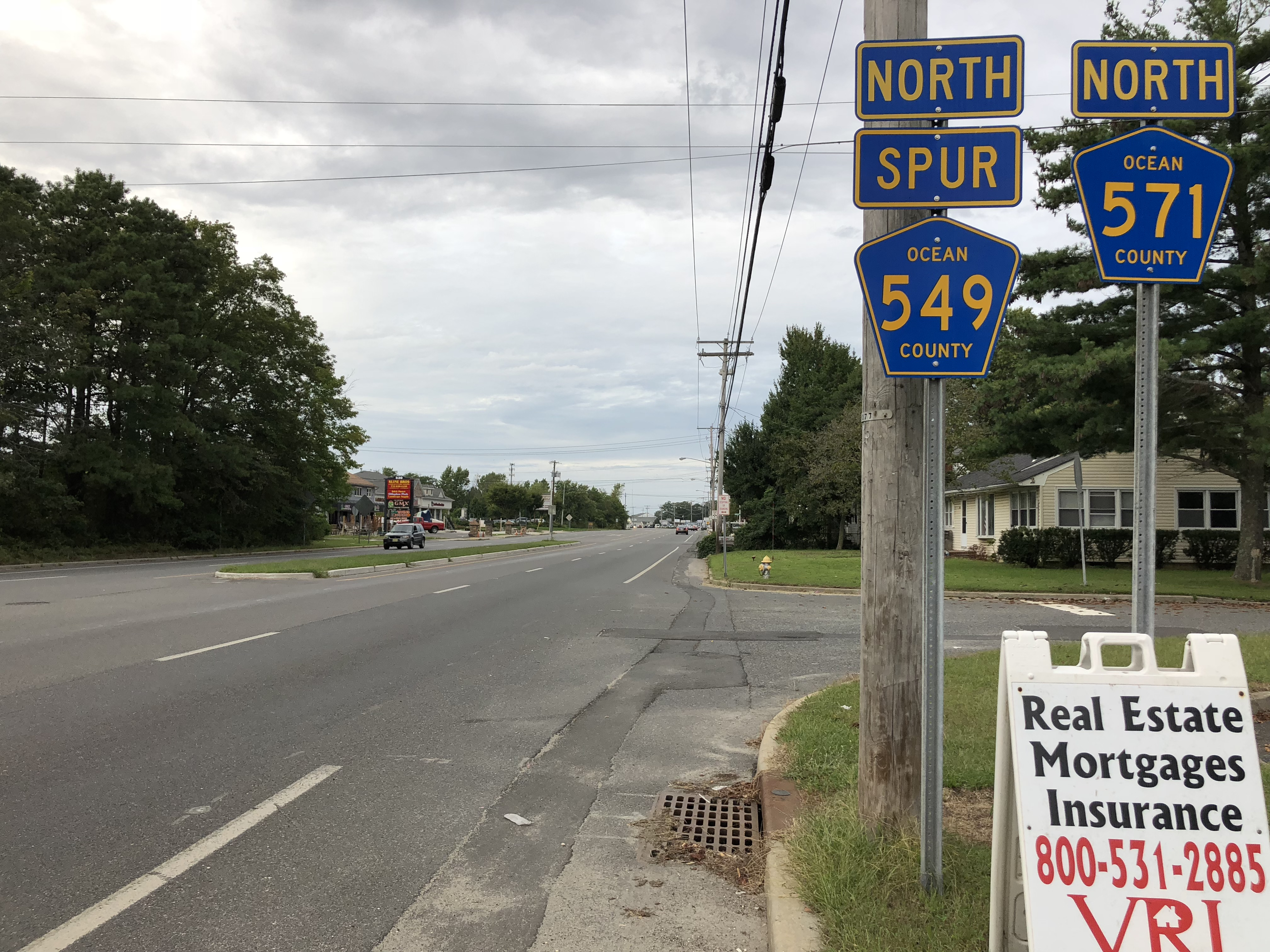
CR 549 Spur/CR 571 northbound past Route 37 in Toms River

CR 571 begins at an intersection of Route 37 in Toms River, Ocean County, heading north on four-lane divided Fischer Boulevard concurrent with CR 549 Spur. The road continues north through business areas, with the median turning into a center left-turn lane. The routes turn northwest through residential and commercial areas along with some marshland from the Barnegat Bay to the east, with alternating segments of median and center left-turn lane. CR 571 splits from CR 549 Spur by heading west onto two-lane undivided Bay Avenue into areas of homes. The road intersects with Vaughn Avenue (CR 627) before turning more to the northwest and becoming four lanes at the intersection of Cedar Grove Road (CR 22). The route widens into a divided highway as it passes between the Ocean County Mall to the north and the Seacourt Pavilion shopping center to the south and intersects with Hooper Avenue (CR 549) at an at-grade cloverleaf interchange. After this, CR 571 becomes Bey Lea Road and becomes undivided again as it passes through more wooded areas of development, with the northbound direction narrowing to one lane at the intersection of North Bay Avenue (CR 18) as it turns west. After crossing the intersection of Old Freehold Road (CR 623, the road becomes three lanes, with two westbound lanes and one eastbound lane, as it heads northwest past more businesses on Indian Head Road. The route runs west near a few homes before passing under the Garden State Parkway and reaching the intersection of Lakewood Road (US 9).

CR 571 becomes four lanes at this point and passes residences to the north and a shopping center to the south prior to intersecting with Whitesville Road (CR 527). CR 571 turns northwest to join CR 527 on Whitesville Road, passing wooded areas of housing developments. CR 527 splits from CR 571 by turning north on Whitesville Road, and CR 571 continues northwest along Ridgeway Road, entering Manchester. The road continues through forested development as it comes to the intersection of Route 70. At this point, the route narrows to two lanes and passes through more wooded areas with occasional residences, crossing the Southern Secondary railroad line operated by the Delaware and Raritan River Railroad. CR 571 crosses the intersection of South Hope Chapel Road (CR 547) before heading into Jackson, becoming Toms River Road. The route runs through forested areas of the Pine Barrens with intermittent residential development for several miles, eventually turning north and coming to the intersection of West Veterans Highway (CR 528) in the community of Cassville. The road becomes Cassville Road at this intersection and passes Cassville Lake as it comes to the intersection of Freehold Road (CR 638). CR 571 continues north past more wooded areas of homes before coming to an intersection of West Commodore Boulevard (CR 526). At this point, CR 526 turns north to form a concurrency with CR 571 and the two routes continue through forests on Trenton-Lakewood Road, passing under I-195 prior to coming to the intersection of Monmouth Road (CR 537).

At the intersection of Monmouth Road (CR 537, CR 526/CR 571 continues into Millstone Township in Monmouth County and continues northwest through more forested areas of homes before CR 526 splits from CR 571 by heading west on Trenton-Lakewood Road. CR 571 heads north along Millstone Road and comes to the intersection of Stagecoach Road (CR 524). Here, the route turns west to join CR 524 on Stagecoach Road, making a turn to the north at an intersection of Red Valley Road/Spring Road. The routes make a sharp turn to the southwest before CR 571 splits from CR 524 by heading north on Rising Sun Tavern Road. The route runs through forests with some homes and farms, curving to the northwest and entering Roosevelt, where it becomes Clarksburg Road and continues through wooded areas with some homes. CR 571 turns north onto South Rochdale Avenue and passes more residences. The route crosses back into Millstone Township and heads into areas of farmland and woodland, turning northwest at the intersection of Perrineville Road (CR 1).

=== Mercer County ===
CR 571 enters East Windsor in Mercer County and becomes Etra Road in the community of Etra, as it continues through a mix of farms, woods, and homes. The route turns north before curving northwest near Etra Lake and passing over the New Jersey Turnpike (I-95). The road heads west into Hightstown and passes homes before reaching an intersection of CR 539. CR 571 turns north to follow CR 539 on South Main Street at this point. Upon reaching Downtown Hightstown, northbound CR 539/CR 571 join Route 33 as it merges from Mercer Street onto Main Street. Traveling southbound, CR 539/571 follow Route 33 onto Mercer Street for one block before turning east onto Ward Street and then south onto South Main Street; those wanting to travel west onto Route 33 from northbound CR 539/571 must also use Ward Street. CR 571 then leaves the concurrency by turning to the west on Stockton Street. The route passes more residences, the Stockton Street Historic District, before crossing back into East Windsor and intersecting with US 130. The road heads northwest and becomes Princeton-Hightstown Road at this point and passes through commercial areas with a few farms, widening to four lanes just before the intersection of Route 133. A short distance later, CR 571 crosses the intersection of Old Trenton Road (CR 535) and heads west into West Windsor, passing through a mix of farmland, woodland, and residences. The road enters areas of residential subdivisions after it crosses the intersection of Southfield Road, crosses Bear Brook, and then turns northwest as it comes to the intersection of South Mill Road (CR 526).

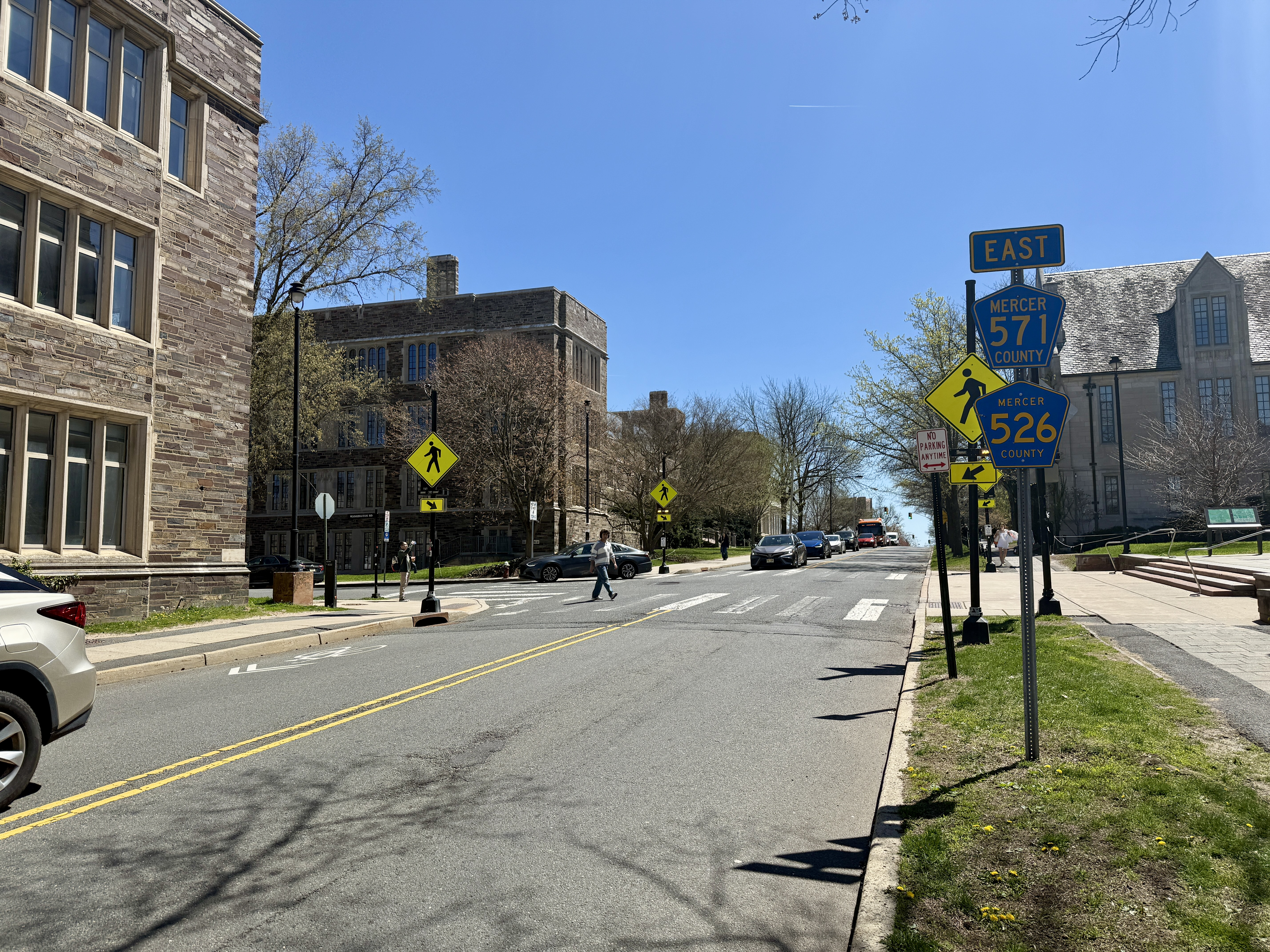
CR 571 past its northern terminus at Route 27 in Princeton.

At this point, CR 526 forms a signed (but not officially designated) concurrency with CR 571 for the remainder of the route, with the road intersecting with Hendrickson Drive (CR 607) prior to crossing the intersection of Clarksville Road (CR 638). The route narrows to two lanes and turns north at this point, passing a mix of homes and businesses as it reaches the intersection of Cranbury Road (CR 615). At this point, CR 571 becomes part of the state-maintained Route 64, a two-lane divided highway that carries the route over Amtrak's Northeast Corridor near the Princeton Junction Station at West Windsor serving Amtrak and NJ Transit's Northeast Corridor Line and Princeton Branch trains. Past the northern terminus of Route 64, CR 571 continues northwest on two-lane undivided Washington Road, passing through wooded residential areas before intersecting with US 1 at the modified Penns Neck Circle. Past the intersection, the road runs through the historic Washington Road Elm Allée, rows of Princeton elm trees that line both sides of the road. The road descends a hill before crossing the Delaware and Raritan Canal and Lake Carnegie into Princeton. At this point, CR 571 runs through the heart of the Princeton University campus, reaching its northern terminus at the intersection of Nassau Street (Route 27).

== History ==
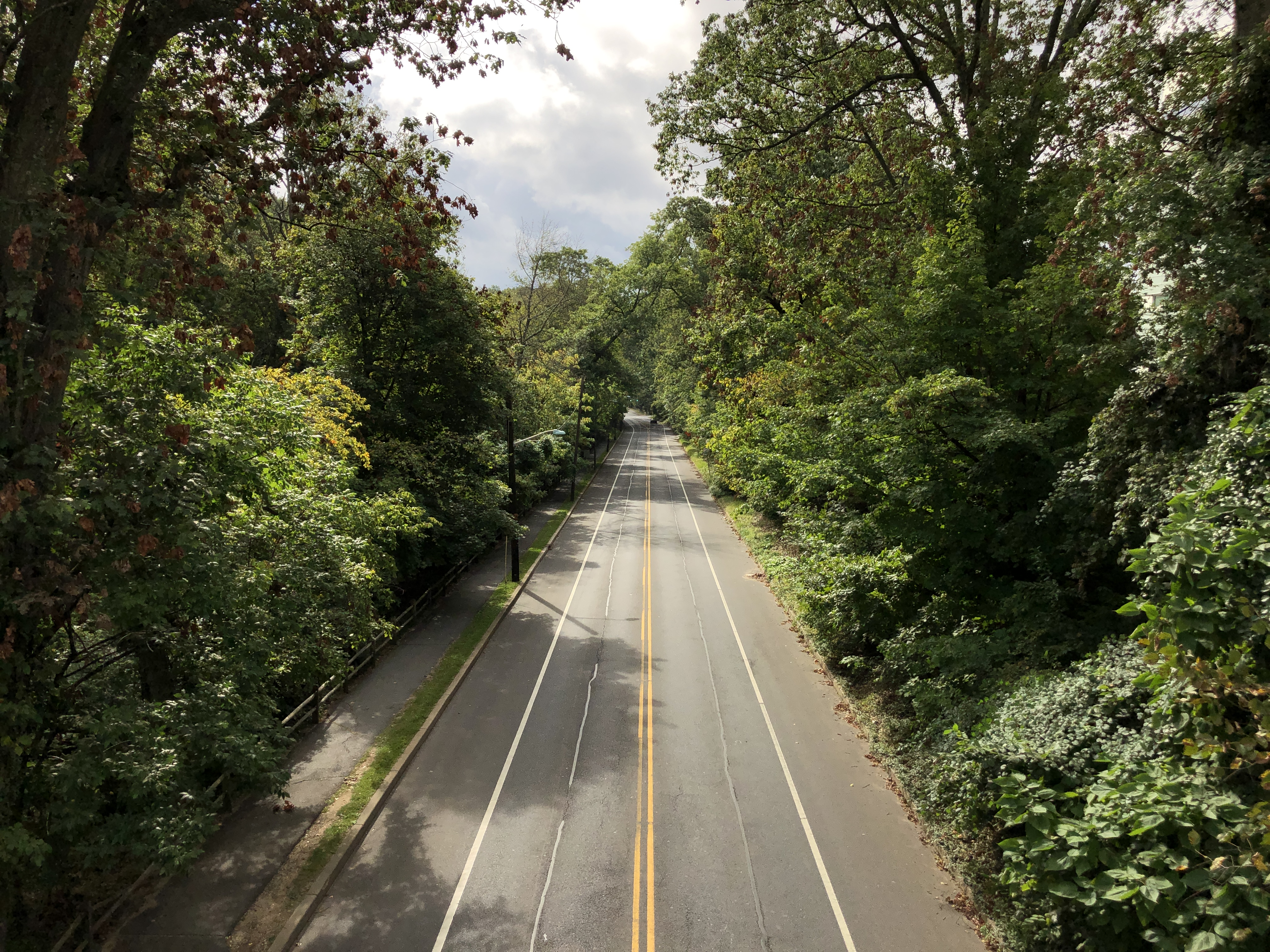
Washington Road, part of CR 571, from Streicker bridge as it passes through the campus of Princeton University

From Hightstown to Millstone Township, the road was built by the Hightstown and Perrineville Turnpike Company, chartered in 1859. Their road also extended east along what is now Perrineville Road.

When it was first designated in the early 1950s, CR 571 ran entirely in Ocean County from then-Dover Township to CR 526 in Jackson. The modern-day route north of there followed CR 526 to Carrs Tavern, CR 524 in Clarksburg, municipal and minor county routes in Monmouth and Mercer Counties, and from Hightstown to Princeton what was then designated CR 539. By 1962, the designation entered Monmouth County, and by 1976, CR 571 from Hightstown to Princeton was in-place.

In the summer of 2012, the New Jersey Department of Transportation]] installed barriers at the Penns Neck Circle to prevent "left-turning" traffic from US 1 in either direction onto CR 571. In conjunction with other blockades of nearby intersections, this 12-week pilot program was meant to improve traffic flows along the congested US 1. Though the project was improving travel times along US 1, motorists wanting to make the previously-allowed left turns were making U-turns and K-turns in the driveways of Penns Neck residences instead of using nearby interchanges to U-turn on US 1 itself. The project ended a month early after residents complaints and local politicians opposition to the project were heard. The New Jersey Department of Transportation has proposed a realignment of CR 571 in the Penns Neck neighborhood of West Windsor. The various alternatives would have begun near the northern terminus of Route 64 at a new grade-separated interchange to provide access to the Princeton Junction Station and the existing Washington Road, run north of Penns Neck through the David Sarnoff Research, cross US 1 at a new grade-separated interchange, and return to the existing alignment south of the Millstone River.

== Major intersections ==
County	Location	mi	km	Destinations	Notes
Ocean	Toms River	0.0	0.0	Route 37 – Seaside Hts, Toms River, Lakehurst CR 549 Spur begins	Southern terminus; southern terminus of CR 549 Spur
Ocean	Toms River	1.4	2.3	CR 549 Spur north (Fischer Blvd)	North end of the concurrency with CR 549 Spur
Ocean	Toms River	4.2	6.8	CR 549 (Hooper Ave)	At-grade cloverleaf
Ocean	Toms River	6.1	9.8	US 9 (Lakewood Rd) to G.S. Parkway / Route 166 – Toms River, Seaside Hts, Lakewood	
Ocean	Toms River	6.6	10.6	CR 527 south (Whitesville Rd)	Southern end of the concurrency with CR 527
Ocean	Toms River	7.4	11.9	CR 527 north (Whitesville Rd)	Northern end of the concurrency with CR 527
Ocean	Manchester Township	10.0	16.1	Route 70 – Lakehurst, Pt Pleasant	
Ocean	Manchester Township	12.1	19.5	CR 547 (S Hope Chapel Rd) – Lakehurst, Lakewood	Access to Joint Base MDL Lakehurst Gate
Ocean	Jackson Township	19.0	30.6	CR 528 (W Veterans Hwy) – Lakewood, New Egypt, Fort Dix	
Ocean	Jackson Township	22.8	36.7	CR 526 east (W Commodore Blvd)	Southern end of the concurrency with CR 526
Ocean–Monmouth county line	Jackson–Millstone township line	23.7	38.1	CR 537 (Monmouth Rd) to I-195 – Freehold, Mt. Holly	Access to CentraState Medical Center
Monmouth	Millstone Township	24.3	39.1	CR 526 west (Trenton-Lakewood Rd)	Northern end of the concurrency with CR 526
Monmouth	Millstone Township	25.6	41.2	CR 524 east (Stagecoach Rd) – Freehold, Perrineville	Southern end of the concurrency with CR 524
Monmouth	Millstone Township	26.73	43.02	CR 524 west (Stagecoach Rd) – Allentown	Northern end of the concurrency with CR 524
Mercer	Hightstown	33.9	54.6	CR 539 south (S Main St) – Allentown	Southern end of the concurrency with CR 539
Mercer	Hightstown	34.3	55.2	Route 33 west (Mercer St) – Trenton	Southern end of the concurrency with Route 33
Mercer	Hightstown	34.4	55.4	Route 33 east / CR 539 north (N Main St) to I-95 / N.J. Turnpike – Cranbury, Freehold	Northern end of the concurrency with Route 33/CR 539
Mercer	East Windsor	35.2	56.6	US 130 to I-95 / N.J. Turnpike – Camden, New Brunswick	
Mercer	East Windsor	36.5	58.7	Route 133 east to I-95 / N.J. Turnpike / Windsor Center Dr – Freehold	Western terminus of Route 133
Mercer	East Windsor	36.8	59.2	CR 535 (Old Trenton Rd) – Trenton, Cranbury	
Mercer	West Windsor	39.7	63.9	CR 526 east (S Mill Rd) – Edinburg, Robbinsville	Western terminus of CR 526
Mercer	West Windsor	40.8	65.7	CR 615 east (Cranbury Rd) – Grovers Mill, Cranbury Route 64 begins	Western terminus of CR 615; southern terminus of Route 64
Mercer	West Windsor	41.2	66.3	Route 64 ends	
Mercer	West Windsor	42.2	67.9	US 1 – Trenton, New Brunswick	Penns Neck Circle
Mercer	Princeton	43.9	70.7	Route 27 (Nassau St)	Northern terminus
1.000 mi = 1.609 km; 1.000 km = 0.621 mi: Concurrency terminus
