= Carrs Tavern, New Jersey =

Populated place in Monmouth County, New Jersey, US

- Unincorporated community
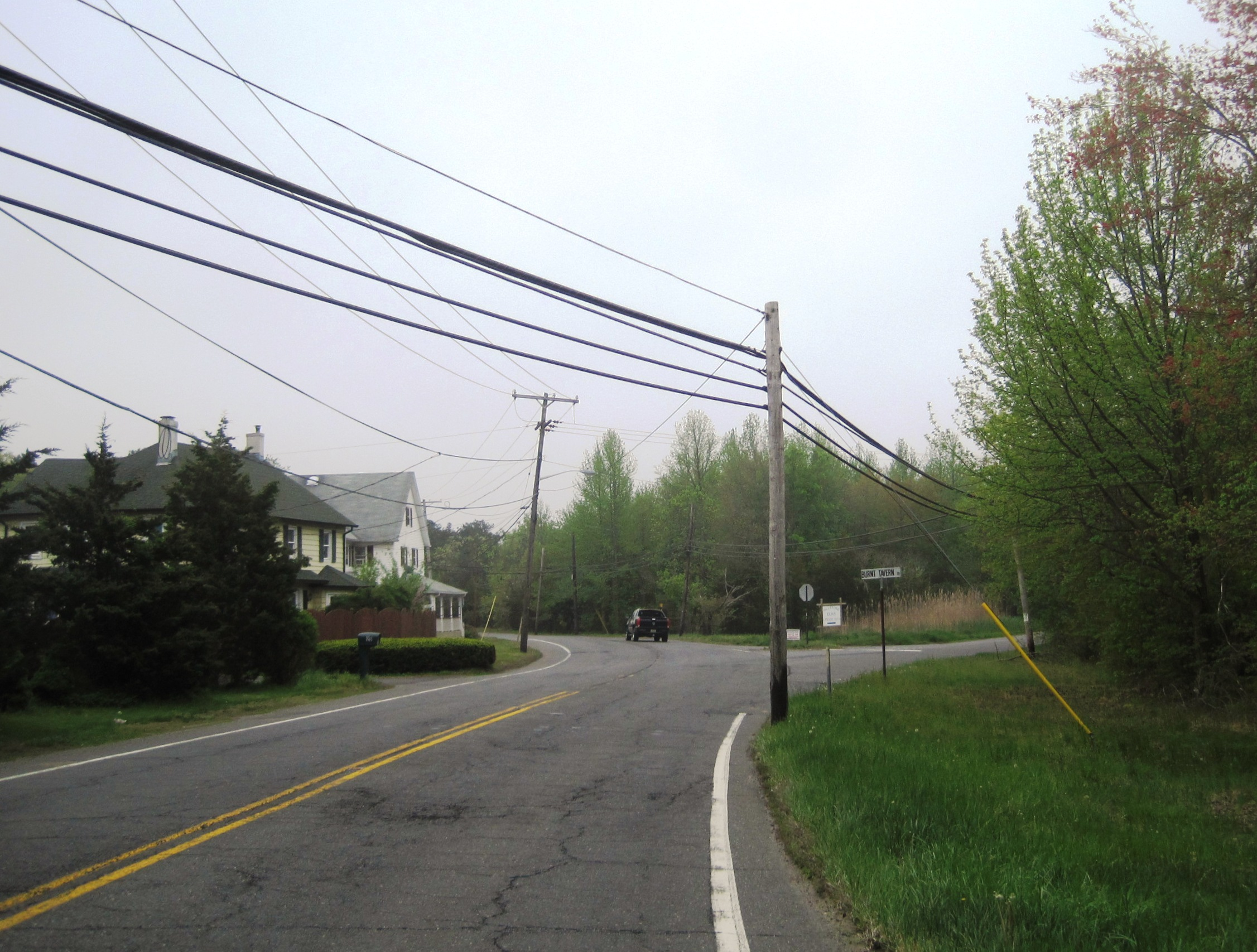
- CR 526 and 571 at Burnt Tavern Road

- Location in Monmouth County. Inset: Location of county within the state of New Jersey Carrs Tavern (New Jersey) Carrs Tavern (the United States)
- Coordinates: 40°10′17″N 74°25′18″W
- Country: United States
- State: New Jersey
- County: Monmouth
- Township: Millstone
- Elevation: 167 ft (51 m)
- GNIS feature ID: 875220

Carrs Tavern is an unincorporated community in Millstone Township in Monmouth County, in the U.S. state of New Jersey. It is located at the intersection of County Route 526 and County Route 571.

Author Caren Lissner wrote about the settlement in her essay A Rumble and a Scream: "I took Carrs Tavern Road (though I couldn't find the tavern)."
