= New Jersey Route 133 =

State highway in New Jersey, US

Route 133
- Hightstown Bypass
- Map of Route 133, which is highlighted in red.

Route information
- Auxiliary route of Route 33
- Maintained by NJDOT and NJTA
- Length: 4.06 mi (6.53 km)
- Existed: November 30, 1999–present

Major junctions
- West end: CR 571 / Windsor Center Drive in East Windsor
- US 130 in East Windsor; Route 33 in East Windsor
- East end: I-95 Toll / N.J. Turnpike in East Windsor

Location
- Country: United States
- State: New Jersey
- Counties: Mercer

Highway system
- New Jersey State Highway Routes; Interstate; US; State; Scenic Byways
← US 130	→ Route 138

Route 133 (also known as the Hightstown Bypass) is a 4.06-mile-long (6.53 km) freeway located entirely in East Windsor, Mercer County, New Jersey, in the United States. The route runs as a four-lane bypass around the north side of Hightstown, running from Princeton-Hightstown Road (County Route 571 [CR 571]) and Windsor Center Drive to the New Jersey Turnpike (Interstate 95 [I-95]) at exit 8. Originally, Route 133 did not have any direct connections to any other freeways until a new turnpike interchange opened in January 2013.

The plans for the original bypass of Hightstown originated in 1929, when locals looked for a way to remove traffic from downtown. The New Jersey State Legislature followed up in 1938 by designating a new spur off of State Highway Route 31 (then part of U.S. Route 206 [US 206]), State Highway Route 31A as a freeway from Princeton to the Jersey Shore. During the 1970s, the highway proposed as Route 92 gained momentum, running from Princeton (at I-95's proposed Somerset Freeway) all the way to Route 33 at Hightstown. However, after several setbacks, Route 92 was moved northward in 1988 and the bypass was truncated to a short portion of highway bypassing Hightstown. Construction on the new $57 million Route 133 commenced on September 20, 1996, and was completed and opened on November 30, 1999.

== Route description ==
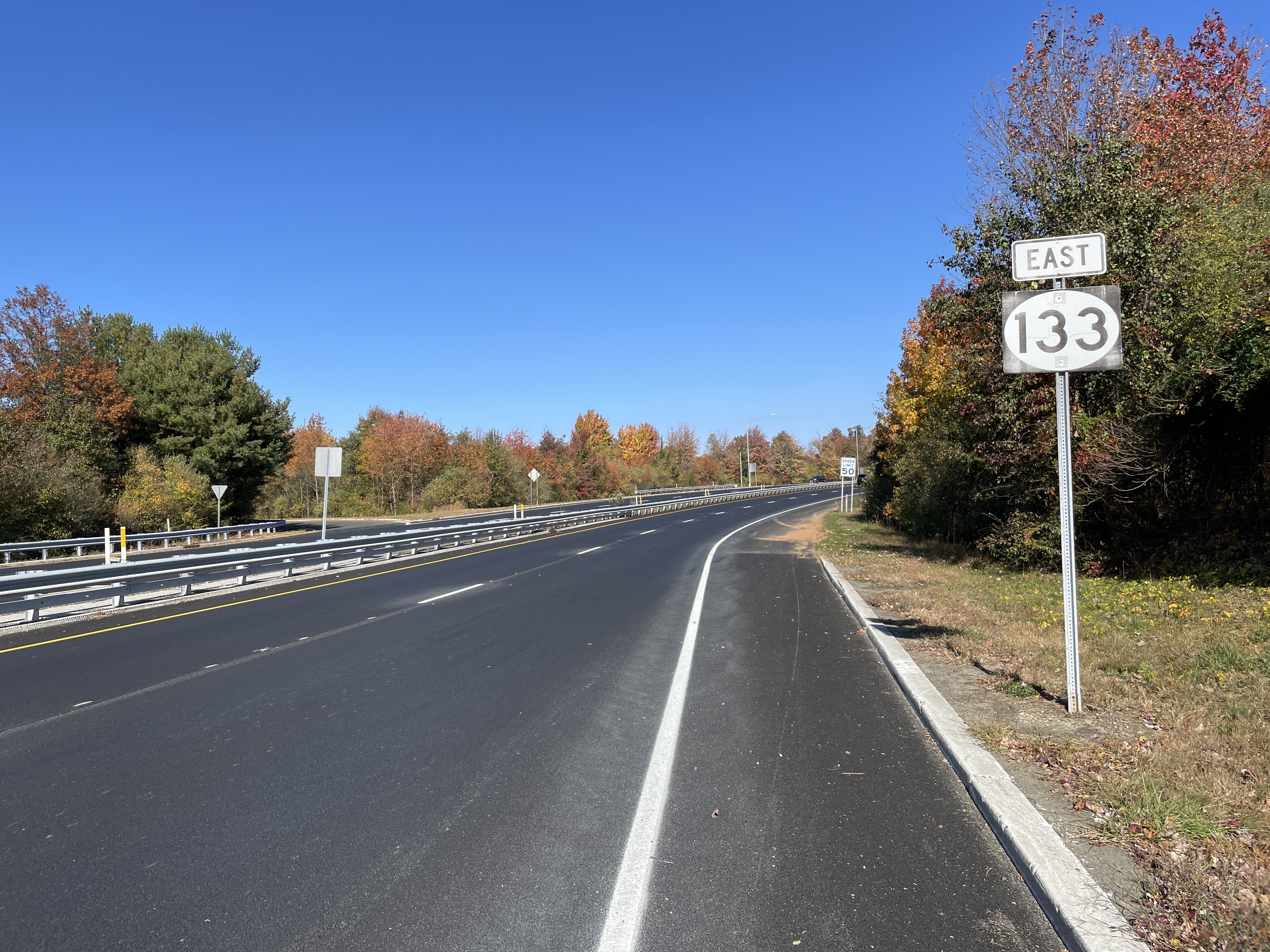
Route 133 eastbound past western terminus at CR 571 in East Windsor Township

Route 133 begins at an at-grade intersection with Princeton-Hightstown Road (CR 571) and Windsor Center Drive in East Windsor. The intersection includes a jughandle for eastbound traffic to use to access the highway. After the jughandle allowing westbound CR 571 traffic to access Windsor Center Drive which continues southwest from the freeway, Route 133 begins to progress its way northward as a four-lane freeway, crossing through surroundings of trees and open fields. Along a large bend, the highway turns eastward, paralleling to CR 571 to the south and Old Trenton Road (CR 535) to the north. Passing to the southeast of a McGraw Hill Financial office building, Route 133 curves to the southeast through fields and crosses over the locally maintained One Mile Road heading eastbound and interchanges westbound. Heading eastbound, the on-ramp to Route 133 from One Mile Road merges in, and the highway continues, passing to the north of homes and commercial buildings through East Windsor.

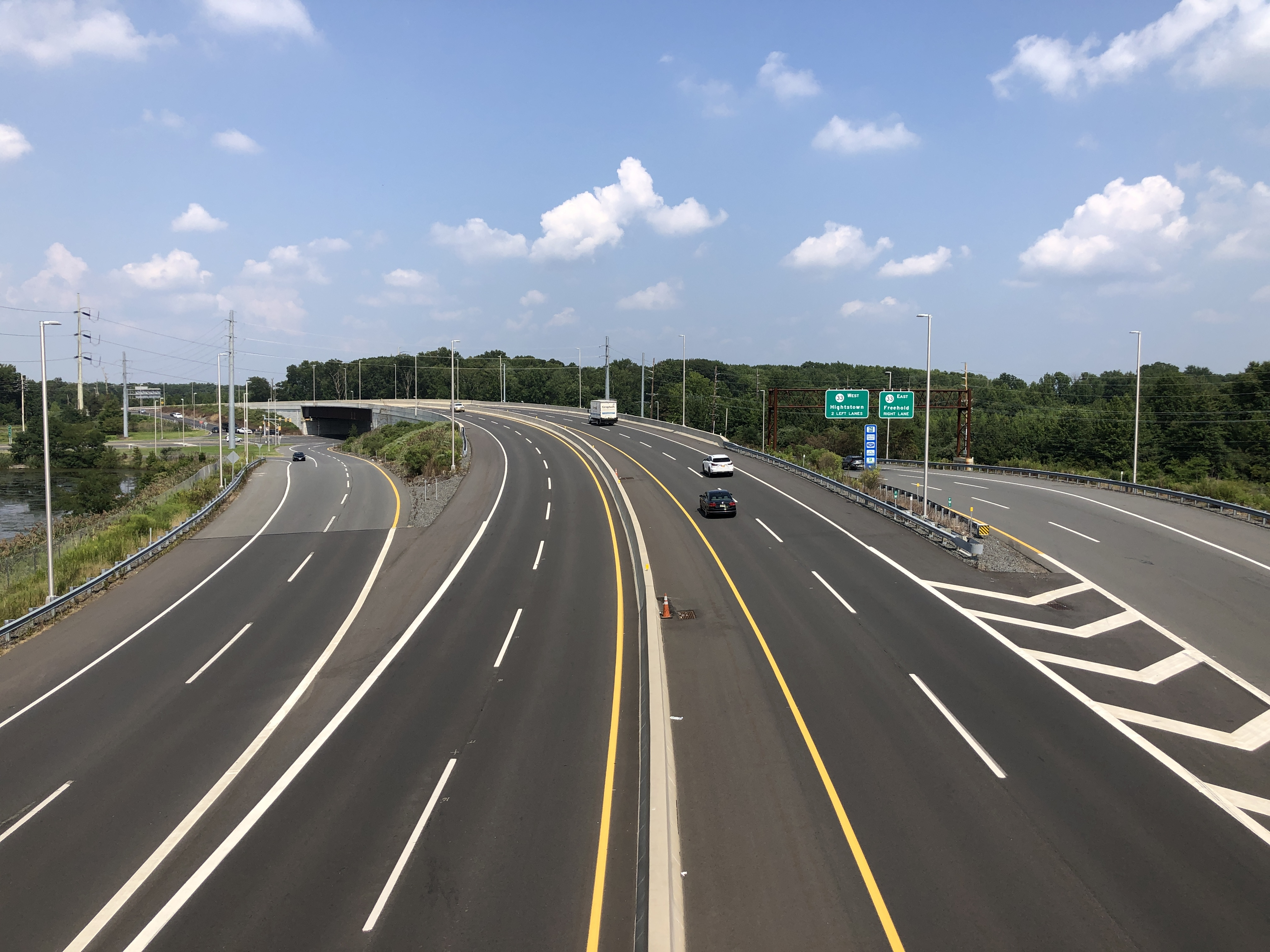
Route 133 westbound at interchange with Route 33 in East Windsor Township

A short distance later, Route 133 crosses over Rocky Brook. The highway's surroundings then change drastically, with residential homes surrounding the freeway in each direction (though blocked from view by trees and noise barriers). A short distance later, Route 133 crosses over US 130 with a cloverleaf interchange with some movements missing. After US 130, the highway continues eastward, crossing over North Main Street (CR 539). The highway crosses the right-of-way of the historic Camden and Amboy Railroad; there is no bridge over the trackbed that is abandoned only a short few feet to the north and a few miles south around the Hightstown area. Route 133 turns to the southeast once again, continuing to the south of a condominium complex. Leaving the condos behind, the highway turns southward through lands and runs parallel to the south of Cranbury Station Road. Route 133 continues southward, crossing over Wyckoff Mills Road, which serves as the southern terminus of Cranbury Station Road. As the road parallels Wyckoff Mills Road, the four-lane freeway continues eastward, crossing over the 12 lanes of the New Jersey Turnpike (I-95). (The Route 133 bridge over the turnpike was built with provisions for the New Jersey Turnpike to be widened with additional sets of three lanes in each direction, which was completed in November 2014.) To the south of Wyckoff Mills Road, Route 133 continues as a four-lane freeway. Soon after, Route 133 turns southward, heading away from Wyckoff Mills Road and reaches a single-point urban interchange with Route 33. The mainline of Route 133 becomes the jurisdiction of the New Jersey Turnpike Authority as it passes over Route 33 and heads underneath Milford Road before ending at the toll plaza for exit 8 of the turnpike. The roadway past the toll plaza becomes part of the trumpet interchange for the turnpike.

== History ==
=== Route 92, the original proposal ===
Route 133 was going to be part of Route 92 until the 1990s

The original concept for a bypass of Hightstown dates back to 1929, when local members of community requested a solution to relieve traffic on current-day CR 571 away from the downtown. However, nothing was ever produced, until 1938, when the New Jersey State Legislature designated State Highway Route 31A, a modern expressway crossing from the borough of Princeton eastward to Hightstown and further to the Atlantic Ocean along current-day Route 33. In 1950, Governor Alfred E. Driscoll promoted the statewide expressway, citing that "it is unwise to expect city streets to bear the brunt of through, truck and passenger traffic." However, State Highway Route 31A was truncated in the 1953 state highway renumbering to a short portion of highway in West Windsor as Route 64.

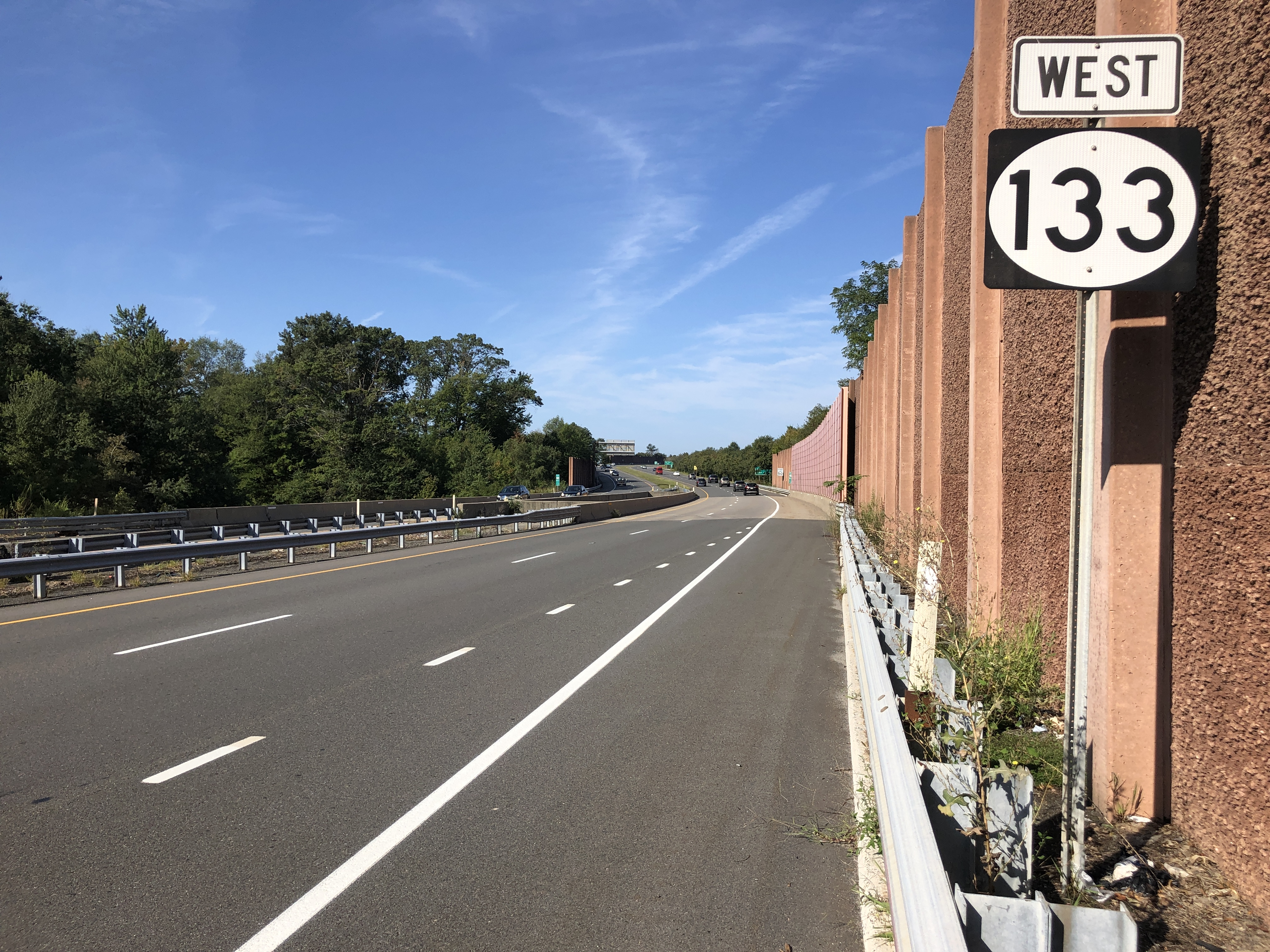
View west along Route 133 just west of US 130 in East Windsor Township

During the 1950s, the New Jersey State Highway Department released plans to construct the Princeton–Hightstown Bypass, a 14-mile-long (23 km), four-lane freeway connecting US 206 in the Montgomery Township community of Skillman to Route 33 in East Windsor. The freeway, designated as Route 92, was to connect US 206 with Route 27, US 1, and US 130, Route 33 and the New Jersey Turnpike. While the eastern terminus was to be at the New Jersey Turnpike, the western terminus of Route 92 was to be at an interchange with the Somerset Freeway (I-95) near Rocky Hill. Although plans for Route 92 remained, the Somerset Freeway proposal was decommissioned in 1982, leaving open funds for use on other projects. The New Jersey Department of Transportation suggested serving funds to the Route 92 project along with five other transportation projects. The project was working on its final studies and proposals in 1986, which was the year new interstates could be proposed to the Federal Highway Administration, however, the portion west of US 1 was dropped from the plans a year later.

=== The down-scaled route ===
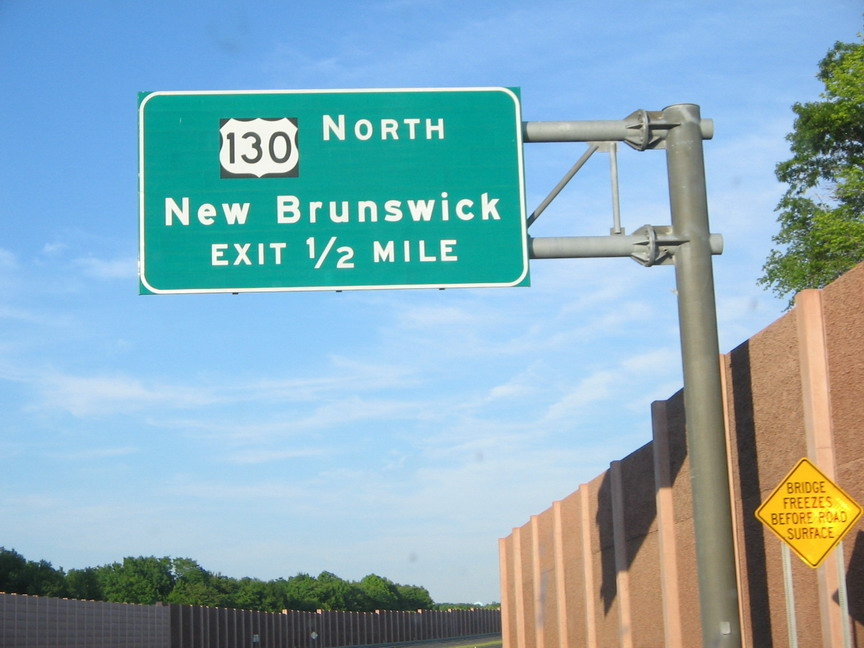
Signage for the interchange with US 130 in East Windsor Township. Although Route 133 is a freeway, none of its interchanges have exit numbers.

After Route 92 was shifted northward by the New Jersey Department of Transportation (NJDOT) due to the belief that it would better serve residents further north, the proposal went into shadows. In 1994, six years after plans changed for the Route 92 Freeway, NJDOT revived the plans, attempting to build the freeway from Princeton to Hightstown. However, the next year, the plan had to be altered due to public opposition from the communities of Princeton and Plainsboro. This plan was to construct a 3.8-mile (6.1 km) bypass of Hightstown and East Windsor, now designated as Route 133. The bid for the construction of the new four-lane freeway was accepted from the Schiavone Construction Company in 1996 for a cost of $57 million (equivalent to $105 million in 2024). Design began that June and construction of the new freeway started on September 20. The project was constructed as New Jersey's first modified-design–build freeway, which helped save money and costs for construction, reducing 26 months off the average construction time for the style of freeway. On November 30, 1999, the roadway, which was completed, was opened to commuter traffic, over a year later than originally estimated (July 1998). Part of this delay was due to passage of Hurricane Floyd over the region during September 1999, whose heavy rains resulted in substantial erosion at the project site. At the time of the opening, the freeway carried a 45-mile-per-hour (72 km/h) speed limit; this was increased to 50 miles per hour (80 km/h) in August 2001.

=== Extension to the New Jersey Turnpike ===
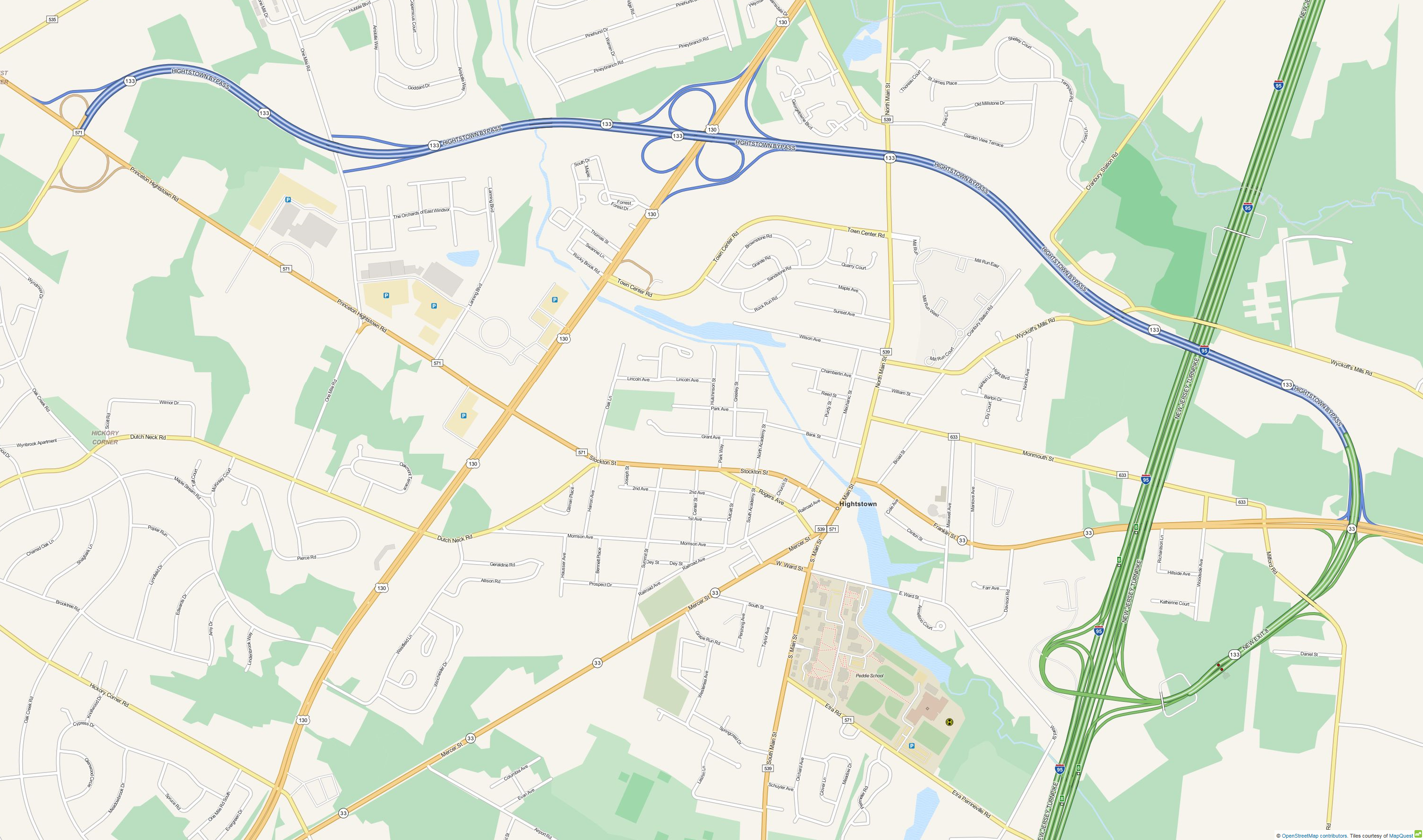
Entire length of Route 133 with the new turnpike interchange

On December 31, 2006, the New Jersey Turnpike Authority (NJTA) released its proposals regarding exit 8 of the New Jersey Turnpike and its possible replacement. As part of a project to widen the turnpike between exits 6 and 8A, the existing exit 8 would be demolished and replaced with a new interchange. The new interchange would end at the intersection with Route 33, Milford Road, and the Route 133 bypass (on the east side of the turnpike, instead of the west). This new exit 8 would grant direct access to the bypass (without going through any traffic lights), as well as to Route 33, using grade-separated interchanges. The new toll gate would feature a total of 12 booths at the toll gate. The second option would be a grade-separated diamond interchange, which would lead the ramps towards Route 33. At the intersection with Route 33 and the interchange ramps (from the turnpike and Route 133), a traffic signal would be built underneath the exit 8 ramps/Route 133. In lieu of a connector road, a jughandle would be built on Route 33 west. This would intersect at Route 33 (with a traffic light) and become the relocated Milford Road (after crossing Route 33).

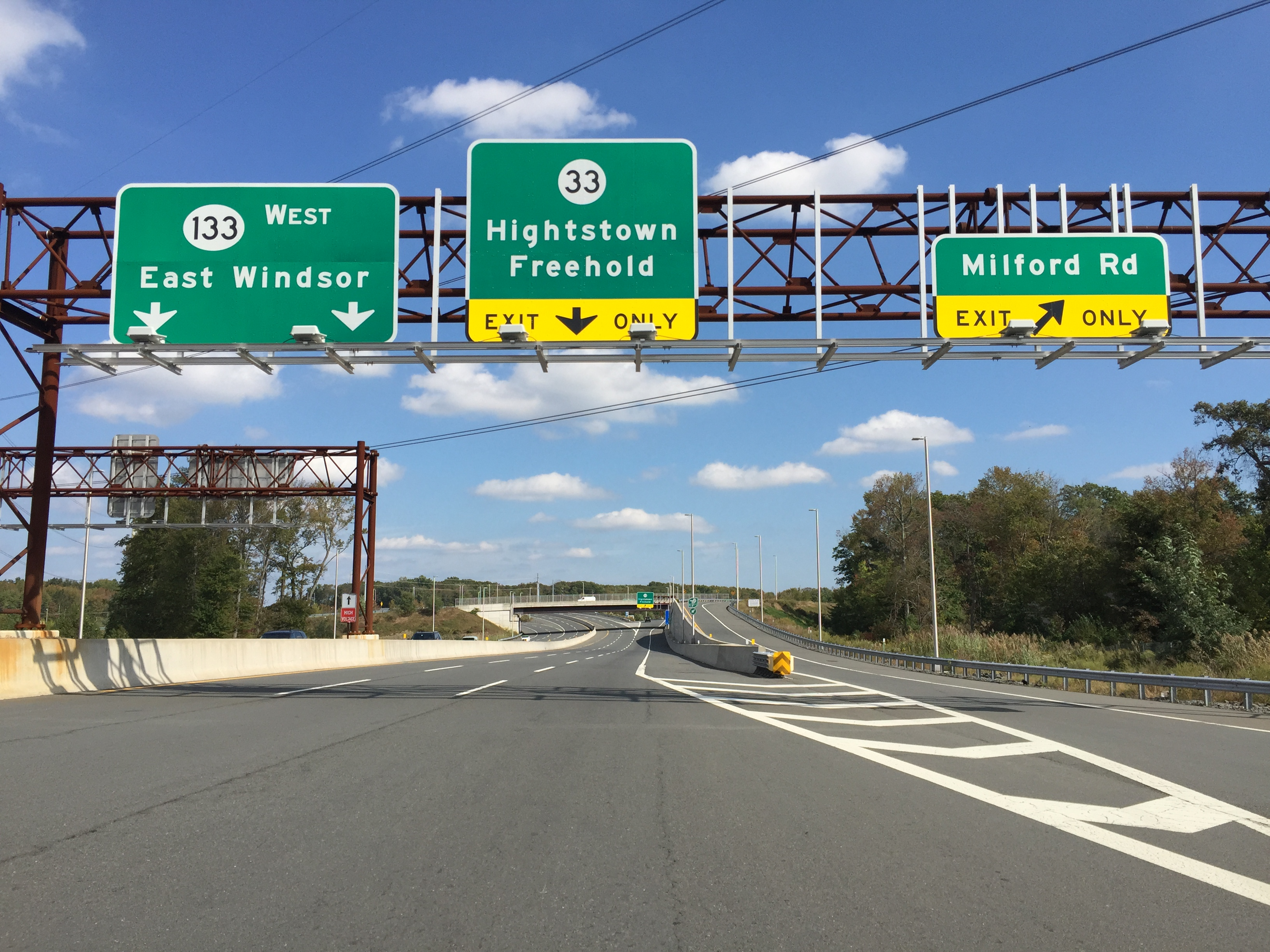
Route 133 heading westbound from the eastern terminus at I-95/NJ Turnpike in East Windsor Township

The third option was an unusual cloverleaf interchange would be built in lieu of a diamond interchange. After exiting the turnpike from the toll gate, a ramp on the right would lead to Milford Road or Route 33. The mainline of the turnpike ramp would cross over Route 33 and turn into Route 133. A relocated Milford Road would be built across from Monmouth Street (CR 633) and Route 33 (without connecting Monmouth Street and Milford Road) towards the intersection with the current Milford Road and Daniel Street. The new Milford would cross over the turnpike ramps. A leaf would be built from the turnpike ramp approaching the exit 8 toll gate, which would connect to Milford Road. An entrance ramp would be constructed from Milford Road to the exit 8 toll gate. Traveling north on Milford Road, a ramp would be constructed, which would diverge into two ways; one way would merge into the turnpike ramp heading towards Route 133, and the other would intersect at a new traffic light at Route 33, 0.1 miles (0.16 km) east of the current Route 33/Route 133/Milford Road intersection.

Ultimately, the NJTA chose the first option for the interchange. But the connector road was eliminated and an exit ramp from the new tollgate to Milford Road south was added to the proposal.

The new exit 8 interchange and toll plaza partially opened in January 2013 with a combination of some temporary and some permanent ramps connecting to the turnpike, at which point the old interchange was closed, though the old interchange remains in use to access a maintenance depot. The new overpass crossing over Route 33 was opened in September 2013, followed by completion of the interchange by 2014.

== Exit list ==
The entire route is in East Windsor, Mercer County. All exits are unnumbered.

mi	km	Destinations	Notes
0.00	0.00	CR 571 (Princeton-Hightstown Road) / Windsor Center Drive – Princeton, Hightstown	Western terminus; at-grade intersection
0.72	1.16	One Mile Road	Westbound exit and eastbound entrance
1.61	2.59	US 130 – New Brunswick, Bordentown	No eastbound access to US 130 south
3.59	5.78	Route 33 / Milford Road – East Windsor, Hightstown, Twin Rivers, Freehold	Single-point urban interchange; last eastbound exit before toll
4.06	6.53	Exit 8 Toll Plaza	
4.06	6.53	I-95 Toll / N.J. Turnpike – Trenton, New York City	Eastern terminus; exit 8 on I-95 / N.J. Turnpike
1.000 mi = 1.609 km; 1.000 km = 0.621 mi: Incomplete access; Tolled

== See also ==
- CR 522, a four-lane road from US 130 west to US 1 in the same general corridor as Route 92
