= A65 =

A65 or A-65 may refer to:

- A65 road (England), a major road in England
- A65 motorway (France), a major road in France
- A65 motorway (Germany), a road connecting Kandel and Wörth am Rhein
- A65 motorway (Netherlands)
- A65 motorway (Spain)
- Benoni Defense, in the Encyclopaedia of Chess Openings
- BSA A65 Rocket, a motorcycle made by BSA
