= Opossum Creek (Little Osage River tributary) =

Stream in Missouri, US

Coordinates: 37°59′52″N 94°52′53″W

Opossum Creek (also known as Possum Branch) is a stream in Bourbon and Linn counties, in the U.S. state of Kansas. It is a tributary of the Little Osage River.

Opossum Creek was named for the great number of opossums trapped there by first settlers.

== See also ==
- List of rivers of Kansas
