= Virginia State Route 64 =

The following highways in Virginia have been known as State Route 64:

- State Route 64 (Virginia 1933-1940), Tennessee to Lebanon, Virginia
- State Route 64 (Virginia 1940-1958), now part of State Route 63
- Interstate 64 in Virginia, 1957–present
