= New Jersey Route 64 =

State highway in Mercer County, New Jersey, US

Route 64

Route information
- Maintained by New Jersey Department of Transportation
- Length: 0.32 mi (510 m)
- Existed: 1953 (Constructed in 1939)–present

Major junctions
- South end: CR 571 / CR 615 in West Windsor
- North end: CR 571 in West Windsor

Location
- Country: United States
- State: New Jersey
- Counties: Mercer

Highway system
- New Jersey State Highway Routes; Interstate; US; State; Scenic Byways
← Route 63	→ Route 65

Route 64 is a 0.32-mile-long (0.51 km) state highway in the U.S. state of New Jersey. It is a state-maintained bridge over Amtrak's Northeast Corridor line in West Windsor. Route 64 begins at an intersection with County Route 571 in West Windsor. It heads along the bridge to an intersection with County Route 615, where Route 64 ends. County Route 571, which is concurrent with Route 64, continues to Hightstown.

Route 64 was designated originally as an alignment of Route 31A, a spur off of State Highway Route 31 (currently U.S. Route 206) from Princeton eastward to Hightstown, where it met State Highway Route 33. The state planned on turning the alignment into a full-fledged expressway for several decades, including constructing the alignment that Route 64 currently uses in 1939. The route was amended in 1941, and was renumbered from Route 31A to Route 64 in the 1953 renumbering. Route 64 was proposed to become part of the Princeton–Hightstown Bypass (later designated Route 92), but completion never occurred. Currently, the route remains the bridge over the Northeast Corridor. However, it is not currently planned that Route 64 will receive an extension of sorts from the proposed Penns Neck Bypass to U.S. Route 1, a proposed realignment of County Route 571.

== Route description ==
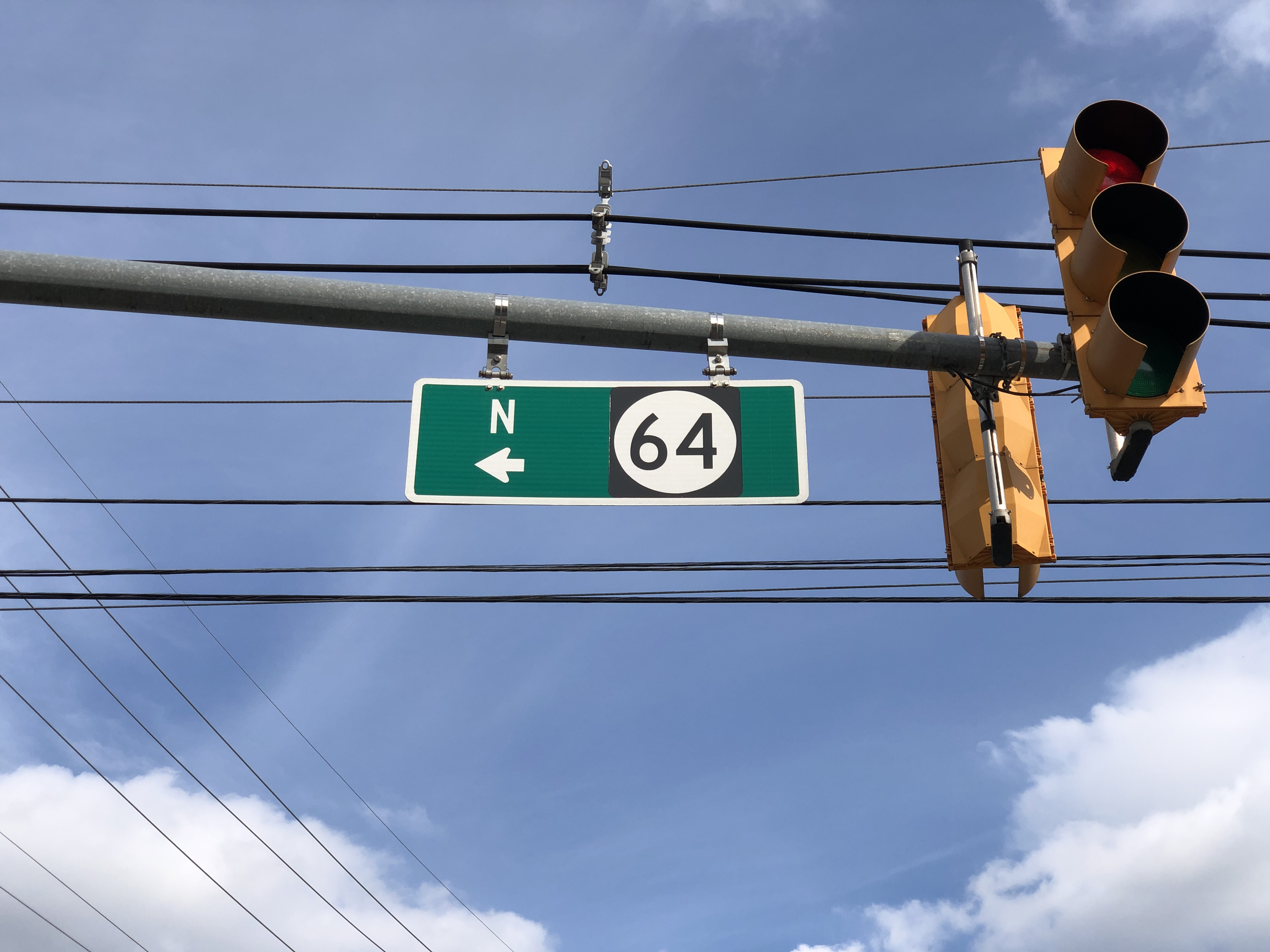
The only Route 64 signage is this blade on the traffic light at its southern terminus

Route 64 begins at an intersection with County Route 571 and County Route 615 in the community of West Windsor. From this point, County Route 571 continues along the right-of-way towards U.S. Route 130. The route heads north and crosses over Amtrak's Northeast Corridor railroad line before it passes to the north of a local bus depot. Route 64 continues westward for a short distance, crossing through a local woodland and behind several local homes. The route makes a gradual curve to the west off the railroad bridge and passes behind a couple of homes before heading to the south slightly at an intersection. Route 64 reaches its northern terminus and County Route 571 makes a right turn to head northwest toward U.S. Route 1 and Princeton.

== History ==
=== Route 31A and the original freeway ===
Route 31A
- Location: West Windsor
- Existed: 1938–1953

In the late-1920s, the state proposed a bypass along the alignment. In 1938, the New Jersey State Highway Department and New Jersey General Assembly put forth a proposal detailing that a highway from State Highway Route 31 (co-signed with U.S. Route 206) in the city of Princeton eastward through Mercer County onto current-day County Route 571. From there, it would follow an alignment of highway to the intersection with State Highway Route 33 in the community of Hightstown. The original proposal for the highway was to turn the road into a limited-access freeway along its entirety. The route was designated as State Highway Route 31A, a suffixed spur of State Highway Route 31 that year. A portion of the highway was constructed in 1939, when a bridge over the Pennsylvania Railroad was constructed from Washington Road's former alignment to the current intersection with Route 615. This new, 104.00-foot-long (31.70 m) bridge replaced the at-grade crossing on Washington Road, which is now a dead-end. The state highway law was amended just three years later, with the freeway option removed and the extensions remaining.

The new bridge remained in place along Route 31A, however, no new portions of the freeway were constructed in terms of creating the Route 31A Freeway, as proposed in 1938. In 1950, then-governor of New Jersey, Alfred E. Driscoll, cited the need for the expressway as an important truck and passenger car highway from Trenton to the Jersey Shore. Route 31A itself was decommissioned in the 1953 New Jersey state highway renumbering, and replaced by the designation of Route 64. The route was truncated from both ends toward Princeton and Hightstown, leaving just the bridge in West Windsor. Route 31A remained in the state highway statutes for several decades after decommissioning, with a bill in 1991 being proposed. The bill passed, and Route 31A was stripped from the statutes on January 18, 1992.

=== Route 92 and future changes to CR 571 ===
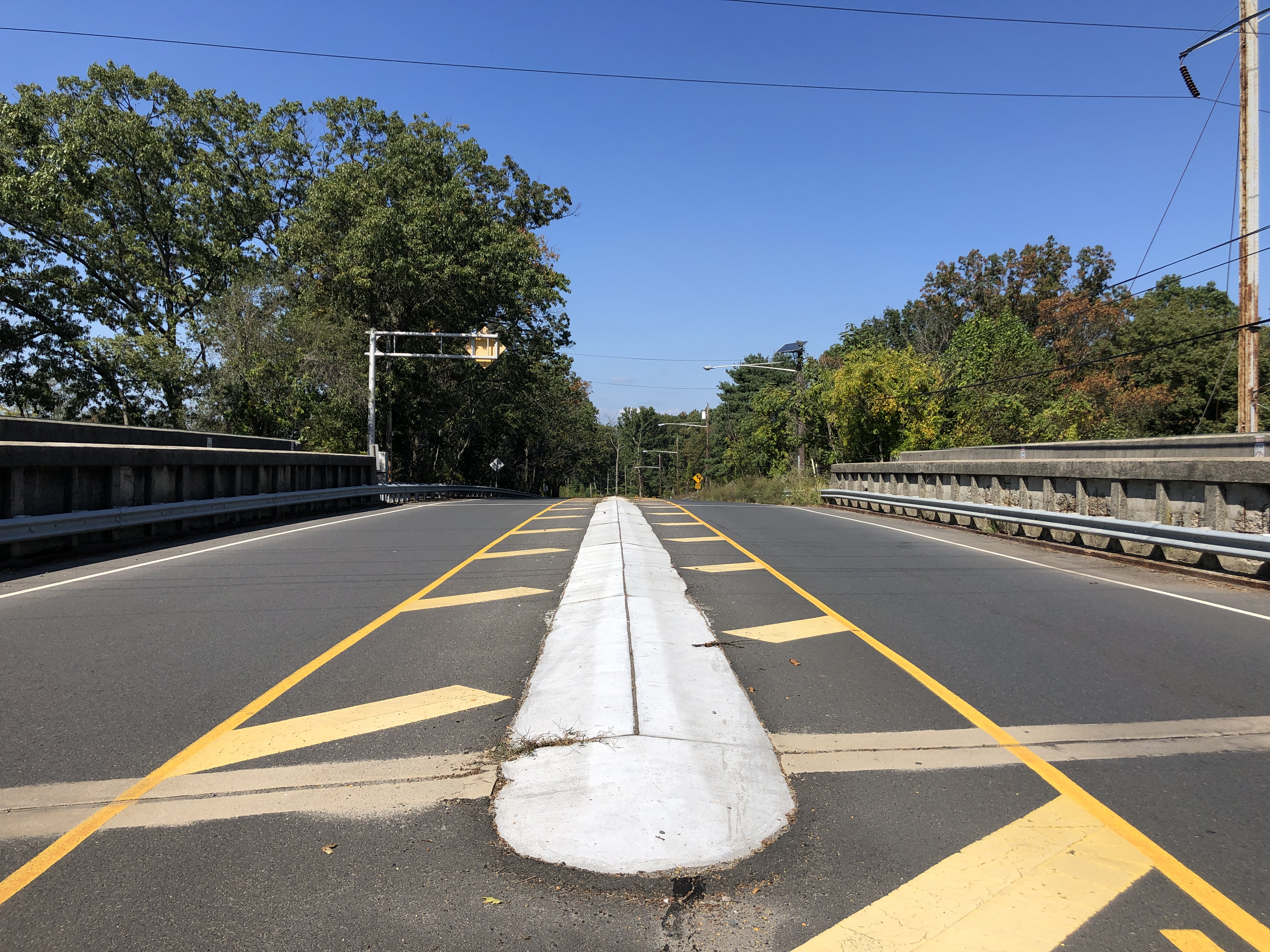
Route 64 northbound passing over the Northeast Corridor

Route 64, after designation in 1953, remained a short bridge along the highway. However, the need for an expressway from Trenton to the Jersey Shore remained, and in the late 1950s, the State Highway Department brought about plans for the Princeton–Hightstown Bypass, a four-lane freeway that would head for 14 miles (23 km) from U.S. Route 206 in Montgomery Township to New Jersey Route 33 in Hightstown. In the length, the freeway was to interchange with U.S. Route 1, U.S. Route 130 and New Jersey Route 27. The route was re-designated as Route 92, and remained a high priority project for several decades. Even after changes in alignment, Route 64 was still an alternative. However, Route 92 was shelved on December 1, 2006 in favor of widening the New Jersey Turnpike mainline, and only New Jersey Route 133 was constructed for the proposal.

As part of the proposed Penns Neck Bypass on U.S. Route 1, the New Jersey Department of Transportation plans on realigning County Route 571 from the western terminus of Route 64 to a northerly route to Route 1. Although County Route 571 are proposed to be realigned onto the new alignment, there is no designated change proposed for Route 64. On the contrary to this, one state figure shows Route 64 running along Washington Road, where the two county routes currently run.

== Major intersections ==
The entire route is in West Windsor, Mercer County.

mi	km	Destinations	Notes
0.00	0.00	CR 571 south (Hightstown Road) / CR 615 east (Cranbury Road) – Hightstown, Grovers Mill, Cranbury	Southern terminus; southern end of CR 571 concurrency; western terminus of CR 615
0.32	0.51	CR 571 north (Washington Road)	Continuation north; northern end of CR 571 concurrency
1.000 mi = 1.609 km; 1.000 km = 0.621 mi: Concurrency terminus

== See also ==
- New Jersey Route 13
- New Jersey Route 162
