= Horton, Vernon County, Missouri =

Unincorporated community in the US state of Missouri

Coordinates: 37.9745°N 94.3678°W

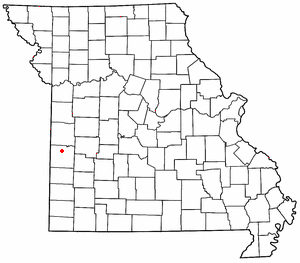

Horton is an unincorporated community in northern Vernon County, Missouri, United States. It is located on U.S. 71, approximately eight miles north of Nevada.

== History ==
Horton most likely had its start when the railroad was extended to that point. The community was named in 1890, most likely after a railroad man. A post office was established at Horton in 1891, and remained in operation until 1996.
