= Little Osage River =

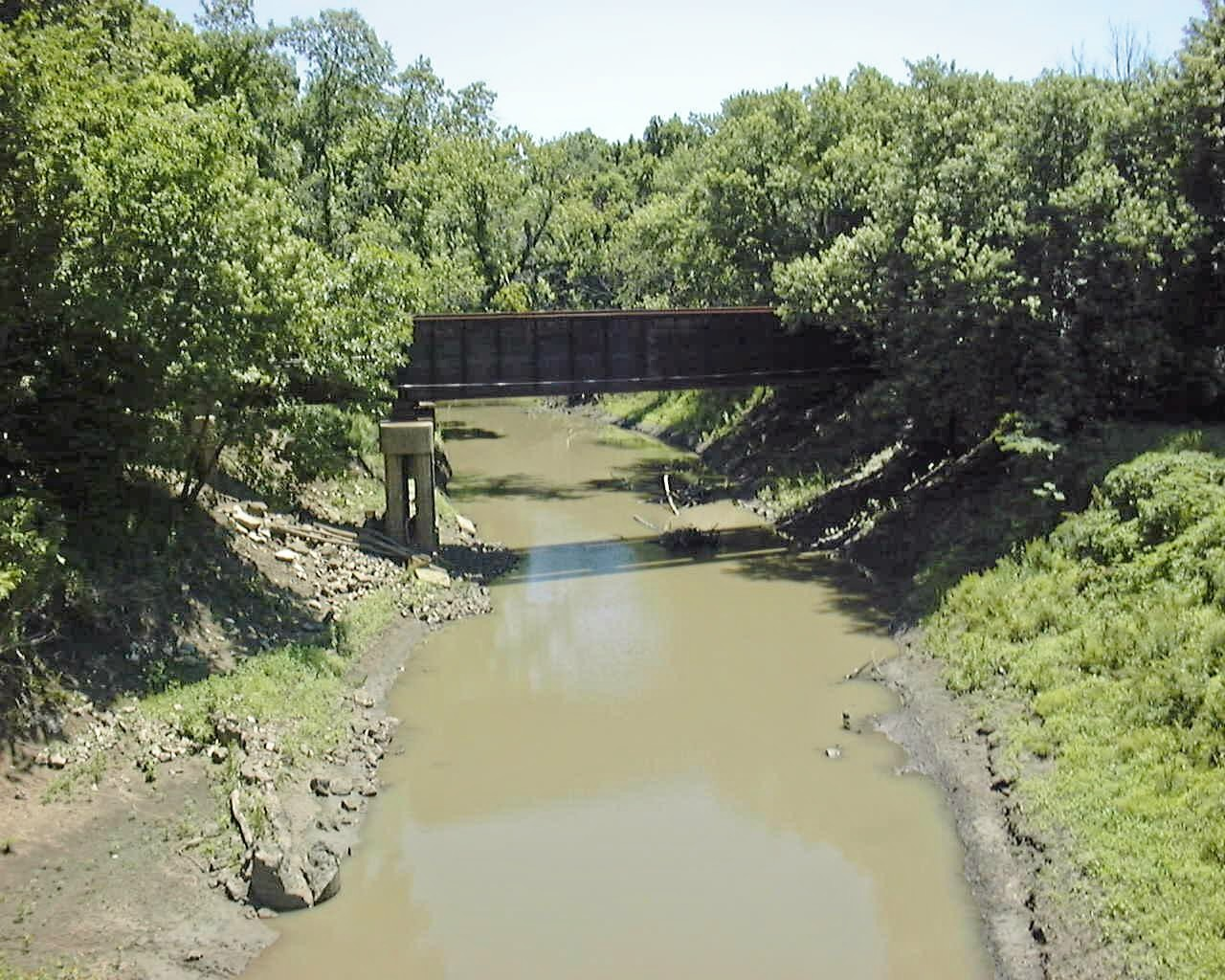
- The Little Osage River near Horton, Missouri

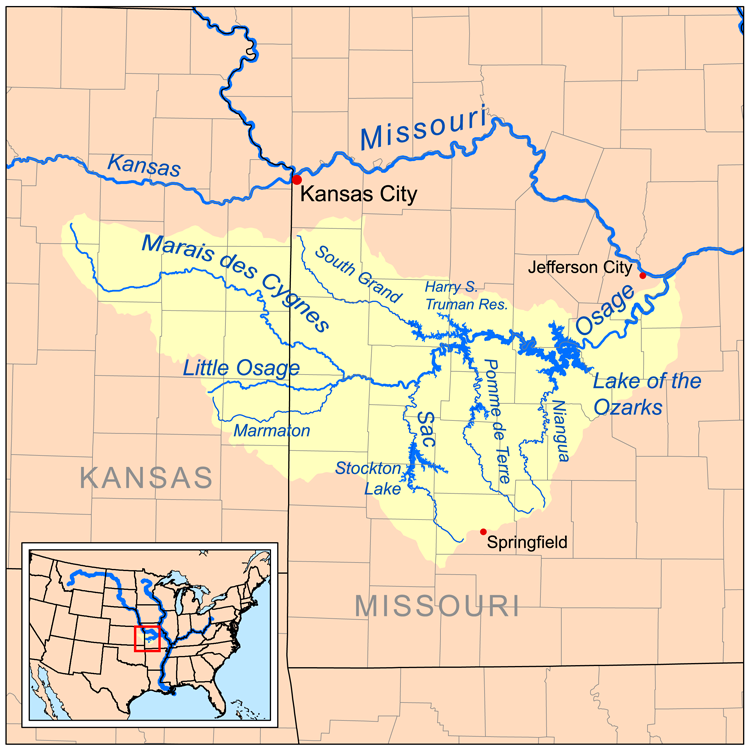
- Map of the Osage River watershed showing the Little Osage River

Location
- Country: United States
- State: Kansas, Missouri

Physical characteristics
- Source confluence
  - location: Allen County, Kansas
  - coordinates: 38°01′32″N 95°05′23″W
  - elevation: 943 ft (287 m)
- Mouth: Osage River
  - location: Vernon County, Missouri
  - coordinates: 38°01′39″N 94°14′39″W
  - elevation: 722 ft (220 m)
- Length: 88 mi (142 km)
- Discharge
  - location: USGS 0691700 at Horton, Missouri
  - average: 369 cu ft/s (10.4 m^{3}/s)
  - minimum: 0 cu ft/s (0 m^{3}/s)
  - maximum: 43,700 cu ft/s (1,240 m^{3}/s)

Basin features
- Tributaries
  - right: Limestone Creek, Marmaton River
- Watersheds: Little Osage-Osage-Missouri-Mississippi

The Little Osage River is an 88-mile-long (142 km) tributary of the Osage River in eastern Kansas and western Missouri in the United States. Via the Osage and Missouri rivers, it is part of the watershed of the Mississippi River.

The name was derived from the Osage Nation, whose traditional territory encompassed this area.

== Course ==
The Little Osage rises in Kansas in northeastern Allen County at the confluence of the North and Middle Forks. The stream flows southeast into Bourbon County where the South Fork joins the stream and the stream turns and flows to the east. The stream turns sharply south. It is crossed by Kansas 65 to the east of Xenia. The stream meanders eastward passing north of Fulton, and under U.S. Route 69, where it enters northwestern Vernon County, Missouri. In Vernon County the stream passes just north of Stotesbury and on to pass under U.S. Route 71 north of Horton and through the Four Rivers Conservation Area and is joined by the Marmaton River.

On the boundary of Vernon and Bates counties, the Little Osage joins the Marais des Cygnes River to form the Osage River, 6 miles (10 km) west of Schell City. The areas to the east of the Marmaton River confluence are within what is now the flooded area of the Harry S Truman Reservoir.

== See also ==
- List of Kansas rivers
- List of Missouri rivers
