= A64 (emulator) =

A64 is a Commodore 64 emulator for the Amiga. It was developed and published by QuesTronix and distributed as shareware. The non-registered is limited to ten minutes of use at a time. The registered version removes the time limit and comes with a hardware adapter to connect a Commodore 1541 disk drive to the Amiga's parallel port.

A64 has some extras that a real Commodore 64 is inherently unable to provide. The most useful of these is an integrated MOS 6510 machine language monitor, which can be invoked at any time during the emulation. While in the monitor, the emulated Commodore 64 is frozen in place, giving the user full reign over its internal memory and registers. The emulator also allows machine language program input through 6510 mnemonic codes, rather than raw numeric values. Another extra feature is that the 16-colour palette of the Commodore 64 is fully customisable from the Amiga's palette of 4096 hues.

A64 supports Commodore 64 disk drives as the devices 8 through 11, just like a real Commodore 64. These drives can be either simulated, mapped onto directories on the Amiga's filesystem, or real 1541-compatible drives accessed through the hardware adapter. A64 does not support the Commodore Datasette.
