= Limestone Creek (Kansas) =

Stream in the US state of Kansas

Coordinates: 37.987534°N 94.958025°W

Limestone Creek is a stream in Bourbon and Allen counties, in the U.S. state of Kansas.

The creek was named from the limestone outcroppings along this stream.

Limestone Creek enters the Little Osage River southeast of Xenia, in Bourbon County.

== See also ==
- List of rivers of Kansas
