= Autovía A-65 =

Road in Spain

Autovía A-65
- Autovía de Tierra de Campos

Route information
- Length: 11.20 km (6.96 mi)

Major junctions
- From: Palencia
- To: Grijota

Location
- Country: Spain
- Autonomous community: Castile and Leon
- Province: Palencia

Highway system
- Highways in Spain; Autopistas and autovías; National Roads

The Autovía A-65 is a proposed upgrade of the N-610 road in Spain. If completed, it would link Benavente with Palencia, both in Castille and León. Of a proposed length of 84 kilometres (52 mi), only a short section near Palencia has been built. The existing section serves as the northern ring road of Palencia, and as of 2021 there were no plans to complete the road.
