= K-64 (Kansas highway) =

Former state highway in Kansas, U.S.

K-64
- K-64 highlighted in red

Route information
- Maintained by KDOT
- Length: 3.574 mi (5.752 km)
- Existed: c. 1932–July 10, 2015

Major junctions
- West end: US-281 south of Pratt
- East end: US-54 / US-400 east of Pratt

Location
- Country: United States
- State: Kansas
- Counties: Pratt

Highway system
- Kansas State Highway System; Interstate; US; State; Spurs
| ← K-63 | → K-65 |

K-64 was a 3.574-mile-long (5.752 km) state highway in Pratt County, Kansas. The highway was a partial bypass of Pratt that ran from U.S. Route 281 (US-281) just south of the city limits to US-54 and US-400 east of them. The route was maintained by the Kansas Department of Transportation until July 10, 2015 when the road was turned over to Pratt County. K-64 was not part of the National Highway System.

Before state highways were numbered in Kansas there were auto trails. The eastern terminus follows the former Cannon Ball Route and Atlantic and Pacific Highway. K-64 was designated around 1932, and paved in 1937. It was decommissioned July 10, 2015, after the Kansas Department of Transportation expanded several miles of US-54 and US-400 east of Pratt to four lanes. In exchange for the expansion, Pratt County agreed to take control of K-64.

== Route description ==
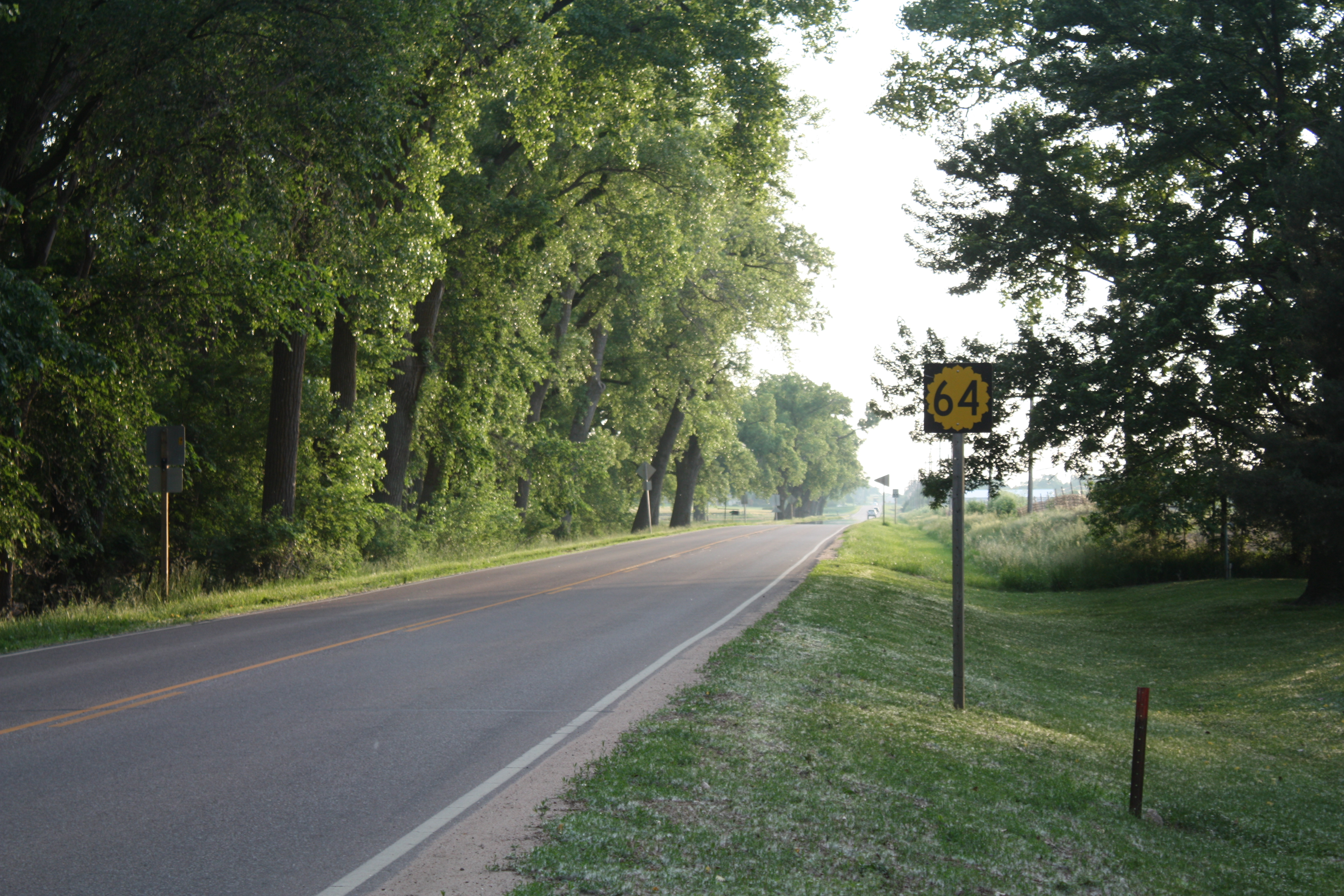
K-64 southeast of Pratt

K-64 began at an intersection with US-281 just south of Pratt. The highway went east on a two-lane road through a hilly, slightly wooded area. The road passed south of an unnamed lake, then turned to the north. The route then crossed the south fork of the Ninnescah River and the Kansas and Oklahoma Railroad before reaching its northern terminus at a T intersection with US-54 and US-400.

K-64 was maintained by the Kansas Department of Transportation (KDOT). In 2012, the traffic on the route, calculated in annual average daily traffic, was 750 vehicles per day on the north–south section and 1260 vehicles per day on the east–west section. K-64 was not a part of the National Highway System, which is a system of highways considered important to the nation's defense, economy, and mobility. K-64 did connect to the National Highway System at its eastern terminus.

== History ==
Prior to the formation of the Kansas state highway system, there were auto trails, which were an informal network of marked routes that existed in the United States and Canada in the early part of the 20th century. The eastern terminus follows the former Cannon Ball Route and Atlantic and Pacific Highway.

K-64 was designated by 1932, and at that time extended from K-8 east then north to US-54. Then between July 1938 and 1940, K-8 was renumbered to US-281. The route was paved with an oil surface in 1937, and it had not changed until it was decommissioned. K-64 was decommissioned on July 10, 2015, after KDOT had expanded several miles of US-54 and US-400 east of Pratt to four lanes. After the expansion, Pratt County agreed to take control of K-64.

== Major intersections ==
The entire route was in Pratt County.

| Location | mi | km | Destinations | Notes |
|---|---|---|---|---|
| Center Township | 0.000 | 0.000 | US-281 – Medicine Lodge, Pratt | Western terminus; road continued as 10th Street |
| Saratoga Township | 3.574 | 5.752 | US-54 / US-400 | Eastern terminus |
1.000 mi = 1.609 km; 1.000 km = 0.621 mi
