= County Route 539 (New Jersey) =

County highway in New Jersey, U.S.

County Route 539
- CR 539 highlighted in red, CR 539 Alt. in blue

Route information
- Length: 54.32 mi (87.42 km)
- Tourist routes: Upper Freehold Historic Farmland Byway

Major junctions
- South end: US 9 / CR 603 in Tuckerton
- G.S. Parkway in Little Egg Harbor Township; Route 72 in Barnegat Township; Route 70 in Manchester Township; I-195 in Robbinsville/Upper Freehold Township; Route 33 in Hightstown; US 130 in Cranbury
- North end: CR 535 / CR 685 in Cranbury

Location
- Country: United States
- State: New Jersey
- Counties: Ocean, Monmouth, Mercer, Middlesex

Highway system
- County routes in New Jersey; 500-series routes
← CR 538	→ CR 540

County Route 539 (CR 539) is a county highway in the U.S. state of New Jersey. The highway extends 54.32 miles (87.42 km) from Main Street (U.S. Route 9 or US 9) in Tuckerton to CR 535 in Cranbury Township. Much of the two-lane route passes through isolated areas of the Pine Barrens and the eastern end of the Fort Dix entity of Joint Base McGuire–Dix–Lakehurst. In these stretches, the route has a speed limit of 55 miles per hour (89 km/h), one of the few two-lane roads in the state to carry a 55 mph limit. CR 539 passes through three boroughs: Tuckerton, Allentown, and Hightstown. Other than those boroughs, the route travels mainly through rural townships.

== Route description ==
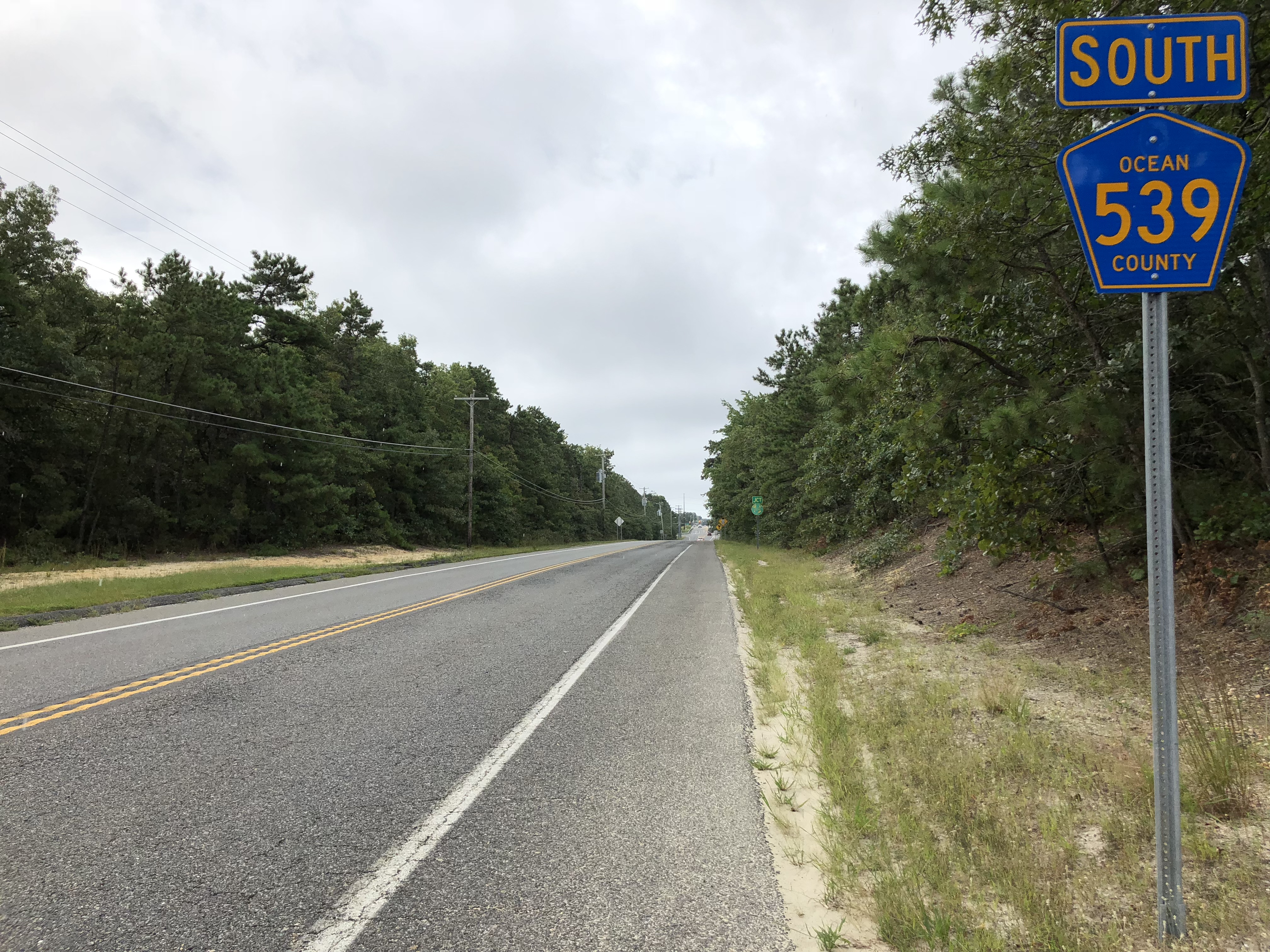
CR 539 southbound past CR 606 in Little Egg Harbor Township

CR 539 begins at an intersection with US 9 in Tuckerton, Ocean County, heading north on two-lane undivided North Green Street. South of US 9, the road continues as CR 603. The route passes through residential areas as it becomes the border between Little Egg Harbor Township to the west and Tuckerton to the east before fully entering Little Egg Harbor Township. CR 539 heads through decreasing residential development as it heads into the densely forested Pine Barrens and intersects CR 602 prior to an interchange with the Garden State Parkway. Following this interchange, the speed limit of the road rises to 55 miles per hour (89 km/h), the route comes to a junction with CR 606, and passes through the rural Pine Barrens for several miles. Upon crossing into Stafford Township, the road passes through the small residential community of Warren Grove, where it intersects CR 608. From here, CR 539 passes through more forest, intersecting CR 610 before becoming Warren Grove-Whiting Road entering Barnegat Township and crossing Route 72/CR 532.

After this intersection, the road continues north and passes through Lacey Township as Cedar Bridge-Whiting Road before entering Manchester Township and becoming Roosevelt City Road. The route passes near a few wooded areas of homes before running through more forest, crossing a New Jersey Seashore Lines railroad line, and passing housing developments and businesses in the community of Whiting. Here, CR 539 intersects CR 530 and forms a brief concurrency with that route, passing businesses as it comes to the Route 70 junction. At this point, CR 530 turns west along Route 70 and CR 539 heads northwest into more of the Pine Barrens on Whiting-New Egypt Road, becoming Pinehurst Road at the CR 14 junction. The route briefly passes through Jackson Township before entering Plumsted Township, where the road turns northwest and north through forested areas of the Fort Dix Military Reservation. After leaving the Fort Dix grounds, CR 539's speed limit drops to 50 miles per hour (80 km/h) and enters a mix of farms and woods with a few homes and businesses, heading northwest and crossing CR 640. Following this junction, the route enters more wooded areas of residential development, passing New Egypt Speedway before crossing CR 528. The county route becomes concurrent with CR 528 Truck and passes more rural areas of homes before becoming Hornerstown Road and reaching an intersection with CR 537, where CR 528 Truck turns west onto that route.

Upon crossing CR 537, CR 539 enters Upper Freehold Township in Monmouth County and intersects CR 27, at which point the road becomes Trenton-Forked River Road and heads through agricultural areas with some homes, crossing another section of CR 27. The route heads through more areas of farms, woods, and residences, where it turns west onto Davis-Allentown Road at a roundabout with CR 539 Alt. and runs northwest through more rural areas. CR 539 enters Allentown, where it becomes High Street and passes through residential areas before intersecting CR 524. CR 539 forms a concurrency with CR 524, with the two routes continuing northeast along Main Street to a short overlap with CR 526. The road leaves Allentown for Upper Freehold Township and enters farmland as it intersects CR 526 Spur. A short distance later, CR 524/CR 539 reaches an interchange with Interstate 195 (I-195).

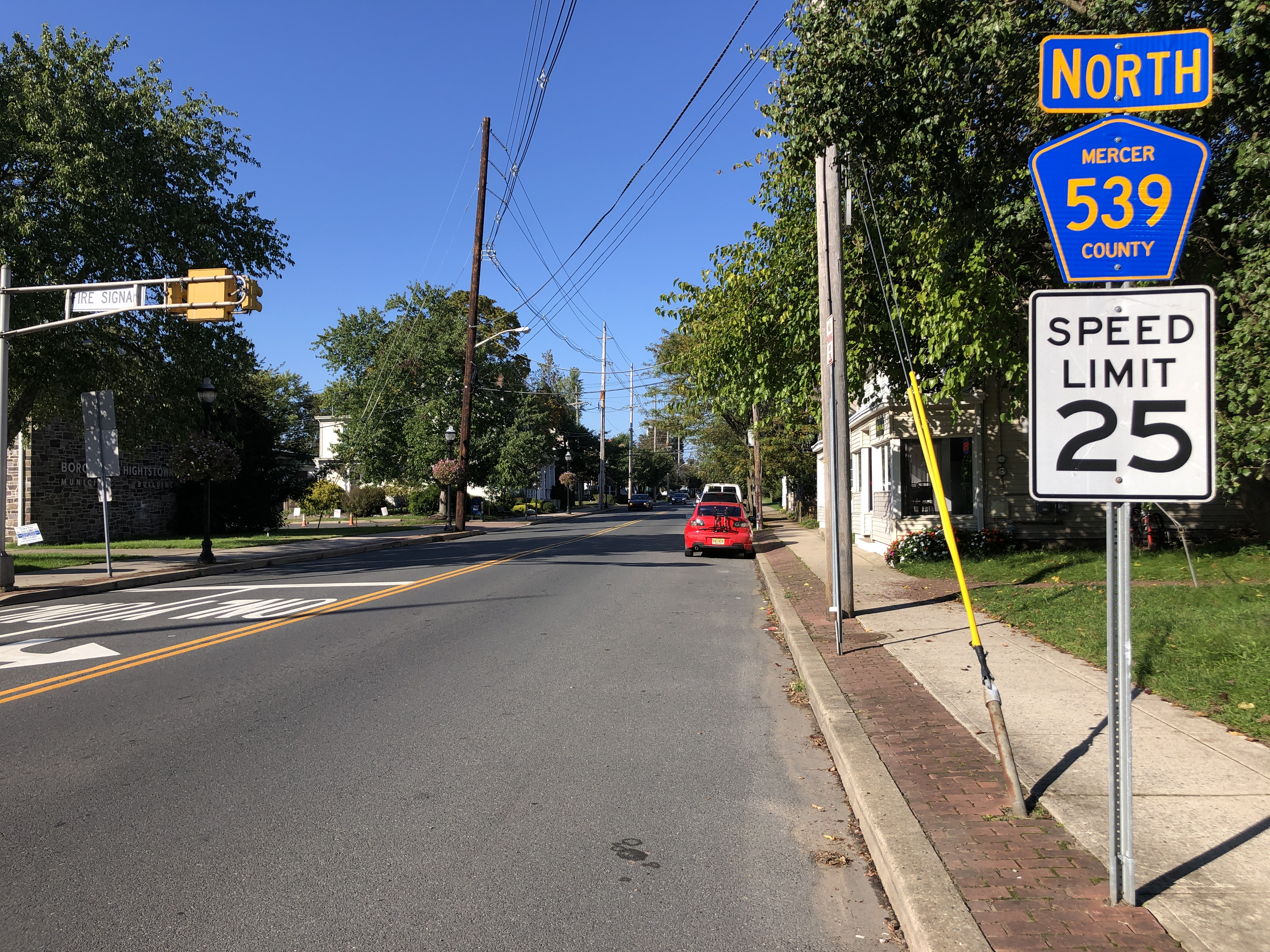
View north along CR 539 along Main Street in Hightstown

At this point, the name of the road becomes Old York Road and it forms the border between Robbinsville Township, Mercer County to the west and Upper Freehold Township, Monmouth County to the east briefly before CR 524 splits from CR 539 by turning east along New Canton-Stone Tavern Road. CR 539 continues northeast past a mix of farms and residential subdivisions before passing through more agricultural surroundings. The road briefly turns east and runs through a wooded part of Millstone Township, Monmouth County. After a turn to the north, CR 539 enters East Windsor Township in Mercer County and passes farms with some homes, intersecting CR 630 before passing over the New Jersey Turnpike (I-95). Following this, the road passes through residential subdivisions before entering Hightstown. CR 539 then becomes South Main Street at this point and passes homes, with CR 571 joining the route from the east. Upon reaching the commercial downtown of Hightstown, northbound CR 539/CR 571 join Route 33 as it merges from Mercer Street onto Main Street. (Traveling southbound, CR 539/571 follow Route 33 onto Mercer Street for one block before turning east onto Ward Street and then south onto South Main Street.) CR 571 then leaves the concurrency by turning to the west on Stockton Street. After crossing the Rocky Brook, Route 33 splits from CR 539 by turning to the east on Franklin Street while CR 539 continues on North Main Street past more homes, intersecting CR 633. The road heads back into East Windsor Township and runs through farmland, passing under Route 133. The road passes near housing developments, becoming South Main Street as it crosses the Millstone River into Cranbury Township, Middlesex County, in wooded areas. CR 539 reaches an intersection with US 130 a short distance later at a modified traffic circle. Continuing north along South Main Street, CR 539 ends at a signalized intersection with CR 535 and CR 685 (Old Trenton Road).

== History ==
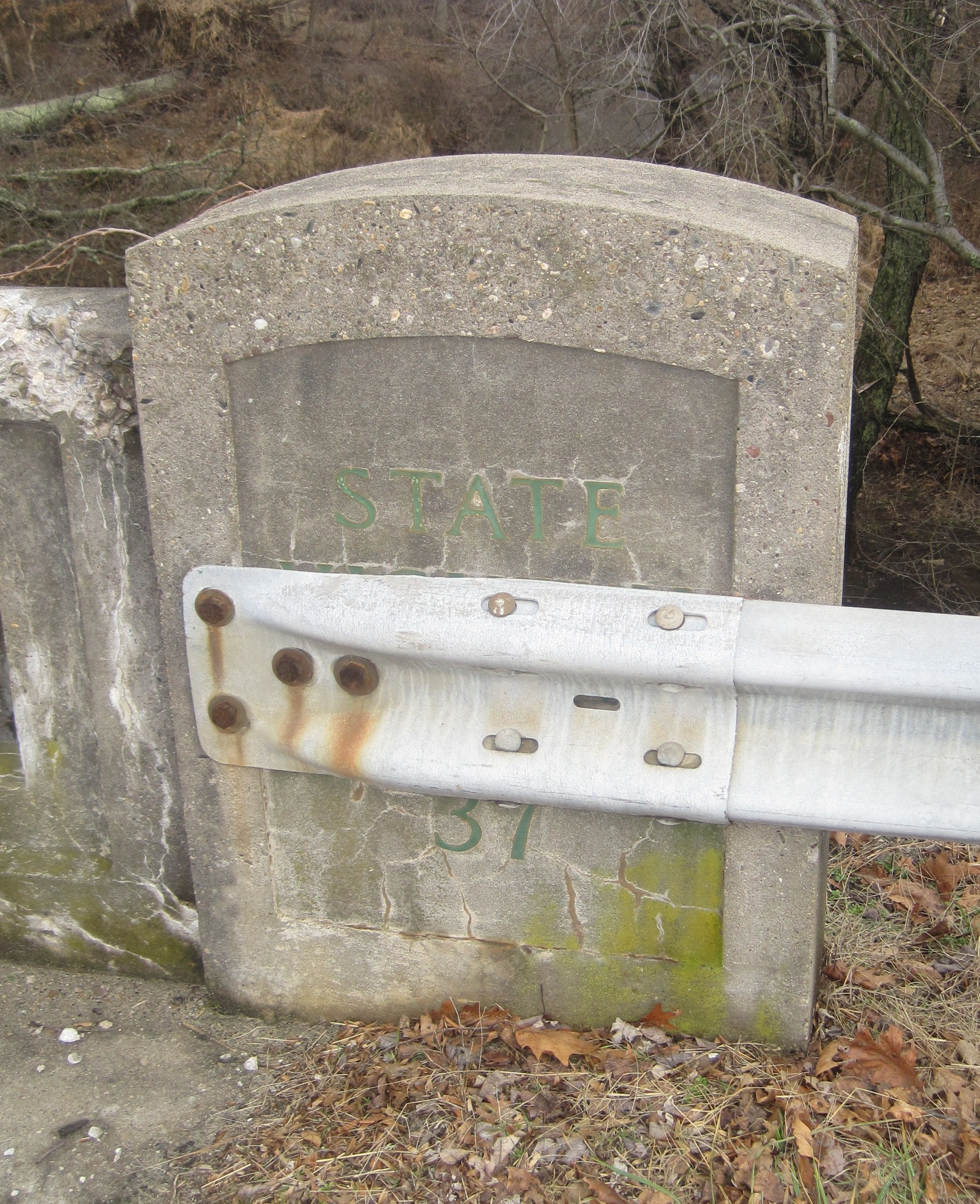
"State Highway Route 37" stamp (partially obscured) on side of the bridge

When the 500-series county routes were first designated in the 1950s, CR 539 traveled west from Hightstown to Princeton on Stockton Street, Princeton–Hightstown Road, and Washington Road, the route of present-day CR 571. It became CR 571 by 1976. More recently, the state had previously designated CR 539's northern terminus to be at the US 130 traffic circle though signage at and around the intersection showed CR 539 continuing north of the circle. CR 685 was the official designation for this portion of South Main Street. By 2019, the current terminus had been established by the state. Two special routes of CR 539 existed at the creation of the 500-series county routes. County Route 539 Spur ran from Warren Grove to Waretown. The road today is now Ocean County Route 610 from CR 539 to Route 72, and CR 532 from Route 72 to its current end at US 9 (CR 532 at the time ran on what is now CR 554). This designation was removed by 1961. County Route 539 Alternate followed what is now CR 526 from Allentown to Princeton Junction. It was renumbered as a western extension of CR 526 by 1956. A Monmouth County-takeover of Sharon Station Road in Upper Freehold known as County Route 539 Alternate occurred in 2009.

Parts of CR 539 in Ocean and Monmouth counties were planned to be a part of Route 37 which would have run from Trenton to Seaside Heights. The section of the road which was actually built as a state highway was between Hornerstown Road in Plumsted Township and Burlington Path Road (CR 27) in Upper Freehold. Though this section is no longer state-maintained, this section of CR 539 still has a wide right-of-way, wide shoulders, and an old bridge from 1940 with "State Highway Route 37" engraved on the ends.

== Major intersections ==
County	Location	mi	km	Destinations	Notes
Ocean	Tuckerton	0.00	0.00	US 9 – Toms River, Absecon	
Ocean	Little Egg Harbor Township	3.49– 3.56	5.62– 5.73	G.S. Parkway	Exit 58 (GSP)
Ocean	Barnegat Township	13.78	22.18	Route 72 / CR 532 to G.S. Parkway north – Red Lion, Long Beach Island	
Ocean	Manchester Township	25.10	40.39	CR 530 east – Whiting	South end of CR 530 concurrency
Ocean	Manchester Township	25.36	40.81	Route 70 / CR 530 west – Camden, Lakehurst	North end of CR 530 concurrency
Ocean	Plumsted Township	35.16	56.58	CR 528 (Lakewood-New Egypt Road) – New Egypt, Lakewood	South end of CR 528 Truck concurrency
Ocean–Monmouth county line	Plumsted–Upper Freehold township line	37.17	59.82	CR 537 / CR 528 Truck west (Monmouth Road) – Mt. Holly, Freehold	North end of CR 528 Truck concurrency
Monmouth	Upper Freehold Township	40.81	65.68	CR 539 Alt. north (Sharon Station Road) to I-195 / N.J. Turnpike	Roundabout; southern terminus of CR 539 Alt.
Monmouth	Allentown	44.10	70.97	CR 524 west (South Main Street) – Yardville	South end of CR 524 concurrency
Monmouth	Allentown	44.39	71.44	CR 526 west (Church Street) – Trenton	South end of CR 526 concurrency
Monmouth	Allentown	44.41	71.47	CR 526 east (Walker Street)	North end of CR 526 concurrency
Monmouth	Upper Freehold Township	44.95	72.34	CR 526 Spur south to CR 526 east / CR 539 south – Cream Ridge	Northern terminus of CR 526 Spur
Monmouth–Mercer county line	Upper Freehold–Robbinsville township line	45.32	72.94	I-195 – Trenton, Shore Points	Exit 8 (I-195)
Monmouth–Mercer county line	Upper Freehold–Robbinsville township line	45.50	73.23	CR 524 east – Clarksburg, Freehold	North end of CR 524 concurrency
Mercer	Hightstown	51.55	82.96	CR 571 south (Etra Road) – Etra, Roosevelt	South end of CR 571 concurrency
Mercer	Hightstown	51.92	83.56	Route 33 west (Mercer Street)	South end of Route 33 concurrency
Mercer	Hightstown	51.98	83.65	CR 571 north (Stockton Street)	North end of CR 571 concurrency
Mercer	Hightstown	52.08	83.81	Route 33 east (Franklin Street) to N.J. Turnpike – Freehold	North end of Route 33 concurrency
Middlesex	Cranbury Township	53.53– 53.59	86.15– 86.24	US 130 – New Brunswick, Princeton, Freehold	Cranbury Circle
Middlesex	Cranbury Township	54.32	87.42	CR 535 (South Main Street / Old Trenton Road) / CR 685 east	
1.000 mi = 1.609 km; 1.000 km = 0.621 mi: Concurrency terminus

== CR 539 Alternate ==
County Route 539 Alternate
- Location: Upper Freehold Township
- Length: 1.47 mi (2.37 km)
- Existed: 2009–present

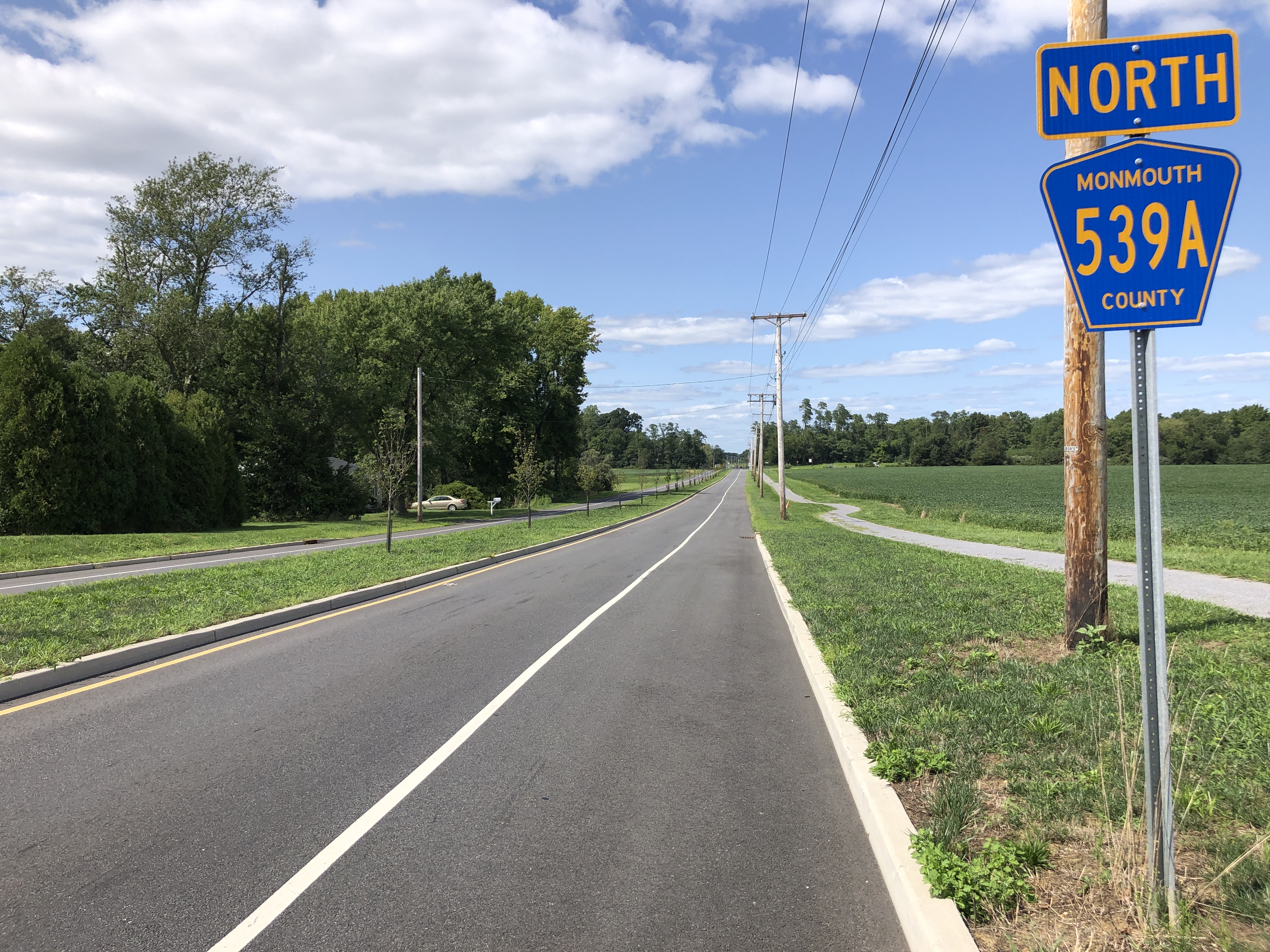
View of CR 539 Alt. past its southern terminus

County Route 539 Alternate (CR 539 Alt. or CR 539A) is a 1.47-mile-long (2.37 km) Monmouth County-maintained segment of Sharon Station Road in Upper Freehold Township. The road begins at a roundabout with CR 539 near the Cream Ridge Golf Course. Its entire length is a divided highway with one lane in each direction and jughandles for U-turn movements and a northbound entrance to Dutchess Drive. It travels north through farmland over Doctors Creek before passing to the east of housing developments. At its signal-controlled intersection with CR 526 where CR 539 Alt. ends, there are light industrial facilities surrounding the junction. Sharon Station Road continues north as a township-maintained road.

In 2009, Monmouth County assumed jurisdiction of the southernmost 1.5 miles (2.4 km) of Sharon Station Road between CR 539 and CR 526 as a part of an overall project to allow through traffic on CR 539 to bypass Allentown. Monmouth County has designated this road County Route 539A although the route became signed as CR 539 Alternate c. 2015 between CR 539 and CR 526. Before the takeover, Sharon Station Road was an undivided two-lane municipal road. The road was reconstructed beginning in January 2020 to its present configuration. Reconstruction was substantially completed in 2023.

The county is also proposing taking over jurisdiction of Sharon Station Road between CR 526 and CR 524 which would bring the total mileage to 2.2 miles (3.5 km).
