= New Jersey Route 72 =

State highway in New Jersey, US

Route 72
- Route 72 highlighted in red, and former Route 180 in pink

Route information
- Maintained by NJDOT
- Length: 28.7 mi (46.2 km)
- Existed: January 1, 1953–present

Major junctions
- West end: Route 70 in Woodland Township
- G.S. Parkway in Stafford Township; US 9 in Stafford Township
- East end: CR 607 in Ship Bottom

Location
- Country: United States
- State: New Jersey
- Counties: Burlington, Ocean

Highway system
- New Jersey State Highway Routes; Interstate; US; State; Scenic Byways
← Route 71	→ Route 73
← Route 179	Route 180 shield	→ Route 181
← CR 49	Ocean County Route 50 shield	→ CR 53

Route 72 is a state highway in the U.S. state of New Jersey. It runs 28.7 mi (46.19 km) from the Four Mile Circle with Route 70 in Woodland Township in Burlington County to Long Beach Boulevard (CR 607) in Ship Bottom on Long Beach Island in Ocean County. Route 72 travels through the Pine Barrens as a two-lane undivided road. After an interchange with the Garden State Parkway, the route becomes a four- to six-lane divided highway through built-up areas of Manhawkin and crosses the Manahawkin Bay via the Manahawkin Bay Bridge onto Long Beach Island.

What is now Route 72 was originally designated as Route S40 in 1927, a spur of Route 40 (now Route 70) running from Four Mile to Manahawkin. The road was extended to Ship Bottom by 1941 before it was renumbered to Route 72 in 1953. A realignment that took place in 1969 between US 9 and the Manahawkin Bay Bridge resulted in the designation of Route 180 on the former alignment; this road is now CR 50. Plans in the late 1960s and the 1970s called for a proposed Route 72 freeway, running from the western terminus at Route 70 to the concurrently proposed I-895 at the New Jersey Turnpike in Westampton, connecting Philadelphia's northern suburbs with the Jersey Shore. The freeway plans along with I-895 were canceled by the 1980s. The Manahawkin Bay Bridge underwent deck repairs completed in May 2010, with the bridge slated to be rehabilitated and a parallel span to be built to the south.

== Route description ==
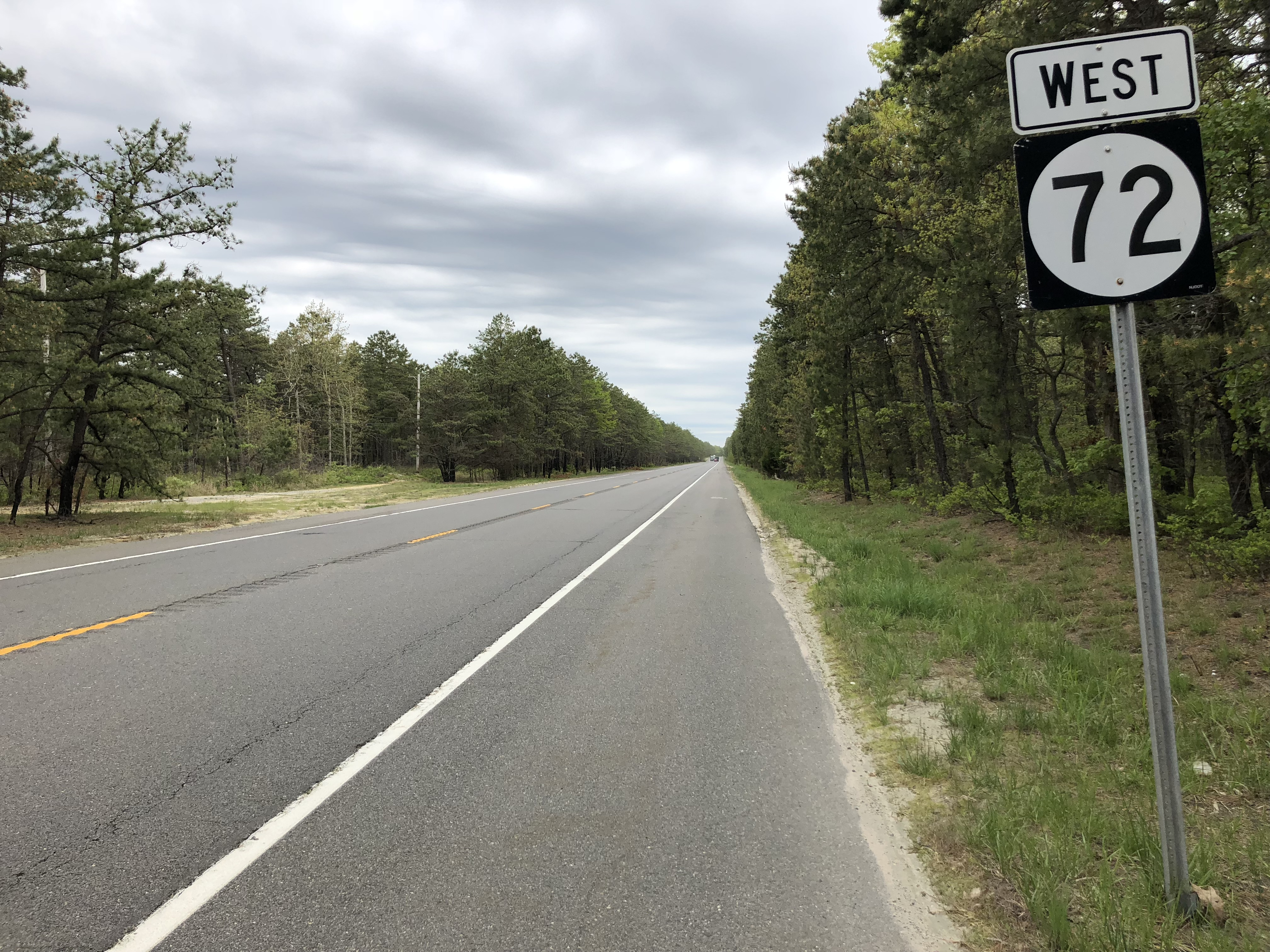
View west along Route 72 just west of Savoy Boulevard in Woodland Township

Route 72 begins at the Four Mile Circle intersection of Route 70, Magnolia Road (CR 644), and Four Mile Road (CR 646) in Woodland Township, Burlington County, heading to the southeast on a two-lane undivided road. The route passes through heavily wooded areas of the Pine Barrens that are a part of the Brendan T. Byrne State Forest. The road passes near a state hospital before coming to an intersection with the northern terminus of CR 563. Past CR 563, the route continues through the Pine Barrens, passing under an abandoned railroad line prior to the intersection of Chatsworth-Barnegat Road (CR 532). Here, Route 72 forms a concurrency with CR 532 and the road enters Barnegat in Ocean County, where it comes to the intersection of Whiting Road (CR 539). From this intersection, Route 72 and CR 532 continue to the intersection of Warren Grove Road (CR 610), where CR 532 splits from the route by heading to the east on Warren Grove Road. A short distance later, the route intersects with West Bay Avenue (CR 554), which continues along Route 72, and turns to the south-southeast through more wooded areas.

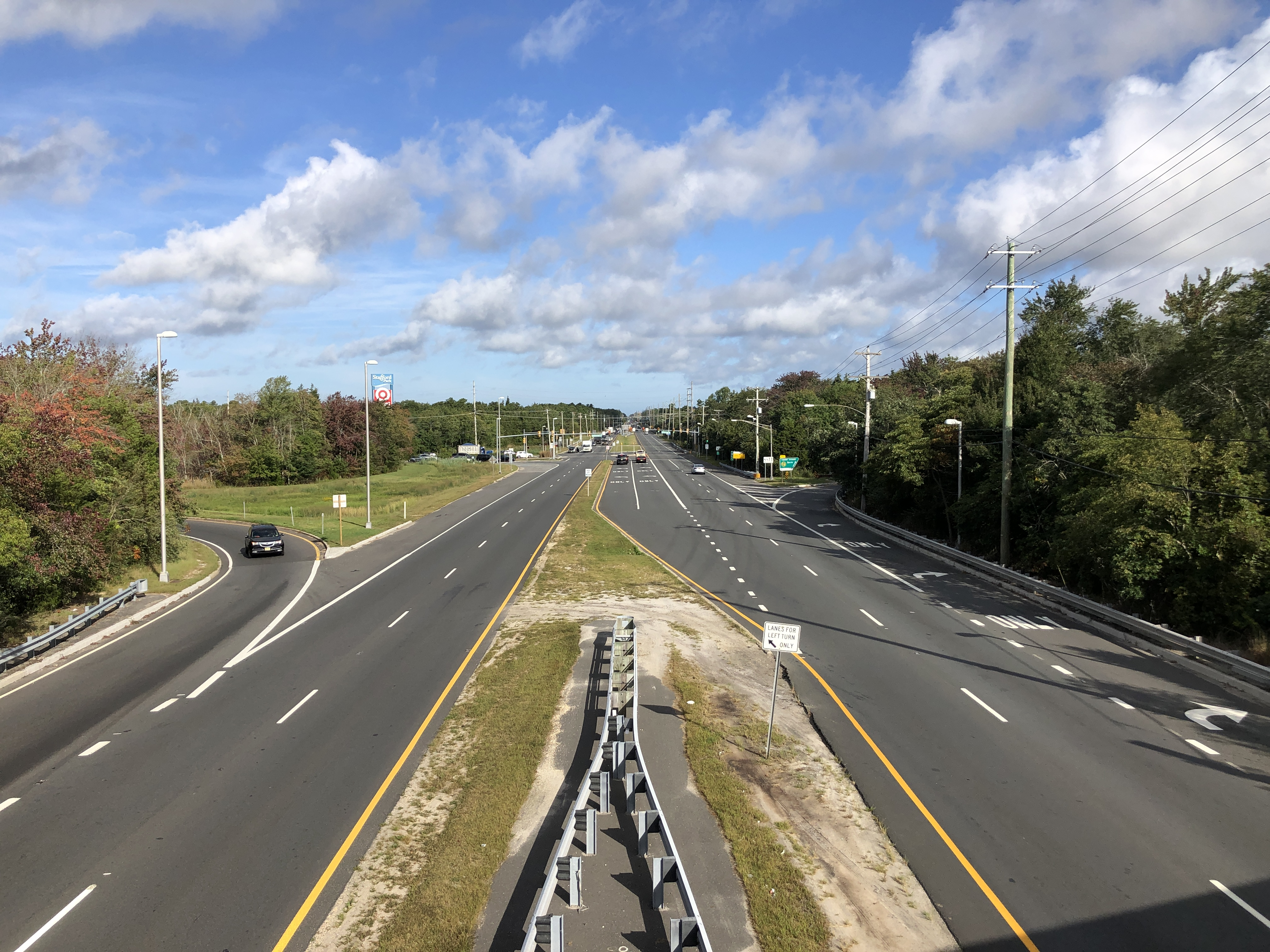
Route 72 westbound at the Garden State Parkway interchange in Stafford Township

The highway enters Stafford Township and passes to the southwest of the residential Ocean Acres community. The route heads to the southwest of Hackensack Meridian Health Southern Ocean Medical Center before it comes to the intersection of Nautilus Drive (CR 111). Past this intersection, Route 72 widens into a four-lane divided highway, intersecting with Lighthouse Drive (CR 105) and Stafford Park Boulevard (CR 2) before coming to an interchange with the Garden State Parkway. Following this interchange, the route enters the Manahawkin area and widens to six lanes as it passes woods to the northeast and business areas to the southwest. Route 72 has an interchange with US 9 and continues southeast through a mix of woods and commercial areas as a four-lane road, with Bay Avenue (CR 50) paralleling the route to the north. The road intersects with Jennings Road (CR 20) and Mill Creek Road (CR 6) before it passes to the north of the Beach Haven West residential development and passes near wetlands. A road provides access to Bay Avenue before Route 72 crosses the Manahawkin Bay on the Manahawkin Bay Bridge, also known as the Dorland J. Henderson Memorial Bridge. After traversing two small islands consisting of a mix of residences and marshland, the road continues into Ship Bottom on Long Beach Island. Upon entering Ship Bottom, the route splits into a one-way pair following West 9th Street eastbound and West 8th Street westbound. Route 72 passes by resort businesses, intersecting with Barnegat Avenue (CR 4) and Central Avenue (CR 89) before ending at the intersection of Long Beach Boulevard (CR 607) a block from the Atlantic Ocean.

Route 72 is a major route providing access to Long Beach Island, a popular Jersey Shore resort, from Philadelphia via Route 70 and from New York City via the Garden State Parkway. As such, the portion of the route east of the Garden State Parkway interchange sees congestion during the summer months. It is also the only road bridge to connect Long Beach Island to the mainland, which is why in emergency evacuations such as hurricanes, the highway and Manahawkin Bridge becomes clogged.

== History ==
Route S40
- Location: Woodland Township–Manahawkin
- Existed: 1927–1953

What is now Route 72 was originally designated as Route S40 in the 1927 New Jersey state highway renumbering. It was to be a spur of Route 40 that was to run from Route 40 at Four Mile to Route 4 (now US 9) in Manahawkin. By 1941, the route was extended east to the intersection with Long Beach Boulevard in Ship Bottom. In the 1953 New Jersey state highway renumbering, Route S40 was renumbered to Route 72. By 1969, Route 72 was moved to a new alignment to the south between US 9 and the Manahawkin Bay Bridge; the old alignment became Route 180. This route was eventually removed from the state highway system and is now CR 50, although more commonly known as "Bay Avenue".

Route 72 westbound at US 9 in Manahawkin

A freeway was originally proposed for the Route 72 corridor in the late 1960s. The Route 72 freeway was planned to run from the Four Mile Circle to the New Jersey Turnpike in Westampton, where it would connect to the proposed I-895 that would continue to I-95 near Bristol, Pennsylvania. The existing Route 72 would also be widened into a four-lane divided highway. Both I-895 and Route 72 were intended to connect Bucks County, Pennsylvania and the Willingboro area with the Jersey Shore. The proposed freeway for Route 72 was to cost $39 million. However, construction costs and the desire to use money for mass transit led to cancellation of both I-895 and the Route 72 freeway by the 1980s.

In 2000, the Manahawkin Bay Bridge was dedicated the Dorland J. Henderson Memorial Bridge in honor of Dorland J. Henderson, who was one of NJDOT’s top engineers that designed the lighting system for the Manahawkin Bay Bridge. In September 2009, the NJDOT began repairs to the deck of the Manahawkin Bay Bridge. This project, completed in May 2010, cost $4 million and received funding from the American Recovery and Reinvestment Act of 2009. The Manahawkin Bay Bridge underwent a rehabilitation project and a parallel bridge was built to the south. Construction began on the project May 3, 2013. The new bridge was completed in 2016 and carried traffic from both directions while the older bridge was rehabilitated. The rehabilitation of the original bridge was completed in 2019, at which point traffic began using both bridges.

== Major intersections ==
County	Location	mi	km	Destinations	Notes
Burlington	Woodland Township	0.0	0.0	Route 70 to N.J. Turnpike / G.S. Parkway north – Medford, Cherry Hill, Lakehurst New Lisbon Pemberton, Fort Dix, Mt Holly	Western terminus, Four Mile Circle
Burlington	Woodland Township	3.4	5.5	CR 563 south – Chatsworth, New Gretna, Batsto	Northern terminus of CR 563
Burlington	Woodland Township	8.2	13.2	CR 532 west (Chatsworth-Barnegat Rd) – Chatsworth	West end of the overlap with CR 532
Ocean	Barnegat Township	13.7	22.0	CR 539 (Whiting Rd) – Whiting, Trenton, Tuckerton	
Ocean	Barnegat Township	15.8	25.4	CR 532 east (Warren Grove Rd) – Waretown, Brookville CR 610 west (Warren Grove Rd) – Warren Grove	East end of the overlap with CR 532; western terminus of CR 610
Ocean	Barnegat Township	16.3	26.2	CR 554 east (W Bay Ave) – Barnegat	Western terminus of CR 554
Ocean	Stafford Township	21.6– 21.6	34.8– 34.8	G.S. Parkway	Exit 63 southbound, 63A-B northbound (Garden State Parkway)
Ocean	Stafford Township	23.2	37.3	US 9 – Manahawkin, Atlantic City	Interchange
Ocean	Manahawkin Bay	26.9	43.3	Manahawkin Bay Bridge	
Ocean	Ship Bottom	28.7	46.2	CR 607 (Long Beach Blvd) – Surf City, Barnegat Light, Brant Beach, Beach Haven	Eastern terminus
1.000 mi = 1.609 km; 1.000 km = 0.621 mi: Concurrency terminus
