= County Route 532 (New Jersey) =

County highway in New Jersey, U.S.

County Route 532
- CR 532 highlighted in red

Route information
- Maintained by Medford Lakes, Medford Township, Tabernacle Township, Burlington County, NJDOT, Ocean County
- Length: 35.19 mi (56.63 km)

Major junctions
- West end: CR 541 in Medford Lakes
- US 206 in Tabernacle Township; CR 563 in Woodland Township; Route 72 in Woodland Township; CR 539 in Barnegat Township; G.S. Parkway in Ocean Township
- East end: US 9 / CR 612 in Ocean Township

Location
- Country: United States
- State: New Jersey
- Counties: Burlington, Ocean

Highway system
- County routes in New Jersey; 500-series routes
← CR 531	→ CR 533

County Route 532 (CR 532) is a county highway in the U.S. state of New Jersey. The highway extends 35.19 miles (56.63 km) from Stokes Road (CR 541) on the Medford Township–Medford Lakes border to Bryant Road (U.S. Route 9 or US 9) in Ocean Township. It runs concurrent with Route 72 from Chatsworth-Barnegat Road to Warren Grove Road (northern terminus of Ocean CR 610).

== Route description ==
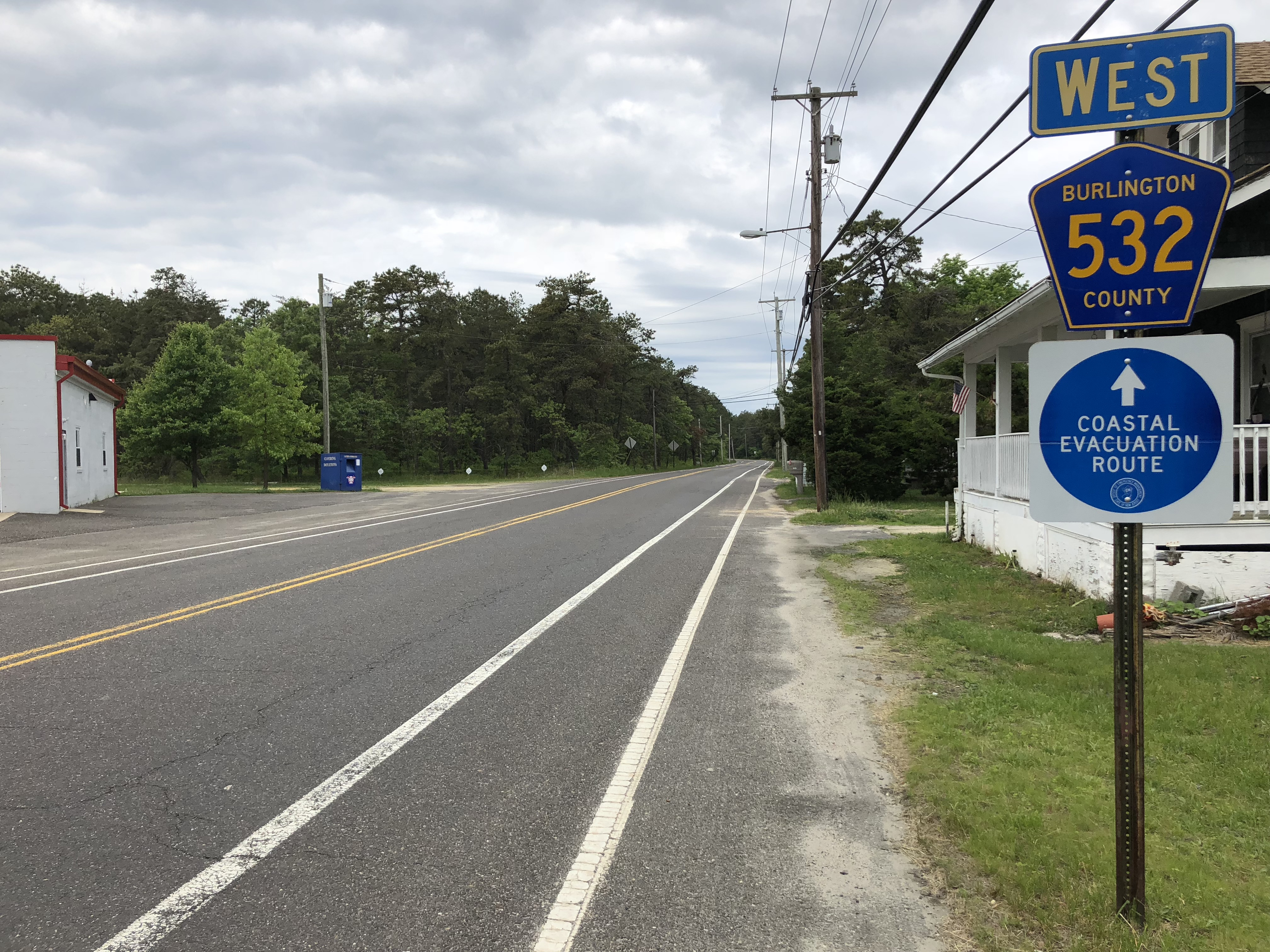
View west along CR 532 at CR 563 in Woodland Township

CR 532 begins at an intersection with CR 541 on the border between Medford to the north and Medford Lakes to the south in Burlington County, heading east on the municipally-maintained two-lane Tabernacle Road. The road passes through wooded residential areas, fully entering Medford Lakes before straddling the border between Medford and Medford Lakes several times. The route eventually fully enters Medford as it enters more forested areas containing residential subdivisions before coming into Tabernacle Township, where it becomes Medford Lakes Road. After crossing US 206, Burlington County maintenance begins and CR 532 continues east into more agricultural areas with a few homes, crossing CR 648. Farther east, the route becomes Chatsworth Road and heads into densely forested areas of the Pine Barrens, running along the northern edge of the Wharton State Forest. CR 532 heads away from Wharton State Forest and continues into Woodland Township, passing through more miles of forests before passing Chatsworth Lake and entering the residential community of Chatsworth. In Chatsworth, CR 532 heads south for a brief concurrency with CR 563 on Chatsworth-Green Bank Road, crossing an abandoned railroad line, before turning east onto Chatsworth-Waretown Road. The road heads northeast and east through more of the Pine Barrens before intersecting Route 72 and turning southeast to join that route.

Route 72/CR 532 enters Barnegat Township in Ocean County, where it comes to a crossroads with CR 539. From this intersection, Route 72 and CR 532 continue to a junction with CR 610, where CR 532 splits from the Route 72 by heading to the northeast on Warren Grove-Waretown Road. The route continues into Ocean Township and intersects CR 611. Farther east, the road briefly enters Lacey Township before crossing back into Ocean Township and coming to an interchange with the Garden State Parkway. After this interchange, the route continues east past forest to the north and wooded residential subdivisions to the south, becoming Wells Mills Road as CR 532 reaches its eastern terminus at US 9 in the community of Waretown. Past US 9, the road continues east as CR 612 / Bryant Road.

== Major intersections ==
County	Location	mi	km	Destinations	Notes
Burlington	Medford Township–Medford Lakes municipal line	0.00	0.00	CR 541 (Stokes Road)	Western terminus
Burlington	Tabernacle Township	4.05	6.52	US 206 – Trenton, Hammonton	
Burlington	Woodland Township	15.27	24.57	CR 563 north (Chatsworth Green Bank Road)	West end of CR 563 overlap
Burlington	Woodland Township	15.38	24.75	CR 563 south (Main Street) / 1st Street	East end of CR 563 overlap
Burlington	Woodland Township	19.43	31.27	Route 72 west – Red Lion	West end of Route 72 overlap
Ocean	Barnegat Township	24.96	40.17	CR 539 (Whiting Road) – Whiting, Trenton, Tuckerton	
Ocean	Barnegat Township	27.09	43.60	Route 72 east / CR 610 west (Warren Grove Road) – Long Beach Island, Warren Grove	East end of Route 72 overlap
Ocean	Ocean Township	32.97– 33.04	53.06– 53.17	G.S. Parkway	Exit 69 (Garden State Parkway)
Ocean	Ocean Township	35.19	56.63	US 9 / CR 612 east (Bryant Road) – Toms River, Manahawkin, Atlantic City	Eastern terminus
1.000 mi = 1.609 km; 1.000 km = 0.621 mi: Concurrency terminus; Tolled
