= Protestant Community Church of Medford Lakes =

- U.S. National Register of Historic Places
- New Jersey Register of Historic Places
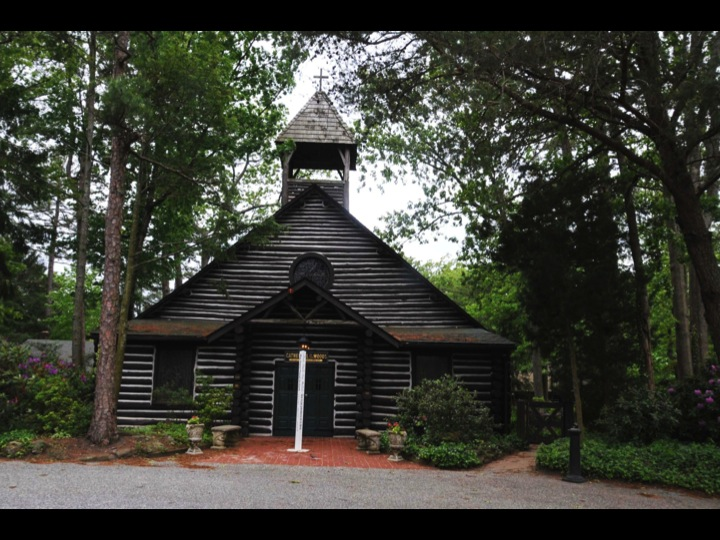

- Location within Burlington County, New Jersey Location within New Jersey Location within the United States
- Location: 100 Stokes Road, Medford Lakes, New Jersey
- Coordinates: 39°51′44″N 74°48′20″W
- Built: 1931
- Architectural style: Log cabin
- NRHP reference No.: 100001263
- NJRHP No.: 4265

Significant dates
- Added to NRHP: July 3, 2017
- Designated NJRHP: May 1, 2017

The Protestant Community Church of Medford Lakes, also known as the Cathedral of the Woods, is located at 100 Stokes Road in the borough of Medford Lakes in Burlington County, New Jersey, United States. The log church was built in 1931 and was added to the National Register of Historic Places on July 3, 2017, for its significance in architecture.

== History and description ==
The Medford Lakes Colony Club was created in 1927. According to the nomination form, Mancill Gager, the pioneer builder of log cabins in the resort community, likely built the church, which features rustic architecture. It is surrounded by other log buildings, including Memorial Hall, formerly the St. Mary of the Lakes Catholic Church, which was purchased in 1969.

== See also ==
- National Register of Historic Places listings in Burlington County, New Jersey
