= Bullock, New Jersey =

Populated place in Burlington County, New Jersey, US

- Unincorporated community
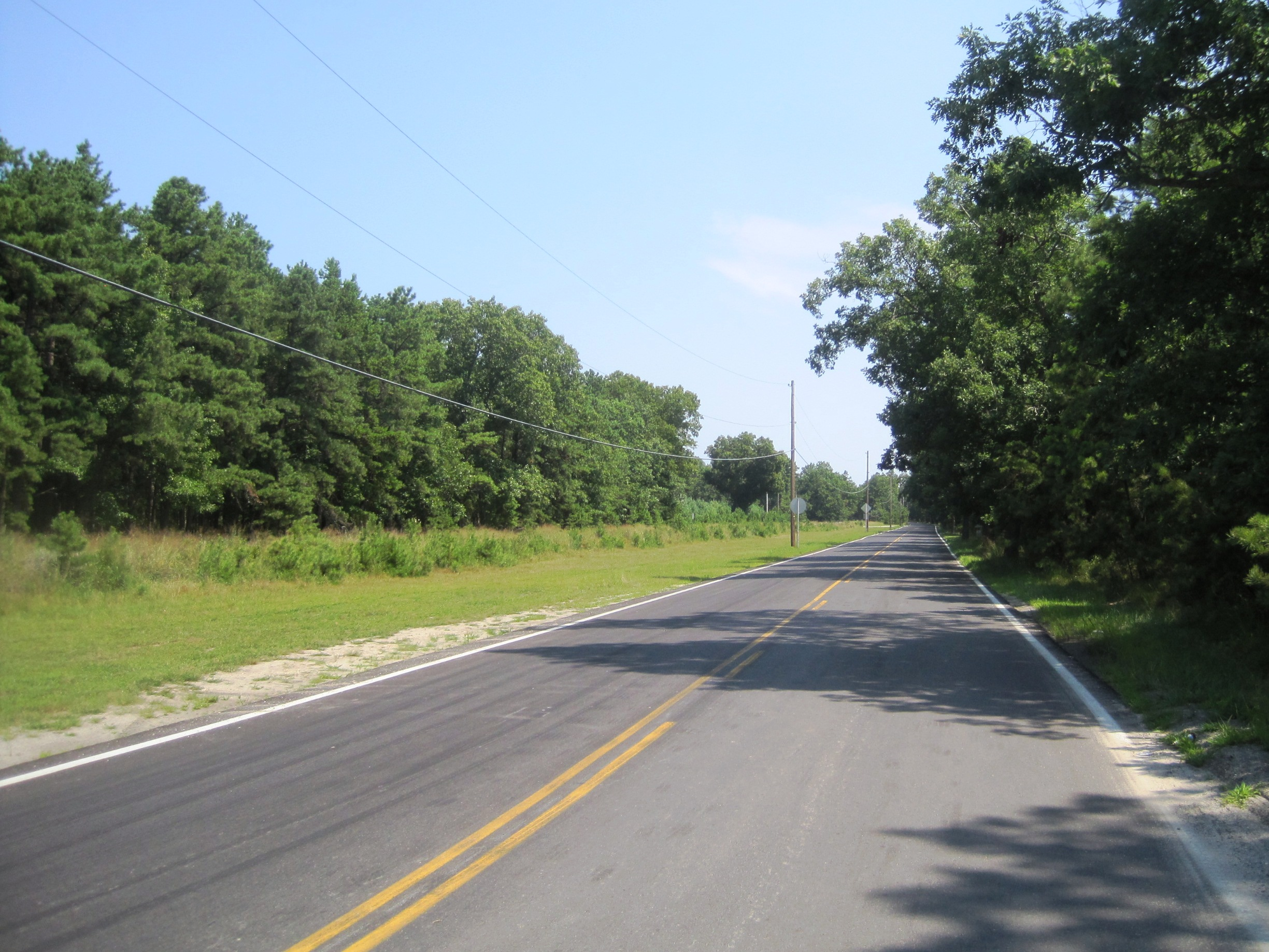
- Along Pasadena Road

- Location of Bullock in Burlington County (Inset: Location of county within the state of New Jersey) Location of Bullock in Ocean County (Inset: Ocean County in New Jersey) Location of Bullock in New Jersey Location of Bullock in the United States
- Coordinates: 39°52′54″N 74°26′59″W
- Country: United States
- State: New Jersey
- County: Burlington, Ocean
- Township: Woodland, Manchester
- Elevation: 144 ft (44 m)
- Time zone: UTC−05:00 (Eastern (EST))
  - Summer (DST): UTC−04:00 (EDT)
- GNIS feature ID: 875023

Bullock is an unincorporated community that straddles Woodland Township, Burlington County and Manchester Township, Ocean County in the middle of the New Jersey Pine Barrens. Much of the area surrounding Bullock is a part of the Brendan T. Byrne State Forest though there are some clearings for small houses along Savoy Boulevard in Woodland Township and Pasadena Road in Manchester Township. The settlement is located where these two roads, the New Jersey Southern Railroad, and the Keith line (separating the two counties) converge.
