= County Route 554 (New Jersey) =

Highway in New Jersey, United States

County Route 554
- CR 554 highlighted in red

Route information
- Length: 6.07 mi (9.77 km)

Major junctions
- West end: Route 72 in Barnegat Township
- G.S. Parkway in Barnegat Township
- East end: US 9 / CR 609 in Barnegat Township

Location
- Country: United States
- State: New Jersey
- Counties: Ocean

Highway system
- County routes in New Jersey; 500-series routes
← CR 553	→ CR 555

County Route 554 (CR 554) is a county highway in the U.S. state of New Jersey. The highway extends 6.07 miles (9.77 km) from Barnegat Boulevard (Route 72) to Main Street (U.S. Route 9 or US 9) in Barnegat Township. The highway was designated as the easternmost segment of CR 532 in the early 1950s and was later a portion of CR 534, but as it had no connection to the western segment, it was renamed by 1984.

== Route description ==
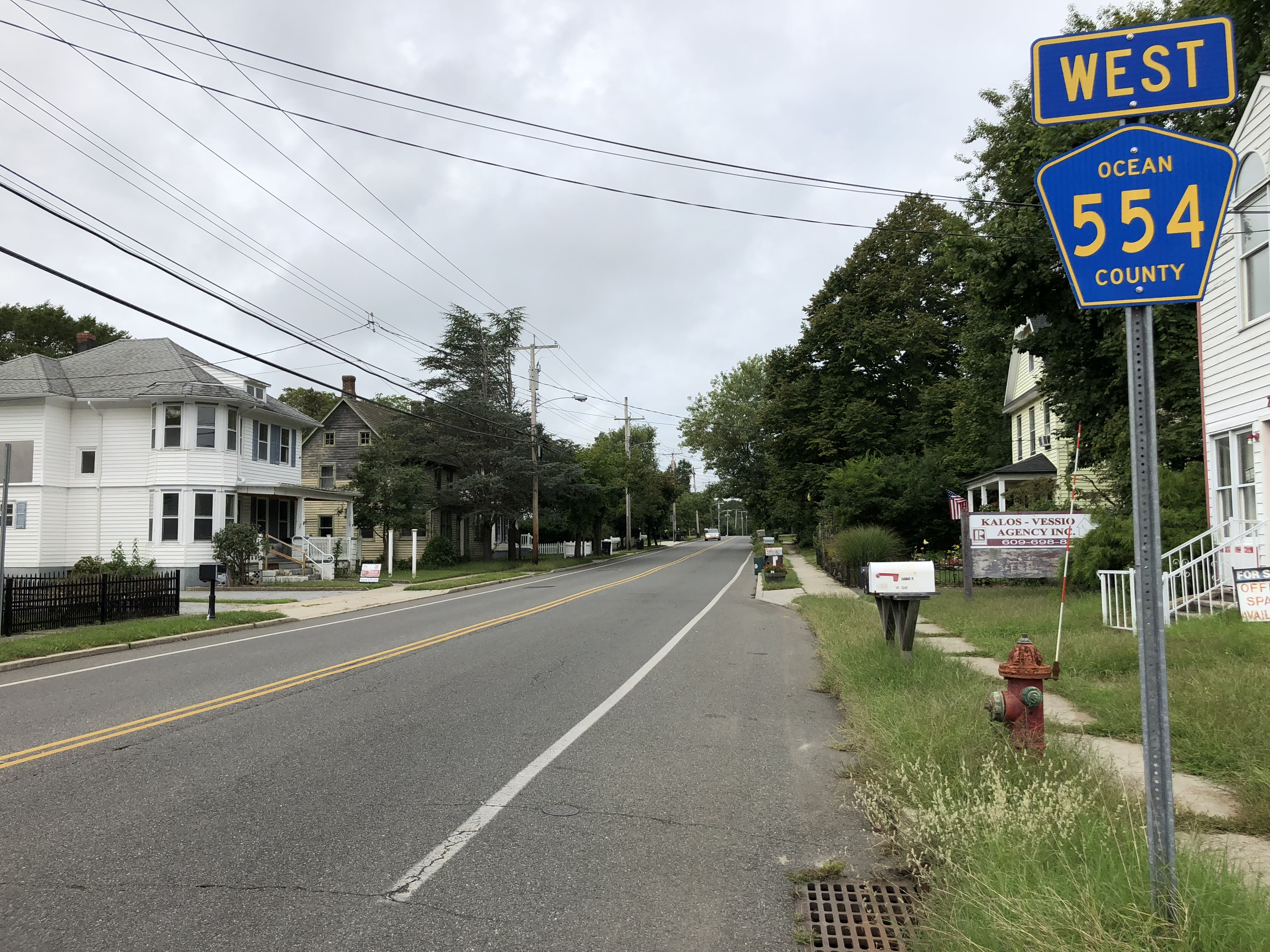
View west at the east end of CR 554 at US 9 in Barnegat Township

CR 554 begins at an intersection with Route 72 in Barnegat Township, heading east on two-lane undivided Barnegat Road. The road runs through forested areas of the Pine Barrens and intersects CR 611. Farther to the east, the route runs near wooded neighborhoods as Bay Avenue, coming to junctions with CR 111 and CR 105. CR 554 comes to a partial interchange with the Garden State Parkway that has access to and from the northbound direction of the parkway. After the interchange, CR 554 passes through business areas and intersects CR 8 and CR 10. In the community of Barnegat, the route comes to its eastern terminus at US 9.

== Major intersections ==
The entire route is in Barnegat Township, Ocean County.

mi	km	Destinations	Notes
0.00	0.00	Route 72	Western terminus
4.45– 4.69	7.16– 7.55	G.S. Parkway	GSP exit 67, opened October 19, 2010
6.07	9.77	US 9 (South Main Street) / CR 609 east (Bay Avenue) – Toms River, Absecon	Eastern terminus
1.000 mi = 1.609 km; 1.000 km = 0.621 mi
