= St. Mary of the Lakes Catholic Church =

Historic church in New Jersey, United States

- U.S. National Register of Historic Places
- New Jersey Register of Historic Places
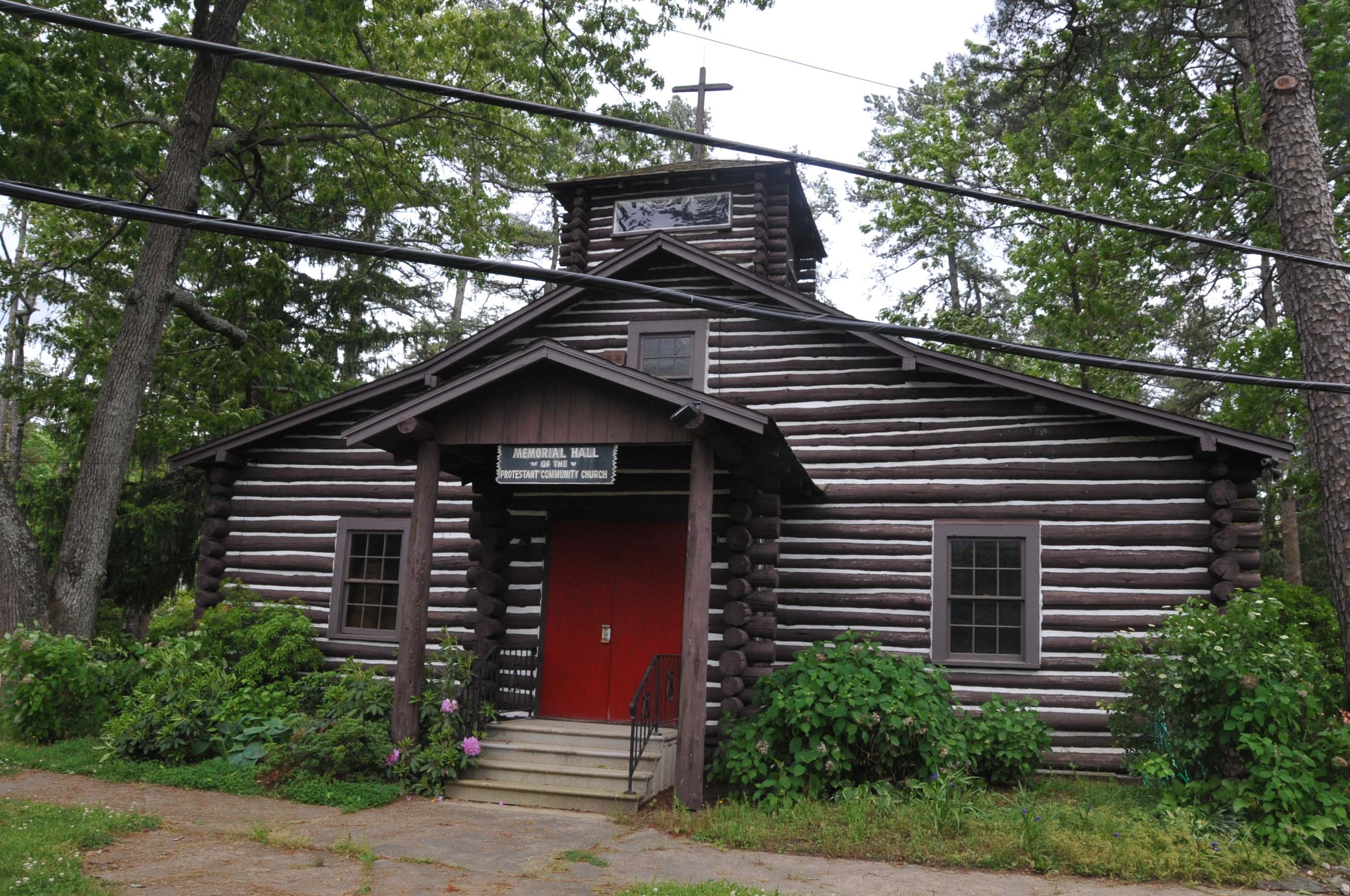

- Location within Burlington County, New Jersey Location within New Jersey Location within the United States
- Location: 108 Stokes Road, Medford Lakes, New Jersey
- Coordinates: 39°51′45″N 74°48′19″W
- Built: 1931
- Architectural style: log cabin
- NRHP reference No.: 07000357
- NJRHP No.: 4703

Significant dates
- Added to NRHP: April 27, 2007
- Designated NJRHP: February 7, 2007

St. Mary of the Lakes Catholic Church is a historic church building at 108 Stokes Road in the borough of Medford Lakes in Burlington County, New Jersey, United States. The log-cabin structure was built in 1931 and added to the National Register of Historic Places on April 27, 2007, for its significance in architecture.

== History and description ==
The Medford Lakes Development Corporation was created in 1926, with construction of the summer resort community of log cabins starting in 1927. According to the nomination form, Mancill Gager, the pioneer builder of log cabins in the resort, likely built the church, which features rustic architecture. It was a mision of the Sacred Heart Church of Mount Holly. In 1969, it was purchased by the Protestant Community Church of Medford Lakes and renamed Memorial Hall.

== See also ==
- National Register of Historic Places listings in Burlington County, New Jersey
