= Woodland Township, New Jersey =

Township in Burlington County, New Jersey, US

- Township
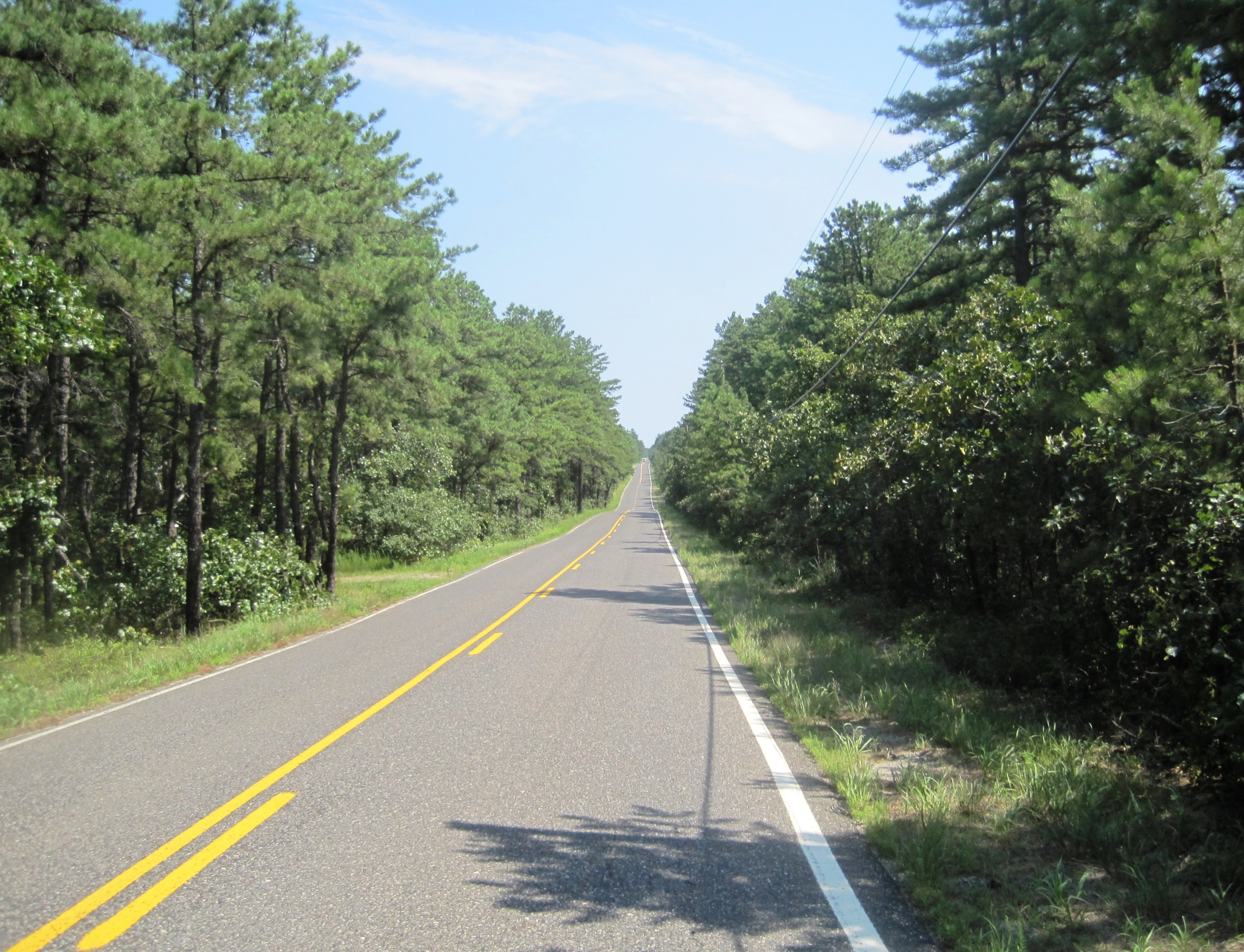
- Savoy Boulevard through the Pine Barrens in Woodland Township

- Seal

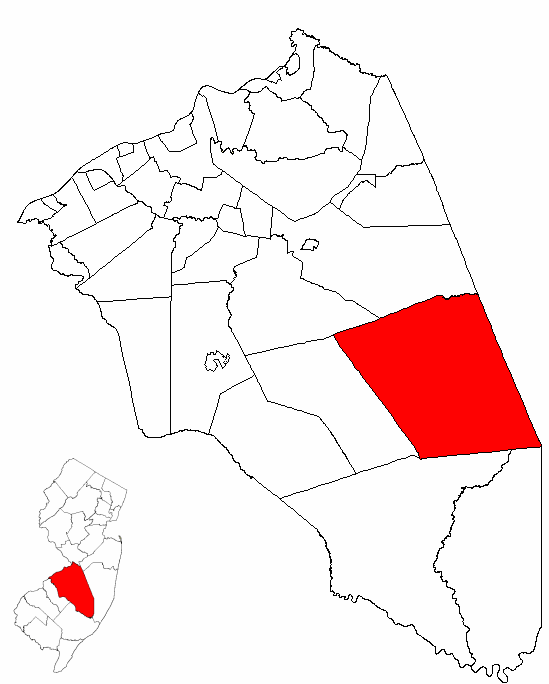
- Woodland Township highlighted in Burlington County. Inset map: Burlington County highlighted in the State of New Jersey.

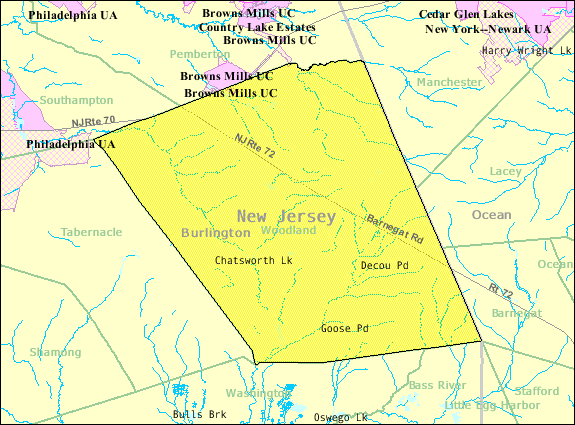
- Census Bureau map of Woodland Township, New Jersey

- Location in Burlington County Location in New Jersey Location in the United States
- Coordinates: 39.841289°N 74.51774°W
- Country: United States
- State: New Jersey
- County: Burlington
- Incorporated: March 7, 1866

Government
  - Type: Township
  - Body: Township Committee
  - Mayor: William DeGroff (R, term ends December 31, 2023)
  - Administrator / Municipal clerk: Maryalice Brown

Area
  - Total: 94.44 sq mi (244.61 km^{2})
  - Land: 92.64 sq mi (239.93 km^{2})
  - Water: 1.81 sq mi (4.68 km^{2}) 1.91%
  - Rank: 7th of 565 in state 2nd of 40 in county
- Elevation: 118 ft (36 m)

Population (2020)
  - Total: 1,544
  - Estimate (2023): 1,552
  - Rank: 509th of 565 in state 35th of 40 in county
  - Density: 16.7/sq mi (6.4/km^{2})
  - Rank: 563rd of 565 in state 39th of 40 in county
- Time zone: UTC−05:00 (Eastern (EST))
  - Summer (DST): UTC−04:00 (Eastern (EDT))
- ZIP Code: 08019 – Chatsworth
- Area code: 609
- FIPS code: 3400582420
- GNIS feature ID: 0882080
- Website: www.woodlandtownship.org

Woodland Township is a township in Burlington County, in the U.S. state of New Jersey. As of the 2020 United States census, the township's population was 1,544, a decrease of 244 (−13.6%) from the 2010 census count of 1,788, which in turn reflected an increase of 618 (+52.8%) from the 1,170 counted in the 2000 census. The township, and all of Burlington County, is a part of the Philadelphia metropolitan area.

Woodland was incorporated as a township by an act of the New Jersey Legislature on March 7, 1866, from portions of Pemberton Township, Shamong Township, Southampton Township and Washington Township. Portions of the township were taken to form Tabernacle Township on March 22, 1901.

== History ==
The area now known as Woodland Township was originally inhabited by the Lenape Native American tribe. European settlers began arriving in the late 17th century, attracted by the fertile soil and abundant lumber resources. The settlers cleared land for farming and built homes and other structures using local materials, including wood and sandstone.

Throughout the late 19th and early 20th centuries, Woodland was predominantly an agricultural community, with farming being the primary occupation for most residents. The fertile soil in the region was ideal for growing a variety of crops, including corn, wheat, and potatoes. In addition to crop farming, livestock, dairy, and poultry farming also played a significant role in the local economy.

In the early 20th century, several small-scale industries began to emerge in Woodland, including sawmills, gristmills, and blacksmith shops. These industries relied heavily on the local resources, such as timber and iron ore, and provided employment opportunities for the residents.

In the latter half of the 20th century, Woodland experienced a shift away from agriculture and towards a more diversified economy. Although farming remained an important aspect of the township's identity, the focus shifted to include manufacturing, retail, and service-based industries.

The township has a mix of residential, commercial, and agricultural areas, reflecting its multifaceted history. Woodland is known for its landscapes, including the scenic Brendan T. Byrne State Forest, which offers numerous recreational opportunities such as hiking, camping, and birdwatching.

== Geography ==
According to the U.S. Census Bureau, the township had a total area of 94.45 square miles (244.61 km^{2}), including 92.64 square miles (239.93 km^{2}) of land and 1.81 square miles (4.68 km^{2}) of water (1.91%).

The township borders Bass River Township, Pemberton Township, Southampton Township, Tabernacle Township, Washington Township in Burlington County; and Barnegat Township, Lacey Township, Little Egg Harbor Township and Manchester Township in Ocean County.

Unincorporated communities, localities and place names located partially or completely within the township include Bullock, Butlers Place, Chatsworth (the postal address for most of the residents of the township), DeCou Pond, Dukes Bridge, Four Mile, Goose Pond, Hedger House, Johnson Place, Jones Mill, Lebanon, Long Causeway, Old Halfway, South Park and Woodmansie.

The township is one of 56 South Jersey municipalities that are included within the New Jersey Pinelands National Reserve, a protected natural area of unique ecology covering 1,100,000 acres (450,000 ha), that has been classified as a United States Biosphere Reserve and established by Congress in 1978 as the nation's first National Reserve. All of the township is included in the state-designated Pinelands Area, which includes portions of Burlington County, along with areas in Atlantic, Camden, Cape May, Cumberland, Gloucester and Ocean counties.

== Demographics ==
Historical population
Census	Pop.	Note	%±
1870	389		—
1880	325		−16.5%
1890	327		0.6%
1900	475		45.3%
1910	548	*	15.4%
1920	970		77.0%
1930	970		0.0%
1940	1,374		41.6%
1950	1,524		10.9%
1960	1,904		24.9%
1970	2,032		6.7%
1980	2,285		12.5%
1990	2,063		−9.7%
2000	1,170		−43.3%
2010	1,788		52.8%
2020	1,554		−13.1%
2023 (est.)	1,552		−0.1%
Population sources:1870–2000 1870–1920 1870 1880–1890; 1890–1910 1910–1930; 1940–2000 2000; 2010 2020 * = Lost territory in previous decade.

=== 2010 census ===
The 2010 United States census counted 1,788 people, 476 households, and 359 families in the township. The population density was 18.9 per square mile (7.3/km^{2}). There were 494 housing units at an average density of 5.2 per square mile (2.0/km^{2}). The racial makeup was 89.60% (1,602) White, 8.11% (145) Black or African American, 0.06% (1) Native American, 0.84% (15) Asian, 0.00% (0) Pacific Islander, 0.45% (8) from other races, and 0.95% (17) from two or more races. Hispanic or Latino of any race were 4.81% (86) of the population.

Of the 476 households, 30.5% had children under the age of 18; 60.7% were married couples living together; 8.2% had a female householder with no husband present and 24.6% were non-families. Of all households, 17.9% were made up of individuals and 5.5% had someone living alone who was 65 years of age or older. The average household size was 2.76 and the average family size was 3.14.

20.2% of the population were under the age of 18, 6.3% from 18 to 24, 25.6% from 25 to 44, 37.4% from 45 to 64, and 10.5% who were 65 years of age or older. The median age was 43.3 years. For every 100 females, the population had 152.9 males. For every 100 females ages 18 and older there were 166.0 males.

The Census Bureau's 2006–2010 American Community Survey showed that (in 2010 inflation-adjusted dollars) median household income was $65,568 (with a margin of error of +/− $16,290) and the median family income was $96,875 (+/− $31,126). Males had a median income of $61,250 (+/− $11,359) versus $33,393 (+/− $4,757) for females. The per capita income for the borough was $33,552 (+/− $5,866). About 4.9% of families and 4.6% of the population were below the poverty line, including 8.6% of those under age 18 and 9.7% of those age 65 or over.

=== 2000 census ===
As of the 2000 United States census there were 1,170 people, 425 households, and 323 families residing in the township. The population density was 12.2 inhabitants per square mile (4.7/km^{2}). There were 448 housing units at an average density of 4.7 per square mile (1.8/km^{2}). The racial makeup of the township was 98.03% White, 0.60% African American, 0.09% Native American, 0.34% Asian, 0.17% from other races, and 0.77% from two or more races. Hispanic or Latino of any race were 1.20% of the population.

There were 425 households, out of which 35.1% had children under the age of 18 living with them, 60.5% were married couples living together, 8.9% had a female householder with no husband present, and 24.0% were non-families. 19.1% of all households were made up of individuals, and 5.2% had someone living alone who was 65 years of age or older. The average household size was 2.75 and the average family size was 3.15.

In the township the population was spread out, with 25.8% under the age of 18, 7.3% from 18 to 24, 31.3% from 25 to 44, 27.9% from 45 to 64, and 7.7% who were 65 years of age or older. The median age was 38 years. For every 100 females, there were 99.0 males. For every 100 females age 18 and over, there were 101.9 males.

The median income for a household in the township was $59,271, and the median income for a family was $65,972. Males had a median income of $43,654 versus $31,765 for females. The per capita income for the township was $26,126. About 2.0% of families and 2.9% of the population were below the poverty line, including 2.9% of those under age 18 and 4.0% of those age 65 or over.

== Government ==
=== Local government ===
Woodland Township is governed under the Township form of New Jersey municipal government, one of 141 municipalities (of the 564) statewide that use this form, the second-most commonly used form of government in the state. The governing body is comprised of a three-member Township Committee, whose members are elected directly by the voters at-large in partisan elections to serve three-year terms of office on a staggered basis, with one seat coming up for election each year as part of the November general election in a three-year cycle. At an annual reorganization meeting, the Township Committee selects one of its members to serve as Mayor and another to serve as deputy mayor.

As of 2023, the members of the Woodland Township Committee are Mayor William DeGroff (R, term on committee and as mayor ends December 31, 2023), Deputy Mayor Mark J. Herndon (R, term on committee ends 2024; term as deputy mayor ends 2023) and Donna Mull (R, 2025).

In May 2022, Donna Mull was appointed to fill the seat expiring in December 2022 that had been held by Derrick Daniels until he resigned from office after moving out of Woodland Township.

=== Federal, state and county representation ===
Woodland Township is located in the 3rd Congressional District and is part of New Jersey's 8th state legislative district.

For the 119th United States Congress, New Jersey's 3rd congressional district is currently represented Herb Conaway (D, Delran Township). New Jersey is represented in the United States Senate by Democrats Cory Booker (Newark, term ends 2027) and Andy Kim (Moorestown, term ends 2031).

For the 2026–2027 session, the 8th legislative district of the New Jersey Legislature is represented in the New Jersey Senate by Latham Tiver (R, Southampton Township) and in the General Assembly by Anthony Angelozzi (D, Hammonton) and Andrea Katz (D, Chesterfield Township).

Burlington County is governed by a Board of County Commissioners comprised of five members who are chosen at-large in partisan elections to serve three-year terms of office on a staggered basis, with either one or two seats coming up for election each year; at an annual reorganization meeting, the board selects a director and deputy director from among its members to serve a one-year term. As of 2026, Burlington County's Commissioners are: Director Felicia Hopson (D, Willingboro Township, term as commissioner ends December 31, 2027; term as director ends 2026), Deputy Director Allison Eckel (D, Medford, term as commissioner ends 2028; term as deputy director ends 2026), Randy Brolo (D, Lumberton, 2026; elected to an unexpired term), Tyler Burrell (D, Delran Township, 2027) and Tom Pullion (D, Edgewater Park, 2026).

Burlington County's constitutional officers are Clerk Joanne Schwartz (D, Southampton Township, 2028), Sheriff James H. Kostoplis (D, Bordentown, 2028) and Surrogate Brian J. Carlin (D, Burlington Township, 2026).

=== Politics ===
United States presidential election results for Woodland Township 2024 2020 2016 2012 2008 2004
Year	Republican		Democratic		Third party(ies)	
Year	No.	%	No.	%	No.	%
2024	535	69.75%	225	29.34%	7	0.91%
2020	534	66.50%	248	30.88%	21	2.62%
2016	450	63.47%	218	30.75%	41	5.78%
2012	379	57.42%	275	41.67%	6	0.91%
2008	396	55.93%	300	42.37%	12	1.69%
2004	351	57.26%	254	41.44%	8	1.31%

As of March 2011, there were a total of 947 registered voters in Woodland Township, of which 153 (16.2% vs. 33.3% countywide) were registered as Democrats, 394 (41.6% vs. 23.9%) were registered as Republicans and 400 (42.2% vs. 42.8%) were registered as Unaffiliated. There were no voters registered to other parties. Among the township's 2010 Census population, 53.0% (vs. 61.7% in Burlington County) were registered to vote, including 66.4% of those ages 18 and over (vs. 80.3% countywide).

In the 2012 presidential election, Republican Mitt Romney received 379 votes here (57.0% vs. 40.2% countywide), ahead of Democrat Barack Obama with 275 votes (41.4% vs. 58.1%) and other candidates with 6 votes (0.9% vs. 1.0%), among the 665 ballots cast by the township's 962 registered voters, for a turnout of 69.1% (vs. 74.5% in Burlington County). In the 2008 presidential election, Republican John McCain received 396 votes here (55.4% vs. 39.9% countywide), ahead of Democrat Barack Obama with 300 votes (42.0% vs. 58.4%) and other candidates with 12 votes (1.7% vs. 1.0%), among the 715 ballots cast by the township's 953 registered voters, for a turnout of 75.0% (vs. 80.0% in Burlington County). In the 2004 presidential election, Republican George W. Bush received 351 votes here (57.0% vs. 46.0% countywide), ahead of Democrat John Kerry with 254 votes (41.2% vs. 52.9%) and other candidates with 8 votes (1.3% vs. 0.8%), among the 616 ballots cast by the township's 874 registered voters, for a turnout of 70.5% (vs. 78.8% in the whole county).

Gubernatorial election results for Woodland Township
Year	Republican		Democratic		Third party(ies)	
Year	No.	%	No.	%	No.	%
2025	413	68.60%	186	30.90%	3	0.50%
2021	395	77.76%	110	21.65%	3	0.59%
2017	226	59.47%	135	35.53%	19	5.00%
2013	310	72.94%	107	25.18%	8	1.88%
2009	307	61.40%	160	32.00%	33	6.60%
2005	220	56.70%	145	37.37%	23	5.93%

In the 2013 gubernatorial election, Republican Chris Christie received 310 votes here (70.6% vs. 61.4% countywide), ahead of Democrat Barbara Buono with 107 votes (24.4% vs. 35.8%) and other candidates with 8 votes (1.8% vs. 1.2%), among the 439 ballots cast by the township's 977 registered voters, yielding a 44.9% turnout (vs. 44.5% in the county). In the 2009 gubernatorial election, Republican Chris Christie received 307 votes here (60.9% vs. 47.7% countywide), ahead of Democrat Jon Corzine with 160 votes (31.7% vs. 44.5%), Independent Chris Daggett with 28 votes (5.6% vs. 4.8%) and other candidates with 5 votes (1.0% vs. 1.2%), among the 504 ballots cast by the township's 950 registered voters, yielding a 53.1% turnout (vs. 44.9% in the county).

United States Senate election results for Woodland Township1
Year	Republican		Democratic		Third party(ies)	
Year	No.	%	No.	%	No.	%
2024	473	66.25%	224	31.37%	17	2.38%
2018	370	65.60%	160	28.37%	34	6.03%
2012	355	58.01%	250	40.85%	7	1.14%
2006	222	52.48%	156	36.88%	45	10.64%

United States Senate election results for Woodland Township2
Year	Republican		Democratic		Third party(ies)	
Year	No.	%	No.	%	No.	%
2020	511	67.33%	227	29.91%	21	2.77%
2014	274	62.27%	145	32.95%	21	4.77%
2013	144	69.23%	58	27.88%	6	2.88%
2008	342	54.72%	266	42.56%	17	2.72%

== Education ==
The Woodland Township School District serves students in pre-kindergarten through eighth grade at Chatsworth Elementary School. As of the 2020–21 school year, the district, comprised of one school, had an enrollment of 120 students and 16.8 classroom teachers (on an FTE basis), for a student–teacher ratio of 7.1:1. In the 2016–2017 school year, Woodland had the 24th smallest enrollment of any school district in the state, with 147 students.

Public school students from Woodland Township in ninth through twelfth grades attend Seneca High School, located in Tabernacle Township, which also serves students from Shamong Township, Southampton Township and Tabernacle Townships. The school is part of the Lenape Regional High School District, which also serves students from Evesham Township, Medford Lakes, Medford Township and Mount Laurel Township. As of the 2020–21 school year, the high school had an enrollment of 1,073 students and 103.6 classroom teachers (on an FTE basis), for a student–teacher ratio of 10.4:1.

Students from Woodland Township, and from all of Burlington County, are eligible to attend the Burlington County Institute of Technology, a countywide public school district that serves the vocational and technical education needs of students at the high school and post-secondary level at its campuses in Medford and Westampton.

== Transportation ==
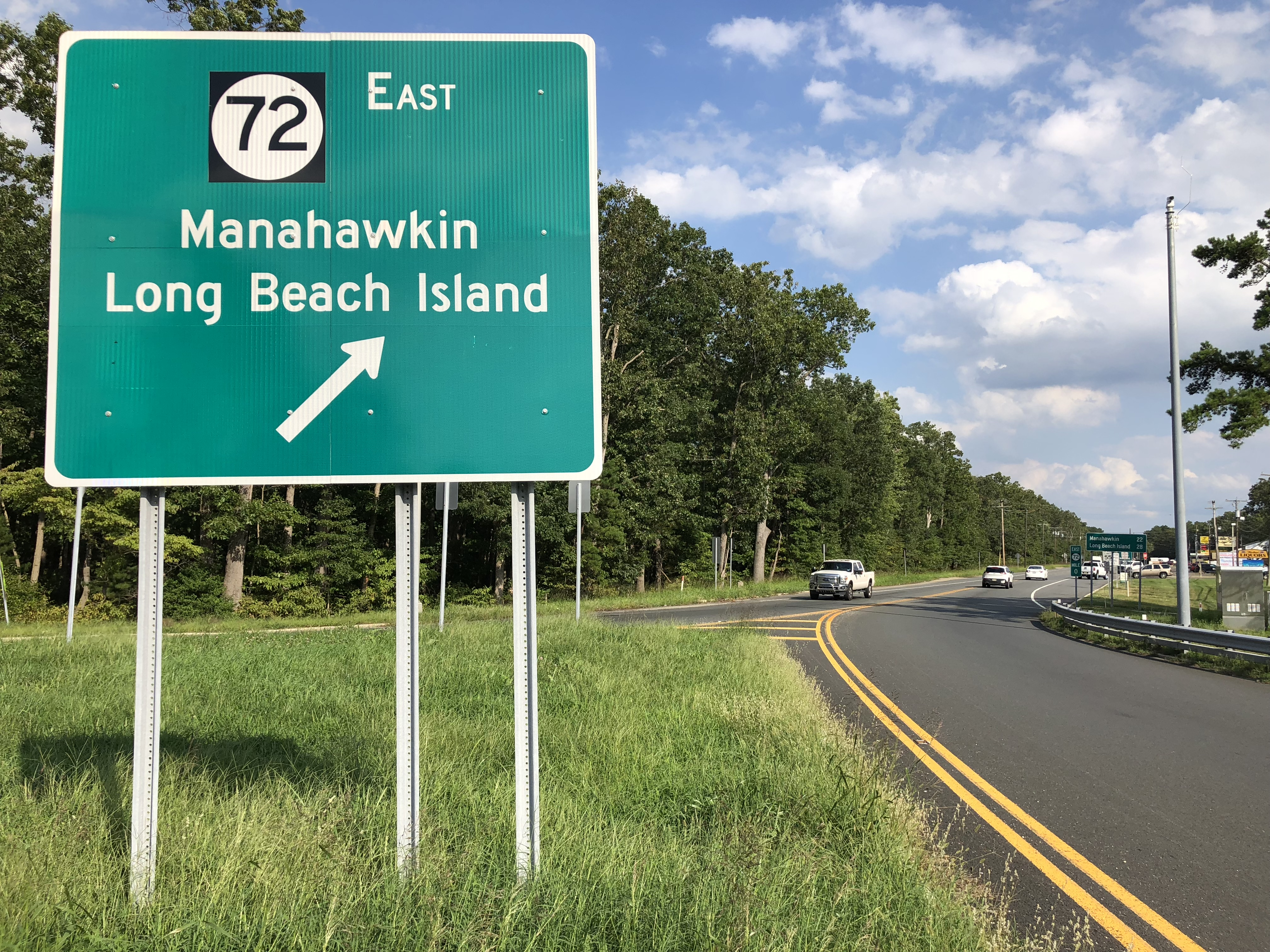
Route 72 at Route 70 in Woodland Township

As of May 2010, the township had a total of 73.73 miles (118.66 km) of roadways, of which 44.75 miles (72.02 km) were maintained by the municipality, 15.47 miles (24.90 km) by Burlington County and 13.51 miles (21.74 km) by the New Jersey Department of Transportation.

Two major state routes and two additional significant county routes pass through Woodland Township. Route 70 runs along the northwestern border while Route 72 travels from the northwest to the southeast. CR 532 and CR 563 also pass through and intersect with each other in Chatsworth. Four Mile Circle is a traffic circle located at the junction of Route 70, Route 72, Buddtown Road (County Route 644), and New Lisbon Road (County Route 646).

The Garden State Parkway is the closest limited-access highway. It is accessible via neighboring Lacey, Barnegat, Stafford, Little Egg Harbor and Bass River Townships.

Coyle Field, a small airport used as an air attack base for firefighting planes by the New Jersey Forest Fire Service, is located within the township.
