= Medford Lakes, New Jersey =

Borough in Burlington County, New Jersey, US

- Borough
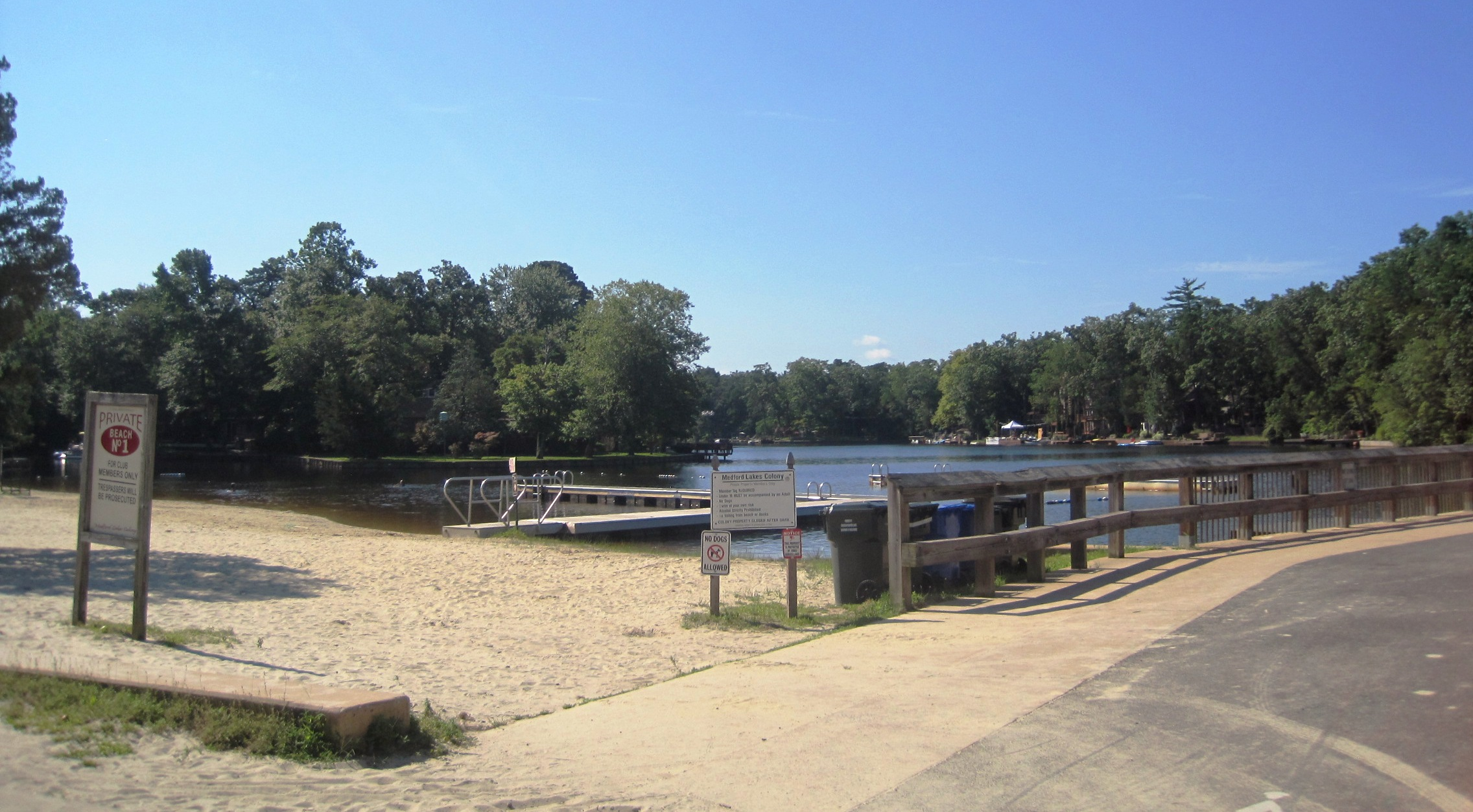
- Lower Aetna Lake
- Motto(s): Medford Lakes-in-the-pines, the year round summer playground
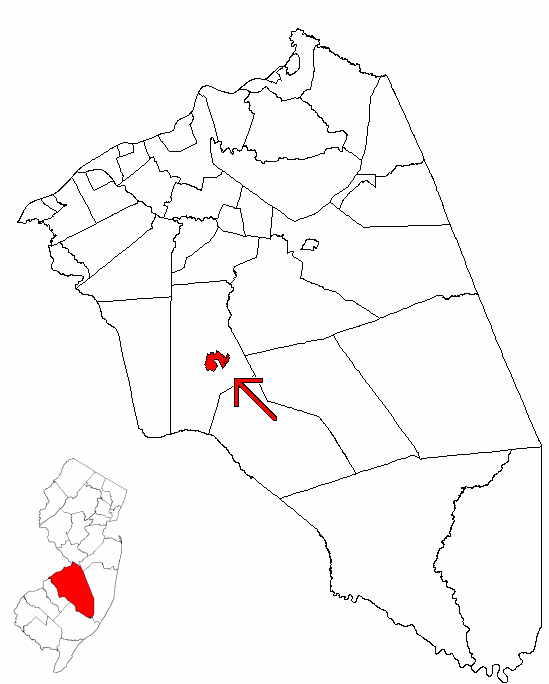
- Location of Medford Lakes in Burlington County highlighted in red with arrow (right). Inset map: Location of Burlington County in New Jersey highlighted in red (left).

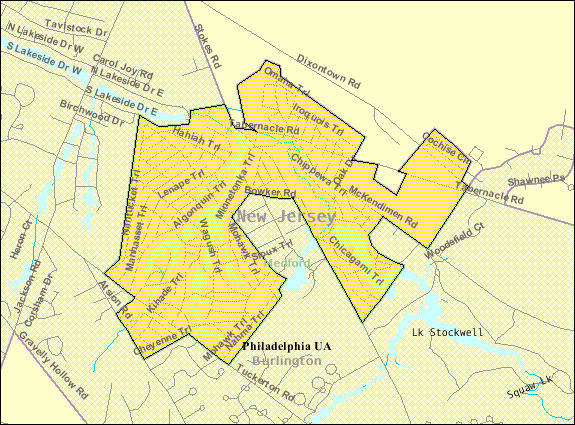
- Census Bureau map of Medford Lakes, New Jersey

- Location in Burlington County Location in New Jersey Location in the United States
- Coordinates: 39.853649°N 74.811665°W
- Country: United States
- State: New Jersey
- County: Burlington
- Incorporated: May 17, 1939
- Named for: Medford, Massachusetts

Government
  - Type: 1923 Municipal Manager Law
  - Body: Borough Council
  - Mayor: William R. Fields (term ends June 30, 2026)
  - Administrator: Robert J. Burton
  - Municipal clerk: Mark J. McIntosh

Area
  - Total: 1.27 sq mi (3.29 km^{2})
  - Land: 1.14 sq mi (2.95 km^{2})
  - Water: 0.13 sq mi (0.34 km^{2}) 10.24%
  - Rank: 476th of 565 in state 35th of 40 in county
- Elevation: 62 ft (19 m)

Population (2020)
  - Total: 4,264
  - Estimate (2023): 4,291
  - Rank: 405th of 565 in state 30th of 40 in county
  - Density: 3,741.2/sq mi (1,444.5/km^{2})
  - Rank: 178th of 565 in state 8th of 40 in county
- Time zone: UTC−05:00 (Eastern (EST))
  - Summer (DST): UTC−04:00 (Eastern (EDT))
- ZIP Code: 08055
- Area code: 609 exchanges: 654, 714, 953
- FIPS code: 3400545210
- GNIS feature ID: 0885295
- Website: www.medfordlakes.com

Medford Lakes is a borough in Burlington County, in the U.S. state of New Jersey. As of the 2020 United States census, the borough's population was 4,264, an increase of 118 (+2.8%) from the 2010 census count of 4,146, which in turn reflected a decline of 27 (−0.6%) from the 4,173 counted in the 2000 census. The borough, and all of Burlington County, is a part of the Philadelphia metropolitan area.

Medford Lakes was incorporated as a borough by an act of the New Jersey Legislature on May 17, 1939, from portions of Medford Township. The borough was named for Medford Township, which was named by a developer for Medford, Massachusetts.

The borough's 22 lakes and surrounding lake communities are within the boundaries of the New Jersey Pinelands Commission. The Medford Lakes Colony, a community association, manages the lakes and other recreational facilities. More than 10% of the borough's homes are log cabins.

== History ==
Prior to European colonization, the area now known as Medford Lakes was inhabited by the Lenni-Lenape people, who utilized the region's abundant natural resources, including its water bodies and forests, for survival and shelter.

European influence in the area began in the 17th century following English control over former Dutch territories. However, permanent European settlement did not commence until the 18th century. During this period, the region—characterized by its fertile soil and extensive forestland—remained sparsely populated and was primarily used for agriculture and lumbering activities.

During the American Revolutionary War, local industry played a role in the war effort. Charles Read’s Aetna Furnace contributed by producing cannonballs for the Continental Army, using locally sourced bog iron. Around the same time, John Haines constructed a saw and grist mill, marking the early stages of industrial activity in the area.

The 19th century saw continued exploitation of natural resources, particularly iron ore, which fueled local industry and expanded during the Industrial Revolution. Forges were established along the area’s waterways, and the population grew significantly during this period.

In 1927, the Medford Lakes Development Company was established, and in 1928, the Vaughn and Sons Lumber Company constructed the Colony Club Pavilion on land donated by the development company. The community became known for its distinctive log cabin architecture, utilizing imported cedar logs for construction. These log cabins, which featured strong insulation and prominent stone fireplaces, extended the usability of the area beyond the summer season, attracting visitors from Philadelphia and New York City.

In 1931, St. Mary of the Lakes Catholic Church, a single-story log cabin structure, was built and later added to the National Register of Historic Places in 2007.

Medford Lakes was officially incorporated as a borough on May 17, 1939, from portions of Medford Township. Since incorporation, the borough has worked to maintain the community's unique log cabin character, even as it has expanded and modernized.

Throughout the second half of the 20th century, Medford Lakes' population surged, transitioning from a summer resort to a year-round residential community.

On July 12, 2004, the borough suffered substantial damage due to flooding, caused by 7.26 inches of rainfall over 14 hours. This led to the breaking of several dams, including the Quogue Dam and the Lower and Upper Aetna Lake Dams, causing water levels to rise beyond 500-year flood elevations on portions of Ballinger Run.

Since 1931, the Canoe Carnival, an event featuring hand-crafted floats each supported by a maximum of two canoes, has taken place on Lower Aetna Lake during the first week of August. A king, queen, and court are announced before the event begins. Spectators then gather along the lake to view the floats, after which the winning float is announced.

== Geography ==
According to the U.S. Census Bureau, the borough had a total area of 1.293 square miles (3.348 km^{2}), including 1.162 square miles (3.008 km^{2}) of which is land and 0.131 square miles (0.340 km^{2}) of which is water (10.15%). The borough is an independent municipality surrounded entirely by Medford Township, making it part one of 21 pairs of "doughnut towns" in the state, where one municipality entirely surrounds another.

Medford Lakes is one of 56 South Jersey municipalities that are included within the New Jersey Pinelands National Reserve, a protected natural area of unique ecology covering 1,100,000 acres (450,000 ha), that has been classified as a United States Biosphere Reserve and established by Congress in 1978 as the nation's first National Reserve. All of the borough is included in the state-designated Pinelands Area, which includes portions of Burlington County, along with areas in Atlantic, Camden, Cape May, Cumberland, Gloucester and Ocean counties.

=== Climate ===
Climate data for Medford Lakes, New Jersey
Month	Jan	Feb	Mar	Apr	May	Jun	Jul	Aug	Sep	Oct	Nov	Dec	Year
Mean daily maximum °F (°C)	41 (5)	42 (6)	51 (11)	62 (17)	73 (23)	82 (28)	86 (30)	84 (29)	77 (25)	68 (20)	55 (13)	44 (7)	64 (18)
Mean daily minimum °F (°C)	23 (−5)	23 (−5)	32 (0)	37 (3)	48 (9)	57 (14)	60 (16)	60 (16)	53 (12)	41 (5)	32 (0)	26 (−3)	41 (5)
Source: Weatherbase

== Demographics ==
Historical population
Census	Pop.	Note	%±
1940	137		—
1950	461		236.5%
1960	2,876		523.9%
1970	4,792		66.6%
1980	4,958		3.5%
1990	4,462		−10.0%
2000	4,173		−6.5%
2010	4,146		−0.6%
2020	4,264		2.8%
2023 (est.)	4,291	▲	0.6%
Population sources: 1940–2000 1940–1990; 2000<2010 2020

=== 2020 census ===
As of the 2020 census, Medford Lakes had a population of 4,264. The median age was 43.4 years. 24.1% of residents were under the age of 18 and 17.5% of residents were 65 years of age or older. For every 100 females there were 95.4 males, and for every 100 females age 18 and over there were 93.2 males age 18 and over.

100.0% of residents lived in urban areas, while 0.0% lived in rural areas.

There were 1,522 households in Medford Lakes, of which 37.8% had children under the age of 18 living in them. Of all households, 67.0% were married-couple households, 9.7% were households with a male householder and no spouse or partner present, and 19.4% were households with a female householder and no spouse or partner present. About 17.0% of all households were made up of individuals and 9.0% had someone living alone who was 65 years of age or older.

There were 1,574 housing units, of which 3.3% were vacant. The homeowner vacancy rate was 0.9% and the rental vacancy rate was 0.0%.

Racial composition as of the 2020 census
Race	Number	Percent
White	3,971	93.1%
Black or African American	26	0.6%
American Indian and Alaska Native	6	0.1%
Asian	43	1.0%
Native Hawaiian and Other Pacific Islander	0	0.0%
Some other race	29	0.7%
Two or more races	189	4.4%
Hispanic or Latino (of any race)	122	2.9%

=== 2010 census ===
The 2010 United States census counted 4,146 people, 1,483 households, and 1,186 families in the borough. The population density was 3,569.5 per square mile (1,378.2/km^{2}). There were 1,543 housing units at an average density of 1,328.4 per square mile (512.9/km^{2}). The racial makeup was 97.32% (4,035) White, 0.46% (19) Black or African American, 0.17% (7) Native American, 0.96% (40) Asian, 0.00% (0) Pacific Islander, 0.39% (16) from other races, and 0.70% (29) from two or more races. Hispanic or Latino of any race were 1.69% (70) of the population.

Of the 1,483 households, 36.0% had children under the age of 18; 68.8% were married couples living together; 7.8% had a female householder with no husband present and 20.0% were non-families. Of all households, 16.3% were made up of individuals and 7.1% had someone living alone who was 65 years of age or older. The average household size was 2.80 and the average family size was 3.13.

26.3% of the population were under the age of 18, 5.7% from 18 to 24, 22.6% from 25 to 44, 30.7% from 45 to 64, and 14.7% who were 65 years of age or older. The median age was 42.3 years. For every 100 females, the population had 96.4 males. For every 100 females ages 18 and older there were 90.9 males.

The Census Bureau's 2006−2010 American Community Survey showed that (in 2010 inflation-adjusted dollars) median household income was $101,086 (with a margin of error of +/− $8,928) and the median family income was $105,563 (+/− $9,949). Males had a median income of $85,139 (+/− $26,197) versus $66,379 (+/− $13,826) for females. The per capita income for the borough was $48,789 (+/− $6,097). About 5.0% of families and 5.6% of the population were below the poverty line, including 7.7% of those under age 18 and none of those age 65 or over.

=== 2000 census ===
As of the 2000 United States census there were 4,173 people, 1,527 households, and 1,238 families residing in the borough. The population density was 3,463.1 inhabitants per square mile (1,337.1/km^{2}). There were 1,555 housing units at an average density of 1,290.5 per square mile (498.3/km^{2}). The racial makeup of the borough was 98.32% White, 0.43% African American, 0.12% Native American, 0.48% Asian, 0.10% from other races, and 0.55% from two or more races. Hispanic or Latino of any race were 0.98% of the population.

There were 1,527 households, out of which 36.3% had children under the age of 18 living with them, 70.8% were married couples living together, 7.6% had a female householder with no husband present, and 18.9% were non-families. 15.1% of all households were made up of individuals, and 6.0% had someone living alone who was 65 years of age or older. The average household size was 2.73 and the average family size was 3.04.

In the borough the age distribution of the population shows 25.6% under the age of 18, 5.0% from 18 to 24, 27.8% from 25 to 44, 29.2% from 45 to 64, and 12.4% who were 65 years of age or older. The median age was 40 years. For every 100 females, there were 95.9 males. For every 100 females age 18 and over, there were 92.4 males.

The median income for a household in the borough was $77,536, and the median income for a family was $83,695. Males had a median income of $58,854 versus $36,831 for females. The per capita income for the borough was $31,382. About 1.1% of families and 2.1% of the population were below the poverty line, including 1.1% of those under age 18 and 2.9% of those age 65 or over.

== Government ==
=== Local government ===
The Borough of Medford Lakes is governed under the 1923 Municipal Manager Law form of New Jersey municipal government, one of seven municipalities (of the 564) statewide that use this form. The governing body is comprised of five members, who are elected at-large in non-partisan elections to serve four-year terms on a staggered basis, with either two or three seats up for vote in even-numbered years as part of the May municipal election. The borough council was expanded from three to five seats, with the two additional council seats added as part of the May 2010 election in which there were two seats up for a four-year term and two others for a two-year term.

As of 2025, members of the borough council are Mayor William R. Fields (term of office on council ends June 30, 2028; term as mayor ends 2026), Deputy Mayor Dennis P. O'Neill (term on council and as deputy mayor ends 2026), Councilman Matthew R. Bailey (2028), Thomas J. Cranston (2026) and Gerald Yowell (2028).

In February 2021, the borough council appointed Dennis P. O'Neill to fill the seat expiring in June 2022 that had been held by Robert D. Hanold Sr. until his death the previous month. O'Neill served on an interim basis until the May 2021 municipal election, when he was elected to serve the balance of the term of office.

In March 2015, the borough council selected Kathy Merkh to fill the vacant seat of Deputy Mayor Jeff Fitzpatrick, who had submitted his resignation from office the previous month. Gary Miller was chosen to fill the vacant position of deputy mayor.

=== Federal, state and county representation ===
Medford Lakes is located in the 3rd Congressional District and is part of New Jersey's 8th state legislative district.

For the 119th United States Congress, New Jersey's 3rd congressional district is currently represented Herb Conaway (D, Delran Township). New Jersey is represented in the United States Senate by Democrats Cory Booker (Newark, term ends 2027) and Andy Kim (Moorestown, term ends 2031).

For the 2026–2027 session, the 8th legislative district of the New Jersey Legislature is represented in the New Jersey Senate by Latham Tiver (R, Southampton Township) and in the General Assembly by Anthony Angelozzi (D, Hammonton) and Andrea Katz (D, Chesterfield Township).

Burlington County is governed by a Board of County Commissioners comprised of five members who are chosen at-large in partisan elections to serve three-year terms of office on a staggered basis, with either one or two seats coming up for election each year; at an annual reorganization meeting, the board selects a director and deputy director from among its members to serve a one-year term. As of 2026, Burlington County's Commissioners are: Director Felicia Hopson (D, Willingboro Township, term as commissioner ends December 31, 2027; term as director ends 2026), Deputy Director Allison Eckel (D, Medford, term as commissioner ends 2028; term as deputy director ends 2026), Randy Brolo (D, Lumberton, 2026; elected to an unexpired term), Tyler Burrell (D, Delran Township, 2027) and Tom Pullion (D, Edgewater Park, 2026).

Burlington County's constitutional officers are Clerk Joanne Schwartz (D, Southampton Township, 2028), Sheriff James H. Kostoplis (D, Bordentown, 2028) and Surrogate Brian J. Carlin (D, Burlington Township, 2026).

=== Politics ===
United States presidential election results for Medford Lakes 2024 2020 2016 2012 2008 2004
Year	Republican		Democratic		Third party(ies)	
Year	No.	%	No.	%	No.	%
2024	1,160	46.44%	1,313	52.56%	25	1.00%
2020	1,334	45.31%	1,551	52.68%	59	2.00%
2016	1,135	46.50%	1,193	48.87%	113	4.63%
2012	1,194	49.44%	1,197	49.57%	24	0.99%
2008	1,208	49.01%	1,223	49.61%	34	1.38%
2004	1,302	52.21%	1,168	46.83%	24	0.96%

As of March 2011, there were a total of 3,033 registered voters in Medford Lakes, of which 749 (24.7% vs. 33.3% countywide) were registered as Democrats, 1,009 (33.3% vs. 23.9%) were registered as Republicans and 1,275 (42.0% vs. 42.8%) were registered as Unaffiliated. There were no voters registered to other parties. Among the borough's 2010 Census population, 73.2% (vs. 61.7% in Burlington County) were registered to vote, including 99.2% of those ages 18 and over (vs. 80.3% countywide).

In the 2012 presidential election, Democrat Barack Obama received 1,197 votes here (49.3% vs. 58.1% countywide), ahead of Republican Mitt Romney with 1,194 votes (49.2% vs. 40.2%) and other candidates with 24 votes (1.0% vs. 1.0%), among the 2,429 ballots cast by the borough's 3,142 registered voters, for a turnout of 77.3% (vs. 74.5% in Burlington County). In the 2008 presidential election, Democrat Barack Obama received 1,223 votes here (49.3% vs. 58.4% countywide), ahead of Republican John McCain with 1,208 votes (48.7% vs. 39.9%) and other candidates with 34 votes (1.4% vs. 1.0%), among the 2,482 ballots cast by the borough's 3,007 registered voters, for a turnout of 82.5% (vs. 80.0% in Burlington County). In the 2004 presidential election, Republican George W. Bush received 1,302 votes here (52.0% vs. 46.0% countywide), ahead of Democrat John Kerry with 1,168 votes (46.6% vs. 52.9%) and other candidates with 24 votes (1.0% vs. 0.8%), among the 2,505 ballots cast by the borough's 3,014 registered voters, for a turnout of 83.1% (vs. 78.8% in the whole county).

Gubernatorial election results for Medford Lakes
Year	Republican		Democratic		Third party(ies)	
Year	No.	%	No.	%	No.	%
2025	1,040	46.30%	1,201	53.47%	5	0.22%
2021	1,015	52.78%	898	46.70%	10	0.52%
2017	757	47.14%	809	50.37%	40	2.49%
2013	941	67.70%	425	30.58%	24	1.73%
2009	956	56.33%	650	38.30%	91	5.36%
2005	838	54.66%	627	40.90%	68	4.44%

In the 2013 gubernatorial election, Republican Chris Christie received 941 votes here (66.9% vs. 61.4% countywide), ahead of Democrat Barbara Buono with 425 votes (30.2% vs. 35.8%) and other candidates with 24 votes (1.7% vs. 1.2%), among the 1,406 ballots cast by the borough's 3,107 registered voters, yielding a 45.3% turnout (vs. 44.5% in the county). In the 2009 gubernatorial election, Republican Chris Christie received 956 votes here (55.8% vs. 47.7% countywide), ahead of Democrat Jon Corzine with 650 votes (37.9% vs. 44.5%), Independent Chris Daggett with 74 votes (4.3% vs. 4.8%) and other candidates with 17 votes (1.0% vs. 1.2%), among the 1,713 ballots cast by the borough's 3,061 registered voters, yielding a 56.0% turnout (vs. 44.9% in the county).

United States Senate election results for Medford Lakes1
Year	Republican		Democratic		Third party(ies)	
Year	No.	%	No.	%	No.	%
2024	1,076	44.24%	1,334	54.85%	22	0.90%
2018	1,147	51.53%	974	43.76%	105	4.72%
2012	1,164	50.99%	1,102	48.27%	17	0.74%
2006	892	54.36%	725	44.18%	24	1.46%

United States Senate election results for Medford Lakes2
Year	Republican		Democratic		Third party(ies)	
Year	No.	%	No.	%	No.	%
2020	1,371	47.57%	1,464	50.80%	47	1.63%
2014	784	53.59%	644	44.02%	35	2.39%
2013	439	52.14%	390	46.32%	13	1.54%
2008	1,228	53.95%	1,016	44.64%	32	1.41%

== Education ==
Students in pre-kindergarten through eighth grade are educated by the Medford Lakes School District.As of the 2023–24 school year, the district, comprised of two schools, had an enrollment of 487 students and 46.3 classroom teachers (on an FTE basis), for a student–teacher ratio of 10.5:1. Schools in the district (with 2023–24 enrollment data from the National Center for Education Statistics) are Nokomis School with 162 students in grades PreK–2 and Neeta School with 325 students in grades 3–8.

Public school students from Medford Lakes in ninth through twelfth grades attend Shawnee High School, located in Medford Township. Shawnee is part of the Lenape Regional High School District, a regional high school district in Burlington County, New Jersey that serves the eight municipalities of Evesham Township, Medford Lakes, Medford Township, Mount Laurel, Shamong Township, Southampton Township, Tabernacle Township and Woodland Township. As of the 2023–24 school year, the high school had an enrollment of 1,418 students and 114.0 classroom teachers (on an FTE basis), for a student–teacher ratio of 12.4:1.

Students from Medford Lakes, and from all of Burlington County, are eligible to attend the Burlington County Institute of Technology, a countywide public school district that serves the vocational and technical education needs of students at the high school and post-secondary level at its campuses in Medford and Westampton.

== Transportation ==
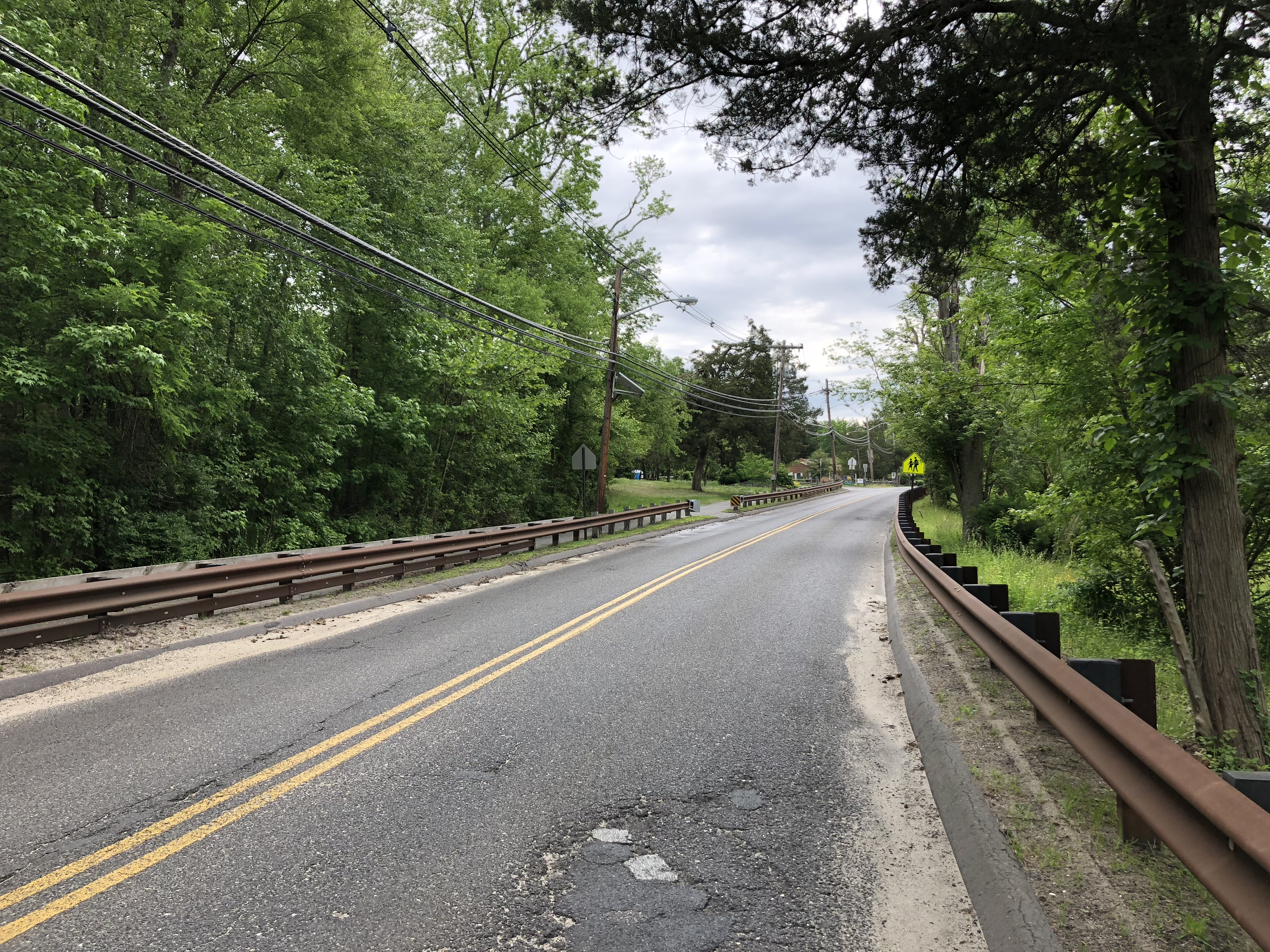
County Route 532 in Medford Lakes

As of May 2010, the borough had a total of 27.42 miles (44.13 km) of roadways, of which 25.13 miles (40.44 km) were maintained by the municipality and 2.29 miles (3.69 km) by Burlington County.

The main roads serving Medford Lakes are County Route 532 and County Route 541. CR 541 travels north–south, while CR 532 head east from its western terminus at CR 541 within the borough.

== Notable people ==
People who were born in, residents of, or otherwise closely associated with Medford Lakes include:

- Brian Earl (born 1976), former professional basketball player who is the head men's basketball coach at The College of William & Mary
- Dan Earl (born 1974), head men's basketball coach for the VMI Keydets
- George Makris (1920–2005), 18th head coach of the Temple Owls football team
- Gregg Rakoczy (born 1965), NFL football player for the Cleveland Browns
- Liz Tchou (born 1966), former field hockey defender who played on the US women's team that finished fifth at the 1996 Summer Olympics in Atlanta
