= Chatsworth, New Jersey =

Populated place in Burlington County, New Jersey, US

- Unincorporated community
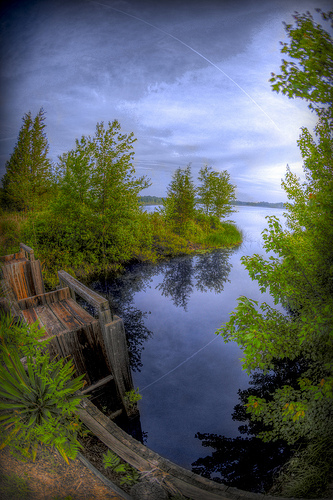
- Chatsworth Lake

- Location of Chatsworth in Burlington County (Inset: Location of county within the state of New Jersey) Chatsworth (New Jersey) Chatsworth (the United States)
- Coordinates: 39°49′03″N 74°32′06″W
- Country: United States
- State: New Jersey
- County: Burlington
- Township: Woodland
- Elevation: 95 ft (29 m)
- Time zone: UTC-5 (Eastern (EST))
  - Summer (DST): UTC-4 (EDT)
- ZIP code: 08019
- GNIS feature ID: 875379

Chatsworth is an unincorporated community located within Woodland Township in Burlington County, New Jersey, United States. The area is served as United States Postal Service ZIP Code 08019. The New Jersey Central's Blue Comet passenger train was wrecked here in 1939. Chatsworth has been called "Capital of the Pine Barrens."

According to the 2020–2024 American Community Survey 5-year estimates, ZIP Code Tabulation Area (ZCTA) 08019 had a population of 907.

== Climate ==
The climate in this area is characterized by hot, humid summers and generally mild to cool winters. According to the Köppen Climate Classification system, Chatsworth has a humid subtropical climate, abbreviated "Cfa" on climate maps.
