= Warren Grove, New Jersey =

Populated place in Ocean County, New Jersey, US

- Unincorporated community
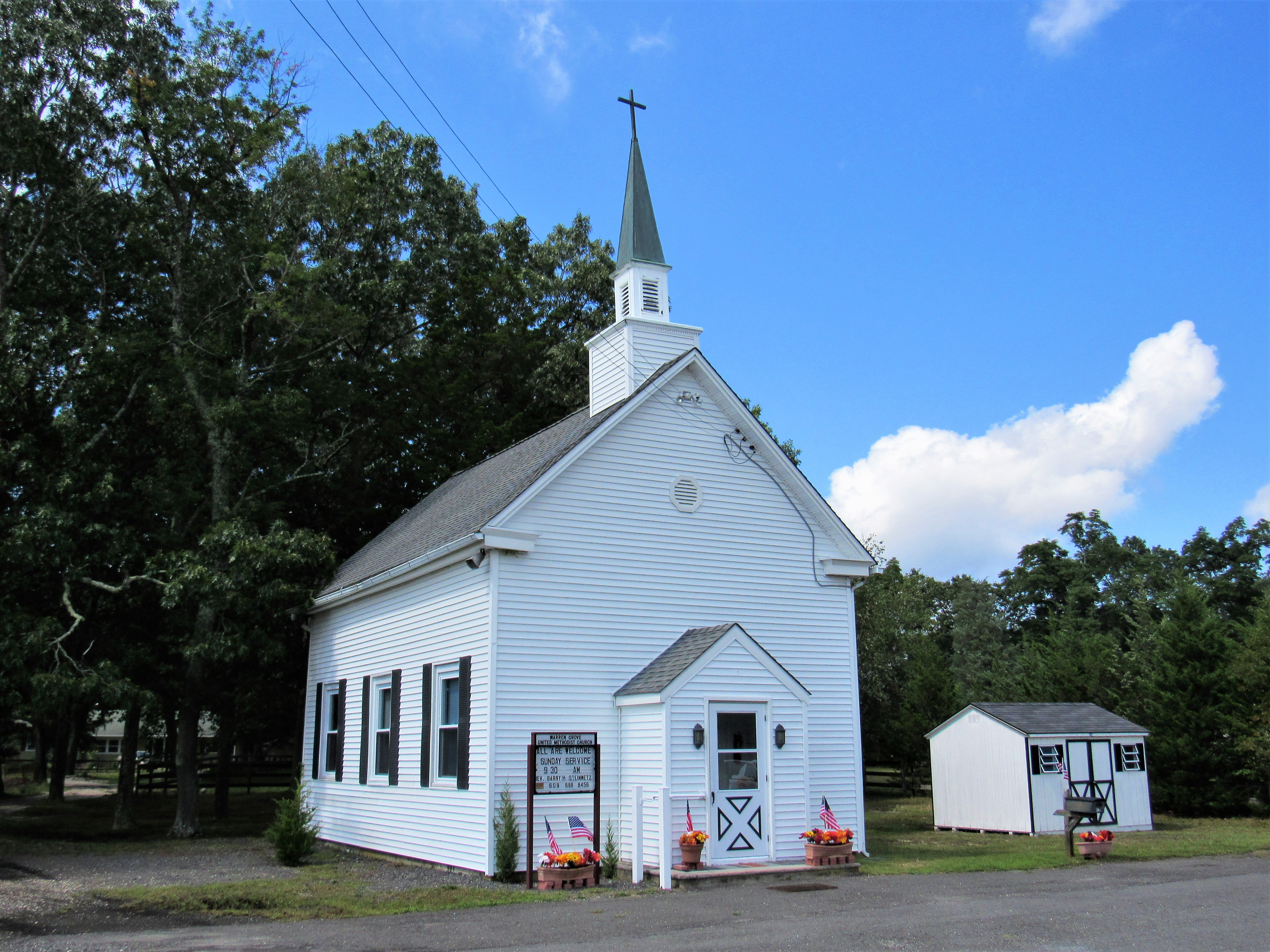
- Warren Grove United Methodist Church

- Warren Grove's location in Ocean County (Inset: Ocean County in New Jersey) Warren Grove, New Jersey (New Jersey) Warren Grove, New Jersey (the United States)
- Coordinates: 39°44′47″N 74°22′14″W
- Country: United States
- State: New Jersey
- County: Ocean
- Township: Stafford
- Elevation: 98 ft (30 m)
- ZIP Code: 08005 - Barnegat
- GNIS feature ID: 0881544

Warren Grove is an unincorporated rural community that is a part of Stafford Township, Barnegat Township and Little Egg Harbor Township in Ocean County, in the U.S. state of New Jersey. Its location in the heart of the Pine Barrens makes it one of the most secluded and remote corners of the state.

Warren Grove is the namesake of the nearby Warren Grove Gunnery Range, though the range is actually located in adjacent Bass River Township. Warren Grove is also home to the Pygmy Pine Plains, populated by dwarf pitch pine and blackjack oaks.
