= Whiting, New Jersey =

Place in Ocean County, New Jersey, US

- Unincorporated community
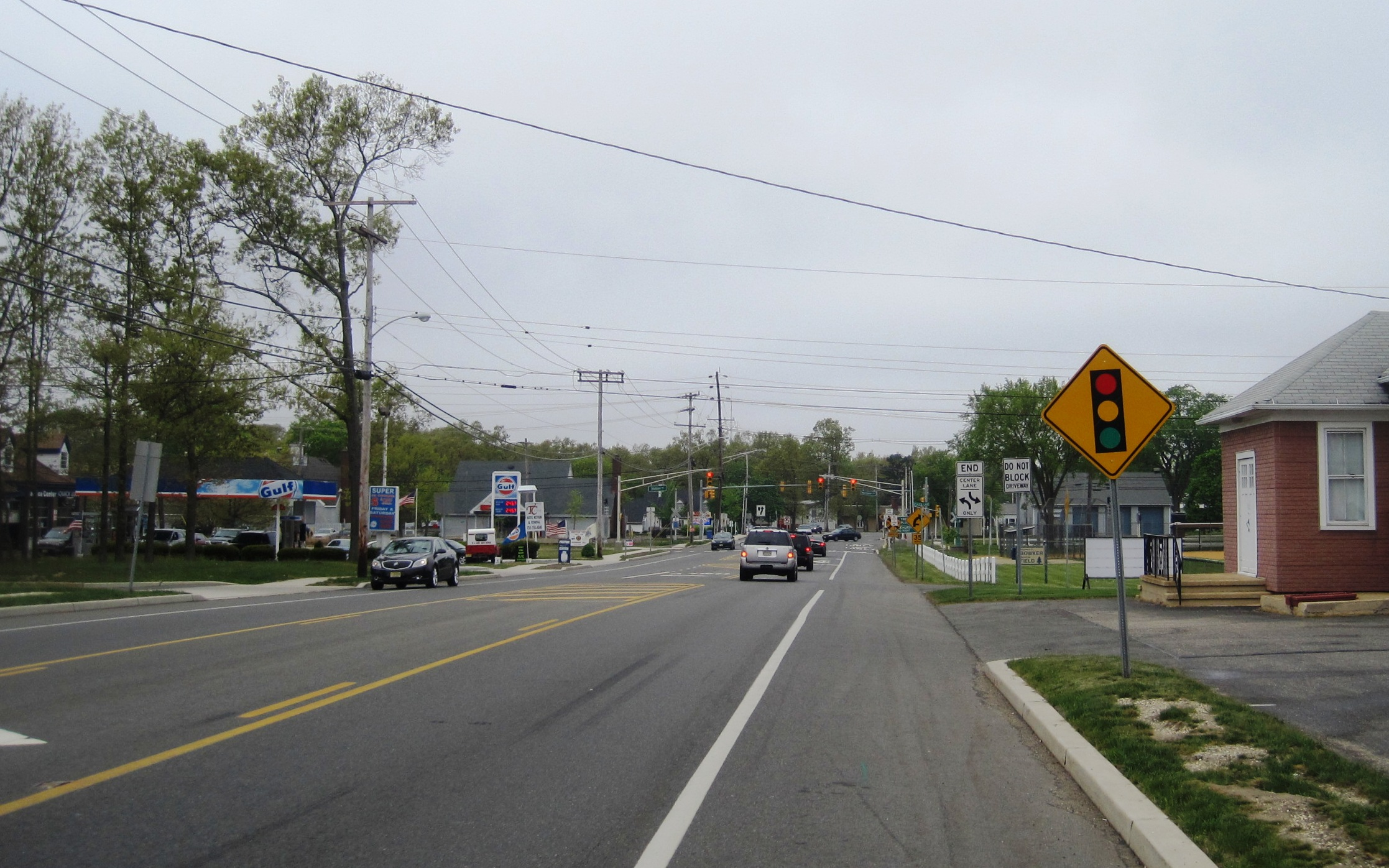
- Center of Whiting

- Whiting's location in Ocean County (Inset: Ocean County in New Jersey) Whiting, New Jersey (New Jersey) Whiting, New Jersey (the United States)
- Coordinates: 39°57′16″N 74°22′43″W
- Country: United States
- State: New Jersey
- County: Ocean
- Township: Manchester
- Elevation: 180 ft (55 m)
- ZIP code: 08759
- GNIS feature ID: 0881807

Whiting is an unincorporated community located on the west side of Manchester Township in Ocean County, New Jersey, United States. It is in the Eastern Standard time zone with an elevation of 180 ft. It is home to various retirement communities. The ZIP Code Tabulation Area for the Whiting 08759 ZIP code has a population of 33,180 as of the 2019 Population Estimates Program from the United States Census Bureau. The majority of the township's population of 43,070 lives here.

Whiting was once a station stop on the southern branch of the Central Railroad of New Jersey, a line known for the Blue Comet express. Whiting Station was located at the intersection of Diamond Road and Station Road. The town and the train station were named after Nathaniel Whiting's lumber mill. The highest point in town is Halfmoon Hill, with an elevation of 205 feet, with the next highest hill being Crow's Hill, where you can still see Hangar 1 and the site of the Hindenburg Disaster and tracer fire at night from firing ranges on Fort Dix.

== Industries in Whiting ==
Tehophilus T. Price had built the Tuckerton Railroad with yards in Whiting and Tuckerton. Here he built Wye where the Tuckerton Railroad, Pennsylvania Railroad, and Central Jersey Railroad could interchange tracks. Later replaced by a turntable. Just off of the train yard was the Lancewood Hotel. Also in town in the 1920s was Nature's Rest Nudist Colony, built on the old Jersey Pines Poultry Farm.

Harry L. Neal leased the property to Eliha J. Granger of the Philadelphia office of the Hydraulic Press Brick Company (incorporated in 1866 in St. Louis, first president steps down in 1905 to travel) for $.10 per cubic yard of clay with a minimum rent of $250 a month. Under the stipulation, he built an operation that will produce 5,000 'stiff mud’ bricks a day to be delivered to a siding on the Tuckerton Railroad where they would have their own box car.

Originally bought or taken from the Leni Lenape this acreage was owned by General John Lacey to provide enough water sources to mine bog iron to be processed on location into pig iron and brought back to his Ferrago Forge on Forge Pond (Bamber Lake).

== Fire Company 33 ==
The Whiting Volunteer Fire Company No.1 was incorporated in 1937. It was the only fire company in Manchester Township until 1955. The first fire engine was kept in the garage at Allegrinia's Bar (a popular Italian restaurant that was open from the 30s-70s), located at the end of Lakewood Avenue. Their first fire station was built and located on Central Avenue, between Manchester Blvd. and Cherry Street, which housed their first new fire truck, which was a 1947 Ward La France.

The building was basically a two-bay garage with no other rooms; the trucks had to be pulled out for any function. A wood-burning stove in the rear of one bay supplied heat to the building. They had a large metal ring that was hit with a sledgehammer to alert the members of a fire call.

In the past, Whiting was one of the first communities in the country to elect an African-American judge, Andrew M. Battles.

== Roosevelt City ==
A plan of mobster Joseph Parisi (of Murder Inc. through Louis "Lepke" Buchalter and later by Albert "Mad Hatter" Anastasia, and later the Gambino Mafia and the garbage industry in NYC), and his brother Frank (Roosevelt City Land Development Company), during a time of many failed or outright land development schemes during the 1920s, planned to build a city to rival that of his home in NYC.

On maps in the Ocean County Clerk office, you can find his planned community built on the old General John Lacey lot. On the map, it shows where the rich neighborhood, the poor, the churches, city hall, factories, and train stations were to be built. All built alongside the Tuckerton Railroad, which would connect to rails going to Atlantic City, New York City, and Philadelphia. The roads were all laid out, including a central grand boulevard named after Franklin Delano Roosevelt with a fountain (which to this day is the only road not paved). One church can be seen on the map to be on Block 6, Lot 66 right behind the planned city hall. He sold about eight concrete houses and 20 acres (8.1 ha) to a married couple of masseuses from his Brooklyn neighborhood, which Doctor's Pond is named after.

The masseuses opened a nudist colony called Nature's Rest that burned down in the 1970s. At Doctor's Pond, you can see the bridge and foundation of the pump house that served water to the Jersey Pines Poultry Farm and Nature's Rest nudist colony. A spring water company was established there too. In the field at the dirt section of Newark Ave. you can still find the foundation of the chicken coop, horse stable, house, water tower (windmill that sat on top is behind Sloan's Market now), outhouses, arboretum, and hotel. A local story says the locals didn't like their kids looking at them. Then, in 1976, Scarborough developed Fox Hollow, and soon later, Roosevelt City developed beyond Parisi's efforts. Parisi and the masseuses owned the Arsarco property and its checkered past, along with many others.

== Joe Portash ==
Joe Portash, a Democrat member of Mayor Hague's machine in Jersey City moved south and became a Republican Ocean County Freeholder. Soon he met Robert J. Schmertz of the soon-to-be Leisure Technology that developed the Leisure Villages in Manchester when he was mayor and still holding a position in the county. Schmertz owned the Boston Celtics. Schmertz bribed him $25,000 to approve his land deal on the county level. A year later, Portash is indicted for extortion and conflict of interest. Turning evidence against Schmertz, Portash put him in jail, and when they used his testimony against himself, he set a US Supreme Court precedent that you cannot incriminate yourself while providing testimony against another. Afterward, they removed him as mayor of Manchester, elected his wife, and made him town administrator.

By 1990, he had stolen over $20 million from the town when he died in Bridgton, Maine, on Long Lake where the town veterinarian signed his death certificate. Two weeks after his closed casket funeral, his twin brother would be seen in Harrison on top of the lake where his house was. The township went into receivership, and the FBI took control of the town. Their investigations stopped before reaching the county level.

After working with Schmertz and Leisure Technology, Portash joined forces with Miroslav “Michael” Kokes, who built the company's first active adult community, Crestwood Village in Whiting, starting in 1964. Portash had Harry Wright Lake carved out of the Davenport Branch just opposite the old Tuckerton railroad on Lake Road, made two new ponds behind it, and cleared out for parking. Though Portash stopped Lacey Road from joining Lake Road at a county zoning meeting, traffic had to go past Kokes shopping plaza on Rt. 530, a move that would add fifteen minutes of travel between Bamber Lake and Whiting that could have been two minutes. Kokes would build six more villages and his family continues to plan more.

== Leni Lenape ==
The original natives of this area have left their mark. They would have acre lots with a post oak with three trunks surrounded by a series of Pitch Pine, Scarlet Oak, and Sassafras trees with forked tops encircling them on one side and a post oak with a single oak on the other side, surrounded again by forked trees. On their properties, they would bend trees like lightning bolts or stunt them and make swaying bonsai-like trees out of the pitch pine. Their lots would have wintergreen, scrub oak patches for acorns to eat, and mountain laurel hedges.

== Education ==
Manchester Township provides K–12 education, with Whiting School being the only one in the area that offers education up to the fifth grade.

Parochial education is offered by St. Mary Academy near Manahawkin, a K-8 school of the Roman Catholic Diocese of Trenton, is in the area. From 1997, until 2019 it operated as All Saints Regional Catholic School and was collectively managed by five churches, with one being St. Elizabeth Ann Seton Church in Whiting. In 2019 St. Mary Church in Barnegat Township took over control of the school, which remained on the same Manahawkin campus, and changed its name. The other churches no longer operate the school but may still send students there. Also, Monsignor Donovan and Saint John's School are offered.

== Notable people ==
People who were born in, residents of, or otherwise closely associated with Whiting include:

- Joe Cinderella (1927–2012), jazz guitarist.
- Julia Scotti, transgender stand-up comedian
