= J. Frederic McCurdy =

James Frederic McCurdy (1847–1935), born in Chatham, New Brunswick, was Professor of Oriental Languages, University College, Toronto, Canada. He studied at the University of New Brunswick, then at the University of Göttingen and University of Leipzig, then Princeton Theological Seminary under William Henry Green. His main area of study was the origins of ancient Hebrew and linguistic archeology. He was one of the scholars who held to the view that the ancient Israelites already had an advanced literary culture at the time of the migration from Canaan to Egypt.

== Works ==
- Aryo-Semitic speech: a study in linguistic archaeology 1881
- History, Prophecy and the Monuments of Israel and the Nations 1914

Articles

- contributions to the Jewish Encyclopedia 1912.
- Celebration of the fiftieth anniversary of the appointment of Professor William Henry Green as an instructor in Princeton Theological Seminary: Essay Dr Green's contribution to semitic scholarship
