= County Route 524 (New Jersey) =

County highway in New Jersey, U.S.

County Route 524
- CR 524 highlighted in red, CR 524A in magenta, CR 524 Spur in blue

Route information
- Length: 39.90 mi (64.21 km)
- Tourist routes: Upper Freehold Historic Farmland Byway

Major junctions
- West end: US 206 / CR 533 in Hamilton Township
- I-195 in Hamilton Township; US 130 in Hamilton Township; I-195 in Robbinsville Township/Upper Freehold Township; US 9 in Freehold Township; Route 34 in Wall Township; Route 35 in Wall Township
- East end: Route 71 in Spring Lake Heights

Location
- Country: United States
- State: New Jersey
- Counties: Mercer, Monmouth

Highway system
- County routes in New Jersey; 500-series routes
← CR 523	→ CR 525

County Route 524 (CR 524) is a county highway in the U.S. state of New Jersey. The highway extends 39.90 miles (64.21 km) from the White Horse Circle (U.S. Route 206 [US 206] and CR 533) in Hamilton Township, Mercer County, to Route 71 in Spring Lake Heights, Monmouth County.

There are a few concrete bridge heads which showed that the section of CR 524 between the White Horse Circle and Allentown was in the 1930s part of Route 37.

== Route description ==
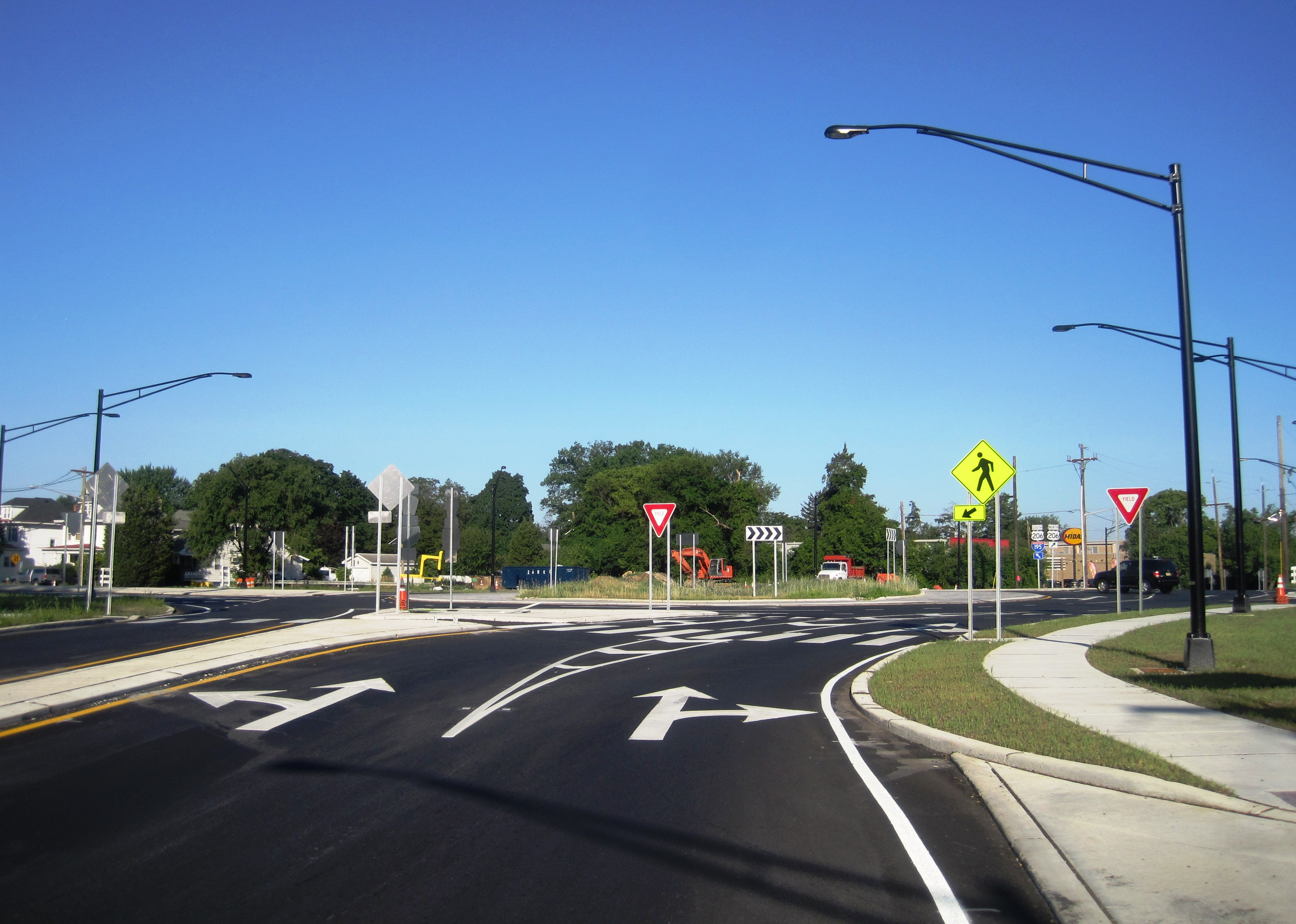
CR 524's western terminus at the White Horse Circle at US 206 and CR 533 in Hamilton Township

CR 524 begins at the modified White Horse Circle in the community of White Horse in Hamilton, Mercer County, where the route intersects with US 206 and White Horse Avenue (CR 533). From the circle, the route heads east on two-lane undivided South Broad Street, which continues towards Trenton as part of US 206 west of the White Horse Circle. CR 524 passes homes before reaching an interchange with Interstate 195 (I-195), where the route is a four-lane divided highway maintained by the New Jersey Department of Transportation (NJDOT) with a wide median. After this, the road becomes undivided and county-maintained again, passing more suburban homes and becoming a divided highway briefly again at an intersection with Boulevard/Kim Valley Road in business areas. CR 524 narrows back into a two-lane undivided road turns southeast and crosses Conrail Shared Assets Operations' Robbinsville Industrial Track line near industrial establishments. The road passes more businesses as it reaches an intersection with Church Street (CR 609) and South Broad Street (CR 672) in the community of Yardville-Groveville. At this point, CR 672 continues on South Broad Street while CR 524 heads east on Yardville–Allentown Road, intersecting with Route 156 and US 130. From this point, the road continues through a mix of residences and woodland before passing over the New Jersey Turnpike (I-95). Past this bridge, the route heads into agricultural areas with some woods and homes.

CR 524 continues into Upper Freehold Township in Monmouth County and runs through wooded areas of residences before crossing into Allentown. The route intersects with South Main Street (CR 28) and turns northeast on Old York Road, passing more homes. After running near Connies Millpond, CR 524 intersects with High Street (CR 539) and runs concurrently with that route. The combined route continues on Old York Road and intersects with Church Street (CR 526). CR 524/CR 539 briefly runs concurrently with CR 526 until it splits by heading east on Waker Avenue. The road leaves Allentown for Upper Freehold and enters farmland as it intersects with CR 526 Spur. A short distance later, CR 524/CR 539 reaches an interchange with I-195. At this point, the name of the road becomes Stagecoach Road and it forms the border between Robbinsville Township, Mercer County to the west and Upper Freehold Township, Monmouth County, to the east briefly before CR 539 splits from CR 524 by heading north on Old York Road and CR 524 turns east on Stone Tavern Road before fully entering Upper Freehold Township, retaining the Stagecoach Road name. CR 524 continues through open agricultural areas with a few homes, intersecting with Imlaystown–Hightstown Road (CR 43). The road heads into a mix of farms, woods, and residences as it enters Millstone Township and comes to the intersection with Rising Sun Tavern Road (CR 571). At this point, CR 571 joins CR 524 and the two routes make a sharp turn to the southeast into wooded residential areas, turning east at an intersection with Red Valley Road/Spring Road. CR 571 splits from CR 524 by turning south on Millstone Road, while CR 524 heads northeast and enters areas of farmland. The route heads into wooded areas of homes before reaching an intersection with Monmouth Road (CR 537), at which point CR 524 joins CR 537. The two routes head northeast along Monmouth Road, forming the border between Millstone Township to the northwest and Freehold Township to the southeast. Upon crossing the intersection with Smithburg Road/Siloam Road (CR 527), the road forms the border between Manalapan Township and Freehold Township as passes near farms and homes.

CR 524 splits from CR 537 by turning east on Elton–Adelphia Road, and CR 537 continues northeast on Monmouth Road, fully entering Freehold Township. On this road, the route passes through agricultural areas before heading through suburban residential subdivisions, continuing on Elton–Adelphia Road as it comes to intersections with Jackson Mills Road (CR 23) and US 9. From here, CR 524 continues heading southeast onto Elton–Adelphia Road and heads into Howell Township and passes more housing developments. The road continues becomes simply CR 524 into residential areas with a few farms before CR 524A splits off, running farther south of CR 524. The route heads east through more wooded areas of residences before crossing the inactive Freehold Industrial Track railroad line operated by the Delaware and Raritan River Railroad and entering Farmingdale. The road passes homes and businesses before coming to the intersection with Colts Neck Road (CR 35), where CR 524 turns southeast onto Main Street. In the center of Farmingdale, It intersects with Asbury Avenue (CR 547). CR 547 joins CR 524 from the north and the two routes pass businesses before crossing the Southern Secondary railroad line operated by the Delaware & Raritan River Railroad. The road makes a turn to the south and crosses back into Howell, intersecting with Belmar Boulevard (CR 18). The route continues south through wooded areas of homes and businesses on Lakewood-Farmingdale Road before it intersects with Squankum-Yellowbrook Road (CR 524A) from the west.

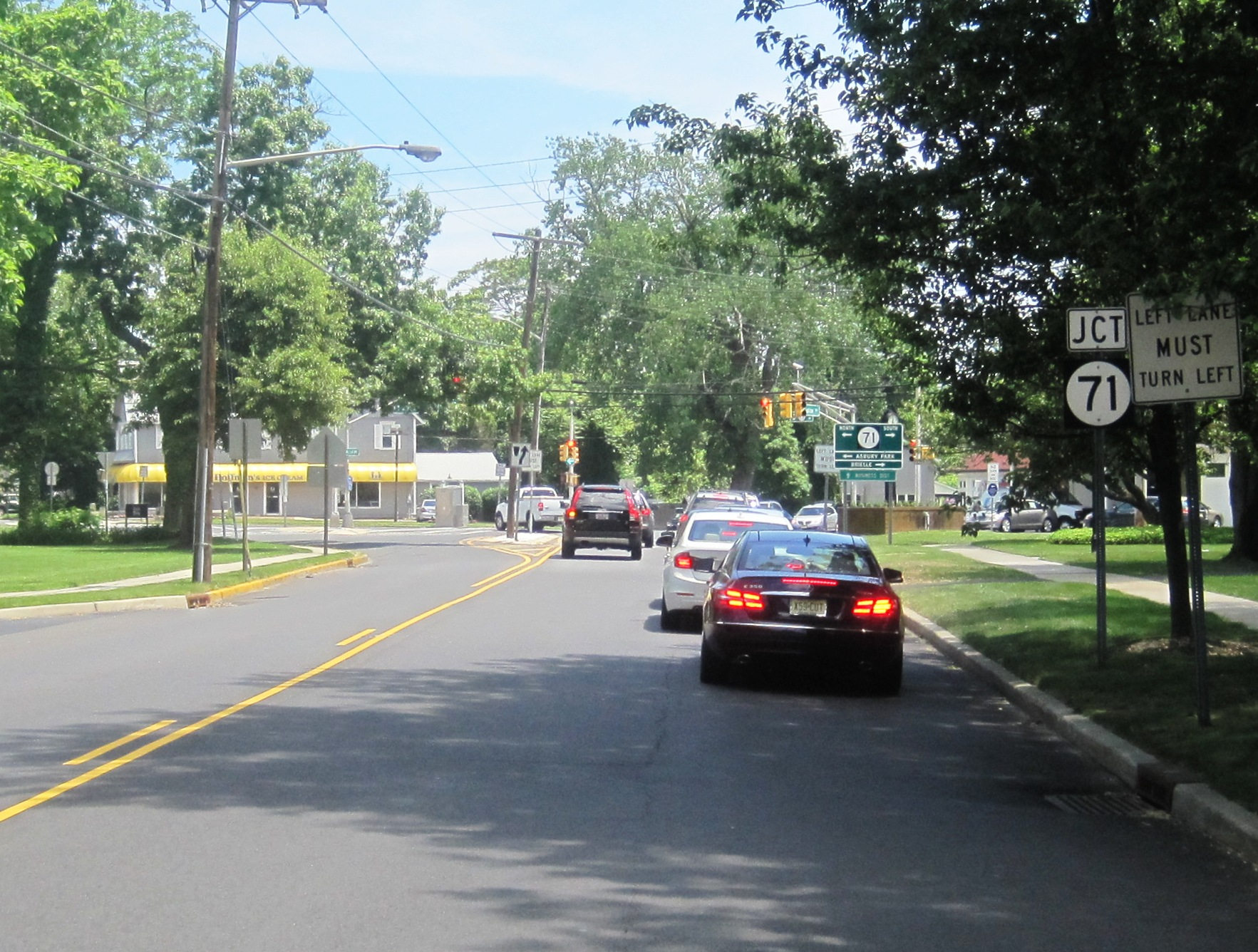
Eastern terminus of CR 524 at Route 71 in Spring Lake Heights

At this point, CR 547 splits from CR 524 by heading south on Lakewood-Farmingdale Road with CR 524 heading east on Allaire Road and entering densely forested areas of Allaire State Park, passing under I-195 before entering Wall Township. The road turns southeast as it passes Allaire Village and intersects with West 18th Avenue (CR 30). As CR 524 approaches the Garden State Parkway, the route splits from Allaire Road by heading southeast on Atlantic Avenue and crossing over the parkway, with Allaire Road becoming a dead end road on either side of the Garden State Parkway. After the bridge, CR 524 turns northeast onto Allenwood Road, with CR 524 Spur continuing on Atlantic Avenue. The route turns east again and resumes on Allaire Road, passing homes before intersecting with Route 34 at the Allenwood Circle. The road continues through a mix of fields, woods, and residences before passing Osborne Pond. CR 524 reaches intersections with Warren Avenue (CR 47) and Route 35 in business areas before crossing into Spring Lake Heights. The route passes several homes before coming to its eastern terminus at the intersection with Route 71, where the road continues east as Ludlow Avenue towards the Atlantic Ocean.

== History ==
From Our House Tavern, a short distance west of Farmingdale, to Squankum, was maintained as part of the Farmingdale and Squankum Turnpike, chartered in 1866. Its charter allowed it to extend its turnpike to Manasquan.

Between 1927 and 1953, the road between Trenton and Allentown was once signed as part of Route 37. Concrete bridge heads confirm this, and USGS topographical maps indicate that the road was signed as such until at least 1948.

== Major intersections ==
County	Location	mi	km	Destinations	Notes
Mercer	Hamilton Township	0.00	0.00	US 206 (South Broad Street) – Trenton, Bordentown CR 533 north (White Horse Avenue) – Mercerville	Western terminus; White Horse Circle; southern terminus of CR 533
Mercer	Hamilton Township	0.61	0.98	I-195 to I-95 / N.J. Turnpike – Trenton, Jersey Shore	Exit 2 on I-195
Mercer	Hamilton Township	2.09	3.36	Route 156 to US 130 south – Yardville, Bordentown	Former US 130
Mercer	Hamilton Township	2.18	3.51	US 130 north – New Brunswick	
Monmouth	Allentown	6.52	10.49	CR 539 south (High Street)	Western end of CR 539 concurrency
Monmouth	Allentown	6.81	10.96	CR 526 west (Church Street) – Trenton	Western end of CR 526 concurrency
Monmouth	Allentown	6.83	10.99	CR 526 east (Waker Avene)	Eastern end of CR 526 concurency
Monmouth	Upper Freehold Township	7.37	11.86	CR 526 Spur south to CR 526 east / CR 539 south – Cream Ridge	Northern terminus of CR 526 Spur
Monmouth	Upper Freehold Township	7.74	12.46	I-195 to I-95 / N.J. Turnpike – Trenton, Shore Points	Exit 8 on I-195
Monmouth	Upper Freehold Township	7.91	12.73	CR 539 north (Old York Road) – Hightstown	Eastern end of CR 539 concurency
Monmouth	Millstone Township	14.74	23.72	CR 571 north (Rising Sun Tavern Road) – Roosevelt	Western end of CR 571 concurrency
Monmouth	Millstone Township	15.84	25.49	CR 571 south (Millstone Road)	Eastern end of CR 571 concurrency
Monmouth	Millstone–Freehold township line	20.00	32.19	CR 537 west (Monmouth Road) – Fort Dix, Mount Holly	Western end of CR 537 concurrency
Monmouth	Millstone–Manalapan– Freehold township tripoint	20.41	32.85	CR 527 (Smithburg Road/Siloam Road)	Forms the municipal tripoint Smithburg
Monmouth	Manalapan–Freehold township line	21.23	34.17	CR 537 east (Monmouth Road) – Freehold Borough	Eastern end of CR 537 concurrency
Monmouth	Freehold Township	25.21	40.57	US 9	
Monmouth	Howell Township	28.92	46.54	CR 524A south	Northern terminus of CR 524A
Monmouth	Farmingdale	30.79	49.55	CR 547 north (Asbury Avenue)	Western end of CR 547 concurrency
Monmouth	Howell Township	33.05	53.19	CR 524A north (Squankum Yellowbrook Road) CR 547 south (Lakewood Farmingdale Road) to I-195 / G.S. Parkway	Eastern end of CR 547 concurrency; southern terminus of CR 524
Monmouth	Wall Township	36.08	58.07	CR 524 Spur east (Atlantic Avenue)	Western terminus of CR 524 Spur
Monmouth	Wall Township	36.63	58.95	Route 34 – Brielle, Matawan	Allenwood Circle
Monmouth	Wall Township	38.84	62.51	Route 35 – Belmar, Brielle	
Monmouth	Spring Lake Heights	39.90	64.21	Route 71 – Asbury Park, Brielle	Eastern terminus
1.000 mi = 1.609 km; 1.000 km = 0.621 mi: Concurrency terminus; Incomplete access

== Special and suffixed routes ==
=== County Route 524A ===
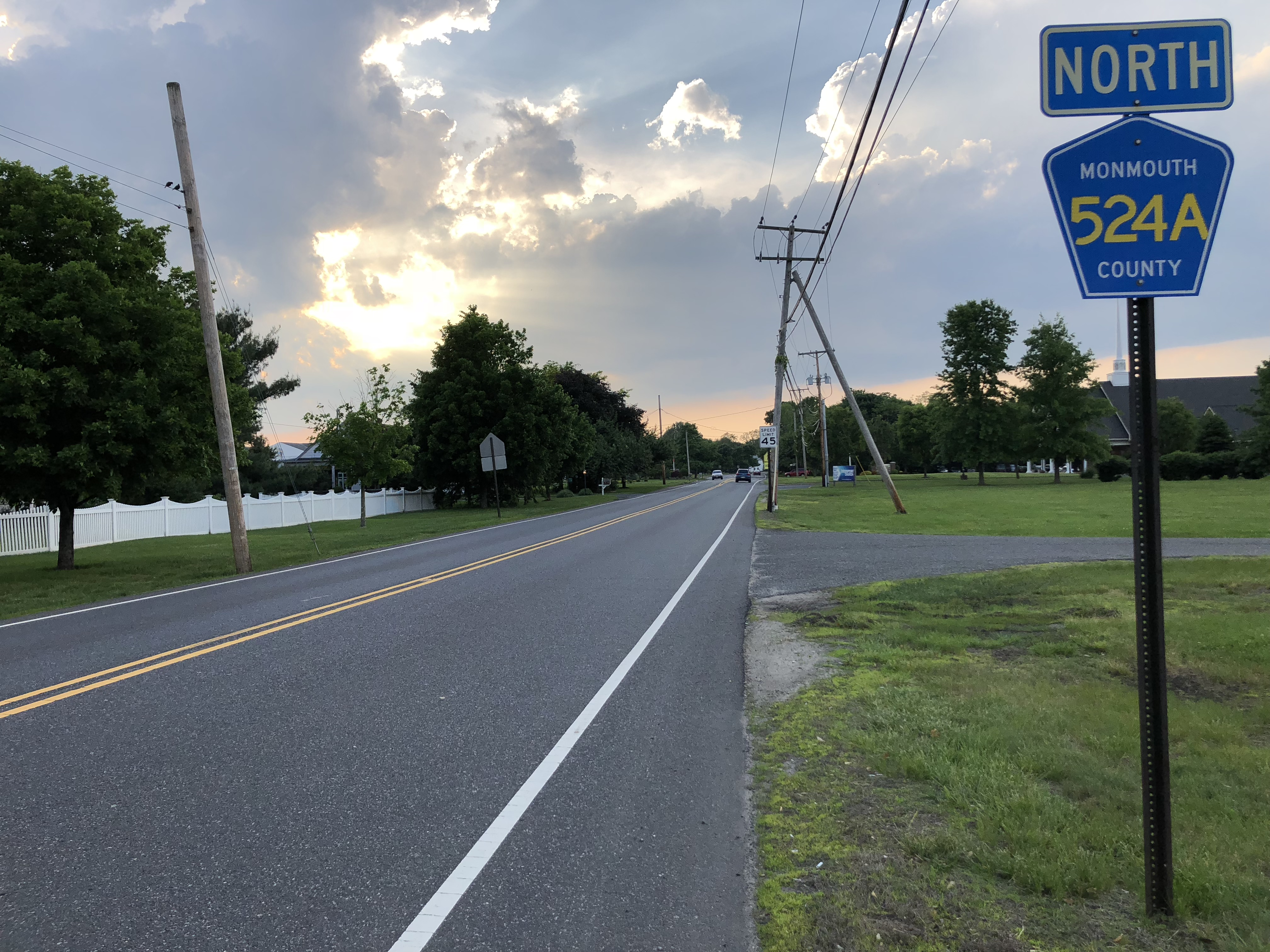
View west along CR 524A at Southard Avenue in Howell

County Route 524A
- Location: Howell Township
- Length: 3.74 mi (6.02 km)

County Route 524A (also known as County Route 524 Alternate or CR 524A) is a county highway in Howell Township. The highway extends 3.74 miles (6.02 km) as Squankum-Yellowbrook Road in Howell Township. The highway acts as a by-pass of the borough of Farmingdale. For CR 524A's entire run, the speed limit is 45 mph (72 km/h). Though the state's straight line diagram of the route states that the road is east–west, CR 524A is signed by Monmouth County as a north–south route.

CR 524A begins at a signalized intersection with its parent route, CR 524 west of Farmingdale. It turns to the south-east, the direction it follows for most of its existence. At mile marker 1.63, CR 524A intersects with Southard Avenue (CR 21), near Howell High School. It passes Howell Golf Course, crosses the abandoned right of way of the Freehold and Jamesburg Agricultural Railroad and comes to an end at its parent route, CR 524 and CR 547 just north of exit 31 on I-195.

Major intersections
The entire route is in Howell Township, Monmouth County.

mi	km	Destinations	Notes
0.00	0.00	CR 524	
3.74	6.02	CR 524 west / CR 547 north (Main Street) CR 524 east (Allaire Road) – Allaire State Park CR 547 south (Lakewood Farmingdale Road) to I-195 / G.S. Parkway	
1.000 mi = 1.609 km; 1.000 km = 0.621 mi

=== County Route 524 Spur ===
County Route 524 Spur
- Location: Wall Township–Manasquan
- Length: 3.39 mi (5.46 km)

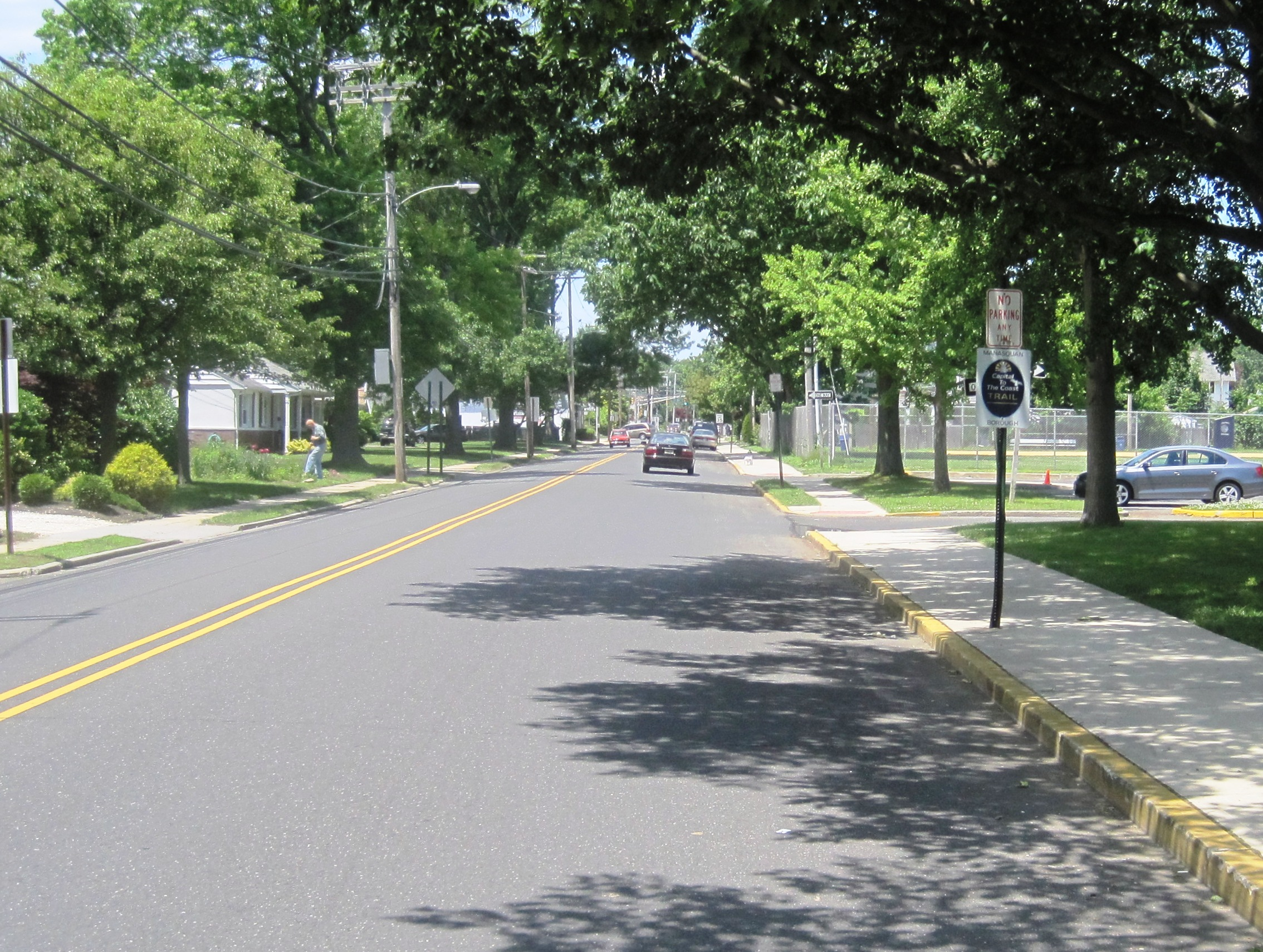
CR 524 Spur westbound at its eastern terminus in Manasquan

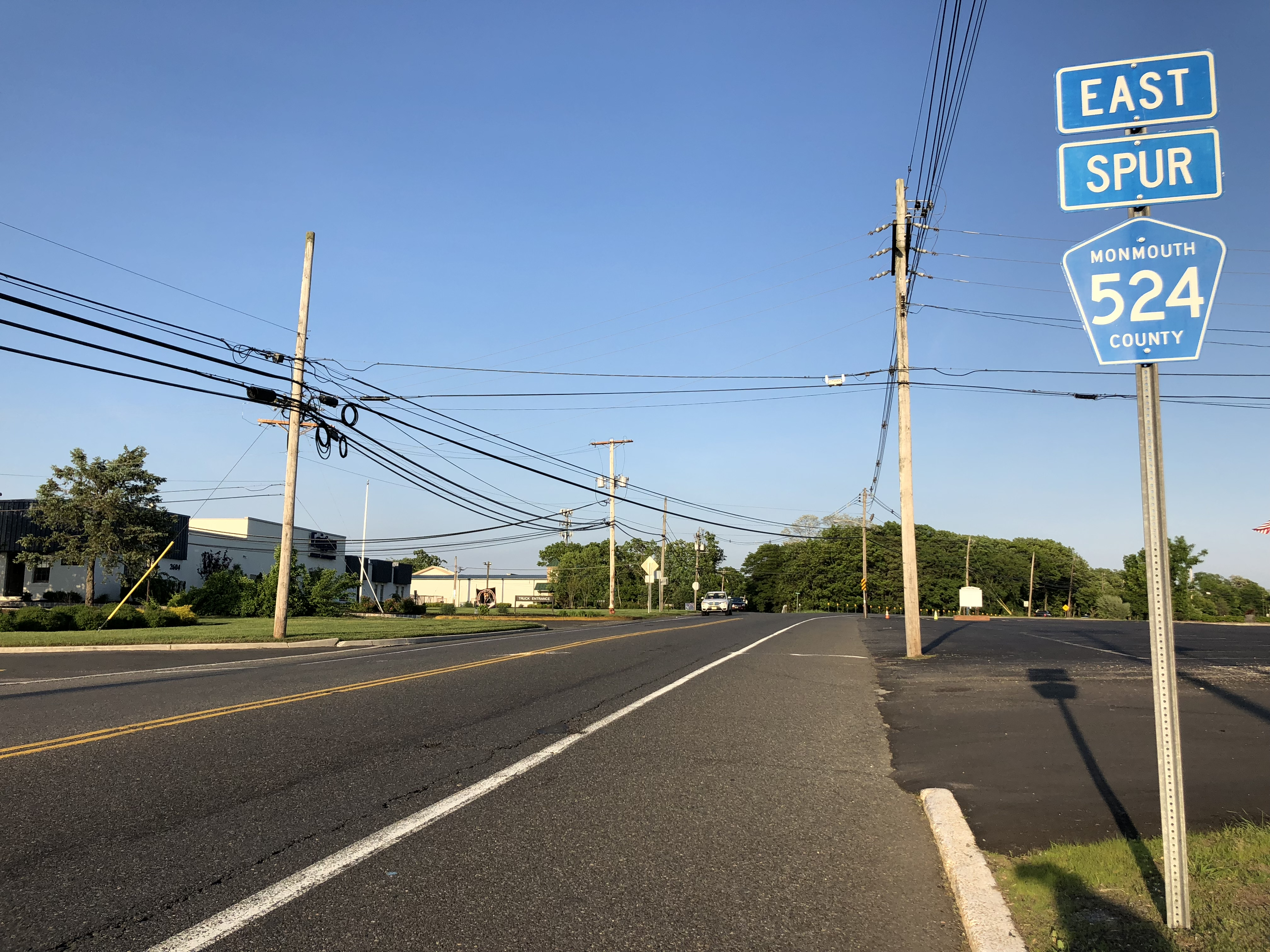
View east along CR 524 Spur at Route 34 in Wall

County Route 524 Spur is a spur route of CR 524 from Wall Township to Manasquan. The highway extends 3.39 miles (5.46 km) from Allenwood Road (CR 524) in Wall Township to Broad Street (CR 20) in Manasquan and is known as Atlantic Avenue for its entire length.

CR 524 Spur begins at an intersection with CR 524 just east of its overpass over the Garden State Parkway in southern Wall Township. It heads southeast for about a one-half mile (0.80 km) before reaching a skewed intersection with Allenwood-Lakewood Road (CR 21) and Ramshorn Drive. CR 524 Spur turns east and has a partial cloverleaf interchange with Route 34. After a slight curve at the intersection with Tiltons Corner Road, CR 524 Spur continues east past numerous businesses and an apartment complex. A traffic circle is at its intersection with Route 35. Past the traffic circle, the route enters Manasquan and ends at a T-intersection with Broad Street, next to Manasquan High School.

CR 524 Spur formerly continued north on Broad Street and Sea Girt Avenue (CR 49) to end at Route 71 on the border of Manasquan and Sea Girt.

Major intersections
The entire route is in Monmouth County.

Location	mi	km	Destinations	Notes
Wall Township	0.00	0.00	CR 524 (Allenwood Road)	
Wall Township	0.87	1.40	Route 34 – Point Pleasant, Matawan	Interchange
Wall Township	2.43	3.91	Route 35 to G.S. Parkway – Belmar, Brielle	Manasquan Circle
Manasquan	3.39	5.46	CR 20 (Broad Street)	
1.000 mi = 1.609 km; 1.000 km = 0.621 mi
