= Interstate 195 (New Jersey) =

Highway in New Jersey

Interstate 195
- James J. Howard Interstate Highway; Central Jersey Expressway
- I-195 highlighted in red

Route information
- Auxiliary route of I-95
- Maintained by NJDOT
- Length: 34.17 mi (54.99 km)
- Existed: 1968–present
- NHS: Entire route

Major junctions
- West end: I-295 / Route 29 in Hamilton Township
- US 206 in Hamilton; US 130 in Hamilton; I-95 Toll / N.J. Turnpike in Robbinsville Township; CR 539 on Robbinsville–Upper Freehold township line; CR 537 on Millstone–Jackson township line; US 9 in Howell Township
- East end: G.S. Parkway / Route 138 / Route 34 in Wall Township

Location
- Country: United States
- State: New Jersey
- Counties: Mercer, Monmouth, Ocean

Highway system
- Interstate Highway System; Main; Auxiliary; Suffixed; Business; Future; New Jersey State Highway Routes; Interstate; US; State; Scenic Byways
← Route 187	→ US 202

Interstate 195 (I-195) is an auxiliary route of the Interstate Highway System located in the US state of New Jersey. Its western end is at I-295 and Route 29 just south of Trenton in Hamilton Township, Mercer County, while its eastern end is at the Garden State Parkway, Route 138, and Route 34 in Wall Township, Monmouth County. I-195 is 34.17 miles (54.99 km) in length. The route is mostly a four-lane highway that mainly runs through agrarian and wooded areas in Central Jersey. It has an interchange with the New Jersey Turnpike (I-95) in Robbinsville Township and serves as a main access road to New Jersey's state capital of Trenton, the Horse Park of New Jersey, Six Flags Great Adventure, and the Jersey Shore. I-195 is occasionally referred to as the Central Jersey Expressway. On April 6, 1988, President Ronald Reagan signed H.R. 4263 naming I-195 in New Jersey the James J. Howard Interstate Highway, in honor of the late James J. Howard.

The current I-195 was initially planned as a toll road called the Trenton–Asbury Park Expressway in the 1950s. In the 1960s, it became two proposed freeways Route 37 and Route 38 that were to cross the central part of the state. A compromise was reached for a single freeway between Trenton and Belmar which would get Interstate Highway funding as I-195. It was built in several stages during the 1970s and 1980s. There once existed a plan to extend the I-195 designation west to the interchange between the Pennsylvania Turnpike (I-276) and I-95 in Bristol Township, Pennsylvania, but it was decided to extend the I-295 designation west and south, along existing I-95 instead.

The highway, along with the Route 138 extension, was built to also be an evacuation route in times of emergency, such as before Hurricane Sandy, when the eastbound lanes were reversed all the way from the coast to the New Jersey Turnpike (I-95) to accommodate for mass evacuations.

== Route description ==
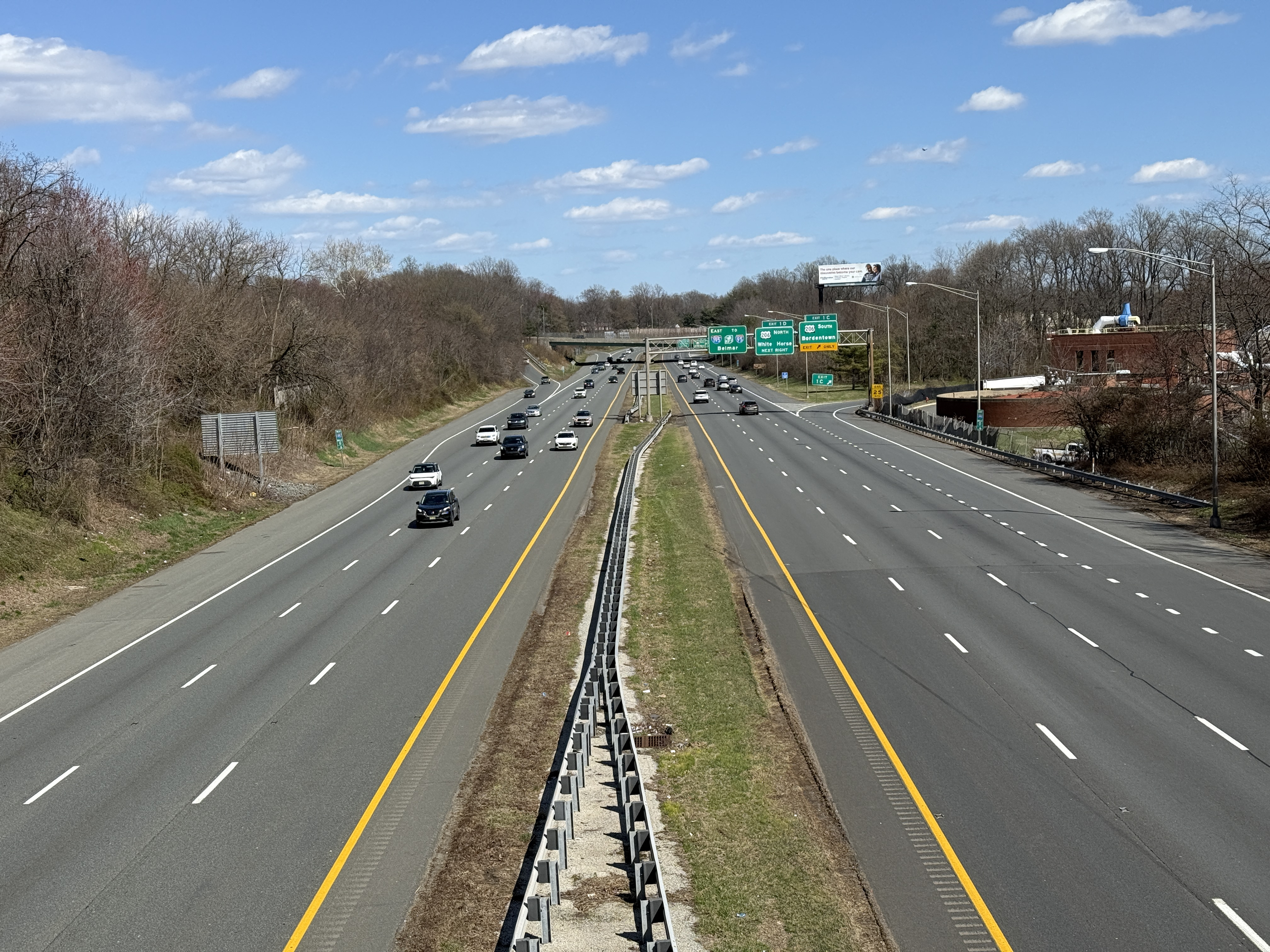
I-195 eastbound approaching US 206 in Hamilton Township

I-195's western terminus is at a modified cloverleaf interchange with I-295 in Hamilton, Mercer County, located southeast of Trenton. From this end, the freeway continues north into Trenton as Route 29. I-195 serves as the southern continuation of Route 29, continuing east from I-295 as a six-lane expressway, passing between suburban neighborhoods to the north and Crosswicks Creek to the south. After the exit for U.S. Route 206 (US 206), the highway narrows to four lanes and turns northeast as it interchanges with South Broad Street (County Route 524 [CR 524]) and Arena Drive (CR 620). Following this, I-195 passes near more neighborhoods and runs to the northwest of Gropp Lake before turning more to the east. The route has a cloverleaf interchange with Yardville-Hamilton Square Road before passing near business parks and reaching a cloverleaf interchange with US 130. After US 130, the road enters Robbinsville Township as the settings start to become more rural, with a few areas of suburban development. In Robbinsville, there is a ramp that provides access to the New Jersey Turnpike (I-95). Shortly after passing over the New Jersey Turnpike, I-195 reaches the exit for CR 526. The highway runs to the north of Allentown before briefly forming the border between Robbinsville to the north and Upper Freehold Township, Monmouth County, to the south as it reaches the interchange with CR 524/CR 539.

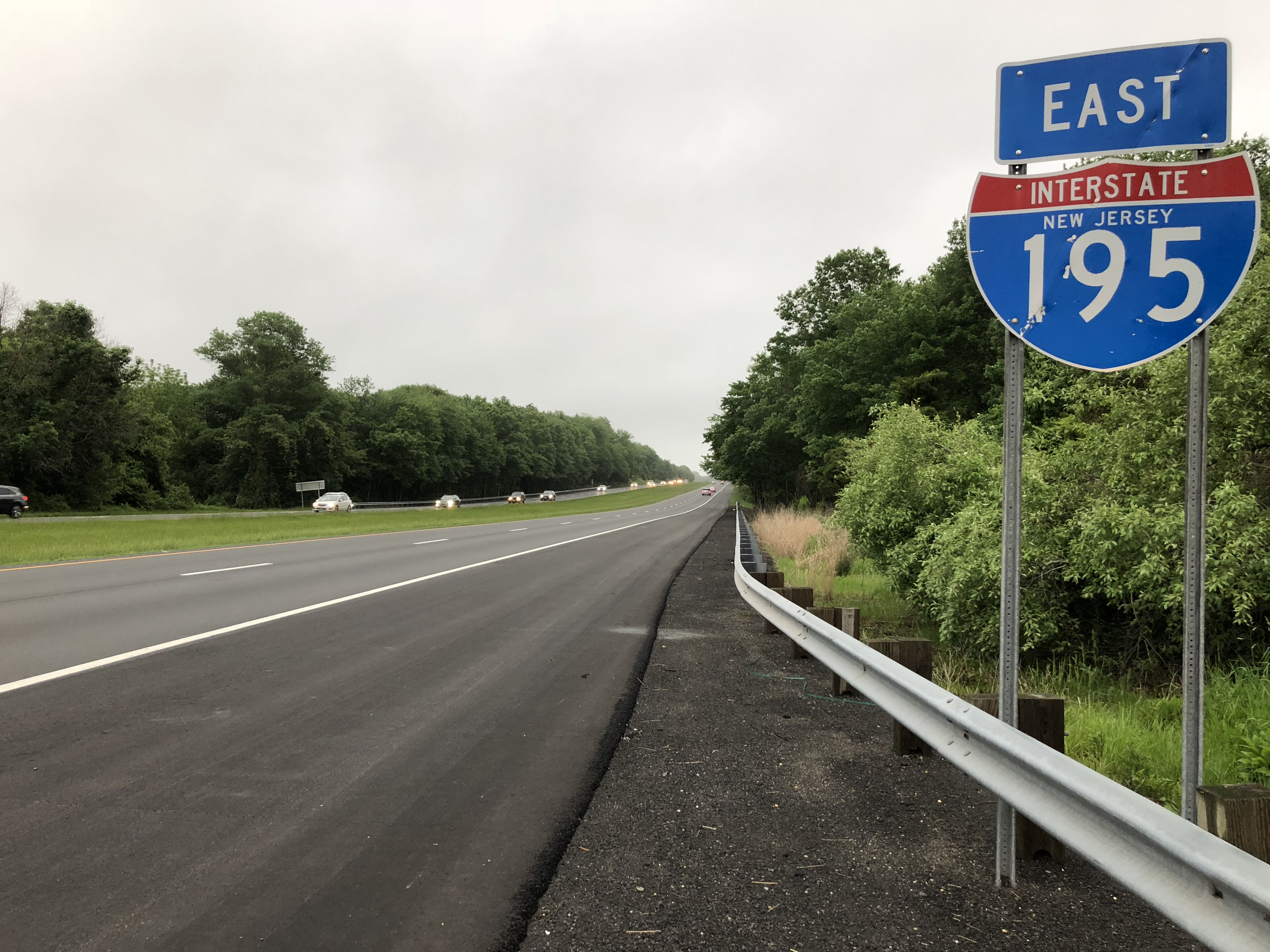
I-195 eastbound past the CR 43 interchange in Upper Freehold Township

Upon passing under CR 524/CR 539, I-195 fully enters Upper Freehold in Monmouth County and continues east through a mix of woodland and farmland. The next interchange the highway reaches is with Imlaystown-Hightstown Road (CR 43). Past this exit, the highway passes through more rural areas and crosses into Millstone Township. In this area, I-195 turns to the southeast and enters more forested areas as it comes to a cloverleaf interchange with CR 537. This exit off I-195 provides access to the Six Flags amusement park and the Jackson Premium Outlets. Due to the presence of Six Flags, this exit off I-195 can become busy during the summer months since it provides access to the park from both the New Jersey Turnpike and the Garden State Parkway, which lies just east of I-195's eastern terminus. Upon crossing CR 537, the highway enters Jackson Township, Ocean County, and continues east through heavy woods. The road comes to an exit with CR 527, where there is a park-and-ride lot for motorists. The median of I-195 widens past the interchange with CR 527 before narrowing as it comes to the interchange with CR 638. The road runs through more woodland, with nearby residential development increasing.

After crossing the North Branch of the Metedeconk River, I-195 continues into Howell Township, Monmouth County, and turns northeast, reaching a cloverleaf interchange with US 9. At this point, the road turns east again and soon heads back into dense woods, passing over the Southern Secondary railroad line operated by the Delaware and Raritan River Railroad. After crossing the Manasquan River, the expressway interchanges with CR 547, which provides access to CR 524 and CR 549. Shortly after CR 547, I-195 enters Wall Township and passes through Allaire State Park. The eastern end of I-195 is located at exit 35, its junction with Route 34 that has access to the southbound Garden State Parkway from the eastbound direction. At the exit for Route 34, I-195 ends and Route 138 begins, but the highway and exit numbering continue onto Route 138, marking the interchange with the Garden State Parkway as exit 36. Past this interchange, Route 138 continues east to Belmar on the Jersey Shore as an arterial boulevard, making connections with Route 18 and Route 35.

== History ==
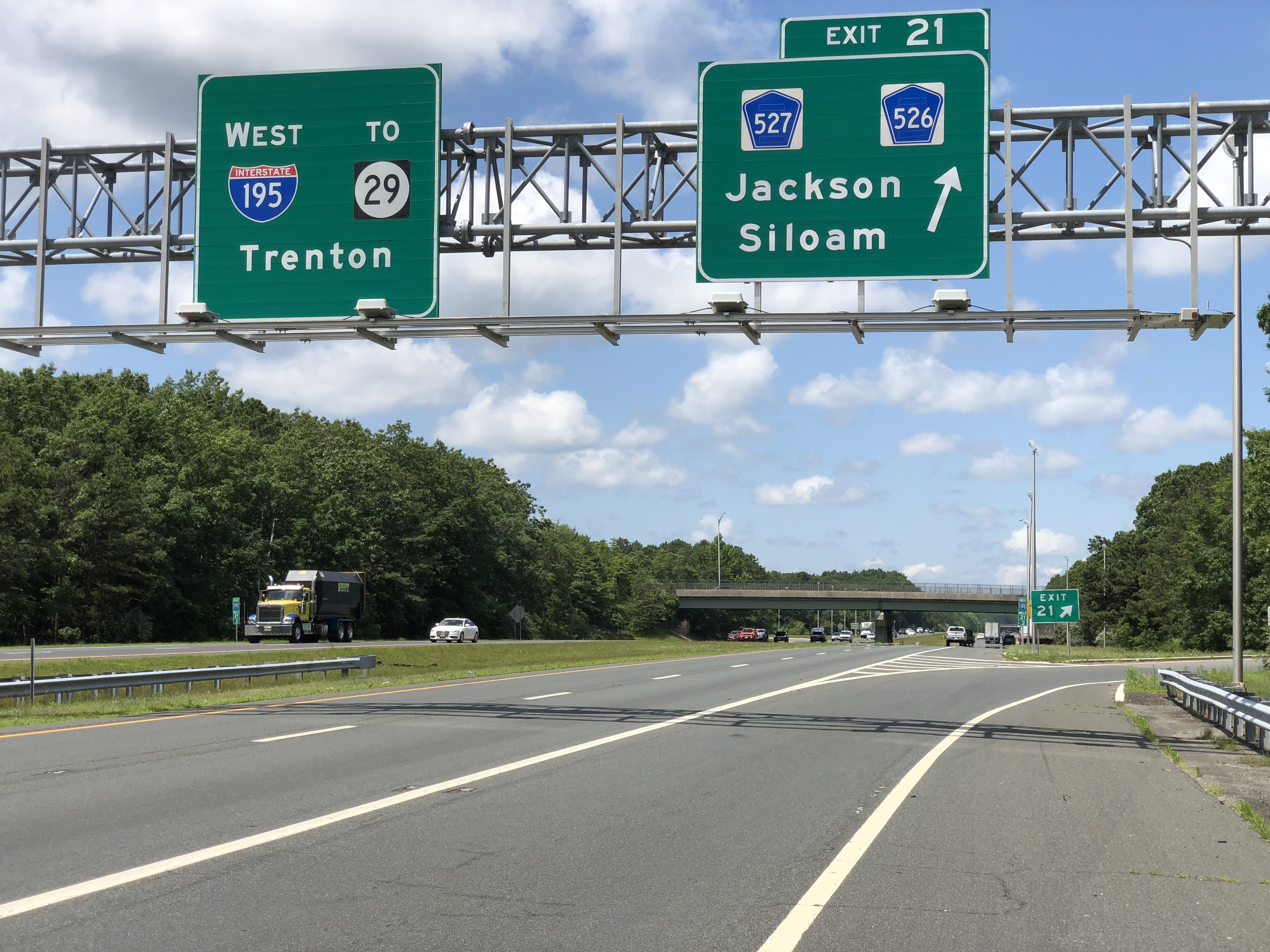
I-195 westbound at the CR 527 exit in Jackson

What would become I-195 was first proposed in the late 1950s as a toll road called the Trenton–Asbury Park Expressway that was to be operated by the New Jersey Highway Authority, the owner of the Garden State Parkway at the time. In 1965, this road would be incorporated into a planned Central Jersey Expressway System. The western portion would become a part of the Route 37 freeway that was to run from Trenton to Seaside Heights while the eastern portion would become a part of the Route 38 freeway that was to run from Camden to Belmar. The two freeways were to meet near Fort Dix. By 1967, plans for the Route 38 freeway were canceled, leaving Route 37 as the only planned east–west freeway through central New Jersey. The routing of this freeway, which was to be called the Central Jersey Expressway, was changed to run from the Trenton area east to Wall Township In addition, officials pushed for Interstate Highway funding for the freeway, with funds to be diverted from the canceled I-278 in Union County. The proposed freeway would cost $60 million (equivalent to $429 million in 2024).

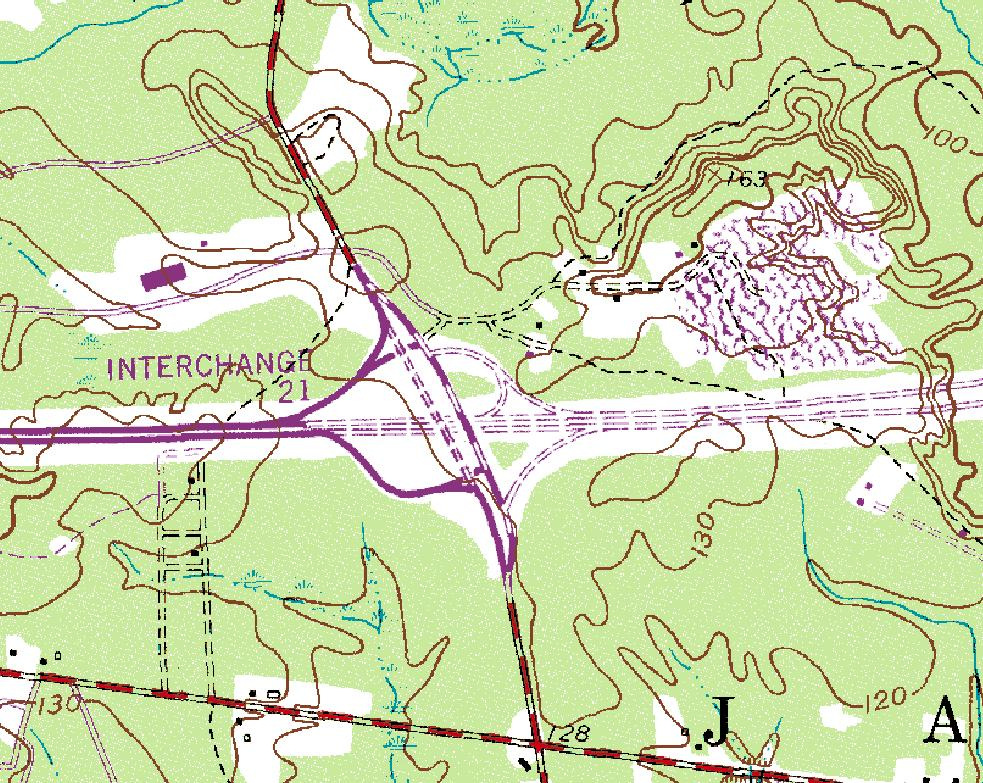
Interchange 21 was once the eastern terminus of I-195, as this US Geological Survey map illustrates

By 1970, construction took place on the route between CR 539 near Allentown and CR 527 in Jackson Township. The portion of I-195 between the New Jersey Turnpike and CR 527 was opened by 1973 and construction on the section between White Horse and the New Jersey Turnpike began. In 1979, I-195 was completed east to Howell Township. By 1983, the length of I-195 was completed.

When it was planned, I-195 did not intersect I-95 at all; it instead connected to I-295 at its west end. When I-95 was rerouted to the New Jersey Turnpike after the cancelation of the Somerset Freeway, I-195 was connected to I-95. Previously, I-95 abruptly ended at I-295 and US 1 in Lawrence Township and motorists had to take I-295 southbound to I-195 east in order to access the New Jersey Turnpike (I-95). This is no longer necessary as a result of the Pennsylvania Turnpike/Interstate 95 Interchange Project which opened to traffic on September 22, 2018, completing the full length of I-95 from Miami, Florida, to Houlton, Maine.

On April 6, 1988, President Ronald Reagan signed H.R. 4263 naming I-195 in New Jersey the James J. Howard Interstate Highway, in honor of the late James J. Howard, a US Representative from New Jersey who advocated improving the highways of the US.

In 1997, separate ramps were added from I-195 to westbound and eastbound CR 537, and the westbound ramp was expanded to two lanes for Six Flags traffic.

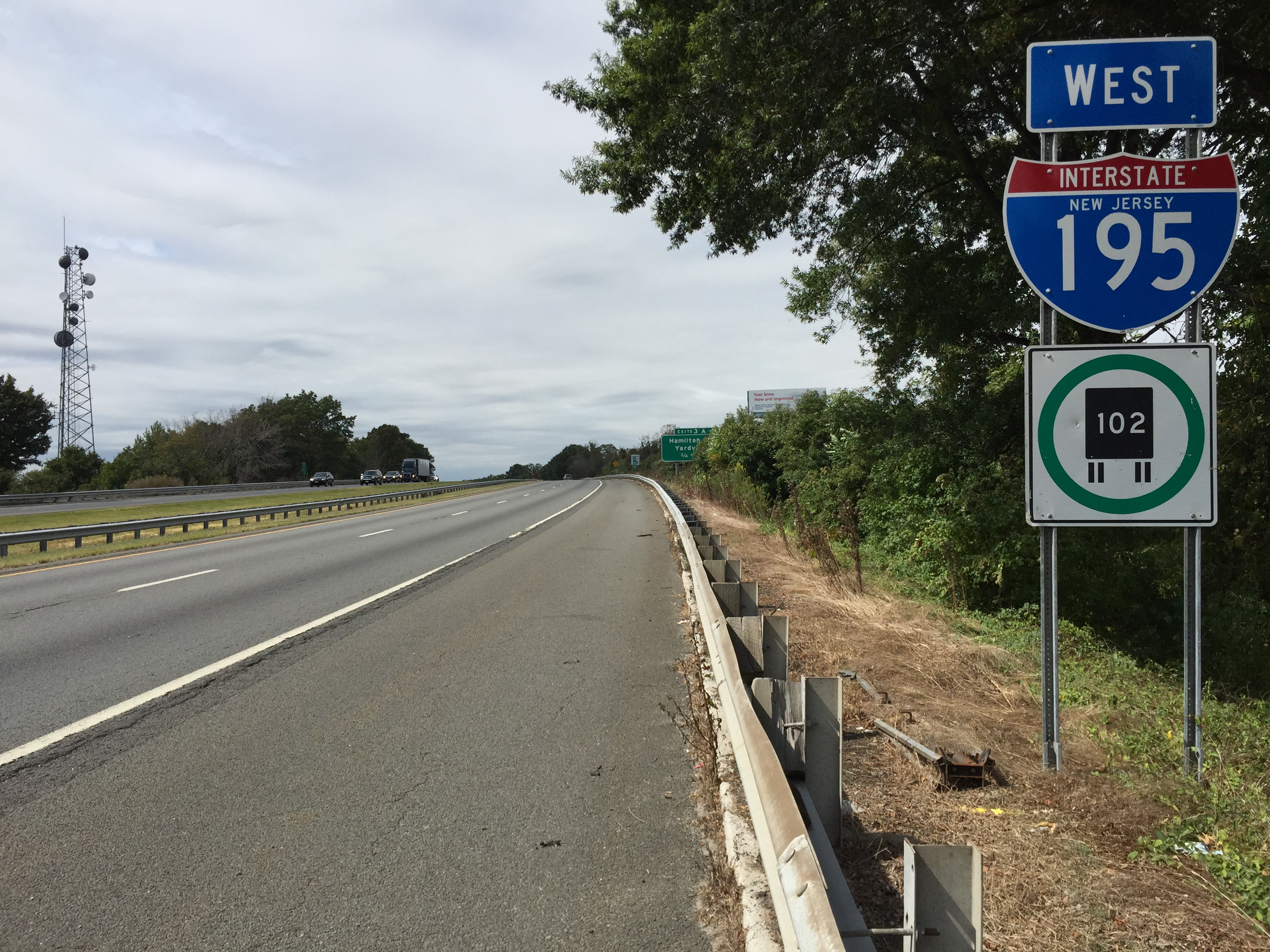
View west along I-195 in Hamilton

I-195, like many other highways in New Jersey, once had solar-powered emergency callboxes every one mile (1.6 km). With the advent of cellphones, the callboxes saw limited use. To save on maintenance costs, the New Jersey Department of Transportation (NJDOT) removed the callboxes in 2005.

On April 30, 2010, NJDOT started a project to repave the expressway both eastbound and westbound from just east of the turnpike overpasses near exit 7 in Robbinsville Township to exit 11 in Upper Freehold Township. This was completed in late 2010.

From July 2009 until November 2014, the New Jersey Turnpike (I-95) was widened with the construction of new outer roadways ("truck lanes") that extended the "dual-dual" roadways south to exit 6 in Mansfield Township from its former end at Exit 8A in Monroe Township. As part of this project, the overpasses carrying I-195 over the turnpike were reconstructed, the exit 7A toll gate was widened, and all the ramps connecting directly to the mainline of the turnpike were rebuilt which included building a new high-speed ramp over I-195 to enter the northbound lanes of the turnpike.

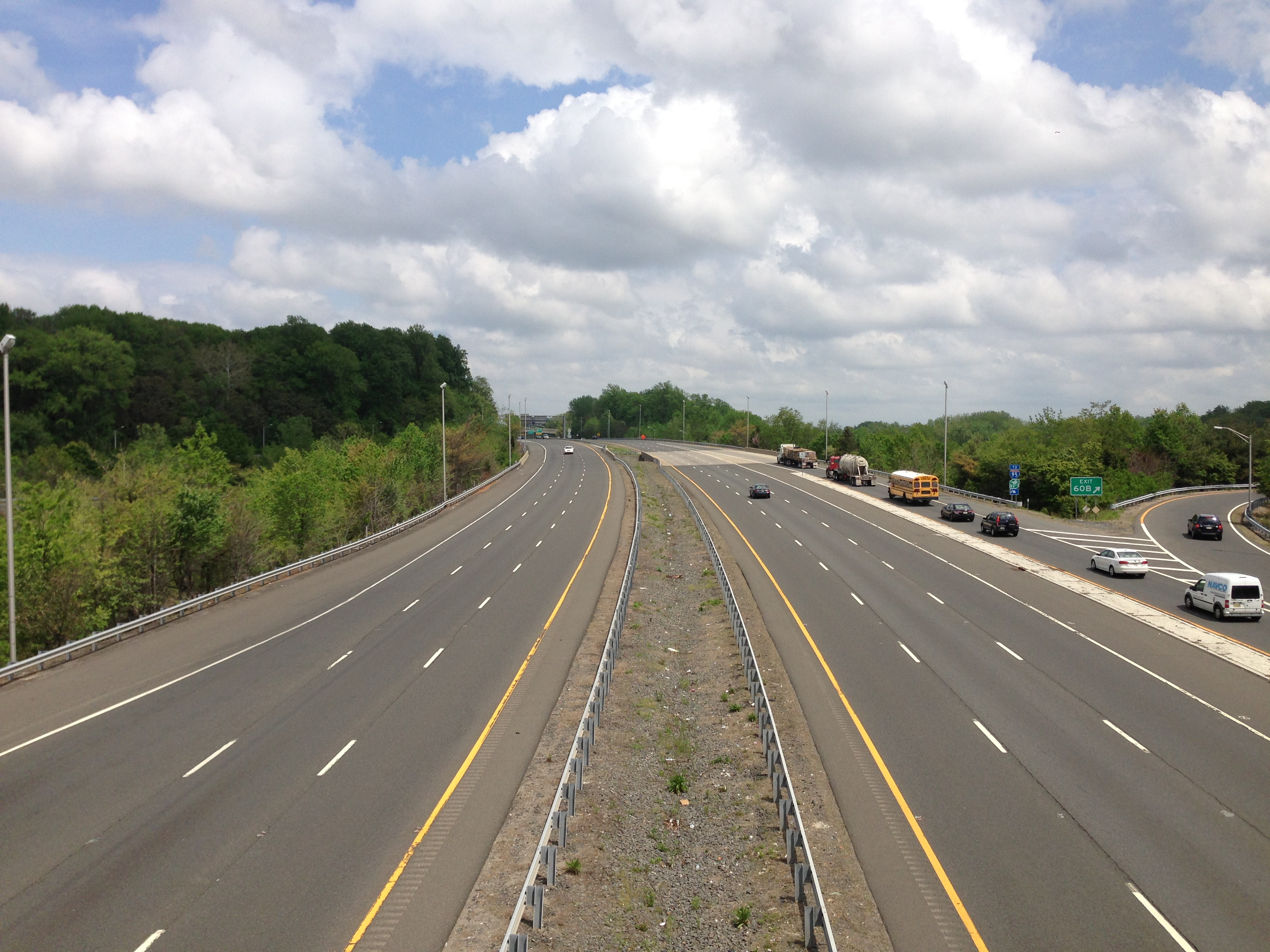
View east along I-195 from its western terminus at I-295 in Hamilton

For about a decade, there was a plan to extend the designation of I-195 to the west in tandem with the rerouting of I-95 planned as part of the Pennsylvania Turnpike/Interstate 95 Interchange Project. Beginning in 2005, plans were made to extend I-195 west from its present-day western terminus along I-295 and I-95, continuing counterclockwise to the north, west, and south around Trenton to the new interchange. I-295 would have been truncated to the current interchange with I-195. Officials from New Jersey and Pennsylvania had agreed to submit the I-195 request to American Association of State Highway and Transportation Officials (AASHTO), as no route designation is official until approved by them. Had it been approved, approximately 27.1 miles (43.6 km) would have been added to I-195. Interchange renumbering would have also taken place in concert with the future I-195 designation in Pennsylvania and both the planned and current I-195 designation in New Jersey. This proposal had received conditional approval from AASHTO. However, on May 20, 2015, the original plan of extending I-295 west and south into Pennsylvania to the new interchange was approved instead, leaving the western terminus of I-195 at its current location.

In 2018, the exit numbers at the interchanges for I-295 (exits 60A–B) and US 206 (exits 1A–B) were renumbered to exits 1A–B and exits 1C–D, respectively. This change was done as part of the I-95/I-295 redesignation project to match the milemarkers along I-195.

== Future ==
In the late 1990s, NJDOT considered the possibility of widening I-195 to six lanes between the New Jersey Turnpike and CR 537 in order to accommodate traffic going to Six Flags Great Adventure. NJDOT has revived the possibility, and has studied proposals to widen I-195 between CR 537 and the New Jersey Turnpike from four to six total lanes, eliminating the grass median in the process.

== Exit list ==
County	Location	mi	km	Old exit	New exit	Destinations	Notes
Mercer	Hamilton Township	0.00	0.00			Route 29 north to Route 129 – Trenton	Continuation north
Mercer	Hamilton Township	0.00	0.00	60	1A–B	I-295 to US 1 – Camden, Princeton	Partial cloverleaf interchange; signed as exits 1A (south) and 1B (north); exits 60A-B on I-295
Mercer	Hamilton Township	0.92	1.48	1A–B	1C–D	US 206 – Bordentown, White Horse	Eastbound exit and westbound entrance; signed as exits 1C (south) and 1D (north)
Mercer	Hamilton Township	1.55	2.49		2	South Broad Street – Yardville (EB) US 206 / South Broad Street, Arena Drive (WB)	US 206/South Broad Street/Arena Drive not signed eastbound; Yardville not signed westbound; access via CR 524 / CR 620
Mercer	Hamilton Township	3.37	5.42		3	Yardville, Hamilton Square	Signed as exits 3A (Yardville) and 3B (Hamilton Square); access via Yardville-Hamilton Square Road
Mercer	Hamilton Township	4.90	7.89		5	US 130 – New Brunswick, Bordentown	Signed as exits 5A (south) and 5B (north)
Mercer	Robbinsville Township	6.25	10.06		6	I-95 Toll / N.J. Turnpike – New York, Camden	Exit 7A on I-95 / N.J. Turnpike
Mercer	Robbinsville Township	7.31	11.76		7	CR 526 – Robbinsville, Allentown	
Mercer–Monmouth county line	Robbinsville–Upper Freehold township line	8.54	13.74		8	CR 539 – Allentown, Hightstown	
Monmouth	Upper Freehold Township	11.79	18.97		11	Coxs Corner, Imlaystown	Access via CR 43
Monmouth–Ocean county line	Millstone–Jackson township line	16.71	26.89		16	CR 537 – Freehold, Mount Holly, Six Flags	Signed as exits 16A (west) and 16B (east) eastbound
Ocean	Jackson Township	21.04	33.86		21	CR 527 to CR 526 – Siloam, Jackson	
Ocean	Jackson Township	22.99	37.00		22	Georgia, Jackson Mills	Access via CR 638
Monmouth	Howell Township	27.17	43.73		28	US 9 – Lakewood, Freehold	Signed as exits 28A (south) and 28B (north)
Monmouth	Howell Township	31.57	50.81		31	CR 547 to CR 524 / CR 549 – Lakewood, Farmingdale, Allaire State Park	Signed as exits 31A (south) and (north)
Monmouth	Wall Township	34.17	54.99		35	Route 34 to G.S. Parkway south – Matawan, Brielle, Point Pleasant	Signed as exits 35A (south) and 35B (north)
Monmouth	Wall Township	34.17	54.99			G.S. Parkway north Route 138 east – Belmar	Continuation east
1.000 mi = 1.609 km; 1.000 km = 0.621 mi: Incomplete access; Tolled
