= Coxs Corner, New Jersey =

Coxs Corner, New Jersey may refer to:

- Coxs Corner, Burlington County, New Jersey
- Coxs Corner, Mercer County, New Jersey
- Coxs Corner, Monmouth County, New Jersey
