= Jackson Mills, New Jersey =

Populated place in Ocean County, New Jersey, US

- Unincorporated community
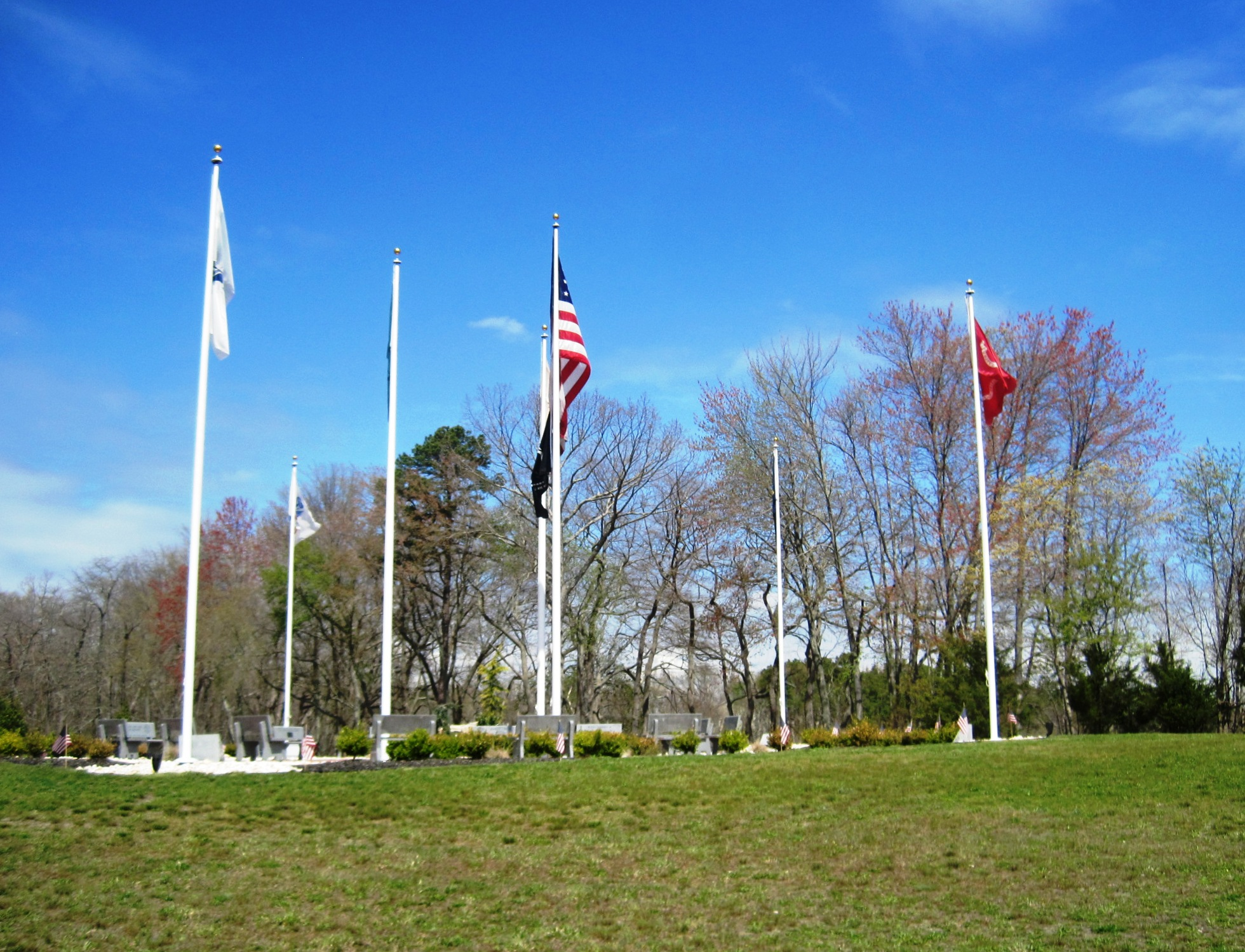
- Jackson Township Veterans Memorial Garden in Jackson Mills

- Jacksons Mills's location in Ocean County (Inset: Ocean County in New Jersey) Jackson Mills (New Jersey) Jackson Mills (the United States)
- Coordinates: 40°08′52″N 74°19′27″W
- Country: United States
- State: New Jersey
- County: Ocean
- Township: Jackson
- Elevation: 98 ft (30 m)
- ZIP Code: 08527
- GNIS feature ID: 0877394

Jackson Mills is an unincorporated community located within Jackson Township, in Ocean County, in the U.S. state of New Jersey. Jackson Mills is located near exit 22 on Interstate 195. It is also located nearby County Route 526 (County Line Road and Commodore Boulevard) and Jackson Mills Lake. The site was originally home to a sawmill owned by William Jackson (after whom the township may have been named). Today surrounding the lake are some houses and townhomes, small businesses, and the Jackson Township Veterans Memorial Garden, though this area of the township is more rural than other more suburbanized portions of it due to the higher density of forest.
