= William Henry Green =

American academic (1824–1900)

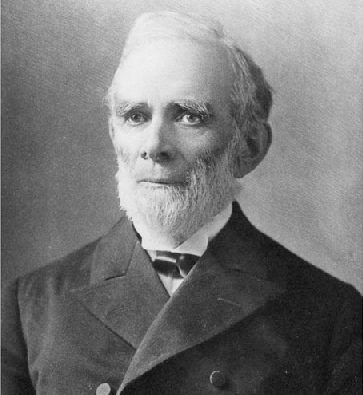
- Born: January 27, 1824; Groveville, New Jersey
- Died: February 10, 1900 (aged 76); Princeton, New Jersey
- Occupation: Scholar

William Henry Green (January 27, 1824 – February 10, 1900), was an American scholar of the Hebrew language. He was born in Groveville, near Bordentown, New Jersey.

Green was descended in the sixth generation from Jonathan Dickinson, first president of the College of New Jersey (now Princeton University). His ancestors had been closely connected with the Presbyterian church. He graduated in 1840 from Lafayette College, where he was tutor in mathematics (1840–1842) and adjunct professor (1843–1844). In 1846 he graduated from Princeton Theological Seminary, and was instructor in Hebrew there from 1846 to 1849.

He was ordained in 1848 and was pastor of the Central Presbyterian church of Philadelphia from 1849 to 1851. From August 1851 until his death, in Princeton, New Jersey, aged 75, he was professor of Biblical and Oriental Literature in Princeton Theological Seminary. From 1859 the title of his chair was Oriental and Old Testament Literature.

Green was elected as a member to the American Philosophical Society in 1863.

In 1868 Green refused the presidency of Princeton College; as senior professor he was long acting head of the Theological Seminary. His Grammar of the Hebrew Language (1861, revised 1888) was a distinct improvement in method on Gesenius, Rödiger, Ewald and Nordheimer. All his knowledge of Semitic languages he used in a conservative Higher Criticism, which is maintained in the following works:

- The Pentateuch Vindicated from the Aspersions of Bishop Colenso (1863)
- Moses and the Prophets (1883)
- The Hebrew Feasts in their Relation to Recent Critical Hypotheses Concerning the Pentateuch (1885)
- The Unity of the Book of Genesis (1895)
- The Higher Criticism of the Pentateuch (1895)
- A General Introduction to the Old Testament, vol. i. Canon (1898), vol. ii. Text (1899)

Additionally, in 1890 he published a highly influential article in Bibliotheca Sacra entitled "Primeval Chronology" in which he strongly criticized Irish Archbishop James Ussher's popular chronology of the world back to Creation and its association with the King James Bible:

We conclude that the Scriptures furnish no data for a chronological computation prior to the life of Abraham; and that the Mosaic records do not fix and were not intended to fix the precise date either of the Flood or of the creation of the world.

He was the scholarly leader of the orthodox wing of American Presbyterianism, and was the moderator of the General Assembly of 1891. Green was chairman of the Old Testament committee of the Anglo-American Bible revision committee.
