= Georgia, New Jersey =

Populated place in Monmouth County, New Jersey, US

- Unincorporated community
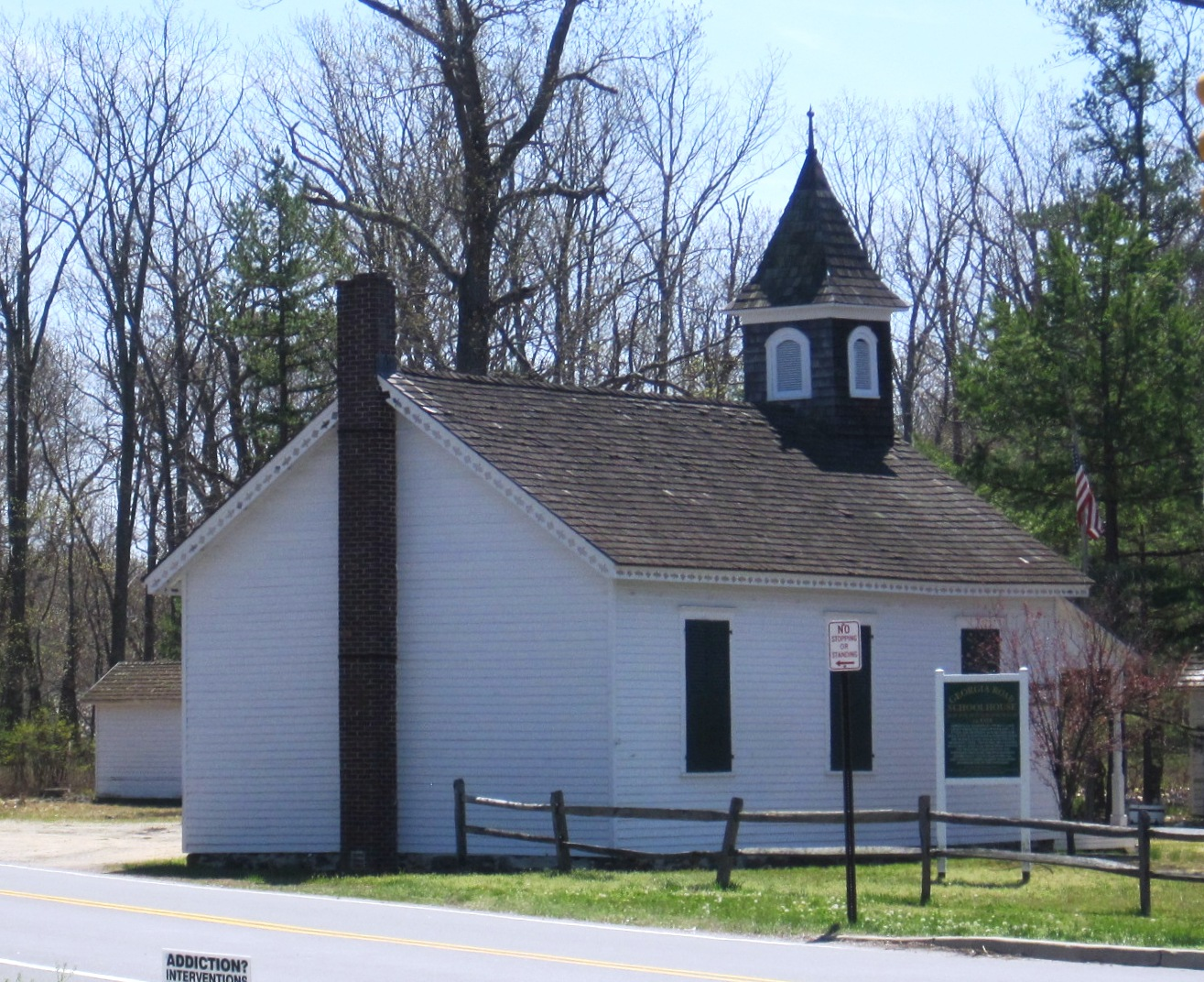
- Georgia Road Schoolhouse

- Location in Monmouth County. Inset: Location of county within the state of New Jersey Georgia (New Jersey) Georgia (the United States)
- Coordinates: 40°11′14″N 74°17′05″W
- Country: United States
- State: New Jersey
- County: Monmouth
- Township: Freehold
- Elevation: 125 ft (38 m)
- Time zone: UTC−05:00 (Eastern (EST))
  - Summer (DST): UTC−04:00 (EDT)
- Area codes: 732/848
- GNIS feature ID: 876589

Georgia is an unincorporated community located within Freehold Township in Monmouth County, in the U.S. state of New Jersey. Exit 22 on Interstate 195 provides access to Georgia via Jackson Mills Road (County Route 23). There is also a road in the area called Georgia Road (CR 53), leading to Turkey Swamp Park. Georgia sits at the northern reaches of the Pine Barrens and numerous housing developments are located north and east of the settlement.
