= Josiah T. Allinson =

New Jersey Assembly member (1858–1937)

Member of the New Jersey General Assembly
- In office 1916–1918

Personal details
- Born: April 19, 1858 Yardville, New Jersey
- Died: June 15, 1937 (aged 79) Trenton, New Jersey
- Party: Republican

Josiah T. Allinson (April 19, 1858 – June 15, 1937) was an American farmer, banker, and Republican Party politician from Hamilton Township, Mercer County, New Jersey who served in the New Jersey General Assembly from 1916 to 1918. He was a longtime advocate for agricultural interests in the state and member of the League to Enforce Peace.

== Early life and education ==
Josiah T. Allinson was born in the Yardville section of Hamilton Township, Mercer County, New Jersey, on April 19, 1858, to Samuel and Ann (née Tatum) Allinson. He was educated in private schools in Westtown, Pennsylvania and the Crosswicks section of Chesterfield Township, New Jersey. He attended the New Jersey Model School in Trenton and Bryant & Stratton Business College in Philadelphia. Later, he took a course in sanitary engineering and mechanical training at the Franklin Institute.

From an early age, he was interested in politics and became a member of the Young Republicans.

== Career ==
=== Farming and agricultural interests ===
Allinson was a lifelong farmer and advocate for agricultural interests. He was active in the National Grange movement as early as 1905, serving as the secretary of the local Hamilton Township and Mercer County associations for six years, as well as the master of the Hamilton association for one year. At the state level, he served for six years as a member of the New Jersey association finance committee.

In 1912, he was elected president of the Mercer County Board of Agriculture, serving through 1919. He was the founding president of the Mercer County Farm Bureau and a member of the board of the New Jersey Agricultural Experiment Station in New Brunswick, serving as its vice president from 1917 to 1918.

In April 1913, he was a delegate to the first national convention of Marketing and Farm Credit in Chicago. He was also a delegate to the Merchants-Bankers-Laborers-Agricultural Reconstruction convention held at the Robert Treat Hotel in Newark.

=== Politics and public service ===
In 1907, Allinson served as commissioner of appeals before his election as tax assessor for Hamilton Township.

In 1909, Governor Franklin W. Fort appointed him to a commission reporting on fish and game laws in the state.

In 1915, Allinson was elected to a one-year term in the New Jersey General Assembly. He was re-elected in 1916 and 1917. In 1917 and 1918, he served as chair of the Assembly Committee on Towns and Townships. On February 27, 1918, Allinson was elected as county committeeman for the League to Enforce Peace, an organization dedicated to the proposition of an international body for world peace.

On September 12, 1918, Allinson was appointed by U.S. Secretary of Agriculture David F. Houston as agricultural advisor to the local draft board.

=== Banking ===
Allinson was president of Yardville National Bank until resigning in 1933 due to ill health. At the time of his death, Allinson owned a 200-acre (81 ha) farm in Yardville.

== Personal life and death ==
He was a member of the Elks, the Freemasons, and the Fall Cedars.

Allinson died on June 15, 1937 at Mercer Hospital in Trenton.
