= White Horse, New Jersey =

Populated place in Mercer County, New Jersey, US

- Census-designated place
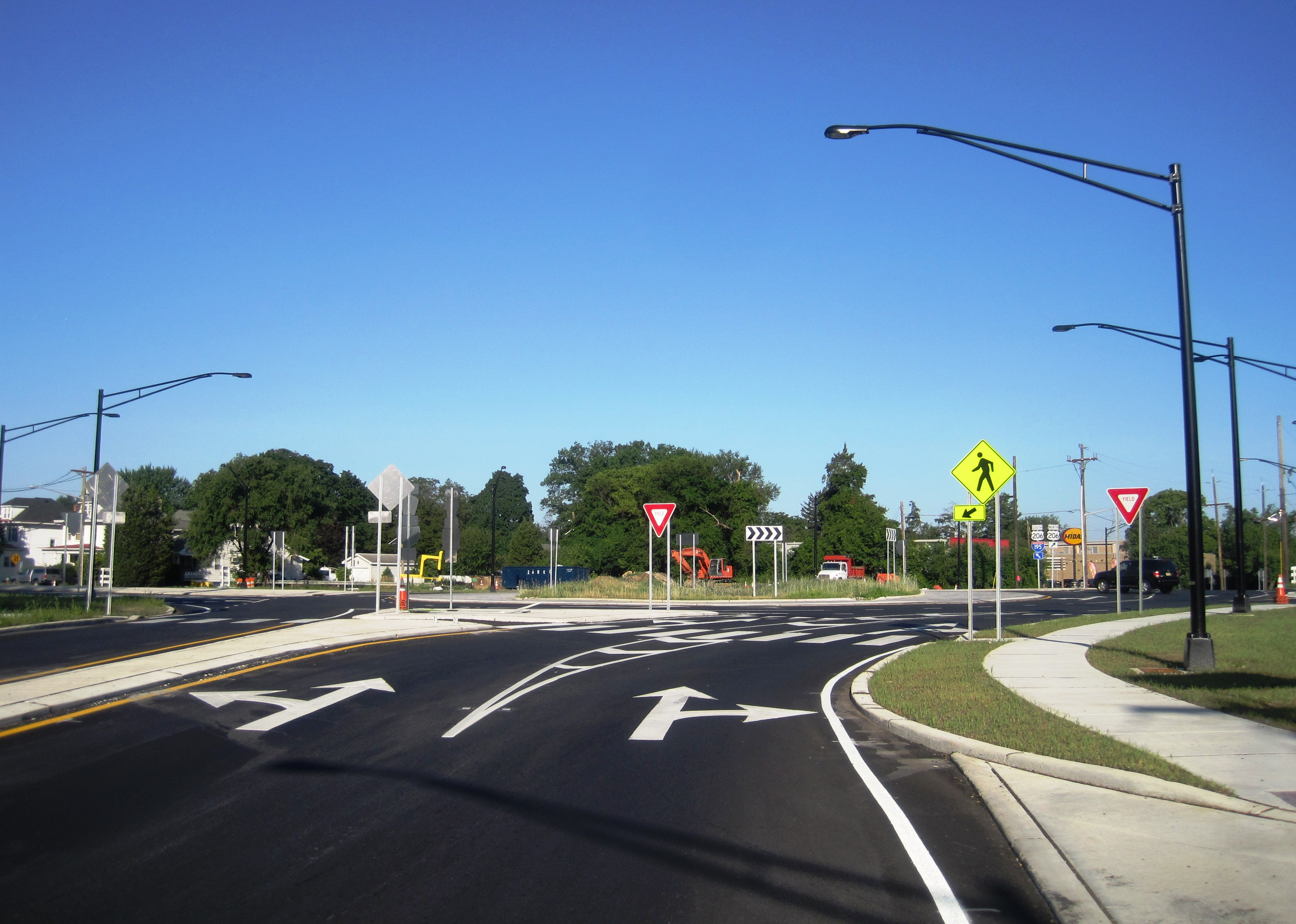
- White Horse Circle

- Location in Mercer County and the state of New Jersey

- Location within Mercer County, New Jersey Location within New Jersey Location within the United States
- Coordinates: 40.191823°N 74.701372°W
- Country: United States
- State: New Jersey
- County: Mercer
- Township: Hamilton

Area
  - Total: 3.17 sq mi (8.22 km^{2})
  - Land: 3.12 sq mi (8.07 km^{2})
  - Water: 0.058 sq mi (0.15 km^{2}) 2.05%
- Elevation: 92 ft (28 m)

Population (2020)
  - Total: 9,791
  - Density: 3,140.6/sq mi (1,212.59/km^{2})
- Time zone: UTC−05:00 (Eastern (EST))
  - Summer (DST): UTC−04:00 (Eastern (EDT))
- ZIP Code: 08610 (Trenton)
- FIPS code: 34-80630
- GNIS feature ID: 02390504

White Horse is an unincorporated community and census-designated place (CDP) in Hamilton Township, Mercer County, New Jersey, in the United States. As of the 2020 United States census, the CDP's population was 9,791.

== History ==
The community's name derives from a local tradition that holds that George Washington rode through the area on a white horse in 1789 on his journey from Virginia to New York City for his first presidential inauguration.

== Geography ==
White Horse is in southern Mercer County, with part of its southern border following Crosswicks Creek, the border with Burlington County to the south. Interstate 195 forms the remainder of the southern border of the community. Interstate 295 passes through the western part of the community. White Horse is bordered to the southeast by Yardville, and downtown Trenton is 4 miles (6 km) to the northwest. U.S. Route 206 passes through the center of White Horse, following Broad Street to the northwest toward Trenton. In the other direct, US 206 leads south 3 miles (5 km) to Bordentown.

According to the United States Census Bureau, the White Horse CDP has a total area of 3.18 square miles (8.24 km^{2}), including 3.12 square miles (8.08 km^{2}) of land and 0.06 square miles (0.16 km^{2}) of water (1.80%).

=== White Horse Circle ===
White Horse Circle is a traffic circle locally known by name, in the southwest part of White Horse. Up until 2018 it was not a true traffic circle, because it was bisected by northbound U.S. Route 206, which made a left turn in the circle. This intersection connects South Broad Street (US 206 north and Route 524 east), White Horse-Mercerville Road (Route 533 north) and Bordentown Road (US 206 south). Only Route 533 had a stop sign at the circle, while Route 524 and the southern part of Route 206 have traffic signals some distance from the circle. To allow cars to move in a safe fashion, there were six yield-signed road segments allowing cars to get to Route 206 and from the highway to Route 533. Route 206, when the light allowed, had no yield sign restrictions. Since the completion of Interstate 195 and Interstate 295, which intersect southwest of the circle, much of the traffic that would have passed through the circle is able to use the wider, faster freeways, reducing the traffic load at the circle. Hamilton Township approved a construction project under which the modifications at the circle were completed by 2018, at a site that the township's engineer described as having an average of one accident a week. The new circle operates as a roundabout with two concentric lanes and many arrows to help drivers navigate the circle. The biggest change was the new requirement to yield to traffic in the circle, rather than yielding to traffic on the major roads. Accidents have decreased since this new roundabout was finished.

In the 1927 New Jersey state highway renumbering, Route 37 was legislated to run from Route 27 and Route 30 (now U.S. Route 1 Business, U.S. Route 206, and Route 31) in Trenton continuing through the White Horse Circle and on to Seaside Heights. The western end of Route 37 was once planned to be at White Horse Circle, though that section of the planned route was eventually built as Interstate 195, with other portions returned to the counties as part of Route 524.

A 10-foot (3.0 m) tall statue of a white horse was constructed on the circle in 2010, commemorating the local tradition that George Washington rode through the area on a white horse while traveling to New York City in 1789.

== Demographics ==
Historical population
Census	Pop.	Note	%±
1970	18,680		—
1980	10,098		−45.9%
1990	9,397		−6.9%
2000	9,373		−0.3%
2010	9,494		1.3%
2020	9,791		3.1%
Population sources: 1970-1980; 1950 1960 1970; 1980 1990 2000; 2010 2020

White Horse first appeared as a census designated place in the 1980 U.S. census formed along with the Yardville-Groveville CDP out of the unincorporated community of White Horse-Yardville (pop. 18,680 in 1970).

=== 2020 census ===
As of the 2020 census, White Horse had a population of 9,791. The median age was 44.6 years. 18.2% of residents were under the age of 18 and 21.4% of residents were 65 years of age or older. For every 100 females, there were 95.0 males, and for every 100 females age 18 and over, there were 92.5 males.

100.0% of residents lived in urban areas, while 0.0% lived in rural areas.

There were 3,903 households in White Horse, of which 25.8% had children under the age of 18 living in them. Of all households, 50.6% were married-couple households, 15.8% were households with a male householder and no spouse or partner present, and 28.0% were households with a female householder and no spouse or partner present. About 27.0% of all households were made up of individuals and 14.2% had someone living alone who was 65 years of age or older.

There were 4,048 housing units, of which 3.6% were vacant. The homeowner vacancy rate was 1.3% and the rental vacancy rate was 4.9%.

Racial composition as of the 2020 census
Race	Number	Percent
White	7,034	71.8%
Black or African American	697	7.1%
American Indian and Alaska Native	30	0.3%
Asian	304	3.1%
Native Hawaiian and Other Pacific Islander	1	0.0%
Some other race	794	8.1%
Two or more races	931	9.5%
Hispanic or Latino (of any race)	1,812	18.5%

=== 2010 census ===
The 2010 United States census counted 9,494 people, 3,875 households, and 2,682 families in the CDP. The population density was 3,088.0 people per square mile (1,192.3 people/km^{2}). There were 4,018 housing units at an average density of 1,306.9 units per square mile (504.6 units/km^{2}). The racial makeup was 87.91% (8,346) White, 5.59% (531) Black or African American, 0.07% (7) Native American, 2.19% (208) Asian, 0.09% (9) Pacific Islander, 2.62% (249) from other races, and 1.52% (144) from two or more races. Hispanic or Latino of any race were 8.55% (812) of the population.

Of the 3,875 households, 25.0% had children under the age of 18; 53.9% were married couples living together; 11.2% had a female householder with no husband present and 30.8% were non-families. Of all households, 26.6% were made up of individuals and 13.5% had someone living alone who was 65 years of age or older. The average household size was 2.45 and the average family size was 2.96.

19.3% of the population were under the age of 18, 6.6% from 18 to 24, 24.6% from 25 to 44, 29.5% from 45 to 64, and 20.0% who were 65 years of age or older. The median age was 44.6 years. For every 100 females, the population had 91.8 males. For every 100 females ages 18 and older there were 90.0 males.

=== 2000 census ===
As of the 2000 United States census there were 9,373 people, 3,722 households, and 2,687 families living in the CDP. The population density was 1,134.5 people/km^{2} (2,938 people/mi^{2}). There were 3,818 housing units at an average density of 462.1 units/km^{2} (1,197 units/mi^{2}). The racial makeup of the CDP was 91.80% White, 3.82% African American, 0.06% Native American, 1.66% Asian, 1.48% from other races, and 1.17% from two or more races. Hispanic or Latino of any race were 3.97% of the population.

There were 3,722 households, out of which 27.2% had children under the age of 18 living with them, 58.5% were married couples living together, 10.5% had a female householder with no husband present, and 27.8% were non-families. 24.0% of all households were made up of individuals, and 12.2% had someone living alone who was 65 years of age or older. The average household size was 2.52 and the average family size was 3.00.

In the CDP the population was spread out, with 20.6% under the age of 18, 6.0% from 18 to 24, 28.8% from 25 to 44, 24.8% from 45 to 64, and 19.8% who were 65 years of age or older. The median age was 42 years. For every 100 females, there were 90.3 males. For every 100 females age 18 and over, there were 87.3 males.

The median income for a household in the CDP was $60,061, and the median income for a family was $67,050. Males had a median income of $47,176 versus $34,710 for females. The per capita income for the CDP was $25,480. About 1.6% of families and 3.9% of the population were below the poverty line, including 4.9% of those under age 18 and 7.8% of those age 65 or over.

== Education ==
All of Hamilton Township, including White Horse, is served by the Hamilton Township School District.
