= Groveville, New Jersey =

Populated place in Mercer County, New Jersey, US

- Census-designated place
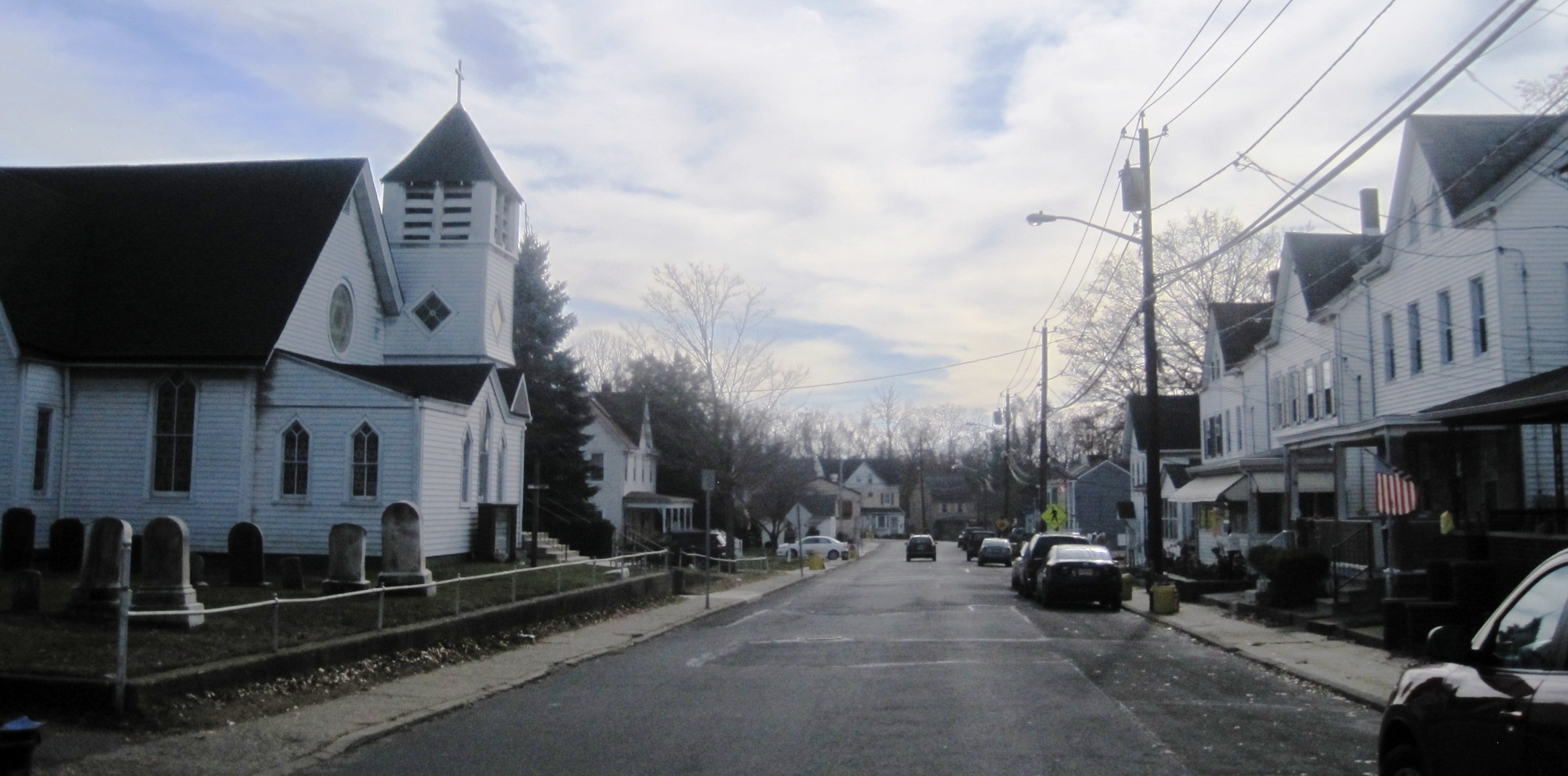
- Along Church Street (CR 609)

- Location in Mercer County and the state of New Jersey

- Location in Mercer County Location in New Jersey Location in the United States
- Coordinates: 40.170048°N 74.651278°W
- Country: United States
- State: New Jersey
- County: Mercer
- Township: Hamilton

Area
  - Total: 2.25 sq mi (5.83 km^{2})
  - Land: 2.21 sq mi (5.73 km^{2})
  - Water: 0.039 sq mi (0.10 km^{2}) 1.71%
- Elevation: 49 ft (15 m)

Population (2020)
  - Total: 3,106
  - Density: 1,404.4/sq mi (542.24/km^{2})
- Time zone: UTC−05:00 (Eastern (EST))
  - Summer (DST): UTC−04:00 (Eastern (EDT))
- ZIP Code: 08620 - Trenton
- FIPS code: 34-28620
- GNIS feature ID: 02583996

Groveville is an unincorporated community and census-designated place (CDP) located within Hamilton Township, in Mercer County, in the U.S. state of New Jersey. As of the 2020 census, the CDP's population was 3,106. Before the 2010 Census, the area was part of the Yardville-Groveville CDP.

== Geography ==
Groveville is in southern Mercer County, bordered to the south by Crosswicks Creek, which forms the Burlington County line. The hamlet of Groveville is in the western part of the CDP, centered on the junction of Main Street and Church Street, while North Crosswicks is in the southeastern part of the CDP, at the intersection of South Broad Street and a separate Church Street. Groveville is bordered to the north by the community of Yardville. The New Jersey Turnpike (Interstate 95) crosses the eastern part of the CDP between Exits 7 and 7A, with no direct access.

According to the United States Census Bureau, the CDP had a total area of 2.160 square miles (5.593 km^{2}), including 2.123 square miles (5.498 km^{2}) of land and 0.037 square miles (0.096 km^{2}) of water (1.71%). The southern part of the CDP is drained by Crosswicks Creek, while Doctors Creek, a tributary of Crosswicks, flows through the northern part. The CDP is part of the Delaware River watershed.

== Demographics ==
Historical population
Census	Pop.	Note	%±
2010	2,945		—
2020	3,106		5.5%
U.S. Decennial Census; 2010 2020

Groveville first appeared as a census designated place in the 2010 U.S. census formed from part of deleted Yardville-Groveville CDP and additional area.

=== Racial and ethnic composition ===
Groveville CDP, New Jersey – Racial and ethnic composition Note: the US Census treats Hispanic/Latino as an ethnic category. This table excludes Latinos from the racial categories and assigns them to a separate category. Hispanics/Latinos may be of any race.
Race / Ethnicity (NH = Non-Hispanic)	Pop 2010	Pop 2020	% 2010	% 2020
White alone (NH)	2,350	2,320	79.80%	74.69%
Black or African American alone (NH)	247	288	8.39%	9.27%
Native American or Alaska Native alone (NH)	2	2	0.07%	0.06%
Asian alone (NH)	95	120	3.23%	3.86%
Native Hawaiian or Pacific Islander alone (NH)	0	0	0.00%	0.00%
Other race alone (NH)	3	8	0.10%	0.26%
Mixed race or Multiracial (NH)	38	87	1.29%	2.80%
Hispanic or Latino (any race)	210	281	7.13%	9.05%
Total	2,945	3,106	100.00%	100.00%

=== 2020 census ===
As of the 2020 census, Groveville had a population of 3,106. The median age was 41.2 years. 21.0% of residents were under the age of 18 and 14.1% were 65 years of age or older. For every 100 females there were 98.6 males, and for every 100 females age 18 and over there were 97.3 males age 18 and over.

94.1% of residents lived in urban areas, while 5.9% lived in rural areas.

There were 1,124 households in Groveville, of which 34.3% had children under the age of 18 living in them. Of all households, 59.3% were married-couple households, 13.9% were households with a male householder and no spouse or partner present, and 21.2% were households with a female householder and no spouse or partner present. About 17.5% of all households were made up of individuals and 7.2% had someone living alone who was 65 years of age or older.

There were 1,180 housing units, of which 4.7% were vacant. The homeowner vacancy rate was 1.7% and the rental vacancy rate was 6.2%.

=== 2010 census ===
The 2010 United States census counted 2,945 people, 1,046 households, and 810 families in the CDP. The population density was 1,387.4 per square mile (535.7/km^{2}). There were 1,093 housing units at an average density of 514.9 per square mile (198.8/km^{2}). The racial makeup was 84.58% (2,491) White, 8.59% (253) Black or African American, 0.10% (3) Native American, 3.29% (97) Asian, 0.00% (0) Pacific Islander, 1.73% (51) from other races, and 1.70% (50) from two or more races. Hispanic or Latino of any race were 7.13% (210) of the population.

Of the 1,046 households, 38.6% had children under the age of 18; 59.3% were married couples living together; 12.9% had a female householder with no husband present and 22.6% were non-families. Of all households, 18.2% were made up of individuals and 6.1% had someone living alone who was 65 years of age or older. The average household size was 2.81 and the average family size was 3.21.

25.1% of the population were under the age of 18, 9.7% from 18 to 24, 24.1% from 25 to 44, 30.7% from 45 to 64, and 10.4% who were 65 years of age or older. The median age was 39.6 years. For every 100 females, the population had 94.6 males. For every 100 females ages 18 and older there were 92.7 males.

== Education ==
All of Hamilton Township, including Groveville, is served by the Hamilton Township School District.
