= Yardville, New Jersey =

Populated place in Camden County, New Jersey, US

- Census-designated place
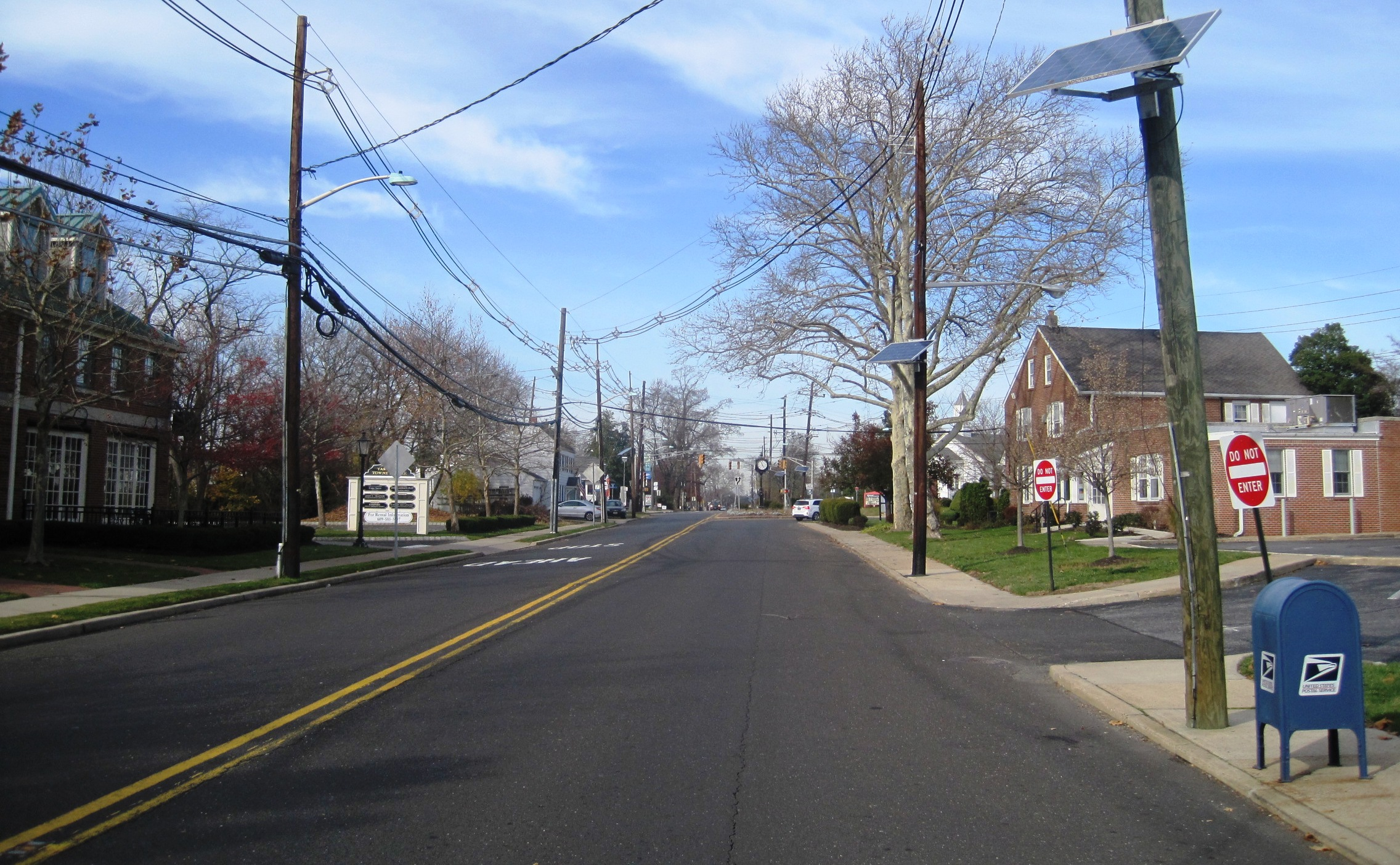
- Along South Broad Street (CR 672)

- Location in Mercer County and the state of New Jersey
- Interactive map of Yardville, New Jersey
- Location within Mercer County, New Jersey Location within New Jersey Location within the United States
- Coordinates: 40.186645°N 74.66308°W
- Country: United States
- State: New Jersey
- County: Mercer
- Township: Hamilton

Area
  - Total: 4.10 sq mi (10.63 km^{2})
  - Land: 4.07 sq mi (10.55 km^{2})
  - Water: 0.031 sq mi (0.08 km^{2}) 0.56%
- Elevation: 59 ft (18 m)

Population (2020)
  - Total: 6,965
  - Density: 1,710.2/sq mi (660.31/km^{2})
- Time zone: UTC−05:00 (Eastern (EST))
  - Summer (DST): UTC−04:00 (Eastern (EDT))
- ZIP Codes: 08620 (Hamilton)
- FIPS code: 34-83170
- GNIS feature ID: 02633183

Yardville is an unincorporated community and census-designated place (CDP) in Hamilton Township, Mercer County, New Jersey, United States. As of the 2020 United States census, the CDP's population was 6,965. Before the 2010 census, the area was part of the Yardville-Groveville CDP.

== Geography ==
Yardville is in southern Mercer County, bordered to the northwest by White Horse and to the southeast by Groveville. It is bordered to the southwest by Crosswicks Creek, a tributary of the Delaware River, and by Burlington County across the creek. Interstate 195 forms part of the northern border of the CDP, while U.S. Route 130 runs through the center of the community, leading southwest 3 miles (5 km) to Bordentown and northeast 9 miles (14 km) to Hightstown. Trenton, the state capital, is 6 miles (10 km) northwest of Yardville.

According to the United States Census Bureau, the CDP has a total area of 4.10 square miles (10.62 km^{2}), including 4.07 square miles (10.54 km^{2}) of land and 0.03 square miles (0.08 km^{2}) of water (0.76%).

== Name origin ==
Formerly called Sand Hills, it was renamed prior to 1879 in honor of the first postmaster of the town, John Yard.

== Demographics ==
Historical population
Census	Pop.	Note	%±
2010	7,186		—
2020	6,965		−3.1%
U.S. Decennial Census

Yardville first appeared as a census designated place in the 2010 U.S. census formed from part of deleted Yardville-Groveville CDP and additional area.

=== Racial and ethnic composition ===
Yardville CDP, New Jersey – Racial and ethnic composition Note: the US Census treats Hispanic/Latino as an ethnic category. This table excludes Latinos from the racial categories and assigns them to a separate category. Hispanics/Latinos may be of any race.
Race / Ethnicity (NH = Non-Hispanic)	Pop 2010	Pop 2020	% 2010	% 2020
White alone (NH)	6,459	5,678	89.88%	81.52%
Black or African American alone (NH)	190	276	2.64%	3.96%
Native American or Alaska Native alone (NH)	5	6	0.07%	0.09%
Asian alone (NH)	168	201	2.34%	2.89%
Native Hawaiian or Pacific Islander alone (NH)	0	2	0.00%	0.03%
Other race alone (NH)	0	18	0.00%	0.26%
Mixed race or Multiracial (NH)	54	172	0.75%	2.47%
Hispanic or Latino (any race)	310	612	4.31%	8.79%
Total	7,186	6,965	100.00%	100.00%

=== 2020 census ===
As of the 2020 census, Yardville had a population of 6,965. The median age was 45.8 years. 17.0% of residents were under the age of 18 and 20.5% were 65 years of age or older. For every 100 females there were 94.2 males, and for every 100 females age 18 and over there were 92.4 males.

94.5% of residents lived in urban areas, while 5.5% lived in rural areas.

There were 2,776 households, of which 25.3% had children under the age of 18 living in them. Of all households, 56.8% were married-couple households, 13.9% were households with a male householder and no spouse or partner present, and 23.3% were households with a female householder and no spouse or partner present. About 23.6% of all households were made up of individuals, and 11.4% had someone living alone who was 65 years of age or older.

There were 2,876 housing units, of which 3.5% were vacant. The homeowner vacancy rate was 1.0% and the rental vacancy rate was 6.4%.

=== 2010 census ===
The 2010 United States census counted 7,186 people, 2,757 households, and 2,048 families in the CDP. The population density was 1,773.9 per square mile (684.9/km^{2}). There were 2,841 housing units at an average density of 701.3 per square mile (270.8/km^{2}). The racial makeup was 92.93% (6,678) White, 2.80% (201) Black or African American, 0.07% (5) Native American, 2.34% (168) Asian, 0.00% (0) Pacific Islander, 1.00% (72) from other races, and 0.86% (62) from two or more races. Hispanic or Latino of any race were 4.31% (310) of the population.

Of the 2,757 households, 28.4% had children under the age of 18; 61.2% were married couples living together; 9.0% had a female householder with no husband present and 25.7% were non-families. Of all households, 21.5% were made up of individuals and 9.3% had someone living alone who was 65 years of age or older. The average household size was 2.60 and the average family size was 3.03.

20.0% of the population were under the age of 18, 7.8% from 18 to 24, 23.5% from 25 to 44, 32.5% from 45 to 64, and 16.2% who were 65 years of age or older. The median age was 44.3 years. For every 100 females, the population had 96.5 males. For every 100 females ages 18 and older there were 91.6 males.

== Education ==
All of Hamilton Township, including Yardville, is served by the Hamilton Township School District.

== Notable people ==
People who were born in, residents of, or otherwise closely associated with Yardville include:

- Josiah T. Allinson (1858–1937), farmer, banker and politician who served in the New Jersey General Assembly from 1916 to 1918
