= Yardville-Groveville, New Jersey =

Populated place in Mercer County, New Jersey, US

- Former CDP
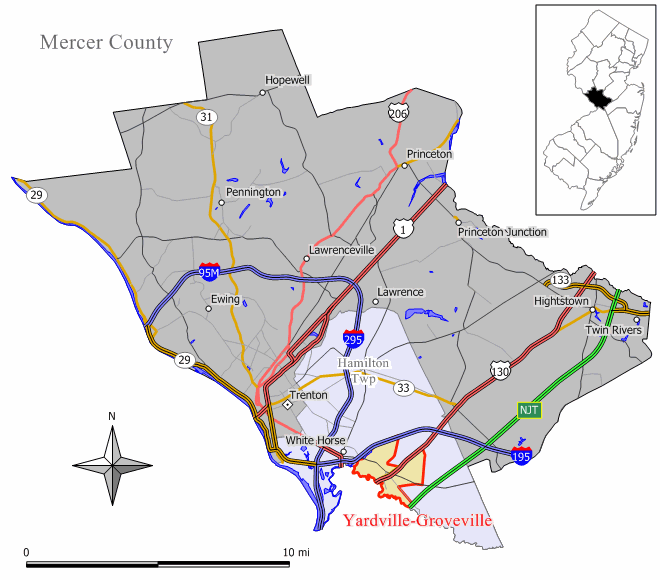
- Map of Yardville-Groveville CDP in Mercer County. Inset: Location of Mercer County in New Jersey.
- Coordinates: 40°10′50″N 74°40′16″W
- Country: United States
- State: New Jersey
- County: Mercer
- Township: Hamilton

Area
  - Total: 3.5 sq mi (9.0 km^{2})
  - Land: 3.4 sq mi (8.9 km^{2})
  - Water: 0 sq mi (0.0 km^{2})

Population (2000)
  - Total: 9,208
  - Density: 2,674/sq mi (1,032.3/km^{2})
- Time zone: UTC−05:00 (Eastern (EST))
  - Summer (DST): UTC−04:00 (EDT)
- FIPS code: 34-83185

Yardville-Groveville was an unincorporated community and former census-designated place (CDP) located within Hamilton Township, in Mercer County, in the U.S. state of New Jersey. As of the 2000 United States census, the CDP's population was 9,208.

Since the 2010 census, the area has been split into two, Yardville and Groveville.

== Geography ==
According to the United States Census Bureau, the CDP had a total area of 9.0 km^{2} (3.5 sq mi). 8.9 km^{2} (3.4 sq mi) of land and 0.1 km^{2} (0.039 sq mi) of water (0.58%).

== Demographics ==
Historical population
Census	Pop.	Note	%±
1970	18,680		—
1980	9,414		−49.6%
1990	9,248		−1.8%
2000	9,208		−0.4%
source: 1950 1960 1970; 1980 1990 2000; 2010

Yardville-Groveville first appeared as a census designated place in the 1980 U.S. census formed along with the White Horse CDP out of the unincorporated community of White Horse-Yardville (pop. 18,680 in 1970).

As of the 2000 United States census there were 9,208 people, 3,438 households, and 2,619 families residing in the CDP. The population density was 1,033.5 people/km^{2} (2,677 people/mi^{2}). There were 3,528 housing units at an average density of 396.0 units/km^{2} (1,026 units/mi^{2}). The racial makeup of the CDP was 93.09% White, 3.02% African American, 0.08% Native American, 2.00% Asian, 0.08% Pacific Islander, 0.80% from other races, and 0.93% from two or more races. Hispanic or Latino of any race were 3.01% of the population.

There were 3,438 households, out of which 33.4% had children under the age of 18 living with them, 63.6% were married couples living together, 9.1% had a female householder with no husband present, and 23.8% were non-families. 19.2% of all households were made up of individuals, and 8.8% had someone living alone who was 65 years of age or older. The average household size was 2.68 and the average family size was 3.09.

In the CDP the population was spread out, with 23.7% under the age of 18, 6.5% from 18 to 24, 31.2% from 25 to 44, 24.4% from 45 to 64, and 14.2% who were 65 years of age or older. The median age was 39 years. For every 100 females, there were 94.8 males. For every 100 females age 18 and over, there were 91.8 males.

The median income for a household in the CDP was $60,893, and the median income for a family was $68,171. Males had a median income of $46,897 versus $34,236 for females. The per capita income for the CDP was $25,391. About 0.2% of families and 1.4% of the population were below the poverty line, including 0.4% of those under age 18 and 2.0% of those age 65 or over.

== Cost of Living ==
Overall cost of living and other consumer spending categories is above the national average according to the Bureau of Labor Statistics.
