= Coxs Corner, Monmouth County, New Jersey =

Populated place in Monmouth County, New Jersey, US

Coxs Corner, New Jersey
- Unincorporated community
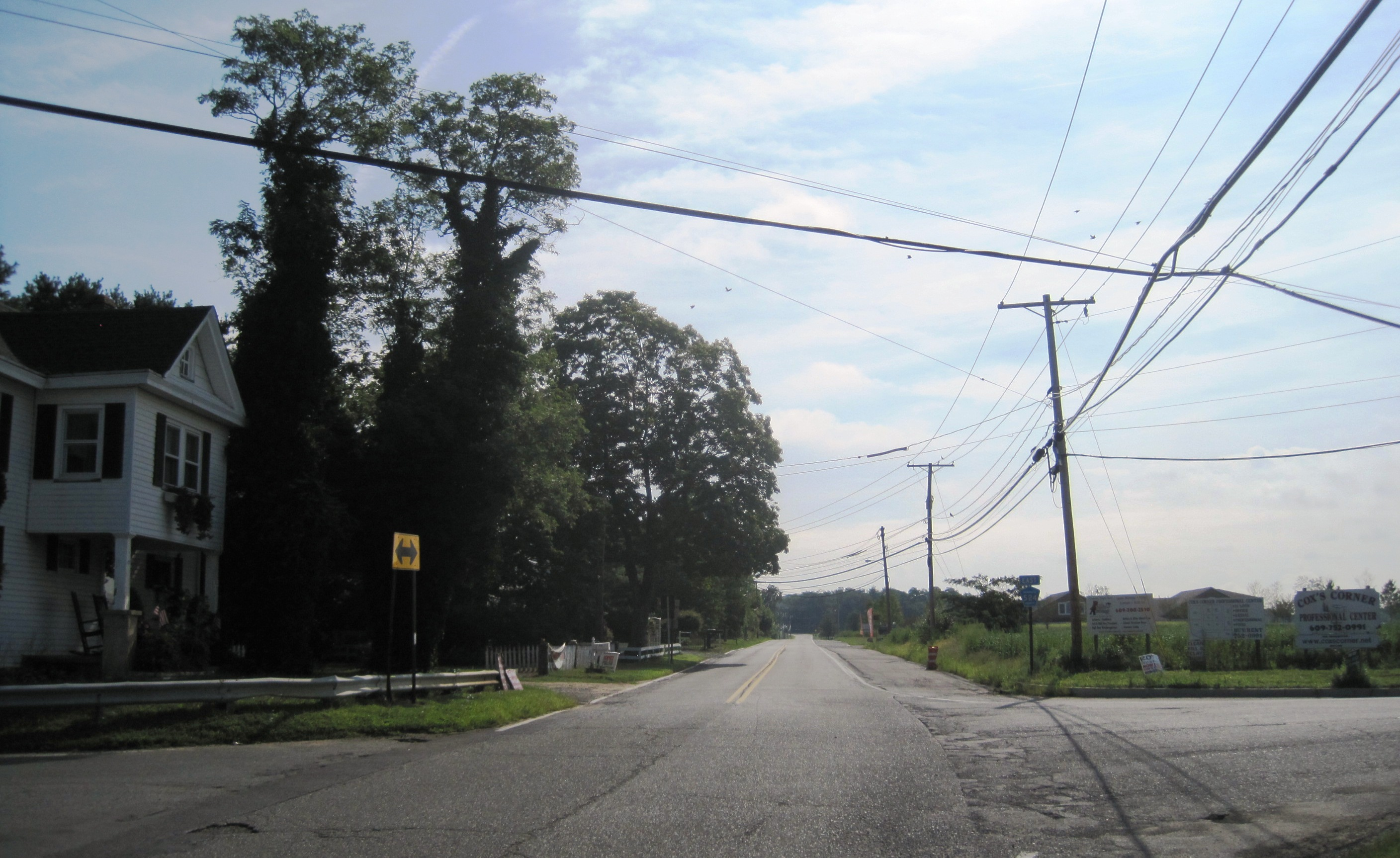
- View of the intersection facing east

- Location in Monmouth County (Inset: Monmouth County in New Jersey) Coxs Corner (New Jersey) Coxs Corner (the United States)
- Coordinates: 40°10′54″N 74°30′41″W
- Country: United States
- State: New Jersey
- County: Monmouth
- Township: Upper Freehold
- Named after: James Cox
- Elevation: 154 ft (47 m)
- Time zone: UTC−05:00 (Eastern (EST))
  - Summer (DST): UTC−04:00 (EDT)
- GNIS feature ID: 881965

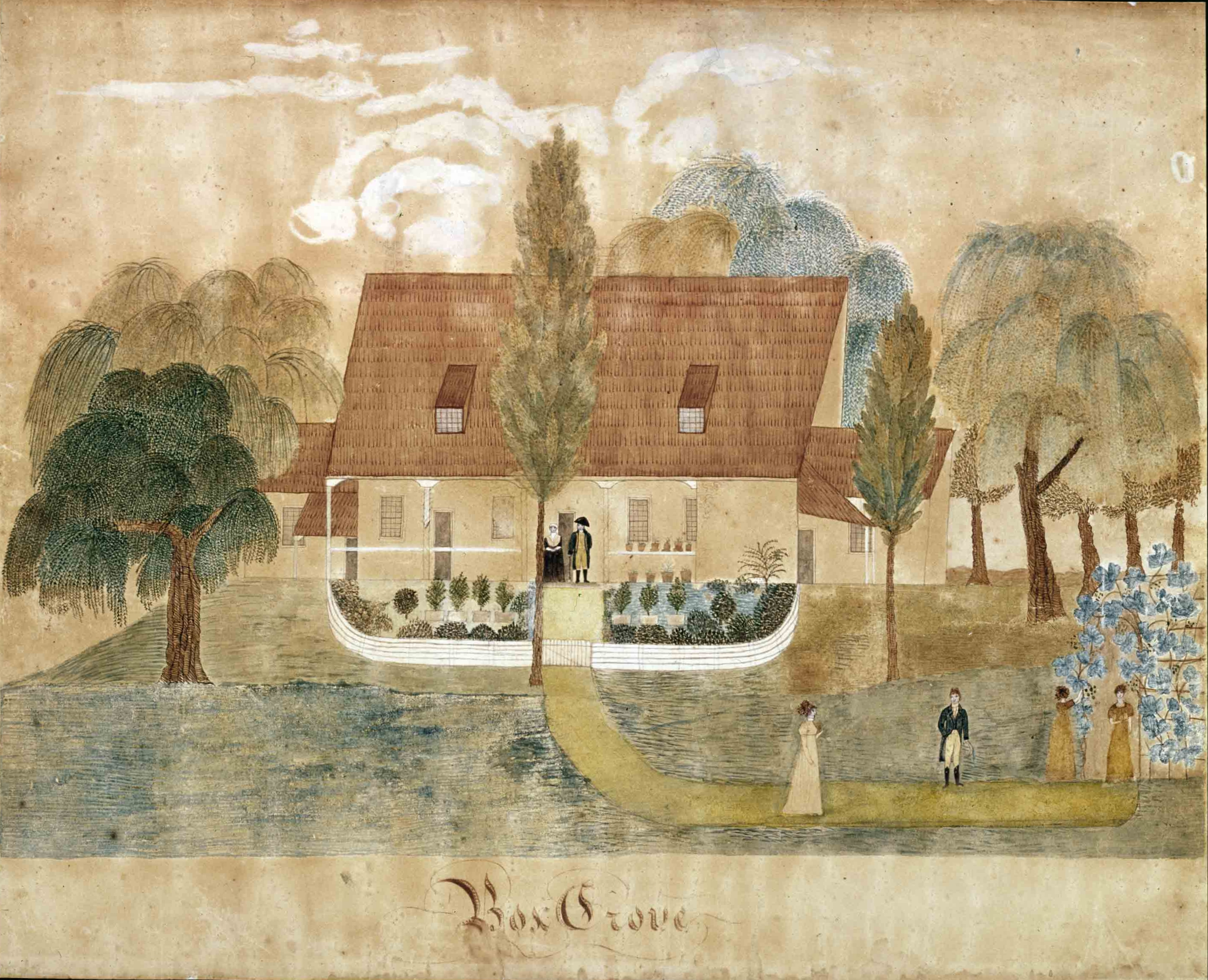
Box Grove, home of General Cox – watercolor by his daughter Amy

Coxs Corner, also known as Cox's Corner or Wrightsville, is an unincorporated community located within Upper Freehold Township, in Monmouth County, in the U.S. state of New Jersey. Named for congressman and brigadier general James Cox (1753–1810), who had lived here at the family home of "Box Grove", it is at the juncture of County Route 524 and County Route 43. The Upper Freehold Historic Farmland Byway passes through the area.

== History ==
The Cox family had lived in Upper Freehold, New Jersey since the 1600s. In the Upper Freehold area, farmsteads had been created by 1731 at key crossroads, one of these later being named Wrightsville just east of Cox's Corner.

Cox's Corner road junction existed in colonial times and one house, Merino Hill, was built for Samuel G. Wright (1781 – 1845) who was born in Wrightsville. Like Cox, he also was elected to Congress but he died before taking office. Merino Hill is on the National Register of Historic Places. The Department of Environmental Protection and the Monmouth County Historical Association have declared that this house together with six neighboring houses at Cox's Corner are suitable for historic village status. A monument was erected in 1920 to commemorate the Cox family over five generations by recording that "Thomas and Elizabeth Blashford Cox were among the first settlers of the Province of East Jersey."

The first appearance of Cox's Corner on a New Jersey map was in 1917. In 1987, the then-owner of Merino Hill wrote that Wrightsville had been the name of the settlement a short distance east. However, that name fell into disuse – and that entity no longer exists – but the name was then resurrected on modern maps to erroneously name the corner itself.
