= List of county routes in Middlesex County, New Jersey =

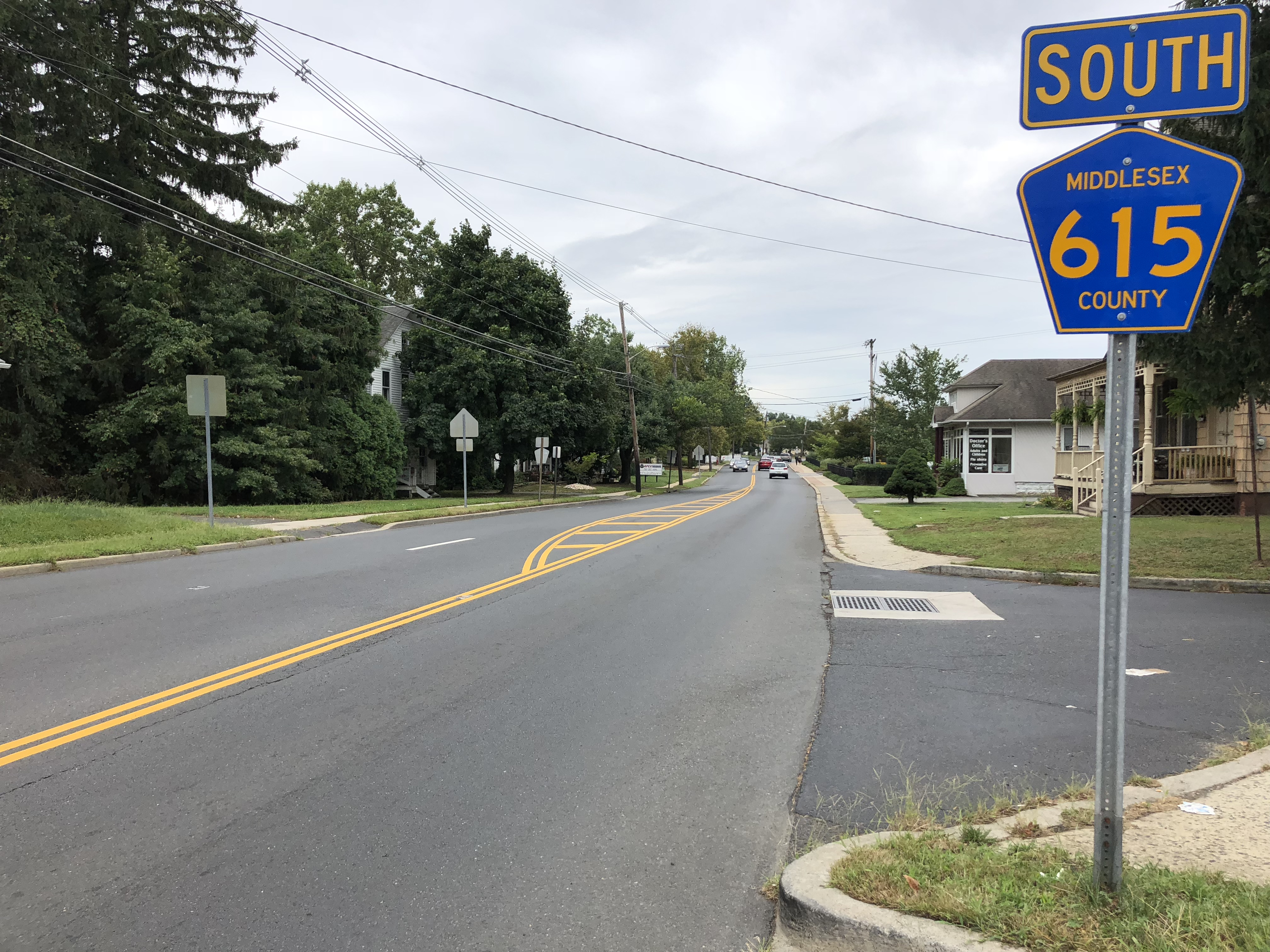
View south along CR 615 at CR 613 in Spotswood

The following is a list of county routes in Middlesex County in the U.S. state of New Jersey. For more information on the county route system in New Jersey as a whole, including its history, see County routes in New Jersey.

== 500-series county routes ==
In addition to those listed below, the following 500-series county routes serve Middlesex County:

- CR 501, CR 514, CR 516, CR 520, CR 522, CR 527, CR 529, CR 531, CR 535, CR 539

== Other county routes ==
Route	Length (mi)	Length (km)	From	Via	To	Notes
CR 601	1.70	2.74	New Market Road (CR 665) in Piscataway	Vail Avenue, West 7th Street	West 7th Street (CR 601) at the Union County line on the Piscataway/South Plainfield border	
CR 602 (I)	6.21	9.99	Lakeview Avenue (CR 603) and Plainfield Avenue (CR 603) in South Plainfield	Maple Avenue, Old Raritan Road, Inman Avenue	West Inman Avenue (CR 602) at the Union County line in Woodbridge	
CR 602 (II)	3.54	5.70	Hart Street (CR 621) at the Union County line in Woodbridge	Randolph Avenue, Roosevelt Avenue	Roosevelt Avenue (CR 604) and Washington Avenue (CR 604) in Carteret	
CR 603	4.09	6.58	Stelton Road (CR 529) on the Piscataway/South Plainfield border	Hamilton Boulevard, Lakeview Avenue, Plainfield Avenue	Plainfield Avenue (CR 603) at the Union County line in South Plainfield	
CR 603 Spur	0.07	0.11	Hamilton Boulevard (CR 603) in South Plainfield	Hamilton Boulevard	Dead end in South Plainfield	
CR 604	10.88	17.51	Park Avenue (CR 531) in South Plainfield	Oak Tree Road, Green Street, Rahway Avenue, Port Reading Avenue, Roosevelt Avenue, Washington Avenue	Roosevelt Avenue (CR 602) in Carteret	
CR 605	1.15	1.85	West 7th Street (CR 601) on the South Plainfield/Piscataway border	Clinton Avenue, Sampton Avenue	Plainfield Avenue (CR 603) in South Plainfield	
CR 606	4.78	7.69	Main Street (CR 535) and Hillside Avenue in South River	Hillside Avenue, Milltown Road	Georges Road (Route 171) in North Brunswick	
CR 606 Spur	0.12	0.19	Milltown Road (CR 606) in East Brunswick	Milltown Road	Route 18 in East Brunswick	
CR 607	2.69	4.33	East Main Street (CR 533) at the Somerset County line in Middlesex	Lincoln Boulevard, South Lincoln Avenue	Bound Brook Road (Route 28) in Middlesex	
CR 608	2.36	3.80	Route 27 in North Brunswick	Cozzens Lane, Adams Lane	Old Georges Road (CR 695) in North Brunswick	
CR 609	4.08	6.57	Landing Lane (CR 617) at the Somerset County line in New Brunswick	Landing Lane, Metlars Lane	Stelton Road (CR 529) in Piscataway	
CR 609 Spur	0.07	0.11	Easton Avenue (CR 527) in New Brunswick	Landing Lane	Landing Lane (CR 609) in New Brunswick	
CR 610	6.55	10.54	Route 27 in South Brunswick	Henderson Road, Deans Lane, Deans Rhode Hall Road	Cranbury–South River Road (CR 535) in South Brunswick	
CR 611	4.23	6.81	New Brunswick Avenue (CR 616), Smith Street (CR 656), and State Street in Perth Amboy	State Street, West Avenue	Port Reading Avenue (CR 604) in Woodbridge	
CR 612	5.01	8.06	Route 32 at the bridge over the New Jersey Turnpike (I-95) in Monroe Township	Forsgate Drive, Buckelew Avenue, Pergola Avenue, Matchaponix Avenue	Spotswood–Englishtown Road (CR 613) in Monroe Township	
CR 613	9.30	14.97	Buckelew Avenue (CR 522) and Tracy Station Road in Monroe Township	Spotswood–Englishtown Road, Spotswood Road, Devoe Avenue, Main Street, Summerhill Road	Cranbury Road (CR 535) in East Brunswick	
CR 613 Spur	0.09	0.14	Cranbury Road (CR 535) and Summerhill Road (CR 613) in East Brunswick	Hope Street	Route 18 in East Brunswick	
CR 614	12.77	20.55	US 1 in Plainsboro	Scudders Mill Road, Dey Road, Cranbury–South River Road, Prospect Plains Road, Hoffman Station Road	Buckelew Avenue (CR 522) and Mounts Mill Road in Monroe Township	
CR 614 (I)	0.31	0.50	Scudders Mill Road (CR 614) and Dey Road in Plainsboro	Scudders Mill Road	Plainsboro Road in Plainsboro	
CR 614 (II)	0.87	1.40	North Main Street (CR 535) and Plainsboro Road (CR 535) in Cranbury	North Main Street	US 130 in Cranbury	
CR 614 Connector	0.16	0.26	Scudders Mill Road (CR 614) in Plainsboro		Plainsboro Road in Plainsboro	Jughandle
CR 615	23.44	37.72	Cranbury Road (CR 615) at the Mercer County line in Plainsboro	Cranbury Neck Road, South Main Street, Station Road, Union Valley Road, Union Valley Half Acre Road, Prospect Plains Road, Half Acre Road, Lincoln Avenue, Helmetta Road, Main Street, Bordentown Avenue	South Pine Avenue in South Amboy	
CR 615 Spur	0.16	0.26	Hooker Street on the Jamesburg/Monroe Township border	Hooker Street	Helmetta Road (CR 615) and Lincoln Avenue (CR 615) in Jamesburg	
CR 616	3.02	4.86	Amboy Avenue (CR 501) and King Georges Post Road (CR 501/CR 616 Spur) on the Edison/Woodbridge township line	New Brunswick Avenue	Smith Street (CR 656) and State Street (CR 611) in Perth Amboy	
CR 616 Spur	0.19	0.31	King Georges Post Road on the Edison/Woodbridge township line	King Georges Post Road	Amboy Avenue (CR 501), King Georges Post Road (CR 501), and New Brunswick Avenue (CR 616) on the Edison/Woodbridge township line	
CR 617	7.36	11.84	Old Bridge Turnpike (CR 527) in East Brunswick	Rues Lane, Ryders Lane	George Street (Route 172) in New Brunswick	
CR 618	1.14	1.83	Route 27 in South Brunswick	Old Road	Dead end in South Brunswick	Follows the Franklin/South Brunswick township line; also known as CR 607.
CR 619	6.39	10.28	Disbrow Hill Road in Monroe Township	Butcher Road, Applegarth Road	Forsgate Drive (CR 612) in Monroe Township	Formerly extended north to Docks Corner Road (CR 698).
CR 620	0.28	0.45	Dead end in North Brunswick	Nassau Street	Georges Road (Route 171) in North Brunswick	Decommissioned
CR 621	0.17	0.27	North Feltus Street in South Amboy	5th Street	North Stevens Avenue (CR 686) in South Amboy	
CR 622	7.44	11.97	Raritan Avenue (Route 27) in Highland Park	River Road, Lincoln Boulevard, Raritan Avenue	Union Avenue (Route 28) in Middlesex	Former CR 514 Spur
CR 623	0.40	0.64	North Avenue (Route 28) and West Front Street (Route 28) on the Dunellen/Plainfield border	Jefferson Avenue	Jefferson Avenue at the Somerset County line on the Dunellen/Plainfield border	
CR 624	0.90	1.45	Smith Street (CR 656) in Woodbridge	Route 440 Connector	Fayette Street and Goodwin Street in Perth Amboy	
CR 625	5.97	9.61	Route 33 in Monroe Township	Perrineville Road	Forsgate Drive (CR 612) in Jamesburg	
CR 625 (I)	0.57	0.92	Forsgate Drive (CR 612) in Jamesburg	West Railroad Avenue	Half Acre Road (CR 615), Gatzmer Avenue (CR 522), East Railroad Avenue (CR 522) and Lincoln Avenue (CR 615) in Jamesburg	
CR 625 (II)	0.21	0.34	East Railroad Avenue (CR 522) in Jamesburg	Hooker Street	McKnight Avenue in Jamesburg	
CR 626	2.10	3.38	Aberdeen Road at the Monmouth County line in Old Bridge	Morristown Road, Matawan Road, Laurence Parkway	Route 35 in Old Bridge	
CR 627	0.17	0.27	Somerset Street on the New Brunswick/Franklin Township border	Somerset Street	Somerset Street (Mile Run Bridge) on the New Brunswick/Franklin Township border	On the New Brunswick/Franklin Township border
CR 628	0.27	0.43	Dead end in Piscataway	South 2nd Street	South 2nd Street at the Union County line in Piscataway	
CR 629	0.69	1.11	Route 440, St. Stephens Avenue, and Sunnyview Oval in Woodbridge	Crows Mill Road	King Georges Post Road (CR 501) in Woodbridge	
CR 630	1.11	1.79	US 1 in Edison	Parsonage Road	Lincoln Highway (Route 27) in Edison	
CR 630 Spur	0.07	0.11	Parsonage Road (CR 630) in Edison	Spruce Drive	Roosevelt Drive (CR 657) in Edison	Jughandle
CR 631	1.86	2.99	Marlboro Road in Old Bridge	Marlboro Road	Charles Street in Old Bridge	Formerly designated as CR 700
CR 632	2.42	3.89	River Road (CR 622) in Piscataway	Johnson Drive	River Road (CR 622) in Highland Park	Formerly part of CR 807; Johnson Park road
CR 632 (A)	0.18	0.29	Johnson Drive (CR 632) in Piscataway	Violet Drive	River Road (CR 622) in Piscataway	Formerly designated as CR 807; Johnson Park road
CR 632 (B)	0.16	0.26	Johnson Drive (CR 632) in Piscataway		River Road (CR 622) in Piscataway	Johnson Park road
CR 632 (C)	0.10	0.16	Johnson Drive (CR 632) in Piscataway	Tulip Drive	Parking lot in Piscataway	Johnson Park road
CR 632 (D)	0.06	0.10	Johnson Drive (CR 632) in Piscataway	Tulip Drive	Johnson Drive (CR 632) in Piscataway	Johnson Park road
CR 632 (E)	0.15	0.24	Johnson Drive (CR 632) in Highland Park	Rose Drive	Johnson Drive (CR 622) in Highland Park	Johnson Park road
CR 642	0.41	0.66	US 130 and Distribution Way (CR 697) in South Brunswick	Old Georges Road	US 130 in South Brunswick	
CR 643	1.07	1.72	Port Reading Avenue (CR 604) in Woodbridge	Middlesex Avenue	Middlesex Avenue on the Woodbridge/Carteret border	The remainder of Middlesex Avenue and Peter J. Sica Industrial Highway is planned to become an extension of CR 643
CR 644	0.85	1.37	French Street (Route 27) in New Brunswick	French Street	Albany Street (Route 27) and Easton Avenue (CR 527) in New Brunswick	County-maintained section of Route 27
CR 645	1.59	2.56	Old Bridge–Matawan Road (CR 516) in Old Bridge	Amboy Road	Route 34 in Old Bridge	Formerly part of CR 689
CR 646	1.05	1.69	US 1 in Woodbridge	Woodbridge Center Drive	Main Street (CR 514) in Woodbridge	
CR 647	2.53	4.07	Stelton Road (CR 529) in Piscataway	New Brunswick Avenue	West 7th Street (CR 601) on the Piscataway/South Plainfield border	
CR 648	1.51	2.43	US 1 in Edison	Ford Avenue	Amboy Avenue (CR 501) in Woodbridge	
CR 649	2.84	4.57	Garden State Parkway in Woodbridge	Wood Avenue	Inman Avenue (CR 602) on the Edison/Woodbridge township line	
CR 650	3.81	6.13	Oak Tree Road (CR 604) in Woodbridge	Middlesex Avenue, New Dover Road, Chain O'Hills Road, Avenel Street	Rahway Avenue (CR 514) in Woodbridge	Decommissioned
CR 651	1.03	1.66	New Dover Road (CR 650) in Woodbridge	Colonia Boulevard	Bramhall Road on the Woodbridge/Rahway border	Decommissioned
CR 652	1.01	1.63	Main Street (CR 514) and Rahway Avenue (CR 514) in Woodbridge	Berry Street, Woodbridge Avenue	Railroad crossing in Woodbridge	
CR 653	2.17	3.49	New Brunswick Avenue (CR 616) in Perth Amboy	Amboy Avenue	Route 35 in Woodbridge	
CR 654	0.50	0.80	Amboy Avenue (CR 653) in Perth Amboy	Maurer Road	State Street (CR 611) in Perth Amboy	Decommissioned in 2013 though a 0.16-mile (0.26 km) section is still open
CR 655	2.08	3.35	Maurer Road (CR 654) in Perth Amboy	Florida Grove Road	Convery Boulevard (Route 35) on the Perth Amboy/Woodbridge border	
CR 656	4.21	6.78	Dead end in Edison	Riverside Drive, Smith Street	Front Street in Perth Amboy	Discontinuous through the interchange of Route 440
CR 656 Spur	0.53	0.85	Raritan Center Parkway in Edison	Parkway Place	Riverside Drive (CR 656) in Woodbridge	
CR 657	2.90	4.67	Oakland Avenue on the Metuchen/Edison border	Oakwood Avenue, Maple Drive, Roosevelt Drive, Evergreen Road, Thornhall Street, Middlesex–Essex Turnpike	Green Street (CR 604) in Woodbridge	
CR 657 (I)	0.35	0.56	Maple Drive (CR 657) in Edison	Roosevelt Drive	Roosevelt Drive (CR 657) in Edison	
CR 657 (II)	0.13	0.21	Evergreen Road (CR 657) and Thornhall Street (CR 657) in Edison	Evergreen Road	Lincoln Highway (Route 27) in Edison	
CR 657 (A)	0.36	0.58	Grandview Avenue (CR 660) in Edison	Pine Drive	Roosevelt Drive (CR 657) in Edison	Roosevelt Park road
CR 657 (B)	0.48	0.77	Dead end in Edison	Lafayette Avenue	Parsonage Road (CR 630) in Edison	Roosevelt Park road
CR 657 (C)	0.07	0.11	Pine Drive (CR 657A) in Edison	Pine Drive	Roosevelt Drive (CR 657) in Edison	Roosevelt Park road
CR 657 (D)	0.42	0.68	Roosevelt Drive (CR 657) in Edison	Birch Drive	Maple Drive (CR 657) in Edison	Roosevelt Park road
CR 657 (E)	0.12	0.19	Roosevelt Drive (CR 657) in Edison	Elm Drive	Roosevelt Drive (CR 657) in Edison	Roosevelt Park road
CR 657 (F)	0.14	0.23	Roosevelt Drive (CR 657) in Edison	Elm Drive	Roosevelt Drive (CR 657) in Edison	Roosevelt Park road
CR 657 (G)	0.52	0.84	Roosevelt Drive (CR 657) in Edison	Oak Drive	Parsonage Road (CR 630) in Edison	Roosevelt Park road
CR 657 (H)	0.16	0.26	Oakwood Avenue (CR 657) in Edison		Dead end in Edison	Roosevelt Park road
CR 657 (J)	0.04	0.06	Oakwood Avenue (CR 657) in Edison	Maple Drive	Roosevelt Drive (CR 657) in Edison	Roosevelt Park road
CR 657 (K)	0.03	0.05	Roosevelt Drive (CR 657) in Edison		Parking lot in Edison	Roosevelt Park road
CR 657 (L)	0.02	0.03	Roosevelt Drive (CR 657) in Edison		Parking lot in Edison	Roosevelt Park road
CR 657 (M)	0.02	0.03	Roosevelt Drive (CR 657) in Edison		Dead end in Edison	Roosevelt Park road
CR 658	1.47	2.37	Smith Street (CR 656) in Perth Amboy	Herbert Street, Market Street, Water Street	Smith Street (CR 656) in Perth Amboy	
CR 659	0.49	0.79	Plainsboro Road (CR 535) in Cranbury	Maplewood Avenue	Half Acre Road (CR 535) in Cranbury	
CR 659 (I)	0.42	0.68	Pine Drive (CR 657C) in Edison	Birch Drive	Maple Drive (CR 657) in Edison	Now CR 657D
CR 659 (II)	0.36	0.58	Grandview Avenue (CR 660) in Edison	Pine Drive	Roosevelt Drive (CR 657) in Edison	Now CR 657A
CR 659 (III)	0.22	0.35	Oakwood Avenue (CR 657) in Edison	Maple Drive	Maple Drive (CR 657) in Edison	Now part of CR 657
CR 659 (IV)	0.52	0.84	Roosevelt Drive (CR 657) in Edison	Oak Drive	Parsonage Road (CR 630) in Edison	Now CR 657G
CR 660	1.15	1.85	CR 531 in Metuchen	Woodbridge Avenue, Grandview Avenue	US 1 in Edison	
CR 661	1.08	1.74	Plainfield Road (CR 531) and Park Avenue (CR 531) in Edison	Plainfield Road	Oak Tree Road (CR 604) in Edison	
CR 663	1.75	2.82	Hamilton Boulevard (CR 603) in South Plainfield	South Clinton Avenue, New Market Avenue, Clinton Avenue	Clinton Avenue (CR 605) and Sampton Avenue (CR 605) in South Plainfield	
CR 665	3.71	5.97	Metlars Lane (CR 609) in Piscataway	South Washington Avenue, Stelton Road, New Market Road	South Washington Avenue (CR 529) in Dunellen	
CR 667	0.69	1.11	Mill Road in Edison	Mill Road	Woodbridge Avenue (CR 514) in Edison	
CR 667 Spur	0.94	1.51	Dead end in Edison	West Patrol Road	Mill Road (CR 667) in Edison	
CR 669	0.71	1.14	Middlesex Avenue (CR 501) in Metuchen	Central Avenue	Plainfield Avenue (CR 531) and Plainfield Road (CR 531) in Metuchen	
CR 670	5.03	8.10	Washington Road (CR 535) in Sayreville	Main Street, Washington Avenue	Main Street (CR 684) in South Amboy	
CR 671	0.55	0.89	West 7th Street (CR 601) in Piscataway	Rock Avenue	Rock Avenue at the Union County line in Piscataway	Decommissioned
CR 672	2.18	3.51	George Street (CR 527) and Albany Street (Route 27) in New Brunswick	George Street	Landing Lane (CR 609) in New Brunswick	Gap in route at the interchange of Route 18
CR 673	1.19	1.92	Washington Road (CR 535) in Sayreville	Ernston Road	US 9 on the Sayreville/Old Bridge border	
CR 674	0.49	0.79	Metlars Lane (CR 609) in Piscataway	Suttons Lane	School Street in Piscataway	Decommissioned
CR 675 (I)	2.45	3.94	Washington Road (CR 535) in Sayreville	Jernee Mill Road	Bordentown Avenue (CR 615) in Sayreville	
CR 675 (II)	0.21	0.34	Dead end in Sayreville	Washington Road, Furman Avenue	Jernee Mill Road (CR 675) in Sayreville	
CR 675 (III)	0.34	0.55	Water Street (CR 675) in South River	Water Street, Causeway	Dead end in South River	
CR 675 (IV)	0.65	1.05	Main Street (CR 535) in South River	Jackson Street, Water Street	Main Street (CR 535) in South River	
CR 676	0.49	0.79	Woodbridge Avenue (CR 514) on the Highland Park/Edison border	Duclos Lane	Lincoln Highway (Route 27) in Edison	Formerly extended south to US 1 along Riverview Avenue and north to Truman Drive along Suttons Lane
CR 677	3.86	6.21	Main Street (CR 615) in East Brunswick	River Road, Whitehead Avenue, Ferry Street, Reid Street, East Prospect Street	Old Bridge Turnpike (CR 527) and West Prospect Street on the South River/East Brunswick border	
CR 678	0.80	1.29	Prospect Street in Dunellen	Walnut Street	West 7th Street (CR 601) in Piscataway	
CR 679	4.16	6.69	US 130 in South Brunswick	Georges Road	US 130 in South Brunswick	Now part of CR 697 and CR 697 Spur
CR 680	0.99	1.59	Route 27 on the North Brunswick/New Brunswick border	How Lane	Livingston Avenue (Route 26) in North Brunswick	
CR 681	0.68	1.09	CR 522 in South Brunswick	Kingston Lane	Georges Road (CR 697) in South Brunswick	
CR 682	1.05	1.69	Route 27 on the North Brunswick/South Brunswick township line	Finnegans Lane	US 1 on the North Brunswick/South Brunswick township line	
CR 683	2.03	3.27	Scudders Mill Road (CR 614) in Plainsboro	Schalks Crossing Road	Ridge Road in South Brunswick	Formerly extended south to Plainsboro Road
CR 684	1.73	2.78	US 9 and Route 35 in South Amboy	Main Street	US 9 and Route 35 in Sayreville	
CR 685	0.40	0.64	Old Trenton Road (CR 535) and South Main Street (CR 539) in Cranbury	Old Trenton Road	US 130 in Cranbury	Formerly extended south along South Main Street to US 130
CR 686	1.10	1.77	Main Street (CR 684) in South Amboy	4th Street, North Stevens Avenue, Ridgeway Avenue, Scott Avenue	Main Street (CR 684) in Sayreville	
CR 686 Spur	0.24	0.39	US 9/Route 35 and Raritan Street (CR 535) in South Amboy	Raritan Street	Ridgeway Avenue (CR 686) in South Amboy	
CR 687	1.60	2.57	Old Bridge–Matawan Road (CR 516) in Old Bridge	Cottrell Road	Route 34 in Old Bridge	
CR 688	0.95	1.53	Ramps from Route 35 in Sayreville	South Pine Avenue	Bordentown Avenue (CR 615) in South Amboy	Decommissioned
CR 689	1.45	2.33	Route 34 in Old Bridge	Morristown Road, Cliffwood Road	Cliffwood Avenue (CR 6A) at the Monmouth County line in Old Bridge	
CR 690	0.91	1.46	Texas Road (CR 520) and Marlboro Road (CR 520) in Old Bridge	Texas Road	Texas Road at the Monmouth County line in Old Bridge	
CR 691	1.32	2.12	Livingston Avenue (Route 26) and Nassau Street on the New Brunswick/North Brunswick border	Livingston Avenue	New Street in New Brunswick	
CR 692	1.22	1.96	River Road (CR 622) in Highland Park	Cedar Lane	Kilmer Road in Edison	
CR 693	1.10	1.77	Jersey Avenue (Route 91) and Van Dyke Avenue in New Brunswick	Jersey Avenue	French Street (Route 27) in New Brunswick	
CR 694	0.83	1.34	Old Georges Road (CR 695) in North Brunswick	Church Lane	Riva Avenue in East Brunswick	
CR 695	1.41	2.27	Blackhorse Lane in North Brunswick	Old Georges Road	US 130 in North Brunswick	Three separate segments separated by US 130
CR 696	0.49	0.79	US 130 in North Brunswick	Apple Orchard Lane	County Workhouse in North Brunswick	
CR 697	4.32	6.95	US 130 in South Brunswick	Georges Road, Distribution Way	US 130 and Old Georges Road (CR 642) in South Brunswick	
CR 697 Spur	0.25	0.40	Georges Road (CR 697) in South Brunswick	Georges Road	US 130 in South Brunswick	Former CR 679
CR 698	0.42	0.68	Possum Hollow Road in Monroe Township	Docks Corner Road, Dayton Road	Gatzmer Avenue (CR 522) and Rhode Hall Road (CR 522) in Jamesburg	Formerly extended west to Cranbury–South River Road (CR 535).
CR 699	0.71	1.14	Cottrell Road (CR 687) in Old Bridge	Spring Hill Road	Route 34 in Old Bridge	
CR 700	2.50	4.02	Route 18 in Old Bridge	Marlboro Road, Charles Street	Marsad Drive in Old Bridge	Decommissioned, now partially CR 631
CR 701	1.17	1.88	Metlars Lane (CR 609) in Piscataway	Avenue E	Road 1 (CR 702) in Edison	Decommissioned
CR 702	0.74	1.19	Cedar Lane (CR 692) in Edison	Road 1	Dead end in Edison	Decommissioned
CR 807	1.18	1.90	River Road (CR 622) and Cedar Lane (CR 692) in Highland Park	Johnson Park Road, Violet Drive	River Road (CR 622) in Piscataway	Decommissioned, now CR 632
CR 1605	0.03	0.05	Parking lot in Highland Park		Donaldson Drive (CR 1640) in Highland Park	Donaldson Park road
CR 1625	0.08	0.13	Dead end in Highland Park		Donaldson Drive (CR 1650) in Highland Park	Donaldson Park road
CR 1630	0.10	0.16	Riverview Avenue in Highland Park	Donaldson Drive	Donaldson Drive (CR 1640) in Highland Park	Donaldson Park road
CR 1640	0.66	1.06	Parking lot in Highland Park	Lily Drive, Donaldson Drive, Tulip Drive	Parking lot in Highland Park	Donaldson Park road
CR 1650	0.36	0.58	Lily Drive (CR 1640) in Highland Park	Donaldson Drive	Tulip Drive (CR 1640) in Highland Park	Donaldson Park road
CR 1665	0.07	0.11	Donaldson Drive (CR 1630) in Highland Park	Donaldson Drive	South 3rd Avenue in Highland Park	Donaldson Park road
CR 2110	0.12	0.19	Parking lot in Woodbridge	South Middlesex Avenue	South Middlesex Avenue in Woodbridge	Merrill Park road
CR 2120	0.57	0.92	Middlesex Turnpike in Woodbridge	Middlesex Turnpike, Fairview Avenue	Outlook Avenue (CR 2130) in Woodbridge	Merrill Park road
CR 2130	0.06	0.10	Fairview Avenue (CR 2120) in Woodbridge	Outlook Avenue	Outlook Avenue in Woodbridge	Merrill Park road
CR 2135	0.05	0.08	Fairview Avenue (CR 2120) in Woodbridge	Apple Drive	South Middlesex Avenue (CR 2110) in Woodbridge	Merrill Park road
CR 2138	0.02	0.03	Middlesex Turnpike (CR 2120) in Woodbridge		CR 2165 in Woodbridge	Merrill Park road
CR 2140	0.16	0.26	Fairview Avenue (CR 2120) in Woodbridge	Cherry Street	Parking lot in Woodbridge	Merrill Park road
CR 2145	0.06	0.10	Parking lot in Woodbridge	Merrill Road	Fairview Avenue (CR 2120) in Woodbridge	Merrill Park road
CR 2165	0.13	0.21	Parking lot in Woodbridge		Fairview Avenue (CR 2120) in Woodbridge	Merrill Park road
