= County Route 522 (New Jersey) =

County highway in New Jersey, U.S.

County Route 522
- CR 522 highlighted in red

Route information
- Length: 20.9 mi (33.6 km)
- Existed: January 1, 1953–present

Major junctions
- West end: Route 27 in South Brunswick
- US 1 in South Brunswick; US 130 in South Brunswick; CR 535 on the South Brunswick/Monroe township line; CR 527 in Englishtown; US 9 in Freehold Township
- East end: CR 537 in Freehold Borough

Location
- Country: United States
- State: New Jersey
- Counties: Middlesex, Monmouth

Highway system
- County routes in New Jersey; 500-series routes
← CR 521	→ CR 523

County Route 522 (CR 522) is a county highway in the U.S. state of New Jersey. The highway extends 21 miles (34 km) from Route 27 in South Brunswick to West Main Street (CR 537) in Freehold Borough.

== Route description ==
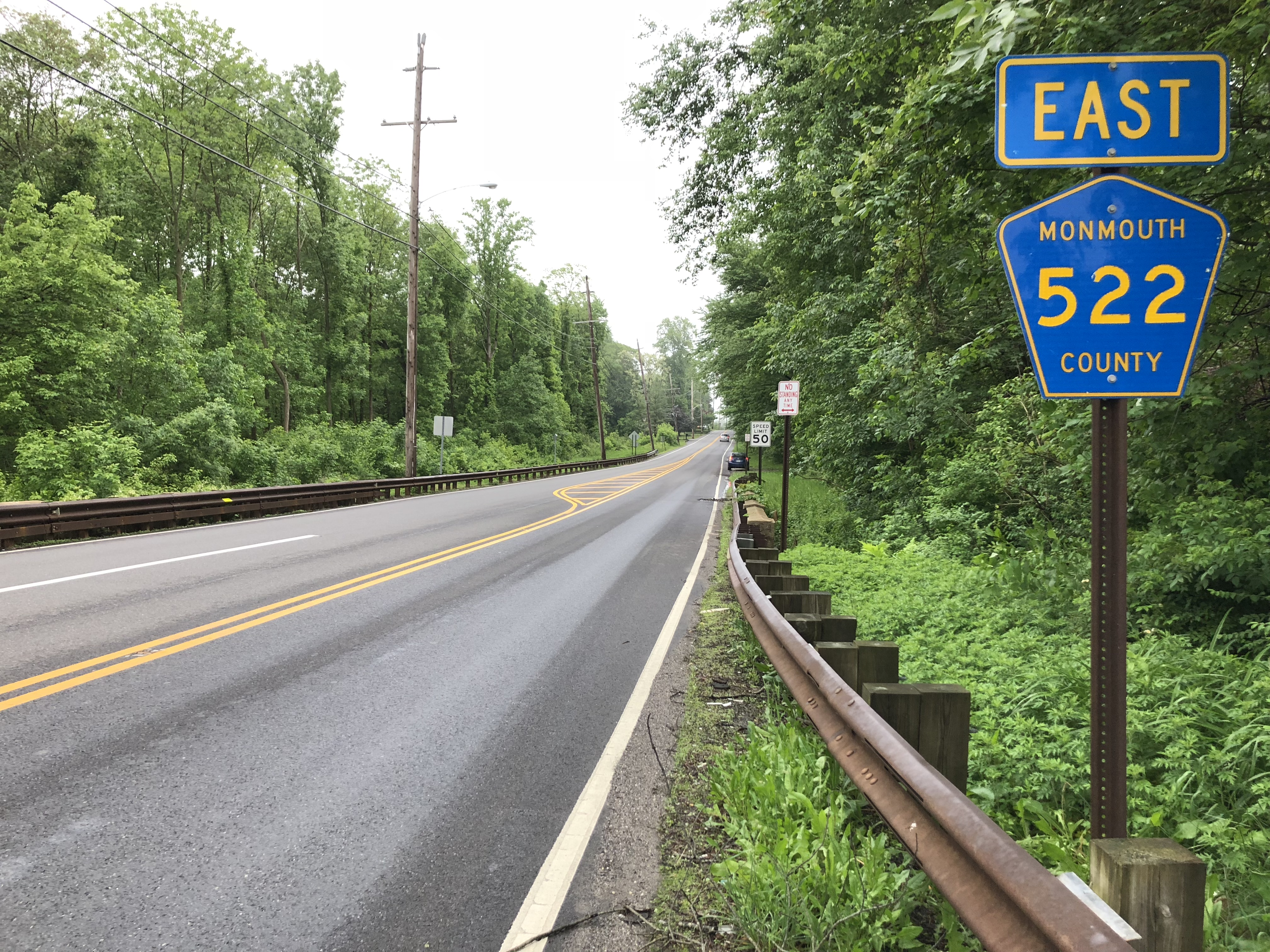
CR 522 eastbound in Freehold Township

CR 522 begins at an intersection of Route 27 on the border of South Brunswick, Middlesex County and Franklin Township, Somerset County. Unsigned, it travels along the divided Promenade Boulevard, where it provides access to numerous condominium developments. It crosses the intersection of US 1, then passes through forested areas near a few residential subdivisions, turning southeast and passing over Amtrak's Northeast Corridor. Following the bridge, the route enters residential areas. It intersects with Kingston Lane (CR 681) and Georges Road (CR 697) before coming to an intersection of US 130. A short section of CR 522 on the east side of US 130 intersects with Fresh Ponds Road. The main portion of CR 522 turns south to form a concurrency with US 130 on a four-lane divided highway, passing businesses. CR 522 splits from US 130 at an interchange and heads east on two-lane, undivided Ridge Road, running past distribution warehouses and farms. After passing over the New Jersey Turnpike (I-95), the route continues to an intersection of Cranbury-South River Road (CR 535).

The road enters Monroe Township and becomes Rhode Hall Road, passing through agricultural areas before turning south into wooded residential areas. CR 522 crosses into Jamesburg. It reaches the intersection of Dayton Road (CR 698), at which point the route heads southeast on Gatzmer Avenue and passes under Conrail Shared Assets Operations' Amboy Secondary before crossing the intersection of Lincoln Avenue (CR 615). At this point, CR 522 bears left onto East Railroad Avenue and runs to the east of the Freehold Industrial Track railroad line operated by the Delaware and Raritan River Railroad through residential and commercial areas in the center of Jamesburg before intersecting with Forsgate Drive (CR 612) and forms a brief concurrency with CR 612 near Lake Manalapan before its splits from CR 522. Past Pergola Avenue (CR 612), the road continues southeast on Bucklew Avenue through neighborhoods before leaving Jamesburg for Monroe Township again. In this area, the route passes through a mix of woods and residential subdivisions, intersecting with Hoffman Station Road (CR 614) and Spotswood-Englishtown Road (CR 613). At the intersection with the latter, the road becomes simply Route 522.

A short distance later, CR 522 enters Manalapan in Monmouth County, becoming Wood Avenue and passes through wooded areas with some homes before entering Englishtown. In Englishtown, the route passes homes and turns east onto Water Street, reaching an intersection of Main Street (CR 527). CR 522 turns south onto CR 527, and the two routes head south on Main Street past residences and businesses. CR 522 splits from CR 527 by turning east onto Tennent Avenue. The road crosses back into Manalapan and simply renamed Route 522, heading southeast past residential neighborhoods and a tract of Monmouth Battlefield State Park. After crossing the intersection of Tennent Road/Main Street (CR 3), the route passes through fields and woods within Monmouth Battlefield State Park. Within the park, CR 522 crosses into Freehold Township and turns east immediately to the north of the Freehold Industrial Track. The road comes to an interchange with US 9, at which point CR 522 is briefly a four-lane divided highway. Past this interchange, the route heads into residential and commercial areas as a two-lane road. Upon entering Freehold Borough, CR 522 becomes municipally maintained Thockmorton Street, which turns southeast into residential areas. At the Monmouth Avenue intersection, the road heads into Downtown Freehold, where CR 522 ends at the intersection of West Main Street (CR 537).

== History ==
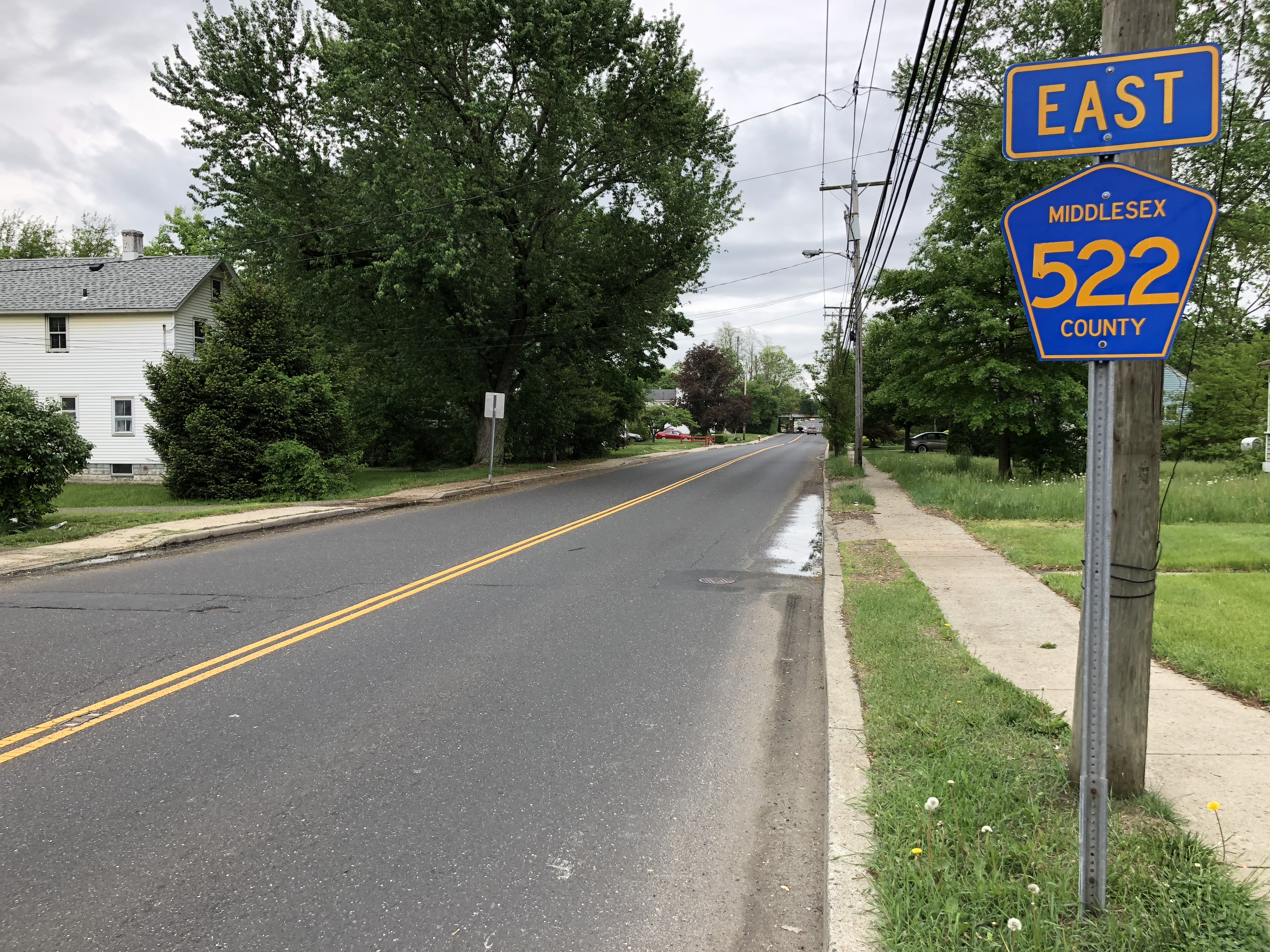
View east along CR 522 at Pergola Street in Jamesburg

The Freehold and Englishtown Turnpike was chartered in 1863 to run from Freehold to Englishtown. On June 12, 1901, all of the turnpike between Broad Street, Freehold and Main Street (CR 527), Englishtown was purchased by the Monmouth County Board of Chosen Freeholders and incorporated into the county highway system.

Between US 1 and US 130, CR 522 formerly followed Ridge Road. The new alignment between US 1 and US 130 was fully opened by 2001. The county road had also once extended west to Route 27 in Kingston via Ridge Road and Heathcote Road. In 2025, the new alignment of CR 522 was extended east of US-130 to intersect with Fresh Ponds Road in South Brunswick.

== Major intersections ==
County	Location	mi	km	Destinations	Notes
Middlesex	South Brunswick	0.0	0.0	Route 27 (Lincoln Highway) – Princeton, New Brunswick	
Middlesex	South Brunswick	1.3	2.1	US 1 – Trenton, New Brunswick	
Middlesex	South Brunswick	5.3	8.5	US 130 north / Fresh Ponds Road – New Brunswick	West end of the overlap with US 130
Middlesex	South Brunswick	5.7	9.2	US 130 south / Ridge Road – Hightstown	Interchange, east end of the overlap with US 130
Middlesex	South Brunswick–Monroe township line	8.0	12.9	CR 535 (Cranbury–South River Road) to I-95 / N.J. Turnpike	
Monmouth	Englishtown	15.7	25.3	CR 527 north (Main Street)	West end of the overlap with CR 527
Monmouth	Englishtown	15.83	25.48	CR 527 south (Main Street)	East end of the overlap with CR 527
Monmouth	Freehold Township	19.8	31.9	US 9 – South Amboy, Lakewood	Interchange
Monmouth	Freehold Borough	20.9	33.6	CR 537 (West Main Street)	
1.000 mi = 1.609 km; 1.000 km = 0.621 mi: Concurrency terminus
