= County Route 535 (New Jersey) =

County highway in New Jersey, U.S.

County Route 535
- CR 535 highlighted in red

Route information
- Length: 32.3 mi (52.0 km)
- Existed: January 1, 1953–present

Major junctions
- South end: CR 635 in Trenton
- I-295 in Hamilton; US 130 in Cranbury; I-95 / N.J. Turnpike / Route 32 in South Brunswick; Route 18 in East Brunswick
- North end: US 9 / Route 35 in South Amboy

Location
- Country: United States
- State: New Jersey
- Counties: Mercer, Middlesex

Highway system
- County routes in New Jersey; 500-series routes
← CR 534	→ CR 536

County Route 535 (CR 535) is a county highway in the U.S. state of New Jersey. The highway extends 32.3 miles (52.0 km) from North Logan Avenue/South Logan Avenue (where it becomes CR 635), at the boundary between Trenton and Hamilton in Mercer County to an interchange with US 9/Route 35 in South Amboy, Middlesex County.

The road serves as the main street through the communities of Cranbury, South River and Sayreville, while also passing through rural areas on the outskirts of Mercer and southern Middlesex counties. At various points, it is locally known as East State Street, East State Street Extension, Nottingham Way, Edinburg Road, Old Trenton Road, South Main Street, North Main Street, Plainsboro Road, Maplewood Avenue, Half Acre Road, South River Road, Cranbury-South River Road, Cranbury Road, Main Street, Washington Road, and Raritan Street.

== Route description ==
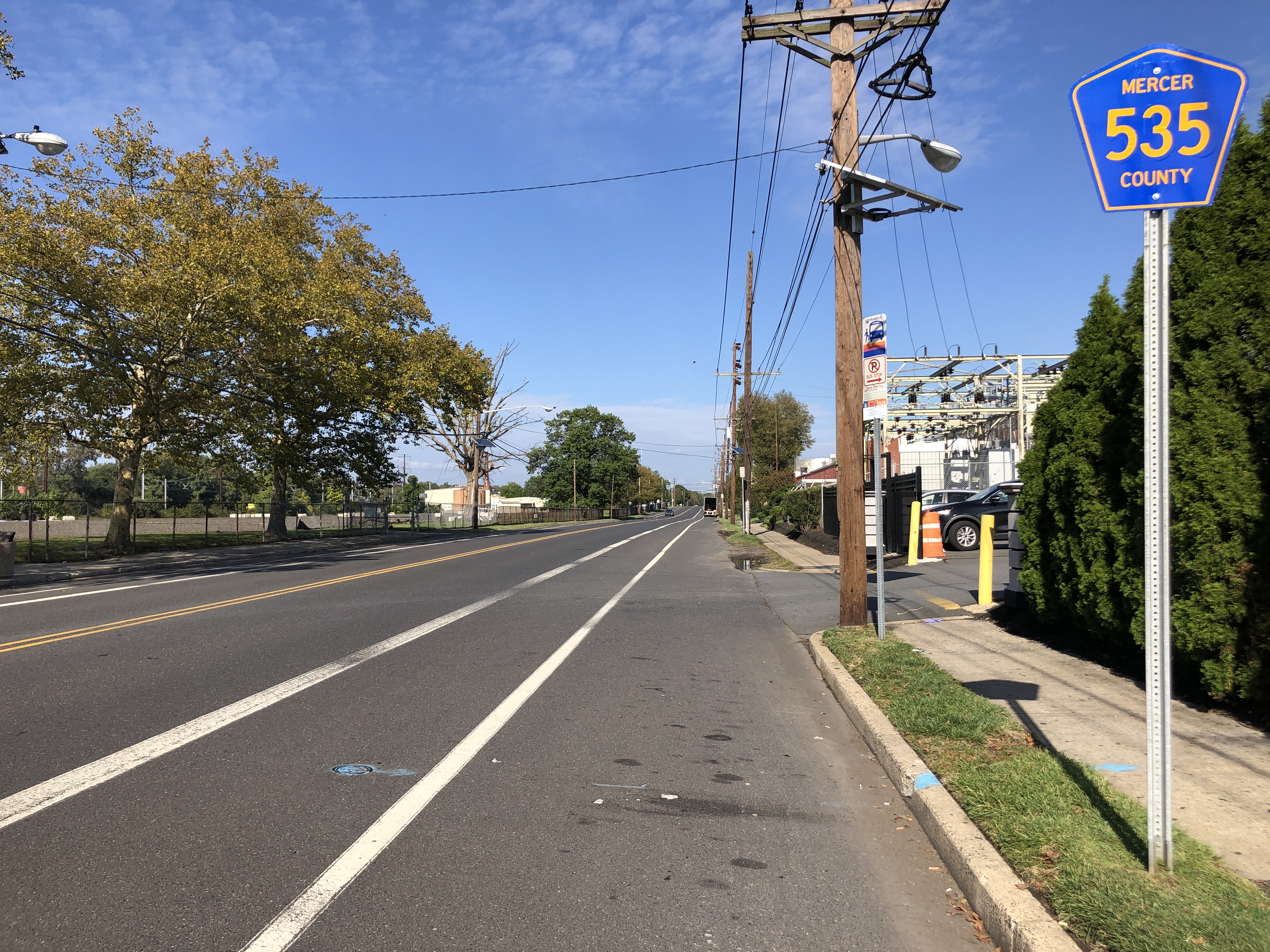
CR 535 eastbound in Hamilton Township

The designation of CR 535 picks up East State Street at the Trenton city line and heads northeast into the Bromley neighborhood of Hamilton. It parallels Amtrak's Northeast Corridor line between both municipalities' respective train stations before abruptly turning southeast at 1.9 miles (3.1 km), an intersection with Klockner Road. Now the East State Street Extension and maintained by Hamilton, CR 535 meets I-295 with limited access at exit 64. Traffic traveling southbound on CR 535 (traveling geographically north for this brief stretch) has a ramp leading to I-295 north toward US 1, while southbound traffic on the freeway can exit onto CR 535 north. From here, CR 535 continues toward Nottingham Way (CR 652), and turns left onto it, about 700 feet (210 m) east of where Route 33 merges onto Nottingham Way. County maintenance resumes at this point and CR 535 stays on this road for just 0.1 miles (0.16 km) before reaching a five-way intersection of CR 533 (Quakerbridge Road north of the intersection, White Horse–Mercerville Road south of it) and Nottingham Way, which is CR 618 as it travels southeast away from the intersection toward Hamilton Square. Having regained its northeast direction, CR 535 moves through this intersection and becomes Edinburg Road. At a traffic signal with Paxson Avenue, the road widens to two lanes in each direction. It leaves Hamilton for West Windsor, and bumps up against Mercer County Community College on the left. Just beyond the college is Mercer County Park, which is accessible through South Post Road (CR 602) or through the park's official west entrance after CR 535's reduction to one lane each way. Just beyond the park entrance, the route intersects with Robbinsville-Edinburg Road (CR 526). CR 535 forms a short concurrency with that route, which comes from Robbinsville to the south. Less than one-quarter mile (0.40 km) later, CR 526 turns due north again on Edinburg Road and heads for Princeton Junction while CR 641 travels southeast on Windsor Road. CR 535 continues to the northeast as Old Trenton Road, crossing into East Windsor. In East Windsor, it intersects with Princeton-Hightstown Road (CR 571), with the entrance to Route 133 visible to the right. CR 535 crosses the Millstone River and into Middlesex County.

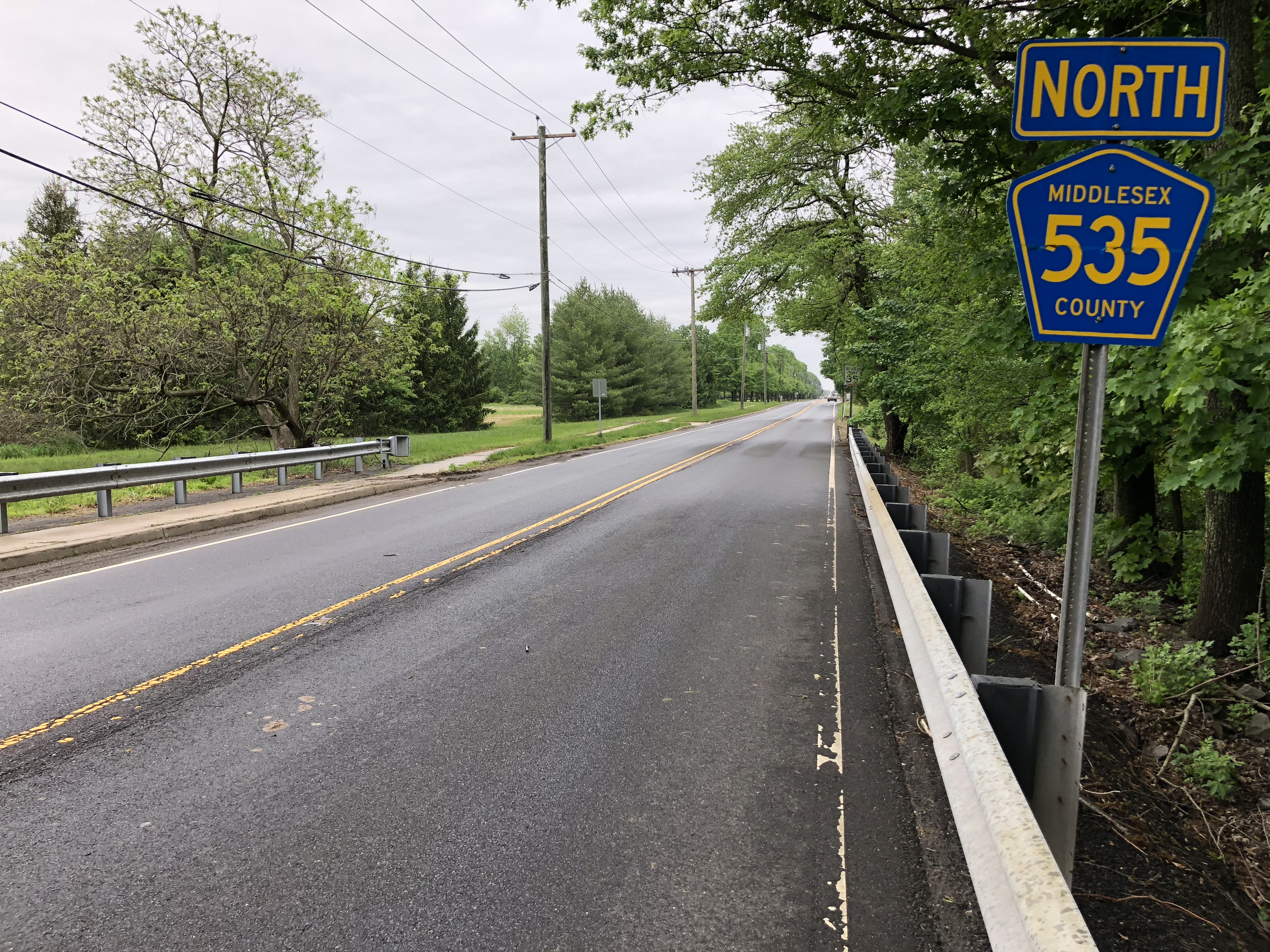
CR 535 northbound in Cranbury Township

CR 535 is now traversing Cranbury, traveling for a just under three miles (4.8 km) before reaching the township's Main Street. It turns left toward the downtown area, while CR 539 comes from the right on South Main Street and ends while CR 685 continues east on Old Trenton Road to its terminus at US 130. Once through Cranbury, CR 535 continues north on South Main Street, becomes North Main Street, turns right onto Plainsboro Road, turns left onto Maplewood Avenue, another right onto Half Acre Road, and shortly thereafter, merges into another short concurrency, this time with US 130. After less than one-tenth mile (0.16 km), it breaks off to the right, taking a north-by-northeast path toward the New Jersey Turnpike and the Lower Raritan River Valley while the southbound direction follows the short concurrency with US 130 and turns slightly southwest on Maplewood Avenue.

CR 535 enters South Brunswick. Though signed at various points as Cranbury-South River Road, South River Road and Cranbury Road, it is officially only the latter. It meets Route 32, providing access to the Turnpike as it passes to the right. Originally all traffic to and from the Turnpike's exit 8A used Route 32, but vehicles leaving the Turnpike and not traveling towards Jamesburg now exit onto CR 535. CR 535 runs along the boundary between South Brunswick and Monroe townships and then crosses under the Turnpike. It leaves the border for a short stretch starting at an intersection of Ridge Road/Rhode Hall Road (CR 522), then returns to what is now the township line with East Brunswick for one and a half miles (2.4 km). Later it enters East Brunswick completely.

CR 535 is one of the main thoroughfares of East Brunswick, along with Route 18, Ryders Lane (CR 617), and Dunhams Corner Road. The latter branches off at the same point CR 535 moves all the way into the township, banks hard to the right at East Brunswick Community Park just shy of the Turnpike, then rejoins CR 535. CR 535 intersects Ryders Lane, passes East Brunswick High School on the right, then approaches a complex interchange with Route 18, providing access to New Brunswick and the Turnpike at exit 9 to the northwest, Old Bridge and Shore Points to the south, and Spotswood via Summerhill Road (CR 613). CR 535 itself continues north and crosses into South River at the intersection of Old Bridge Turnpike (CR 527), becoming Main Street. CR 535 crosses into Sayreville and re-enters South River. CR 535 crosses the South River via the Veteran's Memorial Bridge into Sayreville. Though Main Street (CR 670) breaks off, Washington Road serves the more densely populated southern half of the borough (through the community of Parlin), as well as Sayreville War Memorial High School and Sayreville Middle School. CR 535 enters the outskirts of South Amboy though it comes up just short of the border between the two municipalities. One mile (1.6 km) later, it crosses underneath the Garden State Parkway and reaches its former northern terminus, an intersection with the other end of Sayreville's Main Street. CR 535 becomes Raritan Street continues another mile to enter South Amboy and ends an interchange with the concurrency of US 9 and Route 35 on approach to the Edison Bridge and the Victory Bridge, respectively. Raritan Street continues ahead through South Amboy as CR 686 Spur.

== Major intersections ==
County	Location	mi	km	Destinations	Notes
Mercer	Trenton	0.0	0.0	CR 635 (E State St) / N Logan Ave/S Logan Ave	Southern terminus
Mercer	Hamilton Township	2.5	4.0	I-295 north	Southbound exit and northbound entrance; Exit 64 (I-295)
Mercer	Hamilton Township	3.4	5.5	CR 533 (Quakerbridge Rd/White Horse–Mercerville Rd) to Route 33 – Lawrenceville, Bordentown CR 618 (Nottingham Way)	
Mercer	West Windsor	7.4	11.9	CR 526 east (Robbinsville–Edinburg Rd) – Robbinsville	South end of the overlap with CR 526
Mercer	West Windsor	7.6	12.2	CR 526 west (Edinburg Rd) CR 641 east (Windsor Rd)	North end of the overlap with CR 526 Western terminus of CR 641
Mercer	East Windsor	11.0	17.7	CR 571 (Princeton–Hightstown Rd) to I-95 / N.J. Turnpike – Princeton, Hightstown	
Middlesex	Cranbury	13.5	21.7	CR 539 south (S Main St) CR 685 east (Old Trenton Rd)	Northern terminus of CR 539 Western terminus of CR 685
Middlesex	Cranbury	14.8	23.8	US 130 south – Camden	South end of the overlap with US 130
Middlesex	Cranbury	14.9	24.0	US 130 north – New Brunswick	North end of the overlap with US 130
Middlesex	South Brunswick	17.4	28.0	I-95 / N.J. Turnpike / Route 32 to US 130 – So. Brunswick, Jamesburg	Exit 8A (I-95/N.J. Turnpike)
Middlesex	South Brunswick	19.6	31.5	CR 522 (Rhode Hall Rd/Ridge Rd)	
Middlesex	East Brunswick	25.4– 25.7	40.9– 41.4	Route 18 to I-95 / N.J. Turnpike – New Brunswick, Old Bridge CR 613 south (Summerhill Rd) – Spotswood	Interchange
Middlesex	South River	25.9	41.7	CR 527 (Old Bridge Tpk)	
Middlesex	South Amboy	32.2– 32.3	51.8– 52.0	US 9 / Route 35 to I-95 / N.J. Turnpike / G.S. Parkway	Interchange; northern terminus
1.000 mi = 1.609 km; 1.000 km = 0.621 mi: Concurrency terminus; Incomplete access
