= Edgewood Road Bridge =

Bridge over the New Jersey Turnpike in Leonia, New Jersey

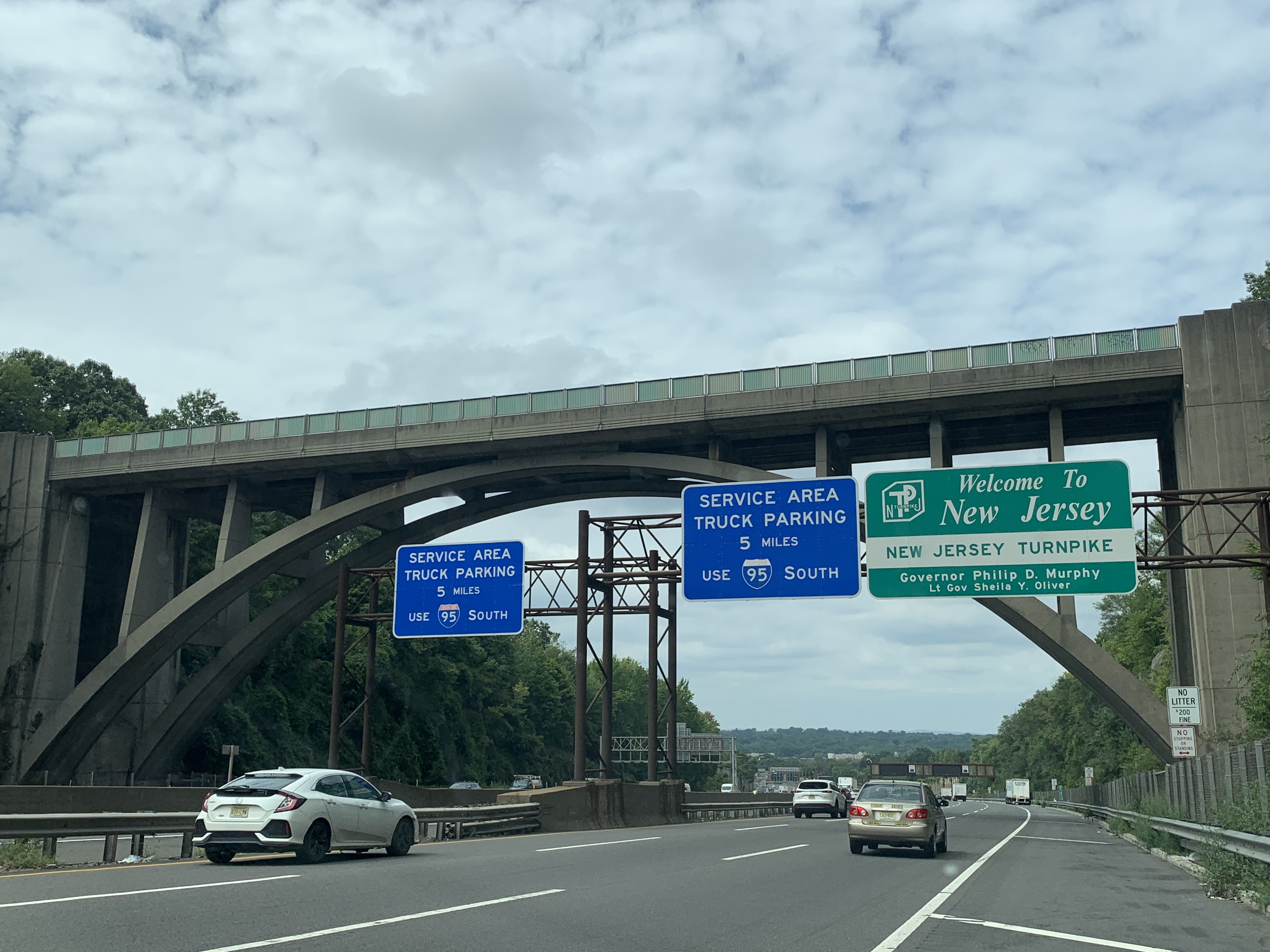
- I-95 and NJ Turnpike southbound, with the bridge and sign over it
- Coordinates: 40.8681521°N 73.9764482°W
- Carries: Edgewood Road & Sidewalks
- Crosses: I-95 / N.J. Turnpike
- Locale: Leonia, New Jersey and Englewood, New Jersey

Characteristics
- Design: Deck arch bridge
- No. of lanes: 2

History
- Opened: 1962

Location
- Interactive map of Edgewood Road Bridge

The Edgewood Road Bridge is an overpass in the U.S. state of New Jersey that runs above Interstate 95 (New Jersey Turnpike) on the border of Leonia and Englewood in Bergen County, 1.2 miles (1.9 km) away from the George Washington Bridge that connects New Jersey to New York City.

== Design ==
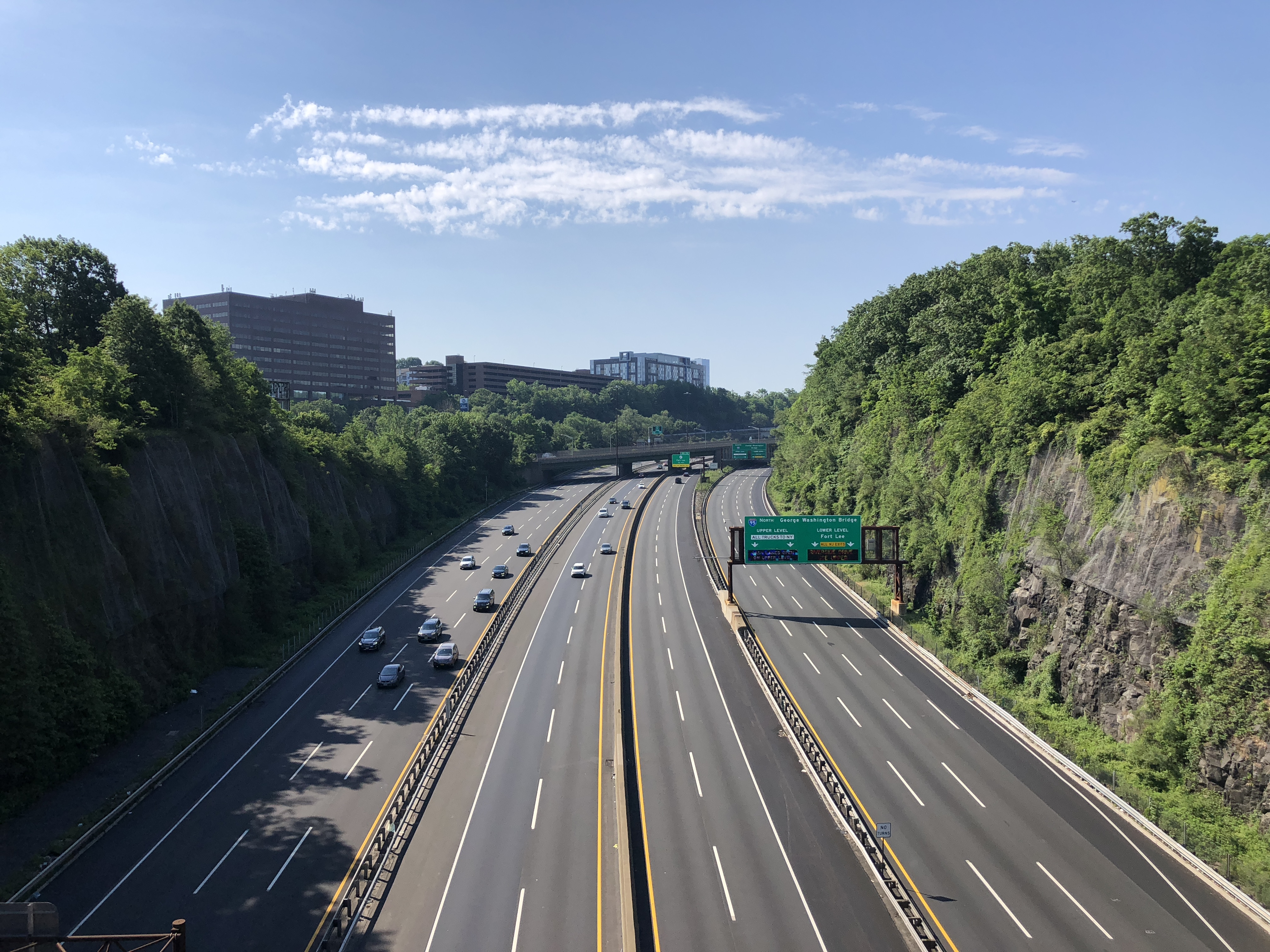
I-95 and NJ Turnpike northbound from atop the bridge

Designed similarly to the Alexander Hamilton Bridge across the Harlem River, the bridge stands out amongst commuters because of its location and iconic architecture. For long-distance travelers traveling to or from New York, the bridge is one of the first things they see entering New Jersey, or one of the last things they see before entering New York. In addition, when traveling southbound, away from the city, there is a sign welcoming drivers to New Jersey and the New Jersey Turnpike highway directly below the bridge, adding to the scenery. Prior to the 21st century, there also used to be the seal of New Jersey on both sides of the bridge, also adding to the scenery aspect. The road on the bridge is part of Edgewood Road, a street that connects residential communities in Leonia, Englewood, and Fort Lee separated by the I-95 highway. It also carries a pair of sidewalks for pedestrians and cyclists.

While the borough of Leonia passed an act in 2018 banning non-Leonia residents from most residential streets in the morning and evening hours, Edgewood Road and the bridge was not included because of its connection to nearby Route 4 and being one of three crossings of the Turnpike/I-95 in between I-80 and Route 4; the other two being Grand Avenue (Route 93/CR 501) and Broad Avenue.

Because of this, the Edgewood Road Bridge provides a throughway for residents to get to and from Route 4, while avoiding the considerably more busier other roads that cross the highway. Edgewood Road intersects Jones Road at its northern end, and the latter road has two separate interchanges with Route 4 (one of which being via Kenwood Street). Route 4, a major highway, leads into the George Washington Bridge to the east, and central Bergen County and Paterson to the west, so this bridge provides residents a shortcut to the highway.
