= New Jersey Route 32 =

State highway in New Jersey, US

Route 32
- Forsgate Drive

Route information
- Maintained by NJDOT
- Length: 1.18 mi (1.90 km)
- Existed: 1964 (on current routing)–present

Major junctions
- West end: US 130 in South Brunswick
- I-95 Toll / N.J. Turnpike / CR 535 at the South Brunswick–Monroe Township line
- East end: CR 612 in Monroe Township

Location
- Country: United States
- State: New Jersey
- Counties: Middlesex

Highway system
- New Jersey State Highway Routes; Interstate; US; State; Scenic Byways
← Route 31	→ Route 33

Route 32 is an arterial state highway in Middlesex County, New Jersey, United States. The route is a 1.18-mile-long (1.90 km) highway along Forsgate Drive that connects U.S. Route 130 (US 130) in South Brunswick Township and the New Jersey Turnpike (Interstate 95, I-95) at exit 8A in Monroe Township. Despite the short length, it is an important artery that connects not only traffic between the Turnpike and US 130, but traffic to County Route 535 (CR 535). The right-of-way on Forsgate continues eastward as County Route 612 (CR 612). Route 32 was first designated in 1964 along Forsgate Drive and was proposed to become part of Route 92 along its entire alignment.

== Route description ==
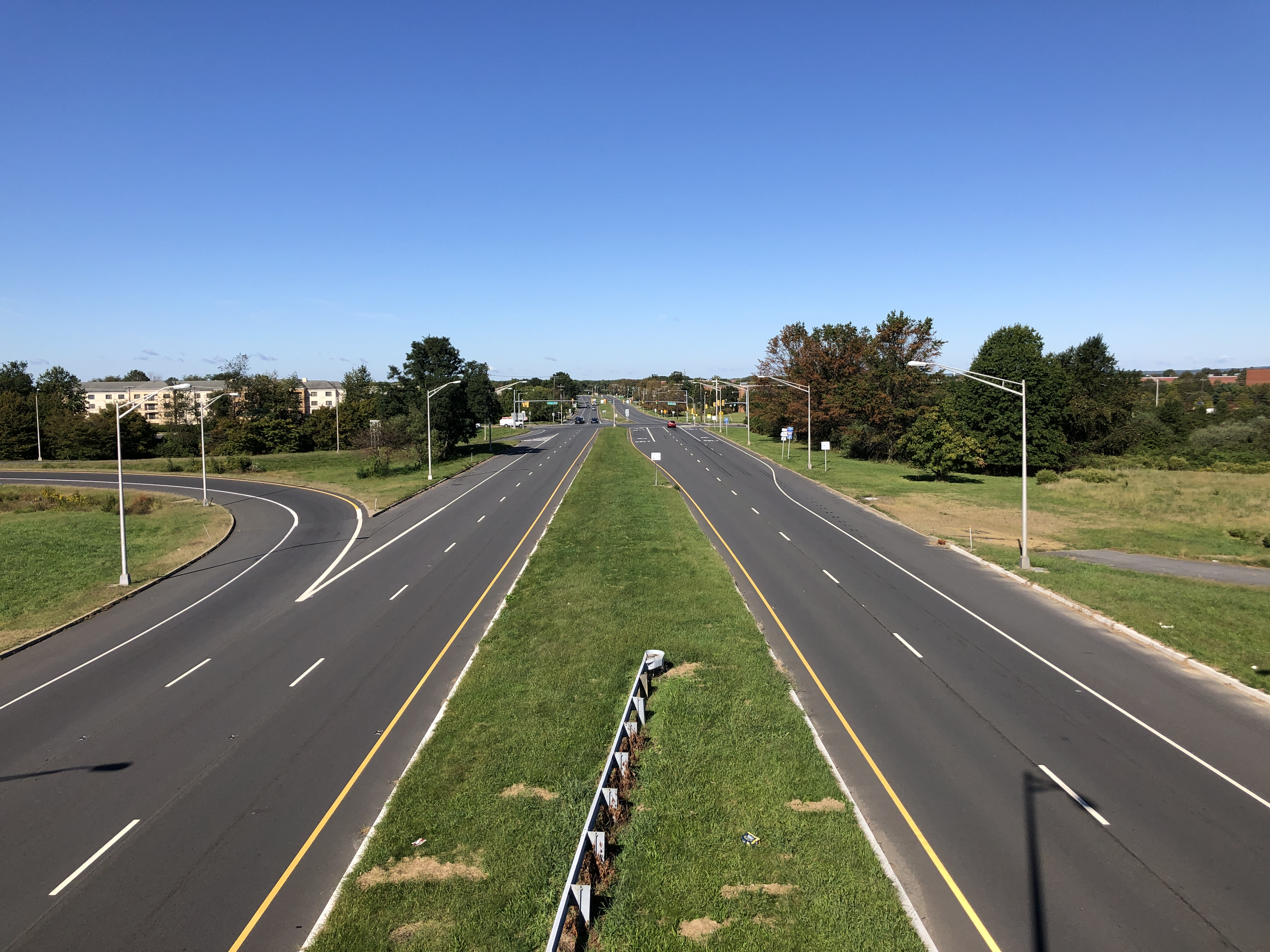
Route 32 westbound at the New Jersey Turnpike (I-95) interchange in Monroe Township

Route 32 begins at a partial interchange with US 130 in South Brunswick Township. The route heads eastward, running along access ramps from US 130 and the local park and ride serving Coach USA buses to New York City. Heading onto the mainline Route 32, the highway receives the moniker of Forsgate Drive. Intersecting with a U-turn ramp from the westbound lanes, the highway serves the area as a four-lane industrial arterial. Route 32 heads further east, passing through industrial areas and local commercial headquarters. A short distance later, the highway intersects with Herrod Drive and Commerce Drive, both of which serve the local industry. Forsgate Drive continues eastward as the arterial, intersecting with CR 535 (Cranbury–South River Road). From here, Route 32 enters Monroe Township and begins serving interchange 8A on the New Jersey Turnpike (I-95). A partial trumpet interchange, exit 8A serves access to CR 535 (for drivers heading to Route 32 westbound) and Route 32 eastbound. After serving another local industry, Route 32 crosses over the four-sectioned mainline of the turnpike, where the designation ends. The road continues east as CR 612.

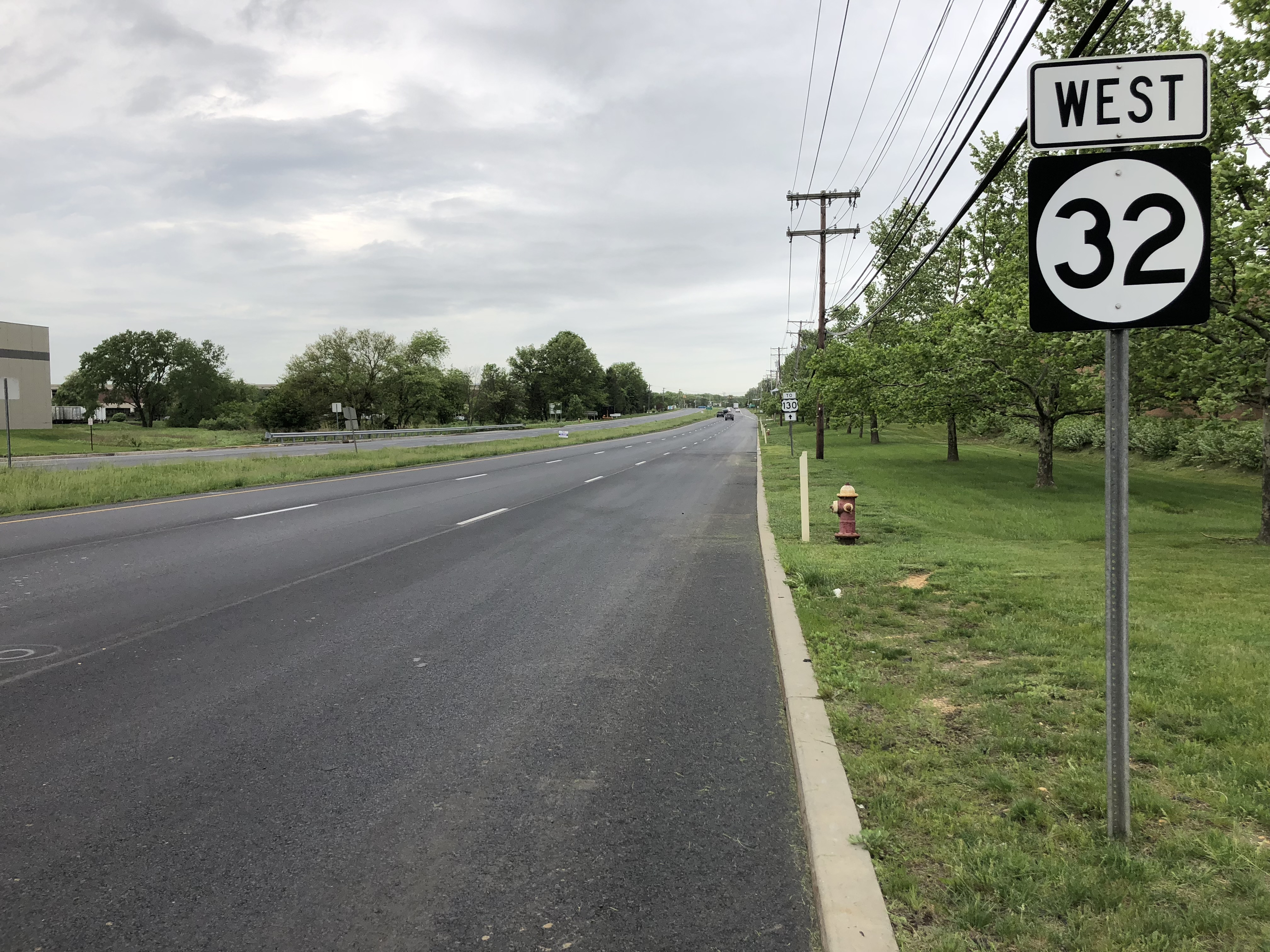
View west along Route 32 at CR 535 in South Brunswick Township

== History ==
The alignment of Route 32 was first designated in 1964, when the state took over jurisdiction of a highway from US 130 in South Brunswick, eastward along Forsgate Drive to the intersection with CR 522 and CR 535 in Monroe Township. Exit 8A originally ended at a T-intersection with Route 32 which was modified to a trumpet interchange after 1987. This originally featured an exit ramp from the tollgate to Route 32 west, which was later changed due to heavy congestion at the ramp. The turnpike ramp to Route 32 westbound was closed off but leaving most of the old pavement in place, creating a stub ramp. In its place, a new, two-lane ramp to CR 535 was built. Motorists must now take CR 535 south to access Route 32 westbound.

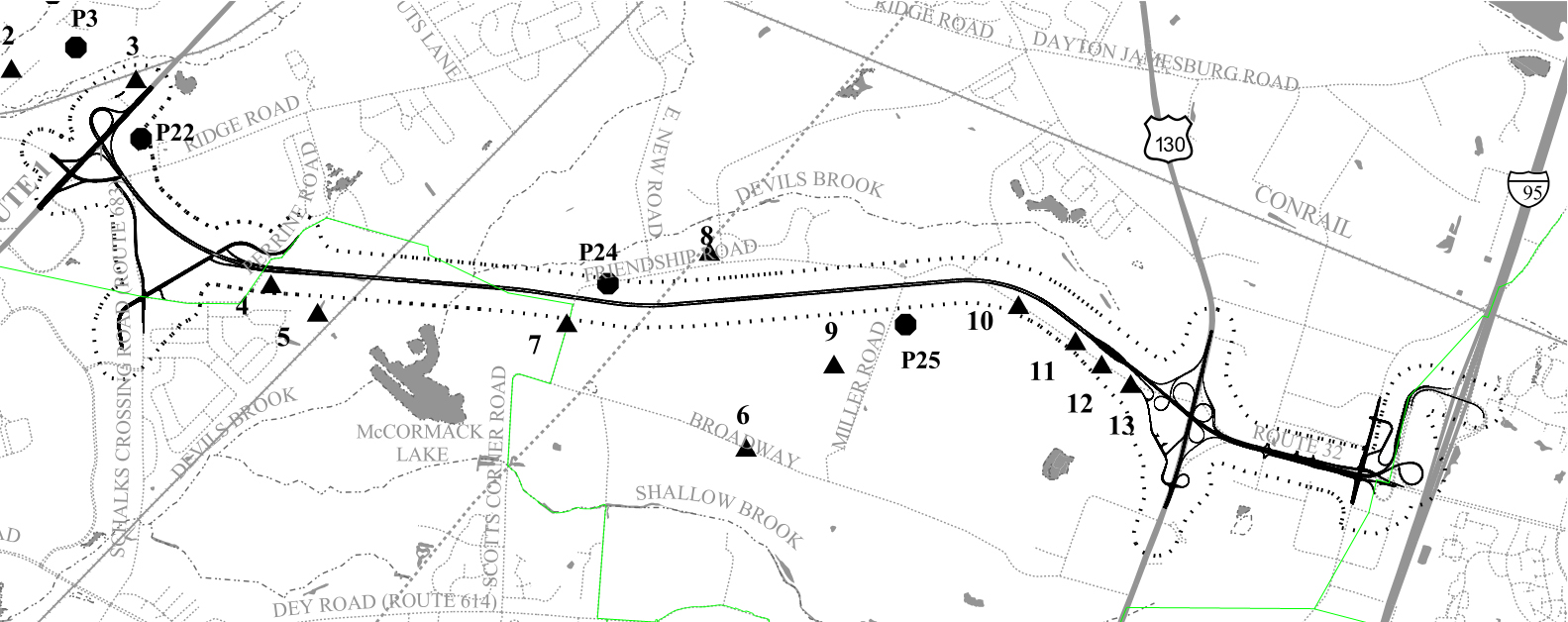
Route 92's proposed alignment and Route 32 is the easternmost portion

Route 32's alignment from US 130 to the turnpike was also designated to become an alignment of Route 92, a tolled extension of the New Jersey Turnpike. Route 32 and nearby Friendship Road were to be supplanted by Route 92, using exit 8A on the turnpike for the eastern terminus. However, after years of struggle to get the toll route built, the New Jersey Turnpike Authority canceled the Route 92 project on December 1, 2006.

== Future ==
Due to congestion from exit 8A on the turnpike, the turnpike authority is proposing a project to improve traffic congestion along Route 32 called the "Interchange 8A to Route 130 Connection". The project would start from US 130 in South Brunswick and end at interchange 8A in Monroe. Plans and dates have yet to be determined.

== Major intersections ==
The entire route is in Middlesex County.

Location	mi	km	Destinations	Notes
South Brunswick	0.00	0.00	US 130 – Hightstown, Princeton, New Brunswick	Western terminus of Route 32
South Brunswick	0.90	1.45	CR 535 (Cranbury–South River Road) – South River, Cranbury	
South Brunswick–Monroe Township line	1.07	1.72	I-95 Toll / N.J. Turnpike – New York City, Trenton	Exit 8A on I-95 / Turnpike
Monroe Township	1.18	1.90	CR 612 east – Jamesburg	Continuation east
1.000 mi = 1.609 km; 1.000 km = 0.621 mi: Tolled
