= Johnson Park (New Jersey) =

Park in New Jersey, United States

Coordinates: 40°30′31″N 74°27′05″W

Johnson Park is a 473-acre (191 ha) linear park that runs along the northern banks of the Raritan River in the towns of Piscataway and Highland Park, New Jersey. The park's wide range of facilities included a small zoo, which was closed in April 2022.

The park is maintained and operated by the Middlesex County Parks and Recreation Department.

Johnson Park includes walking trails, athletic fields, picnic areas, and the East Jersey Old Town Village, a reconstructed historical village featuring preserved 18th- and 19th-century structures.

Paths through the park help to connect the East Coast Greenway.

East Jersey Olde Towne Village is adjacent.
