= Interstate 95 in New Jersey =

Section of Interstate Highway in New Jersey

Interstate 95
- I-95 highlighted in red, the Western Spur highlighted in purple, the former I-95 alignment and canceled Somerset Freeway alignment highlighted in brown

Route information
- Maintained by NJTA and PANYNJ
- Length: 97.76 mi (157.33 km)
- Existed: 1959–present
- NHS: Entire route

Main section
- Length: 77.96 mi (125.46 km)
- South end: I-95 / Penna Turnpike at the Pennsylvania state line in Florence Township
- Major intersections: N.J. Turnpike in Mansfield Township; I-195 in Robbinsville Township; I-287 / Route 440 / CR 514 in Edison; G.S. Parkway in Woodbridge Township; I-278 / Route 439 in Elizabeth; I-78 / Newark Bay Extension in Newark; I-280 in Kearny; Route 495 / CR 681 in Secaucus; I-80 / CR 56 in Teaneck; US 1-9 / US 46 / US 9W / Route 4 in Fort Lee
- North end: I-95 / US 1-9 at the New York state line in Fort Lee

Western Spur
- Length: 11.03 mi (17.75 km)
- South end: I-95 Toll / N.J. Turnpike in Newark
- Major intersections: I-280 in Kearny; Route 3 / Route 120 in East Rutherford
- North end: I-95 / N.J. Turnpike in Ridgefield Park

Location
- Country: United States
- State: New Jersey
- Counties: Burlington, Mercer, Middlesex, Union, Essex, Hudson, Bergen

Highway system
- Interstate Highway System; Main; Auxiliary; Suffixed; Business; Future; New Jersey State Highway Routes; Interstate; US; State; Scenic Byways
| ← Route 94 | → Route 100 |
| ← I-676 | I-695 | → Route 700 |

Interstate 95 (I-95) is a major Interstate Highway that runs along the East Coast of the United States from Miami, Florida, north to the Canada–United States border at Houlton, Maine. In New Jersey, it runs along much of the mainline of the New Jersey Turnpike (exit 6 to exit 18), as well as the Pearl Harbor Memorial Turnpike Extension (formerly and still commonly known as the Pennsylvania Turnpike Connector; from exit 6 to the Delaware River–Turnpike Toll Bridge), and the New Jersey Turnpike's I-95 Extension (from exit 18) to the George Washington Bridge approach for a total of 77.96 miles (125.46 km). Located in the northeastern part of the state near New York City, the 11.03-mile (17.75 km) Western Spur of the New Jersey Turnpike, considered to be Route 95W by the New Jersey Department of Transportation (NJDOT), is also part of I-95.

I-95 enters the state from the Pennsylvania Turnpike on the Delaware River–Turnpike Toll Bridge, following the length of the Pearl Harbor Memorial Turnpike Extension to exit 6 on the New Jersey Turnpike mainline, continuing north along the remainder of the latter road to U.S. Route 46 (US 46), where it continues as the turnpike's I-95 extension to the George Washington Bridge approach, before crossing the bridge and entering New York. All of I-95 in New Jersey is maintained by the New Jersey Turnpike Authority (NJTA) except for the George Washington Bridge and its approach, which are maintained by the Port Authority of New York and New Jersey (PANYNJ).

Until 2018, I-95 had not formed a continuous route within New Jersey. From Pennsylvania, I-95 entered New Jersey on the Scudder Falls Bridge and ended at US 1 in Lawrence Township, where the freeway then turned south as I-295. From New York, I-95 continued from the George Washington Bridge southward along the New Jersey Turnpike and west along the Pearl Harbor Memorial Turnpike Extension to end at the Pennsylvania state line, where I-276 continued into that state along the Pennsylvania Turnpike. This discontinuity was caused by the 1983 cancellation of the Somerset Freeway, which would have connected the former Trenton segment of I-95 in Hopewell Township northeast to I-287 in Piscataway. From here, I-95 would have followed present-day I-287 to exit 10 on the New Jersey Turnpike in Edison.

In order to fill the gap, the Pennsylvania Turnpike/Interstate 95 Interchange Project saw the construction of an interchange between the Pennsylvania Turnpike and I-95 in Bristol Township, Pennsylvania, with I-95 being rerouted to use the Pennsylvania Turnpike to the Delaware River–Turnpike Toll Bridge. By March 2018, the former I-95 around the north side of Trenton to just across the Scudder Falls Bridge in Pennsylvania became an extension of I-295, with I-295 extended to the interchange by July of the same year. On September 22, 2018, the ramps connecting I-95 and the Pennsylvania Turnpike opened, allowing a direct freeway route from Philadelphia to New York City and finally completing I-95 as a whole.

== Route description ==
=== Pearl Harbor Memorial Turnpike Extension ===
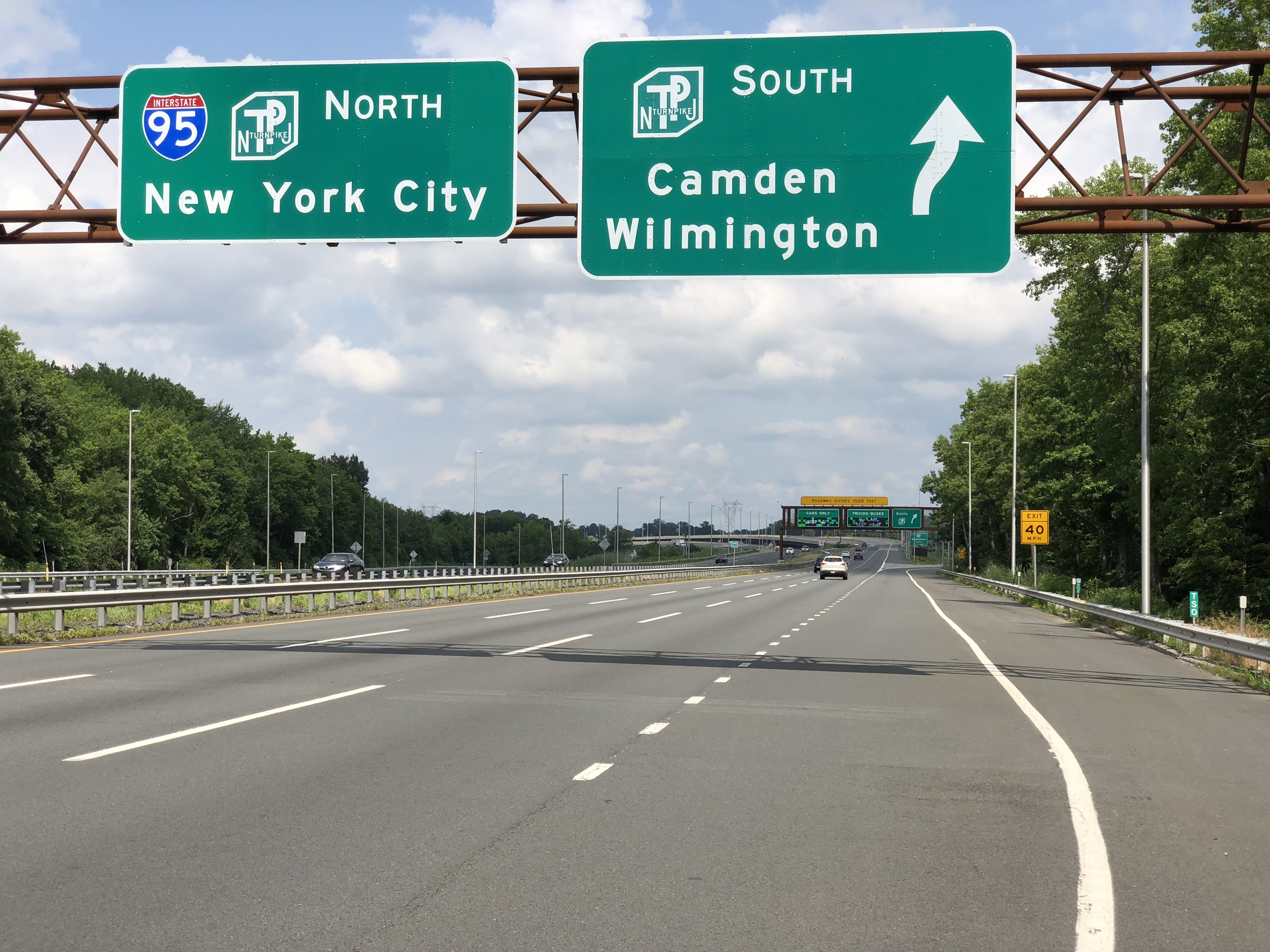
Pearl Harbor Memorial Turnpike Extension of the New Jersey Turnpike (I-95) at the interchange with the New Jersey Turnpike mainline in Mansfield Township

I-95 enters New Jersey at the Delaware River–Turnpike Toll Bridge over the Delaware River in Burlington Township, Burlington County, where the road continues west (south) into Pennsylvania as the Pennsylvania Turnpike. From the river, I-95 follows the six-lane Pearl Harbor Memorial Turnpike Extension of the New Jersey Turnpike east into New Jersey. Continuing east through a mix of fields and warehouses into Florence Township, the highway passes over NJ Transit's River Line and has an interchange serving US 130. This interchange has a toll plaza on the ramp to southbound I-95. After this interchange, the road comes to a toll barrier that marks the beginning of the turnpike ticket system northbound and the end of the ticket system southbound. The Pearl Harbor Memorial Turnpike Extension crosses into Mansfield Township and passes under I-295 before merging into the mainline of the New Jersey Turnpike at exit 6.

=== New Jersey Turnpike mainline ===
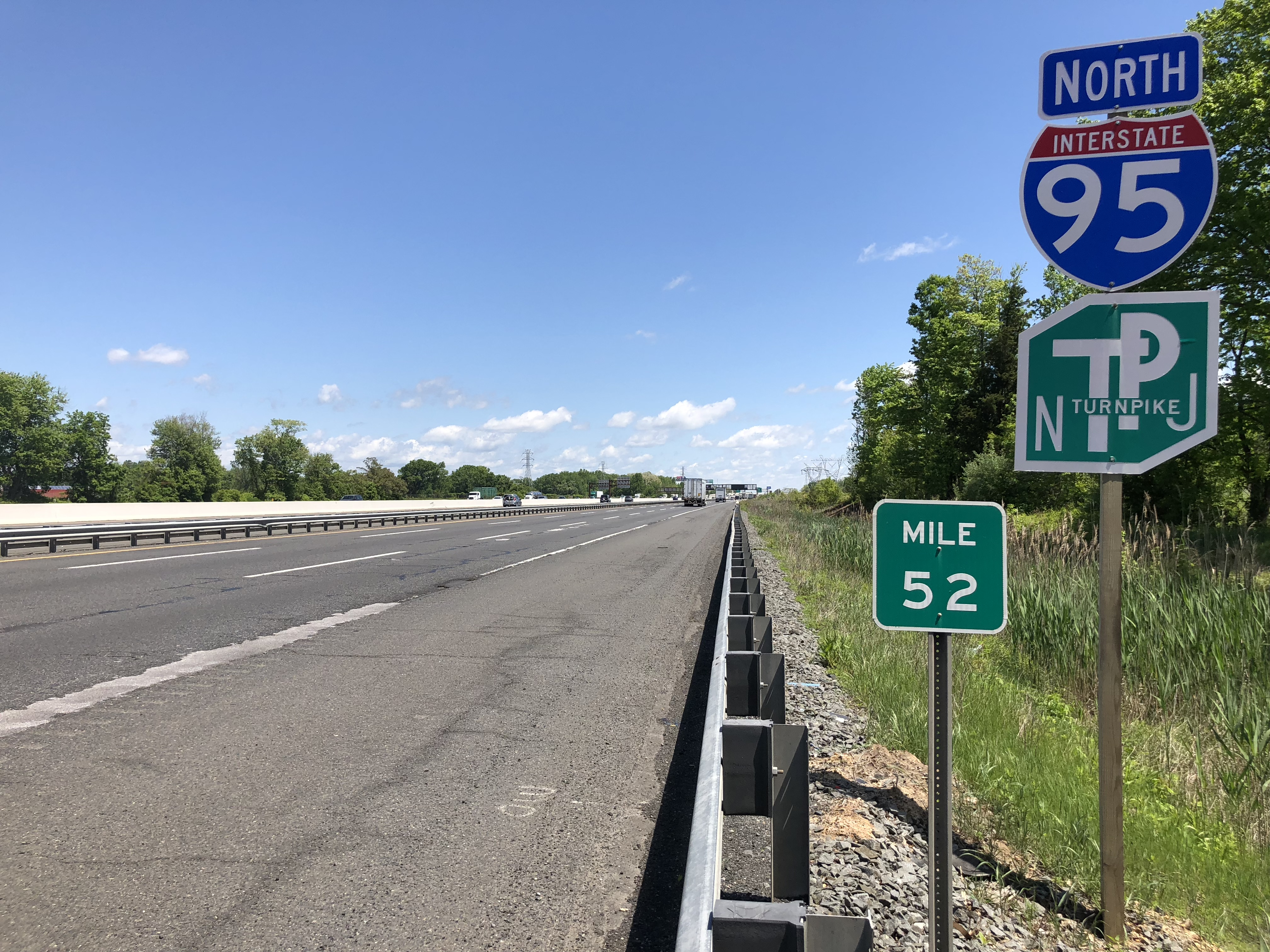
View north along the New Jersey Turnpike in Mansfield Township, Burlington County

==== Mansfield Townships to Newark ====
At this point, I-95 enters the turnpike mainline, with 12 lanes featuring six inner lanes exclusively for cars separated from six outer lanes for cars, trucks, and buses. It soon reaches an exit for US 206 in Bordentown Township. Continuing north through mostly rural areas, the turnpike heads into Mercer County and comes to the I-195 interchange in Robbinsville Township. In East Windsor, the turrnpike reaches the exit for Route 133/Route 33, located to the east of Hightstown. Heading into Middlesex County, development near the highway increases. At this point, an interchange serves Route 32 in Monroe Township. Continuing north into more dense suburban development, I-95 intersects Route 18 in East Brunswick near the city of New Brunswick. After crossing the Raritan River, the New Jersey Turnpike heads northeast to the I-287/Route 440 junction in Edison. In Woodbridge Township, the turnpike comes to a large interchange accessing both the Garden State Parkway and US 9. From this point, the turnpike enters areas of heavy industry and comes to the County Route 602 (CR 602) exit in Carteret. In Union County, I-95 comes to the I-278 exit on the border of Linden and Elizabeth at the western approach to the Goethals Bridge. In the northern part of Elizabeth, the turnpike comes to Route 81 which provides access to Newark Liberty International Airport, before running along the east side of the airport. Northeast of the airport, the turnpike intersects I-78 in Newark, Essex County. At US 1/9 Truck, the turnpike splits into the Western and Eastern Spurs and enters the New Jersey Meadowlands.

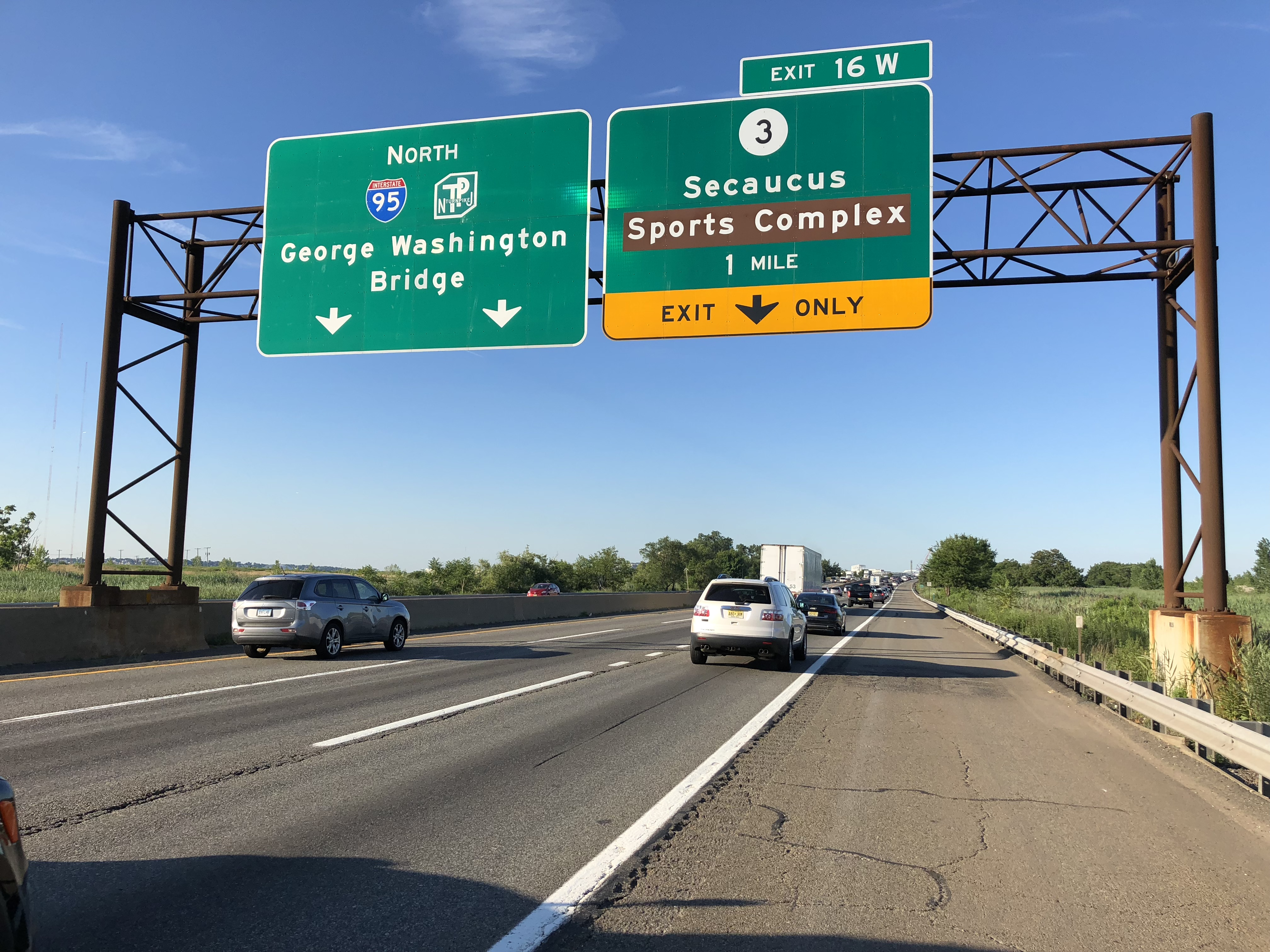
View north along what the NJDOT refers to as Route 95W, the Western Spur (or "Western Alignment" as the NJDOT refers to it as) of the New Jersey Turnpike, one mile (1.6 km) south of exit 16W

==== Kearny to Ridgefield Park ====
After both the Western and Eastern Spurs cross the Passaic River on the Harry Laderman and Chaplain Washington Bridges, the mainline of I-95 officially follows the Eastern Spur, which has exits to I-280 in Kearny, Hudson County, and the Secaucus Junction train station and Route 3/Route 495 in Secaucus, where it reaches the northern end of the ticket system. The Western Spur is also signed as I-95 but is officially known as Route 95W. This road has interchanges serving I-280 in Kearny and Route 3 in East Rutherford, Bergen County, the latter connecting to Route 120 and CR 503, serving the Meadowlands Sports Complex. The ticket system on the Western Spur ends at a barrier in Carlstadt, following which the road comes to an E-ZPass-only interchange for the Meadowlands Sports Complex and the American Dream Meadowlands shopping and entertainment complex. In Ridgefield, the Eastern and Western Spurs merge again, with the road continuing north into Ridgefield Park.

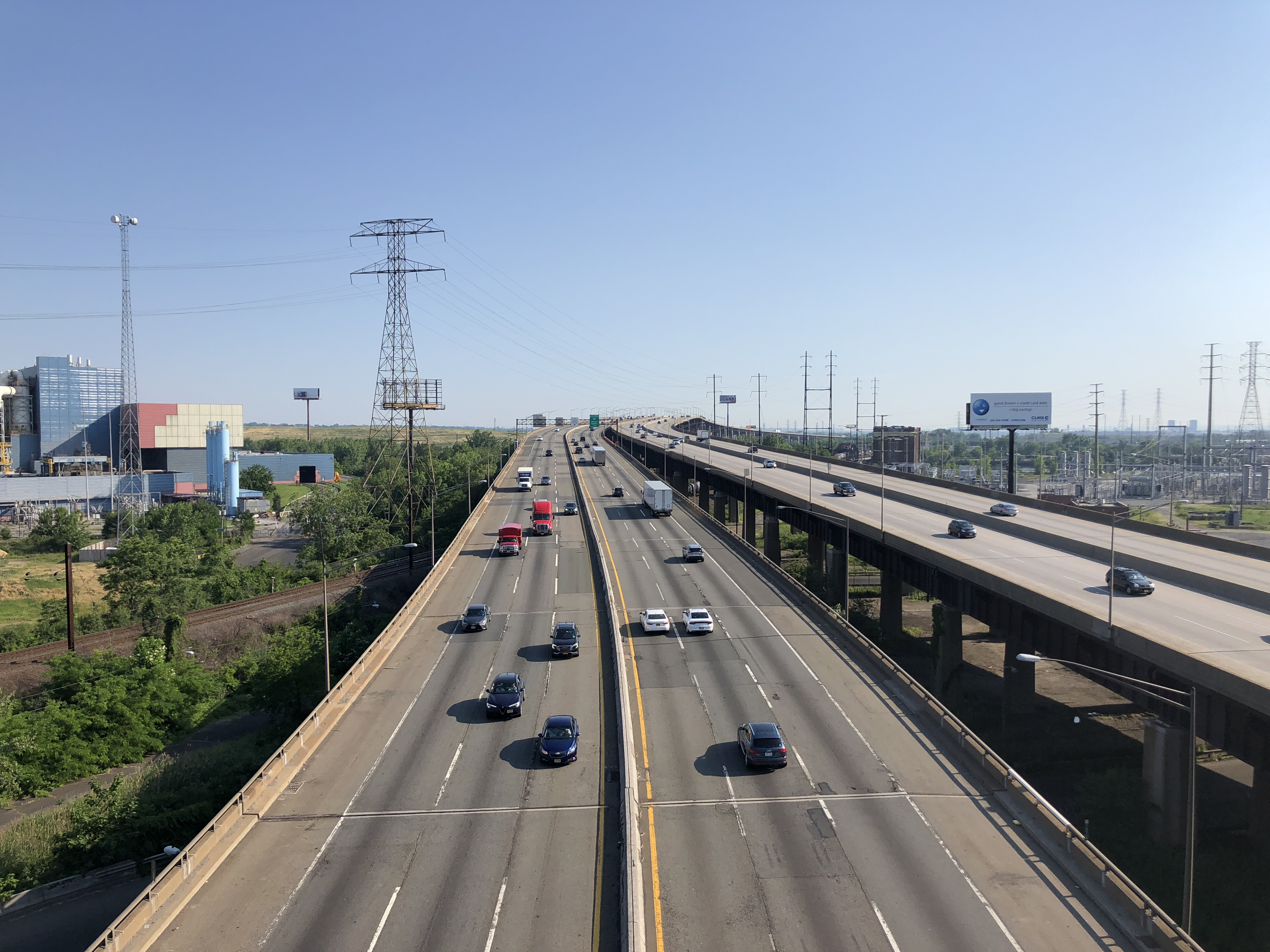
Northbound view along the western and eastern spurs of the turnpike as they rise to cross the Passaic River, as seen from the Pulaski Skyway

=== George Washington Bridge approach ===
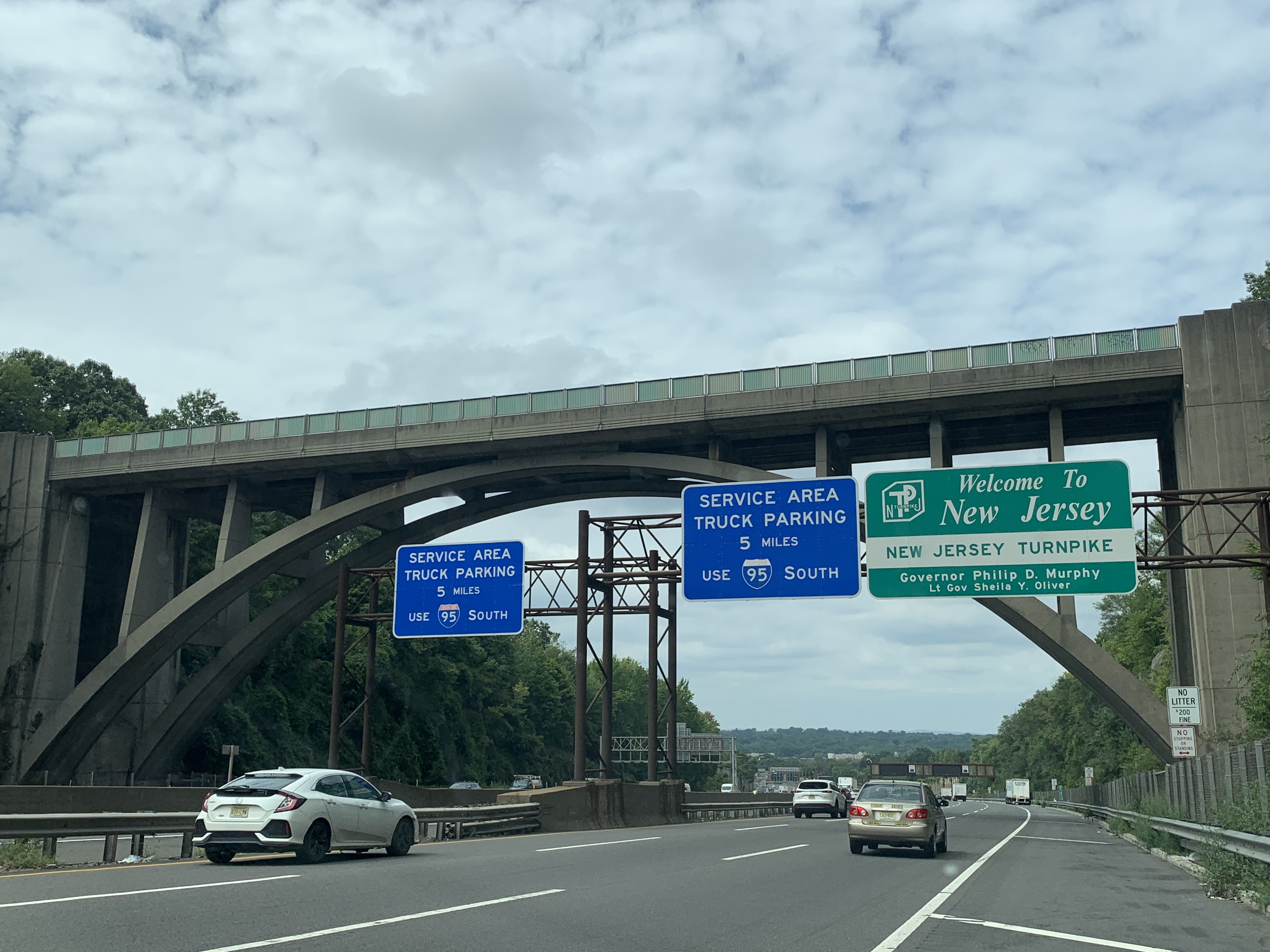
Sign welcoming drivers to the New Jersey Turnpike under the Edgewood Road Bridge

In Ridgefield Park, I-95 continues north as a toll-free highway cosigned with the New Jersey Turnpike and maintained by the NJTA. This section of the Turnpike from this point to the George Washington Bridge approach is designated the “I-95 Extension” of the Turnpike. It has a large interchange serving US 46, part of which was the original northern terminus of the turnpike before it was extended. From this point, it has the appearance of a local–express lane configuration carrying three local lanes and two express lanes (3–2–2–3) in each direction, but the northbound "express" lane only leads exclusively to I-80 west while the northbound local lanes continues as the main trunk of I-95. (On the southbound side, the "express" lanes function as the main trunk of I-95 south while the southbound local lanes lead exclusively from I-80 east.) The road runs near suburban neighborhoods before entering Teaneck and intersecting with the eastern terminus of I-80. From here, I-95 turns northeast and splits into an actual local–express lane configuration with a 3–2–2–3 lane count, soon interchanging with CR 56 as it passes northwest of Overpeck County Park. The highway turns east as it skirts the border between Englewood to the north and Leonia to the south. After crossing CSX Transportation's Northern Branch, the highway enters inhabited areas as it passes over Route 93/CR 501 (Grand Avenue) and has a northbound exit and southbound entrance serving Broad Avenue. I-95 forms a hairpin turn around Leonia to the southeast into Fort Lee and heads due south to Route 4. I-95 runs under the Edgewood Road Bridge here, an overpass that runs high above the highway, and is considered an iconic view for drivers entering New Jersey from the George Washington Bridge. After the overpass, I-95 runs in between the travel lanes of Route 4 as the freeway comes to a large interchange with southbound exits and northbound entrances for Route 4, US 1/9, US 46, and a full interchange with the southern terminus of US 9W (Fletcher Avenue). At this location, the New Jersey Turnpike officially ends and the jurisdiction changes from the NJTA to the PANYNJ.

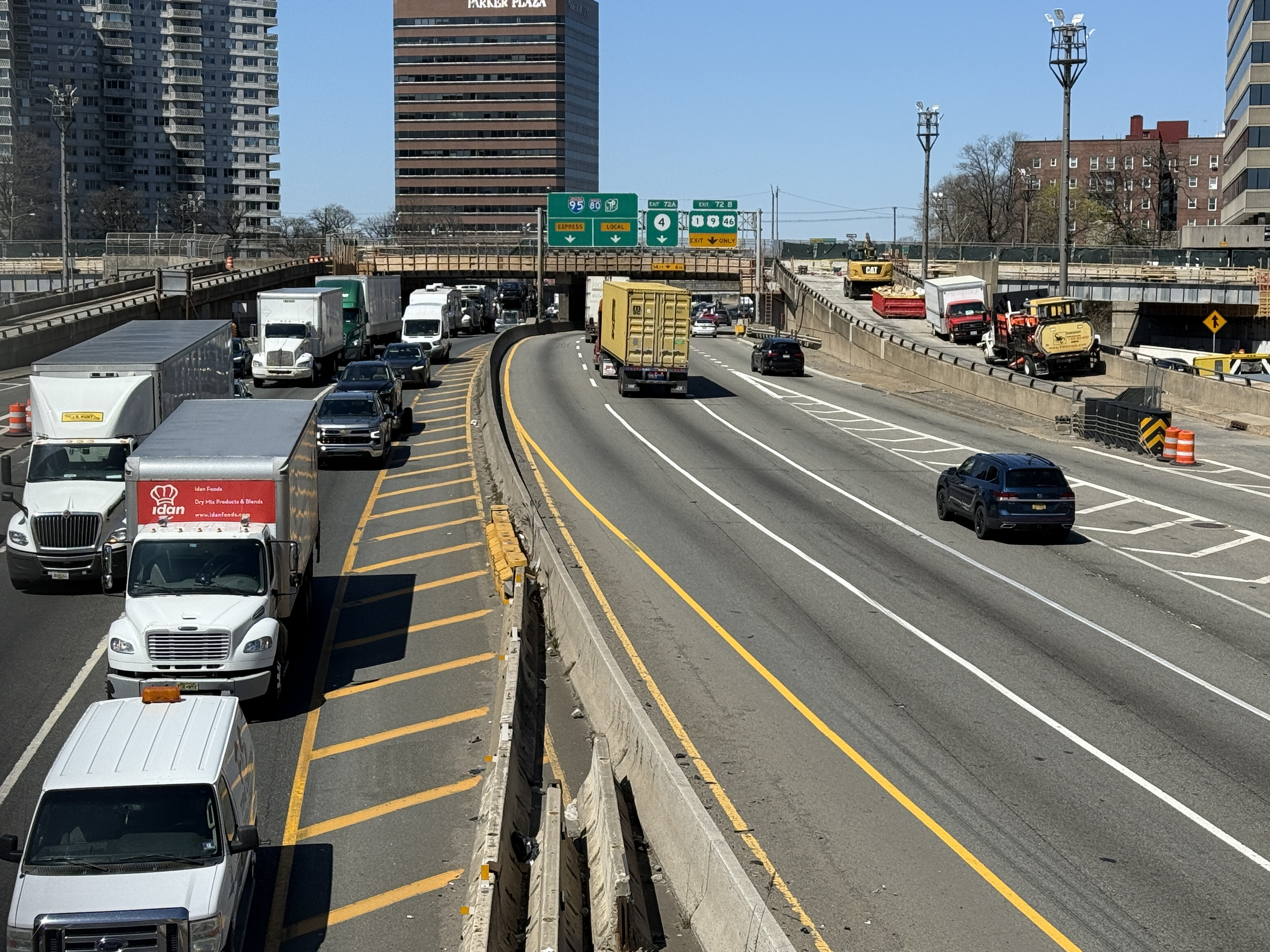
I-95 southbound approaching split with US 1/9/US 46 past the George Washington Bridge in Fort Lee

Here, US 1/9/US 46 all join I-95 and the road continues southeast containing four local lanes and four express lanes in each direction, passing numerous highrise buildings through Fort Lee. The road has a southbound exit and northbound entrance to Route 67 from the express lanes before coming to a southbound exit and northbound entrance for the Palisades Interstate Parkway, also from the express lanes. After the Palisades Interstate Parkway, the road crosses high over Henry Hudson Drive, then the Hudson River on the George Washington Bridge, which has eight lanes total on the upper deck (the express lanes) and six lanes total on the lower deck (the local lanes). US 46 terminates at the state border between New Jersey and New York, while I-95 and US 1-9 continue into upper Manhattan.

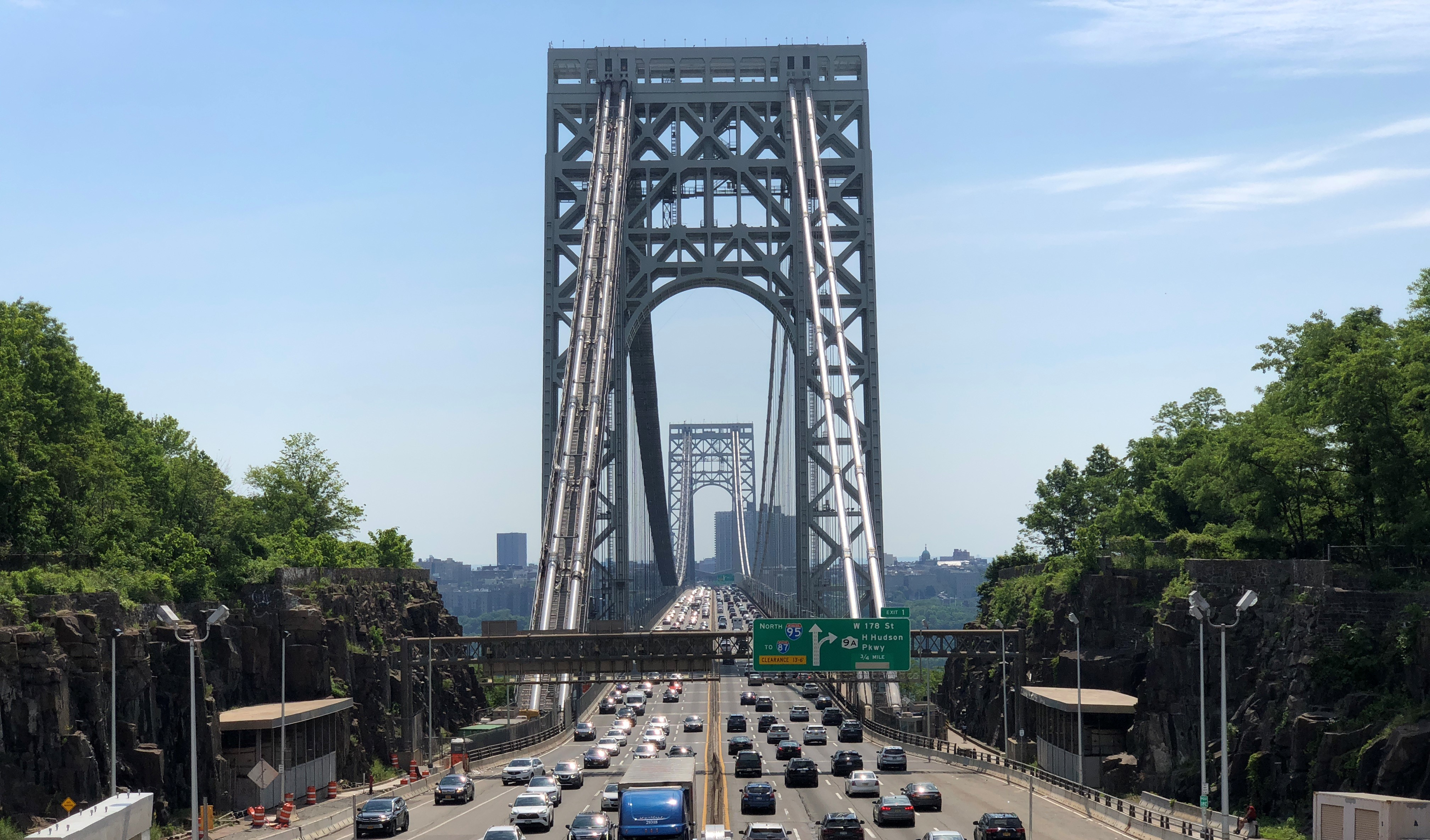
I-95 northbound just before leaving New Jersey via the George Washington Bridge

== History ==
What became I-95 and I-295 around the northern part of Trenton was first legislated as part of Route 39, a route that was to run from the Yardley–Wilburtha Bridge around Trenton south to Hammonton. Seven northeastern states from Virginia to Massachusetts including New Jersey proposed a limited-access highway in 1942 called the 7-State Highway; this was never built. The New Jersey State Highway Department proposed Federal Aid Interstate Route 103 in 1956, and it was approved in 1957 by the Bureau of Public Roads (BPR). At that time, the New Jersey Turnpike (mainline and Pennsylvania Extension) and George Washington Bridge had been completed; US 46 connected the north end of the New Jersey Turnpike to the bridge. The BPR approved the planned alignment north of the Trenton area, which would have run generally northeast to exit 9 (Route 18) of the New Jersey Turnpike. From there, it would use the New Jersey Turnpike to its north end (exit 18, US 46) and a proposed freeway north to the planned I-80, then head east to the George Washington Bridge. The road was designated as part of I-95 in 1958.

In the 1960s, the I-95 approach to the George Washington Bridge was completed, connecting to I-80 in Teaneck. The portion of I-95 between the north end of the New Jersey Turnpike and I-80 opened in 1971. Originally maintained by NJDOT, ownership of I-95 north of US 46 in Ridgefield Park was transferred to the NJTA in 1992 in order to balance the state budget, thus incorporating it as an extension of the turnpike.

=== Routing through Central New Jersey: Somerset Freeway ===
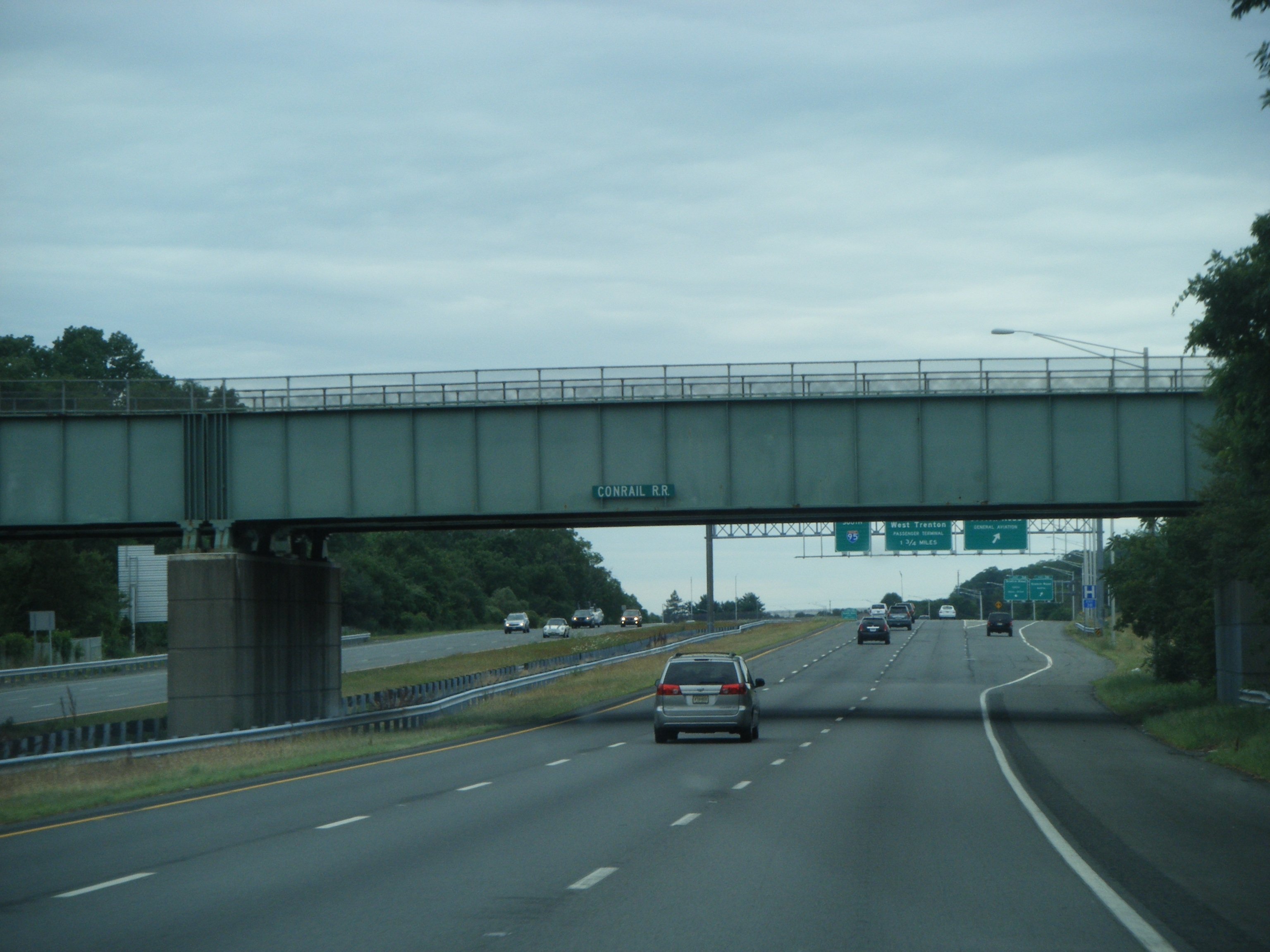
Former I-95 southbound (now I-295 northbound) in Ewing Township

The location of I-95 in the Trenton area had not been finalized when the route was first designated. The BPR preferred using the Trenton Freeway (US 1 and Route 174), which was completed to Whitehead Road, but New Jersey and Pennsylvania proposed using the Scudder Falls Bridge and its approach (Route 129), opened in 1961 to Scotch Road, due in part to low design standards of the Trenton Freeway. As a result, I-95 was routed to use the Scudder Falls Bridge approach. The approach to the Scudder Falls Bridge was extended in 1974, northeast to the planned interchange with the new I-95 freeway, and then east to US 1 as I-295.

From the I-95/I-295 loop around Trenton, the routing was to divert from the loop between the Route 31 and Federal City Road exits in Hopewell Township. Then, the highway was to intersect CR 546 and US 206 before coming to I-287 in Piscataway. There was also meant to be a small connector roughly one mile (1.6 km) in length connecting I-95 with I-287 from the north and designated Interstate 695 (I-695). (The I-695 designation, along with I-95's alignment in Piscataway, was dropped when I-695's own alignment became the preferred routing for I-95 to a full three-way interchange with I-287 in Franklin Township.)

At this point, the freeway would have continued northeastward through the western parts of Elizabeth and Newark, then terminate at the northern terminus of the New Jersey Turnpike at Ridgefield, but it was instead decided to route I-95 along the New Jersey Turnpike through North Jersey.

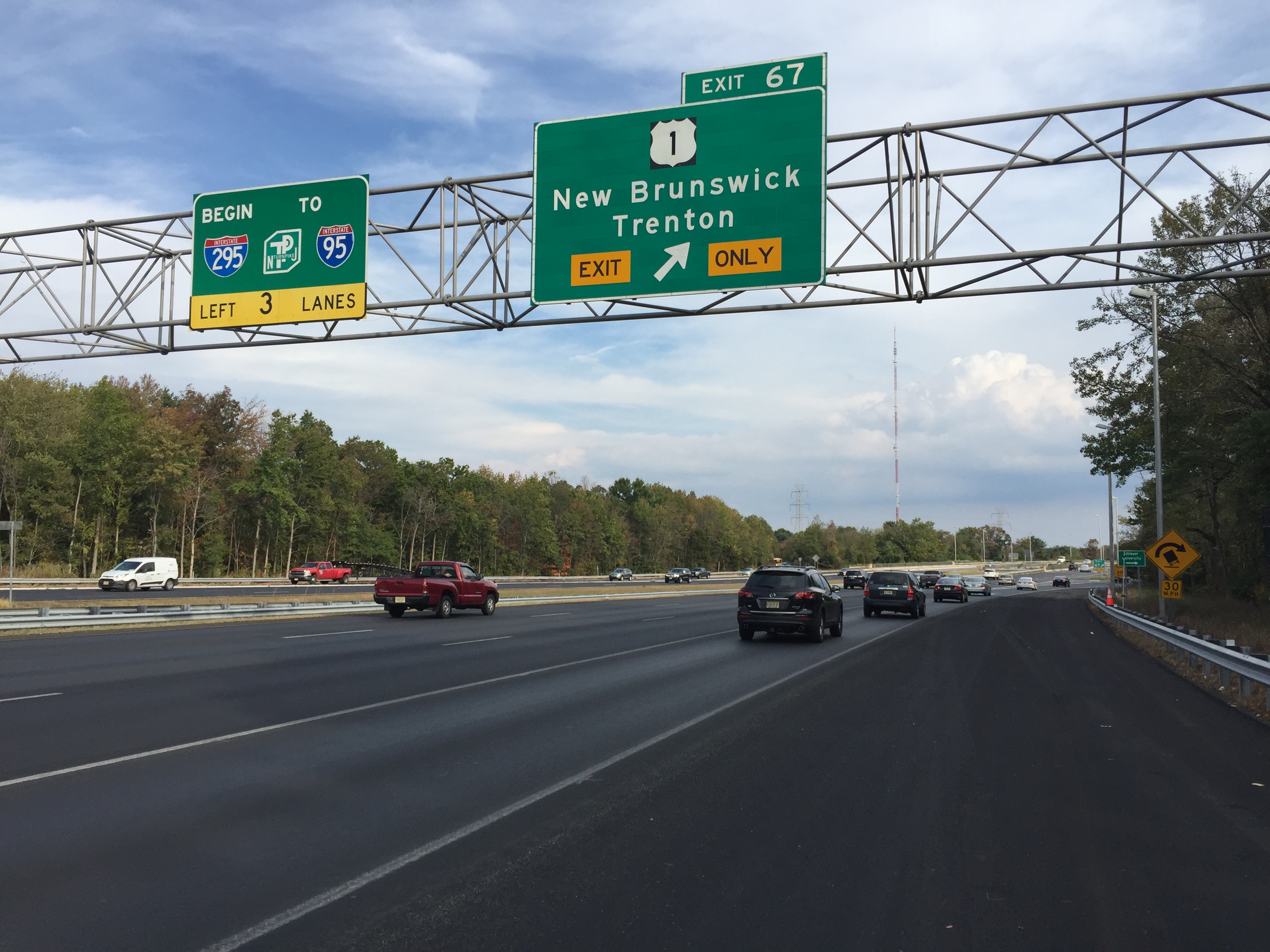
Before 2018, I-95 northbound abruptly became I-295 southbound in Lawrence Township. Signage directed drivers to continue south on I-295 and east on I-195 to reach I-95 northbound (New Jersey Turnpike).

The truncated route, known as the Somerset Freeway, was intended to terminate in Piscataway at I-287, and I-95 would have continued east along present day I-287 until it intersected with the New Jersey Turnpike at exit 10 in Edison Township. The I-287 designation would probably have been truncated to begin at the junction with the Somerset Freeway. Both the Somerset Freeway and I-695 were projected to cost $55 million (equivalent to $405 million in 2025) in 1967, with the cost increasing to $375 million (equivalent to $1.34 billion in 2025) in 1979. At this point, residents in Hopewell Township, Princeton, and Montgomery Township raised opposition out of the fear the Somerset Freeway would bring unwanted development to area farmland. The NJTA joined environmental and community groups in opposing the Somerset Freeway, as it would provide a toll-free alternative to the New Jersey Turnpike. Due to this opposition, New Jersey Governor Brendan Byrne announced in 1980 that the state would not build the Somerset Freeway. The US Congress officially canceled the Somerset Freeway by way of the Surface Transportation Assistance Act of 1982, rerouting I-95 south on the New Jersey Turnpike to exit 6, and onto its Pennsylvania Extension to end at the state line on the Delaware River–Turnpike Toll Bridge, pending the construction of an interchange where the Pennsylvania Turnpike crossed existing I-95 in Pennsylvania. As a result of this cancelation, the federal government gave New Jersey $246 million (equivalent to $693 million in 2025) for road projects in the area where the Somerset Freeway was to be built.

In 1995, increasing truck traffic on US 206 and Route 31 motivated officials in Mercer County to have the state reconsider building the Somerset Freeway as a way to alleviate traffic on area roads. This option was ruled out due to a $700-million (equivalent to $1.35 billion in 2025) pricetag. Also around this time, I-95 was extended east along I-295 between the site of the Somerset Freeway interchange and US 1 in Lawrence Township.

=== Filling the I-95 gap ===
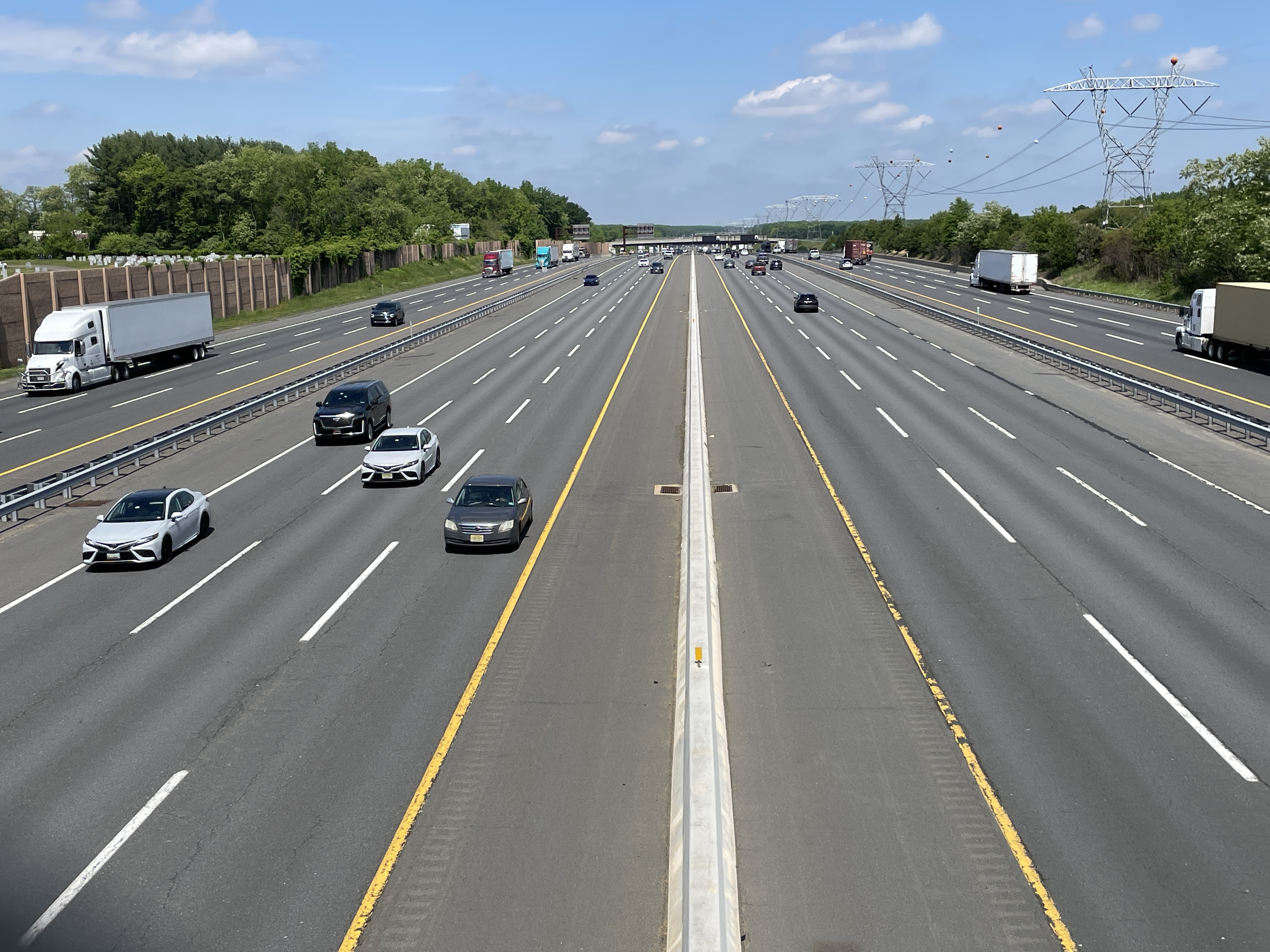
I-95 northbound on the New Jersey Turnpike in Robbinsville Township

Due to the cancellation of the Somerset Freeway in 1983, a gap existed on I-95 within New Jersey for roughly 35 years. Northbound I-95 ended at US 1 in Lawrence Township where the road became I-295. Meanwhile, southbound I-95 entered New Jersey on the George Washington Bridge and continued along its present-day routing down the New Jersey Turnpike and across the Delaware River–Turnpike Toll Bridge, where the road became I-276 at the Pennsylvania state line. Until this gap was filled, traffic from Pennsylvania was directed along I-95 northbound (to the Scudder Falls Bridge), then on its continuation as I-295 southbound until its interchange at I-195, which leads eastward to meet the New Jersey Turnpike at exit 7A.

In order to close the gap, an interchange was constructed between I-95 and the Pennsylvania Turnpike in Bristol Township, Pennsylvania. The interchange was first planned in the 1980s after the Somerset Freeway's cancelation. As a result of this project, I-95 was rerouted from its former alignment in Pennsylvania and New Jersey to the easternmost part of the Pennsylvania Turnpike, replacing I-276 between the interchange and the Delaware River. In addition, I-295 was extended from its former northern terminus at US 1 westward (highway north) to the Scudder Falls Bridge and southward (highway west) through Pennsylvania to the new interchange. I-295 was initially chosen to be extended in this manner, but, in 2005, the plans were modified to extend I-195 from its current western terminus at I-295 and then north along I-295 and I-95 (bypassing Trenton) to the Scudder Falls Bridge and the new interchange. On May 20, 2015, the plans were reverted to extend I-295 to the interchange. The multiphased construction began in late 2010, and the approved design called for Stage 1 to tentatively end in 2020. Groundbreaking for the interchange took place on July 30, 2013, with Pennsylvania Governor Tom Corbett in attendance. In March 2018, I-95 was renumbered to I-295 between US 1 in Lawrence Township, New Jersey, and Taylorsville Road in Lower Makefield Township, Pennsylvania. The redesignation that officially bridged the I-95 gap was made official on September 22, 2018, before the completion of Stage 1.

== Exit list ==
| County | Location | mi | km | Exit | Destinations | Notes |
|---|---|---|---|---|---|---|
| Delaware River | | 0.00 | 0.00 | | I-95 south / Penna Turnpike west to I-276 Toll west – Philadelphia Pearl Harbor Extension begins | Continuation into Pennsylvania; western terminus of Pearl Harbor Extension |
| Delaware River | | 0.00 | 0.00 | Delaware River–Turnpike Toll Bridge (southbound toll in Pennsylvania) | | |
| Burlington | Florence Township | 2.61 | 4.20 | 6A | US 130 – Florence, Burlington | Tolled southbound entrance; exit number not signed; last northbound exit before toll |
| Burlington | Florence Township | 3.17 | 5.10 | Exit 6 Toll Plaza (southern end of ticket system) | | |
| Burlington | Mansfield Township | 5.33– 6.50 | 8.58– 10.46 | 6 | N.J. Turnpike south – Camden, Wilmington Pearl Harbor Extension ends | Southern end of N.J. Turnpike concurrency; eastern terminus of Pearl Harbor Extension; exit number not signed southbound |
| Burlington | Mansfield Township | 6.50 | 10.46 | Southern end of dual carriageways (inner roadway for cars only and outer roadway for cars, trucks, and buses) | | |
| Burlington | Bordentown Township | 7.95 | 12.79 | 7 | US 206 – Bordentown, Trenton | |
| Mercer | Robbinsville Township | 15.15 | 24.38 | 7A | I-195 – Trenton, Shore Points | Exit 6 on I-195 |
| Mercer | East Windsor | 22.12 | 35.60 | 8 | Route 133 west to Route 33 – Hightstown, Freehold | Eastern terminus of Route 133 |
| Middlesex | Monroe Township–South Brunswick line | 28.51 | 45.88 | 8A | Route 32 / CR 535 to US 130 – Jamesburg, Cranbury | CR 535 not signed |
| Middlesex | East Brunswick | 38.07 | 61.27 | 9 | Route 18 (CR 527) to US 1 – New Brunswick | |
| Middlesex | Raritan River | 38.89 | 62.59 | Basilone Bridge | | |
| Middlesex | Edison | 42.73 | 68.77 | 10 | I-287 north / Route 440 north / CR 514 – Metuchen, Perth Amboy | Southern termini of I-287 and Route 440; CR 514 not signed |
| Middlesex | Woodbridge Township | 45.65 | 73.47 | 11 | G.S. Parkway to US 9 – Woodbridge, Shore Points | Exit 129 on G.S. Parkway |
| Middlesex | Carteret | 50.53 | 81.32 | 12 | Carteret, Rahway | Access via CR 602 |
| Union | Elizabeth | 53.75 | 86.50 | 13 | I-278 – Elizabeth, Staten Island | Access to Elizabeth via Route 439; exit 3A on I-278 |
| Union | Elizabeth | 56.33 | 90.65 | 13A | Newark Airport, Elizabeth Seaport | Access via Route 81 |
| Essex | Newark | 59.19 | 95.26 | 14-14C | I-78 / Newark Bay Extension east to US 1-9 – Newark Airport, Bayonne, Jersey City, Holland Tunnel | Signed as exits 14 (I-78 west) and 14A-C (I-78 east); western terminus of Newark Bay Extension; exit 14 on I-78 |
| Essex | Newark | 61.10– 61.30 | 98.33– 98.65 | – | I-95 Toll north / N.J. Turnpike north (Route 95W north) to I-280 west / Route 3 – Meadowlands Sports Complex, George Washington Bridge | Southern terminus of Route 95W (Western Spur); northbound exit and southbound entrance |
| Essex | Newark | 61.52 | 99.01 | 15E | US 1-9 south / US 1-9 Truck north – Newark, Jersey City | Signed for US 1-9 southbound, US 1-9 Truck northbound; southern terminus of US 1-9 Truck |
| Hudson | Kearny | 63.18 | 101.68 | 15W | I-280 west – Newark, Kearny | Southbound exit and northbound entrance; eastern terminus of I-280 |
| Hudson | Secaucus | 65.30 | 105.09 | 15X | Secaucus | Access via Seaview Drive |
| Hudson | Secaucus | 67.23 | 108.20 | 16E | Route 495 east – Lincoln Tunnel | Northbound exit and southbound entrance; western terminus of Route 495; former I-495 |
| Hudson | Secaucus | 67.23 | 108.20 | Exit 18E Toll Plaza (northern end of ticket system) | | |
| Hudson | Secaucus | 67.64 | 108.86 | 17 | Route 495 east to Route 3 – Lincoln Tunnel, Secaucus | Tolled southbound exit; no southbound entrance; no northbound access to Route 495; access to Route 3 via CR 681; exit no. not signed northbound |
| Bergen | Ridgefield | 70.98 | 114.23 | – | Vince Lombardi Service Area | |
| Bergen | Ridgefield | | | – | To I-80 west – Paterson | Northbound left exit and southbound entrance |
| Bergen | Ridgefield | 71.33 | 114.79 | – | I-95 Toll south / N.J. Turnpike south (Route 95W south) to Route 3 | Northern terminus of Route 95W (Western Spur); southbound exit and northbound entrance |
| Bergen | Ridgefield Park | 72.31 | 116.37 | 68 | US 46 / CR 39 – The Ridgefields, Palisades Park | No northbound entrance; no northbound access to CR 39; CR 39 not signed; exit number not signed northbound; last southbound exit before toll |
| Bergen | Ridgefield Park | 72.48 | 116.65 | 68 | Challenger Road | Northbound exit and entrance |
| Bergen | Ridgefield Park–Teaneck line | 73.07 | 117.59 | – | I-95 north (Express Lanes) – George Washington Bridge Upper Level | Southern terminus of Express lanes; left exit and entrance; all trucks to New York |
| Bergen | Teaneck | 73.59– 74.10 | 118.43– 119.25 | 69 | I-80 west to G.S. Parkway – Hackensack, Paterson | Southbound exit and northbound entrance; eastern terminus and exit 68B on I-80 |
| Bergen | Teaneck | 73.59– 74.10 | 118.43– 119.25 | 70 | Leonia, Teaneck | Via local lanes only; signed as exits 70A (Leonia) and 70B (Teaneck) northbound; access via CR 56 |
| Bergen | Englewood | 75.58 | 121.63 | 71 | Englewood | Via local lanes only; northbound exit and southbound entrance; access via Broad Avenue |
| Bergen | Fort Lee | | | – | I-95 north (Express Lanes) – George Washington Bridge Upper Level | Northbound exit only; all trucks to New York |
| Bergen | Fort Lee | | | 72 | US 9W north to Palisades Parkway north – Fort Lee | Northbound exit and southbound entrance; southern terminus of US 9W |
| Bergen | Fort Lee | | | – | I-95 south / N.J. Turnpike south to I-80 west / G.S. Parkway – Paterson | Southern terminus of Upper Level lanes, northern terminus of southbound Express Lanes; southbound exit only |
| Bergen | Fort Lee | 76.2– 76.53 | 122.6– 123.16 | 72A | Route 4 west – Paramus | Southbound exit and northbound entrance; eastern terminus of Route 4 |
| Bergen | Fort Lee | 76.62– 76.66 | 123.31– 123.37 | 72B | US 1-9 south / US 46 west – Palisades Park N.J. Turnpike ends | Southbound exit and northbound entrance; southern end of US 1-9/US 46 concurrency; northern terminus of N.J. Turnpike |
| Bergen | Fort Lee | 76.66 | 123.37 | South end of PANYNJ jurisdiction | | |
| Bergen | Fort Lee | 76.66 | 123.37 | 73-74 | US 9W north to Route 67 / Palisades Parkway north – Fort Lee | Southbound exit and northbound entrance; southern terminus of US 9W |
| Bergen | Fort Lee | 77.18 | 124.21 | 73 | Route 67 (Lemoine Avenue) – Fort Lee | Northbound exit only; last northbound exit before toll |
| Bergen | Fort Lee | 77.18 | 124.21 | – | US 9 north to Upper Level | Northern end of US 9 concurrency; northbound exit only; northern terminus of Express Lanes, southern terminus of northbound Upper Level lanes; all trucks must exit |
| Hudson River | | 77.96 | 125.46 | George Washington Bridge (northbound toll; Pay-by-Plate or E-ZPass) | | |
| Hudson River | | 77.96 | 125.46 | | I-95 north / US 1-9 north to I-87 – New England, Long Island US 46 ends | Continuation into New York at the river's center; eastern terminus of US 46 |
1.000 mi = 1.609 km; 1.000 km = 0.621 mi: Concurrency terminus; Incomplete access; Tolled

=== Western Spur ===
| County | Location | mi | km | Exit | Destinations | Notes |
|---|---|---|---|---|---|---|
| Essex | Newark | 0.000 | 0.000 | | I-95 Toll south / N.J. Turnpike south – Trenton | Southern terminus of the Western Spur (Route 95W) |
| Essex | Newark | 0.70 | 1.13 | 14-14C | To I-78 / Newark Bay Extension east / US 1-9 – Newark Airport, Bayonne, Jersey City, Holland Tunnel | Southbound exit and northbound entrance; signed as exits 14 (I-78 west) and 14A-C (I-78 east) |
| Essex | Newark | 1.15 | 1.85 | 15E | US 1-9 south / US 1-9 Truck north – Newark, Jersey City | Southbound exit and northbound entrance; US 1-9 Truck not signed |
| Hudson | Kearny | 3.08 | 4.96 | 15W | I-280 west – Newark, Kearny | Eastern terminus of I-280 |
| Bergen | East Rutherford | 7.02 | 11.30 | 16W | Route 3 / Route 120 west – Secaucus, Rutherford | Access to MetLife Stadium; Route 120 not signed |
| Bergen | Carlstadt | 7.18 | 11.56 | Exit 18W Toll Plaza (northern end of ticket system) | | |
| Bergen | Carlstadt | 8.47– 8.95 | 13.63– 14.40 | 19W | Meadowlands Complex, American Dream | Northbound exit via U-turn ramp; E-ZPass-only toll on southbound exit and northbound entrance; access via Connection Road |
| Bergen | Ridgefield | 10.13– 10.43 | 16.30– 16.79 | — | Vince Lombardi Service Area | |
| Bergen | Ridgefield | 11.01 | 17.72 | — | To I-80 west – Paterson | Northbound left exit and southbound entrance |
| Bergen | Ridgefield | 11.26 | 18.12 | | I-95 north / N.J. Turnpike north to US 46 – George Washington Bridge | Northern terminus of the Western Spur (Route 95W) |
1.000 mi = 1.609 km; 1.000 km = 0.621 mi: Incomplete access; Tolled

=== Express Lanes and G.W. Bridge Upper Level Lanes ===
The entire route is in Bergen County.

| Location | mi | km | Exit | Destinations | Notes |
|---|---|---|---|---|---|
| Ridgefield Park–Teaneck line | 73.07 | 117.59 | | I-95 south / N.J. Turnpike south to US 46 – Newark | Southern terminus of express lanes |
| Teaneck | 73.59 | 118.43 | 69 | I-80 west (Express Lanes) to G.S. Parkway – Paterson | Eastern terminus and exit 68B on I-80 Express; southbound exit and northbound entrance |
| Fort Lee | 76.2– 76.53 | 122.6– 123.16 | 72A | Route 4 west – Paramus I-95 south (Local Lanes) / N.J. Turnpike south To I-80 west / G.S. Parkway – Hackensack | Southern terminus of Upper Level lanes, northern terminus of southbound Express Lanes; southbound exit and northbound entrance |
| Fort Lee | 76.62– 76.66 | 123.31– 123.37 | 72B | US 1-9 south / US 46 west – Palisades Park N.J. Turnpike ends | Southern end of US 1-9/US 46 concurrency southbound and US 1/US 46 concurrency northbound; southbound exit and northbound entrance |
| Fort Lee | 76.66 | 123.37 | South end of PANYNJ jurisdiction | | |
| Fort Lee | 77.18 | 124.21 | 73 | Route 67 / Hudson Terrace (CR 505) to US 9W / Palisades Parkway north – Fort Lee | Signed for US 9W/Hudson Terrace southbound, Palisades northbound; last northbound exit before toll |
| Fort Lee | 77.18 | 124.21 | | US 9 north | Northbound entrance only; southern end of US 9 concurrency northbound; northern terminus of express Lanes; southern terminus of northbound Upper Level lanes |
| Fort Lee | 77.53 | 124.77 | 74 | Palisades Parkway north | Southbound exit and northbound entrance from express lanes |
| Hudson River | 77.96 | 125.46 | George Washington Bridge (northbound toll; Pay-by-Plate or E-ZPass) | | |
| Hudson River | 77.96 | 125.46 | | I-95 north / US 1-9 north to I-87 US 46 ends | Continuation into New York at the river's center; eastern terminus of US 46 |
1.000 mi = 1.609 km; 1.000 km = 0.621 mi: Concurrency terminus; Electronic toll collection; Incomplete access; Route transition

== See also ==
Interstate 95
| Previous state: Pennsylvania | New Jersey | Next state: New York |
