= Shrewsbury Inlet =

Coordinates: 40.3986°N 73.9767°W

Shrewsbury Inlet was an inlet connecting the Shrewsbury River with the Atlantic Ocean in Monmouth County, New Jersey. The inlet is now closed and the Shrewsbury River connects to Sandy Hook Bay.

== Geography ==
Shrewsbury Inlet separated Sandy Hook from Wardell's Beach, both of which are now connected. The inlet, which shifted periodically, was approximately located at the boundary between Sea Bright and Middletown Township, at the base of Sandy Hook.

== History ==
Shrewsbury Inlet was described in 1834 as,

Shrewsbury Inlet, Old, was opened in 1778, from the ocean into the estuary formed by the Nevisink and Shrewsbury rivers, Monmouth co.; was closed by the moving of the sands in 1810, but was reopened in 1830. Vessels now pass through it.

Edwin Salter, former Speaker of the New Jersey General Assembly, in 1874 wrote about Shrewsbury Inlet in Old Times in Old Monmouth:

Shrewsbury Inlet was open in 1778; it closed again about 1800; again opened about 1830; and again closed about 1847. Just before the closing of this inlet at this time, the writer of this was engaged in the coasting trade and one time in sailing down the beach noticed a little steamer, called the Cricket, from New York, wrecked on the bar. This wreck seemed to hasten the closing of the inlet by gathering the sand around it as it washed in and out.

Shrewsbury Inlet was described in 1878, viz.,

This inlet, known as Shrewsbury Inlet, was navigable for several years, but closed in 1810. On the 16th day of January, 1831, it again broke through, again became navigable, and again closed July 8th, 1848, so that no boats could pass in, since which time Sandy Hook has preserved its peninsular condition.

By 1856 the construction of a railroad and related protective structures along the spit rendered the closing of the inlet more or less permanent, and access to the Shrewsbury River remains through Sandy Hook Bay.

== See also ==
- Sandy Hook
- Wardell's Beach
- Shrewsbury River
