= Wardell's Beach =

Barrier spit on Jersey Shore, New Jersey, U.S.

Coordinates: 40.3459°N 73.9732°W

Wardell's Beach is the historic name of a barrier spit located on the Jersey Shore of the Atlantic Ocean in Monmouth County, New Jersey, United States. It takes its name from Eliakim Wardell, an early owner, and his descendants. Since the 19th century it has been joined physically to Sandy Hook, and contains the boroughs of Monmouth Beach and Sea Bright.

== Geography ==
Wardell's Beach is a very narrow barrier peninsula that separates the Atlantic Ocean from the Shrewsbury River and is opposite the Shrewsbury's confluence with the Navesink River. It is on its southern end joined to the mainland, and joins Sandy Hook to the north.

== History ==
It was described in 1834 as,

on the Atlantic ocean, Shrewsbury t-ship, Monmouth co., extending south from Old Shrewsbury Inlet.

Shrewsbury Inlet closed in late 1848. By 1856 the construction of a railroad along the spit rendered the closing of the inlet more or less permanent. By 1878 the name Wardell's Beach was falling into disuse, viz,

Immediately south of the site of old Shrewsbury Inlet is a strip of sandy shore formerly known as Wardell's Beach. It is about five miles long, and was at one time owned mostly, if not entirely, by Major Wardell. In the march of progress it has outgrown the tenure of one man, and is now divided among the wealthy and enterprising owners of the beautiful villas of Seabright and Monmouth Beach. This strip of beach is quite narrow in a part of its length, having on its inner shore the South Shrewsbury River, one of the branches of the stream that flows into Sandy Hook Bay at the foot of the Highlands.

Since that time, Wardell's Beach is normally only identified under the names of the two municipalities located upon it, Monmouth Beach and Sea Bright.
