= Galilee, New Jersey =

Populated place in Monmouth County, New Jersey, US

- Unincorporated community
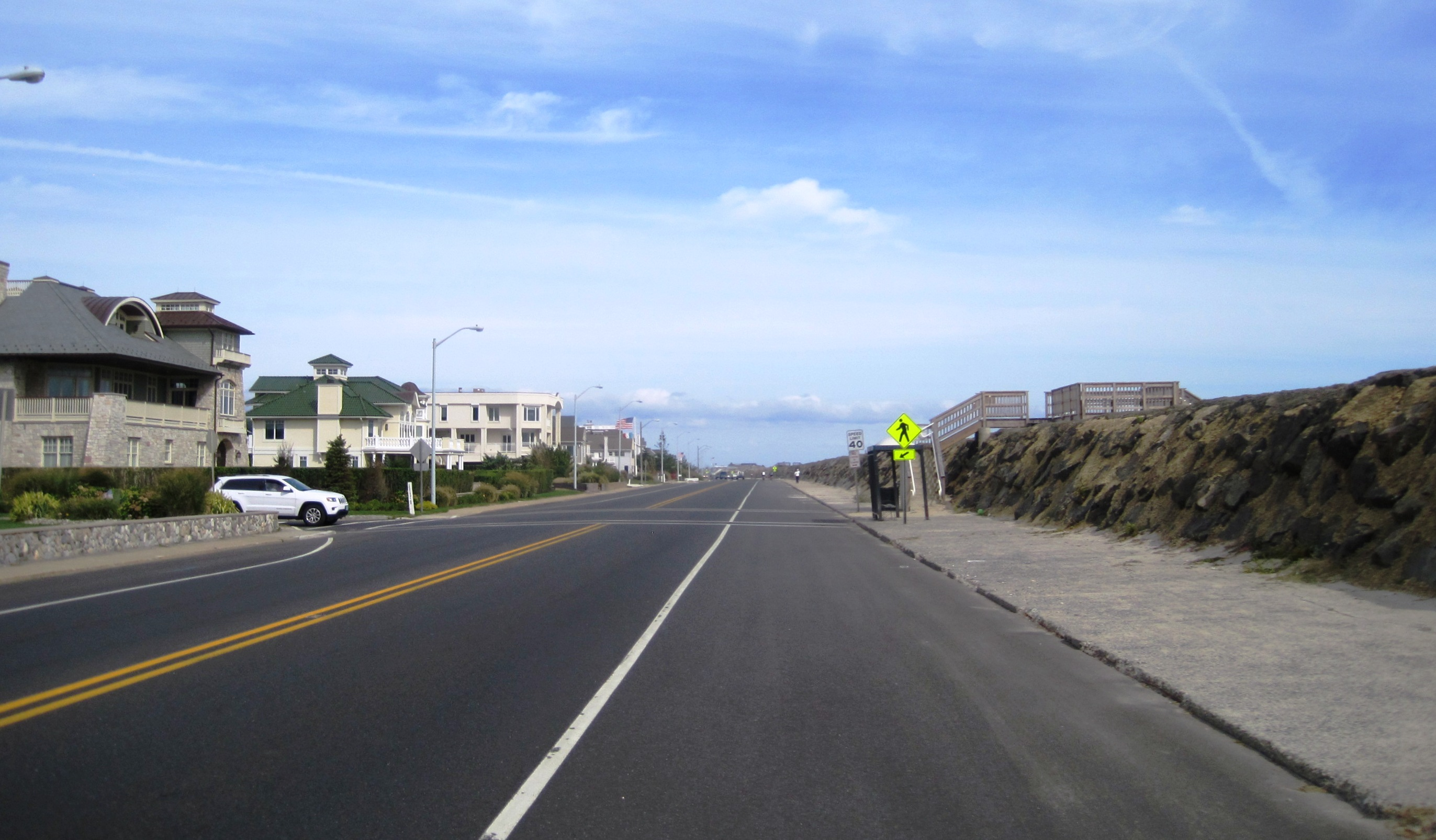
- At the intersection of Route 36 and Central Avenue

- Location in Monmouth County. Inset: Location of county within the state of New Jersey Galilee (New Jersey) Galilee (the United States)
- Coordinates: 40°20′11″N 73°58′27″W
- Country: United States
- State: New Jersey
- County: Monmouth
- Borough: Monmouth Beach
- Named for: Galilee
- Elevation: 7 ft (2.1 m)
- GNIS feature ID: 882462

Galilee is an unincorporated community located within Monmouth Beach in Monmouth County, in the U.S. state of New Jersey. The area is named for the Biblical city of Galilee and was founded as a fishing village. Located at the northern extent of Monmouth Beach, it is located along the peninsula where it begins to greatly narrow between the Shrewsbury River and the Atlantic Ocean. Single family homes typically make up the ocean side of the peninsula while condominiums and a marina are located on the river side. The Sea Bright–Monmouth Beach Seawall passes through the community and continues to neighboring Sea Bright.
