= Monmouth Beach School District =

School district in Monmouth County, New Jersey, US

Coordinates: 40.329609°N 73.985024°W

Address
- 7 Hastings Place Monmouth Beach, Monmouth County, New Jersey, 07750; United States

District information
- Grades: PreK-8
- Superintendent: Yelena Horre
- Business administrator: Peter E. Genovese III
- Schools: 1

Students and staff
- Enrollment: 257 (as of 2022–23)
- Faculty: 36.4 FTEs
- Student–teacher ratio: 7.1:1

Other information
- District Factor Group: I
- Website: www.mbschool.org
Ind.	Per pupil	District spending	Rank (*)	K-8 average	%± vs. average
1A	Total Spending	$16,209	11	$18,891	−14.2%
1	Budgetary Cost	13,921	21	14,159	−1.7%
2	Classroom Instruction	8,864	30	8,659	2.4%
6	Support Services	1,645	14	2,167	−24.1%
8	Administrative Cost	1,462	17	1,547	−5.5%
10	Operations & Maintenance	1,684	28	1,612	4.5%
13	Extracurricular Activities	223	49	104	114.4%
16	Median Teacher Salary	56,845	29	61,136
Data from NJDoE 2014 Taxpayers' Guide to Education Spending. *Of K-8 districts with up to 400 students. Lowest spending=1; Highest=71

The Monmouth Beach School District is a community public school district that serves students in pre-kindergarten through eighth grade from Monmouth Beach, in Monmouth County, in the U.S. state of New Jersey.

As of the 2022–23 school year, the district, comprised of one school, had an enrollment of 257 students and 36.4 classroom teachers (on an FTE basis), for a student–teacher ratio of 7.1:1.

The district is classified by the New Jersey Department of Education as being in District Factor Group "I", the second-highest of eight groupings. District Factor Groups organize districts statewide to allow comparison by common socioeconomic characteristics of the local districts. From lowest socioeconomic status to highest, the categories are A, B, CD, DE, FG, GH, I and J.

Public school students in ninth through twelfth grades attend Shore Regional High School, a regional high school that also serves students from the constituent districts of Oceanport, Sea Bright and West Long Branch. The high school is located in West Long Branch and is part of the Shore Regional High School District. As of the 2018–19 school year, the high school had an enrollment of 649 students and 57.2 classroom teachers (on an FTE basis), for a student–teacher ratio of 11.3:1.

Public school students from Monmouth Beach, and all of Monmouth County, are eligible to apply to attend the schools of the Monmouth County Vocational School District.

== Schools ==
Monmouth Beach School served an enrollment of 234 students in grades PreK-8 in the 2018–19 school year.

- Jessica L. Alfone, principal

Karen Ginty, a kindergarten teacher at Monmouth Beach Elementary School who had been at the school for 33 years, was named the 2006-07 New Jersey State Teacher of the Year.

== Administration ==
Core members of the district's administration are:

- Rocco Tomazic, interim superintendent
- Peter E. Genovese III, business administrator and board secretary

== Board of education ==
The district's board of education, comprised of nine members, sets policy and oversees the fiscal and educational operation of the district through its administration. As a Type II school district, the board's trustees are elected directly by voters to serve three-year terms of office on a staggered basis, with three seats up for election each year held (since 2012) as part of the November general election. The board appoints a superintendent to oversee the district's day-to-day operations and a business administrator to supervise the business functions of the district.
