= Sea Bright–Monmouth Beach Seawall =

Seawall in New Jersey

Coordinates: 40.358927°N 73.974343°W

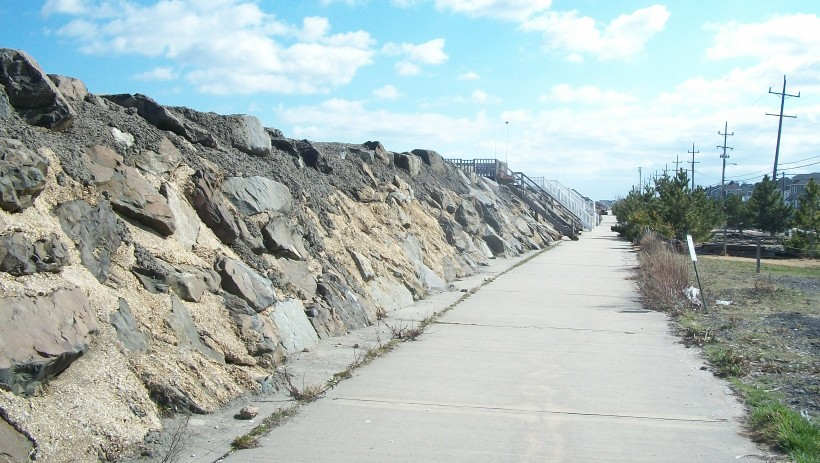
At Sea Bright, facing south

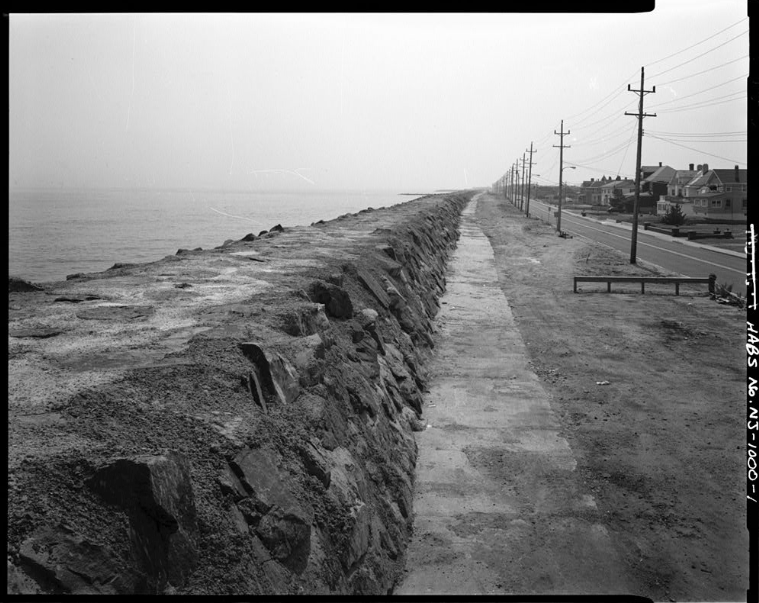
Historical photo of the seawall

The Sea Bright–Monmouth Beach Seawall is a seawall located along the Jersey Shore in the Monmouth County, New Jersey towns of Sea Bright and Monmouth Beach. It roughly runs north-south direction along 4.7 miles (7.6 km) of the barrier spit of land along the lower Sandy Hook peninsula between the Atlantic Ocean and the Shrewsbury River estuary. The use of seawalls, groins, jetties, bulkheads, revetment, and beach nourishment since the late 1800s has made the stretch of coast one of the most heavily engineered sections of ocean shorefront in the world.

The effects of Hurricane Sandy wrought serious damage to the area in 2012. The reconstruction of the seawall, including new construction of 3,188 ft (972 m) in gaps where it had not previously existed began in 2017 and will be completed in 2018. The storm precipitated reconsideration of seawalls and other methods of coastal protection to mitigate storm surges and sea level rise along the coast. The seawall has also been previously used as a filming location.

== Geography and jurisdiction ==
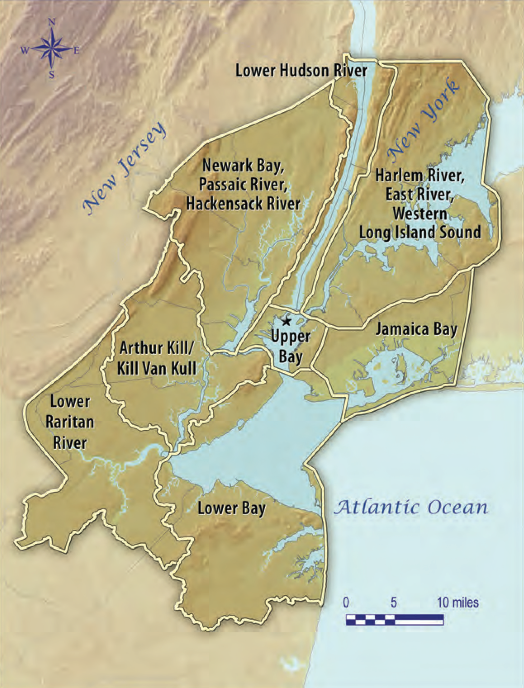
USACE New York-New Jersey harbor estuary map 2016

The Sea Bright communities of Navesink Beach, Normandie, Downtown, and Low Moor and the northern portion of Monmouth Beach, known as Galilee, are located on the barrier spit of land south of the Sandy Hook peninsula (part of the Gateway National Recreation Area) between the Atlantic Ocean and the Shrewsbury River estuary. The peninsula is generally 1,000 ft (300 m) wide with an elevation of between 5 ft (1.5 m) and 10 ft (3.0 m) and forms western approach to the Port of New York and New Jersey. The seawall begins south of the Highlands – Sea Bright Bridge and lies between the beach and Route 36, locally known as Ocean Avenue, which is part of the New Jersey Coastal Heritage Trail Route.

The New Jersey Department of Environmental Protection (NJDEP) Division of Coastal Engineering is responsible for coastal protection along the Jersey Shore based on the New Jersey Shore Protection Master Plan developed in 1981.

The United States Army Corps of Engineers (USACE) New York District coordinates the projects. In 2016 the USACE and the Port Authority of New York and New Jersey produced a comprehensive restoration plan for the extended harbor region, which included proposals to mitigate the effects of sea-level rise through projects to restore natural areas.

In the aftermath of Hurricane Sandy in 2012 funding for seawall reconstruction has been provided by the Federal Emergency Management Agency (FEMA).

== Seawall ==
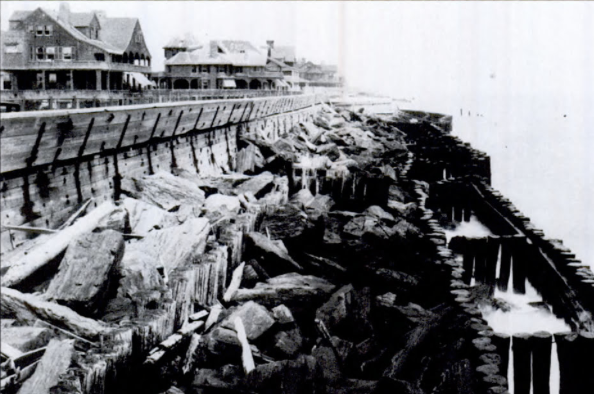
1920s

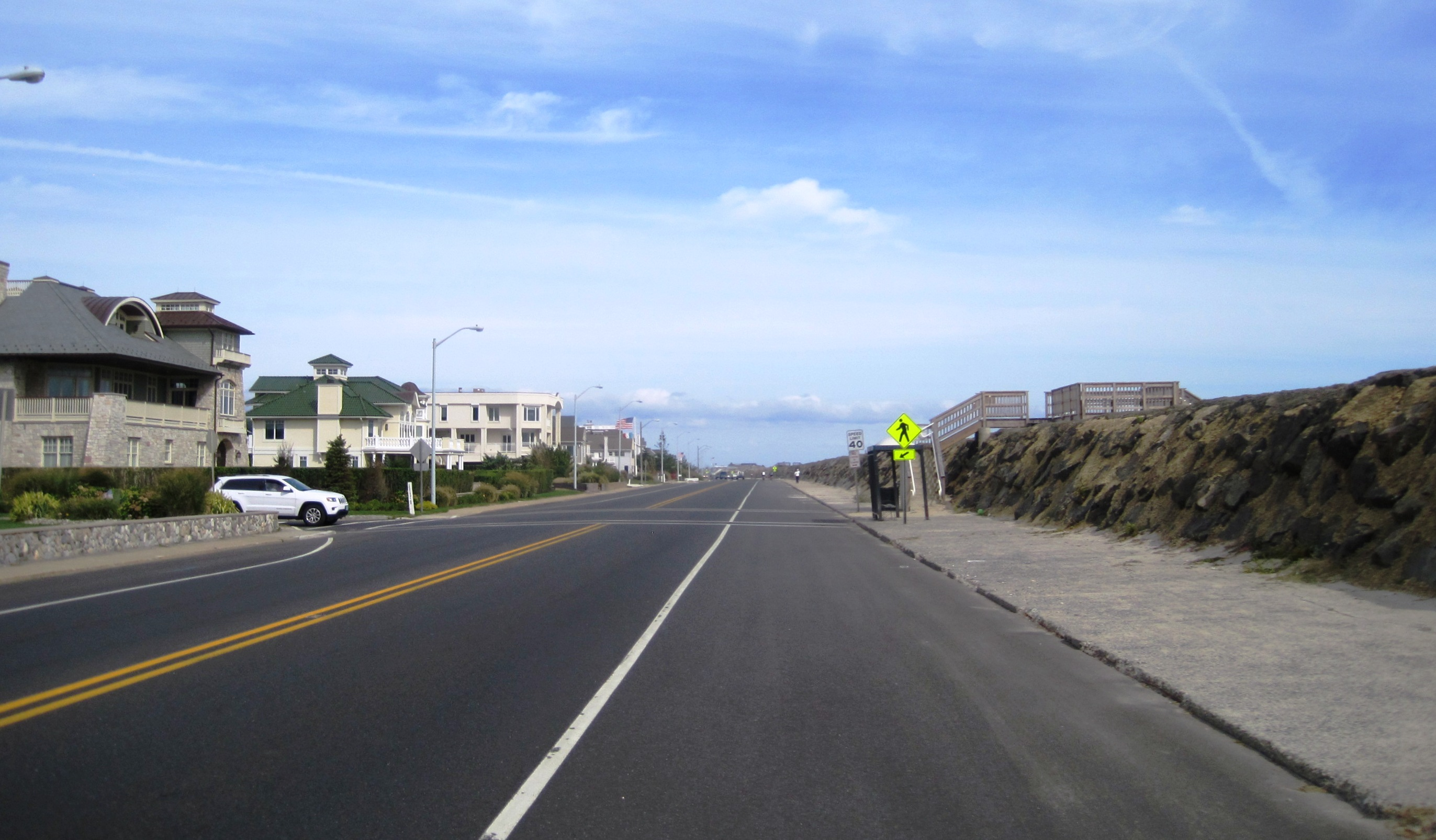
Along Route 36 in 2015

Development of the area began in the 1860s when the coast became a resort. Since then the use of seawalls, groins (jetties), bulkheads, revetment, and beach nourishment has made the stretch of coast one of the most heavily engineered sections of ocean shorefront in the world. As described by geologist Orrin H. Pilkey the beaches have been "New Jerseyized", meaning to say that the beaches have (at one time or another) all but eroded completely leaving seawalls or the detritus of previous ones.

New Jersey Southern Railroad built a 2,000-foot trestle and a seawall on the ocean side of the narrow peninsula in the 1870s, and rebuilt it again in 1881. To protect Fort Hancock the U.S. Army constructed a seawall between Sandy Hook and Sea Bright in 1898. At times there was not beachfront between Sandy Hook and Long Branch. The seawall was built in phases between 1914 and 1962. The parent of NJS, the Central Railroad of New Jersey abandoned the property in 1950. The state did not opt to buy the 3.5 miles (5.6 km) strip of land that had been the railroad's right of way. The state built a new seawall starting in 1946 into the 1950s. By the late 1980s, the seawall had seriously deteriorated and repairs were undertaken in 1990.

The region has experienced serious storms and hurricanes including those in 1938, 1944, 1950, 1955, 1960, 1962, 1972, 1976, 1984, 1985, 1991. Hurricane Sandy in 2012 devastated the shore. As of 2015, the funds allocated for the project to repair and/or replace the seawall was $34,827,594.00, 90 percent of which came from Federal Emergency Management Agency (FEMA), with the State of New Jersey funding the remaining 10 percent. The reconstruction of the seawall, including new construction of 3,188 ft (972 m) in gaps where it had not previously existed was set to begin in 2017. The height of the wall is approximately 17 ft (5.2 m).

== Beach nourishment ==
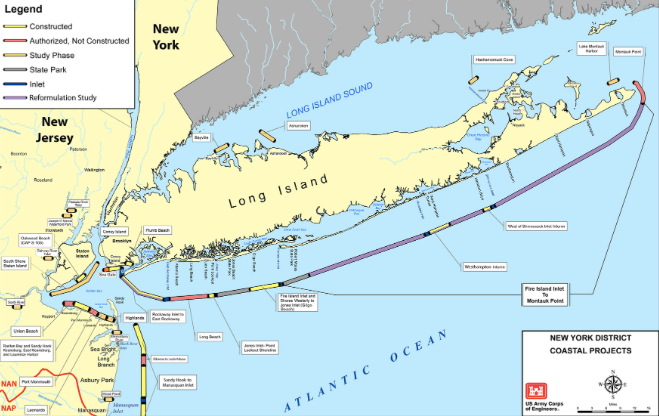
USACE Coastal Storm Risk Reduction efforts in the NY-NJ region include projects along the shore at Sea Bright and Monmouth Beach

Since the Ash Wednesday Storm of 1962 beaches along the shores of the East Coast have been regularly replenished with sand pumped in from off-shore. A multi-year project in for replacing sand began in 1994 by the USACE and originally completed in 2001 and been renourished 4 times since then. After Hurricane Sandy, approximately 5 million cubic yards of sand from the beaches in the area were washed away. The USACE in 2014 replaced more than 8 million cubic yards of sand thus restoring the project area to its original design profile. The practice has become controversial due to environmental and economic concerns.

== Beach access ==
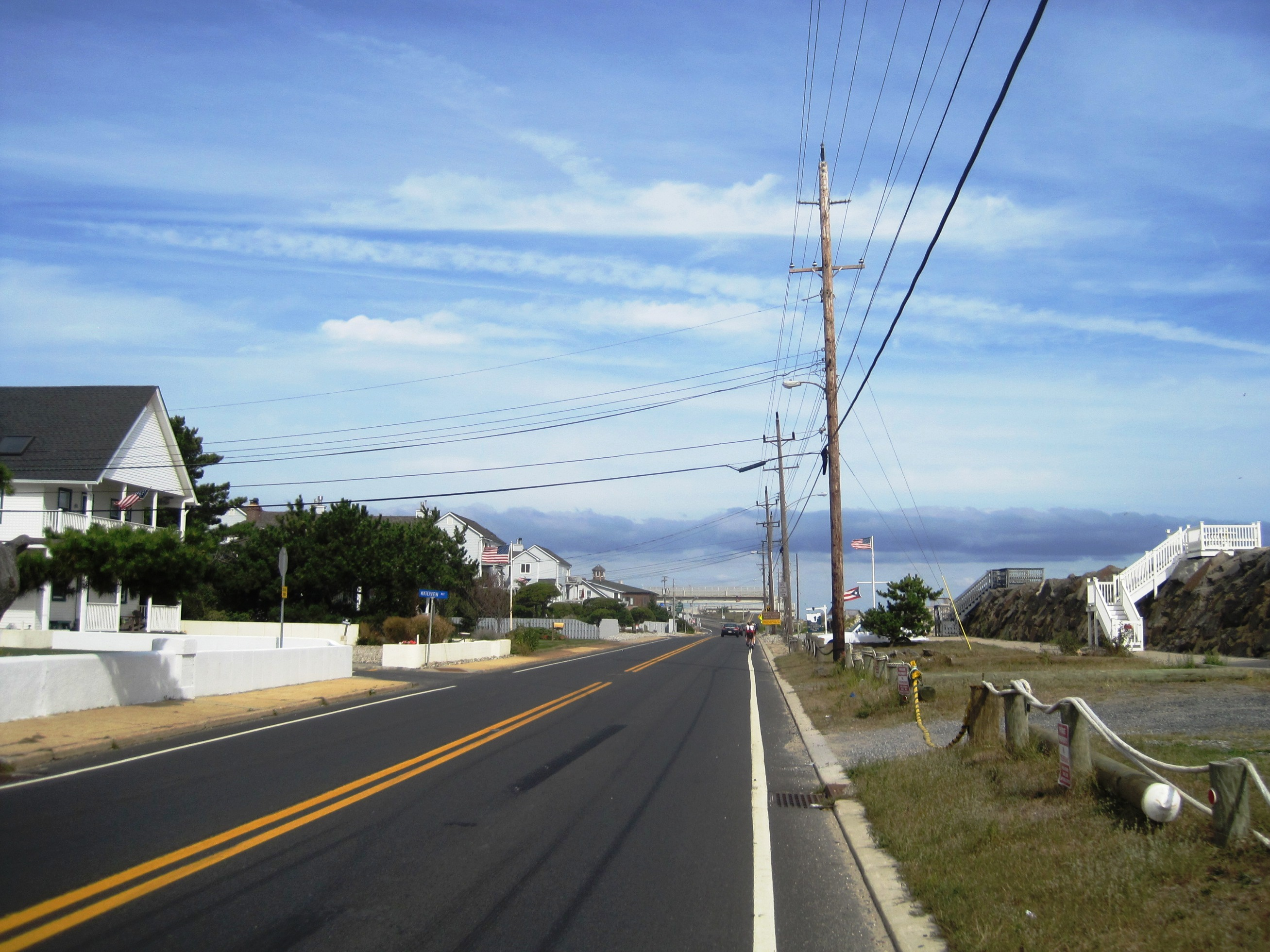
Privately owned decks atop the seawall must provide public linear passage along it

The parent of NJS, the Central Railroad of New Jersey abandoned the property in 1950. The state did not opt to buy the 3.5 miles (5.6 km) strip of the land that had been the railroad's right of way. Parts of the land came into the hands of private property owners. As outlined in the Public Trust Doctrine, public access is the "ability of the public to pass physically and visually to, from and along the ocean shore", including perpendicular and linear access.

Beach access on and beyond the seawall has been unclear or contentious in Sea Bright and less so in Monmouth Beach. A 1993 agreement between the State of New Jersey Department of Environmental Protection and nine private beach clubs in Sea Bright allowed easements along club's oceanfront for replenishment project. The general public was only permitted to walk along 15-foot swath of sand above the water line, but not otherwise use the beach. In 2010, the Superior Court of New Jersey voided the agreement. After an appeal one club which had contested was also ordered by the Appellate Court to comply.

== See also ==
- Rip-rap
- Nor'easter
- Headland
- Geography of New York–New Jersey Harbor Estuary
- East Shore Seawall
- New York Harbor Storm-Surge Barrier
