= Normandie, New Jersey =

Populated place in Monmouth County, New Jersey, US

- Unincorporated community
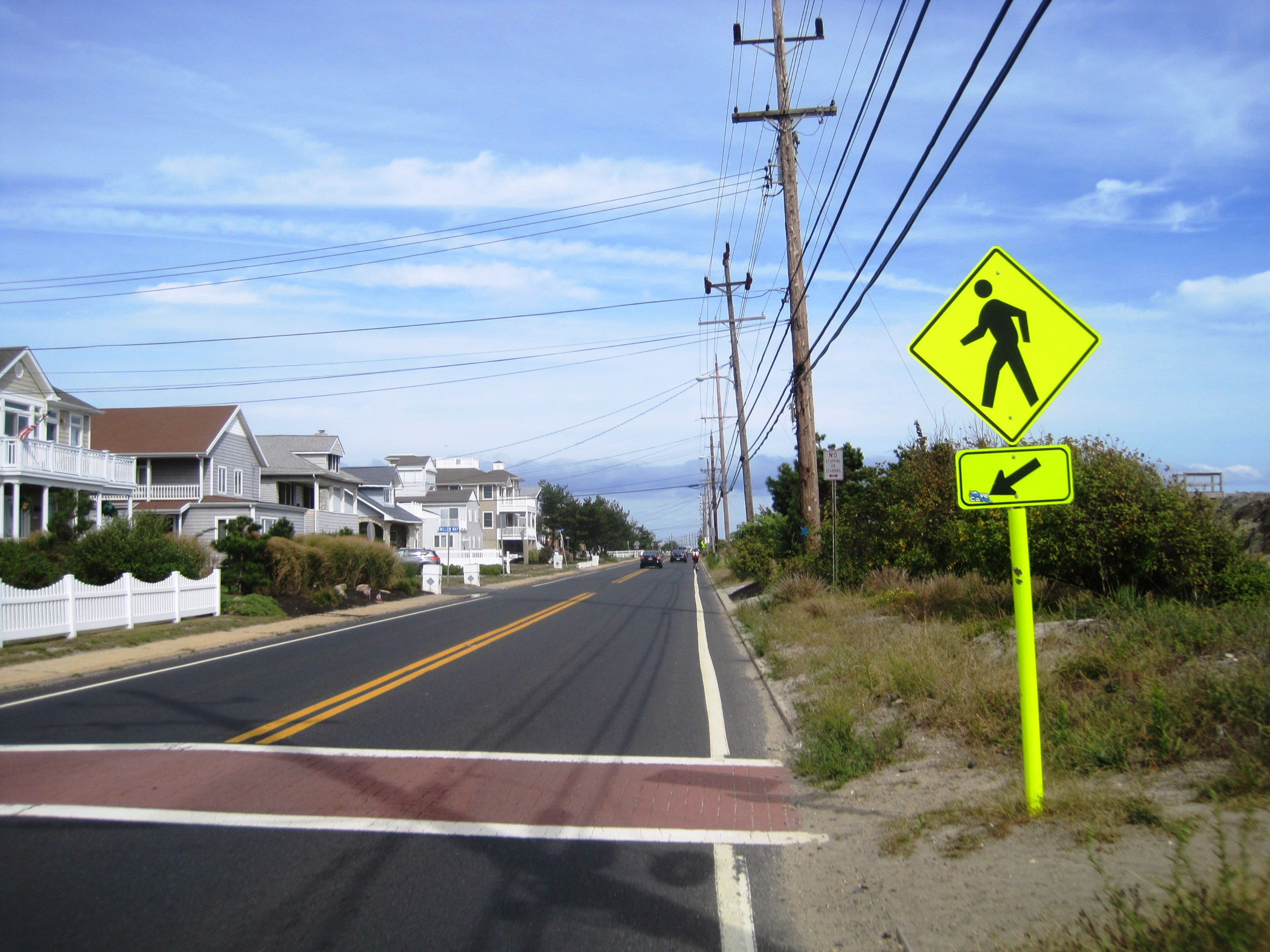
- Along Route 36 at Willow Way

- Location in Monmouth County. Inset: Location of county within the state of New Jersey Normandie (New Jersey) Normandie (the United States)
- Coordinates: 40°22′47″N 73°58′30″W
- Country: United States
- State: New Jersey
- County: Monmouth
- Borough: Sea Bright
- Elevation: 10 ft (3.0 m)
- GNIS feature ID: 882521

Normandie is an unincorporated community located within Sea Bright in Monmouth County, in the U.S. state of New Jersey. The community is one of the four main built-up areas of Sea Bright and is a former stop on the New Jersey Southern Railroad. It is located along Route 36 between the CR 520 drawbridge to Rumson and Sandy Hook on a narrow strip of land between the Shrewsbury River and the Atlantic Ocean. The Sea Bright–Monmouth Beach Seawall passes through the neighborhood and Navesink Beach.
