= Werning =

Werning is a surname. Notable people with the surname include:

- Iván Werning (born 1974), Argentine economist
- Paula Werning, Finnish politician

== See also ==
- Wenning
