= Pleasant Bay =

Pleasant Bay may refer to:

- Pleasant Bay, Cape Cod, Orleans, Massachusetts, United States
- Pleasant Bay, Nova Scotia, Canada
- Pleasant Bay (Maine), United States

== See also ==
- Pleasure Bay, a tributary of the Shrewsbury River in Monmouth County, New Jersey, United States
