= Navesink Beach, New Jersey =

Populated place in Monmouth County, New Jersey, US

- Unincorporated community
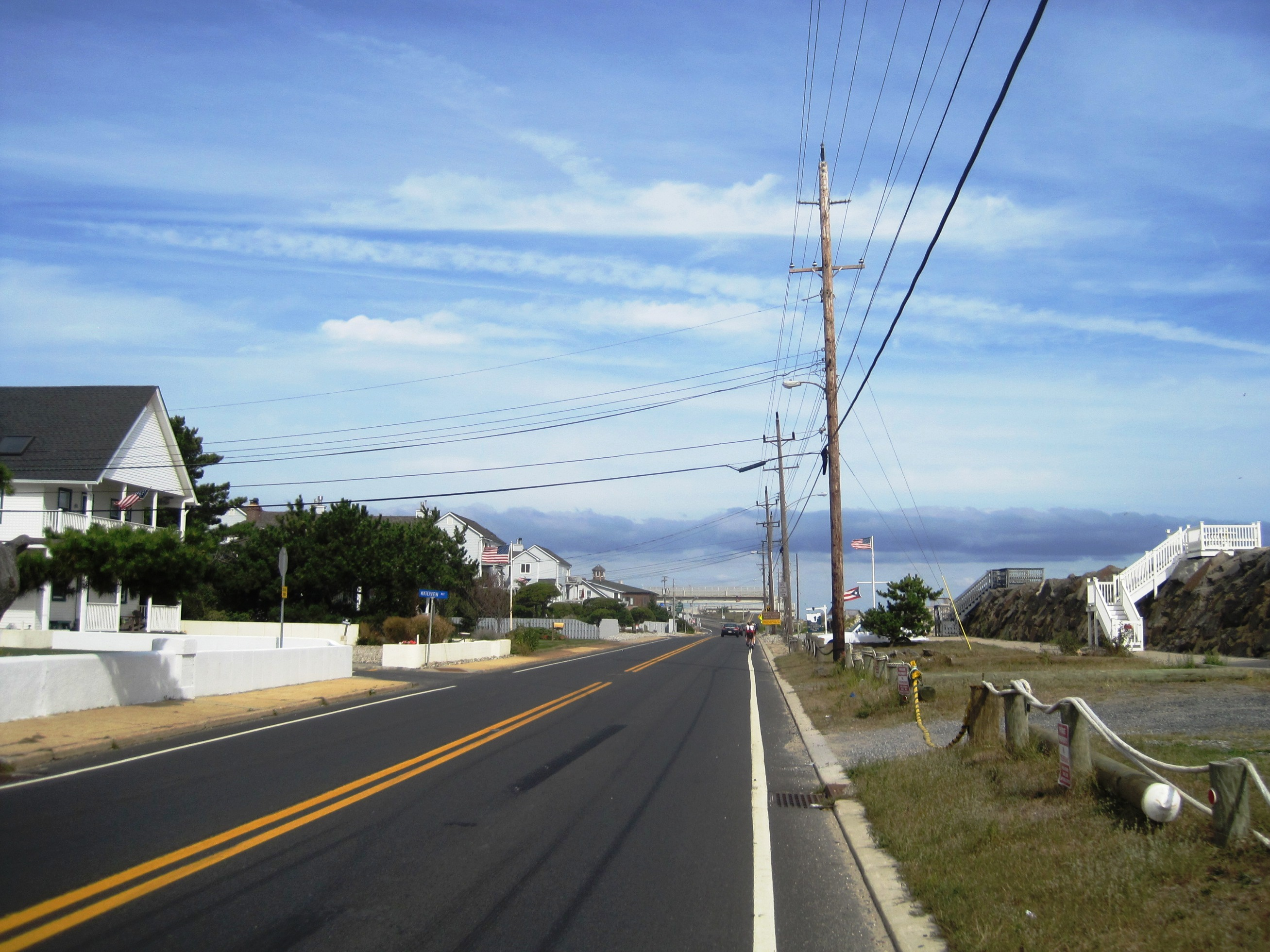
- Route 36 and Waterview Way looking north; the entrance to Sandy Hook is ahead

- Location of Navesink Beach in Monmouth County Inset: Location of county within the state of New Jersey Navesink Beach (New Jersey) Navesink Beach (the United States)
- Coordinates: 40°23′22″N 73°58′31″W
- Country: United States
- State: New Jersey
- County: Monmouth
- Borough: Sea Bright
- Elevation: 7 ft (2.1 m)
- GNIS feature ID: 882600

Navesink Beach is an unincorporated community located within Sea Bright in Monmouth County, in the U.S. state of New Jersey. It is one of the four main built-up areas of Sea Bright and is the northernmost settled area of the borough. Navesink Beach is a former stop on the New Jersey Southern Railroad. The Sea Bright–Monmouth Beach Seawall passes through the neighborhood and Normandie.
