= Priscilla Ransohoff =

American education specialist

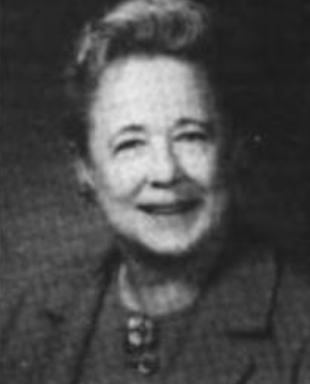
- Priscilla B. Ransohoff, from a 1972 publication of the U.S. Army
- Born: Mary Priscilla Burnett; June 16, 1912; Pittsburgh, Pennsylvania, United States
- Died: February 1, 1992 (aged 79); Monmouth Beach, New Jersey, United States
- Occupation: Education specialist
- Known for: National president of Federally Employed Women (1972–1974)

Priscilla Burnett Johnston Ransohoff (June 16, 1912 – February 1, 1992) was an American military education specialist and advocate for women in science and federal employment. She was an education officer in the United States Army's Electronics Command, based in New Jersey, and the national president of Federally Employed Women (FEW) from 1972 to 1974.

== Early life and education ==
Mary Priscilla Burnett was born in Pittsburgh, the daughter of Levi Herr Burnett and Clara Amelia Brown Burnett. Her father was a steel company executive, and mayor of Sea Girt, New Jersey. She graduated from the University of Pittsburgh, and earned a master's degree and an Ed.D. from Columbia University, in educational administration and psychology.

== Career ==
In the 1940s and 1950s, Burnett was supervisor of the physical therapy department at Monmouth Memorial Hospital, where her second husband was a surgeon. She taught a course on human relations for nursing supervisors at Rutgers University in 1955.

Ransohoff was an education officer with the United States Army's Electronics Command (ECOM) at Fort Monmouth, beginning in 1964. She became the ECOM coordinator for the Federal Woman's Program in 1968. She was the fourth national president of Federally Employed Women (FEW), in office from 1972 to 1974, and the first leader of that organization working outside of the Washington, D.C. area. In 1975, she received the first Army Materiel Command Action Award and the Department of the Army's Equal Employment Opportunity Award, both recognizing her work on equality in the federal workplace.

Ransohoff had a private consulting business, and taught at Brookdale Community College and Ocean County College. She was the founder of the Monmouth Center for Vocational Rehabilitation, in Tinton Falls. She served on the board of directors for the Easter Seal Society of New Jersey. She was named Woman of the Year by the Business and Professional Women's Club of Monmouth County in 1976, and given the same honor in 1984 and 1990 by the Zonta Club of Monmouth County.

== Personal life and legacy ==
Burnett married twice. Her first husband was insurance agent James Hampton Johnston. They married in 1934 and had a daughter, also named Priscilla Burnett Johnston, born in 1936. Her second husband was orthopedic surgeon Nicholas S. Ransohoff; they married in 1947. Her second husband died in 1951, and she died in 1992, at the age of 79, at her home in Monmouth Beach, New Jersey, where she had moved in 1960 after living in Long Branch, New Jersey.

From 1992 to 2005, the CECOM Priscilla B. Ransohoff Memorial Award was awarded in her memory. She was posthumously inducted into the Army Materiel Command Hall of Fame in 2022. “It is important to recognize Dr. Ransohoff for her pioneering efforts in fostering equality and diversity in the workforce, and her actions to encourage women to have a strong voice and role in the federal workforce,” commented military historian Susan Thompson of her induction.
