= Holly Beach City, New Jersey =

Former borough in New Jersey, United States

Coordinates: 38.9957°N 74.8275°W

Holly Beach City was a borough that existed in Cape May County, New Jersey, United States, from 1885 to 1912.

== History ==
The municipality was first formed as Holly Beach, which was incorporated as a borough by an Act of the New Jersey Legislature on April 14, 1885, from portions of Lower Township, based on the results of a referendum held on March 31, 1885. The borough was reincorporated on April 1, 1890, based on a referendum held the previous day.

The borough was reincorporated as Holly Beach City on May 4, 1897.

On January 1, 1912, the area was included as part of the newly created Wildwood, New Jersey, and the borough was dissolved.

== Notable residents ==
- Jeanette DuBois Meech (1835–1911), evangelist and industrial educator
- Charles L. Walters (c. 1862–1894), politician who served in the New Jersey General Assembly.
