= Charles L. Walters =

American politician

Charles L. Walters (c. 1862 – June 20, 1894) was an American politician who served for two years as Mayor of Sea Bright, New Jersey and in the New Jersey General Assembly.

== Biography ==
Born in Hightstown, New Jersey, Walters moved to Holly Beach City (now part of Wildwood), where he was elected in 1884 to serve on that municipality's council. He became the postmaster of Sea Bright, New Jersey in 1888, serving in that position for four years. In February 1892, he was elected to serve as a commissioner of Sea Bright, and was chosen to serve as mayor. In 1893, he was elected as a Republican to represent the second district of Monmouth County, New Jersey in the New Jersey General Assembly, defeating Democrat Thomas Fay. He died at his home in Sea Bright on June 20, 1894.

In 1898, the New Jersey branch of the Junior Order of United American Mechanics proposed the construction of a monument to honor Walters for his efforts to require all public schools in the state to fly the American flag.
