= Jeanette DuBois Meech =

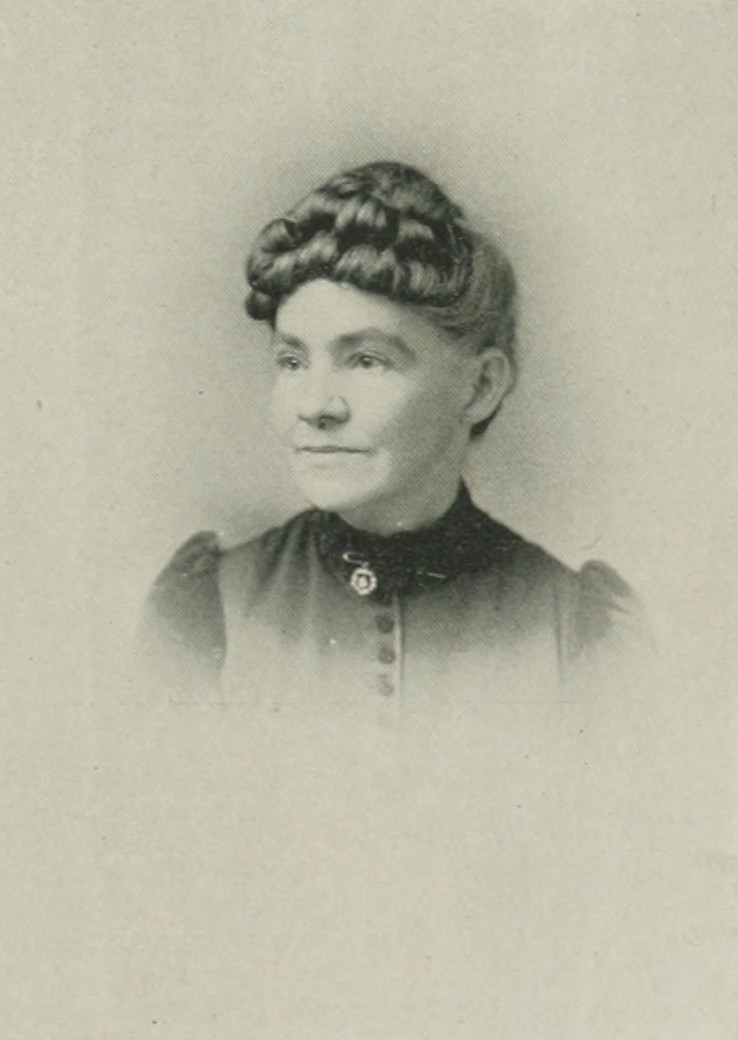
"A Woman of the Century"

Jeanette DuBois Meech (née Dubois; August 10, 1835 – February 6, 1911) was an American evangelist and industrial educator. She was well known as an evangelist, who married a Baptist clergyman.

For many years, Meech taught school in Philadelphia, and was a teacher in the Maryland State Industrial School for Girls. She served as principal of the Industrial Art School in Vineland, New Jersey and in Jersey Shore, Pennsylvania. She was licensed to preach in South Vineland, where she was assistant pastor for seven years. She was a county superintendent and national lecturer in narcotics for the Woman's Christian Temperance Union (W.C.T.U.), all the while maintaining her interest in industrial education, and supporting her family by a successful business career. She also served as president of various societies.

== Early life and education ==
Jeanette DuBois (or Jeannette Du Bois) was born in Frankford, Philadelphia, Pennsylvania, August 10, 1835. Her father, Gideon Du Bois (1809-1891), was descended from the French-Huguenots, He was a deacon in the Baptist Church for nearly half a century. Her mother, Annie Grant (1810-1896), was a Scotch woman and came to the U.S. when a girl. Meech's siblings were Benjamin, Annie, Jennie, Gedion, and Idia.

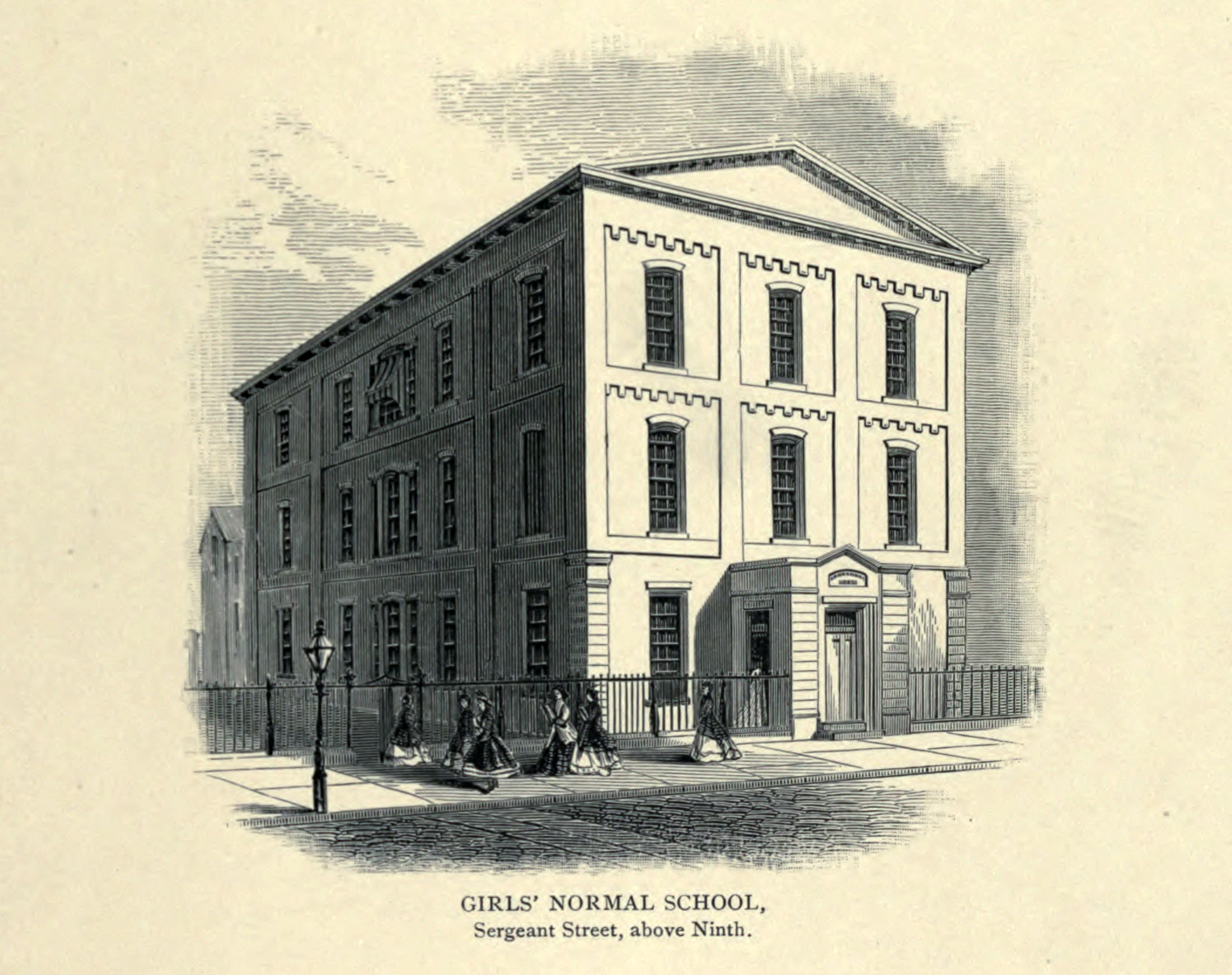
Girls Normal School (Philadelphia, 1853)

Meech learned to read when she was four years old. The first public school in Frankford was built opposite to her home, in 1840, and she attended it as soon as it was opened. She went through all the departments, and afterwards was graduated from the Philadelphia Normal School (now, Philadelphia High School for Girls.

Meech was converted in 1850 and became a member of the Baptist Church at the age of 15.

== Career ==
After graduation, Meech began teaching in the Frankford school, and taught there eight years, resigning her position in 1860.

On June 4, 1861, in Trenton, New Jersey, she married Rev. William Witter Meech (1825-1908), then pastor of the Baptist Church, in Burlington, New Jersey. During the Civil War (1861-65), her husband was a hospital chaplain. She was with him in Louisville, Kentucky, and while there, helped in a mission school in the suburbs. He was afterwards stationed in Bowling Green, Kentucky, and there she had a Sunday-school class in the convalescent ward of the hospital.

In 1869, during her husband's pastorate in Jersey Shore, Pennsylvania, she opened a free industrial school in the parsonage, with 100 scholars, boys and girls. The boys were taught to sew and knit, as well as the girls. She provided all the material and utensils and sold the work when it was finished.

In 1870, her husband was chosen superintendent of the Maryland State Industrial School for Girls. There, she had an opportunity to develop her ideas. The materials were provided, and they taught cooking, canning and housekeeping as well as sewing, reading, writing, drawing, arithmetic and music. Mrs. Meech had to conduct the religious meetings with the girls, on account of her husband's loss of voice. A remarkable revival began in the school and all but four of the girls became Christians. Her husband lost his health, and they were obliged to give up the work.

Mr. Meech served pastor of the South Vineland Baptist Church for seventeen years. During his vacations, Mrs. Meech frequently filled his place. She addressed an audience for the first time in Meadville, Pennsylvania, in 1867, in a Sunday-school convention.

=== New Jersey ===
They went to Vineland, New Jersey, in search of health in 1873, and lived there till their deaths. Her oldest daughter was an invalid and could not be sent to school at that time, and Mrs. Meech invited a few of the neighbor's children to make a class in her home, that she might have companionship for her daughter in her studies. She continued that "Cottage Seminary" till the daughter was able to go from home to school, and then she started an "Industrial Society," composed mainly of scholars from the Vineland high school, in 1875. The boys were taught to make a variety of articles in wood and wire work. The girls cut and made garments and fancy articles.

Mrs. Meech started a Sunday-school in Vineland Center, in the face of obstacles, and conducted it for ten years, serving as superintendent, collecting a library and training teachers for the work. Many of the pupils were converted, and the school became known far and wide. In connection with her Sunday-school work, she organized a society for missionary information in 1877. A correspondence was opened with missionaries in China, and she set to work to study up the customs and religions of China, Japan and India, in order to interest her scholars in the work in those countries. They always had a full house on missionary Sunday. Her lectures were given by request in a number of churches, school-houses and conventions. One young lady, a member of one of her societies, became a missionary in Japan.

She edited the Holly Beach Herald in 1885, but could not continue it for want of means. She was engaged in business as a florist and art store-keeper for some years.

In 1887, Mrs. Meech was appointed by the trustees of the Vineland high school to introduce there and to superintend the department of manual education. This plan was only partially carried out.

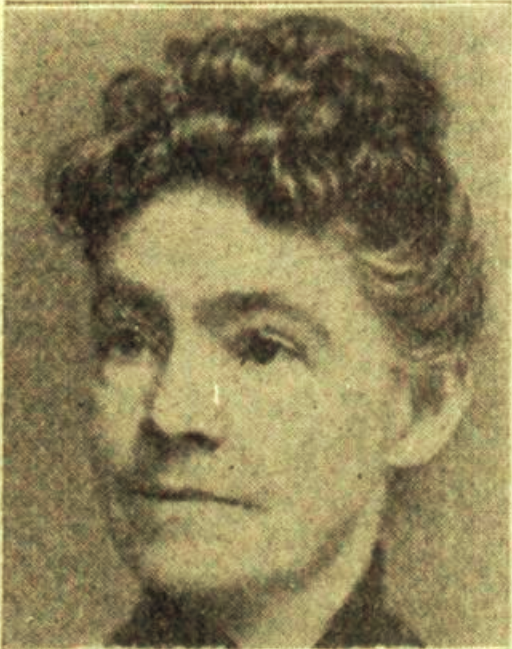
(undated)

In 1890, in company with Mrs. Ives, of Philadelphia, she commenced a series of cottage prayer meetings in Holly Beach City, New Jersey. They visited from house to house, talking with unconverted people and inviting them to the meetings. The religious interest was great. Since then, she frequently held Sunday evening services in the Holly Beach Church, which was Presbyterian in denomination, and which years earlier, refused her the use of their church for a missionary lecture, because she was a woman.

In March 1891, the South Vineland Baptist Church granted her a license to preach. After receiving that license, Mrs. Meech held a number of meetings on Sunday evenings in Wildwood, New Jersey, and in Atlantic City, New Jersey.

She held aloof from temperance societies till 1889 when she joined the W.C.T.U. She was made county superintendent of narcotics the first year. In 1891, she received an appointment as national lecturer for the W.C.T.U. in the department of narcotics.

== Personal life ==
Rev. Meech held pastorates in various cities. From 1875, he was pastor in South Vineland, New Jersey. In 1862, he was appointed by Abraham Lincoln as hospital chaplain; and served at Newport News, Louisville, and Bowling Green. He was afterward regimental chaplain with the rank of major. In later years, he was a fruit grower. He was the author of a book entitled Quince Culture.

The couple had two daughters, the elder of whom married and had two daughters (Anne D. and Lydia J.).

Jeanette D. Meech died at her home in Holly Beach, New Jersey, February 6, 1911, and was buried at Siloam Cemetery.
