= Wenning =

Wenning is a surname. Notable people with the surname include:

- Brian Wenning (born 1981), American skateboarder
- Gregor Wenning (born 1964), German neurologist
- Keith Wenning (born 1991), American football player
- Michael Wenning (1935–2011), American minister
- Pieter Wenning (1873–1921), South African painter and etcher

== Other uses ==
- River Wenning, in North Yorkshire and Lancashire, England
