= Pleasure Bay =

River in New Jersey, United States

- Location within New Jersey
- Location: New Jersey
- Coordinates: 40°19′59″N 73°59′53″W
- Type: Tributary

Pleasure Bay is a tributary of the Shrewsbury River in Monmouth County, New Jersey in the United States.

Pleasure Bay is an estuary formed by the confluence of Branchport Creek and Troutmans Creek, flowing north to the Shrewsbury River. A short distance above the mouth, Manahasset Creek enters the bay.

Pleasure Bay forms the boundary of Oceanport with Long Branch and Monmouth Beach.

== Tributaries ==
- Branchport Creek
- Troutmans Creek
- Manahasset Creek

== See also ==
- List of rivers of New Jersey
