= Highlands–Sea Bright Bridge =

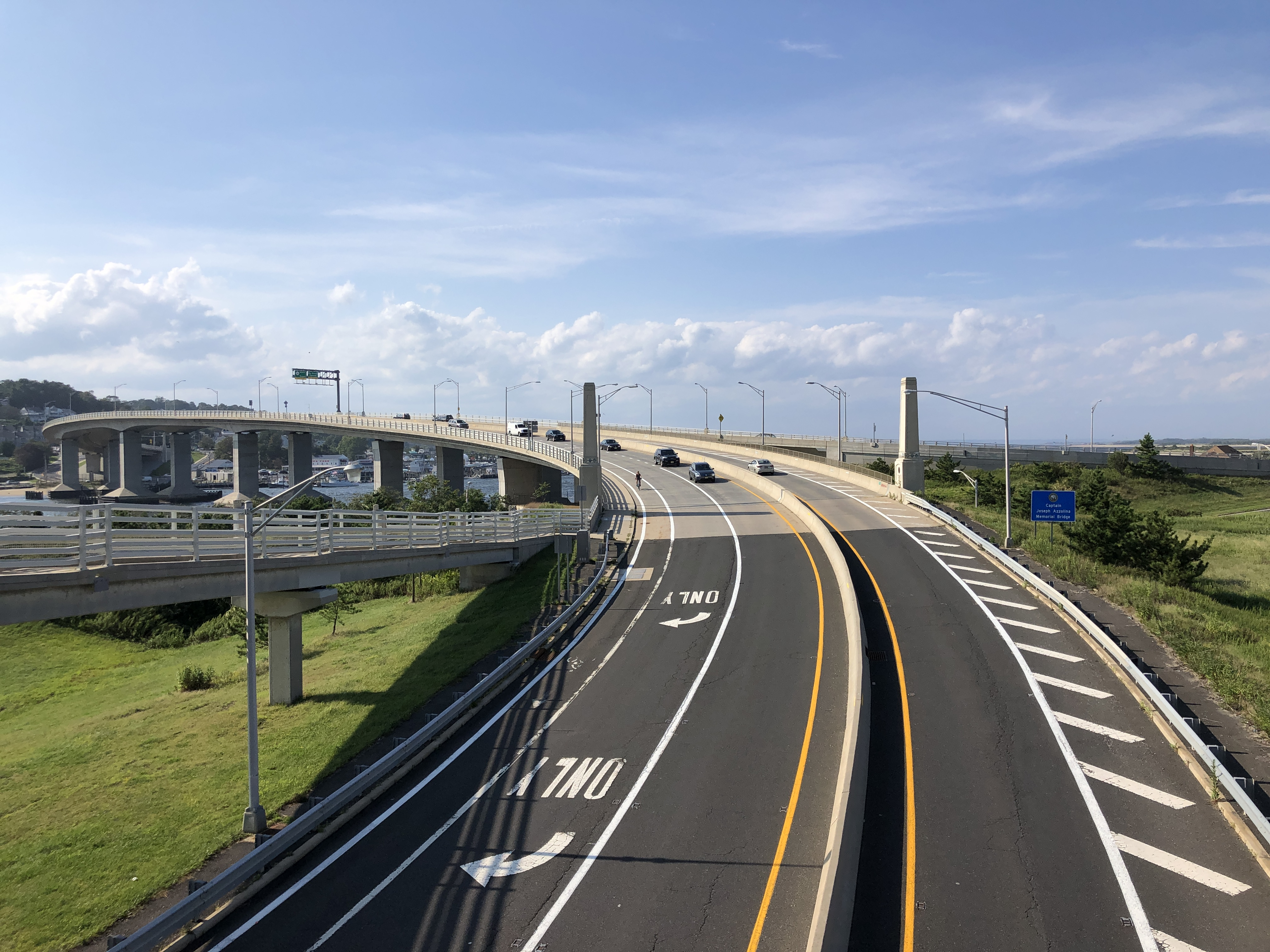
- The Highlands–Sea Bright Bridge in September 2021, facing northwest towards Highlands, New Jersey
- Coordinates: Map: 40°23′46″N 73°58′45″W
- Carries: 4 lanes of Route 36, pedestrians and bicycles
- Crosses: Shrewsbury River
- Locale: Highlands, New Jersey and Sandy Hook, New Jersey

History
- Opened: May 1, 2011 (current)

Location
- Interactive map of Highlands–Sea Bright Bridge

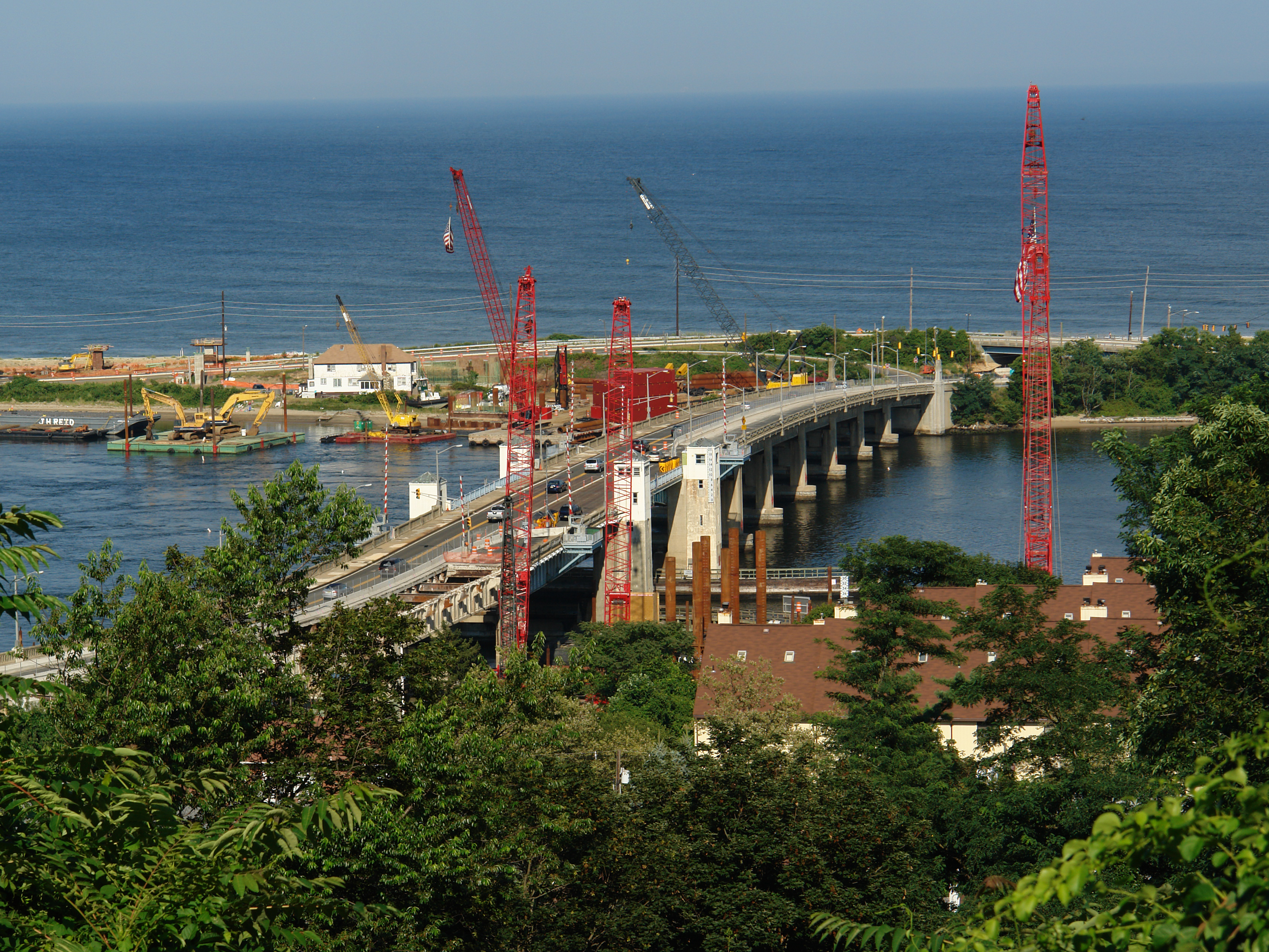
The Highlands-Sea Bright Bridge during demolition on July 24, 2008

The Highlands–Sea Bright Bridge is a bridge connecting Highlands, New Jersey in the west to Sea Bright, New Jersey in the east, across the Shrewsbury River. The eastern terminus is at the entrance to Sandy Hook. The span is part of Route 36.

== History ==
Several bridges have occupied the site. The first was a wooden beam bridge which lasted three years from 1872 to 1875. The second, a combination wood and steel swing bridge, was constructed in 1878 and lasted until demolition in 1949, though it was closed to traffic in 1933. The third bridge was a 1,240-foot bascule drawbridge, built in 1932 and opened the following year. When closed, it had a vertical clearance of 35 feet (11 m). In October 1991, the New Jersey Department of Transportation (NJDOT) recommended the replacement of the Highlands drawbridge with a 55-foot fixed-span bridge. According to an engineering study, replacement was believed to save $20 million over the cost-improvement actions outlined in a previous report that recommended extensive upgrades and partial replacement of bridge deck and superstructure. From August 1991 to 2002, several reports and studies by the NJDOT determined the general design and requirements for the replacement bridge. Of the many possible options one notable alternative was to build a second drawbridge and maintain both at the same time. By February 2002 the option of a 65-foot-tall (20 m) fixed-span bridge was approved, and by 2007 the design of the bridge was complete and the contract awarded to J.H. Reid General Contractor with a budget of $124 million.

Between 2008 and 2011, the new fixed-span bridge was constructed to replace the aging drawbridge, which was partially demolished on the southbound side as a result. The new bridge is 75 ft tall (23 m) and consists of two individual 1,610-foot-long spans (490 m) resting on nine hollow precast concrete columns. The spans are made of approximately 150 precast, post tensioned concrete box girders weighing between 30 and 70 tons each and achieve spans nearly twice the length of the steel spans of the original bridge. Because the new bridge was built in place of the old bridge, workers needed to demolish half of the old bridge and then construct half of the new bridge. After the first half of the new bridge was completed traffic was shifted to the new span, and the other half of the old bridge was demolished, making way for the second span of the new bridge. Construction of the new bridge began in February 2008 and was opened to traffic in December 2010. The entire project was completed in the spring of 2011. A ribbon-cutting ceremony occurred on May 1, 2011 to dedicate the newly constructed bridge. Several state and local officials attended the ceremony. The current bridges are narrower than the 1933 span, though due to carrying less traffic per direction, have wider shoulders.

In October 2012, the bridge became a life saver for the remaining residents of Sea Bright as the historic storm surge pushed ashore during Superstorm Sandy. It was reported that members of the Sea Bright Fire, Police and First Aids abandoned the town and stationed themselves on the highest remaining points in the area. The second bridge, the Rumson Bridge, which span the Shrewsbury River, was also utilized. After the storm passed, an estimated 90% of the town was said to be wiped out and uninhabitable.

Built	Bridge type	Construction material	Life span	Fate
1872	Beam bridge	Wood	3 years	Destroyed by vessel collision 1875
1878	Beam bridge, swing bridge	Wood/steel	71 years	Roadway removed 1933, fully demolished in 1949
1932	Beam bridge, bascule bridge	Concrete coated steel girders, concrete columns	76 years	Demolished from 2008 up until 2009
2011	Fixed cantilever bridge	Prestressed/post tensioned concrete	100 years (estimated)	First span completed in November 2009, second span in 2010, entire project completed in the spring of 2011
