= Monmouth Beach, New Jersey =

Borough in Monmouth County, New Jersey, US

- Borough
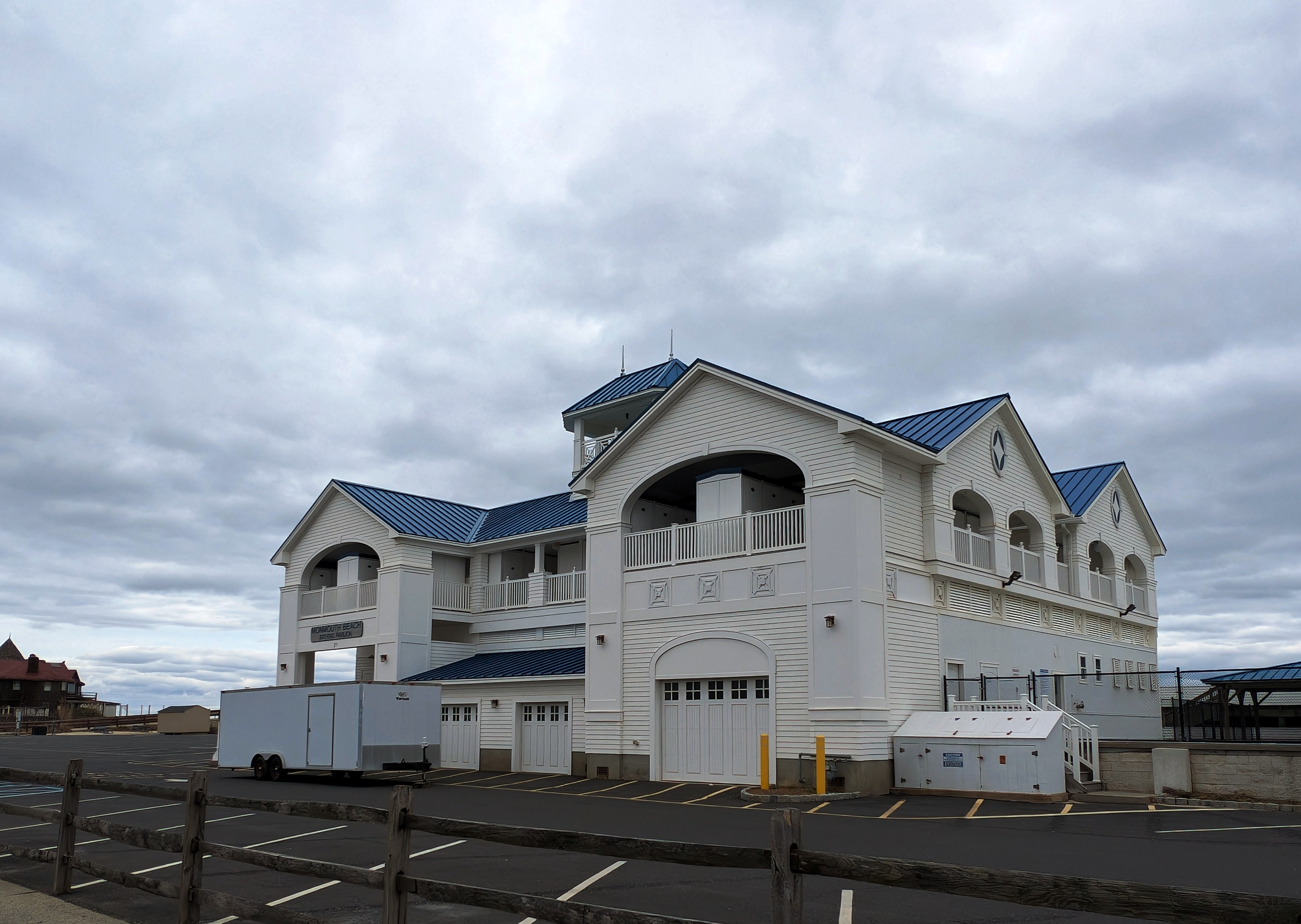
- Monmouth Beach Bathing Pavilion

- Seal

- Map of Monmouth Beach in Monmouth County. Inset: Location of Monmouth County highlighted in the State of New Jersey.

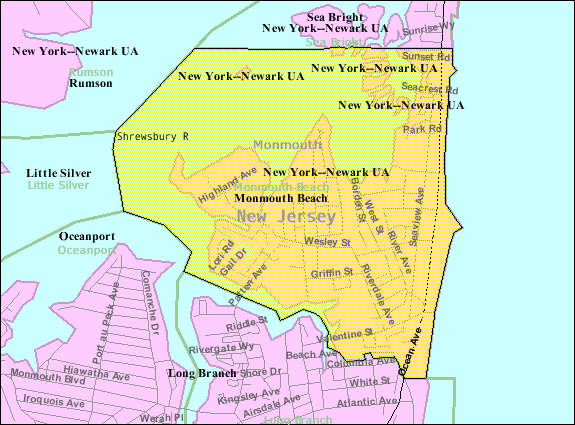
- Census Bureau map of Monmouth Beach, New Jersey

- Location in Monmouth County Location in New Jersey Location in the United States
- Coordinates: 40.335895°N 73.985608°W
- Country: United States
- State: New Jersey
- County: Monmouth
- Incorporated: March 9, 1906

Government
  - Type: Walsh Act
  - Body: Board of Commissioners
  - Mayor: David F. Stickle (term ends May 17, 2025)
  - Administrator: Anthony M. Villane
  - Municipal clerk: Joyce Escalante

Area
  - Total: 2.07 sq mi (5.37 km^{2})
  - Land: 1.04 sq mi (2.70 km^{2})
  - Water: 1.03 sq mi (2.67 km^{2}) 49.81%
  - Rank: 406th of 565 in state 30th of 53 in county
- Elevation: 20 ft (6.1 m)

Population (2020)
  - Total: 3,174
  - Estimate (2023): 3,204
  - Rank: 441st of 565 in state 39th of 53 in county
  - Density: 3,046.1/sq mi (1,176.1/km^{2})
  - Rank: 216th of 565 in state 24th of 53 in county
- Time zone: UTC−05:00 (Eastern (EST))
  - Summer (DST): UTC−04:00 (Eastern (EDT))
- ZIP Code: 07750
- Area code: 732
- FIPS code: 3402547130
- GNIS feature ID: 0885305
- Website: www.monmouthbeach.org

Monmouth Beach is a borough in Monmouth County, in the U.S. state of New Jersey, situated on the Jersey Shore in Central Jersey. As of the 2020 United States census, the borough's population was 3,174, a decrease of 105 (−3.2%) from the 2010 census count of 3,279, which in turn had reflected a decline of 316 (−8.8%) from the 3,595 counted at the 2000 census.

The area was first settled in 1668 and grew into a community with the arrival of the Long Branch and Sea Shore Railroad. Many early residents were professional fishermen with Norwegian backgrounds.

Monmouth Beach was incorporated from portions of Ocean Township as a borough on March 9, 1906, by an act of the New Jersey Legislature.

In 2023, the average home price according to Zillow was $974,409, which was up by 1.4% from the previous year.

In 2026, Congressman Frank Pallone announced that beach replenishment will take place in Monmouth County, that may include parts of Monmouth Beach, Sea Bright, and Long Branch in winter of 2026.

== Geography ==
According to the United States Census Bureau, the borough had a total area of 2.07 square miles (5.37 km^{2}), including 1.04 square miles (2.70 km^{2}) of land and 1.03 square miles (2.67 km^{2}) of water (49.81%).

The borough is a small beach community located on the Jersey Shore, known for its Victorian houses and the new multimillion-dollar homes located throughout the neighborhood. It was recently affected by Hurricane Sandy, damaging multiple homes. Monmouth Beach is one square mile, with the ocean to the east and the Shrewsbury River to the northwest.

Unincorporated communities, localities and place names located partially or completely within the borough include Galilee. The Sea Bright–Monmouth Beach Seawall parallel to the ocean.

The borough is bordered by the Monmouth County communities of Little Silver, Long Branch, Oceanport, Rumson and Sea Bright.

Within Monmouth Beach are two beach clubs. These are Monmouth Beach Bathing Pavilion, known to locals as "Little Monmouth", and Monmouth Beach Bath and Tennis Club, also known as "Big Monmouth". These spacious beach clubs equipped with pool and beach access. They have lockers, activities, swim teams, and more. Many locals and area residents attend these beach clubs.

Monmouth Beach offers fishing, as well as surfable waves. The Shrewsbury River, which borders the borough, offers sailing, kayaking, and fishing. The great majority of the borough of Monmouth Beach is residential. Places to go within the area include the many restaurants, lounges, and bars in West End, and Pier Village in Long Branch. Other notable locations include Red Bank, and the numerous beaches all along the shore towns to the north and south such as Asbury Park.

== Demographics ==
Historical population
Census	Pop.	Note	%±
1910	485		—
1920	410		−15.5%
1930	457		11.5%
1940	584		27.8%
1950	806		38.0%
1960	1,363		69.1%
1970	2,042		49.8%
1980	3,318		62.5%
1990	3,303		−0.5%
2000	3,595		8.8%
2010	3,279		−8.8%
2020	3,174		−3.2%
2023 (est.)	3,204	▲	0.9%
Population sources: 1910–1920 1910 1910–1930; 1940–2000 2000; 2010 2020

=== 2020 census ===
As of the 2020 census, Monmouth Beach had a population of 3,174. The median age was 54.3 years. 15.3% of residents were under the age of 18 and 28.3% of residents were 65 years of age or older. For every 100 females there were 90.2 males, and for every 100 females age 18 and over there were 88.7 males age 18 and over.

100.0% of residents lived in urban areas, while 0.0% lived in rural areas.

There were 1,452 households in Monmouth Beach, of which 18.9% had children under the age of 18 living in them. Of all households, 51.3% were married-couple households, 17.3% were households with a male householder and no spouse or partner present, and 27.6% were households with a female householder and no spouse or partner present. About 35.3% of all households were made up of individuals and 18.8% had someone living alone who was 65 years of age or older.

There were 2,006 housing units, of which 27.6% were vacant. The homeowner vacancy rate was 1.4% and the rental vacancy rate was 8.4%.

Racial composition as of the 2020 census
Race	Number	Percent
White	2,934	92.4%
Black or African American	9	0.3%
American Indian and Alaska Native	5	0.2%
Asian	37	1.2%
Native Hawaiian and Other Pacific Islander	0	0.0%
Some other race	44	1.4%
Two or more races	145	4.6%
Hispanic or Latino (of any race)	122	3.8%

=== 2010 census ===
The 2010 United States census counted 3,279 people, 1,494 households, and 855 families in the borough. The population density was 3,049.5 per square mile (1,177.4/km^{2}). There were 1,981 housing units at an average density of 1,842.4 per square mile (711.4/km^{2}). The racial makeup was 97.50% (3,197) White, 0.34% (11) Black or African American, 0.09% (3) Native American, 0.73% (24) Asian, 0.03% (1) Pacific Islander, 0.27% (9) from other races, and 1.04% (34) from two or more races. Hispanic or Latino of any race were 1.89% (62) of the population.

Of the 1,494 households, 21.7% had children under the age of 18; 48.9% were married couples living together; 5.8% had a female householder with no husband present and 42.8% were non-families. Of all households, 37.5% were made up of individuals and 15.8% had someone living alone who was 65 years of age or older. The average household size was 2.19 and the average family size was 2.96.

20.1% of the population were under the age of 18, 4.2% from 18 to 24, 18.6% from 25 to 44, 35.5% from 45 to 64, and 21.5% who were 65 years of age or older. The median age was 48.7 years. For every 100 females, the population had 89.9 males. For every 100 females ages 18 and older there were 86.9 males.

The Census Bureau's 2006–2010 American Community Survey showed that (in 2010 inflation-adjusted dollars) median household income was $94,583 (with a margin of error of +/− $29,606) and the median family income was $129,886 (+/− $7,489). Males had a median income of $108,369 (+/− $6,617) versus $76,813 (+/− $5,948) for females. The per capita income for the borough was $61,385 (+/− $8,902). About 2.1% of families and 2.7% of the population were below the poverty line, including 3.8% of those under age 18 and 3.0% of those age 65 or over.

=== 2000 census ===
As of the 2000 United States census there were 3,595 people, 1,633 households, and 976 families residing in the borough. The population density was 1, 297.2/km^{2} (3,354.4/sq mi). There were 1,969 housing units at an average density of 1,837.2 per square mile (709.3/km^{2}). The racial makeup of the borough was 97.66% White, 0.53% African American, 0.86% Asian, 0.33% from other races, and 0.61% from two or more races. Hispanic or Latino of any race were 1.89% of the population.

There were 1,633 households, out of which 23.3% had children under the age of 18 living with them, 49.7% were married couples living together, 7.5% had a female householder with no husband present, and 40.2% were non-families. 35.2% of all households were made up of individuals, and 13.5% had someone living alone who was 65 years of age or older. The average household size was 2.20 and the average family size was 2.89.

In the borough the population was spread out, with 20.3% under the age of 18, 3.5% from 18 to 24, 27.0% from 25 to 44, 28.9% from 45 to 64, and 20.4% who were 65 years of age or older. The median age was 45 years. For every 100 females, there were 88.1 males. For every 100 females age 18 and over, there were 84.8 males.

The median income for a household in the borough was $80,484, and the median income for a family was $93,401. Males had a median income of $65,060 versus $45,208 for females. The per capita income for the borough was $52,862. About 1.4% of families and 1.9% of the population were below the poverty line, including 2.4% of those under age 18 and 2.3% of those age 65 or over.

== Government ==
=== Local government ===
The Borough of Monmouth Beach has been governed under the Walsh Act, by a three-member commission, since 1929. The borough is one of 30 municipalities (of the 564) statewide that use the commission form of government. The governing body is comprised of a three-member commission, whose members are elected at-large in non-partisan elections to serve four-year terms of office on a concurrent basis in elections held every four years as part of the May municipal election.

As of 2023, members of the Borough Commission are Mayor David F. Stickle (Commissioner of Public Affairs and Public Safety), Lawrence M. Bolsch (Commissioner of Revenue and Finance) and Timothy Somers (Commissioner of Public Works, Parks and Public Property), whose terms of office end concurrently as of May 13, 2025.

=== Federal, state and county representation ===
Monmouth Beach is located in the 6th Congressional District and is part of New Jersey's 13th state legislative district.

For the 119th United States Congress, New Jersey's 6th congressional district is represented by Frank Pallone (D, Long Branch). New Jersey is represented in the United States Senate by Democrats Cory Booker (Newark, term ends 2027) and Andy Kim (Moorestown, term ends 2031).

For the 2026–2027 session, the 13th legislative district of the New Jersey Legislature is represented in the New Jersey Senate by Declan O'Scanlon (R, Little Silver) and in the General Assembly by Vicky Flynn (R, Holmdel Township) and Gerard Scharfenberger (R, Middletown Township).

Monmouth County is governed by a Board of County Commissioners composed of five members who are elected at-large to serve three-year terms of office on a staggered basis, with either one or two seats up for election each year as part of the November general election. At an annual reorganization meeting held in the beginning of January, the board selects one of its members to serve as director and another as deputy director.

As of 2025, Monmouth County's Commissioners are Director Thomas A. Arnone (R, Neptune City, 2025), Susan M. Kiley (R, Hazlet Township, 2027), Erik Anderson (R, Shrewsbury, 2026), Nick DiRocco (R, Wall Township, 2025), and Deputy Director Ross F. Licitra (R, Marlboro Township, 2026).

Constitutional officers elected on a countywide basis are Clerk Christine Giordano Hanlon (R, 2025; Ocean Township), Sheriff Shaun Golden (R, 2025; Howell Township) and Surrogate Rosemarie D. Peters (R, 2026; Middletown Township).

=== Politics ===
United States presidential election results for Monmouth Beach
Year	Republican		Democratic		Third party(ies)	
Year	No.	%	No.	%	No.	%
2024	1,259	56.46%	937	42.02%	34	1.52%
2020	1,357	56.59%	1,024	42.70%	17	0.71%
2016	1,163	59.52%	754	38.59%	37	1.89%
2012	1,132	62.54%	662	36.57%	16	0.88%
2008	1,196	58.14%	837	40.69%	24	1.17%
2004	1,270	60.30%	817	38.79%	19	0.90%
2000	1,070	52.97%	873	43.22%	77	3.81%
1996	868	49.54%	734	41.89%	150	8.56%
1992	953	49.71%	677	35.32%	287	14.97%

As of March 2011, there were a total of 2,550 registered voters in Monmouth Beach, of which 605 (23.7%) were registered as Democrats, 742 (29.1%) were registered as Republicans and 1,200 (47.1%) were registered as Unaffiliated. There were 3 voters registered as Libertarians or Greens.

In the 2012 presidential election, Republican Mitt Romney received 62.5% of the vote (1,132 cast), ahead of Democrat Barack Obama with 36.6% (662 votes), and other candidates with 0.9% (16 votes), among the 1,826 ballots cast by the borough's 2,620 registered voters (16 ballots were spoiled), for a turnout of 69.7%. In the 2008 presidential election, Republican John McCain received 57.3% of the vote (1,196 cast), ahead of Democrat Barack Obama with 40.1% (837 votes) and other candidates with 1.2% (24 votes), among the 2,086 ballots cast by the borough's 2,725 registered voters, for a turnout of 76.6%. In the 2004 presidential election, Republican George W. Bush received 60.3% of the vote (1,270 ballots cast), outpolling Democrat John Kerry with 38.8% (817 votes) and other candidates with 0.7% (19 votes), among the 2,107 ballots cast by the borough's 2,813 registered voters, for a turnout percentage of 74.9.

Gubernatorial election results for Monmouth Beach
Year	Republican		Democratic		Third party(ies)	
Year	No.	%	No.	%	No.	%
2025	1,080	58.54%	754	40.87%	11	0.60%
2021	1,089	64.48%	594	35.17%	6	0.36%
2017	921	70.52%	372	28.48%	13	1.00%
2013	917	78.71%	235	20.17%	13	1.12%
2009	1,015	65.44%	443	28.56%	93	6.00%
2005	837	56.82%	583	39.58%	53	3.60%

In the 2013 gubernatorial election, Republican Chris Christie received 78.7% of the vote (917 cast), ahead of Democrat Barbara Buono with 20.2% (235 votes), and other candidates with 1.1% (13 votes), among the 1,181 ballots cast by the borough's 2,557 registered voters (16 ballots were spoiled), for a turnout of 46.2%. In the 2009 gubernatorial election, Republican Chris Christie received 65.1% of the vote (1,015 ballots cast), ahead of Democrat Jon Corzine with 28.4% (443 votes), Independent Chris Daggett with 5.5% (86 votes) and other candidates with 0.4% (7 votes), among the 1,559 ballots cast by the borough's 2,621 registered voters, yielding a 59.5% turnout.

United States Senate election results for Monmouth Beach1
Year	Republican		Democratic		Third party(ies)	
Year	No.	%	No.	%	No.	%
2024	1,254	58.19%	879	40.79%	22	1.02%
2018	987	60.93%	602	37.16%	31	1.91%
2012	1,146	66.09%	566	32.64%	22	1.27%
2006	804	58.47%	549	39.93%	22	1.60%

United States Senate election results for Monmouth Beach2
Year	Republican		Democratic		Third party(ies)	
Year	No.	%	No.	%	No.	%
2020	1,411	58.91%	949	39.62%	35	1.46%
2014	617	62.32%	358	36.16%	15	1.52%
2013	467	61.77%	282	37.30%	7	0.93%
2008	1,132	58.96%	748	38.96%	40	2.08%

== Education ==
Public school students in pre-kindergarten through eighth grade are served by the Monmouth Beach School District at Monmouth Beach School. As of the 2018–19 school year, the district, comprised of one school, had an enrollment of 236 students and 26.5 classroom teachers (on an FTE basis), for a student–teacher ratio of 8.9:1. Karen Ginty, a kindergarten teacher at Monmouth Beach Elementary School for 33 years, was named the 2006–2007 New Jersey State Teacher of the Year.

Public school students in ninth through twelfth grades attend Shore Regional High School, a regional high school that also serves students from the constituent districts of Oceanport, Sea Bright and West Long Branch. The high school is located in West Long Branch and is part of the Shore Regional High School District. As of the 2018–19 school year, the high school had an enrollment of 649 students and 57.2 classroom teachers (on an FTE basis), for a student–teacher ratio of 11.3:1. Seats on the high school district's nine-member board of education are allocated based on the population of the constituent municipalities, with one seat assigned to Monmouth Beach.

Public school students from Monmouth Beach, and all of Monmouth County, are eligible to apply to attend the schools of the Monmouth County Vocational School District.

== Transportation ==
=== Roads and highways ===
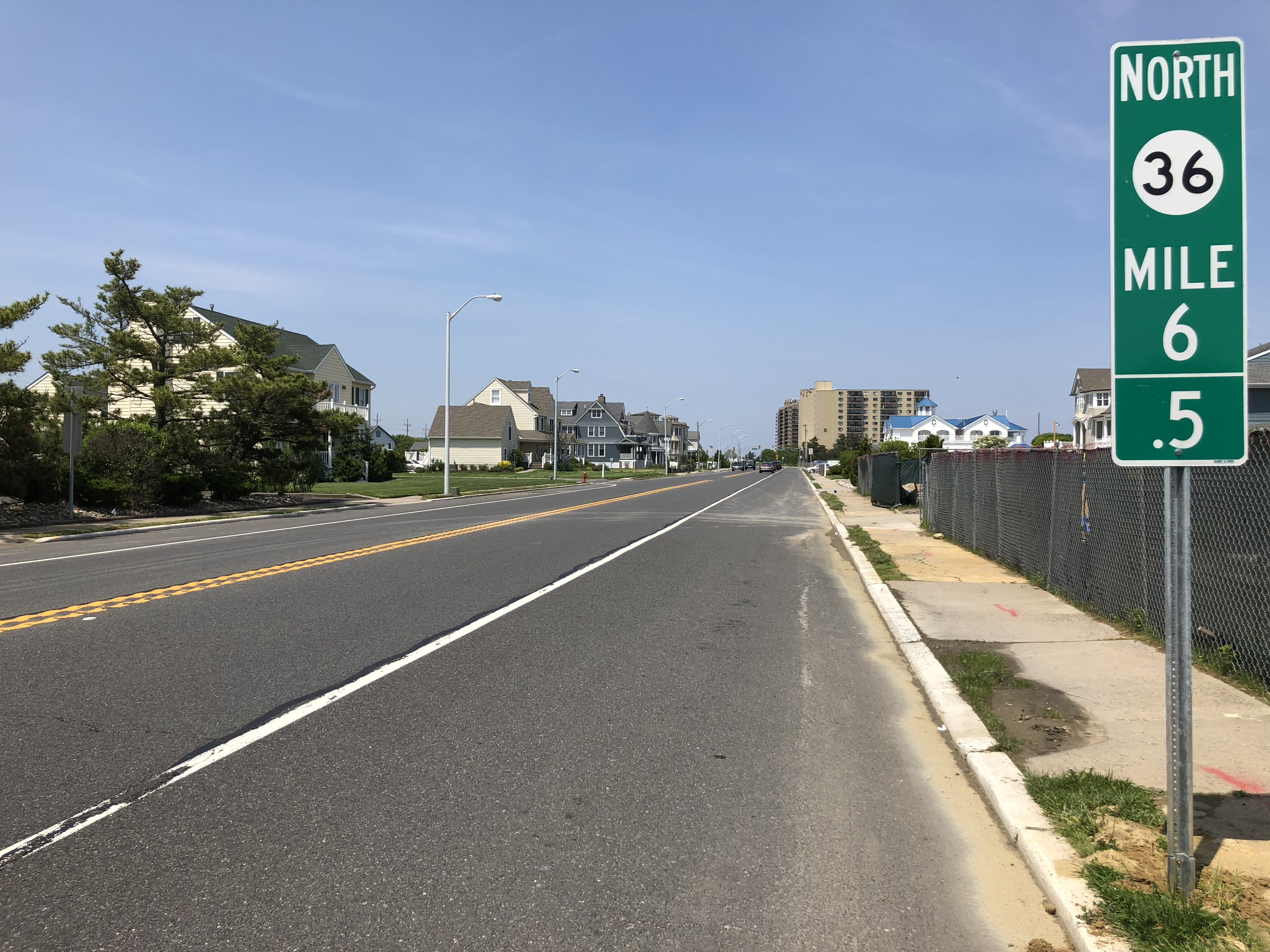
Route 36 (Ocean Avenue) in Monmouth Beach

As of May 2010, the borough had a total of 15.76 miles (25.36 km) of roadways, of which 14.12 miles (22.72 km) were maintained by the municipality and 1.64 miles (2.64 km) by the New Jersey Department of Transportation.

Route 36 (Ocean Avenue) is the main highway serving Monmouth Beach. Route 36 connects the borough to Long Branch on the south and Sea Bright to the north.

=== Public transportation ===
The SeaStreak ferry route to Wall Street and the East Side of Manhattan in New York City is a 10–15 minute drive to Atlantic Highlands / Highlands.

== Climate ==
According to the Köppen climate classification system, Monmouth Beach has a humid subtropical climate (Cfa). Cfa climates are characterized by all months having an average temperature above 32.0 °F (0.0 °C), at least four months with an average temperature at or above 50.0 °F (10.0 °C), at least one month with an average temperature at or above 71.6 °F (22.0 °C) and no significant precipitation difference between seasons. Although most summer days are slightly humid with a cooling afternoon sea breeze in Monmouth Beach, episodes of heat and high humidity can occur with heat index values above 104 °F (40 °C). Since 1981, the highest air temperature was 100.2 °F (37.9 °C) on August 9, 2001, and the highest daily average mean dew point was 77.9 °F (25.5 °C) on July 19, 2019. The average wettest month is July which correlates with the peak in thunderstorm activity. Since 1981, the wettest calendar day was 5.62 inches (143 mm) on August 27, 2011. During the winter months, the average annual extreme minimum air temperature is 4.4 °F (−15.3 °C). Since 1981, the coldest air temperature was −4.5 °F (−20.3 °C) on January 22, 1984. Episodes of extreme cold and wind can occur with wind chill values below −5 °F (−21 °C). The average seasonal (November–April) snowfall total is 18 to 24 inches (46 to 61 cm), and the average snowiest month is February which corresponds with the annual peak in nor'easter activity.

Climate data for Monmouth Beach, 1981–2010 normals, extremes 1981–2019
Month	Jan	Feb	Mar	Apr	May	Jun	Jul	Aug	Sep	Oct	Nov	Dec	Year
Record high °F (°C)	70.8 (21.6)	78.8 (26.0)	82.3 (27.9)	88.2 (31.2)	94.9 (34.9)	96.4 (35.8)	99.9 (37.7)	100.2 (37.9)	97.1 (36.2)	93.1 (33.9)	78.9 (26.1)	74.7 (23.7)	100.2 (37.9)
Mean daily maximum °F (°C)	39.7 (4.3)	42.3 (5.7)	48.9 (9.4)	58.6 (14.8)	68.2 (20.1)	77.6 (25.3)	82.8 (28.2)	81.7 (27.6)	75.5 (24.2)	64.8 (18.2)	54.9 (12.7)	44.8 (7.1)	61.7 (16.5)
Daily mean °F (°C)	32.5 (0.3)	34.8 (1.6)	41.0 (5.0)	50.4 (10.2)	60.1 (15.6)	69.6 (20.9)	75.2 (24.0)	74.2 (23.4)	67.8 (19.9)	56.7 (13.7)	47.6 (8.7)	37.9 (3.3)	54.1 (12.3)
Mean daily minimum °F (°C)	25.4 (−3.7)	27.3 (−2.6)	33.0 (0.6)	42.3 (5.7)	52.0 (11.1)	61.7 (16.5)	67.5 (19.7)	66.8 (19.3)	60.0 (15.6)	48.5 (9.2)	40.2 (4.6)	31.0 (−0.6)	46.4 (8.0)
Record low °F (°C)	−4.5 (−20.3)	1.7 (−16.8)	6.5 (−14.2)	18.4 (−7.6)	36.7 (2.6)	45.3 (7.4)	48.7 (9.3)	46.4 (8.0)	39.5 (4.2)	27.1 (−2.7)	16.2 (−8.8)	−0.5 (−18.1)	−4.5 (−20.3)
Average precipitation inches (mm)	3.56 (90)	2.96 (75)	3.84 (98)	4.17 (106)	3.90 (99)	3.66 (93)	4.67 (119)	4.63 (118)	3.65 (93)	3.95 (100)	3.73 (95)	3.96 (101)	46.68 (1,186)
Average relative humidity (%)	65.4	62.0	61.1	62.6	66.2	70.5	69.9	71.0	71.6	69.4	67.6	65.6	66.9
Average dew point °F (°C)	22.2 (−5.4)	23.1 (−4.9)	28.6 (−1.9)	38.1 (3.4)	48.8 (9.3)	59.6 (15.3)	64.7 (18.2)	64.2 (17.9)	58.3 (14.6)	46.8 (8.2)	37.4 (3.0)	27.4 (−2.6)	43.4 (6.3)
Source: PRISM

Climate data for Sandy Hook Buoy, 10 N Monmouth Beach, NJ (Ocean Water Temperature)
Month	Jan	Feb	Mar	Apr	May	Jun	Jul	Aug	Sep	Oct	Nov	Dec	Year
Daily mean °F (°C)	37 (3)	36 (2)	40 (4)	46 (8)	55 (13)	62 (17)	69 (21)	72 (22)	68 (20)	59 (15)	51 (11)	43 (6)	53 (12)
Source: NOAA

== Ecology ==
According to the A. W. Kuchler U.S. potential natural vegetation types, Monmouth Beach would have a dominant vegetation type of Appalachian Oak (104) with a dominant vegetation form of Eastern Hardwood Forest (25). The plant hardiness zone is 7a with an average annual extreme minimum air temperature of 4.4 °F (−15.3 °C). The average date of first spring leaf-out is March 24 and fall color typically peaks in early-November.

== Notable people ==
People who were born in, residents of, or otherwise closely associated with Monmouth Beach include:

- William Warren Barbour (1888–1943), represented New Jersey in the United States Senate from 1931 to 1937
- Warren A. Croll Jr. (1920-2008), retired Hall of Fame Thoroughbred race horse trainer
- William Fargo (1818–1881), founder of Wells Fargo
- John Farrell (born 1962), former MLB baseball player and pitching coach; former manager of the Boston Red Sox
- Jim Garrett (1930–2018), NFL football player and coach
- Kim Guadagno (born 1959), former Monmouth Beach commissioner, elected sheriff of Monmouth County, New Jersey and first Lieutenant Governor of New Jersey
- Jay Gould (1836–1892), railroad magnate and financial speculator, often described as a robber baron
- I. Kathleen Hagen (born 1945), physician who gained notoriety for being accused of murder by asphyxia of her parents
- Garret Hobart (1844–1899), United States vice president
- Philip B. Hofmann (1909–1986), businessman who was the first non-family-member to serve as chairman and chief executive officer of Johnson & Johnson
- Frederick K. Humphreys (1816–1900), physician and the founder of Humphreys Homeopathic Medicine Company
- Guglielmo Marconi (1874–1937), wireless radio pioneer
- Malcolm McKesson (1909–1999), outsider artist known for his ballpoint pen drawings and his erotic fiction
- Priscilla Ransohoff (1912–1992), military education specialist and advocate for women in science and federal employment.
- Brian Wenning (born 1981), professional skateboarder

Preceded by Sea Bright	Beaches of New Jersey	Succeeded by Long Branch
