= Brian Wenning =

American skateboarder

Brian Wenning is a former professional skateboarder formerly affiliated with Plan B Skateboards, Habitat Skateboards, and DC Shoes. He has appeared on ESPN.com and in several skating magazines.

== Filmography ==
- Zoo York: Heads (1999)
- Transworld: Feedback (1999)
- Transworld: The Reason (1999)
- Baker: Baker 2G (2000)
- Logic: Issue 05 (2000)
- Logic: Issue 06 (2000)
- Zoo York: EST Premier Issue (2000)
- Alien Workshop: Photosynthesis (2000)
- 411VM: Around The World (2002)
- Habitat: Mosaic (2003)
- Transworld: Subtleties (2004)
- DC: The DC Video (2004)
- Plan B: Live After Death (2006)
- DC: Australia Tour (2006)
- DC: King of New York (2007)
- DC: King of Los Angeles (2007)
- DC: King of Barcelona (2007)
- Plan B: Superfuture (2008)
