= Sea Bright, New Jersey =

Borough in Monmouth County, New Jersey, US

- Borough
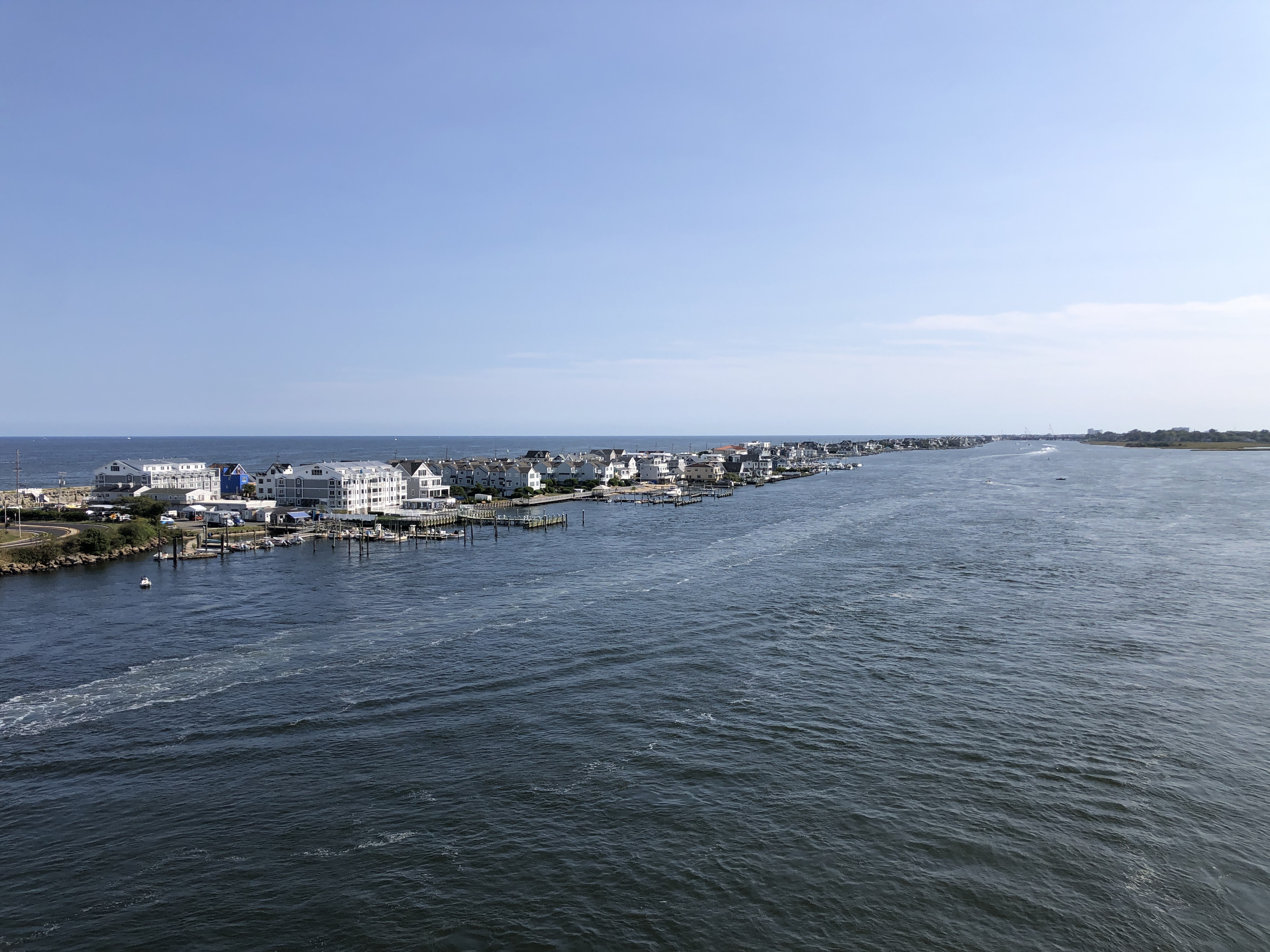
- View of Sea Bright from the Highlands–Sea Bright Bridge, with the Shrewsbury River in the foreground and the Atlantic Ocean in the background (2024)

- Seal

- Map of Sea Bright in Monmouth County. Inset: Location of Monmouth County highlighted in the State of New Jersey.

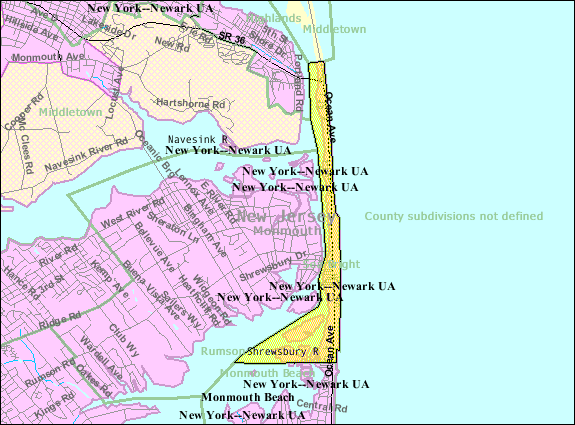
- Census Bureau map of Sea Bright, New Jersey

- Location in Monmouth County Location in New Jersey Location in the United States
- Coordinates: 40°21′41″N 73°58′27″W
- Country: United States
- State: New Jersey
- County: Monmouth
- Incorporated: March 21, 1889

Government
  - Type: Borough
  - Body: Borough Council
  - Mayor: Brian P. Kelly (R, term ends December 31, 2027)
  - Administrator: Rachel Giolitto
  - Municipal clerk: Christine Pfeiffer

Area
  - Total: 1.29 sq mi (3.33 km^{2})
  - Land: 0.72 sq mi (1.86 km^{2})
  - Water: 0.57 sq mi (1.47 km^{2}) 43.88%
  - Rank: 472nd of 565 in state 42nd of 53 in county
- Elevation: 3 ft (0.91 m)

Population (2020)
  - Total: 1,449
  - Estimate (2023): 1,425
  - Rank: 513th of 565 in state 47th of 53 in county
  - Density: 2,013.1/sq mi (777.3/km^{2})
  - Rank: 296th of 565 in state 35th of 53 in county
- Time zone: UTC−05:00 (Eastern (EST))
  - Summer (DST): UTC−04:00 (Eastern (EDT))
- ZIP Code: 07760
- Area code: 732
- FIPS code: 3402566240
- GNIS feature ID: 0885387
- Website: www.seabrightnj.org

Sea Bright is a borough located on the Jersey Shore, within Monmouth County, in the U.S. state of New Jersey. As of the 2020 United States census, the borough's population was 1,449, an increase of 37 (+2.6%) from the 2010 census count of 1,412, which in turn had resulted to a decline of 406 (−22.3%) from the 1,818 counted in the 2000 census.

Sea Bright was formed as a borough by an act of the New Jersey Legislature on March 21,1889, from portions of Ocean Township, based on the results of a referendum held the previous day. The borough was incorporated again on March 10, 1897. Additional portions of Ocean Township were annexed by the borough in March, 1909.

Some sources attribute the name to a suggestion made by Martha Bayard Stevens, The borough and other sources say that it was named for Sea Bright, England, though there is no evidence such a place exists. Earlier sources often spell it as one word, "Seabright", as seen in the United States Coast Guard's Station Seabright and the Seabright Lawn Tennis and Cricket Club.

In 2026, Congressman Frank Pallone announced that beach replenishment will take place in Monmouth County, that may include parts of Sea Bright, Monmouth Beach, and Long Branch.

== History ==
In the early 1840s, the area of present-day Sea Bright was a fishing community of simple shacks near the beach dunes; Ocean House, the area's first hotel, opened in 1842, featuring access to fishing and sea bathing. The area was called "Nauvoo", a Native American word, meaning "bright sea". An alternative explanation, which the borough credits as the source, is that the name is derived from the Hebrew language meaning "pleasant place," which was the same name that Mormon leader Joseph Smith gave to Nauvoo, the Illinois town he founded in 1839. Smith is said to have visited Monmouth County during a missionary journey in 1840.

The first bridge across the Shrewsbury River connecting Sea Bright to Rumson was constructed in 1870. After several iterations of the bridge, Monmouth County had announced plans for a replacement of the existing span built in 1950 that connects to Ocean Avenue in Sea Bright with a new bridge, due to the structural deficiency and function obsolete state of the existing structure. They predicted that the project would be completed in 2020 at a site south of the current crossing. The current bridge, which is becoming harder to maintain over time, has been repaired twice in the 21st century, once in 2002 and again in 2013. The new bridge was completed on July 31, 2025. The new bridge includes two wide shoulders, something the original bridge lacked. It will also include other improvements, such as modernized draw controls, an access ramp to the nearby Sea Bright Beach from the Route 36 intersection, pedestrian beacons and striped crosswalks with the Ward Avenue intersection, and upgrades to the nearby Sea Bright park. Demolition of a nearby Dunkin' Donuts was deemed necessary in order to construct the replacement bridge.

The Sea Bright Skiff was developed on the Jersey Shore in the early 19th century for fishing offshore, by being launched through the surf and returned to shore.

== Geography ==
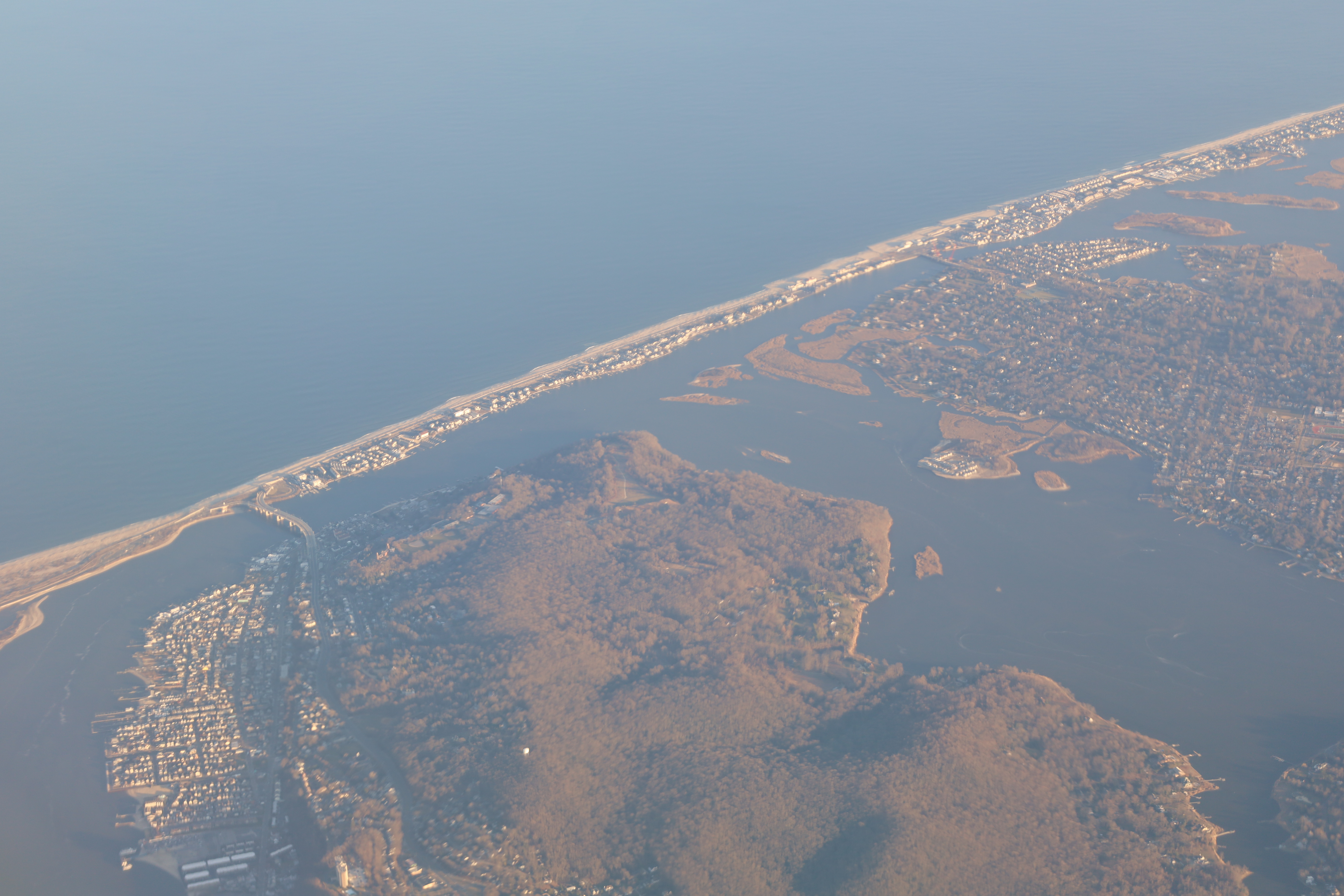
Aerial view in 2023

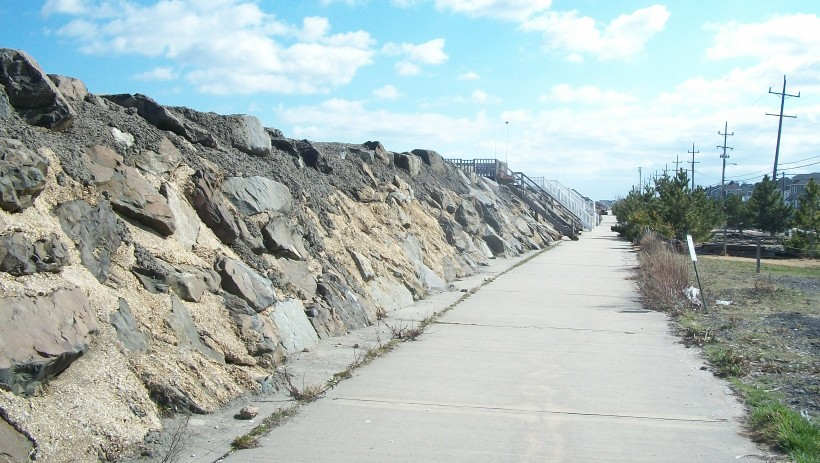
A Sea Bright–Monmouth Beach Seawall between the beach and Route 36 in Sea Bright

According to the United States Census Bureau, the borough had a total area of 1.29 square miles (3.33 km^{2}), including 0.72 square miles (1.86 km^{2}) of land and 0.57 square miles (1.47 km^{2}) of water (43.88%).

Sea Bright has seven members-only beach clubs, of which five are in the North Beach area: Ship Ahoy, Sands, Surfrider, Sea Bright Beach Club, and Chapel Beach Club; and two are south of the center of town: Driftwood and Edgewater. These clubs charge thousands of dollars for membership and have waiting lists of several years for prospective members. In addition, there is a large public, municipal beach in the center of town, protected by lifeguards, with entry limited to those who have purchased a beach badge. The traditional surfing beach area, called the Anchorage, is free and public, but unguarded. In addition, there are numerous public access stairs to other unguarded beaches for fishing, recreation and suntanning.

Unincorporated communities, localities and place names within Sea Bright include Low Moor, Navesink Beach and Normandie. Sea Bright–Monmouth Beach Seawall runs the length of the town.

The borough borders the Monmouth County municipalities of Highlands, Middletown Township, Monmouth Beach and Rumson. Sea Bright is located on the barrier peninsula that separates the Atlantic Ocean from the Navesink and Shrewsbury rivers.

== Demographics ==
Historical population
Census	Pop.	Note	%±
1900	1,198		—
1910	1,220		1.8%
1920	856		−29.8%
1930	899		5.0%
1940	779		−13.3%
1950	999		28.2%
1960	1,138		13.9%
1970	1,339		17.7%
1980	1,812		35.3%
1990	1,693		−6.6%
2000	1,818		7.4%
2010	1,412		−22.3%
2020	1,449		2.6%
2023 (est.)	1,425	▼	−1.7%
Population sources: 1900–1920; 1900–1910 1910–1930; 1940–2000 2000; 2010 2020

=== 2010 census ===
The 2010 United States census counted 1,412 people, 792 households, and 325 families in the borough. The population density was 1,935.5 per square mile (747.3/km^{2}). There were 1,211 housing units at an average density of 1,659.9 per square mile (640.9/km^{2}). The racial makeup was 94.55% (1,335) White, 0.78% (11) Black or African American, 0.00% (0) Native American, 2.27% (32) Asian, 0.00% (0) Pacific Islander, 1.49% (21) from other races, and 0.92% (13) from two or more races. Hispanic or Latino of any race were 5.52% (78) of the population.

Of the 792 households, 12.4% had children under the age of 18; 32.1% were married couples living together; 5.7% had a female householder with no husband present and 59.0% were non-families. Of all households, 48.7% were made up of individuals and 8.1% had someone living alone who was 65 years of age or older. The average household size was 1.78 and the average family size was 2.54.

11.3% of the population were under the age of 18, 5.2% from 18 to 24, 30.1% from 25 to 44, 38.8% from 45 to 64, and 14.5% who were 65 years of age or older. The median age was 46.7 years. For every 100 females, the population had 106.7 males. For every 100 females ages 18 and older there were 107.3 males.

The Census Bureau's 2006–2010 American Community Survey showed that (in 2010 inflation-adjusted dollars) median household income was $74,236 (with a margin of error of +/− $8,921) and the median family income was $102,679 (+/− $37,943). Males had a median income of $84,412 (+/− $45,724) versus $72,898 (+/− $10,443) for females. The per capita income for the borough was $82,535 (+/− $20,263). About 3.5% of families and 4.8% of the population were below the poverty line, including 6.3% of those under age 18 and 2.7% of those age 65 or over.

=== 2000 census ===
As of the 2000 United States census there were 1,818 people, 1,003 households, and 402 families residing in the borough. The population density was 2,846.9 inhabitants per square mile (1,099.2/km^{2}). There were 1,202 housing units at an average density of 1,882.3 per square mile (726.8/km^{2}). The racial makeup of the borough was 94.39% White, 1.76% African American, 2.26% Asian, 0.88% from other races, and 0.72% from two or more races. Hispanic or Latino of any race were 4.51% of the population.

There were 1,003 households, out of which 11.1% had children under the age of 18 living with them, 29.6% were married couples living together, 6.3% had a female householder with no husband present, and 59.9% were non-families. 45.4% of all households were made up of individuals, and 7.6% had someone living alone who was 65 years of age or older. The average household size was 1.81 and the average family size was 2.51.

In the borough the population was spread out, with 11.2% under the age of 18, 5.3% from 18 to 24, 41.5% from 25 to 44, 31.2% from 45 to 64, and 10.8% who were 65 years of age or older. The median age was 40 years. For every 100 females, there were 109.7 males. For every 100 females age 18 and over, there were 109.5 males.

The median income for a household in the borough was $65,563, and the median income for a family was $72,031. Males had a median income of $60,417 versus $41,100 for females. The per capita income for the borough was $45,066. About 5.3% of families and 7.6% of the population were below the poverty line, including 18.0% of those under age 18 and 3.7% of those age 65 or over.

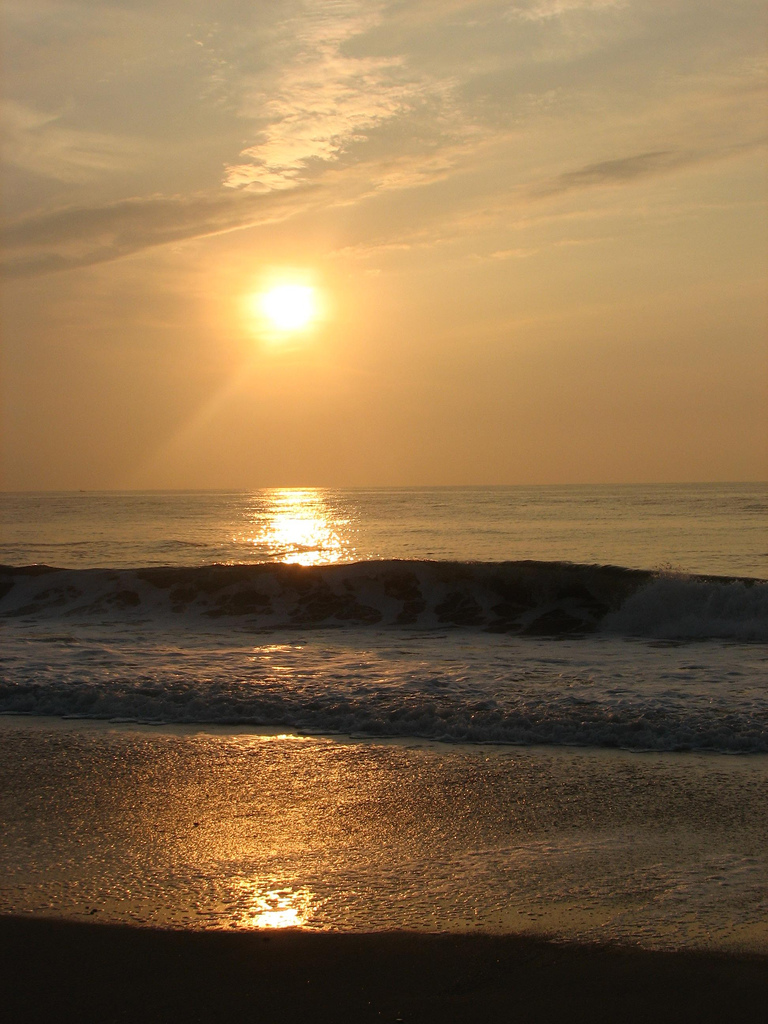
The Sea Bright beach on an early summer morning

== Parks and recreation ==
As of the summer of 2015, the borough added lifeguards and began charging visitors a daily admission at Anchorage Beach, an area that has been widely used by surfers, eliminating one of the few oceanfront beaches in the state accessible without a fee.

== Government ==
=== Local government ===
Sea Bright is governed under the borough form of New Jersey municipal government, which is used in 218 municipalities (of the 564) statewide, making it the most common form of government in New Jersey. The governing body is composed of the mayor and the borough council, with all positions elected at-large on a partisan basis as part of the November general election. A mayor is elected directly by the voters to a four-year term of office. The borough council includes six members elected to serve three-year terms on a staggered basis, with two seats coming up for election each year in a three-year cycle. The borough form of government used by Sea Bright is a "weak mayor / strong council" government in which council members act as the legislative body with the mayor presiding at meetings and voting only in the event of a tie. The mayor can veto ordinances subject to an override by a two-thirds majority vote of the council. The mayor makes committee and liaison assignments for council members, and most appointments are made by the mayor with the advice and consent of the council.

As of 2025, the mayor of Sea Bright is Republican Brian P. Kelly, whose second term of office ends December 31, 2027. Members of the Sea Bright Borough Council are Council President William J. "Jack" Keeler (R, 2027), Erwin W. Bieber (R, 2027), Marc A. Leckstein (D, 2026), Samuel A. Catalano (R, 2025), Heather Gorman (I, 2025) and John M. Lamia Jr. (R, 2026).

=== Federal, state and county representation ===
Sea Bright is located in the 6th Congressional District and is part of New Jersey's 13th state legislative district.

For the 119th United States Congress, New Jersey's 6th congressional district is represented by Frank Pallone (D, Long Branch). New Jersey is represented in the United States Senate by Democrats Cory Booker (Newark, term ends 2027) and Andy Kim (Moorestown, term ends 2031).

For the 2026–2027 session, the 13th legislative district of the New Jersey Legislature is represented in the New Jersey Senate by Declan O'Scanlon (R, Little Silver) and in the General Assembly by Vicky Flynn (R, Holmdel Township) and Gerard Scharfenberger (R, Middletown Township).

Monmouth County is governed by a Board of County Commissioners composed of five members who are elected at-large to serve three-year terms of office on a staggered basis, with either one or two seats up for election each year as part of the November general election. At an annual reorganization meeting held in the beginning of January, the board selects one of its members to serve as director and another as deputy director.

As of 2025, Monmouth County's Commissioners are Director Thomas A. Arnone (R, Neptune City, 2025), Susan M. Kiley (R, Hazlet Township, 2027), Erik Anderson (R, Shrewsbury, 2026), Nick DiRocco (R, Wall Township, 2025), and Deputy Director Ross F. Licitra (R, Marlboro Township, 2026).

Constitutional officers elected on a countywide basis are Clerk Christine Giordano Hanlon (R, 2025; Ocean Township), Sheriff Shaun Golden (R, 2025; Howell Township) and Surrogate Rosemarie D. Peters (R, 2026; Middletown Township).

=== Politics ===
United States presidential election results for Sea Bright
Year	Republican		Democratic		Third party(ies)	
Year	No.	%	No.	%	No.	%
2024	505	53.61%	431	45.75%	6	0.64%
2020	526	52.65%	458	45.85%	15	1.50%
2016	463	55.99%	326	39.42%	38	4.59%
2012	379	57.69%	270	41.10%	8	1.22%
2008	483	54.45%	389	43.86%	15	1.69%
2004	519	55.57%	399	42.72%	16	1.71%
2000	425	49.59%	374	43.64%	58	6.77%
1996	429	46.83%	407	44.43%	80	8.73%
1992	477	46.63%	317	30.99%	229	22.39%

As of March 2011, there were a total of 1,095 registered voters in Sea Bright, of which 248 (22.6%) were registered as Democrats, 305 (27.9%) were registered as Republicans and 541 (49.4%) were registered as Unaffiliated. There was one voter registered to another parties.

In the 2012 presidential election, Republican Mitt Romney received 57.7% of the vote (379 cast), ahead of Democrat Barack Obama with 41.1% (270 votes), and other candidates with 1.2% (8 votes), among the 659 ballots cast by the borough's 1,181 registered voters (2 ballots were spoiled), for a turnout of 55.8%. In the 2008 presidential election, Republican John McCain received 53.6% of the vote (483 cast), ahead of Democrat Barack Obama with 43.2% (389 votes) and other candidates with 1.7% (15 votes), among the 901 ballots cast by the borough's 1,220 registered voters, for a turnout of 73.9%. In the 2004 presidential election, Republican George W. Bush received 55.9% of the vote (519 ballots cast), outpolling Democrat John Kerry with 43.0% (399 votes) and other candidates with 1.2% (16 votes), among the 928 ballots cast by the borough's 1,282 registered voters, for a turnout percentage of 72.4.

Gubernatorial election results for Sea Bright
Year	Republican		Democratic		Third party(ies)	
Year	No.	%	No.	%	No.	%
2025	445	56.12%	347	43.76%	1	0.13%
2021	409	60.06%	267	39.21%	5	0.73%
2017	351	62.79%	191	34.17%	17	3.04%
2013	348	84.06%	61	14.73%	5	1.21%
2009	406	66.56%	164	26.89%	40	6.56%
2005	338	54.43%	257	41.38%	26	4.19%

In the 2013 gubernatorial election, Republican Chris Christie received 84.1% of the vote (348 cast), ahead of Democrat Barbara Buono with 14.7% (61 votes), and other candidates with 1.2% (5 votes), among the 418 ballots cast by the borough's 1,068 registered voters (4 ballots were spoiled), for a turnout of 39.1%. In the 2009 gubernatorial election, Republican Chris Christie received 66.2% of the vote (406 ballots cast), ahead of Democrat Jon Corzine with 26.8% (164 votes), Independent Chris Daggett with 5.5% (34 votes) and other candidates with 1.0% (6 votes), among the 613 ballots cast by the borough's 1,148 registered voters, yielding a 53.4% turnout.

United States Senate election results for Sea Bright1
Year	Republican		Democratic		Third party(ies)	
Year	No.	%	No.	%	No.	%
2024	490	53.67%	411	45.02%	12	1.31%
2018	396	58.32%	269	39.62%	14	2.06%
2012	395	62.11%	236	37.11%	5	0.79%
2006	336	57.83%	229	39.41%	16	2.75%

United States Senate election results for Sea Bright2
Year	Republican		Democratic		Third party(ies)	
Year	No.	%	No.	%	No.	%
2020	531	53.85%	436	44.22%	19	1.93%
2014	246	60.15%	153	37.41%	10	2.44%
2013	168	60.22%	105	37.63%	6	2.15%
2008	452	54.33%	365	43.87%	15	1.80%

== Education ==
Public school students in kindergarten through eighth grade are educated as part of the Oceanport School District after the former Sea Bright Board of Education was eliminated by the New Jersey Department of Education in 2009 as a non-operating district. As of the 2018–19 school year, the district, comprised of two schools, had an enrollment of 599 students and 61.0 classroom teachers (on an FTE basis), for a student–teacher ratio of 9.8:1. Schools in the district (with 2018–19 enrollment data from the National Center for Education Statistics) are Wolf Hill Elementary School with 342 students in pre-Kindergarten through 4th grade and Maple Place Middle School with 253 students in grades 5–8.

For ninth through twelfth grades, public school students attend Shore Regional High School, a regional high school that also serves students from the constituent districts of Monmouth Beach, Oceanport and West Long Branch. The high school is located in West Long Branch and is part of the Shore Regional High School District. As of the 2018–19 school year, the high school had an enrollment of 649 students and 57.2 classroom teachers (on an FTE basis), for a student–teacher ratio of 11.3:1. Seats on the high school district's nine-member board of education are allocated based on the population of the constituent municipalities, with one seat assigned to Sea Bright.

In 2024, a meeting between the Henry Hudson Regional School District, the Highlands School District, and the Atlantic Highlands School District boards of trustees, of which there are plans to consolidate into one district, stated that Sea Bright would have to re-establish its non-operating school district to join Henry Hudson; there is no provision in New Jersey law to permit this. The Oceanport School District and the Shore Regional High School district both filed legal challenges opposing Sea Bright's efforts to end their sending relationships and join the consolidated K-12 Henry Hudson District.

Sea Bright high school students in public school also have the opportunity to attend the schools of the Monmouth County Vocational School District, including the five career academies.

== Transportation ==
=== Roads and highways ===
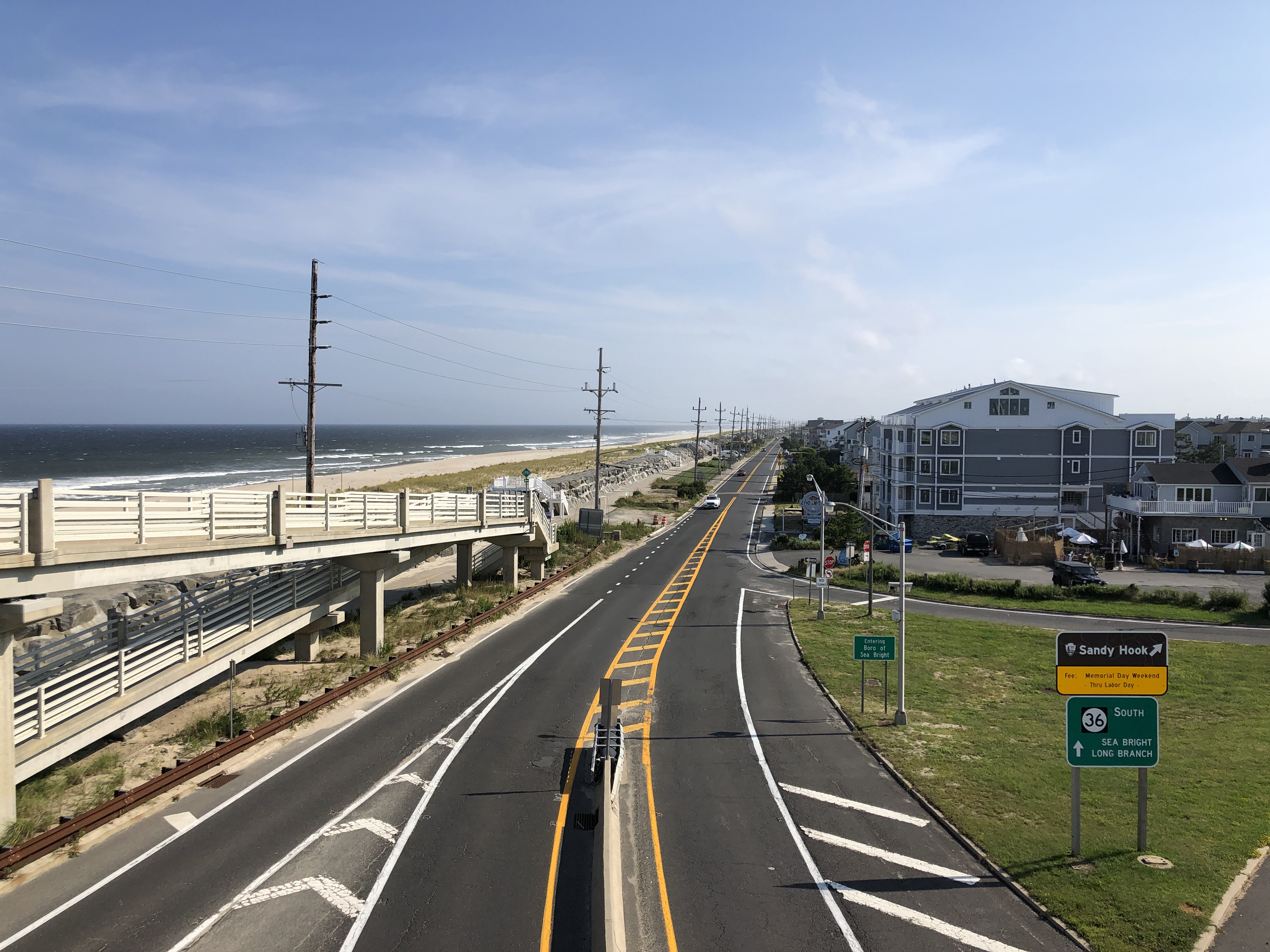
Route 36 South in Sea Bright

As of May 2010, the borough had a total of 6.37 miles (10.25 km) of roadways, of which 2.71 miles (4.36 km) were maintained by the municipality, 0.08 miles (0.13 km) by Monmouth County and 3.58 miles (5.76 km) by the New Jersey Department of Transportation.

Route 36 is the main highway through Sea Bright. To the south, it connects the borough to Monmouth Beach. Heading north, it crosses Shrewsbury River to Highlands across the Highlands–Sea Bright Bridge, a fixed span which was built between 2008 and 2011 to replace a 1,240-foot (380 m) drawbridge built in 1932. Sea Bright can also be accessed from Rumson to the west via Rumson Road (County Route 520) over the Rumson–Sea Bright Bridge.

=== Public transportation ===
NJ Transit provides local bus service between Sea Bright and Red Bank on the 838 route.

== Climate ==
According to the Köppen climate classification system, Sea Bright has a humid subtropical climate (Cfa). Cfa climates are characterized by all months having an average temperature above 32.0 °F (0.0 °C), at least four months with an average temperature at or above 50.0 °F (10.0 °C), at least one month with an average temperature at or above 71.6 °F (22.0 °C) and no significant precipitation difference between seasons. Although most summer days feature slight-to-moderate humidity and a cooling afternoon sea breeze in Sea Bright, episodes of heat and high humidity can occur with heat index values above 104 °F (40 °C). Since 1981, the highest air temperature was 99.8 °F (37.7 °C) on August 9, 2001, and the highest daily average mean dew point was 77.9 °F (25.5 °C) on July 19, 2019. The average wettest month is July which correlates with the peak in thunderstorm activity. Since 1981, the wettest calendar day was 5.63 inches (143 mm) on August 27, 2011. During the winter months, the average annual extreme minimum air temperature is 5.3 °F (−14.8 °C). Since 1981, the coldest air temperature was −3.6 °F (−19.8 °C) on January 21, 1985. Episodes of extreme cold and wind can occur with wind chill values below −5 °F (−21 °C). The average seasonal (November–April) snowfall total is 18 to 24 inches (46 to 61 cm) and the average snowiest month is February which corresponds with the annual peak in nor'easter activity.

Climate data for Sea Bright, 1981–2010 normals, extremes 1981–2019
Month	Jan	Feb	Mar	Apr	May	Jun	Jul	Aug	Sep	Oct	Nov	Dec	Year
Record high °F (°C)	70.4 (21.3)	77.9 (25.5)	82.0 (27.8)	89.0 (31.7)	94.6 (34.8)	96.0 (35.6)	99.6 (37.6)	99.8 (37.7)	96.6 (35.9)	92.6 (33.7)	78.1 (25.6)	74.4 (23.6)	99.8 (37.7)
Mean daily maximum °F (°C)	39.5 (4.2)	42.1 (5.6)	48.7 (9.3)	58.1 (14.5)	67.8 (19.9)	77.3 (25.2)	82.4 (28.0)	81.5 (27.5)	75.4 (24.1)	64.6 (18.1)	54.7 (12.6)	44.7 (7.1)	61.5 (16.4)
Daily mean °F (°C)	32.6 (0.3)	34.8 (1.6)	41.0 (5.0)	50.3 (10.2)	60.0 (15.6)	69.6 (20.9)	75.0 (23.9)	74.2 (23.4)	67.8 (19.9)	56.7 (13.7)	47.6 (8.7)	38.0 (3.3)	54.1 (12.3)
Mean daily minimum °F (°C)	25.6 (−3.6)	27.5 (−2.5)	33.2 (0.7)	42.4 (5.8)	52.1 (11.2)	61.8 (16.6)	67.6 (19.8)	66.9 (19.4)	60.2 (15.7)	48.8 (9.3)	40.4 (4.7)	31.2 (−0.4)	46.6 (8.1)
Record low °F (°C)	−3.6 (−19.8)	2.2 (−16.6)	7.7 (−13.5)	18.7 (−7.4)	38.8 (3.8)	46.6 (8.1)	50.6 (10.3)	47.3 (8.5)	41.0 (5.0)	29.2 (−1.6)	16.7 (−8.5)	0.1 (−17.7)	−3.6 (−19.8)
Average precipitation inches (mm)	3.51 (89)	2.86 (73)	3.82 (97)	4.13 (105)	3.85 (98)	3.76 (96)	4.65 (118)	4.43 (113)	3.64 (92)	3.88 (99)	3.66 (93)	3.91 (99)	46.10 (1,171)
Average relative humidity (%)	65.5	62.0	61.3	62.8	67.0	70.5	70.6	71.3	71.9	69.4	67.6	65.6	67.1
Average dew point °F (°C)	22.3 (−5.4)	23.1 (−4.9)	28.7 (−1.8)	38.1 (3.4)	49.0 (9.4)	59.6 (15.3)	64.8 (18.2)	64.3 (17.9)	58.4 (14.7)	46.8 (8.2)	37.4 (3.0)	27.5 (−2.5)	43.4 (6.3)
Source: PRISM

Climate data for Sandy Hook Buoy, 8 NW Sea Bright, NJ (Ocean Water Temperature)
Month	Jan	Feb	Mar	Apr	May	Jun	Jul	Aug	Sep	Oct	Nov	Dec	Year
Daily mean °F (°C)	37 (3)	36 (2)	40 (4)	46 (8)	55 (13)	62 (17)	69 (21)	72 (22)	68 (20)	59 (15)	51 (11)	43 (6)	53 (12)
Source: NOAA

== Ecology ==
According to the A. W. Kuchler U.S. potential natural vegetation types, Sea Bright would have a dominant vegetation type of Northern Cordgrass (73) with a dominant vegetation form of Coastal Prairie (20). The plant hardiness zone is 7b with an average annual extreme minimum air temperature of 5.3 °F (−14.8 °C). The average date of first spring leaf-out is March 23 and fall color typically peaks in early-November.

== Notable people ==
People who were born in, residents of, or otherwise closely associated with Sea Bright include:

- Fred Alexander (1880–1969), top-ranked tennis player in the early 20th century
- James Waddell Alexander II (1888–1971), mathematician and topologist who was one of the first members of the Institute for Advanced Study (1933–1951), and also a professor at Princeton University (1920–1951)
- Edward Shippen Barnes (1887–1958), organist, composer and author of the instructional organ method, The School Of Organ Playing (1921)
- Linda Chorney (born 1960), singer-songwriter and award-winning filmmaker
- Tal Farlow (1921–1998), jazz guitarist
- Lindley Miller Garrison (1864–1932), United States Secretary of War from 1913 to 1916 during the Administration of President Woodrow Wilson
- Jerry Gaskill (born 1957), rock musician who is the drummer for the progressive metal band King's X
- John J. McCook (1845–1911), Civil War officer, prominent New York attorney and railroad executive
- Mildred Mottahedeh (1908–2000), collector of ceramics, businessperson, and philanthropist who cofounded Mottahedeh & Company, a designer and supplier of luxury porcelain
- Melissa Stark (born 1973), television personality and sportscaster who works as a reporter for the NFL Network
- Martha Bayard Stevens (1831–1899), philanthropist influential in advancing complementary educational pursuits, who has been credited with suggesting the borough's name
- Juan Trippe (1899–1981), airline entrepreneur and founder of Pan Am
- Charles L. Walters (c. 1862–1894), politician who served for two years as mayor of Sea Bright and in the New Jersey General Assembly

North; Highlands	Beaches of New Jersey	South; Monmouth Beach
