= Shrewsbury River =

Estuary in New Jersey, United States

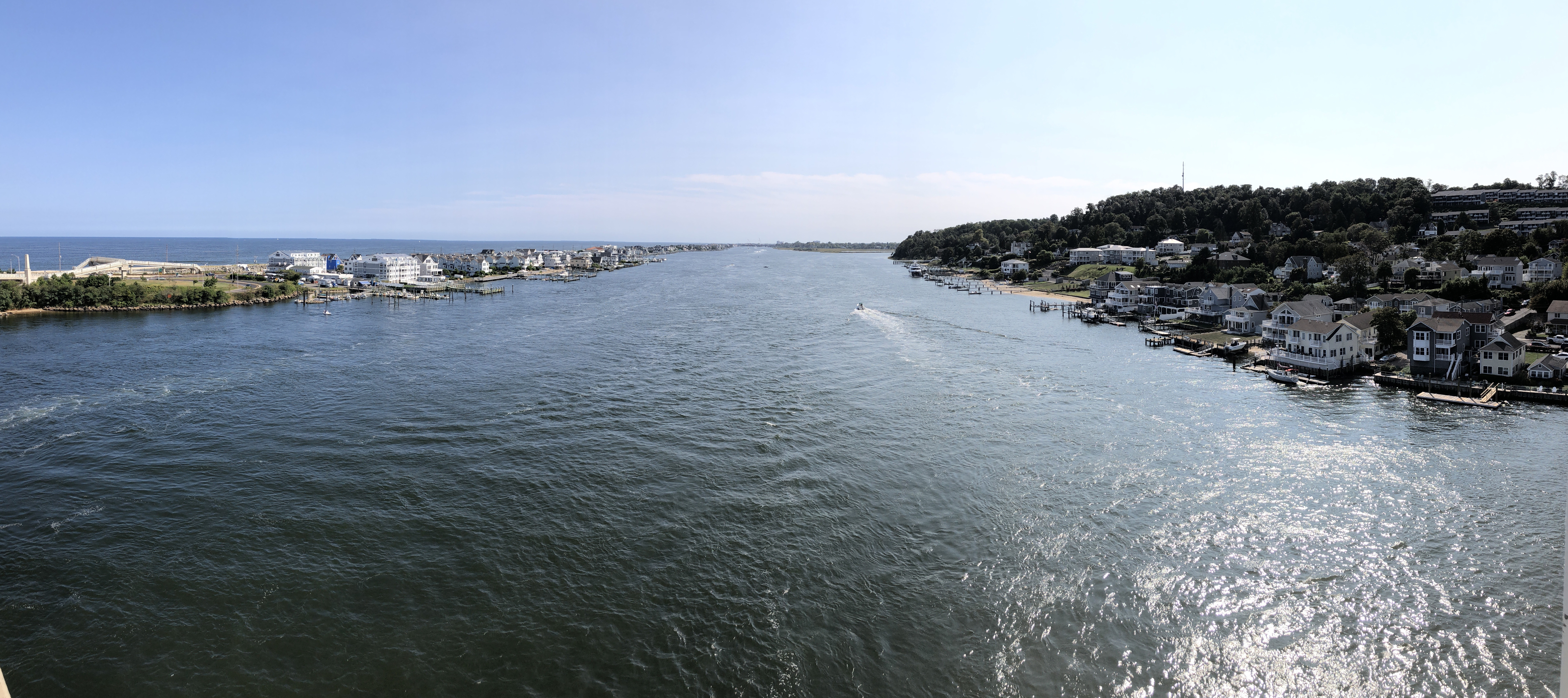
- View up (south) along the Shrewsbury River from the Highlands – Sea Bright Bridge, with Sea Bright on the left and Highlands on the right.

- Location within New Jersey
- Location: New Jersey
- Coordinates: 40.340741°N 74.002641°W
- Type: Estuary

The Shrewsbury River is a short stream and navigable estuary. The stream is approximately 8 mi (13 km) long and is located in Monmouth County in Central New Jersey.

It extends east-northeast from its head of navigation at Oceanport to its confluence with the Navesink River estuary, then entering 1 mi (1.6 km) north in a narrow channel to Sandy Hook Bay at Highlands. The south shore runs about the entire length of the northern border of Long Branch. The estuary is protected from the open Atlantic Ocean on its eastern side by a long barrier peninsula that extends north to become Sandy Hook. Jersey Shore resort communities on the peninsula include Monmouth Beach and Sea Bright. On the inner side of the estuary, the bedroom community of Rumson on the end of the peninsula, separating the Shrewsbury and Navesink estuaries, is among the wealthiest communities in the United States.

The estuary provides a popular marina for pleasure craft and recreational fishing. Marine species like Fluke (summer flounder), striped bass, bluefish and weakfish are popular fish targeted by local anglers. Many also participate in crabbing, or crab fishing.

== Tributaries ==
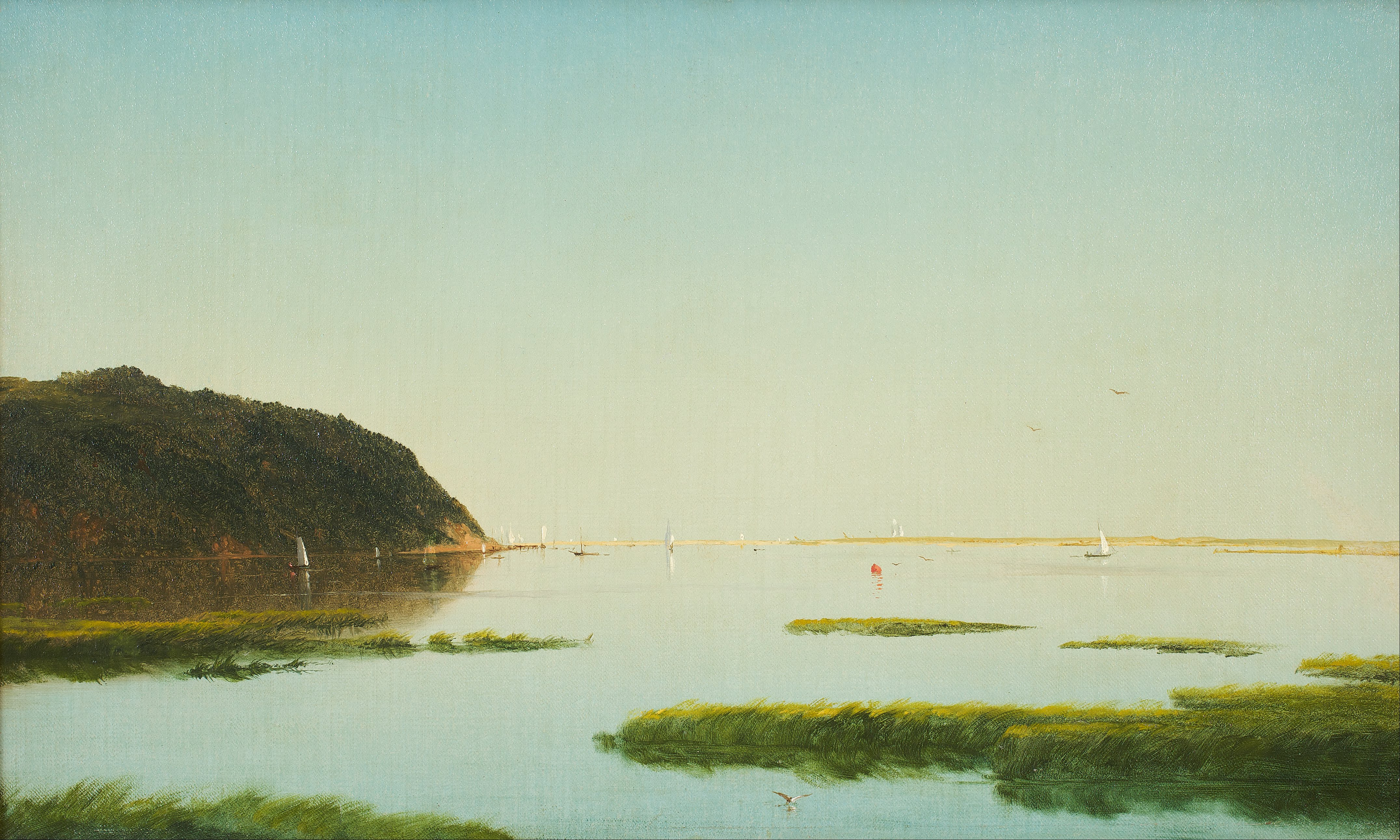
View of the Shrewsbury River, New Jersey by John Frederick Kensett, 1859

- Navesink River
- Pleasure Bay

== Bridges ==
- Capt. Joseph Azzolina Memorial Bridge
- Bascule Bridge
- Gooseneck Point Bridge

== See also ==
- List of New Jersey rivers
- Navesink River
- Raritan River
- Raritan Bay
- Lower New York Bay
