= Glendola =

Glendola may refer to:

- Glendola Reservoir
- Glendola, New Jersey
