= List of highways numbered S28 =

Route S28 may refer to:

== United States ==
- County Route S28 (California)
- Route S28
