= Delicious Orchards =

Coordinates: 40.282848°N 74.172585°W

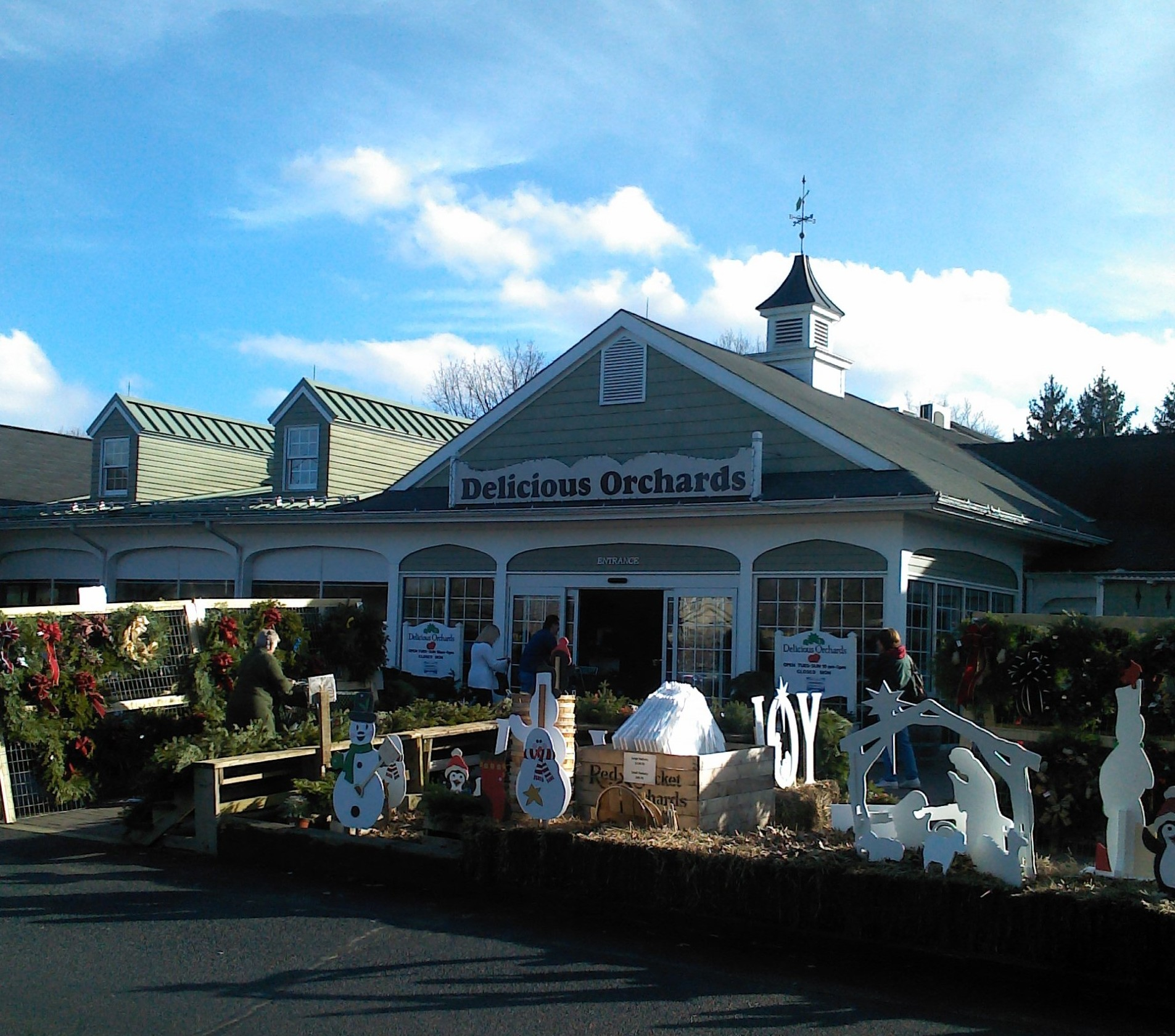
- Company type: Private
- Industry: Farmers' market
- Founded: 1911
- Founder: Carroll W. Barclay
- Headquarters: Colts Neck, New Jersey, U.S.
- Key people: Bill McDonald, President & CEO
- Number of employees: 250-300 (2015)
- Website: deliciousorchardsnj.com

Delicious Orchards is a farm and country food market located in Colts Neck, New Jersey, United States.

== History ==
Delicious Orchards began in 1911 as a small orchard located on a farm road (present day CR 537), connecting Colts Neck with Freehold. The Applegate family, of Freehold Township, bought the orchard in 1922, having three generations of the family run the farm.

In the 1950s, Carroll W. Barclay, the son of the original owners, took over the operation of the farm. He altered the concept of the business from being strictly wholesale to a combination of retail. In 1959, Barclay hauled several wagonloads of apples to the roadside and set up a makeshift stand. This idea proved a success, and in 1960, a 1,200 square feet (110 m^{2}) stand was built, which led to modern day Delicious Orchards. Carolyn Barclay Smith and her husband William E. Smith joined their brother Carroll and ran the store and farm for nearly 25 years. Product lines were expanded to include fresh apple cider.

In the 1960s, the Barclays transitioned to a year-round business with the addition of more produce and baked goods. In 1966, the Barclays bought a building on Route 34 at the current location of Delicious Orchards.

== The farm today ==
Patrons have access to a variety of fresh foods from the several departments of Delicious Orchards.

Delicious Orchards is now owned and operated by Bill and Linda McDonald.

The farm is located on Route 34 between Route 18 and County Route 537.
