= New Jersey Route 172 =

State highway in New Brunswick, New Jersey, United States

Route 172
- George Street

Route information
- Maintained by NJDOT
- Length: 0.69 mi (1,110 m)
- Existed: 1955–present

Major junctions
- West end: CR 527 in New Brunswick
- East end: Route 18 / CR 527 in New Brunswick

Location
- Country: United States
- State: New Jersey
- Counties: Middlesex

Highway system
- New Jersey State Highway Routes; Interstate; US; State; Scenic Byways
← Route 171	→ Route 173

Route 172 is a short state highway in New Brunswick, New Jersey, United States. The designation runs along the southernmost leg of George Street, which is county and city-maintained the rest of the way. Route 172 is 0.69 miles (1.11 km) long, serving as a connector from an intersection with County Route 527 (CR 527) and Paul Robeson Boulevard to an interchange with Route 18. The highway was assigned in the 1950s, when nearby Route 18 was realigned onto a new freeway over Burnet Street in New Brunswick. Route 172 underwent a major upgrade during the reconstruction of Route 18, including a roundabout at an intersection with CR 617, and a brand-new interchange with the local lanes of Route 18.

== Route description ==
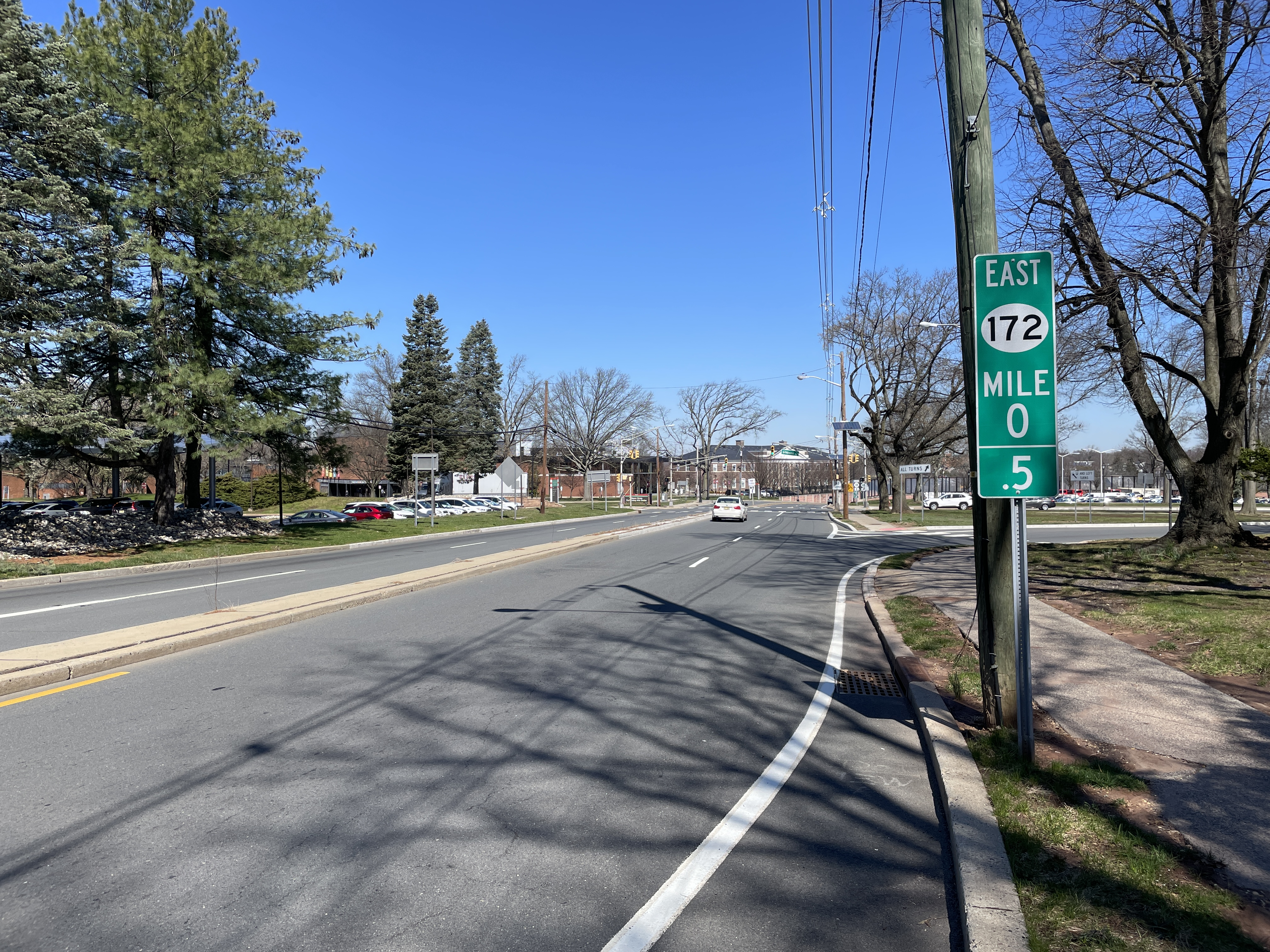
Route 172 eastbound past CR 617 in New Brunswick

Route 172 begins at the intersection of Paul Robeson Boulevard (formerly Commercial Avenue prior to 2019) and George Street (CR 527, signed as CR 672) in New Brunswick. Route 172 (with CR 527 unsigned at this point) travels as a two-lane road southeast along George Street first passing residences before intersecting Bishop Street and Jones Avenue where both sides of the road become flanked by the Douglass Campus of Rutgers University. It intersects Nichol Avenue and Chapel Drive which both serve the campus. The road crosses a small stream and passes under a pedestrian overpass before reaching a roundabout marking the northern terminus of CR 617 (Ryders Lane). Route 172 turns to the north and becomes a four-lane small divided highway. A pair of jughandles serve Gibbons Drive with a signalized intersection in the center. Past this intersection, a ramp providing access for eastbound Route 172 traffic to Route 18 south exits the state highway. Route 172 crosses over the southbound lanes and the northbound express lanes of Route 18 before the state highway terminates at a signalized intersection with the northbound local lanes of Route 18.

== History ==
Route 172 originated as alignment of State Highway Route S-28, which was assigned in the 1927 state highway renumbering. In the 1953 renumbering, State Highway Route S-28 was reassigned as Route 18. However, just a few years after the designation of Route 18 in New Brunswick along George Street, construction of a bypass around New Brunswick began. The highway was constructed along Burnet Street, which became state-maintained by the State Highway Department. The route was completed to Route 27, and Route 18 was moved onto that alignment. The former alignment of Route 18 remained state-maintained up to the intersection with Commercial Avenue, which was eventually re-designated as Route 172.

The interchange of Route 18 and Route 172 in New Brunswick

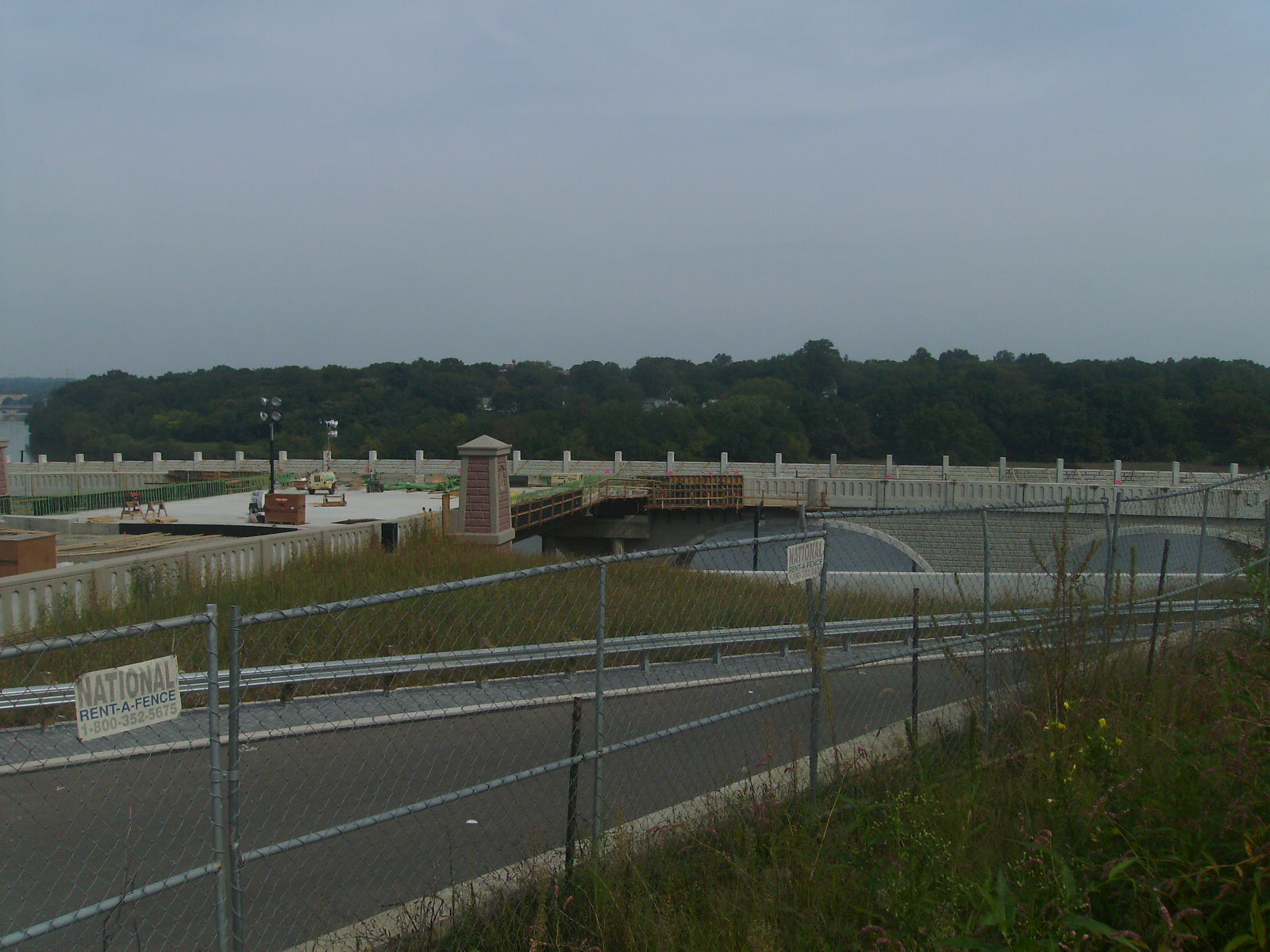
Construction in 2008 of the interchange between Routes 18 and 172 in New Brunswick

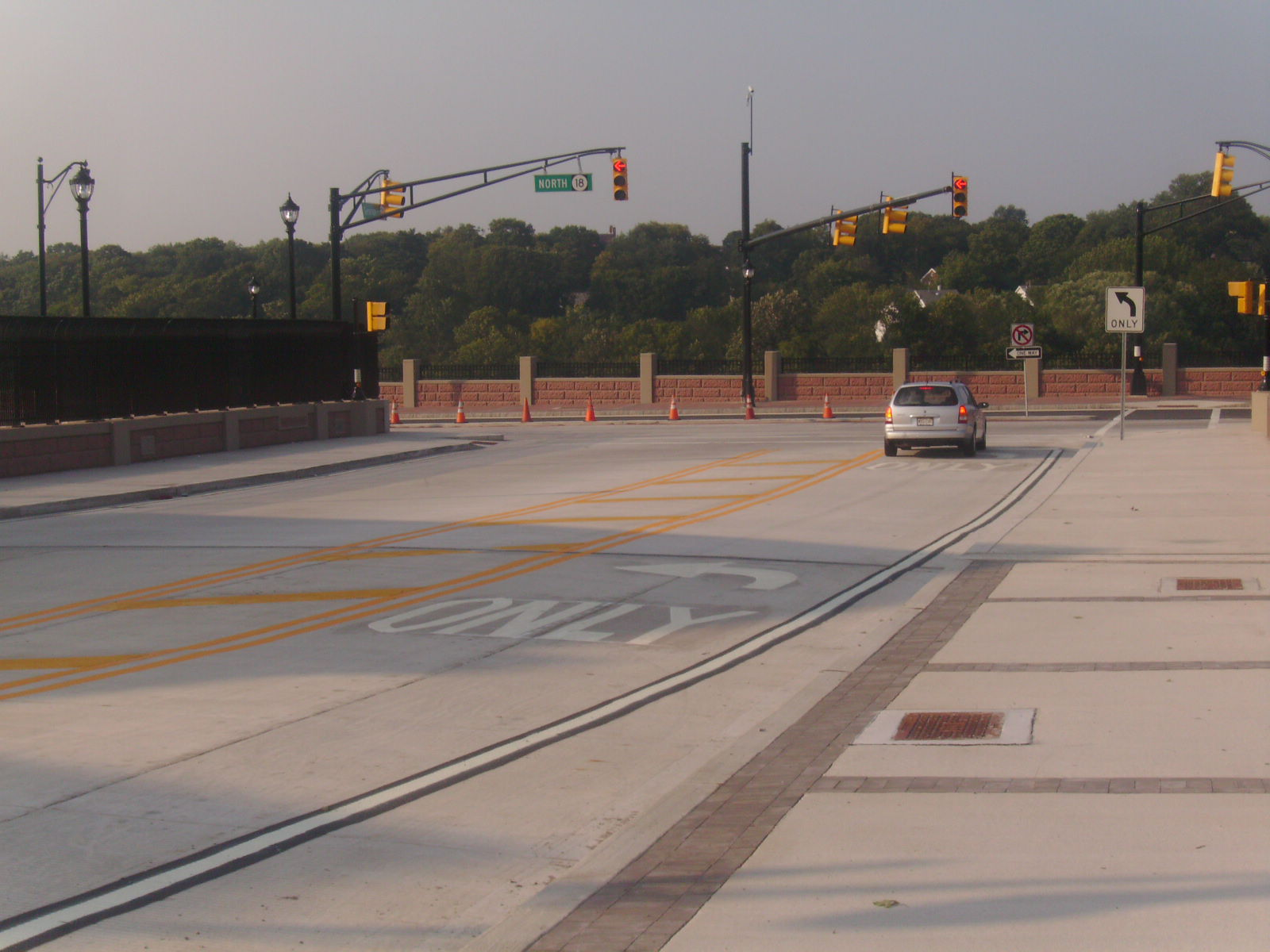
The completed interchange facing Route 172's new eastern terminus at Route 18's local lanes.

When the New Jersey Department of Transportation started construction on upgrading the bypass, the fly-over ramp and on-ramp to and from Route 172 were torn down for construction of a new interchange along a new local/express format. The overpass was closed on October 12, 2007 to begin the construction. The bridge was built by 1955 and was replaced in 2008. On January 2, 2009, the new exit ramp for Route 18 to Route 172 was reopened to traffic.

== Major intersections ==
The entire route is in New Brunswick, Middlesex County.

mi	km	Destinations	Notes
0.00	0.00	CR 527 north (George Street)	Continuation north; western end of CR 527 concurrency
0.69	1.11	Route 18 (CR 527 south) to I-95 / N.J. Turnpike / I-287	Interchange; eastern terminus; eastern end of CR 527 concurrency
1.000 mi = 1.609 km; 1.000 km = 0.621 mi: Concurrency terminus
