= County Route 520 (New Jersey) =

County highway in New Jersey, U.S.

County Route 520
- CR 520 highlighted in red

Route information
- Length: 22.39 mi (36.03 km)

Major junctions
- West end: CR 527 in Old Bridge Township
- US 9 in Marlboro Township; Route 18 / CR 3 in Marlboro Township; Route 79 in Marlboro Township; Route 34 in Holmdel Township; G.S. Parkway in Middletown Township; Route 35 in Red Bank
- East end: Route 36 in Sea Bright

Location
- Country: United States
- State: New Jersey
- Counties: Middlesex, Monmouth

Highway system
- County routes in New Jersey; 500-series routes
← CR 519	→ CR 521

County Route 520 (CR 520) is a county highway in the U.S. state of New Jersey. CR 520 is a major road across Monmouth County connecting the county's central towns to the Jersey Shore at Sea Bright. The highway extends 22.3 miles (35.9 km) from Englishtown Road (CR 527) in Old Bridge Township to Ocean Avenue (Route 36) in Sea Bright.

CR 520 extends east along Texas Road to the intersection of Marlboro Road, then turns southeast onto Marlboro Road. Texas Road continues beyond Marlboro Road as CR 690. CR 520 is under municipal (Old Bridge Township and Marlboro townships) jurisdiction between Texas Road and US 9. From US 9 to its eastern terminus it is under Monmouth County jurisdiction. CR 520 is known by several names between US 9 and Route 35, among them Robertsville Road, West Main Street, East Main Street, Newman Springs Road and simply Route 520, but for the greater part of its distance it is Newman Springs Road. At Route 35, CR 520 turns briefly north on Broad Street in Red Bank, then turns east again onto Pinckney Road, which it follows into Little Silver. It continues through Little Silver along Branch Avenue before turning onto Rumson Road, which it then follows through Rumson to its terminus at the intersection with Ocean Avenue (Route 36) in Sea Bright.

== Route description ==
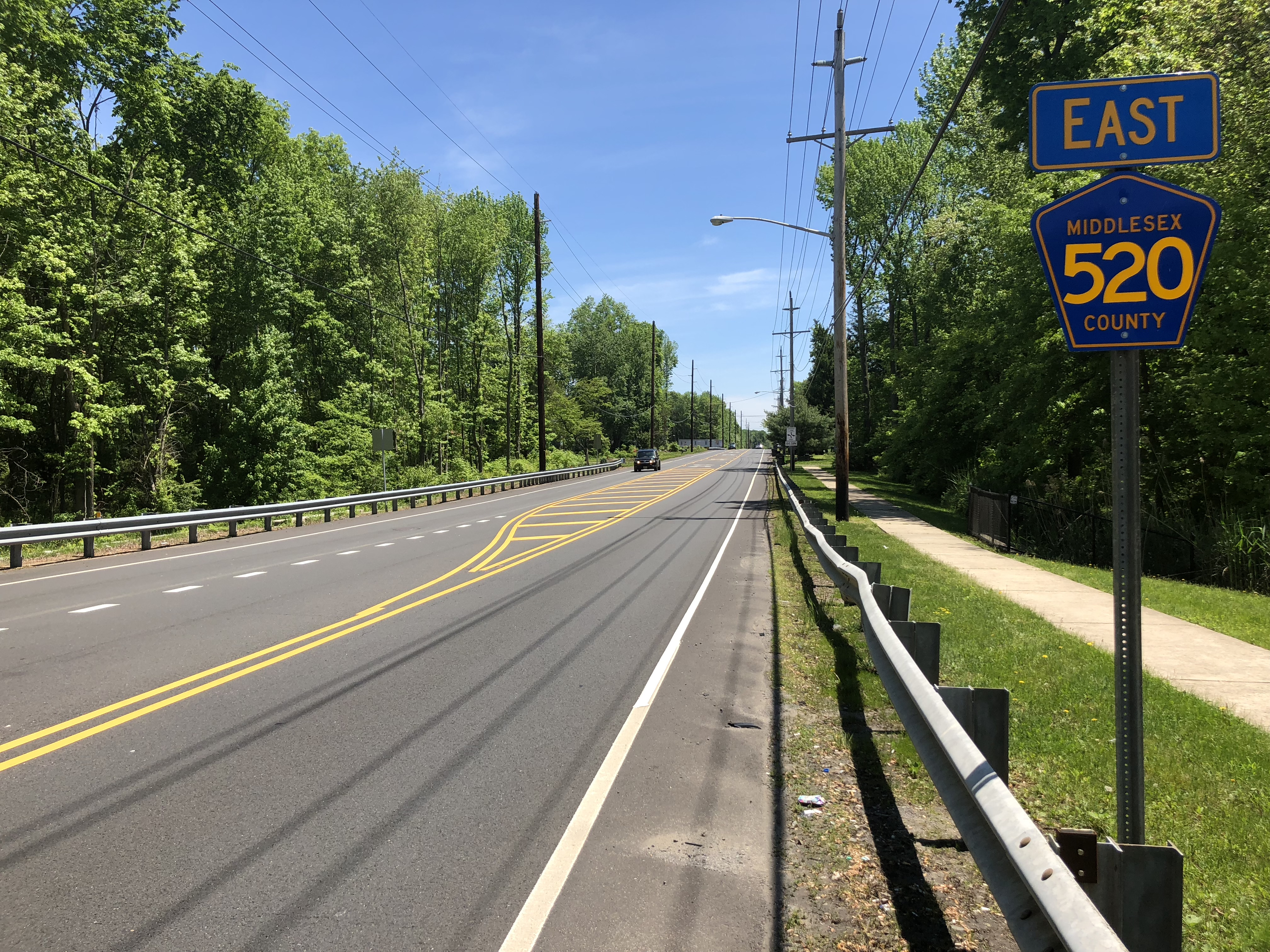
View east along CR 520 at CR 527 in Old Bridge

CR 520 begins at an intersection of Englishtown Road (CR 527) in Old Bridge Township, Middlesex County, heading east on two-lane undivided Texas Road. The route heads through dense forests before it comes to an intersection of Marlboro Road. At this point, CR 690 continues east along Texas Road and CR 520 heads southeast on Marlboro Road. The road passes near a housing development and crosses into Marlboro Township in Monmouth County, becoming Robertsville Road, where it widens to four lanes as it crosses the intersection of US 9 in an area of businesses. Past this intersection, the route narrows back to two lanes and passes through wooded residential areas before it crosses the intersection of Tennent Road (CR 3) and comes to a partial interchange with Route 18; missing movements are provided by Tennent Road (CR 3). Following this, CR 520 continues past more housing developments and curves to the east, becoming Newman Springs Road. The road crosses the intersection of Route 79 and runs through a mix of fields and woods with some homes, heading to the east-northeast. The route becomes the border between Marlboro to the north and Colts Neck Township to the south as it heads more to the east.

CR 520 crosses the Willow Brook into Holmdel Township shortly before it reaches an intersection of Route 34. After this intersection of Route 34, the road passes between a corporate park to the north and fields to the south before it crosses the intersection with Holmdel Road (CR 4) and runs past residential neighborhoods. The route passes to the north of Thompson Park and enters Middletown Township at the intersection of Everett Road (CR 52). CR 520 curves southeast and heads east to a roundabout at the entrance road to Brookdale Community College. Farther east, the route intersects Swimming River Road/Middletown-Lincroft Road (CR 50) in a commercial area, at which point it widens to four lanes. The road heads past homes and crosses under Normandy Road and a railroad line which link the two sections of Naval Weapons Station Earle, where it briefly becomes a divided highway. A short distance later, CR 520 comes to an interchange with the Garden State Parkway. At this interchange, park and ride lots are located at the northwest and northeast corners. Following this, the route becomes a divided highway again and runs past a few businesses before it crosses the Swimming River and becomes the border between Red Bank to the north and Tinton Falls to the south. The road becomes undivided again as it passes homes. Upon crossing the intersection of Shrewsbury Avenue (CR 13), CR 520 narrows to two lanes and passes businesses as it separates Red Bank to the north and Shrewsbury to the south. The road crosses the Southern Secondary railroad line operated by the Delaware and Raritan River Railroad and continues east to an intersection of Route 35.

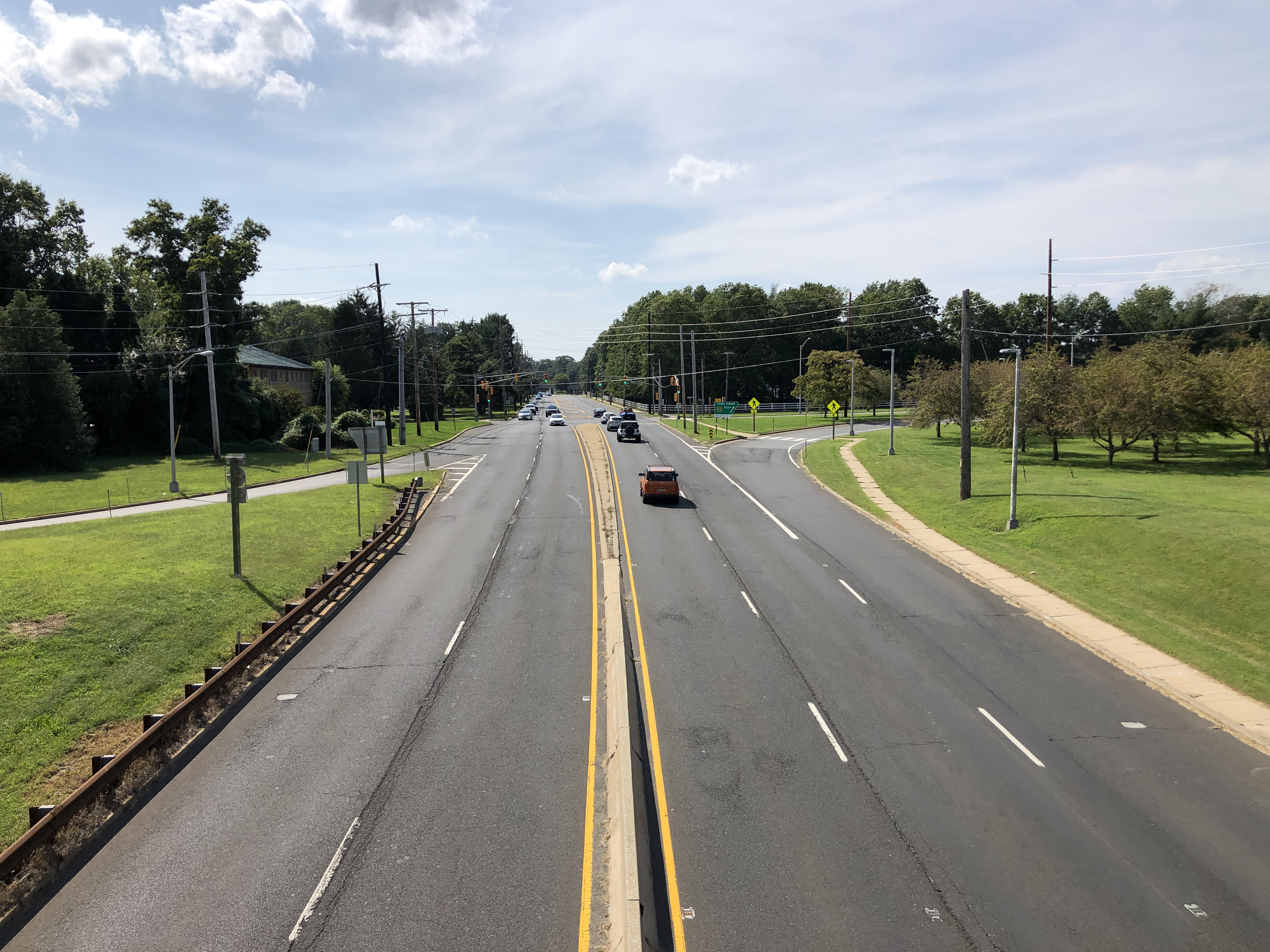
View westbound along CR 520 from the Garden State Parkway in Middletown Township

At this point, CR 520 turns north to briefly run concurrently with Route 35, crossing NJ Transit's North Jersey Coast Line. Immediately after the railroad tracks, Route 35 splits to the northwest on Maple Avenue and CR 520 continues north on two-lane Broad Street for one block before it turns east onto Pinckney Road, with CR 11 continuing north on Broad Street. CR 520 runs through wooded residential areas and leaves Red Bank for Little Silver. At an intersection of Branch Avenue (CR 11), the route turns southeast onto Branch Avenue. CR 520 turns northeast onto Rumson Road and CR 11 continues southeast along Branch Avenue. The road passes more homes and continues into Rumson. CR 520 continues northeast and passes to the north of Rumson Country Club. Farther east, the route curves to the east and crosses the Shrewsbury River via the Rumson–Sea Bright Bridge into Sea Bright. Immediately after the bridge, CR 520 reaches its eastern terminus at an intersection with Ocean Avenue (Route 36) near the Atlantic Ocean.

== Major intersections ==
County	Location	mi	km	Destinations	Notes
Middlesex	Old Bridge Township	0.00	0.00	CR 527 (Englishtown Road)	Western terminus
Monmouth	Marlboro Township	2.84	4.57	US 9 – The Amboys, Freehold Township	
Monmouth	Marlboro Township	4.18	6.73	CR 3 (Tennent Road) – Matawan, Tennent Route 18 – Shore Points, New Brunswick	Exit 29 (Route 18)
Monmouth	Marlboro Township	6.68	10.75	Route 79 – Matawan, Freehold Borough	
Monmouth	Holmdel Township	9.53	15.34	Route 34 – Matawan, Wall Township	Paved from Red Bank to Bradevelt in 1924
Monmouth	Middletown Township	14.84– 14.89	23.88– 23.96	G.S. Parkway	Exit 109 (Garden State Parkway)
Monmouth	Red Bank	16.81	27.05	Route 35 south (Broad Street) – Point Pleasant	Western end of Route 35 concurrency
Monmouth	Red Bank	16.84	27.10	Route 35 north (Maple Avenue)	Eastern end of Route 35 concurrency
Monmouth	Sea Bright	22.39	36.03	Route 36 (Ocean Avenue)	
1.000 mi = 1.609 km; 1.000 km = 0.621 mi: Concurrency terminus; Tolled
