= Rumson–Sea Bright Bridge =

Lifting road bridge in New Jersey, US

- The 2025 bridge as seen from Route 36 in Sea Bright
- Coordinates: 40.3655°N 73.9757°W
- Carries: 2 lanes of CR 520, pedestrians and bicycles
- Crosses: Shrewsbury River
- Locale: Sea Bright, New Jersey and Rumson, New Jersey
- Official name: Rumson–Sea Bright Bridge S-32
- Maintained by: Monmouth County Division of Engineering

History
- Opened: 1870 (first); 1950 (second); 2025 (current)

Location
- Interactive map of Rumson–Sea Bright Bridge

The Rumson–Sea Bright Bridge (officially the Rumson–Sea Bright Bridge S-32) is a double leaf bascule bridge that carries County Route 520 over the Shrewsbury River from Rumson to Sea Bright, in Monmouth County, New Jersey.

== Early bridges ==
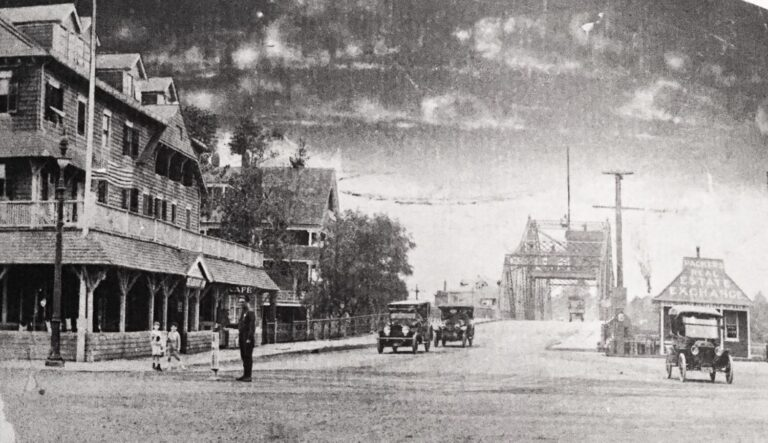
1901 span in 1916

The first bridge across the Shrewsbury River connecting Sea Bright to Rumson was a wooden drawbridge constructed in 1870. This was replaced in 1881 by an iron bridge, which was replaced by temporary wooden bridge in 1900 and then a 660-foot steel swing bridge in 1901.

== 1950 bridge ==
The existing span that connects from Rumson to Ocean Avenue in Sea Bright was built in 1950. It is located more northbound than former spans. The 1950 bridge has become harder to maintain over time and had required repairs twice, once in 2002 and again in 2013.

== Replacement bridge ==
Due to the structural deficiency and functionally obsolete state of the existing structure, Monmouth County had announced plans for a replacement of the existing span at a site south of the current crossing. They predicted that the project would be complete by 2020.

Construction began in 2022. The new bridge will include two wide shoulders, something the original bridge lacked. It will also include other improvements, such as modernized draw controls, an access ramp to the nearby Sea Bright Beach from the Route 36 intersection, pedestrian beacons and striped crosswalks with the Ward Avenue intersection, and upgrades to the nearby Sea Bright park. Demolition of a nearby Dunkin' Donuts was deemed necessary in order to construct the replacement bridge. The bridge replacement project was scheduled to end in 2025. The new bridge opened to traffic on July 31, 2025.
