= New Jersey Route 138 =

State highway in New Jersey, US

Route 138

Route information
- Auxiliary route of I-195
- Maintained by NJDOT
- Length: 3.52 mi (5.66 km)
- Existed: 1988–present

Major junctions
- West end: I-195 / G.S. Parkway / Route 34 in Wall Township
- Route 18 in Wall Township
- East end: Route 35 in Wall Township

Location
- Country: United States
- State: New Jersey
- Counties: Monmouth

Highway system
- New Jersey State Highway Routes; Interstate; US; State; Scenic Byways
← Route 133	→ Route 139

Route 138 is a state highway located entirely in Monmouth County, New Jersey that extends for 3.52 miles (5.66 km). The route's western terminus is at the eastern end of Interstate 195 at the interchange with Route 34 in Wall Township. Route 138's eastern terminus is at Route 35 in Wall Township. The highway is also meant to be an evacuation route in case of a disaster, where the eastbound lanes (as well as the eastbound lanes on Interstate 195) would be reversed all the way to the New Jersey Turnpike.

The highway was first built as part of the planned Route 38 freeway in 1941, which was to traverse the state from Camden to Belmar. When it became clear that the gap between two sections of Route 38 would not be filled, the New Jersey Department of Transportation re-designated the eastern portion as Route 138.

== Route description ==
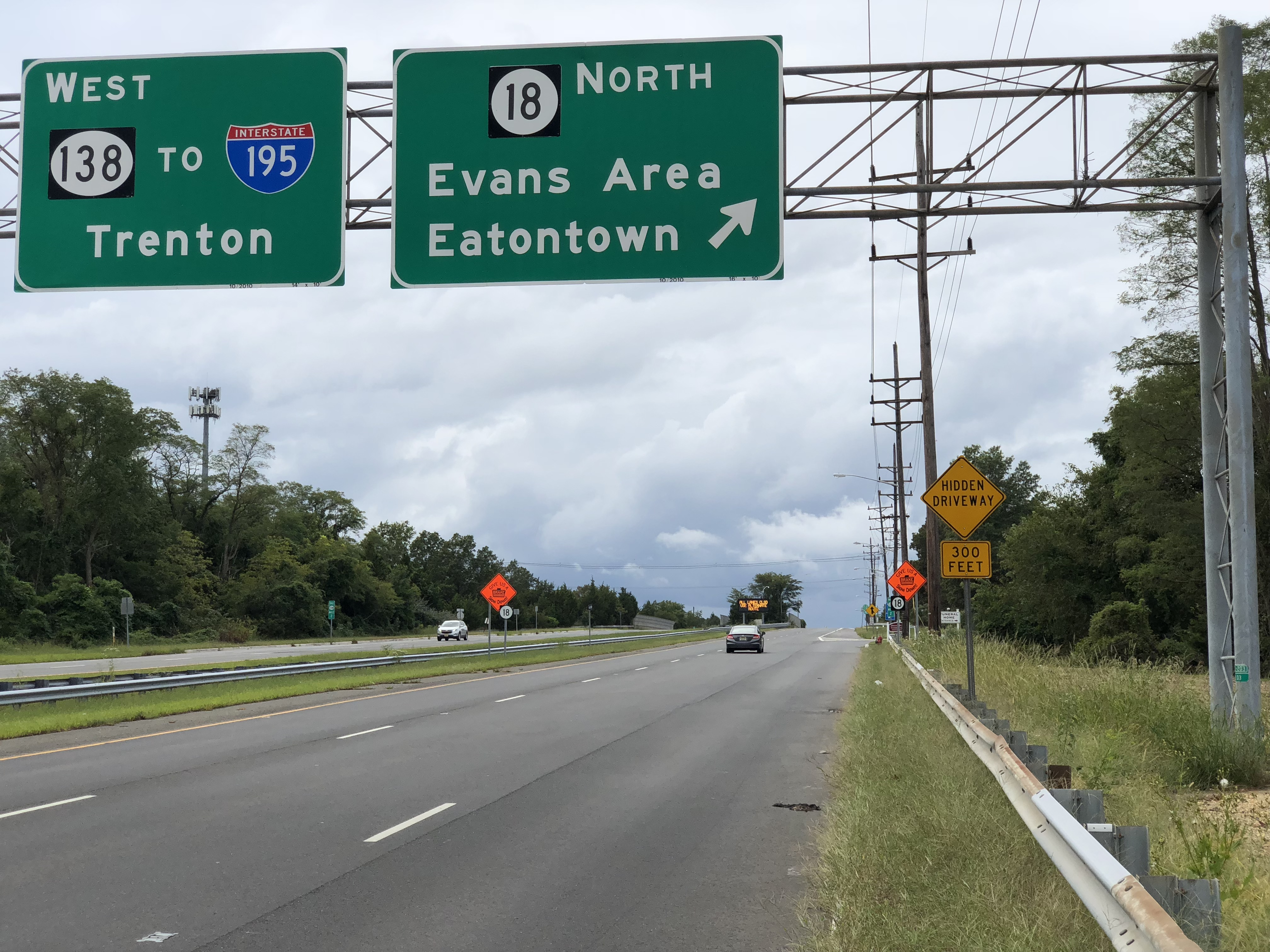
Route 138 westbound at Route 18 in Wall

Route 138 begins at exit 35A of Interstate 195 at Route 34 in Wall Township. The eastern continuation of Interstate 195, Route 138 continues as a four-lane freeway through Monmouth County. The route interchanges with Route 34 southbound at exit 35A and northbound at exit 35B. A short distance later, the highway crosses to the south of a construction site and crosses over the southbound lanes of the Garden State Parkway (Route 444) and intersects with the on-ramp from the southbound lanes. The highway crosses over the northbound lanes and reaches exit 36, which serves the Parkway and a nearby park and ride. Continuing on, Route 138 becomes a four-lane arterial road and intersects with Allenwood Road in a rather dense area of Wall Township.

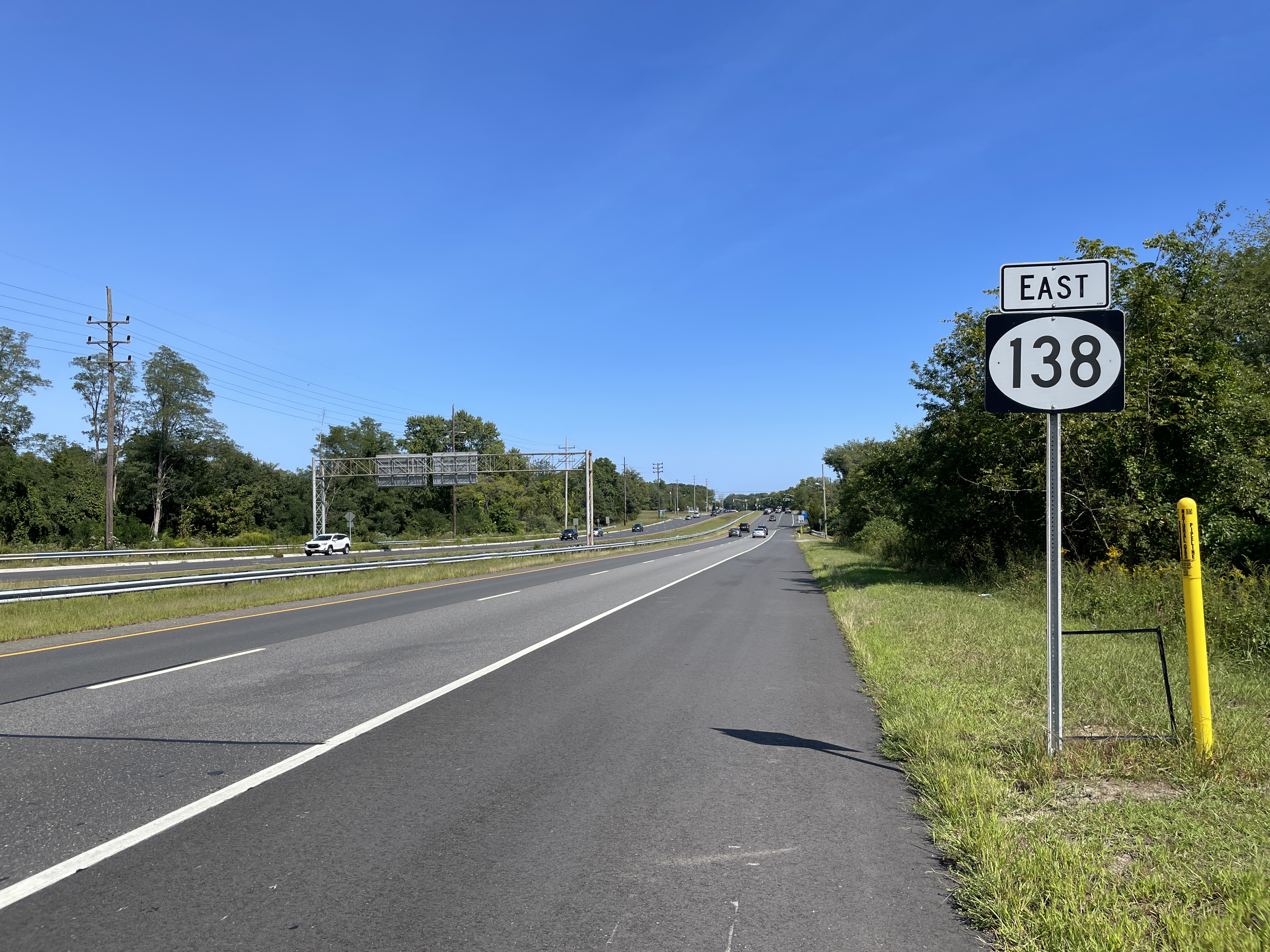
View east along Route 138 at Route 18 in Wall

Route 138 continues further, passing to the south and to the north of commercial complexes along with several residential areas. The highway then proceeds to a small interchange with Club Drive, which serves a mix of residential homes and commercial buildings. From there, Route 138 becomes surrounded by patches of trees before interchanging with the southern terminus of Route 18 soon after. The route passes north along the interchange, where stub ramps along Route 18 can be seen to the south. After crossing Route 18, Route 138 continues on, entering a large commercial district, intersecting with New Bedford Road in the community of Wall. The highway continues as a four-lane arterial road, serving Wall High School and local residential homes for a long distance. Route 138 intersects with Marconi Road and Bayshore Court before ending at a large interchange with Route 35.

== History ==
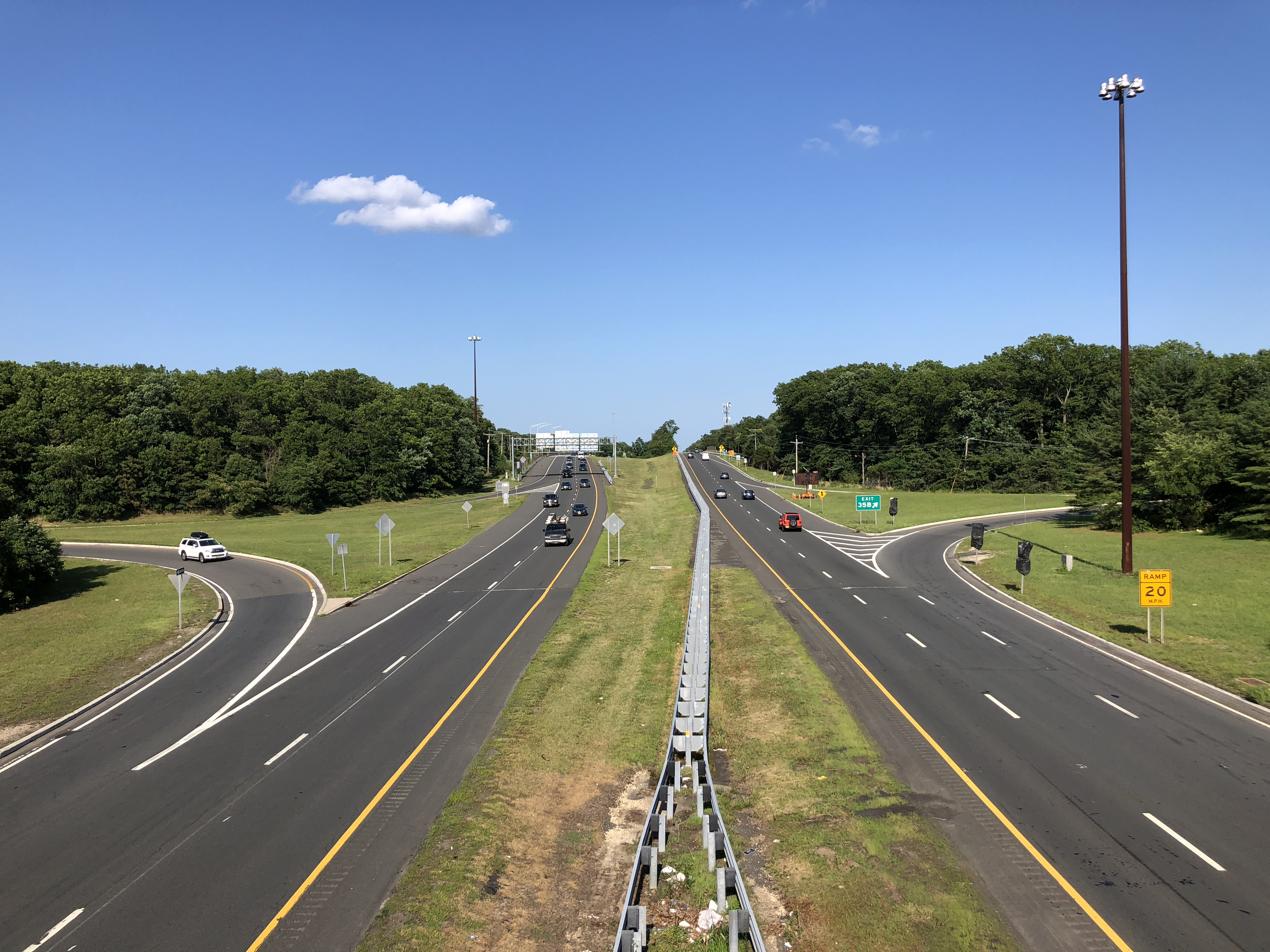
Route 138 eastbound at Route 34 in Wall

The current alignment of Route 138 originates as an alignment of the State Highway Route 38 assigned in 1938. At that point, Route 38 was proposed as a highway from Camden (where it would end), past its former terminus at State Highway Route 39 to an intersection with State Highway Route 4-N in the community of Wall Township east of Fort Dix. A short portion of the highway was constructed from State Highway Route 34 to State Highway Route 35 was constructed as Route 38, which survived the 1953 state highway renumbering. During the 1960s, the New Jersey State Highway Department began to lay out a network of limited-access state highways across the state. The Route 38 freeway was proposed as a highway from Interstate 676 in Camden to current-day Route 18 in Wall Township, to relieve congestion off of Route 70. The freeway was readopted by the Delaware Valley Regional Planning Commission for the new Route 38 freeway from the Ben Franklin Bridge eastward (paralleling Route 70 and U.S. Route 30) to the area of Jackson Township, where it would follow current Interstate 195's alignment. The 33.5-mile-long (53.9 km) freeway was estimated by the highway department to cost $60 million (equivalent to $526.8 million in 2025) and to be finished around 1985. The proposal lasted through the 1970s, along with a cost adjustment in 1972, inflating the amount to construct the freeway at $101 million (equivalent to $777.4 million in 2025). By the end of the 1970s, the Route 38 freeway was facing opposition and limited resources, so the project was shelved. On July 29, 1988, the portion of Route 38 from Route 34 to Route 35 was re-designated to Route 138.

== Major intersections ==
The entire route is in Wall Township, Monmouth County.

mi	km	Exit	Destinations	Notes
0.00	0.00		I-195 west – Trenton	Continuation west
0.00	0.00	35	G.S. Parkway south / Route 34 – Matawan, Brielle, Point Pleasant	Signed as exits 35A (south) and 35B (north); exit nos. correspond to Interstate 195; exit 98 on Garden State Parkway
0.28– 0.36	0.45– 0.58	36	G.S. Parkway north	Exit no. corresponds to Interstate 195; exit 98 on Garden State Parkway
		Eastern end of freeway section		
1.68	2.70		Route 18 north – Eatontown	Interchange; southern terminus and exits 6A-B on Route 18
3.52	5.66		Route 35 – Belmar, Asbury Park, Sea Girt	Eastern terminus
1.000 mi = 1.609 km; 1.000 km = 0.621 mi: Incomplete access; Tolled
