= John A. Lynch Sr. Memorial Bridge =

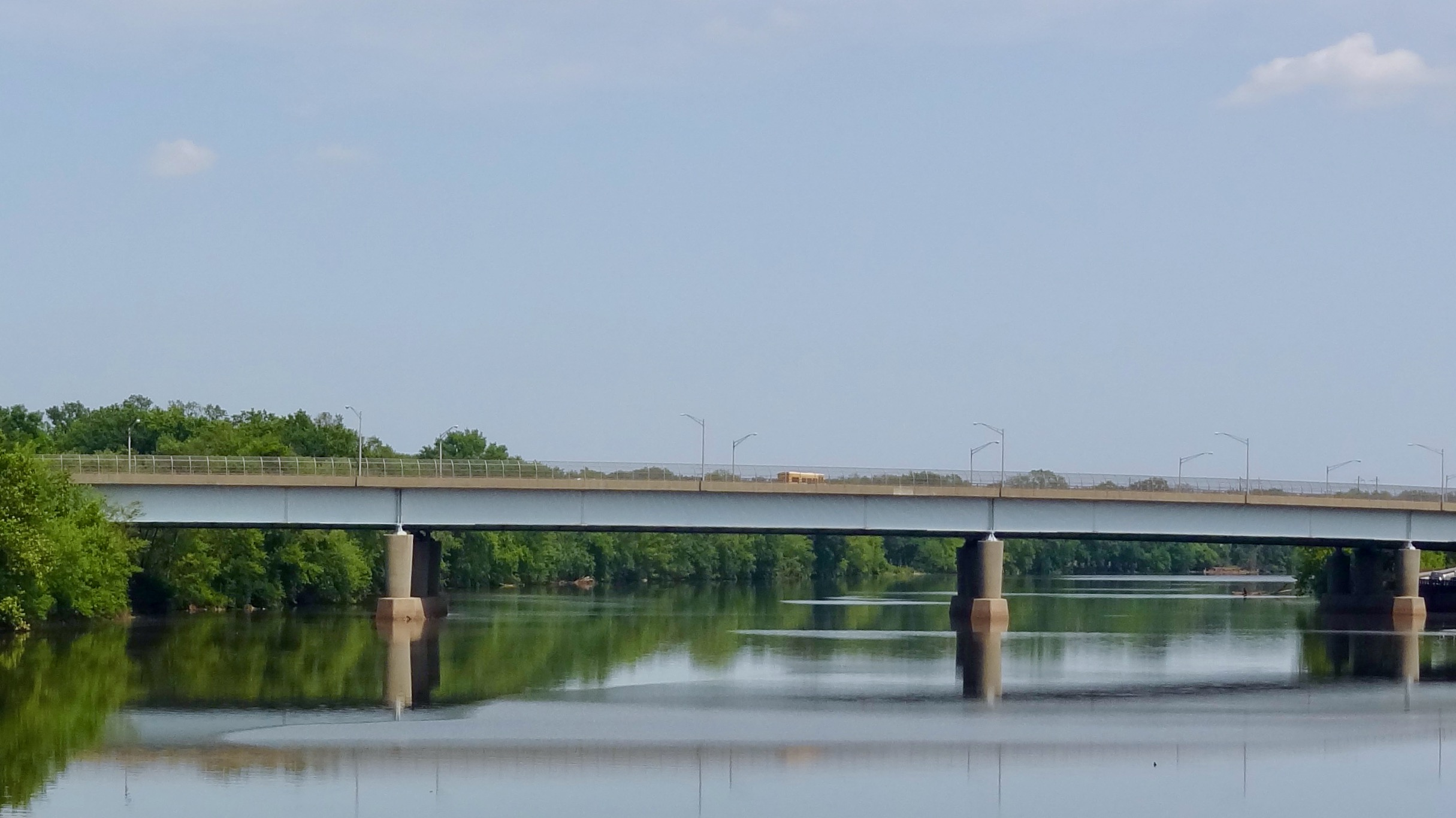
- Coordinates: 40°30′29″N 74°27′30″W
- Carries: Route 18
- Crosses: Raritan River
- Locale: New Brunswick and Piscataway, Middlesex County, New Jersey
- Other name(s): Raritan River Bridge
- Named for: John A. Lynch Sr.
- Maintained by: NJDOT

History
- Construction start: Late 1960s
- Opened: 1983

The John A. Lynch Sr. Memorial Bridge is a bridge on Route 18 in the U.S. state of New Jersey spanning the Raritan River. The bridge connects Piscataway on the north with New Brunswick on the south.

== History ==
Construction on the bridge had begun back in the late 1960s with the announcement of Route 18's upgrade to a freeway between New Brunswick and Middlesex, and by 1970, the bridge piers were in place. However, environmental concerns stalled the construction of the Route 18 freeway for almost a decade, and the piers stood unfinished until 1983 when the freeway and bridge were finally completed as far as River Road in Piscataway.

The bridge was originally known as the Raritan River Bridge, but was renamed in honor of John A. Lynch Sr., the former State Senator from the district that included New Brunswick and Piscataway, a former mayor of New Brunswick, and the father and namesake of John A. Lynch Jr., who held those positions at the time of the bridge's completion.

== See also ==
- List of crossings of the Raritan River
