= New Jersey Route 34 =

State highway in central New Jersey, US

Route 34

Route information
- Maintained by NJDOT
- Length: 26.79 mi (43.11 km)
- Existed: 1927–present

Major junctions
- South end: Route 35 / Route 70 in Wall Township
- I-195 / G.S. Parkway / Route 138 in Wall Township; Route 33 in Howell Township; Route 18 in Colts Neck Township; Route 79 in Matawan
- North end: US 9 in Old Bridge Township

Location
- Country: United States
- State: New Jersey
- Counties: Monmouth, Middlesex

Highway system
- New Jersey State Highway Routes; Interstate; US; State; Scenic Byways
← Route 33A	→ Route 35

Route 34 is a state highway in the central part of the U.S. state of New Jersey. The route runs 26.79 mi (43.11 km) from an intersection with Route 35 and Route 70 (the former Brielle Circle) in Wall Township, Monmouth County, north to an interchange with U.S. Route 9 (US 9) in Old Bridge Township, Middlesex County. The route is a four-lane divided highway between its southern terminus and the north end of the Route 33 concurrency in Howell Township; along this stretch, the route intersects the Garden State Parkway and Interstate 195 (I-195)/Route 138 within a short distance of each other. North of Route 33, Route 34 is an undivided two- to four-lane road that intersects Route 18 in Colts Neck Township and Route 79 in Matawan. Route 34 passes through mostly suburban areas along its route.

The route was legislated in 1927 to run from Route 35 (present Route 88) in Laurelton north to Route 4 (present Route 79) in Matawan. The current alignment of Route 34 north of Matawan was a part of Route 4 (and later US 9) until it became a part of Route 4A following a realignment of US 9 and Route 4. In 1953, Route 34 was extended north along Route 4A to end at US 9 in Old Bridge Township. Meanwhile, the southern terminus was cut back to its current location with the route south of that point becoming a part of Route 70. Since 1953, the southern portion of the route was widened into a divided highway and the Brielle Circle was replaced.

== Route description ==
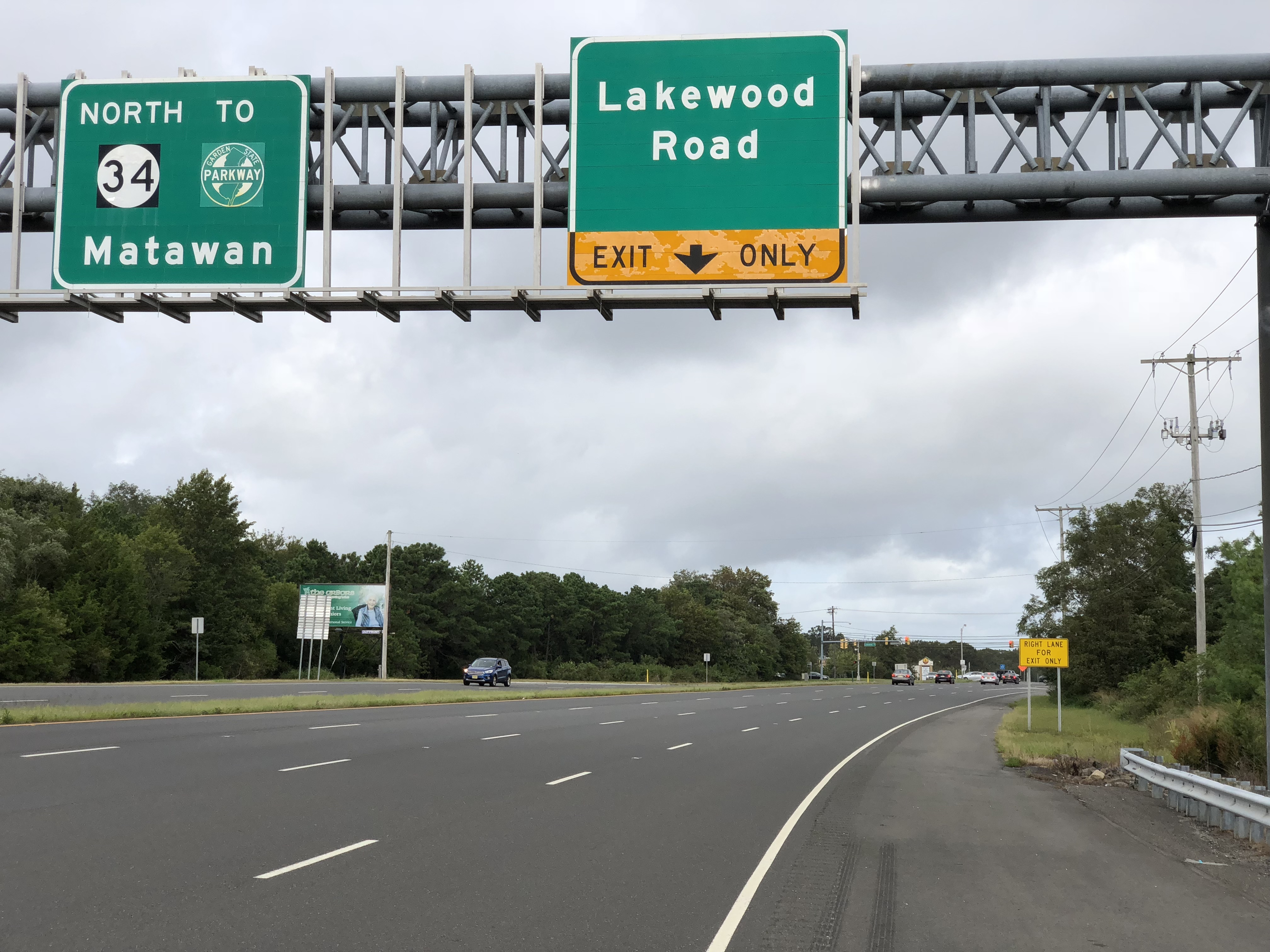
Route 34 northbound just north of Route 35 and Route 70.

Route 34 begins at an intersection with Route 35 and Route 70 in Wall Township, Monmouth County, at the former Brielle Circle, heading to the northwest on a six-lane undivided road. A short distance past this intersection, the route becomes a four-lane divided highway that passes through suburban development with some woods. It passes over the Capital to Coast Trail and meets CR 524 Spur before reaching the Allenwood Circle, where Route 34 intersects CR 524. Past the Allenwood Circle, the road continues northwest to a partial interchange with the Garden State Parkway. This interchange has access to the northbound Garden State Parkway from northbound Route 34, to the southbound Garden State Parkway from southbound Route 34, and to both directions of Route 34 from the southbound Garden State Parkway. Immediately past this interchange, the road intersects CR 30 before coming to a cloverleaf interchange with I-195 and Route 138. Route 34 provides the missing movements between the southbound Garden State Parkway and I-195/Route 138. From here, the road passes through woodland before heading into commercial and industrial areas, where it passes by the Wall Stadium racetrack and the Monmouth Executive Airport. The route enters wooded residential and business areas where it intersects Belmar Boulevard and Megill Road, which are both distinct segments of CR 18. Route 34 continues north before it intersects Route 33 and CR 547 at the Collingwood Circle.

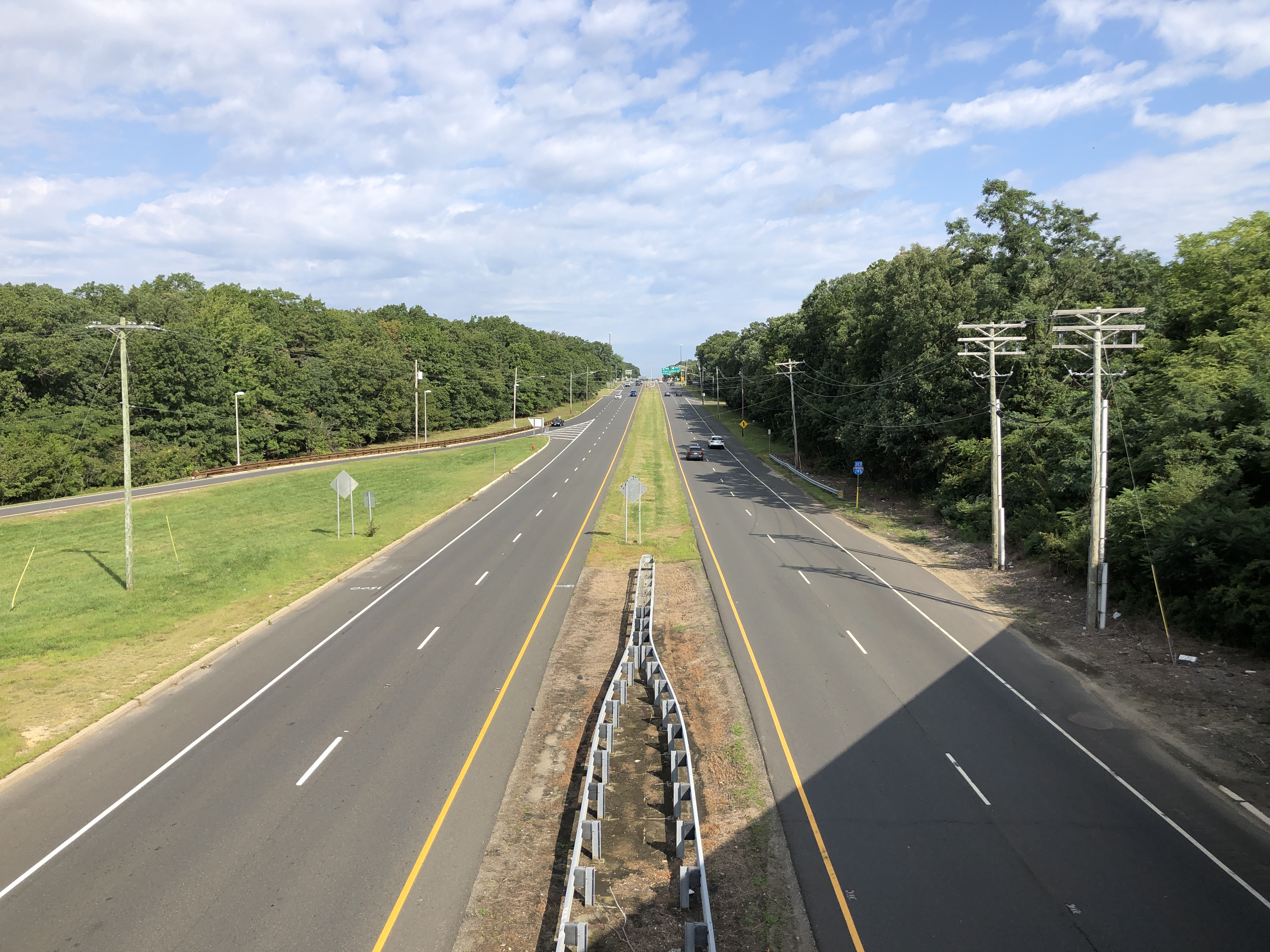
Route 34 northbound at the Garden State Parkway in Wall Township

At the traffic circle, Route 34 turns northwest to run concurrently with Route 33 on a four-lane divided highway that passes businesses, crossing into Howell Township and passing over the Southern Secondary railroad line operated by the Delaware and Raritan River Railroad. The two routes eventually split; Route 34 heads north on a two-lane undivided road. It passes through wooded areas of Naval Weapons Station Earle and enters Colts Neck Township. Upon leaving the grounds of Naval Weapons Station Earle, the route widens into a four-lane divided highway again and comes to a cloverleaf interchange with the Route 18 freeway. Past this interchange, Route 34 becomes a two-lane undivided road that passes development and Delicious Orchards before crossing CR 537. From here, the road heads past suburban neighborhoods and farmland, intersecting CR 54 before meeting CR 4. Route 34 briefly runs concurrently with CR 4 until the county route heads northeast on South Street. The route continues into wooded areas of homes, crossing into Holmdel Township, where it has a junction with CR 520.

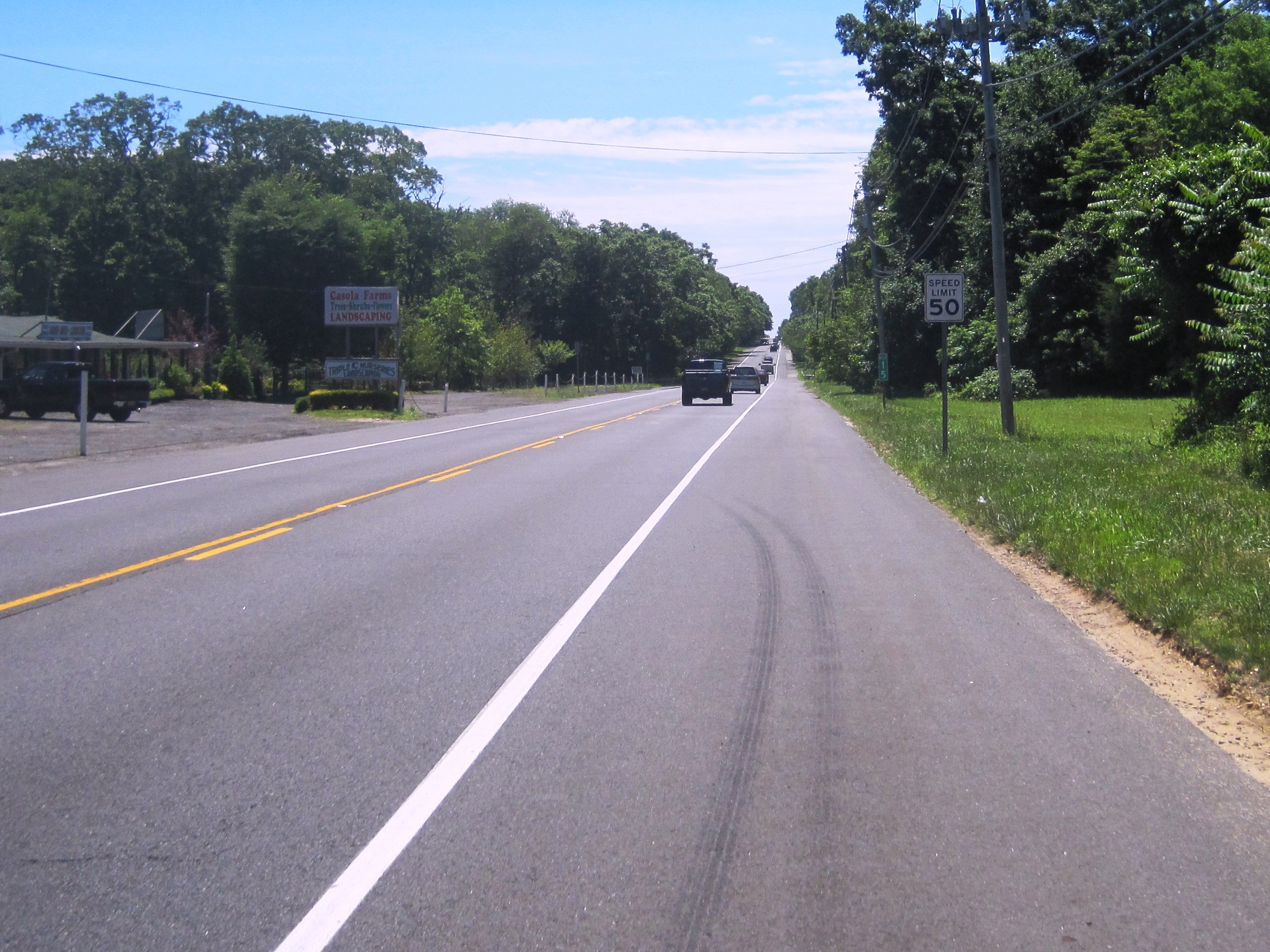
Southbound Route 34 in Colts Neck Township along the two-lane section of the highway

After this intersection, the road continues past homes and farms before turning northwest and entering Marlboro Township. Here, the road heads through wooded residential and commercial areas, briefly becoming a four-lane road, before it crosses into Aberdeen Township. In Aberdeen, Route 34 heads into business areas as it crosses CR 3. The road becomes a three-lane road with a center left-turn lane, forming the border of Matawan to the west and Aberdeen Township to the east. Upon passing under the Henry Hudson Trail, the route entirely enters Matawan, continuing northwest as four-lane Middlesex Street. Here, Route 34 intersects CR 516 and Route 79 and CR 516 Spur. Following these intersections, the road heads into residential and business areas, crossing over Lake Lefferts.

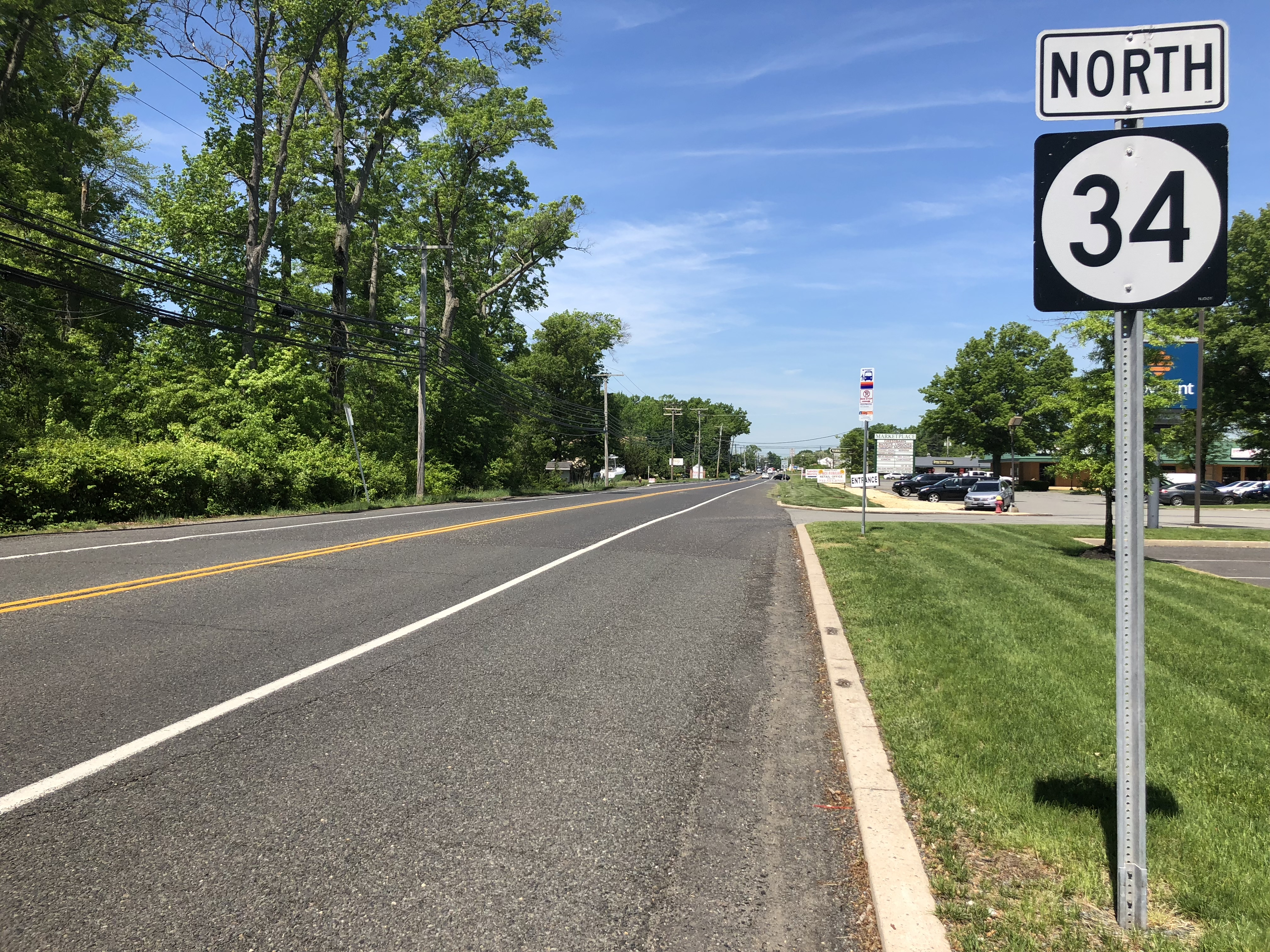
View north along Route 34 at Disbrow Road in Old Bridge

Route 34 crosses into Old Bridge Township, Middlesex County, where it becomes a two-lane road, continuing through commercial areas. The route intersects CR 689, where it turns to the west and passes through areas of residences and businesses and reaches the CR 687 intersection. At the intersection with CR 699, Route 34 turns to the north and intersects another segment of CR 699 known as Spring Hill Road. The road continues north and ends at a partial interchange with US 9, with access to northbound US 9 and access from southbound US 9. Missing movements between Route 34 and US 9 are provided by Perrine Road to the south.

== History ==
The Holmdel and Middletown Point Turnpike was a turnpike chartered on February 28, 1862, and ran between Holmdel Township and Middletown Point (now Matawan). The road's trajectory is now roughly followed by Route 34.

In the 1927 New Jersey state highway renumbering, Route 34 was legislated to run from an intersection with Route 35 (now Route 88 in Laurelton, Ocean County, north to Route 4 (now Route 79) in Matawan, with the portion of current Route 34 north of that intersection legislated as part of Route 4. By the 1940s, US 9 was also designated along the present-day portion of Route 34 that was then a part of Route 4, this would later become Route 4A after US 9 and Route 4 were moved to a new alignment between Freehold and Cheesequake. In the 1953 New Jersey state highway renumbering, Route 34 was extended north along the alignment of Route 4A to end at US 9 in Cheesequake while the southern terminus was cut back to the Brielle Circle intersection with Route 35 and Route 70, the latter having replaced Route 34 south of this point. By 1969, Route 34 was widened into a divided highway as far north as Route 33. The Brielle Circle at the southern terminus of the route was converted into at-grade intersections with traffic lights in 2001.

== Major intersections ==
County	Location	mi	km	Destinations	Notes
Monmouth	Wall Township	0.00	0.00	Route 35 / Route 70 west – Belmar, Seaside Park, Lakehurst, Camden	Former Brielle Circle; southern terminus; eastern terminus of Route 70
Monmouth	Wall Township	1.97	3.17	CR 524 Spur (Atlantic Avenue) – Farmingdale, Sea Girt, Manasquan	Interchange
Monmouth	Wall Township	2.63	4.23	CR 524 (Allaire Road) – Farmingdale, Spring Lake	Allenwood Circle
Monmouth	Wall Township	3.52– 3.61	5.66– 5.81	G.S. Parkway	Exit 98 on G.S. Parkway
Monmouth	Wall Township	4.13	6.65	I-195 west / Route 138 east – Trenton, Belmar	Exits 35A-B on I-195/Route 138
Monmouth	Wall Township	7.26	11.68	CR 547 Spur north (Wyckoff Road)	Southern terminus of CR 547 Spur
Monmouth	Wall Township	7.72	12.42	Route 33 east / CR 547 (Asbury Road) – Ocean Grove, Farmingdale	Collingwood Circle; south end of Route 33 overlap
Monmouth	Howell Township	8.76	14.10	Route 33 west – Freehold, Trenton	Interchange; northbound exit and southbound entrance; north end of Route 33 overlap
Monmouth	Colts Neck Township	12.27	19.75	Route 18 – New Brunswick, Tinton Falls	Exits 19A-B on Route 18
Monmouth	Colts Neck Township	13.21	21.26	CR 537 – Freehold, Eatontown, Fort Monmouth	
Monmouth	Holmdel Township	17.40	28.00	CR 520 (Newman Springs Road / West Main Street) – Bradevelt, Holmdel	
Monmouth	Matawan	22.34	35.95	CR 516 (Broad Street) – Old Bridge, Keyport	
Monmouth	Matawan	22.42	36.08	Route 79 south / CR 516 Spur north (Main Street)	Northern terminus of Route 79; southern terminus of CR 516 Spur
Middlesex	Old Bridge Township	26.79	43.11	US 9 north	Northern terminus
1.000 mi = 1.609 km; 1.000 km = 0.621 mi: Incomplete access; Tolled
