= New Jersey Route 18 =

State highway in central New Jersey, US

Route 18

Route information
- Maintained by NJDOT
- Length: 47.92 mi (77.12 km)
- Existed: 1939–present
- History: Designated in 1927 as Route S28

Major junctions
- South end: Route 138 in Wall Township
- Route 33 in Neptune Township; Route 66 in Neptune Township; G.S. Parkway / Route 36 in Tinton Falls; Route 34 in Colts Neck Township; Route 79 in Marlboro Township; US 9 in Old Bridge Township; CR 535 in East Brunswick; I-95 Toll / N.J. Turnpike in East Brunswick; US 1 in New Brunswick; Route 27 in New Brunswick
- North end: I-287 in Piscataway

Location
- Country: United States
- State: New Jersey
- Counties: Monmouth, Middlesex

Highway system
- New Jersey State Highway Routes; Interstate; US; State; Scenic Byways
← Route 17	→ Route 18N

Route 18 is a 47.92-mile-long (77.12 km) state highway in the central part of the US state of New Jersey. It begins at an intersection with Route 138 in Wall Township, Monmouth County, and ends at Interstate 287 (I-287) in Piscataway, Middlesex County. Route 18 is a major route through Central New Jersey that connects the Jersey Shore to the Raritan Valley region, connecting the seats of Monmouth County (Freehold) and Middlesex County (New Brunswick) respectively. The route runs through Ocean Township, Marlboro Township, East Brunswick, and is the main thoroughfare for Rutgers University. Much of the route is a freeway (including the entire portion in Monmouth County and much of the northern end through New Brunswick and Piscataway). The remainder of the route is an arterial road with traffic lights in the East Brunswick and Old Bridge Township areas, and a boulevard in the remainder of Piscataway. Route 18 was designated in 1939 as a proposed freeway from Old Bridge to Eatontown. The section west of Old Bridge was formerly designated as part Route S28, a prefixed spur of State Highway Route 28 from Middlesex to Matawan. The designation, assigned in the 1927 renumbering, remained until a second renumbering in 1953. At that point, Route S28 was redesignated as Route 18, though the section from Old Bridge to Matawan was signed as TEMP 18, as this section would be decommissioned when the Route 18 freeway was built.

The route originally ended at Route 27 at the border between Highland Park and New Brunswick, but was extended northward to then-County Route 514 Spur (CR 514 Spur), now CR 622, in 1983. The freeway through New Brunswick was constructed during the 1980s over the Delaware and Raritan Canal. Route 18 was further extended to Hoes Lane in Piscataway in 2004 and presently ends at I-287 in Piscataway. The route south of exit 6A in Wall Township was also originally intended to extend to the Brielle Circle and terminate at Route 34, Route 35, and Route 70, but there are no plans to do so currently.

== Route description ==
=== Monmouth County ===
Route 18 begins at a partial-cloverleaf interchange with Route 138 in Wall Township. At the southern end of the interchange, the right-of-way and unused pavement for the southern extension is visible along with the former on-ramp from Route 138 to Route 18 northbound. The highway heads northward as a four-lane freeway, crossing under Route 138. Route 18 intersects Route 138 westbound and Monmouth Boulevard, a local road in New Bedford. Route 18 then crosses under Monmouth Boulevard and Belmar Boulevard (CR 18) in the community of Glendola. The route continues through Glendola, and intersects Brighton Avenue (exits 7A and 7B southbound). The freeway continues south of the Shark River Golf Course, through Neptune, paralleling Brighton Avenue, and intersects Route 33 and West Sylvania Avenue (CR 17) at exit 8. Although signed as exit 8 northbound, the interchange is divided into exits 8A and 8B heading southbound. The roadway crosses into Ocean Township and crosses under West Bangs Avenue (CR 17). In Ocean Township, there are exits for Route 66 and Asbury Avenue, Deal Road, and West Park Avenue. Farther north, the highway enters Eatontown.

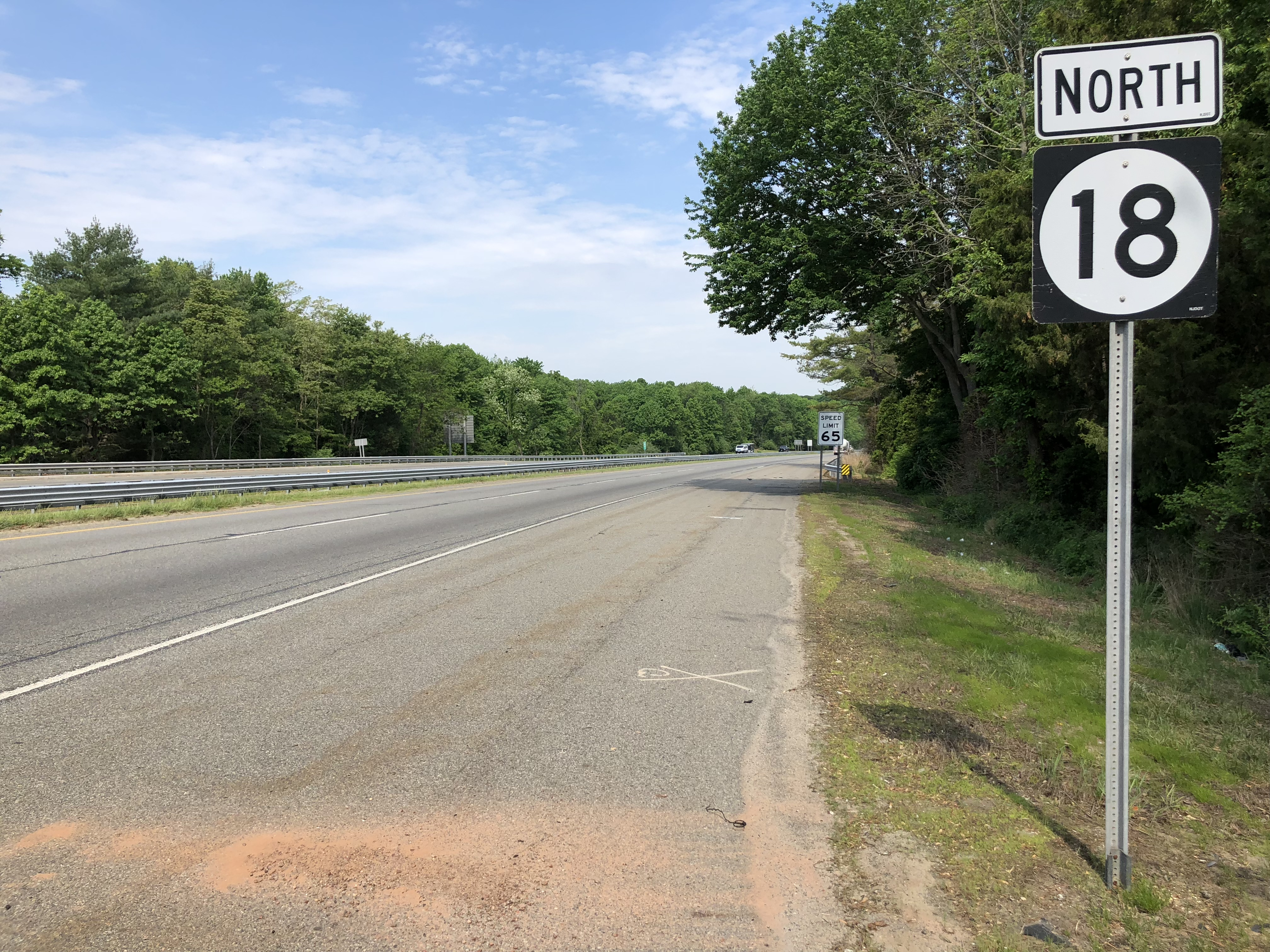
Route 18 northbound past the Route 79 interchange in Marlboro Township

A large interchange near the Naval Weapons Station Earle serves Industrial Way West, Wyckoff Road (CR 547), Route 36, Hope Road (CR 51), the Garden State Parkway, the Tinton Falls interchange (exit 105), and Wayside Road (CR 38). After passing over the Southern Secondary railroad line operated by the Delaware and Raritan River Railroad, the route continues northwestward into Colts Neck Township. The freeway continues to the northwest through wooded land for several miles, crossing over Normandy Road and to the south of the Pebble Creek Golf Club. Exits along this stretch include Route 34, Colts Neck Road (CR 537), Route 79, CR 520, and Tennent Road (CR 3), which connects to Freehold Borough and Marlboro Township.

=== Middlesex County ===
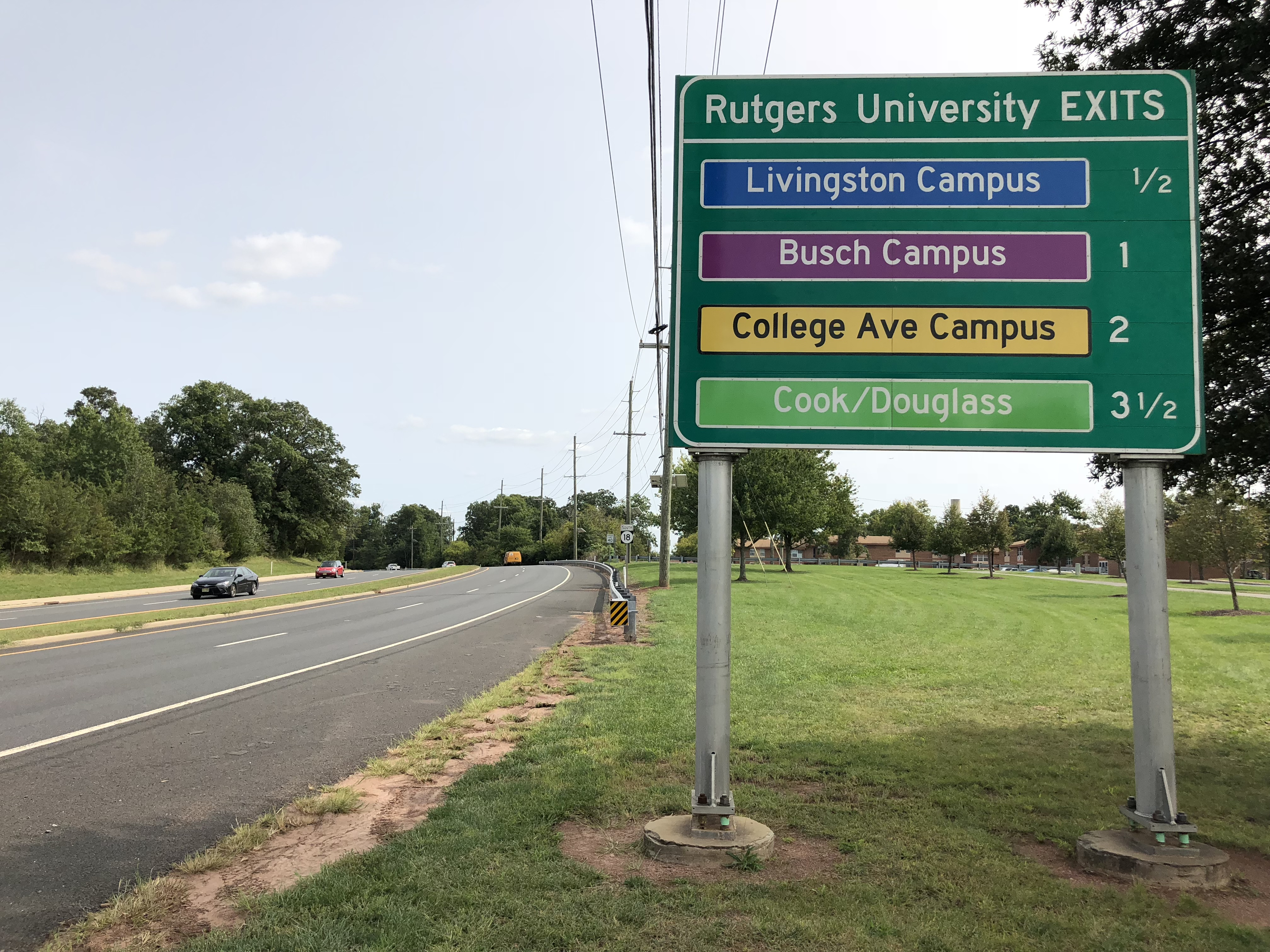
Signage for Rutgers University campuses along Route 18 southbound in Piscataway

After entering Middlesex County, Route 18 continues north as a freeway, entering Old Bridge Township. After interchanging with US 9 (exit 30), the freeway ends, and the route becomes an arterial road through a mostly wooded commercial stretch of Old Bridge. The route crosses several roads in this area. It then passes under Old Bridge-Matawan Road (CR 516 and CR 527), but has no northbound interchange to connect with them; motorists have to travel through a residential area to access these roads. On the southbound side, motorists can use a cloverleaf or Englishtown Road. Route 18 then crosses the South River into East Brunswick and passes over Conrail Shared Assets Operations' (CSAO) Amboy Secondary before interchanging with Main Street (CR 615), which also connects to CR 527.

Route 18 then continues through the heavily developed commercial corridor of East Brunswick, intersecting with Rues Lane (CR 617) and passing near Brunswick Square Mall. After the interchanges with Cranbury Road (CR 535) and Milltown Road (CR 606), Route 18 passes over CSAO's Bonhamtown Industrial Track line and intersects West Ferris Street, West Prospect Street, Tices Lane, and then meets the intersection with Old Bridge Turnpike (CR 527) at Edgeboro Road. Following an intersection with Eggers Street, Route 18 crosses over the New Jersey Turnpike (I-95) at exit 9, becoming a six-lane expressway. The road intersects with Tower Center Boulevard before crossing into New Brunswick at Lawrence Brook.

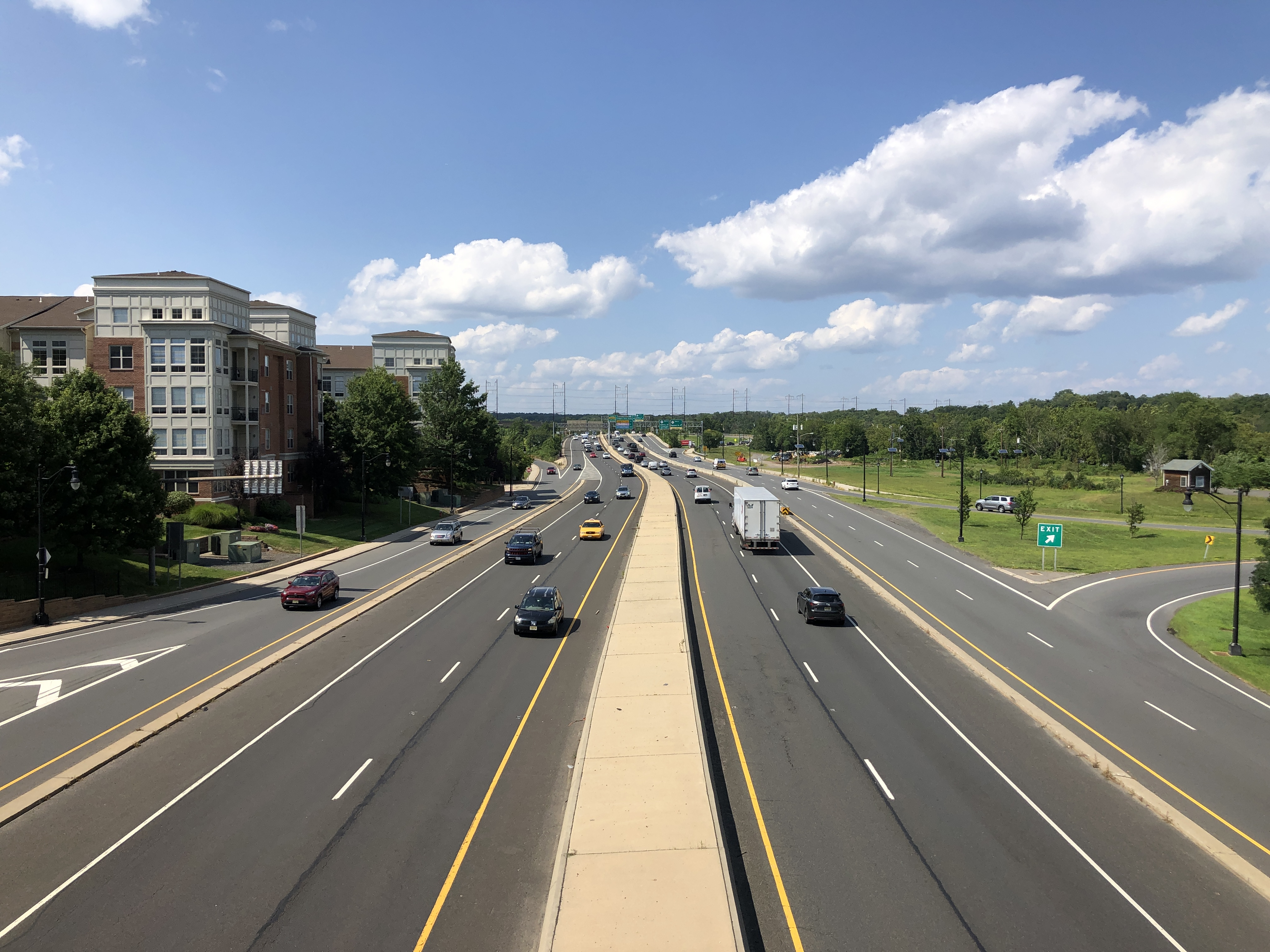
Route 18 northbound at New Street in New Brunswick

The interchange with US 1 is followed by an intersection at Paulus Boulevard before becoming a six-lane freeway and separating into a local–express configuration and paralleling the Raritan River, passing the former New Brunswick city docks. Local exits include George Street (Route 172), the Rutgers University boathouse and Elmer B. Boyd Park, Paul Robeson Boulevard (formerly Commercial Avenue), New Street, and Albany Street (Route 27), after which the express and local lanes merge back together and cross under the Raritan River Bridge carrying Amtrak's Northeast Corridor. The freeway continues with exits for George Street, Rutgers (for access to the College Avenue Campus) and Easton Avenue before exiting New Brunswick on the John A. Lynch Sr. Memorial Bridge over the Raritan River.

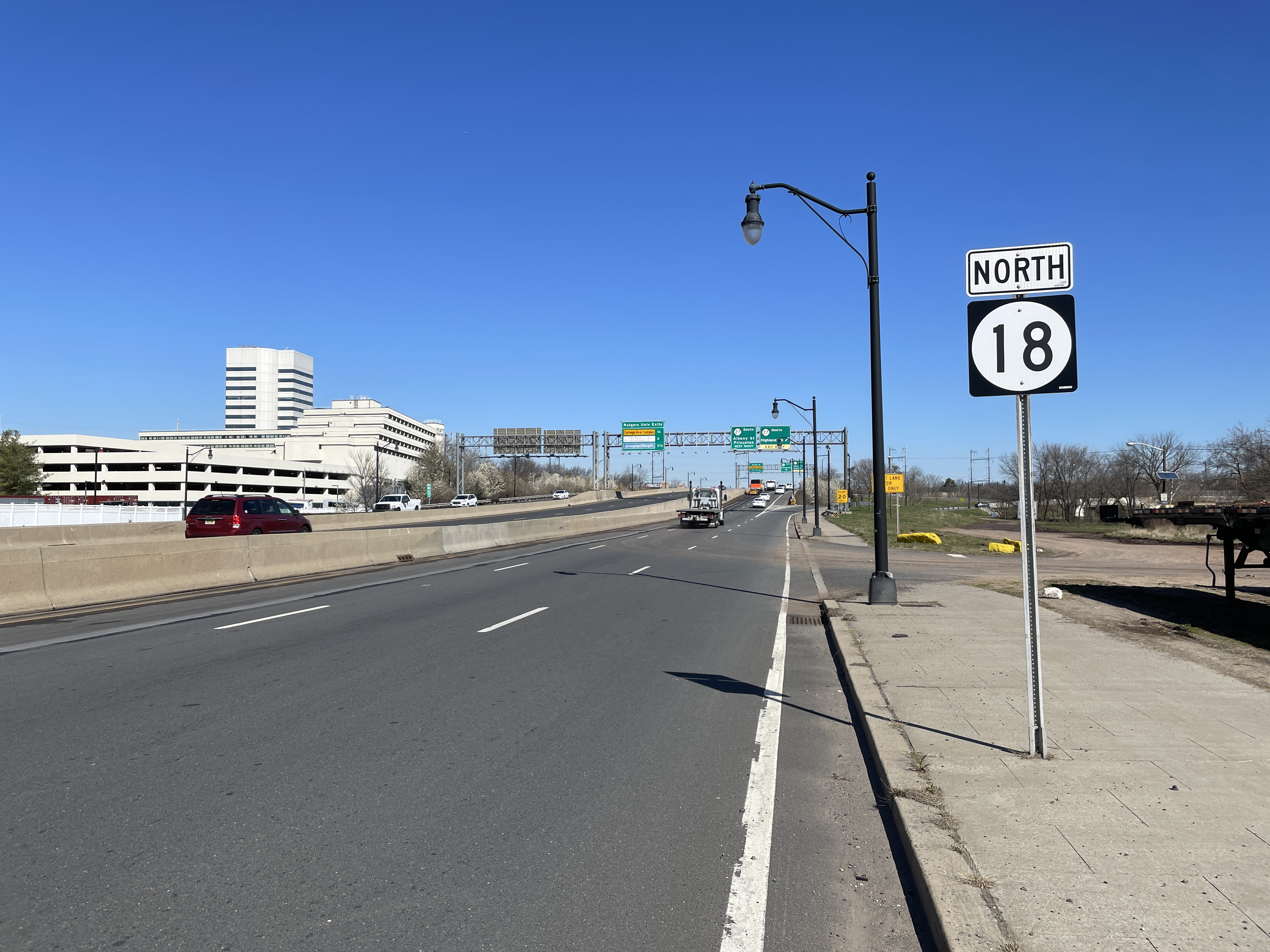
Route 18 northbound past New Street in New Brunswick

The highway then intersects River Road (CR 622), Campus Road (Rutgers' Busch Campus and stadium), Metlars Lane (Rutgers' Livingston Campus and Rutgers Athletic Center), where the route curves to the west and becomes Hoes Lane. As Hoes Lane, Route 18 becomes a four-lane arterial road and passes Resurrection Cemetery of the Diocese of Metuchen, as well as the post office and township hall of Piscataway, before reaching an intersection with Centennial Avenue. Route 18 turns on Centennial Avenue and continues for about 0.3 miles (0.48 km) to a traffic signal for Possumtown Road. From this intersection, Route 18 is considered to exist both on Centennial Avenue and Possumtown Road, and ends in each case at the respective entrance ramps for Interstate 287. (Note: The signage reads "NJ 18" on both Centennial Avenue and Possumtown Road. However, in the straight-line diagrams, the stretch of 0.2 miles (0.32 km) on Possumtown Road is designated as "NJ 18 Spur".)

== History and future ==
=== Designation and southern freeway construction ===
Route S28
- Location: Middlesex–Matawan
- Existed: 1927–1953

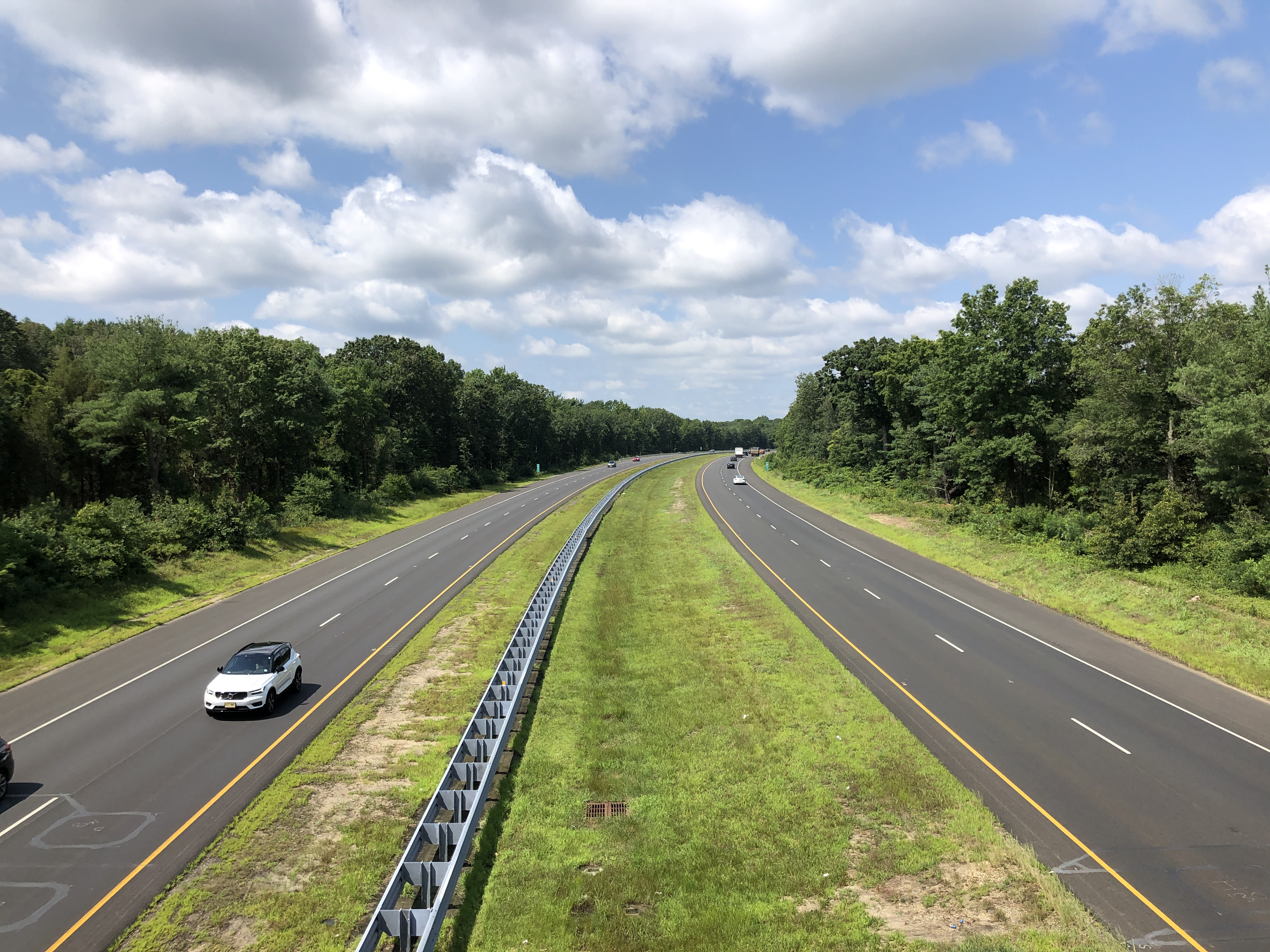
Route 18 northbound in Colts Neck Township

Route 18 partly follows the course of the Middlesex and Matawan Turnpike (commonly called the Old Bridge Turnpike), legislated in 1863 to run from the south branch of the Raritan River to Matawan. The alignment of Route 18 through Middlesex County from Middlesex to Highland Park was first designated in the 1927 designing of a new highway system as State Highway Route S-29, a prefixed spur of New Jersey Route 29 (US 22) through Middlesex County. The route followed Washington Avenue in Middlesex and the River Road in Piscataway until terminating at State Highway Route 27 near the Albany Street Bridge in Highland Park. By the time of the 1927 New Jersey state highway renumbering, the route was re-designated as State Highway Route S-28. This route was a prefixed spur of State Highway Route 28 in Middlesex, following Raritan Avenue and River Road through Piscataway and Highland Park, joining State Highway Route 27 on a concurrency into New Brunswick, and onto George Street in New Brunswick southward. After New Brunswick, Route S-28 continued southward through East Brunswick, Old Bridge and Browntown before terminating at State Highway Route 4 (US 9) in Matawan.

The route was originally designated as an east–west highway, whereas it is now signed north–south. Although Route S-28 was used for the alignment for nearly three decades, the second state highway renumbering in 1953 eliminated the designation, and Route 18 was designated in its place.

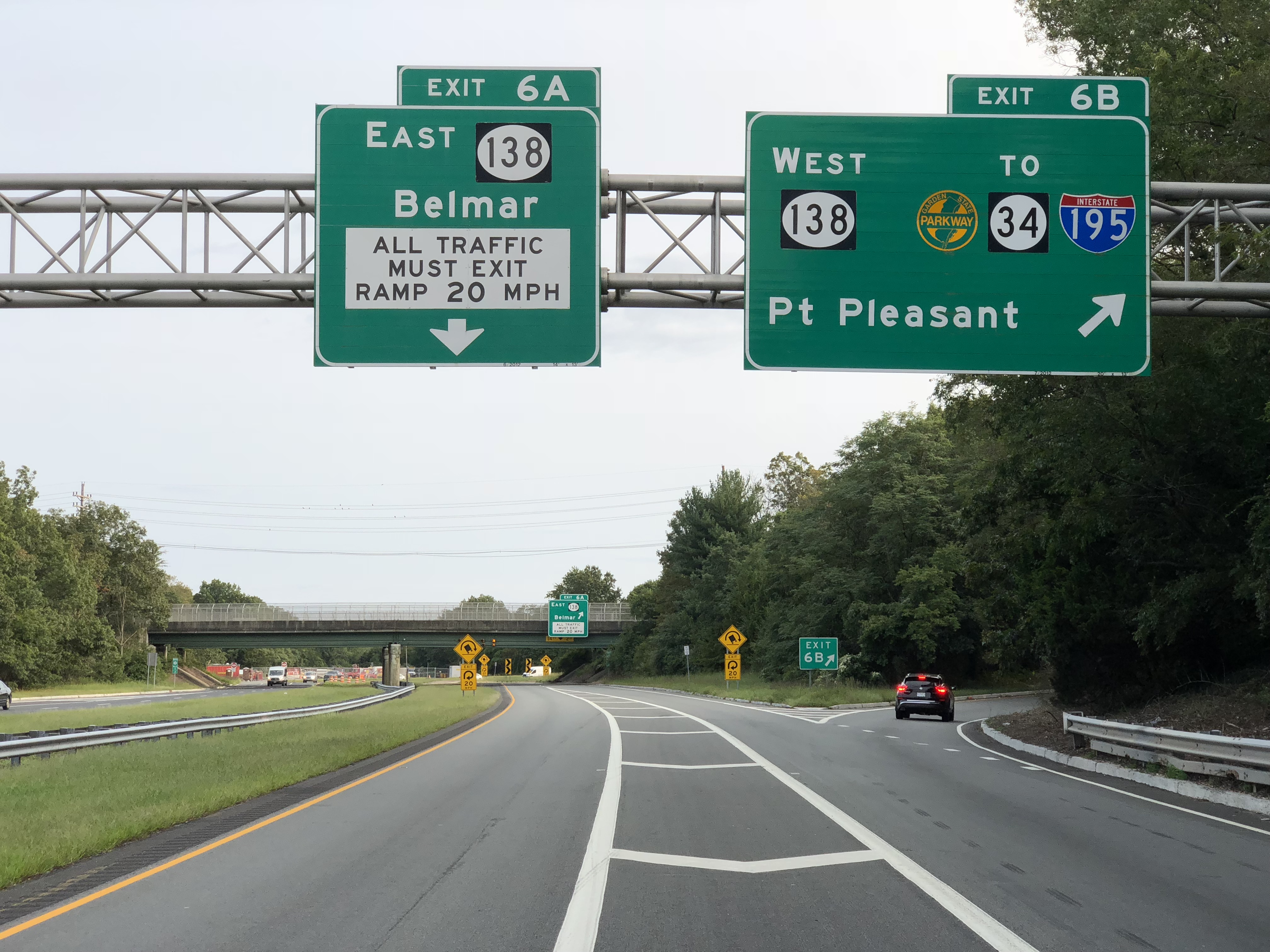
Route 18's southern terminus at Route 138 in Wall Township

During the 1950s, as the New Jersey State Highway Department was drawing out plans for an extensive freeway system, freeways were proposed for Route 18 and nearby Route 35. Route 18's freeway was to begin in Eatontown and head westward to Old Bridge Township along its former alignment prior to the 1953 renumbering, while Route 35 was to be rerouted from its surface alignment and head northward from Seaside Heights to Long Branch on a new freeway. Both plans were endorsed by the Tri-State Transportation Committee in 1962, and the acquisition for the right-of-ways began almost immediately. The freeways combined were to cost $50 million (1962 USD) and be 30 miles (48 km) in total. Both freeways were designed to handle 30,000–50,000 vehicles daily.

The freeway was completed between Route 138 and Route 33 in 1967 and Route 33 and Deal Road in 1969. Following this, the Route 35 freeway was cancelled and it became the part of Route 18 south of Eatontown. In 1974, Route 18 was completed between just south of Normandy Road in Colts Neck Township and US 9. A small portion of the freeway between Obre Road and Normandy Road in Colts Neck Township was finished in 1977. Route 18 was built between Wayside Road and Obre Road in 1978. The final portion of the Route 18 between Deal Road and Wayside Road was finished in 1988.

=== Freeway around New Brunswick ===
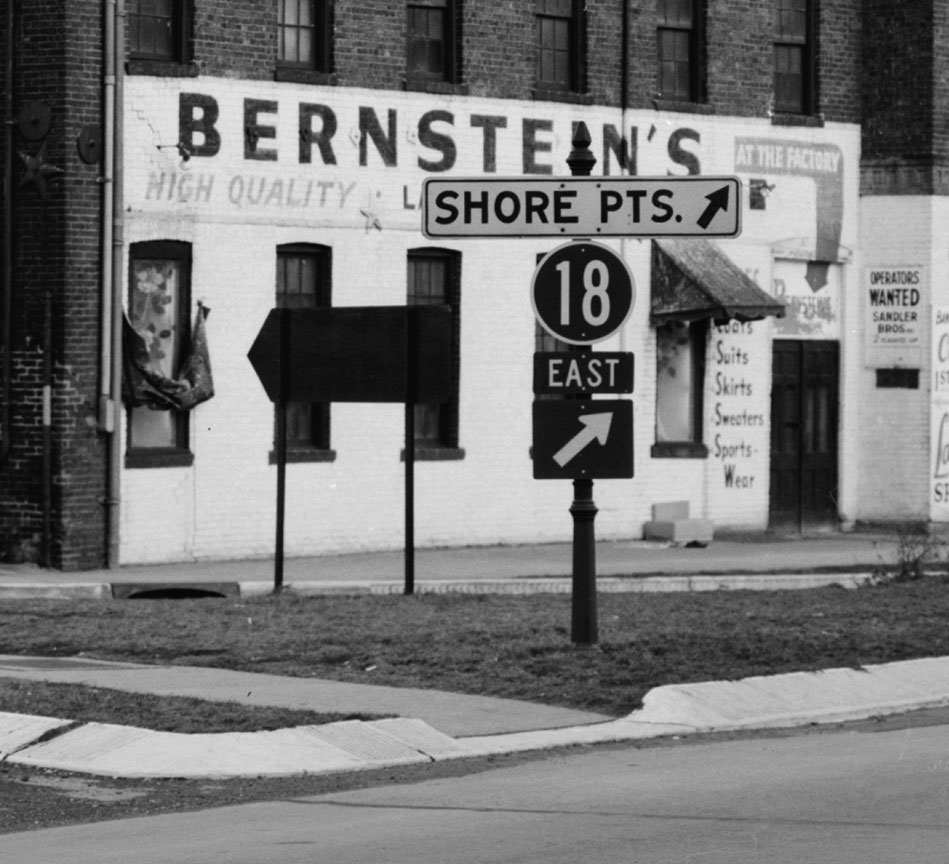
1960 photo of Route 18 sign on Route 27 through New Brunswick. Route 18 is no longer signed east–west.

The proposals for a freeway bypassing New Brunswick began in 1962, when the New Jersey State Highway Department made plans to construct a new freeway from US 1 through New Brunswick to US 22 in Bound Brook. The price tag for construction was $44 million (about $457 million in 2024 dollars) and was to head for 8.3 miles (13.4 km), accessing the Somerset Freeway, I-287 and Route 28 before terminating at US 22. The extension to Bound Brook, however, was canceled in the 1970s because of tight funding.

Construction of a new four-lane bridge across the Raritan River (now the John A. Lynch Memorial Bridge) began in the 1960s, but in 1970, when the environment impact laws came out, construction froze with only three massive piers standing out of the river. Outside of the bridge, there was significant controversy over the abandoned Delaware and Raritan Canal heading through New Brunswick. The new freeway was to supplant the former canal and its thirteenth lock in New Brunswick, abandoned in 1932. The environmentalists and the historic preservationists opposed the freeway extension because of the fears of losing the canal, while companies like Johnson & Johnson supported the new highway for redeveloping New Brunswick.

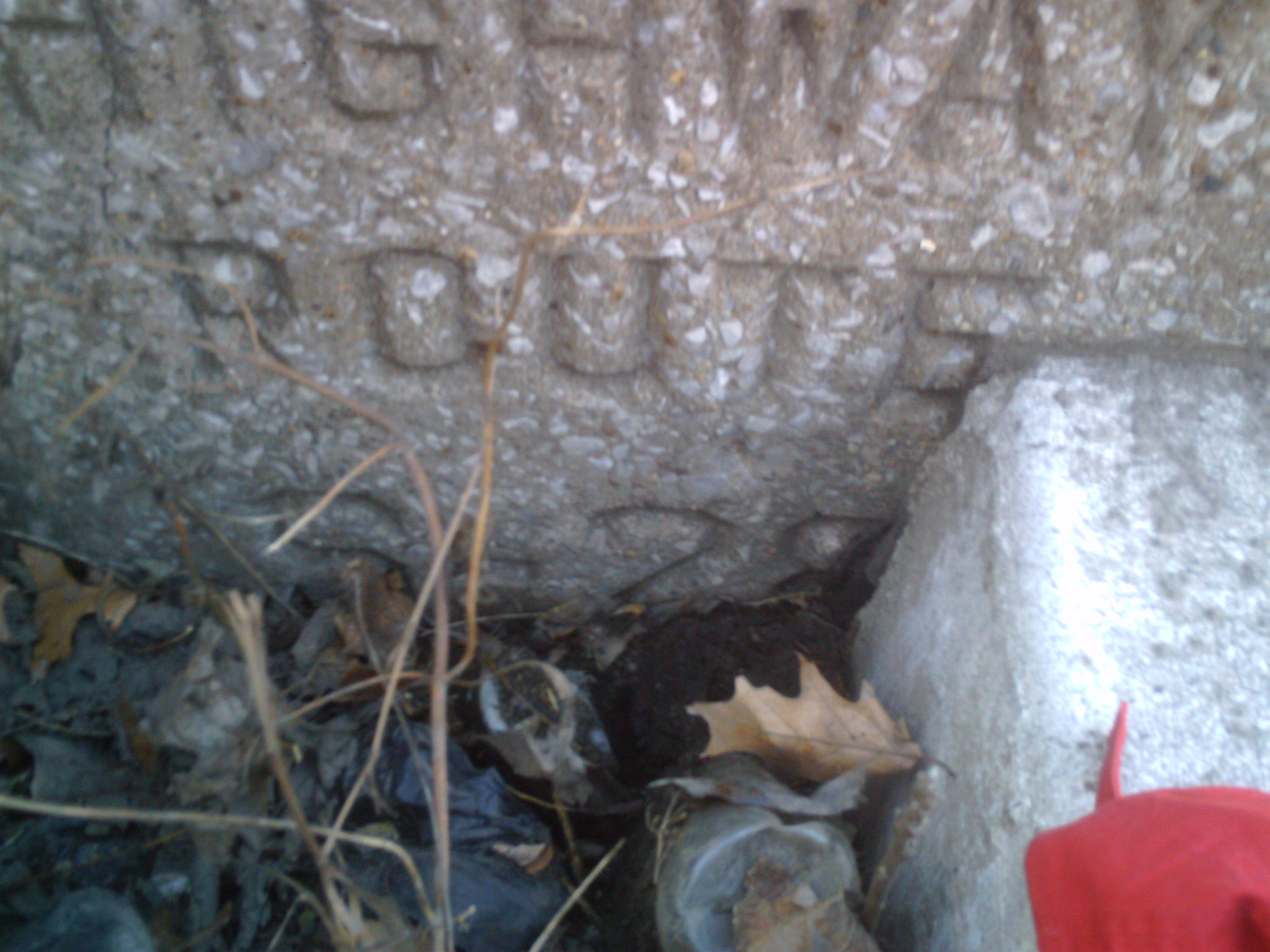
Route S-28 stamp on the side of Route 18 over Westons Mill Pond

In 1977, the newly formed New Jersey Department of Transportation received a federal grant to construct the Route 18 from New Street in New Brunswick, across the Raritan and terminating at CR 514 Spur in Piscataway. This 2.3-mile (3.7 km) portion was completed in 1983 at a cost of $40 million (about $126 million in 2024 dollars), with a finished bridge and freeway through New Brunswick.

In 2005, construction began on a revamped Route 18 freeway through New Brunswick. The rebuild includes local and express lanes from George Street (Route 172) to the interchange with Albany Street (Route 27). Conti Enterprises was hired for the project, which was announced complete in August 2009 at a ceremony by governor Jon Corzine and Stephen Dilts, the commissioner of the New Jersey Department of Transportation. During the construction, the New Street interchange and bridge were demolished and replaced. The area of the Paulus Boulevard intersection was upgraded for accessibility, and a bus stop was installed, but the roadway southbound is still three lanes at the traffic light. In adjacent Elmer Boyd Park a new entranceway and amphitheatre were added.

=== Extension through Piscataway and to Brielle ===
==== Piscataway ====
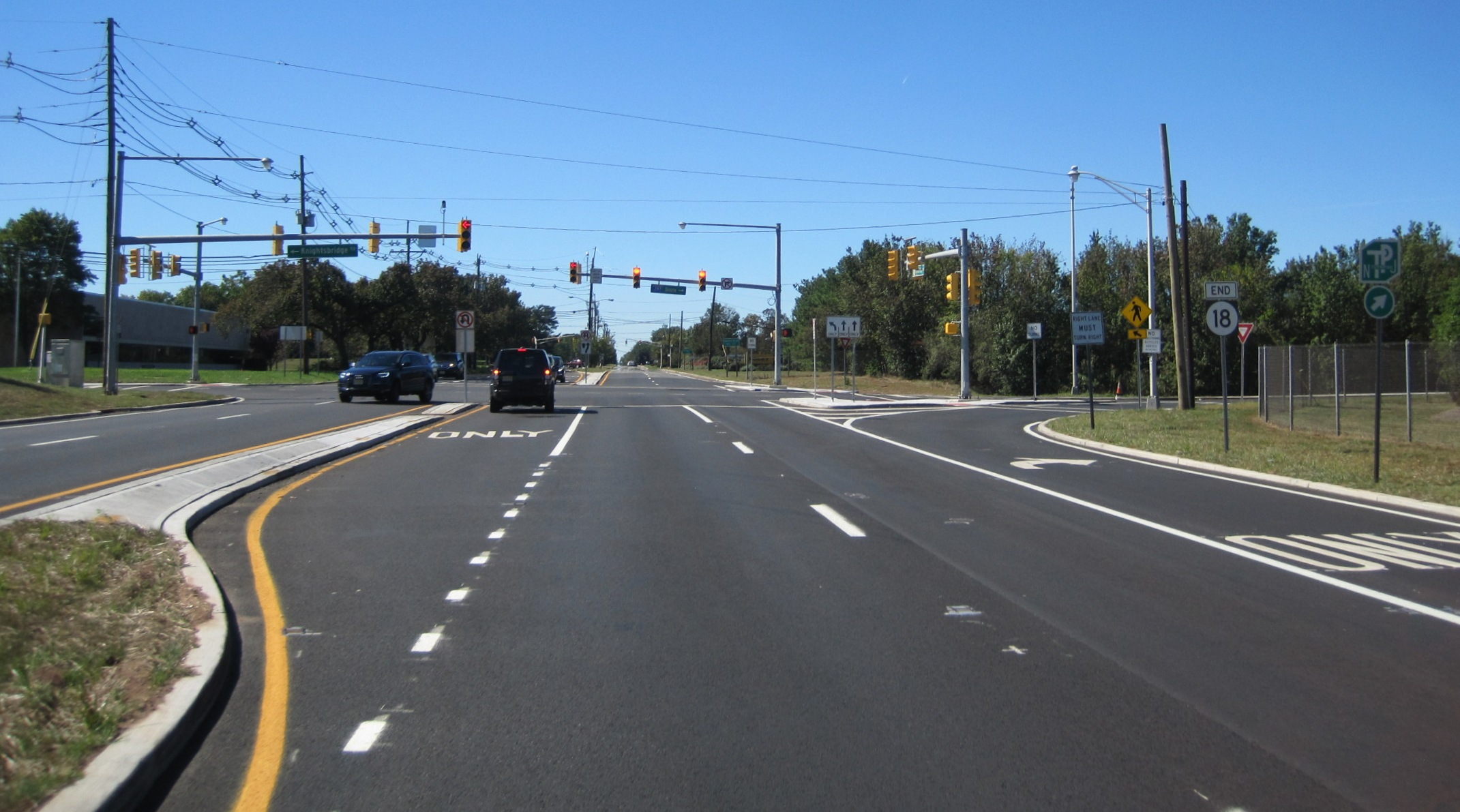
End Route 18 signage along Centennial Avenue at Knightsbridge Road and the southbound I-287 on and off ramps

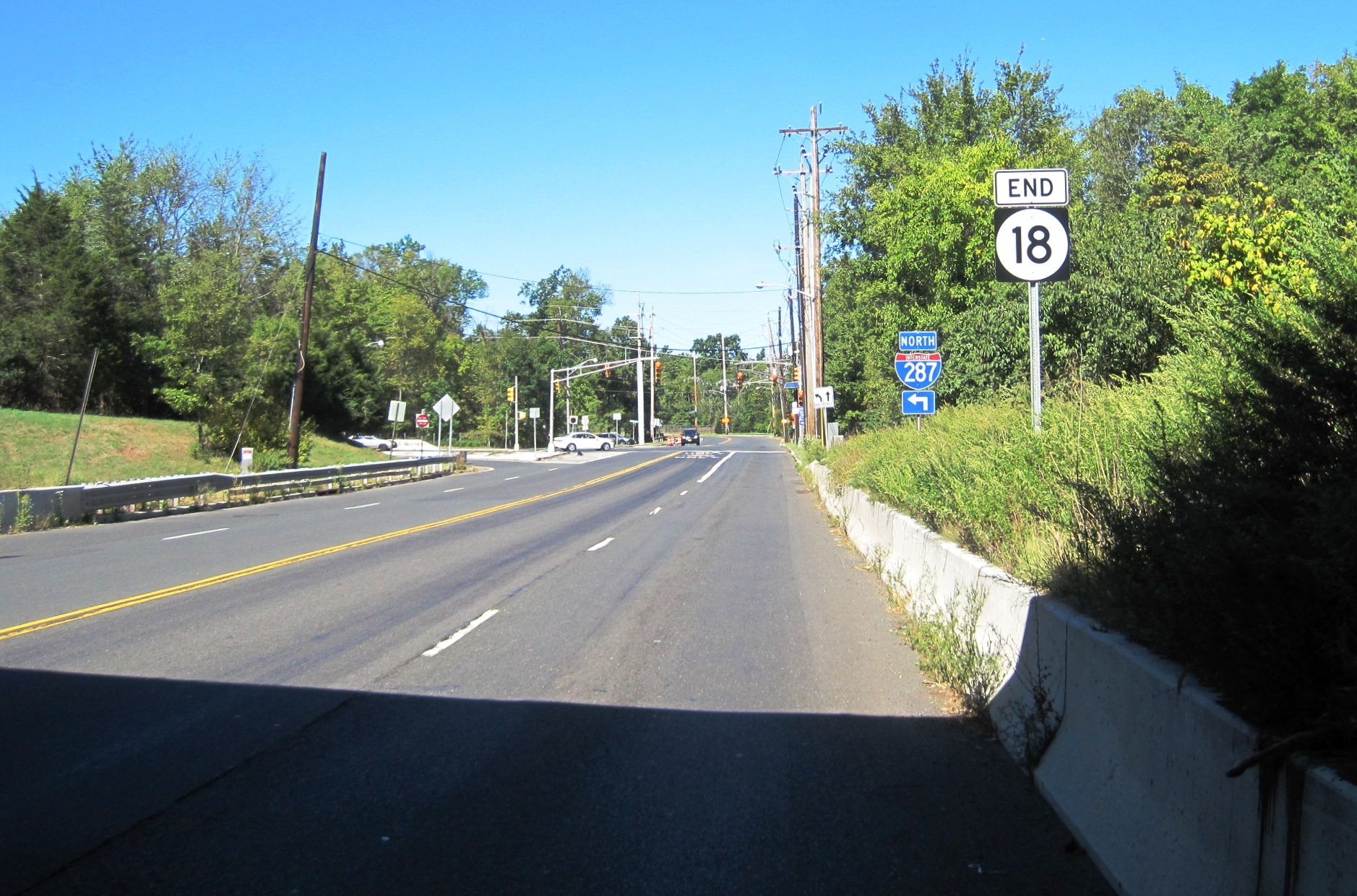
End Route 18 signage along Possumtown Road at the northbound I-287 on and off ramps

Two branches of Route 18 ending at I-287's exit 8

In 2001, the New Jersey Department of Transportation approved construction of extending the Route 18 Freeway northward from River Road (CR 622, former CR 514 Spur) in Piscataway to a new arterial on the existing Hoes Lane in the Rutgers University campuses. Construction of this segment, designated as Section 2A, built a partial cloverleaf interchange to River Road (CR 622), a trumpet interchange to Frelinghuysen Avenue (the access to Busch Campus) and a partial cloverleaf interchange to Metlars Lane (CR 609) and Davidson Road. The state acquired 12 homes along the existing Metlars Lane and 30 acres (120,000 m^{2}) of land from Rutgers to build the extension. The project cost the state $85 million (2004 USD).

The New Jersey Department of Transportation planned the extension to I-287 in Piscataway, by upgrading Hoes Lane's arterial boulevard and its 20 intersections to standards, eliminating and upgrading several traffic lights. On February 15, 2012, the New Jersey Department of Transportation broke ground on the project, which was completed in mid-2016. Following the completion of the project, Route 18 turns off Hoes Lane at Centennial Avenue, follows Centennial Avenue to Possumtown Road, and terminates at I-287 exit 8.

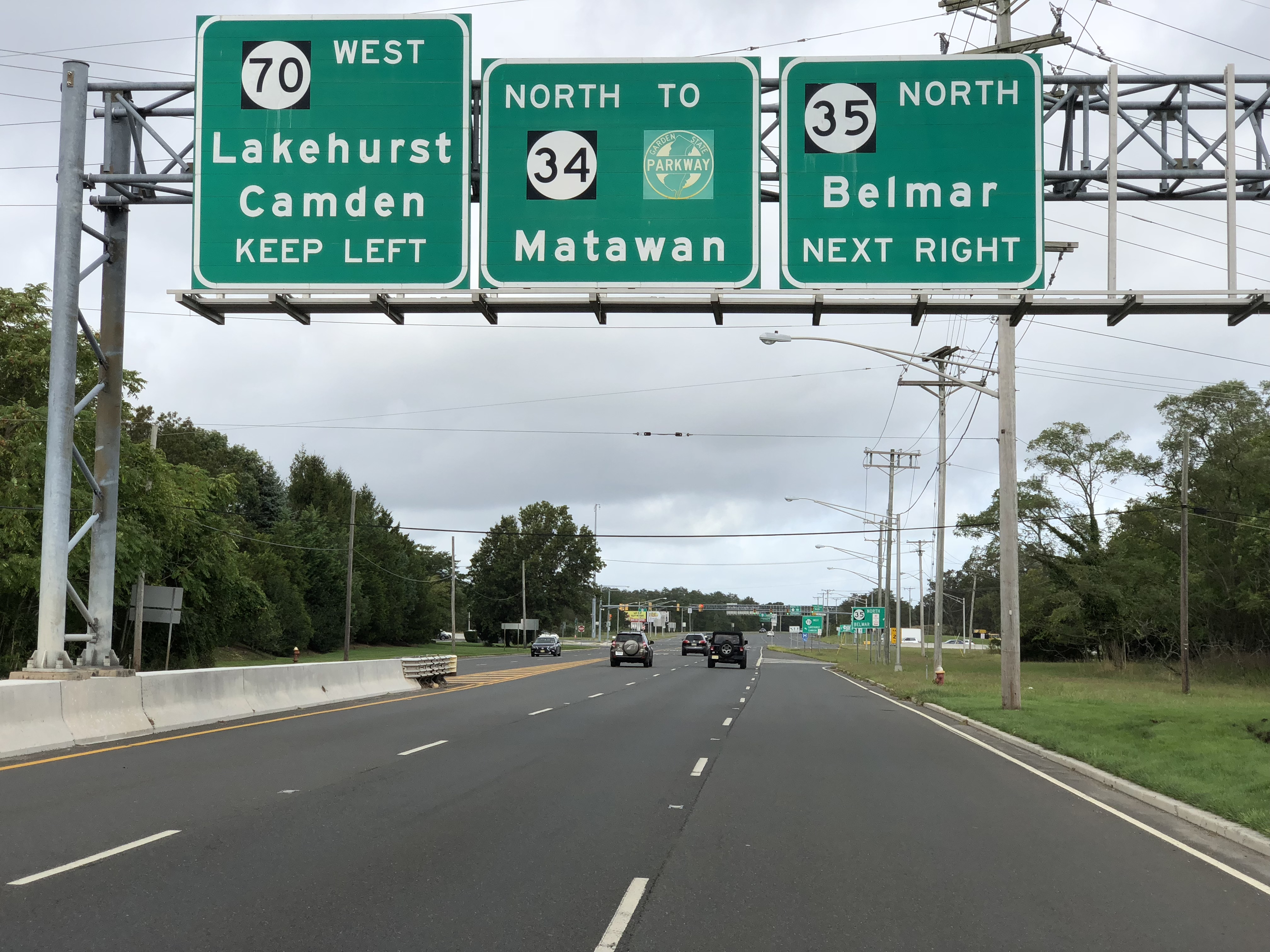
Route 35 northbound approaching the former Brielle Circle, which was to be the southern terminus of Route 18

==== Brielle ====
There has been scrutiny about the stub end at Exit 6A for Route 138 that was to be a part of an extension of the freeway for its final five miles (8 km) from Route 138 to the Brielle Circle. Some of the right-of-way that was acquired in the 1960s for the Route 35 freeway were transformed into a multi-use trail for bicycles and other vehicles to link the Wall Township Municipal Complex to the existing Edgar Felix Bikeway that runs from Manasquan to Allaire State Park. In 2001, the Brielle Circle was replaced with a new four-approach interchange between Route 35, Route 34 and Route 70, but the project included no hint of the Route 18 Extension. NJDOT is in planning to create a Park & Ride at the southern terminus of the Route 18 freeway. It will be placed along the four lane right of way just south of Route 138. Residents are in opposition to this proposal for fear of loitering and vandalism that may accompany the parking lot.

=== New exit ramp in Old Bridge Township ===
Construction was slated for the interchange with County Routes 516 and 527 in Old Bridge Township as there is no way to access either of them without driving through a residential area off Route 18. The traffic flow along CR 516 (Old Bridge into Matawan) and 527 (Old Bridge into Englishtown–Manalapan Township) has increased significantly in the past ten years which called for the exit ramp off Route 18. The Old Bridge improvements include adding inside shoulders and widening County Routes 516 and 527. A signalized ramp is to be added for access to County Routes 516 and 527. Subsequently, CR 516's intersection with Old Matawan Road is to be relocated. The project would cost over $28 million and was slated to begin in 2009 and to end in 2010. As of the end of 2009 the large project was put on hold because of the lack of funds and the economic situation. Demolition was completed in 2009 on Marlboro Road, taking down several residential houses and along Old Matawan Road and CR 516 and taking down an old gas station in preparing for the project. There is no new date released by the New Jersey Department of Transportation in when construction will begin. The CR 516 bridge over Route 18 had since been replaced in 2016 with no interchange improvements.

== Major intersections ==
Exit numbers and mileposts are based on the originally planned southern terminus of Route 18 at Route 34, Route 35, and Route 70 at the former Brielle Circle that includes the 5.14-mile (8.27 km) unbuilt section from Brielle to Route 138.

County	Location	mi	km	Exit	Destinations	Notes
Monmouth	Wall Township	5.14	8.27	6A-B	Route 138 to I-195 west / G.S. Parkway / Route 34 – Belmar, Point Pleasant	Southern terminus; signed as exits 6A (east) and 6B (west); former Route 38
Monmouth	Wall Township	5.72	9.21	6C	Monmouth Boulevard	Northbound exit and southbound entrance
Monmouth	Wall Township	6.82	10.98	7	Brighton Avenue / Marconi Road – Shark River Hills, Glendola	Signed as exits 7A (east) and 7B (west) southbound
Monmouth	Neptune Township	8.28	13.33	8	Route 33 – Neptune, Freehold	Signed as exits 8A (east) and 8B (west) southbound
Monmouth	Neptune Township	9.84	15.84	10	Route 66 – Asbury Park, Freehold	Signed as exits 10A (east) and 10B (west)
Monmouth	Ocean Township	11.37	18.30	11	Deal Road – Wayside	Northbound exit and southbound entrance; signed as exits 11A (east) and 11B (west)
Monmouth	Ocean Township	12.07	19.42	12	West Park Avenue – Oakhurst, Wayside	Southbound exit and northbound entrance; signed as exits 12A (east) and 12B (west)
Monmouth	Eatontown	13.46	21.66	13A	CR 547 south to G.S. Parkway – Wayside	Northbound exit and southbound entrance
Monmouth	Eatontown	13.82	22.24	13B	Route 36 east – Eatontown, Long Branch	Access to Fort Monmouth, Monmouth University, Monmouth Mall, and Monmouth Medical Center
Monmouth	Tinton Falls	13.92	22.40	13A	Hope Road	No northbound exit; access via CR 51
Monmouth	Tinton Falls	14.40– 14.51	23.17– 23.35	15	G.S. Parkway south / Wayside Rd	No northbound access to GSP/Wayside north; signed as exits 15A (GSP/Wayside north) and 15B (Wayside south); access via CR 38
Monmouth	Colts Neck Township	19.02	30.61	19	Route 34 – Matawan, Point Pleasant	Signed as exits 19A (north) and 19B (south); access to Colts Neck Business District
Monmouth	Colts Neck Township	22.31	35.90	22	CR 537 – Colts Neck, Freehold	Signed as exits 22A (east) and 22B (west)
Monmouth	Marlboro Township	25.20	40.56	25	Route 79 – Matawan, Freehold	Signed as exits 25A (north) and 25B (south)
Monmouth	Marlboro Township	28.60	46.03		Morganville	Southbound exit and northbound entrance; access via CR 3 north
Monmouth	Marlboro Township	28.80	46.35	29	CR 520 – Tennent, Red Bank, Morganville	CR 3 not signed
Middlesex	Old Bridge Township	30.35	48.84	30	US 9 north – The Amboys, New York (NB) US 9 south – Freehold (SB)	Same-directional access only
Middlesex	Old Bridge Township			Northern end of freeway section		
Middlesex	Old Bridge Township	34.41	55.38		CR 516 east – Matawan	Southbound exit and northbound entrance; western terminus of CR 516; interchange
Middlesex	Old Bridge Township	34.41	55.38		CR 527 south – Englishtown	Southbound exit and northbound entrance; interchange
Middlesex	East Brunswick	34.90	56.17		To CR 527 north / Main Street – Spotswood, The Amboys	Interchange; access via CR 615
Middlesex	East Brunswick	37.14	59.77		CR 535 (Cranbury Road) – South River, Cranbury	Interchange
Middlesex	East Brunswick	37.33	60.08		Milltown Road – South River, Milltown	Cloverleaf interchange; access via CR 606
Middlesex	East Brunswick	38.89	62.59		CR 527 south (Old Bridge Turnpike) / Edgeboro Road – East Brunswick, South River	Southern end of unsigned CR 527 concurrency
Middlesex	East Brunswick	39.55	63.65		Eggers Street / Kennedy Boulevard	Partial interchange
Middlesex	East Brunswick	39.94	64.28	Southern end of limited-access section		
Middlesex	East Brunswick	39.94	64.28		I-95 Toll / N.J. Turnpike	Exit 9 on I-95 / Turnpike
Middlesex	New Brunswick	40.61	65.36		US 1 – Newark, Trenton	Partial cloverleaf interchange
Middlesex	New Brunswick	41.41	66.64		Route 172 to Route 27 – Cook/Douglass Campus, Highland Park	Northern end of CR 527 concurrency; eastern terminus of Route 172; no southbound exit
Middlesex	New Brunswick	41.75– 41.96	67.19– 67.53		New Street – Arts and Business District Paul Robeson Boulevard	Paul Robeson Boulevard is formerly Commercial Avenue
Middlesex	New Brunswick	42.29	68.06		Route 27 (Albany Street) – Princeton, Highland Park	Northbound exit and southbound entrance
Middlesex	New Brunswick	42.89	69.02		George Street – College Avenue Campus	Northbound exit and southbound entrance; access via CR 672
Middlesex	New Brunswick	43.20– 43.50	69.52– 70.01		To Route 27 south / George Street – College Avenue Campus, New Brunswick	Southbound exit and northbound entrance
Middlesex	New Brunswick	43.20– 43.50	69.52– 70.01		To CR 527 (Easton Avenue) – South Bound Brook	Northbound exit and southbound entrance
Middlesex	Raritan River	43.58	70.14	John A. Lynch, Sr. Memorial Bridge		
Middlesex	Piscataway	43.86	70.59		River Road – Piscataway, Highland Park	Access via CR 622
Middlesex	Piscataway	44.28	71.26		Campus Road – Busch Campus, Rutgers Stadium	
Middlesex	Piscataway	44.70	71.94		Metlars Lane – Rutgers RAC, Livingston Campus Davidson Road – Rutgers RAC, Livingston Campus	Access via CR 609; northbound signage Access via CR 609; southbound signage
Middlesex	Piscataway	44.70	71.94	Northern end of limited-access section		
Middlesex	Piscataway	47.74– 47.92	76.83– 77.12		I-287	Northern terminus; exit 8 on I-287; access via Centennial Avenue/Possumtown Road
1.000 mi = 1.609 km; 1.000 km = 0.621 mi: Concurrency terminus; Incomplete access; Tolled
