= Glendola Reservoir =

- Location within New Jersey Location within the United States
- Location: Glendola, New Jersey
- Coordinates: 40°11′37″N 74°05′00″W
- Type: reservoir

The Glendola Reservoir is a reservoir in the Glendola section of Wall Township in Monmouth County, New Jersey. It was built in 1965. The water from the Glendola Reservoir is pumped to the Swimming River Reservoir where it is treated. The Glendola Reservoir is managed by New Jersey American Water Company and provides drinking water for residents of Monmouth County.

There are two possible sources for the Glendola Reservoir, the Shark River and Manasquan River, the selection of source is controlled by the New Jersey American Water company as neither river flows into the reservoir and all water must be pumped to the basin.

This Reservoir is completely restricted to any public activity.
