= Glendola, New Jersey =

Populated place in Monmouth County, New Jersey, US

- Unincorporated community
- Location in Monmouth County. Inset: Location of county within the state of New Jersey Glendola (New Jersey) Glendola (the United States)
- Coordinates: 40°11′27″N 74°04′37″W
- Country: United States
- State: New Jersey
- County: Monmouth
- Township: Wall
- Elevation: 105 ft (32 m)
- GNIS feature ID: 876632

Glendola is an unincorporated community located within Wall Township in Monmouth County, in the U.S. state of New Jersey. It is the location of the Glendola Reservoir. Most of the area consists of single-family residences along numerous streets throughout the settlement. The main east–west road through Glendola is Belmar Boulevard (County Route 18) while access to the nearby Route 18 freeway is provided via Brighton Avenue.
