= List of Interstate Highways in New Jersey =

- Standard route signs in New Jersey
- Interstate Highways highlighted in red

Highway names
- Interstates: Interstate X (I-X)
- US Highways: U.S. Route X (US X)
- State: Route X

System links
- New Jersey State Highway Routes; Interstate; US; State; Scenic Byways

There are ten Interstate Highways in New Jersey, including four primary routes and six auxiliary routes. The longest of these is Interstate 95 (I-95), which runs for 89.22 miles (143.59 km) from Florence Township to Fort Lee. The shortest Interstate in New Jersey is I-278, which runs for 2 miles (3.2 km) from Linden to Elizabeth before crossing into Staten Island, New York.

Number	Length (mi)	Length (km)	Southern or western terminus	Northern or eastern terminus	Formed	Removed	Notes
I-76	3.08	4.96	I-76 in Camden	I-295 / Route 42 in Bellmawr	1964	current	
I-78	67.83	109.16	I-78 on the Interstate 78 Toll Bridge in Phillipsburg	I-78 in the Holland Tunnel in Jersey City	1956	current	
I-80	68.54	110.30	I-80 on the Delaware Water Gap Toll Bridge in Hardwick Township	I-95 in Teaneck	1956	current	
I-95	89.22	143.59	I-95 on the Delaware River–Turnpike Toll Bridge in Florence Township	I-95 / US 1 / US 9 on the George Washington Bridge in Fort Lee	1956	current	Includes main segment and Western Spur of the New Jersey Turnpike
I-195	34.17	54.99	I-295 / Route 29 in Hamilton Township	Route 34 / Route 138 / G.S. Parkway in Wall Township	1968	current	
I-278	2.00	3.22	US 1-9 in Linden	I-278 on the Goethals Bridge in Elizabeth	1961	current	
I-280	17.85	28.73	I-80 in Parsippany-Troy Hills	I-95 / N.J. Turnpike in Kearny	1958	current	
I-287	67.54	108.70	Route 440 / I-95 / N.J. Turnpike in Edison Township	I-87 / I-287 / NY 17 / New York Thruway in Mahwah	1961	current	
I-295	76.56	123.21	I-295 / US 40 in Pennsville Township	I-295 on the Scudder Falls Bridge in Ewing Township	1958	current	
I-495	3.45	5.55	I-95 / N.J. Turnpike in Secaucus	NY 495 in the Lincoln Tunnel in Weehawken	1959	1986	Now Route 495
I-676	4.75	7.64	I-76 near the Walt Whitman Bridge in Gloucester City	I-676 on the Benjamin Franklin Bridge in Camden	1964	current	
I-695	3.4	5.5	I-95 in Somerset	I-287 in Somerset	—	—	Never built
I-895	6.4	10.3	I-895 at the Pennsylvania state line in Burlington	I-295 in Burlington	1968	1981	Never built
Former
