= County Road 516 =

County Road 516 or County Route 516 may refer to:

- County Road 516 (Brevard County, Florida)
- County Route 516 (New Jersey)
