= List of county routes in Monmouth County, New Jersey =

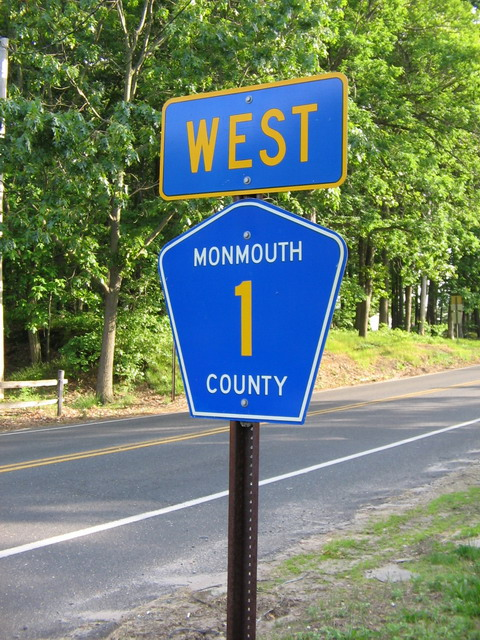
Typical Monmouth County road signage, depicting County Route 1 going westbound

The following is a list of county routes in Monmouth County in the U.S. state of New Jersey. For more information on the county route system in New Jersey as a whole, including its history, see County routes in New Jersey.

== History ==
In the 1937 renumbering of Monmouth County roads, numbers 1 through 5 were reserved for the longer, "cross-county" routes; those numbered 6 and above were to be more local in nature. County Route 1 was designated to run from the Mercer County line via Freehold and Eatontown to the Long Branch city limits. With the establishment of the 500 Series of county routes, CR 1 was superseded by CR 524 from the Mercer County line to Smithburg, and CR 537 from Smithburg to the Long Branch boundary. The present CR 1 was formed when part of CR 3 was separated from the balance of CR 3 with the 1952 establishment of CR 527 as part of the 500 Series routes. Since the CR 1 designation was available, that portion of CR 3 between CR 527 and CR 571 was re-designated as CR 1.

== 500-series county routes ==
In addition to those listed below, the following 500-series county routes serve Monmouth County:

- CR 516, CR 516 Spur, CR 520, CR 522, CR 524, CR 524A, CR 524 Spur, CR 526, CR 526 Spur, CR 527, CR 527A, CR 537, CR 539, CR 539 Alt, CR 547, CR 549, CR 571

== Other county routes ==
Route	Length (mi)	Length (km)	From	Via	To	Notes
CR 1	6.54	10.53	Perrineville Road (CR 571) and North Rochdale Avenue (CR 571) in Millstone Township	Perrineville Road, Sweetmans Lane	Sweetmans Lane (CR 527) and Smithburg Road (CR 527/CR 527A on the Millstone/Manalapan township line	
CR 2	2.07	3.33	Corlies Avenue (Route 33) on the Neptune Township/Neptune City border	Oxford Way, 6th Avenue, Brinley Avenue	Ocean Avenue (CR 18) in Bradley Beach	
CR 3	13.21	21.26	Millhurst Road (CR 527) in Manalapan Township	Main Street, Tennent Road, Lloyd Road, Nappi Place	Route 35 in Keyport	
CR 3A	1.20	1.93	Baird Road in Millstone Township	Conover Road	Route 33 in Millstone Township	Decommissioned on June 1, 1971
CR 4 (1)	1.74	2.80	Boundary Road and Vanderburg Road on the Marlboro/Colts Neck township line	Crine Road	Conover Road (CR 4) in Colts Neck	Formerly extended west to Route 79
CR 4 (2)	9.26	14.90	End of the county maintenance along Conover Road in Colts Neck Township	Conover Road, South Street, Holmdel Road, Main Street, Broad Street	1st Street (CR 6) in Keyport	
CR 4A	2.10	3.38	CR 520 on the Marlboro/Colts Neck township line	Conover Road	Route 79 in Marlboro Township	Decommissioned on May 25, 1989
CR 5	1.36	2.19	Route 35 in Neptune City	Steiner Avenue, Atkins Avenue	Atkins Avenue on the Neptune Township/Asbury Park border	
CR 6 (1)	1.18	1.90	Route 35 in Aberdeen Township	Amboy Avenue, West Front Street	Broad Street (CR 4) and East Front Street in Keyport	
CR 6 (2)	0.36	0.58	West 4th Street (CR 516) and Broadway (CR 516) in Keyport	Broadway	West Front Street (CR 6) in Keyport	
CR 6 (3)	0.91	1.46	1st Street (CR 6) in Keyport	Stone Road	Route 36 on the Hazlet/Union Beach border	
CR 6 (4)	1.11	1.79	Broad Street (CR 4) in Keyport	1st Street, Broadway	Florence Avenue (CR 39) on the Hazlet/Union Beach border	
CR 6A (1)	1.32	2.12	Cliffwood Road (CR 689) at the Middlesex County line in Aberdeen Township	Cliffwood Avenue	Route 35 in Aberdeen Township	
CR 6A (2)	1.61	2.59	Cliffwood Avenue (CR 6A) in Matawan	Cross Road, Ravine Drive	Main Street (CR 516 Spur) in Matawan	
CR 7 (1)	2.81	4.52	Route 35 in Middletown Township	Palmer Avenue, Main Street, Church Street, Monroe Avenue	Route 36 in Hazlet	
CR 7 (2)	0.61	0.98	Main Street (CR 7) in Keansburg	Port Monmouth Road	Atlantic Avenue on the Keansburg/Middletown Township border	
CR 8	4.22	6.79	Route 36 in Atlantic Highlands	First Avenue, Ocean Boulevard, Orchard Avenue, Linden Avenue, Waterwich Avenue, Bay Avenue	Route 36 in Highlands	
CR 8A	3.55	5.71	Rumson Road (CR 520) and Tuxedo Road in Rumson	Bingham Avenue, Oceanic Bridge, Locust Point Road, Locust Avenue, Valley Drive East	Route 36 in Atlantic Highlands	
CR 8B	1.02	1.64	Valley Drive East (CR 8A), Monmouth Avenue, and Oakdale Run in Middletown Township	Navesink Avenue	Route 36 and Orchard Street in Middletown Township	
CR 9	5.27	8.48	Monmouth Beach/Long Branch border	Ocean Avenue	Sea Bright/Middletown Township border in Sandy Hook	Decommissioned on October 17, 1972, and replaced with Route 36
CR 10	5.21	8.38	Hubbard Avenue (CR 12) in Middletown Township	West Front Street, East Front Street, River Road, West River Road, East River Road	Ridge Road (CR 34) in Rumson	
CR 11 (1)	0.83	1.34	Broad Street (CR 520) and Pinckney Road (CR 520) in Red Bank	Broad Street	Front Street (CR 10) in Red Bank	Maintained by Red Bank Borough north of Harding Road (CR 34)
CR 11 (2)	3.34	5.38	Port Au Peck Avenue in Oceanport	Oceanport Avenue, Branch Avenue	Harding Road (CR 34) and Hudson Avenue in Red Bank	
CR 11 (3)	1.09	1.75	Broadway (CR 547) in West Long Branch	Oceanport Avenue	Port Au Peck Avenue and East Main Street in Oceanport	
CR 12	4.19	6.74	Red Hill Road (CR 52) and Van Schoick Road (CR 52) in Holmdel Township	Dwight Road, Nut Swamp Road, Hubbard Avenue	West Front Street (CR 10) in Middletown Township	
CR 12A	4.40	7.08	Hubbard Avenue (CR 12) and Nut Swamp Road (CR 12) in Middletown Township	Navesink River Road	Locust Point Road (CR 8A) in Middletown Township	
CR 13	3.06	4.92	Broad Street (Route 35) in Shrewsbury	Shrewsbury Avenue, Rector Place	Route 35 in Red Bank	
CR 13A	3.76	6.05	Tinton Avenue (CR 537) in Tinton Falls	Sycamore Avenue	Branch Avenue (CR 11) and Oceanport Avenue (CR 11) in Little Silver	
CR 13B (1)	1.09	1.75	Branch Avenue (CR 11) and Oceanport Avenue (CR 11) in Little Silver	Willow Drive, Prospect Avenue	Rumson Road (CR 520) in Little Silver	
CR 13B (2)	0.30	0.48	Prospect Avenue (CR 13B) in Little Silver	Church Street	Rumson Road (CR 520) in Little Silver	
CR 14	3.20	5.15	Green Grove Road and Hope Road on the Ocean Township/Tinton Falls line	West Park Avenue	Monmouth Road (CR 15) in Ocean Township	
CR 15	5.19	8.35	Main Street (Route 71) and Deal Lake Drive (Route 71) in Asbury Park	Main Street, Grassmere Avenue, Westra Street, Monmouth Road, Locust Avenue	Broadway (CR 547) in West Long Branch	
CR 16	6.22	10.01	Naval Weapons Station Earle in Colts Neck Township	Asbury Avenue	Main Street (Route 71) in Asbury Park	
CR 17 (1)	1.73	2.78	Corlies Avenue (Route 33) in Neptune Township	Old Corlies Avenue	Corlies Avenue (Route 33) in Neptune Township	
CR 17 (2)	3.51	5.65	Old Corlies Avenue (CR 17) in Neptune Township	West Bangs Avenue, Bangs Avenue	Bangs Avenue on the Neptune Township/Asbury Park border	
CR 17 (3)	1.39	2.24	Brighton Avenue in Neptune City	West Sylvania Avenue	Route 35 in Neptune City	
CR 17 (4)	0.45	0.72	South Riverside Drive and Lakewood Road in Neptune Township	East End Avenue	West Sylvania Avenue (CR 17) in Neptune City	
CR 17 (5)	0.40	0.64	West Sylvania Avenue (CR 17) in Neptune City	Neptune Avenue	6th Avenue (CR 2) and Taylor Avenue on the Neptune Township/Neptune City border	
CR 17 (6)	0.64	1.03	Main Street (Route 71) in Avon-by-the-Sea	Sylvania Avenue	Ocean Avenue (CR 18) in Avon-by-the-Sea	
CR 18 (1)	8.65	13.92	Main Street (CR 524/CR 547) in Howell	Belmar Boulevard, 16th Avenue	Ocean Avenue (CR 18) in Belmar	
CR 18 (2)	0.45	0.72	Route 34 in Wall Township	Megill Road	Belmar Boulevard (CR 18) in Wall Township	
CR 18 (3)	5.63	9.06	1st Avenue (CR 49) in Spring Lake	Brown Avenue, Ocean Avenue, Lake Terrace	Main Street (Route 71) in Bradley Beach	
CR 19	3.79	6.10	Atlantic Avenue (CR 524) in Wall Township	Allenwood Road, Allaire Road	Route 71 in Spring Lake	Decommissioned on January 1, 1953, and replaced with CR 524
CR 20	3.08	4.96	Holly Hill Drive on the Wall Township/Brielle border	Old Bridge Road, South Street, Broad Street, North Broad Street, 8th Avenue	7th Avenue (Route 71) on the Sea Girt/Wall Township border	
CR 21	8.08	13.00	Squankum–Yellowbrook Road (CR 524A) in Howell Township	Southard Avenue, Manassa Road, Old Tavern Road, Herbertsville Road, Allenwood–Squankum Road, Allenwood–Lakewood Road	Atlantic Avenue (CR 524) and Ramshorn Drive in Wall Township	Gap in route through a portion of Ocean County
CR 22	1.18	1.90	Main Street (CR 527) in Englishtown	Gordons Corner Road	Conmack Lane in Manalapan Township	
CR 23	3.91	6.29	Jackson Mills Road (CR 638) at the Ocean County line in Freehold Township	Jackson Mills Road	Elton–Adelphia Road (CR 524) in Freehold Township	
CR 23A	0.70	1.13	US 9 in Howell Township	Wyckoff Mills Road	CR 524 in Howell Township	Decommissioned on November 21, 1967
CR 24	0.62	1.00	US 9 and Business Route 33 in Freehold Township	Manalapan Avenue	West Main Street (CR 537) in Freehold Borough	
CR 25 (1)	0.99	1.59	Norwood Avenue (Route 71) and Cedar Avenue (Route 71) near the Monmouth University entrance on the Long Branch/West Long Branch border	Cedar Avenue	Ocean Avenue (CR 57) in Long Branch	
CR 25 (2)	1.26	2.03	Cedar Avenue (CR 25) on the Long Branch/West Long Branch border	Norwood Avenue	Broadway in Long Branch	
CR 26	10.01	16.11	Mercer County line in Allentown	Church Street, Waker Avenue, Allentown–Lakewood Road, Trenton–Lakewood Road	Monmouth Road (CR 537) on the Millstone/Jackson township line	Decommissioned on January 1, 1953, and replaced with CR 526
CR 27 (1)	4.67	7.52	Monmouth Road (CR 537) on the Upper Freehold/Plumsted township line	Holmes Mill Road, Burlington Path Road	Meirs Road in Upper Freehold Township	Portion east of CR 539 municipally maintained
CR 27 (2)	1.53	2.46	Holmes Mill Road (CR 27) in Upper Freehold Township	Arneytown–Hornerstown Road	Hornerstown–Whiting Road (CR 539) in Upper Freehold Township	
CR 27 (3)	0.41	0.66	Arneytown–Hornerstown Road (CR 27) in Upper Freehold Township	Main Street	Monmouth Road (CR 537) on the Upper Freehold/Plumsted township line	
CR 28	0.79	1.27	Old York Road at the Mercer County line in Upper Freehold Township	Old York Road, South Main Street	Yardville–Allentown Road (CR 524) in Allentown	
CR 29	2.69	4.33	Monmouth Boulevard (CR 33) in Oceanport	Shrewsbury Avenue, Branchport Avenue, Atlantic Avenue	Ocean Avenue in Long Branch	
CR 29A	0.60	0.97	Port Au Peck Avenue in Oceanport	Myrtle Avenue	Monmouth Boulevard (CR 33) and Myrtle Avenue (CR 33) in Oceanport	
CR 30 (1)	1.25	2.01	Atlantic Avenue (CR 524) in Wall Township	West 18th Avenue	Route 34 in Wall Township	
CR 30 (2)	4.60	7.40	Allenwood Road in Wall Township	18th Avenue, Main Street	8th Avenue (Route 71) and Main Street (Route 71) in Belmar	Portion within Lake Como is municipally maintained
CR 31	0.88	1.42	Wickapecko Drive on the Interlaken/Ocean Township border	Corlies Avenue	NJ Transit's North Jersey Coast Line crossing in Allenhurst	Decommissioned on April 22, 2004
CR 32	2.86	4.60	Route 35 and Industrial Way West in Eatontown	Parker Road, Wall Street	Norwood Avenue (CR 25) on the Long Branch/West Long Branch border	Formerly extended west along Wall Street to the intersection of Route 35 and Route 36
CR 33	3.34	5.38	Rumson Road (CR 520) in Little Silver	Seven Bridges Road, Myrtle Avenue, Monmouth Boulevard, Florence Avenue	Atlantic Avenue (CR 29) in Long Branch	
CR 34	4.54	7.31	Broad Street (CR 11) in Red Bank	Harding Road, Ridge Road, Avenue of Two Rivers	Rumson Road (CR 520) in Rumson	
CR 35	1.80	2.90	West Main Street (CR 524) in Farmingdale	North Main Street, Colts Neck Road	Route 33 in Howell Township	Formerly extended north through Naval Weapons Station Earle to Route 34
CR 36	0.82	1.32	Route 36 in Middletown Township	Thompson Avenue, Ocean Avenue	Bayside Parkway in Middletown Township	
CR 37	1.10	1.77	Norwood Avenue (CR 25) on the Long Branch/West Long Branch border	Brighton Avenue	Ocean Avenue in Long Branch	Decommissioned on May 14, 1987
CR 38	3.54	5.70	Green Grove Road and Bowne Road on the Tinton Falls/Ocean Township border	Wayside Road, Shafto Road	Tinton Avenue (CR 537) in Tinton Falls	
CR 39	2.20	3.54	Route 36 on the Union Beach/Hazlet border	Union Avenue, Front Street, Florence Avenue	Stone Road (CR 6) on the Union Beach/Hazlet border	
CR 40	0.70	1.13	Route 35 in Ocean Township	Sunset Avenue	Wickapecko Drive in Ocean Township	Decommissioned on April 22, 2004
CR 40A	2.11	3.40	Route 35 in Neptune City	Memorial Drive	Monroe Avenue in Asbury Park	Portion north of Springwood Avenue in Asbury Park municipally maintained
CR 41	1.79	2.88	Stagecoach Road (CR 524) in Millstone Township	Clarksburg Road, North Rochdale Avenue	North Rochdale Avenue (CR 571) in Millstone Township	Two separate segments upon entering and leaving Roosevelt; Decommissioned in 1953 and replaced with CR 571
CR 42	1.05	1.69	Route 35 in Keyport	Maple Place	Green Grove Avenue in Keyport	Decommissioned in 1952 and replaced with CR 516
CR 43	1.66	2.67	Trenton–Lakewood Road (CR 526) in Upper Freehold Township	Imlaystown Road, Imlaystown–Hightstown Road	New Canton–Stone Tavern Road (CR 524) in Upper Freehold Township	
CR 44	1.35	2.17	Branchport Avenue in Long Branch	Joline Avenue	Ocean Avenue in Long Branch	Decommissioned on October 17, 1972, and replaced with Route 36
CR 45	0.13	0.21	Gravelly Brook Bridge in Aberdeen Township	Church Street	Henry Hudson Trail on the Aberdeen Township/Matawan border	
CR 46	4.95	7.97	Broadway (Route 79) in Freehold Borough	Dutch Lane Road	Crine Road (CR 4) in Colts Neck Township	
CR 47	1.18	1.90	Allaire Road (CR 524) in Wall Township	Warren Avenue	Railroad Avenue on the Spring Lake Heights/Spring Lake border	
CR 48	1.67	2.69	Route 70 and Old Bridge Road on the Brielle/Wall Township border	Riverview Drive	Higgins Avenue in Brielle	
CR 49	1.54	2.48	8th Avenue (CR 20) and Broad Street (CR 20) on the Manasquan/Sea Girt border	Sea Girt Avenue, Washington Boulevard, The Crescent, 1st Avenue	Brown Avenue (CR 18) in Spring Lake	
CR 50	8.19	13.18	CR 537 in Tinton Falls	Swimming River Road, Middletown–Lincroft Road, Church Street, Kings Highway, New Monmouth Road	Cherry Tree Farm Road (CR 516) and New Monmouth Road (CR 516) in Middletown Township	
CR 51	4.45	7.16	Wyckoff Road (CR 547) and Shafto Road (CR 547) on the Tinton Falls/Eatontown border	Hope Road, Hance Avenue	Newman Springs Road (CR 520) on the Tinton Falls/Red Bank border	Portion between CR 537 and CR 13A municipally maintained
CR 52	5.23	8.42	Newman Springs Road (CR 520) on the Holmdel/Middletown township line	Everett Road, Red Hill Road, Van Schoick Road, South Laurel Avenue	Route 35 and Laurel Avenue (CR 516) in Holmdel Township	
CR 53	1.03	1.66	Turkey Swamp Park entrance in Freehold Township	Georgia Road	Jackson Mills Road (CR 23) in Freehold Township	
CR 54	3.82	6.15	Route 34 and Flock Road in Colts Neck Township	Phalanx Road	Newman Springs Road (CR 520) in Middletown Township	Portion east of the Swimming River Reservoir Bridge municipally maintained
CR 55	5.50	8.85	US 9 in Freehold Township	Edinburgh Drive, Halls Mill Road, Kozloski Road	Route 79 in Freehold Township	
CR 56	0.96	1.54	Church Street (CR 7) in Keansburg	Carr Avenue	Beachway Avenue in Keansburg	
CR 57	2.21	3.56	Cedar Avenue (CR 25) in Long Branch	Ocean Avenue, Ocean Boulevard	Joline Avenue (Route 36) and Ocean Boulevard (Route 36) in Long Branch	
