= New Jersey Route 36 =

State highway in Monmouth County, New Jersey, US

Route 36
- Route 36 highlighted in red

Route information
- Maintained by NJDOT
- Length: 24.40 mi (39.27 km)
- Existed: 1927–present

Major junctions
- West end: G.S. Parkway / CR 51 in Eatontown
- Route 18 in Eatontown; Route 35 in Eatontown; Route 71 in West Long Branch
- North end: G.S. Parkway / Route 35 in Keyport

Location
- Country: United States
- State: New Jersey
- Counties: Monmouth

Highway system
- New Jersey State Highway Routes; Interstate; US; State; Scenic Byways
← Route 35	→ Route 37
← CR 8B	CR 9	→ CR 10
← CR 43	CR 44	→ CR 45

Route 36 is a state highway in Monmouth County, New Jersey, United States. The 24.40-mile (39.27 km) long route, shaped as a backwards C, begins at an intersection with the Garden State Parkway and Hope Road (County Route 51, CR 51) on the border of Tinton Falls and Eatontown and runs east to Long Branch. From Long Branch, the route follows the Atlantic Ocean north to Sea Bright and turns west, running to the south of the Raritan Bay. Route 36 ends in Keyport at an interchange with the Garden State Parkway and Route 35. It varies in width from a six-lane divided highway to a two-lane undivided road. The route is signed east–west between Eatontown and Long Branch and north–south between Long Branch and Keyport.

Route 36 was created in 1927 to run from Keyport to Highlands along a winding route that went through the downtowns of Keyport, Keansburg, and Atlantic Highlands. In 1929, the route was modified to bypass the downtown areas. Route 36 was extended to Eatontown in 1940 with only the portion within Eatontown and West Long Branch built. The remainder of the route was created with the takeover of Joline Avenue in Long Branch and Ocean Avenue in Monmouth Beach and Sea Bright from Monmouth County on October 17, 1972, and the completion of Ocean Boulevard in Long Branch in late 1983.

== Route description ==
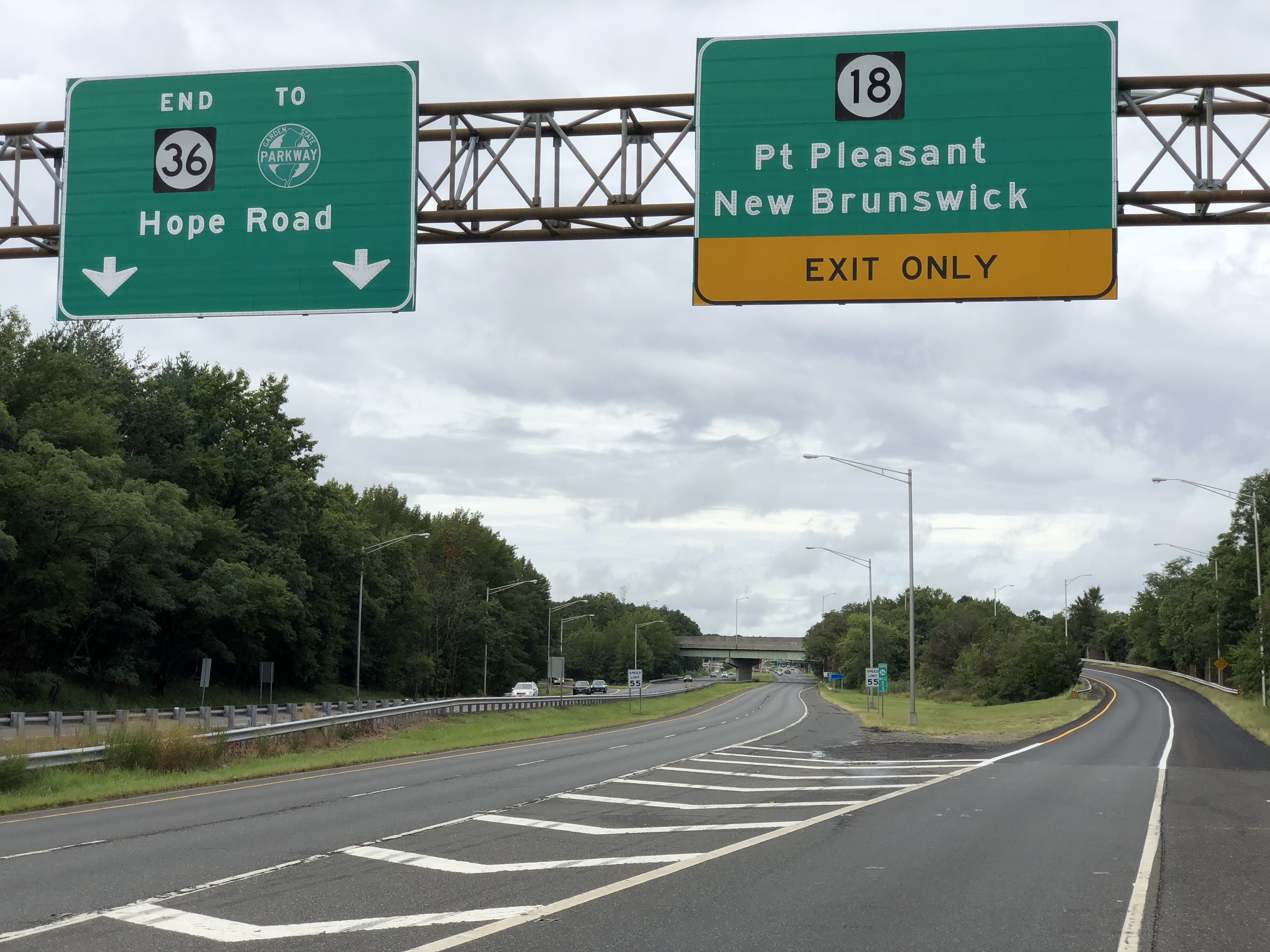
Route 36 westbound at Route 18 in Eatontown

Route 36 begins at the intersection with Hope Road (CR 51) and exit 105 on the Garden State Parkway in Eatontown, heading east along a four-lane divided highway. Soon after beginning, it features ramps that provide access to Route 18 in both the westbound and eastbound directions. The route widens to six lanes and crosses the intersection with Wyckoff Road (CR 547). After that intersection, Route 36 passes by the Monmouth Mall and intersects Route 35 at the former Eatontown Circle, which has been reconstructed to an at-grade intersection with ramps. Route 36 continues east through commercial development and crosses into West Long Branch, where it comes to an intersection with Monmouth Road (Route 71). The route heads northeast, passing by Shore Regional High School, and crosses the intersection with Eatontown Boulevard/Broadway (CR 547). Route 36 meets the intersection with Oceanport Avenue (CR 11) and comes to the entrance to the Monmouth Park Racetrack. Route 36 narrows to a two-lane undivided highway and crosses into Long Branch, where it becomes Joline Avenue. In Long Branch, the route crosses the intersection with Myrtle Avenue and NJ Transit's North Jersey Coast Line. Route 36 heads toward the Atlantic Ocean, where it intersects Ocean Boulevard (CR 57), the route turns north and runs along the Atlantic Ocean on Ocean Boulevard, a four-lane divided road. Route 36 intersects Atlantic Avenue (CR 29) and crosses into Monmouth Beach, where it narrows to a two-lane undivided road and becomes Ocean Avenue. It continues through Monmouth Beach, where it runs just west of the Sea Bright–Monmouth Beach Seawall separating the road from the ocean, and enters Sea Bright. Here, Route 36 heads north onto a narrow peninsula between the Shrewsbury River and the Atlantic Ocean, meeting the intersection with Rumson Road (CR 520). The route continues north along the peninsula to a trumpet interchange that provides access to Gateway National Recreation Area at Sandy Hook.

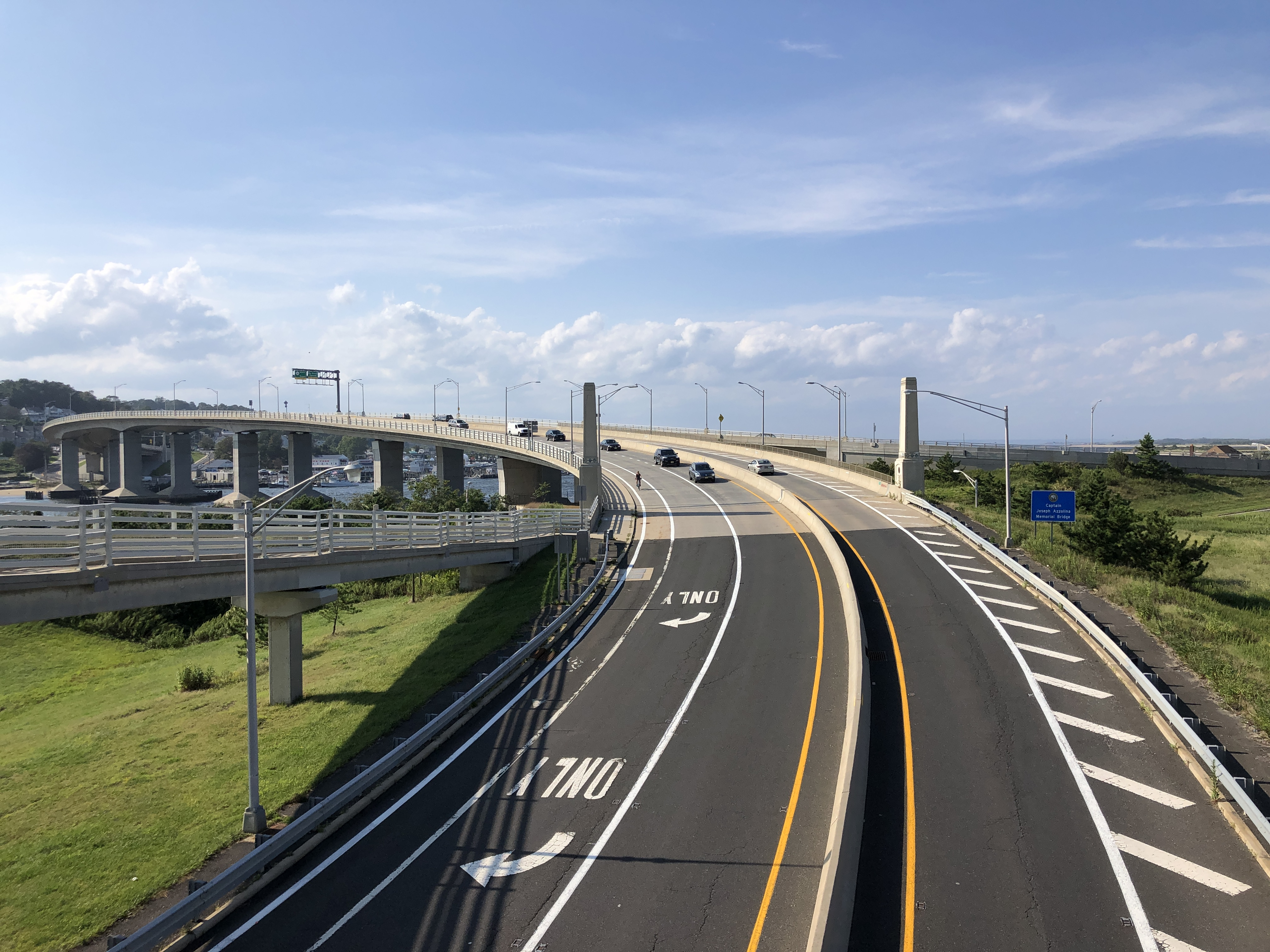
Route 36 northbound across the Highlands–Sea Bright Bridge

Route 36 turns west and crosses the Shrewsbury River on the four-lane Highlands–Sea Bright Bridge, continuing into Highlands. It intersects Bay Avenue (CR 8) and continues west on a four-lane divided highway with a jersey barrier and some intersections featuring jughandles that runs a short distance to the south of the Raritan Bay. The route then forms the border between Highlands and Middletown Township, with Highlands to the north and Middletown to the south. Route 36 intersects two separate sections of CR 8, Linden Avenue and Ocean Boulevard soon after, before intersecting Navesink Avenue (CR 8B) and fully entering Middletown. Route 36 continues as Memorial Parkway, and crosses into Atlantic Highlands. In Atlantic Highlands, the route intersects Valley Drive East (CR 8A) and First Avenue (CR 8). It crosses back into Middletown and meets the intersection with Leonardville Road (CR 516). Route 36 passes under Normandy Road, which serves as a road and railroad link between the two sections of Naval Weapons Station Earle, with an entrance present to Normandy Road. The route drops Memorial Parkway and meets the intersection with Thompson Avenue (CR 36). It crosses the intersection with Palmer Avenue/Main Street (CR 7) and forms the border between Hazlet to the south and Keansburg to the north. Route 36 eventually fully enters Hazlet and intersects Monroe Avenue (CR 7). The route then forms the border between Hazlet to the south and Union Beach to the north and passes over Natco Lake. It intersects Union Avenue (CR 39) and then Stone Road (CR 6), where Route 36 fully enters Hazlet again. The route crosses the intersection with Middle Road (CR 516) and passes between an Academy Bus Lines terminal to the north and a shopping center that contains a park and ride lot to the south before it enters Keyport. Route 36 intersects Broad Street (CR 4) and continues to its terminus at an interchange with Route 35 and the Garden State Parkway at exit 117. The overall shape of Route 36 is that of a backwards C.

== History ==
=== Ocean Boulevard / Route 16 ===
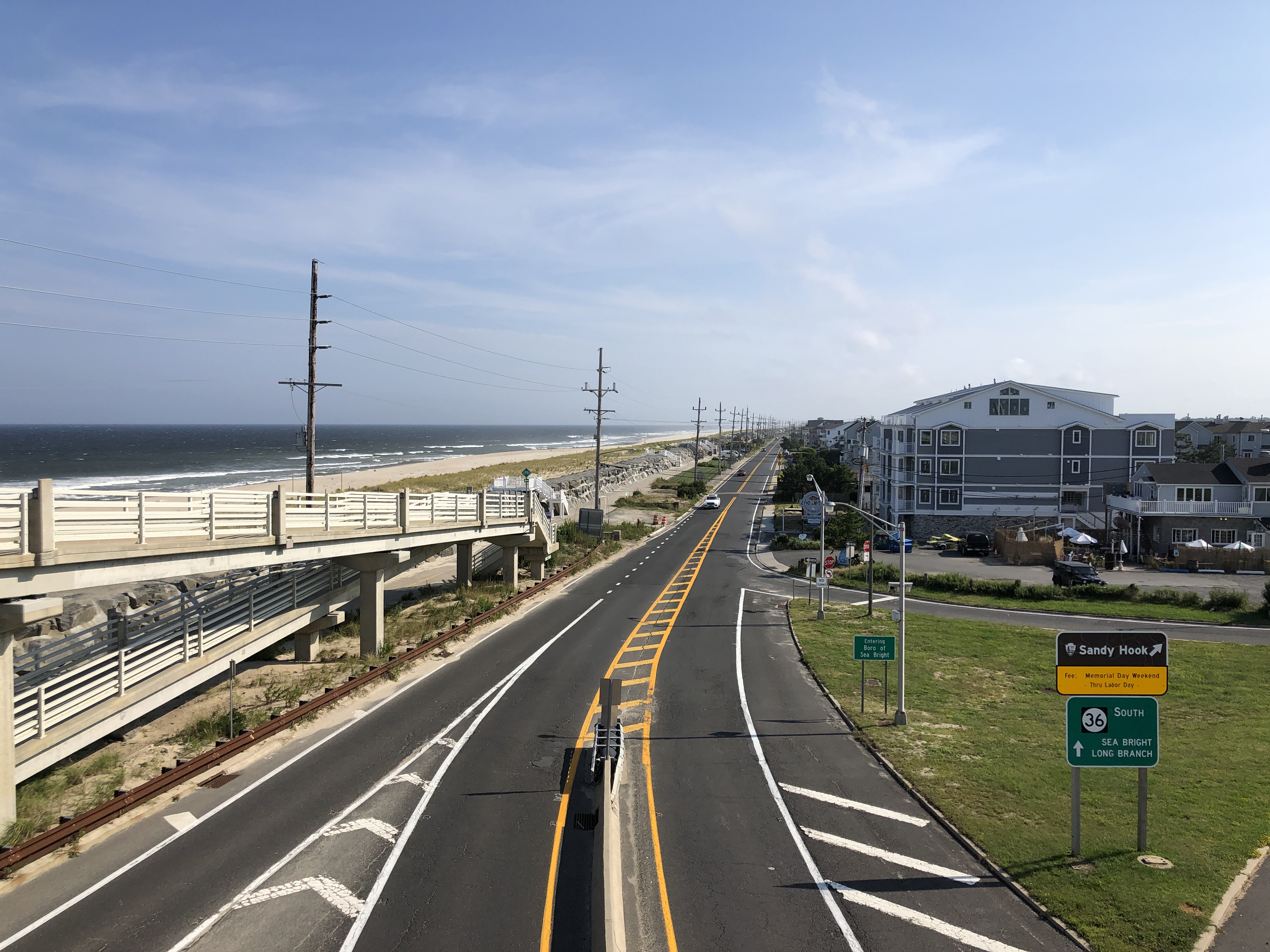
View southbound along Route 36 at the entrance to Sandy Hook in Sea Bright

What is now Route 36 from Atlantic Highlands to Long Branch was part of the Jersey Coast Way, which ran from the Staten Island Ferry to Cape May.

In January 1916, State Senator Henry E. Ackerson Jr. introduced a bill to extend Ocean Boulevard from Bay Head to Manasquan with an extension planned to the Shrewsbury River. As part of this, he wanted to extend Ocean Boulevard from Atlantic Highlands to Keyport via Keansburg and Port Monmouth. Ackerson asked that the state take over maintenance of Ocean Boulevard and continue it west to Keyport, reaching the Keyport–Red Bank Turnpike, which the state had interest in turning into a state thoroughfare. The Senate Appropriation Committee held a hearing on February 7, where several senators and high ranking officials in the state offered their support for the new road. This included Benjamin Morris of Long Branch, Commissioner George Pittenger of Asbury Park and a representative of the Waterway League of New Jersey. Pittenger stated that the construction of Ocean Boulevard would help bring new motorists to resorts on the Shore in Monmouth County. Ackerson announced on March 7 that the Senate passed his Ocean Boulevard bill. The bill included $5,000 for the surveying and mapping of the extension from Atlantic Highlands to Keyport, passing 15–0. $75,000 from the general fund and $75,000 from the state's motor vehicle funds. Construction of the extension would begin in 1916 and be finished by 1926.

Surveying for the extension of Ocean Boulevard occurred in June 1916, with the new road along Bay Avenue through several Monmouth County municipalities between Atlantic Highlands and Keyport along Raritan Bay.

Progress stalled until 1918, when Ackerson proposed a new bill in January, amending a $15 million act (Good Roads Bill) to give money for a state highway system. Ackerson's new bill would designate the Ocean Boulevard extension between Keyport and Atlantic Highlands as Route 16. By February, there was local concern about the Route 16 amendment passing through the State Legislature.

Ackerson tried again in January 1919, proposing a bill to amend the March 1917 "An Act to Establish a State Highway System and to Provide for the Improvement, Betterment, Reconstruction, Resurfacing, Maintenance, Repair and Regulation of the Use Thereof" to add Route 16 to the state highway system. This new road would begin on Route 4 in the area of Keyport to Atlantic Highlands, down Ocean Avenue in Sea Bright to Norwood Avenue in Allenhurst. The Monmouth County Board of Freeholders endorsed the paving of the proposed Route 16 at a meeting on February 10, 1919. In their endorsement, the organization stated that Ocean Avenue and Lake Avenue in the city of Asbury Park would be offered to the State Highway Department for improvement for the new Route 16 by 1921. Local concern voiced at the meeting expressed concern that the State Highway Commission would not accept Route 16 or provide any connections to it. One commissioner stated that the same occurred with Route 4 and that there was hope they would consider changing their minds on Route 16.

The League of Mayors endorsed the new Route 16, but noted that people in Asbury Park wanted the route to go through their municipality and that of Ocean Grove. League Assemblyman Dallas Young added that Route 16 would add 20 miles (32 km) to the 56 miles (90 km) the state wanted to add to the system in Monmouth County. T. Lloyd Lewis stated that he would address the request of those in Asbury Park with Ackerson. However, on March 4, Ackerson withdrew his bill for Route 16, stating that he was not confident he had the votes for the bill to pass. Ackerson re-offered the bill once more on March 18, but the bill failed by a vote of 11–5. The opposition's spokesperson, Senator Clarence E. Case, stated that Monmouth County was already given preference in their decision making of the current highway map.

Senator William A. Stevens, Ackerson's replacement, brought back a bill to construct the Ocean Boulevard stretch between Atlantic Highlands and Keyport in January 1925. Unlike the bill from Ackerson in 1919, Stevens' vote passed the Senate unanimously to build the 5.5-mile (8.9 km) road. Stevens stated that the congestion in Keyport was one of the worst centers in the state and the new route would provide a detour to reduce congestion in Monmouth County.

=== Route 36 ===
Route 36 was established by the Laws of 1927, Chapter 319 to run between Keyport and Highlands. The route was to run up Broad Street from Front Street in Keyport, follow 1st Street east to the 2nd Street Bridge, and run east along Stone Road to Keansburg. It would pass through Keansburg on Church Street and follow Shore Road east to the Belford drawbridge and then on through more rural fields and meadows. Route 36 would head along Center Avenue from Ocean View to Atlantic Highlands, where it would turn north on First Avenue and run east along Ocean Boulevard to Route 36 in Highlands. Route 36 would follow east to the drawbridge over the Shrewsbury River. This routing as proposed was considered impractical as it consisted entirely of local roads, went through the downtown areas of Keyport, Keansburg and Atlantic Highlands, and contained many hazardous sharp curves. This was remedied in 1929, when Route 36 was designated to bypass the downtowns and sharp curves.

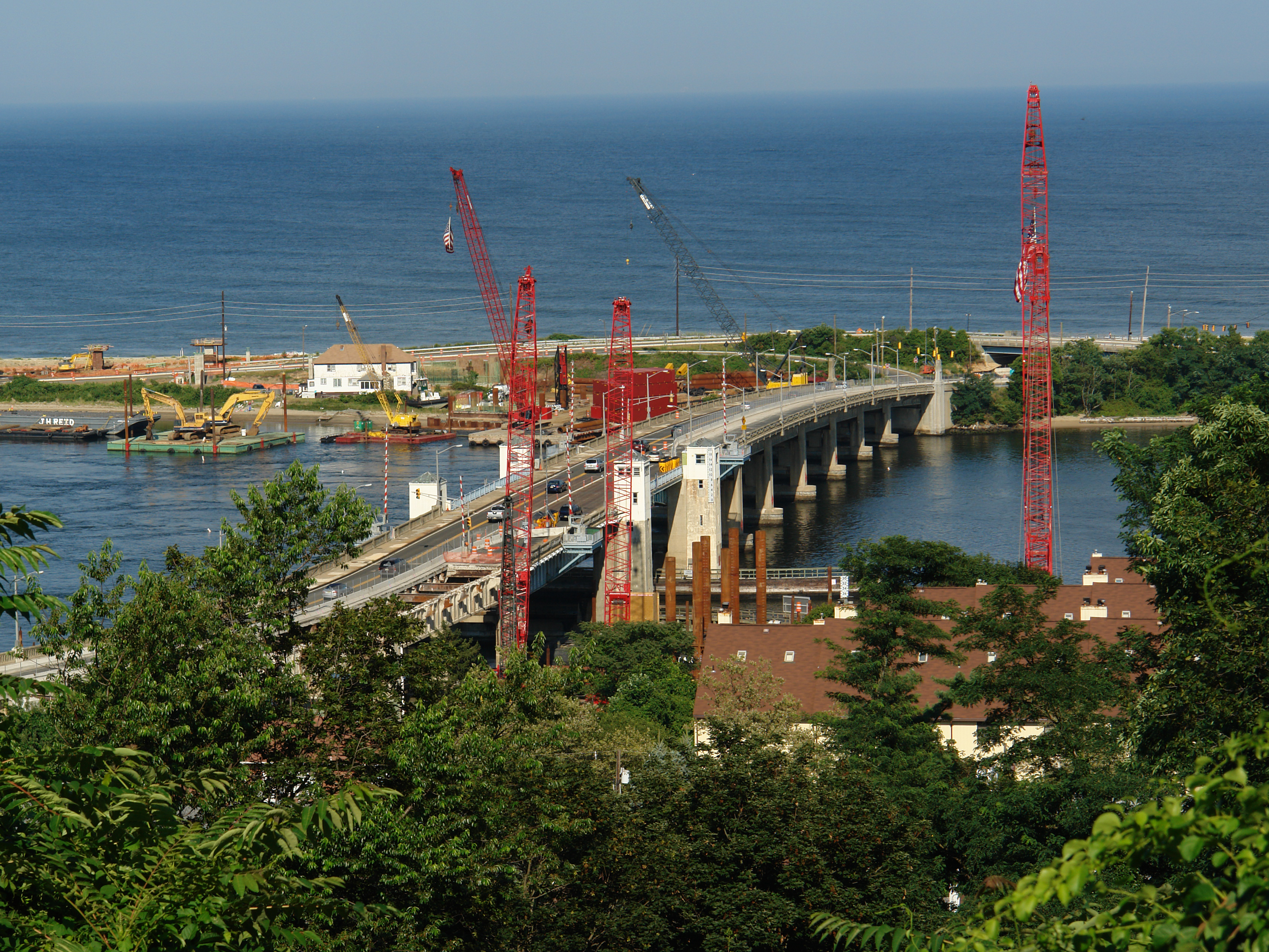
Construction on the Highlands–Sea Bright Bridge, which was replaced with a fixed span in 2011

In 1940, Route 36 was extended south to Route 35 in Eatontown, but only a portion was constructed in Eatontown and West Long Branch. As a result, this extension remained unsigned in the 1953 New Jersey state highway renumbering. Additional parts of this extension were taken over on October 17, 1972, with the takeover of County Route 9, which was Ocean Avenue between the Long Branch–Monmouth Beach border and the Sea Bright–Middletown border, and County Route 44, which was Joline Avenue between Branchport Avenue and Ocean Avenue in Long Branch. CR 9 was initially taken over as a county highway by resolution of the Monmouth County Board of Chosen Freeholders on September 1, 1903, running from Rumson Road north to the Middletown border at Sandy Hook. It was extended to the southern border of Monmouth Beach by two resolutions dated February 4, 1920. CR 44 was taken over as a county road on October 18, 1939. Following the takeover of CR 9 and CR 44, a short gap of Route 36 remained in Long Branch (Ocean Avenue between Joline Avenue and the Monmouth Beach border) that was municipally maintained; with the completion of Ocean Boulevard in late 1983 that link has been added.

Between 2008 and 2011, the Highlands–Sea Bright Bridge, which was originally a drawbridge, was replaced with a fixed span with a clearance 30 feet (9.1 m) higher than its predecessor.

== In popular culture ==
The Marina Diner from the 1997 film Chasing Amy, now known as the King Arms II Diner, is located along Route 36 in Belford. Additionally, the Quick Stop Groceries and RST Video stores from the 1994 film Clerks are located just north of the highway's intersection with Leonard Avenue in Leonardo. Both films were created by former New Jersey resident Kevin Smith.

== Major intersections ==
The entire route is in Monmouth County.

Location	mi	km	Destinations	Notes
Eatontown	0.00	0.00	CR 51 (Hope Road); G.S. Parkway – Toms River, Woodbridge	Exit 105 (Garden State Parkway); no commercial vehicles allowed on the Garden State Parkway north of this exit
Eatontown	0.26	0.42	Route 18 – Point Pleasant, New Brunswick	Westbound exit, eastbound entrance; exit 13B on Route 18; interchange
Eatontown	1.27	2.04	CR 547 (Wyckoff Road)	To Route 35 north; access to Little Silver Station
Eatontown	1.54	2.48	Route 35 – Fort Monmouth, Red Bank, The Amboys, Asbury Park, Seaside Hts	Former Eatontown Circle
West Long Branch	2.78	4.47	Route 71 (Monmouth Road) – West Long Branch, Asbury Park, Eatontown	Access to Monmouth Medical Center and Monmouth University
West Long Branch	3.26	5.25	CR 547 (Eatontown Boulevard/Broadway) – Oceanport, Long Branch	Access to Long Branch Station and Monmouth Medical Center
Sea Bright	9.37	15.08	CR 520 west (Rumson Road) to G.S. Parkway	Eastern terminus of CR 520
Sea Bright	11.48	18.48	Gateway National Recreation Area – Sandy Hook	Interchange
Shrewsbury River	11.63	18.72	Highlands–Sea Bright Bridge	
Highlands	11.77	18.94	Bay Avenue – Highlands	Interchange; access via CR 8 west
Middletown Township	15.39	24.77	CR 516 west (Leonardville Road) – Highlands	Eastern terminus of CR 516
Hazlet	23.59	37.96	CR 516 (Middle Road) – Keyport, Hazlet	
Keyport	24.40	39.27	Route 35 north to N.J. Turnpike (I-95) – Matawan, The Amboys; G.S. Parkway – Woodbridge, North Jersey	No access from Route 36 to Route 35 southbound or from Route 35 northbound to Route 36; interchange; exit 117 on Garden State Parkway
1.000 mi = 1.609 km; 1.000 km = 0.621 mi: Incomplete access
