= New Jersey Route 71 =

State highway in New Jersey, US

Route 71

Route information
- Maintained by NJDOT
- Length: 16.78 mi (27.00 km)
- Existed: January 1, 1953–present

Major junctions
- South end: Route 35 in Brielle
- Route 35 in Belmar; Route 33 in Neptune; Route 36 in West Long Branch
- North end: Route 35 in Eatontown

Location
- Country: United States
- State: New Jersey
- Counties: Monmouth

Highway system
- New Jersey State Highway Routes; Interstate; US; State; Scenic Byways
← Route 70	→ Route 72

Route 71 is a state highway in New Jersey that runs 16.78 miles (27.00 km) near the shore and located exclusively in Monmouth County. It begins at Route 35 in Brielle just north of the Manasquan River and the Ocean County line and heads north to Route 35 in Eatontown with a four block concurrency with Route 35 in Belmar. Monmouth University is located off Route 71 in West Long Branch.

Route 71 is the former alignment of State Highway Route 4 and Route 35. In 1927, the alignment became the designation of State Highway Route 4-N. This alignment remained intact until the state highway renumbering in 1953, when it became Route 71. The route has remained virtually unchanged since. Route 71 was also to serve as the eastern terminus of Route 33 in Neptune, but this never came to be.

== Route description ==
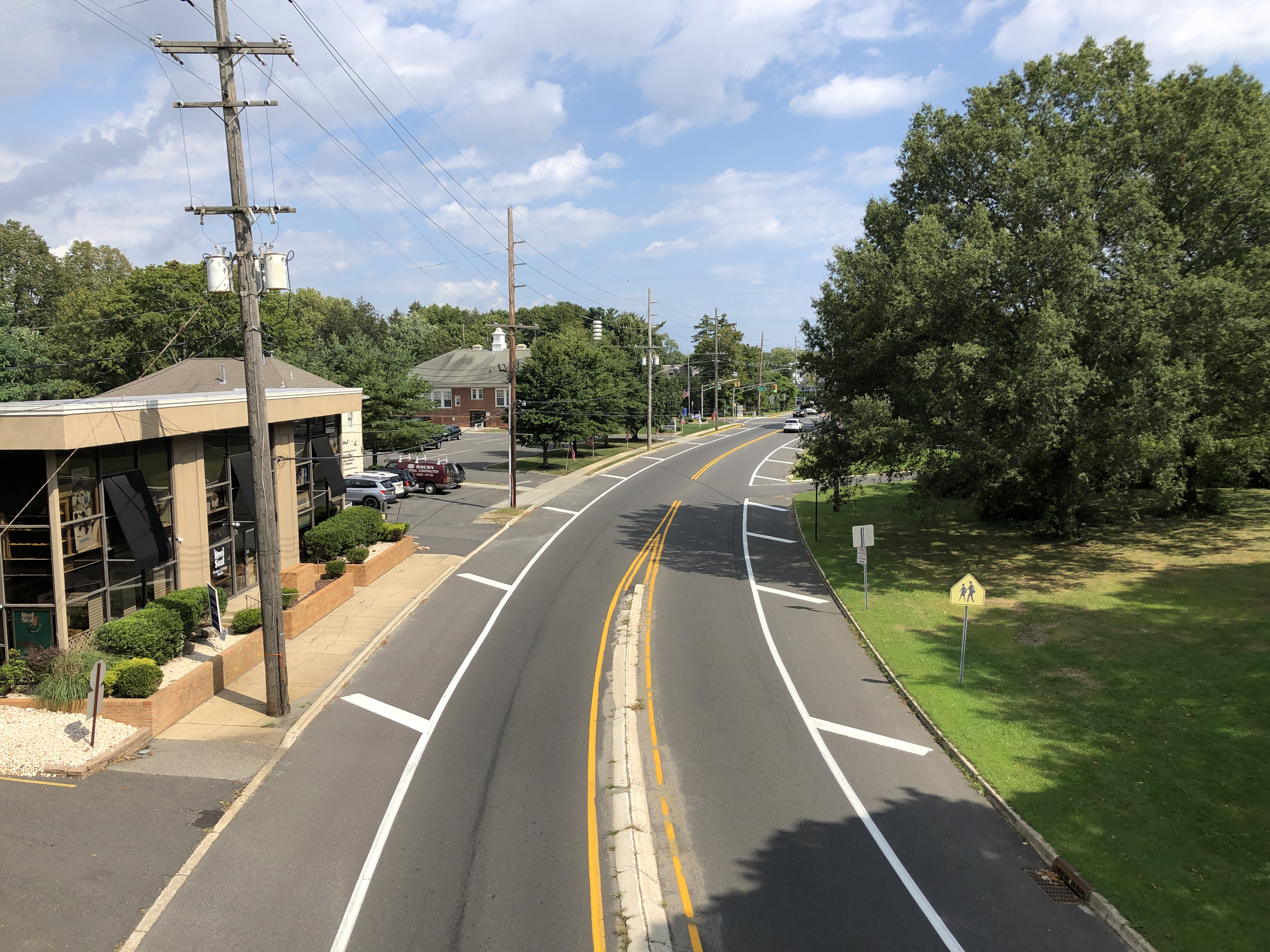
View northbound along Route 71 from Route 35 in Brielle

Route 71 begins at large grade-separated interchange with Route 35 in the community of Brielle. The route heads northward through Brielle as Union Avenue, passing through the commercial district and residential after the intersection with Union Lane. Route 71 continues northward through Brielle as a two-lane highway before beginning a parallel with NJ Transit's North Jersey Coast Line. After entering the community of Manasquan, the highway enters a large commercial district and crosses over the Stockton Brook before curving onto Seventh Avenue. After the intersection with County Route 49 (CR 49, Sea Girt Avenue), Route 71 enters the community of Sea Girt. The route continues north through Sea Girt until the intersection with CR 20 (Manasquan Turnpike), where it enters a short portion of Wall Township. There, the route crosses over the North Branch of the Wreck Pond and enters Spring Lake Heights. Route 71 quickly passes the Spring Lake Golf Club and the nearby Spring Lake train station before entering the downtown portions of Spring Lake Heights.

Most of Spring Lake Heights is residential, with a large condominium complex surrounding the southbound direction on Route 71. The highway continues northward, intersecting with CR 524 (Alliare Road) and passes Marucci Park. Route 71 intersects with CR 30 (Eighteenth Avenue), where the highway enters the Belmar community of West Belmar. After crossing the intersection with CR 18 (Sixteenth Avenue), Route 71 enters the downtown portion of Belmar, intersecting with Route 35 (River Road). There, Route 35/Route 71 runs concurrently through Belmar, passing the local Belmar train station. At the intersection with Eighth Avenue, Route 71 turns off to the east and crosses parallel to Route 35 over the Shark River to the community of Avon-by-the-Sea, becoming Main Street. There, the two routes continue to parallel, with Route 71 becoming a divided one-way street through Avon-by-the-Sea. The route continues northward through the residential seashore community, crossing the Sylvan Creek and entering Bradley Beach. Through Bradley Beach, Route 71 intersects with CR 2 (Brinley Avenue), which serves access to the Bradley Beach train station. The highway continues northward through the residential district, and enters Neptune Township. There, Route 71 intersects with the eastern terminus of the cross-state Route at Corlies Avenue before entering the large city of Asbury Park.

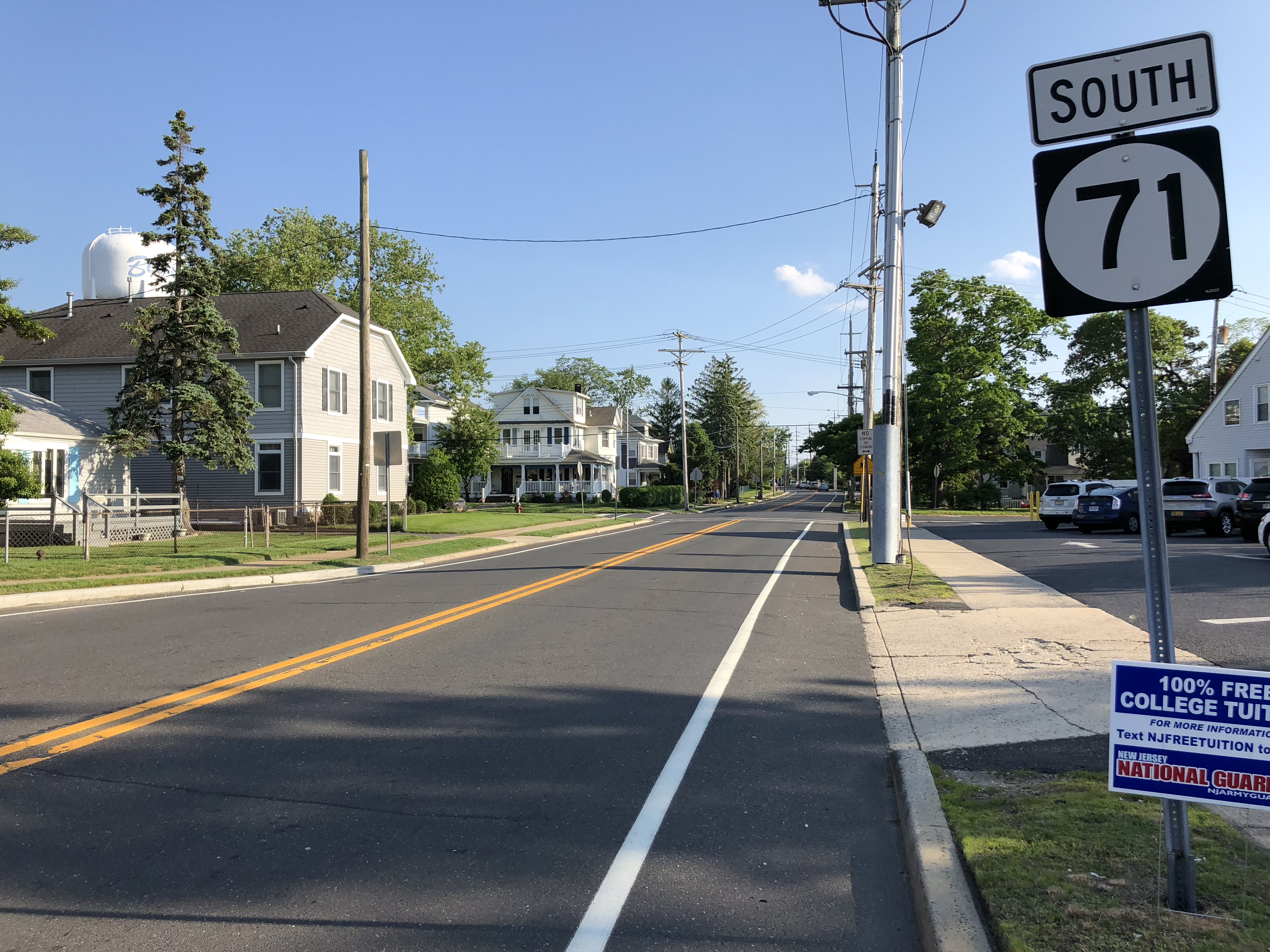
View south along Route 71 at Route 35 in Belmar

Through Asbury Park, Route 71 intersects with several local streets at traffic lights as Main Street. The route also serves as the terminus of both CR 16 and CR 18. After crossing through Sunset Park, Route 71 approaches Deal Lake, where the highway turns to the east along Deal Lake Drive. Route 71's right-of-way on Main Street becomes CR 15 and Route 71 continues through the lakeshore community as a two-lane arterial. Soon after, Route 71 turns on Park Avenue, crosses over Deal Lake and enters Loch Arbour. However, the highway heads northward into the community of Allenhurst soon after. Route 71, now known as Norwood Avenue, crosses out of Allenhurst after an intersection with Cedar Avenue, entering the community of Deal. Before the intersection with Roseld Avenue, the highway becomes a divided one with a center median. The route continues this way through the residential portions of Deal, crossing into Ocean Township. There, the route comes back together, crossing over the North Jersey Coast Line once again near the Elberon train station. Route 71 continues along the Ocean Township–Long Branch border until entering the community of West Long Branch near Whale Pond Brook. At that point, Route 71 serves as the main road to access Monmouth University. At the intersection with Cedar Avenue, Norwood Avenue ends, and Route 71 northbound turns westward along Cedar. The route crosses through Monmouth University and enters the residential portions of West Long Branch, intersecting with CR 15 and CR 32 within a mile of each other. At the intersection with CR 15, Route 71 turns to the northwest through a residential area. Route 71 parallels the Glenwood Cemetery before intersecting with Route 36 in West Long Branch. Here, Route 71 continues northwestward on Monmouth Road through large commercial complexes and the local country club. The highway continues northward into Eatontown, where it enters a local residential area and intersects with CR 547 (Eatontown Boulevard), which become concurrent. Route 71 and CR 547 enter downtown Eatontown as Broad Street, heading westward as CR 547 splits at Wyckoff Road. The highway continues into the commercial district of Eatontown, where it intersects Route 35 once again but Route 71 terminates.

== History ==
Route 4N
- Location: Brielle–Eatontown
- Existed: 1927–1953

From Long Branch to Deal Lake, the road was maintained as part of the Long Branch and Deal Turnpike, which also stretched north along Norwood Avenue and Branchport Avenue. Route 71 originates as part of the Jersey Coast Way, an auto trail running from the Staten Island Ferry to Cape May. This was later an alignment of State Highway Route 4 in the 1920s, which ran from Absecon in Atlantic County northward to Rahway in Union County. Route 4 remained intact through the 1927 state highway renumbering, when Route 4 was realigned onto the current alignment of Route 35 most of its length. The older alignment from Belmar to Eatontown was re-designated as State Highway Route 4 N by the New Jersey State Highway Department. Route 4-N was one of four routes that used the -N suffix from the original numbering. Route 35 was designated on the southern portion, but this got reversed, allowing the designation to be extended to Brielle. The highway department originally planned for maintenance of this section to revert to local maintenance, but years of campaigning by locals prompted the highway department to restore the state highway in 1931. The route remained intact for the next 22 years, until the second state highway renumbering in 1953. Route 35 remained on its basic alignment, but State Highway Route 4-N was renumbered to Route 71. Route 71 has remained virtually unchanged since the 1953 renumbering in terms of its alignment from Brielle to Eatontown. During the time of the proposed Route 33 Freeway from Trenton to Neptune, the intersection with Route 33 in Neptune was to be upgraded to a grade-separated interchange, but this portion was never built after being canned in 1967.

== Major intersections ==
The entire route is in Monmouth County.

Location	mi	km	Destinations	Notes
Brielle	0.00	0.00	Route 35 – Point Pleasant, Seaside Heights	Southern terminus, interchange
Spring Lake Heights	3.70	5.95	CR 524 west (Allaire Road) to G.S. Parkway – Allaire	Eastern terminus of CR 524
Belmar	5.10	8.21	Route 35 south (River Road)	Southern end of Route 35 concurrency; no access to Route 35 southbound from Route 71 northbound
Belmar	5.42	8.72	Route 35 north (River Road)	Northern end of Route 35 concurrency
Neptune Township	7.66	12.33	Route 33 west (Corlies Avenue) to Route 18 / G.S. Parkway	Eastern terminus of Route 33, access to Jersey Shore University Medical Center
West Long Branch	14.79	23.80	Route 36 – Long Branch, Tinton Falls	
Eatontown	15.58	25.07	CR 547 north (Eatontown Boulevard) – West Long Branch, Long Branch	Southern end of CR 547 concurrency
Eatontown	15.79	25.41	CR 547 south (Wyckoff Road) to G.S. Parkway	Northern end of CR 547 concurrency
Eatontown	16.78	27.00	Route 35 (Main Street) – Asbury Park, New York City	Northern terminus
1.000 mi = 1.609 km; 1.000 km = 0.621 mi: Concurrency terminus
