= New Jersey Route 35 =

State highway in eastern New Jersey, US

Route 35
- Route 35 highlighted in red

Route information
- Maintained by NJDOT
- Length: 58.11 mi (93.52 km)
- Existed: 1927–present

Major junctions
- South end: Island Beach State Park in Berkeley Township
- Route 37 in Seaside Heights; Route 88 in Point Pleasant Beach; Route 34 / Route 70 in Wall Township; Route 138 in Wall Township; G.S. Parkway / Route 36 in Keyport; G.S. Parkway / US 9 in Sayreville; Route 184 / CR 501 / Route 440 in Perth Amboy; US 1-9 in Woodbridge Township
- North end: Route 27 in Rahway

Location
- Country: United States
- State: New Jersey
- Counties: Ocean, Monmouth, Middlesex, Union

Highway system
- New Jersey State Highway Routes; Interstate; US; State; Scenic Byways
← Route 34	→ Route 36

Route 35 is a state highway in the U.S. state of New Jersey, primarily traveling through the easternmost parts of Middlesex, Monmouth, and Ocean counties. It runs 58.11 mi (93.52 km) from the entrance to Island Beach State Park in Berkeley Township, Ocean County, to an intersection with Lincoln Highway/St. Georges Avenue (Route 27) in Rahway, Union County. Between Seaside Park and Mantoloking, Route 35 follows the right-of-way of the former Pennsylvania Railroad along the Jersey Shore. The route heads through Point Pleasant Beach and crosses the Manasquan River on the Brielle Bridge, meeting Route 34 and Route 70 at the former Brielle Circle in Wall Township. From there, Route 35 heads north and intersects Route 138, an extension of Interstate 195 (I-195), continuing north through Monmouth County before crossing the Victory Bridge over the Raritan River into Perth Amboy, where the route continues north to Rahway.

Route 35 was designated in 1927 to run from Lakewood Township to South Amboy, from Lakewood Township to Belmar and from Eatontown to South Amboy. It was realigned onto its current alignment between Brielle and Belmar in 1929 and saw a northward extension along U.S. Route 9 (US 9) from South Amboy to Iselin in 1947. In 1953, Route 35 was realigned to run from Point Pleasant to Seaside Heights along a former part of Route 37, with Route 35 between Lakewood Township and Point Pleasant becoming Route 88. At the same time, Route 35 was removed from US 9 between South Amboy and Iselin and realigned to follow a former piece of Route 4 between South Amboy and Rahway. From the late 1950s to the mid-1970s, there were plans to build a freeway along the Route 35 corridor from Seaside Heights north into Monmouth County; the only portion that was built became part of Route 18. Route 35 was extended south to the Island Beach State Park entrance by the 1980s. Recent improvements to the route have removed many traffic circles and replaced the first cloverleaf interchange in the United States, built in 1929, at US 1/9 in Woodbridge Township with a partial cloverleaf interchange.

== Route description ==
=== Ocean County ===
Route 35 begins at the entrance to Island Beach State Park in Berkeley Township, Ocean County, at the southern tip of the Barnegat Peninsula. South of Seaside Park, Route 35 is Central Avenue as it is the only road while it travels along the shore of the Peninsula. It heads north, varying between a two-lane road to a four-lane divided highway with parking spaces in the median and bike lanes on the outside through residential areas of South Seaside Park. It briefly becomes an undivided highway before crossing into Seaside Park, where the route becomes four-lane, divided Central Avenue, which also has median parking spaces. Route 35 passes by residences in Seaside Park, with the median widening for the Seaside Park Police Department building at the intersection of 6th Avenue, and then the road widening to six lanes further north. Upon crossing the intersection of Decatur Avenue, the southbound lanes of Route 35 run one block to the west of the northbound lanes and then turns to the west, bypassing Seaside Heights, a beach resort that has a boardwalk and an amusement pier. There, Route 35 turns north and has an interchange with the eastern terminus of Route 37 on the Seaside Heights/Berkeley Township border on the eastern shore of the Barnegat Bay. At this interchange, a ramp provides access from northbound Route 35 a short distance past the ramp from eastbound Route 37 to Seaside Heights, connecting to Sumner Avenue.

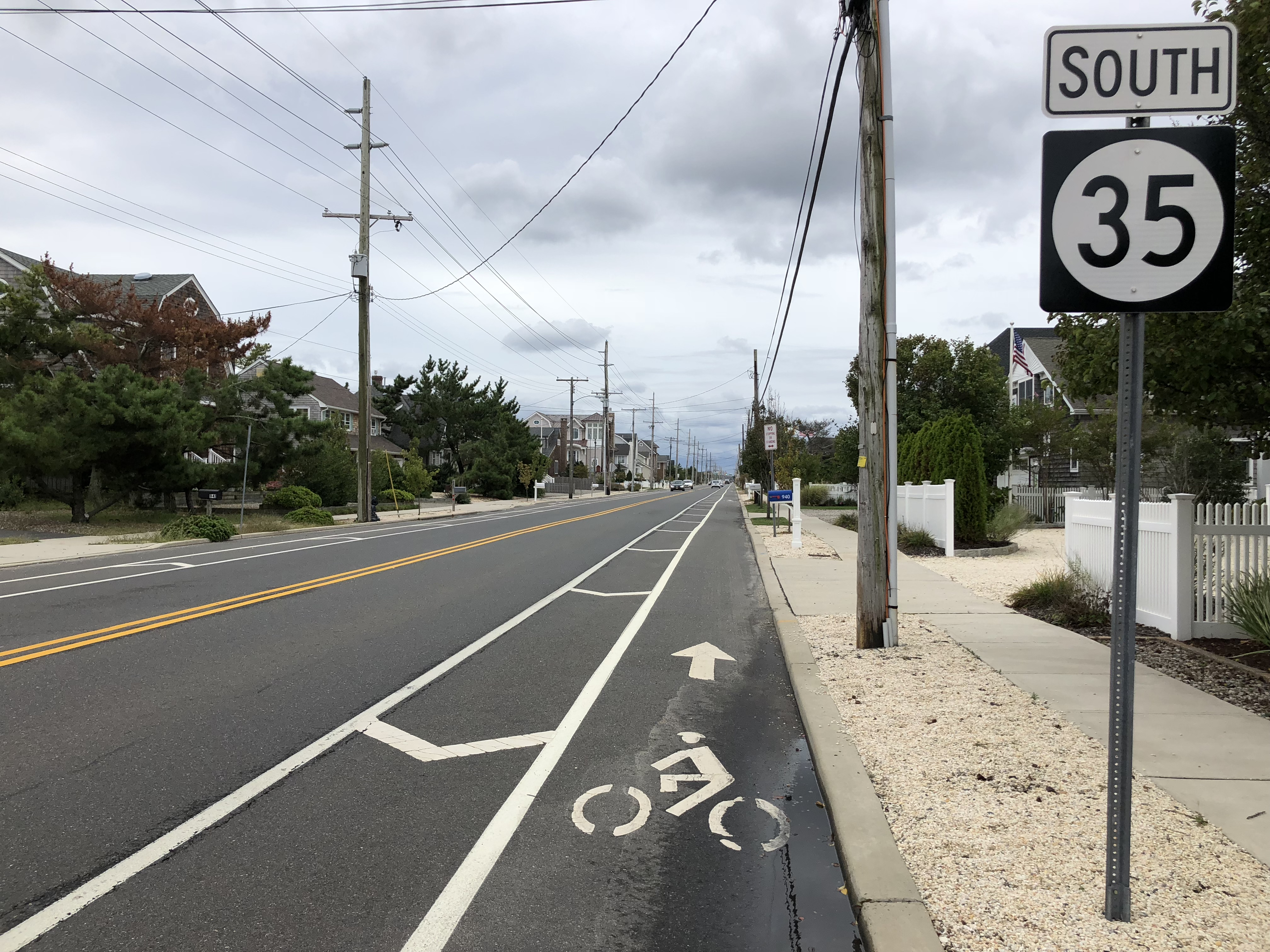
Route 35 southbound in Mantoloking

Past the Route 37 interchange, Route 35 continues north along Barnegat Bay, curving eastward and crossing into Toms River, where the route splits into a block-wide one-way pair with two lanes and a bike lane in each direction that heads north through residential and commercial Ortley Beach. After crossing into Lavallette a mile later, the northbound direction of Route 35 becomes Grand Central Avenue and the southbound direction of Route 35 becomes Anna O. Hawkins Boulevard. The route then crosses back into Toms River, passing through Dover Beaches North. When Route 35 enters Brick Township, the northbound direction becomes Ocean Avenue and the one-way pair between the opposing directions of Route 35 narrows as it passes oceanfront residences. Upon crossing into Mantoloking, Route 35 becomes a two-lane, undivided road and heads north along a narrow peninsula, intersecting with Herbert Street (County Route 528, CR 528) less than a mile later.

Route 35 continues north through Bay Head, where the bike lanes end and the road name becomes Main Avenue. It then enters Point Pleasant Beach, a beach resort with a boardwalk, where the route swings to the west and crosses NJ Transit's North Jersey Coast Line. Southbound Route 35 intersects the eastern terminus of Route 88 before Route 35 turns north onto another one-way pair with two lanes in each direction—the northbound direction following Cincinnati Avenue and the southbound direction following Richmond Avenue. The one-way pair carries the route through the downtown area of Point Pleasant Beach, with the NJ Transit tracks parallel to the east. At the intersection of Arnold Avenue (CR 633), northbound Route 35 shifts slightly to the west and becomes Hawthorne Avenue, passing to the west of the Point Pleasant Beach Station serving the North Jersey Coast Line. The route becomes a two-way highway again after half a mile and becomes a four-lane divided highway after intersecting with Broadway (CR 635), almost immediately crossing a channel of the Manasquan River and entering Monmouth County.

=== Monmouth County ===
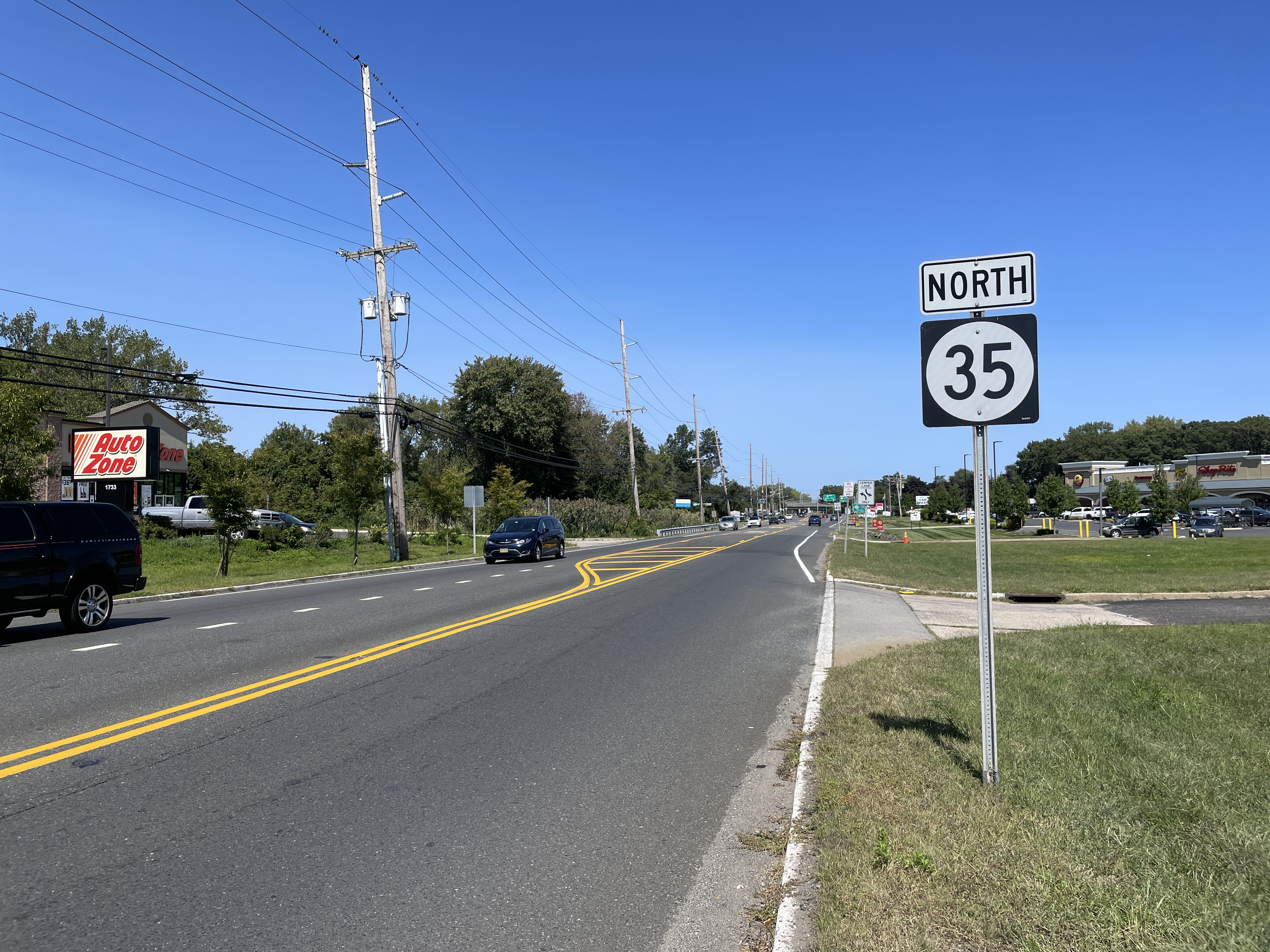
Route 35 northbound past CR 30 in Wall Township

Route 35 crosses into Brielle, Monmouth County, immediately passing over the main channel of the Manasquan River on a drawbridge. Upon crossing into Brielle, the route heads further west from the railroad tracks and intersects Ashley Avenue and the southern terminus of Route 71. The route continues northwest and crosses into Wall Township and meets the intersection of Route 34 and Route 70 at the former Brielle Circle, now an at-grade intersection with jughandles. Past this intersection, Route 35 heads north on a two-lane, undivided road that passes by many businesses. It meets the intersection of Atlantic Avenue (CR 524 Spur) at the Manasquan Circle, where the Circle Factory Outlet Center is located. Past the Manasquan Circle, Route 35 heads north as a three-lane road with a center left-turn lane that intersects with Allaire Road (CR 524). Route 35 widens to a four-lane divided highway and intersects the eastern terminus of Route 138, which continues west to become I-195. Route 35 curves to the east and crosses into Belmar where it becomes River Road. Here, the route runs along the south bank of the Shark River as a four-lane undivided highway, intersecting with H Street, where Route 71 heads to the south and running concurrently with that route. The two routes continue north along a divided highway until the intersection with 8th Avenue, where Route 71 heads to the east. Past this intersection, Route 35 becomes a four-lane, undivided road again, with the North Jersey Coast Line east of the road, and crosses the Shark River into Neptune Township.

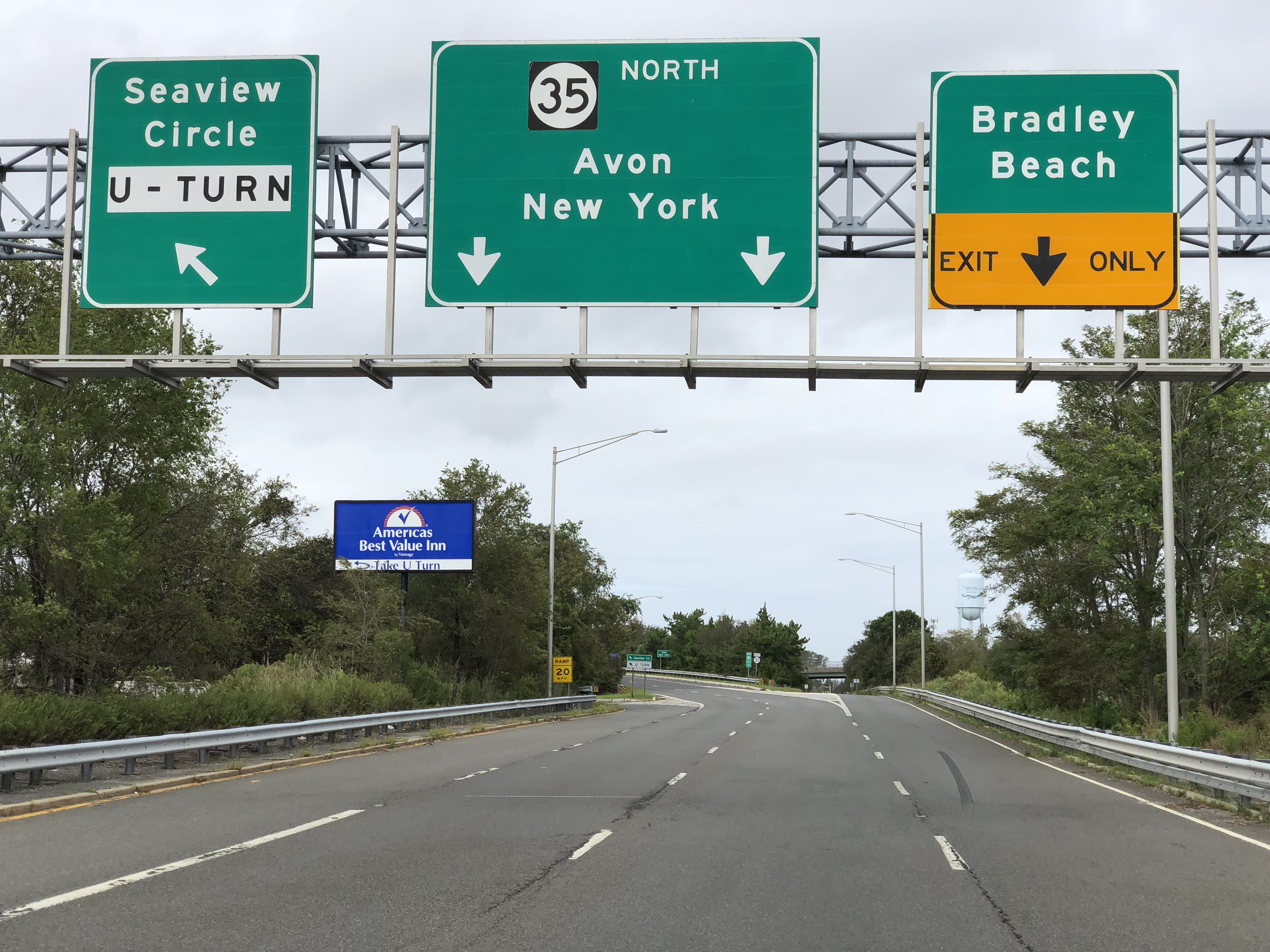
Route 35 just north of the Shark River bridge in Neptune Township

Past the Shark River bridge, Route 35 continues as a four-lane divided highway that features an interchange with Memorial Drive (CR 40A), crossing into Neptune City. The route continues northwest away from the railroad tracks through residential and commercial areas of Neptune City as a four-lane, undivided highway before heading north as a two-lane, undivided road. Route 35 crosses back into Neptune, where it crosses the intersection of Corlies Avenue (Route 33). It continues through suburban development and comes to the Asbury Park Circle where the route intersects with Asbury Avenue (CR 16), crosses into Ocean Township, and intersects with the eastern terminus of Route 66. The route becomes a four-lane divided highway and passes by the Seaview Square Mall as it continues north through commercial areas, intersecting many roads with jughandles and passing near Weltz County Park. Route 35 passes through the intersection of Talmadge Avenue.

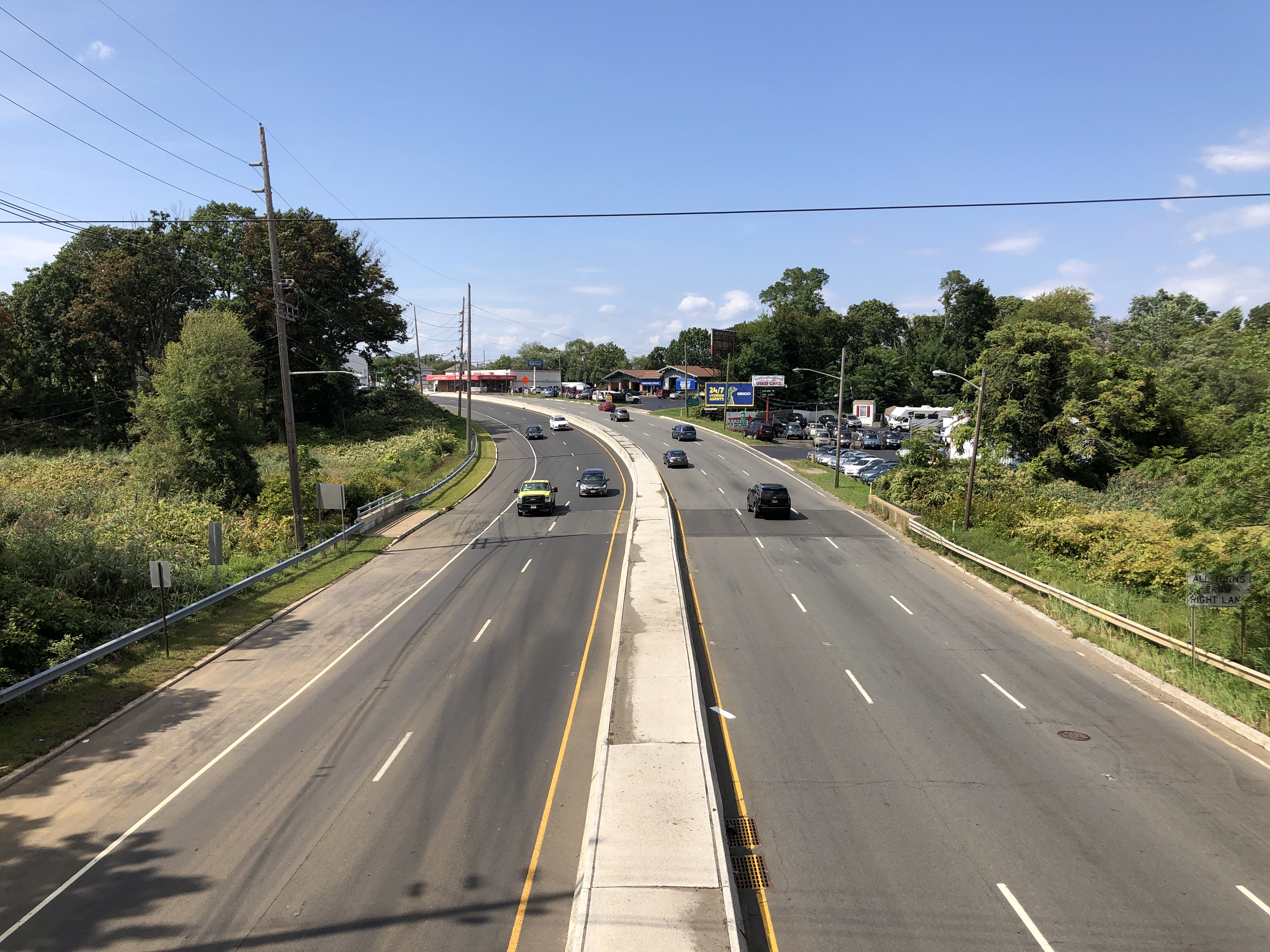
Route 35 northbound past interchange with Garden State Parkway and Route 36 in Keyport

Route 35 then enters Eatontown, where it passes by the Monmouth Mall and intersects with Route 36 at the former Eatontown Circle, now an at-grade intersection with ramps. After that intersection, the route becomes an undivided highway. Consequently, Route 35 passes through a few more roads and commercial areas before finally crossing the intersection of Wyckoff Road (CR 547). Past this intersection, Route 35 intersects with Broad Street (Route 71), where it becomes Main Street. The route has an intersection of Tinton Avenue (CR 537) next to the former entrance to Fort Monmouth. Route 35 crosses into Shrewsbury, where it becomes Broad Street and continues north through residential and commercial areas, passing by The Grove at Shrewsbury. It intersects with (CR 520), running concurrently with that route and immediately crossing the North Jersey Coast Line into Red Bank. Upon entering Red Bank, CR 520, along with CR 11, head north on Broad Street and Route 35 heads northwest on two-lane Maple Avenue, which turns north and passes by numerous homes. Route 35 splits from Maple Avenue, briefly head west on West Front Street, and rejoins on four-lane Riverside Avenue, where it heads northwest while the southbound direction follows Pearl Street and Water Street. Route 35 crosses the Navesink River into Middletown Township.

Past the Navesink River, the route runs along a four-lane, divided highway with a jersey barrier, passing through commercial areas. It crosses under Normandy Road, which serves as a road and railroad link between the two sections of Naval Weapons Station Earle. Along the northbound lanes of Route 35, just before the intersection of Kings Highway, stands the Evil Clown of Middletown, a large sign advertising a liquor store. A mixed-use complex, the Middletown Town Center, is also planned to be built in this area. The route intersects with Cherry Tree Farm Road (CR 516), running concurrently with that route as it enters Holmdel Township. The concurrency with CR 516 ends at the intersection with South Laurel Avenue, where that route heads to the north and CR 52 heads to the south on South Laurel Avenue. Route 35 continues west past numerous businesses and runs through Hazlet before crossing into Keyport. In Keyport, the route comes to an interchange with the northern terminus of Route 36 that also features access to the Garden State Parkway. Past this interchange, the road continues northwest and passes under the Henry Hudson Trail before it intersects with Nappi Place (CR 3), where it also features ramps to CR 516, which Route 35 passes under just to the north. Past this interchange, the road crosses the Matawan Creek into Aberdeen Township, where it heads northwest through Cliffwood and Cliffwood Beach.

=== Middlesex and Union counties ===
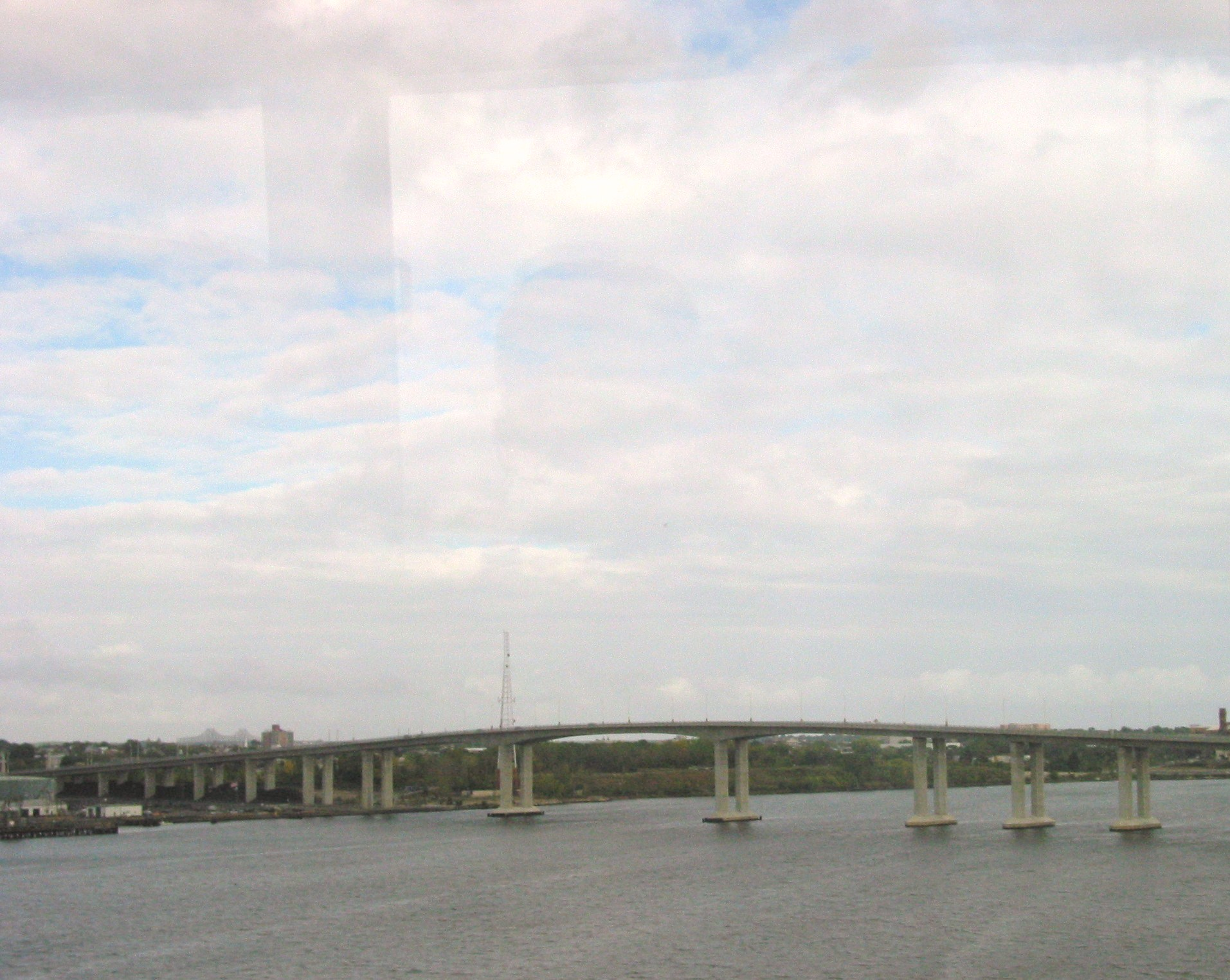
The Victory Bridge carrying Route 35 over the Raritan River

Route 35 crosses the Whale Creek into Old Bridge Township, Middlesex County, where it continues northwest through businesses and residences in Cliffwood Beach and Laurence Harbor, both sections of Old Bridge. It crosses the Cheesequake Creek on a drawbridge into Sayreville and turns to the west, passing over the North Jersey Coast Line. The road then intersects South Pine Avenue, which provides access to Bordentown Avenue (CR 615). Past this interchange, the route turns north and crosses into South Amboy, where Route 35 comes to an interchange and forms a concurrency with US 9. The two routes head through commercial areas and woodland, crossing over Conrail Shared Assets Operations' (CSAO) Amboy Secondary before interchanging with Raritan Street (CR 535) and Kearney Road, crossing back into Sayreville at the interchange with the former. US 9 and Route 35 split at an interchange (the former Victory Circle) that features access to the southbound direction of the Garden State Parkway by way of Chevalier Avenue, with Route 35 continuing north on a four-lane divided highway that passes through marshland and crosses the Raritan River on the Victory Bridge into Perth Amboy. In Perth Amboy, the route becomes four-lane, undivided Convery Boulevard upon crossing the intersection of Smith Street (CR 656).

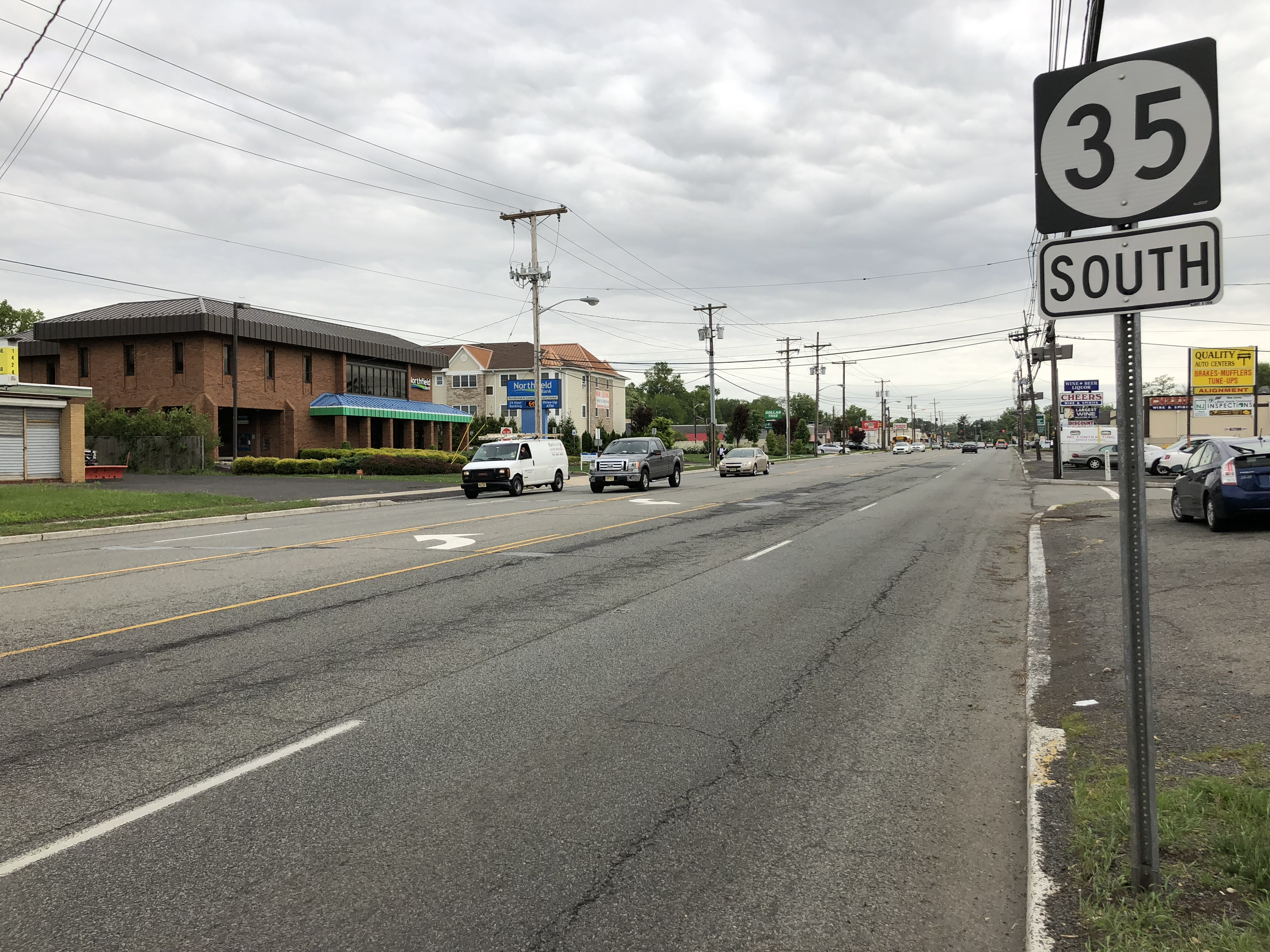
View south along Route 35 at Butler Street in Woodbridge

The route continues north through commercial and residential sections of Perth Amboy, crossing over a connector to Route 440 and CSAO's Perth Amboy Running Track line. It intersects the eastbound direction of Route 184, the former alignment of Route 440, before meeting the interchange of Route 440. Route 35 intersects the westbound direction of Route 184 and heads north, crossing into Woodbridge, where it becomes Amboy Avenue. In Woodbridge, the route passes by William Warren County Park and crosses over the New Jersey Turnpike (I-95). Past the New Jersey Turnpike (I-95), the road heads into residential neighborhoods, crossing the intersection of Main Street (CR 514. Route 35 merges onto St. Georges Avenue and crosses CSAO's Port Reading Secondary line before it comes to a partial cloverleaf interchange with US 1/9, after which the road passes homes and businesses, heading into Rahway, Union County just before crossing the Rahway River. Upon entering Rahway, Route 35 crosses under Amtrak's Northeast Corridor rail line just before ending at Lincoln Highway/St. Georges Avenue (Route 27). Route 27 continues north on St. Georges Avenue past the terminus of Route 35.

== History ==
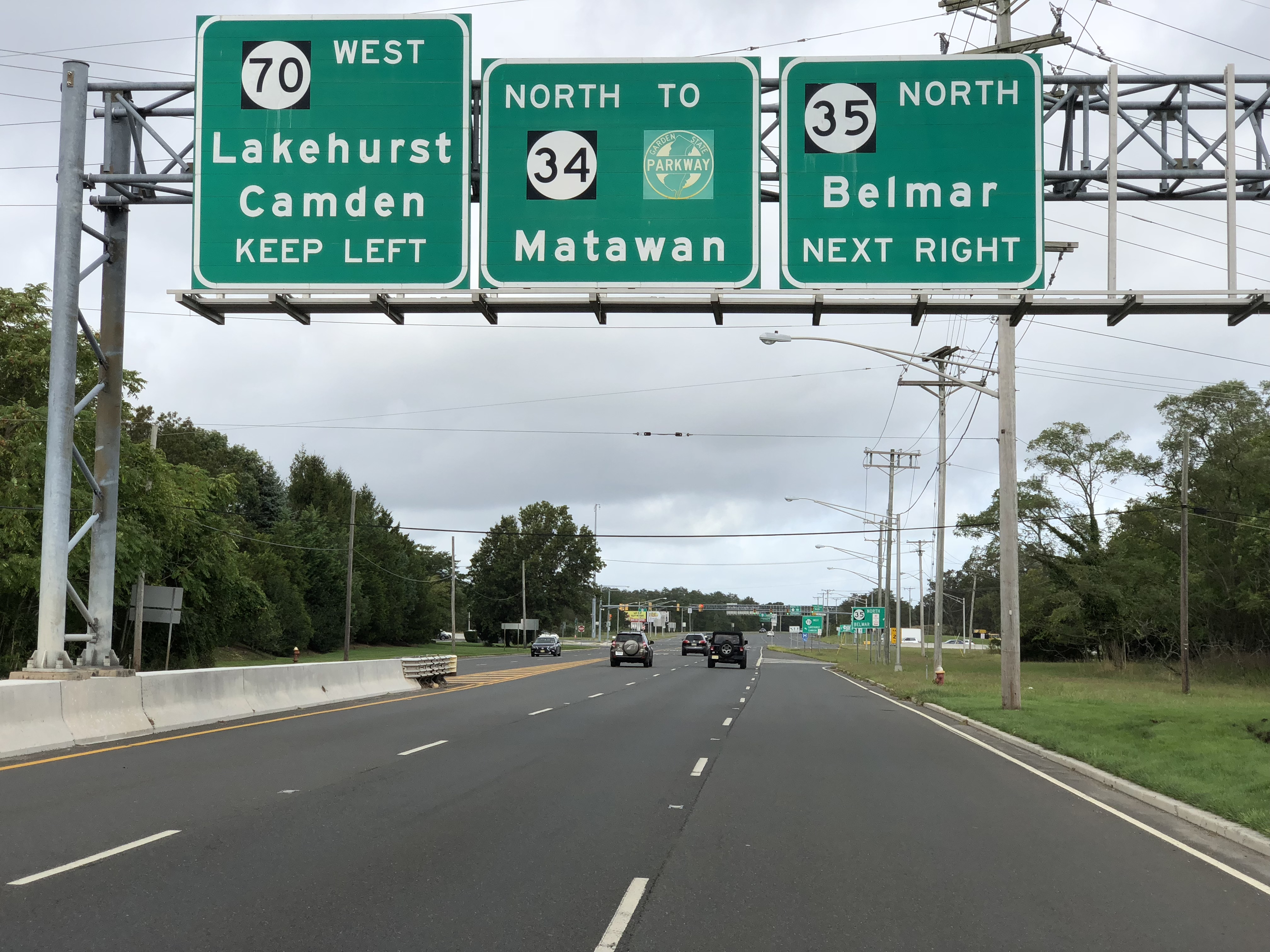
Route 35 northbound approaching the intersection with Route 34 and Route 70 in Wall Township, which was the Brielle Circle until 2001, when it was replaced with an at-grade intersection with jughandles.

The present-day alignment of Route 35 follows parts of many 19th-century turnpikes, including the Middletown Turnpike, chartered in 1866 to run from Middletown to Red Bank, the Middletown and Keyport Turnpike, which was chartered on March 15, 1859, to run from Middletown Township to Keyport, and the Red Bank and Eatontown Turnpike, chartered on February 9, 1865, along present-day Broad Street, CR 11, and Route 35. The road running from Perth Amboy to Keyport, and from Point Pleasant to Seaside Heights, was signed as part of the Jersey Coast Way, running from the Staten Island Ferry to Cape May.

In 1916, the current alignment of Route 35 was legislated as a part of pre-1927 Route 4 between Point Pleasant and Brielle and from Eatontown to South Amboy. In the 1927 New Jersey state highway renumbering, Route 35 was designated to run from Lakewood Township to South Amboy, replacing pre-1927 Route 4 from Lakewood Township to Belmar and from Eatontown to South Amboy with the portion of pre-1927 Route 4 between Belmar and Eatontown becoming Route 4N (now Route 71). At this time, US 9 followed the portions of Route 35 that were formerly a part of pre-1927 Route 4.

By the 1940s, Route 35 was designated onto its current alignment between Brielle and Belmar with the former alignment becoming a southern extension of Route 4N. US 9 was also moved off Route 35 onto a newly completed alignment of Route 4 between Lakewood Township and South Amboy. In 1947, Route 35 was extended north to end at Route 25 (now US 1) in Iselin, running concurrently with US 9. The current bridge over the Manasquan River and the bypass of Brielle were opened in 1951.

In the 1953 New Jersey state highway renumbering, the portion of Route 35 between Lakewood Township and Point Pleasant became Route 88, and Route 35 was designated to head south from Point Pleasant to Seaside Heights on what had been a part of Route 37. This section of Route 35 follows the right-of-way of the former Pennsylvania Railroad between Seaside Park and Mantoloking, which was removed in 1949. Also in the 1953 renumbering, the Route 35 designation was removed from the concurrency with US 9 between South Amboy and Iselin and reassigned to the former alignment of Route 4 between South Amboy and Route 27 in Rahway.

In the late 1950s, plans were made for a freeway along the Route 35 corridor between Seaside Heights and Long Branch to reduce congestion along the current route. This proposed freeway was built as Route 18 between Wall Township and Eatontown from 1965 to 1991 while the southern portion to Seaside Heights was never built. In the early 1970s, a Route 35 freeway was planned to run from Route 18 north to the planned Route 74 freeway in Matawan with an estimated cost of $53 million. This freeway was never built due to the cancellation of the Route 74 freeway in the mid-1970s.

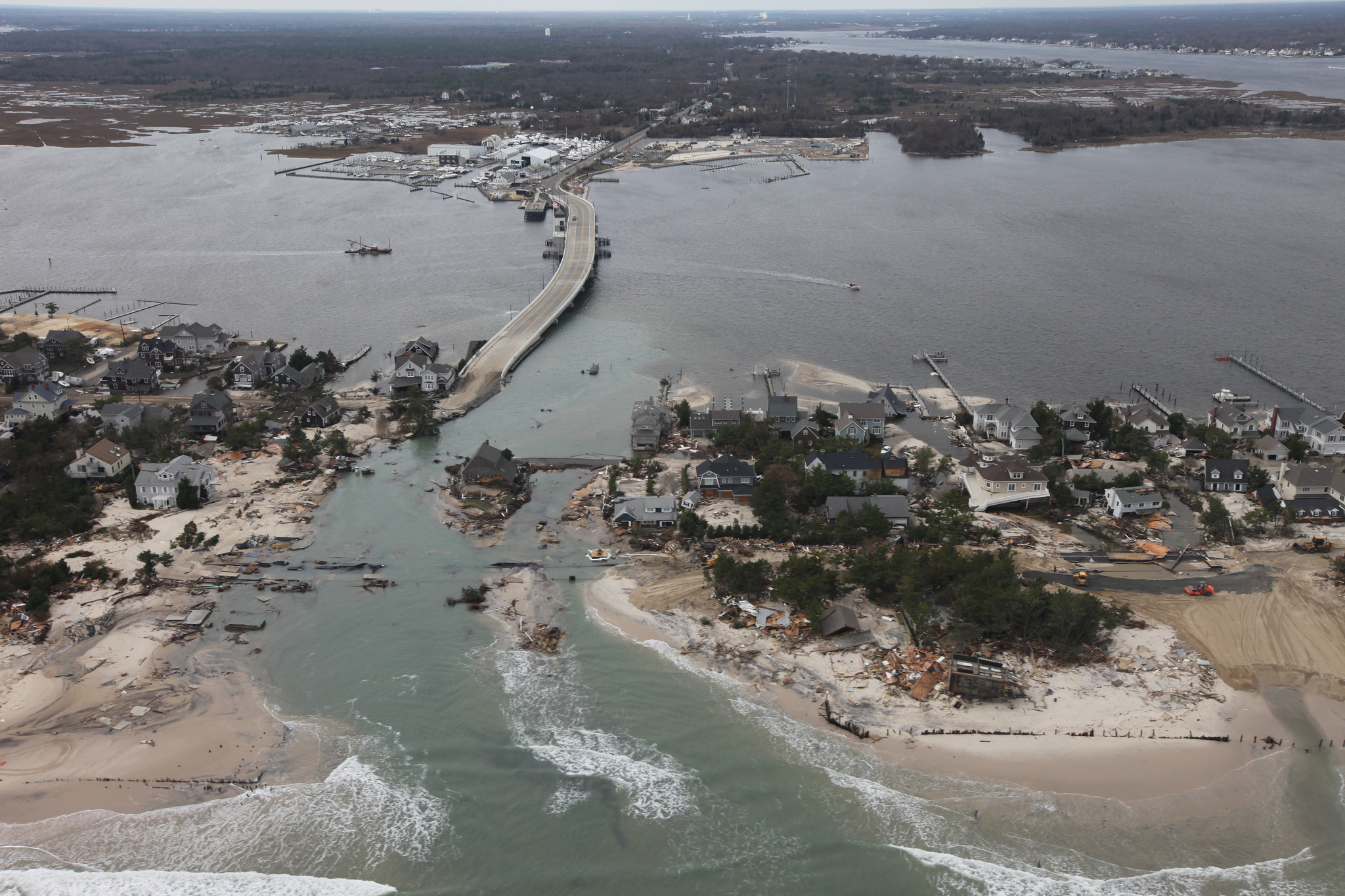
A breach occurred across Route 35 at CR 528 during Hurricane Sandy

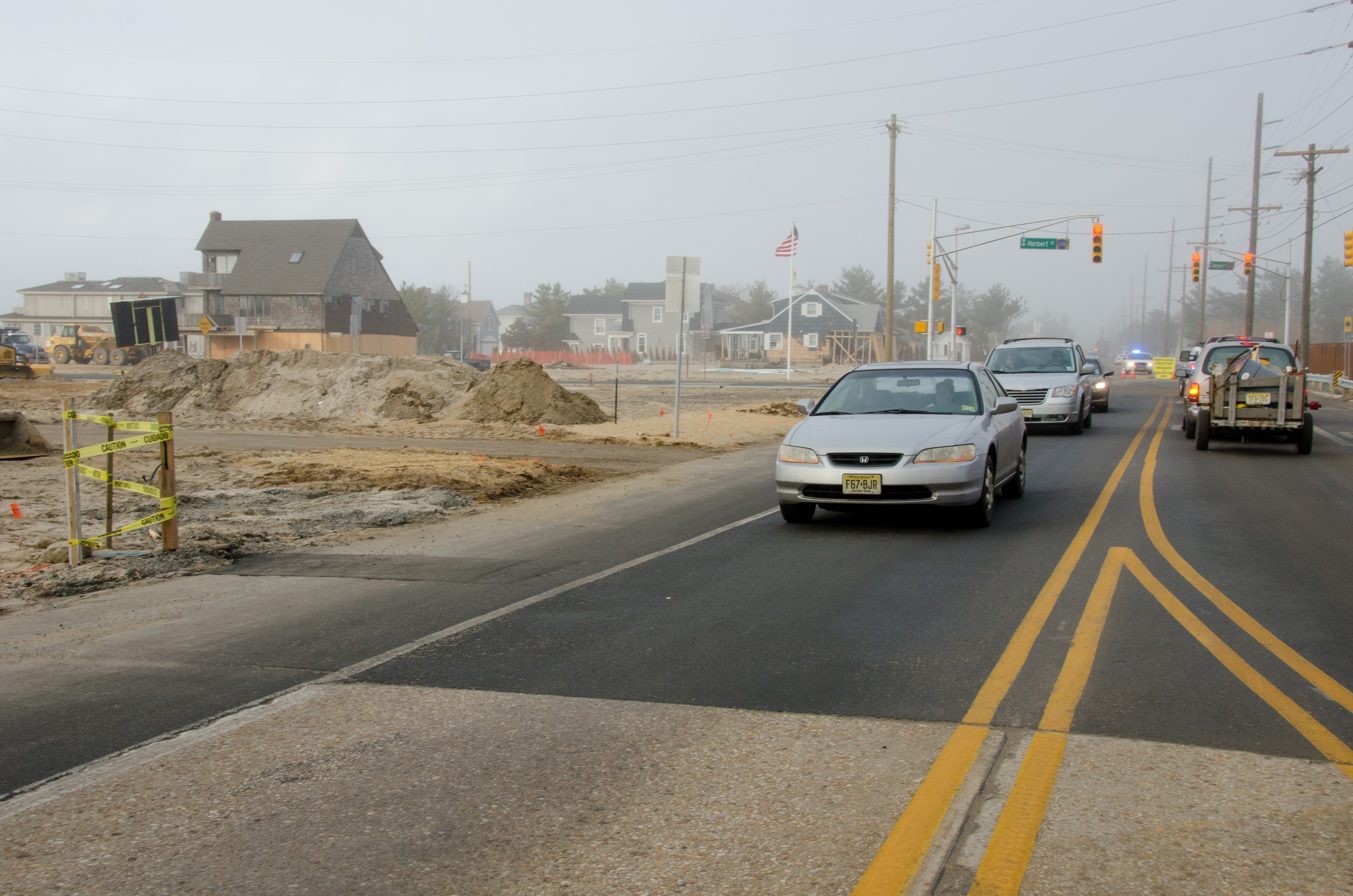
Route 35 reopened at the reconstructed CR 528 intersection in 2013

The current interchange with Route 37 and the bypass around Seaside Heights were completed in 1958. The highway was turned into a one-way pair between Brick and Seaside Heights in 1961 by utilizing the former right-of-way of the Pennsylvania Railroad.

The section of the route through downtown Point Pleasant Beach was turned into a one-way pair in 1967.

On April 16, 1980, NJDOT took over the road south from Seaside Heights to Island Beach State Park from Ocean County and extended State Highway 35 along it. In exchange, the county took over State Route 180 as County Route 50.

The Brielle Circle in Wall Township, which connected Route 34, Route 35, Route 70, was eliminated and replaced by an intersection in 2001, which were both converted into at-grade intersections with traffic lights.

From 2002 and 2005, the Victory Bridge over the Raritan River was reconstructed at a cost of $109 million.

The Victory Circle was replaced with a diamond interchange between 2003 and 2006.

Between February 2006 and November 2008, the Woodbridge Cloverleaf interchange with US 1/9 in Woodbridge Township, first cloverleaf interchange in the United States built in 1929 when this portion of Route 35 was still a part of Route 4, was replaced with a partial cloverleaf interchange, costing $34 million.

The interchange with Route 36 in Eatontown originally did not intersect at a 90-degree angle; this was a remainder from the original Eatontown Circle. However, this posed a significant safety problem, and the need to rebuild the intersection again was planned. Because of this, in April 2010, NJDOT initiated construction to relocate the intersection to allow for a straighter roadway and a full cloverleaf configuration around the interchange. The project was declared largely complete on June 29, 2012.

On February 1, 2013, Route 35 through Mantoloking was fully reopened after being closed since October 29, 2012, after Hurricane Sandy hit the area. The night of the storm at the intersection where the Mantoloking Bridge and Route 35 meet, a new inlet was formed by the raging storm waters. This effectively cut off the island from the mainland.

Beginning in March 2013 (after a six-month delay due to Hurricane Sandy), a four-year major construction project began on Route 35 between Raritan Boulevard/Birchwood Drive in Cliffwood Beach (Old Bridge Township) and Amboy Avenue in Aberdeen Township. The project includes several highway improvements designed to alleviate the flooding the highway is prone to due to its lowness and being adjacent in several areas to tidal marshes and Whale Creek and Long Neck Creek, widening of four intersections (Birchwood Drive, County Road, Cliffwood Avenue, and Amboy Avenue), and lane alignments, and additions for pedestrian and bicyclist safety. Also planned are traffic signal upgrades to reduce congestion. The project was expected to be completed in 2015.

In November 2020, construction was completed on a project to connect Taylor Lane with the CR 516 intersection in Middletown. This resulted in demolition of the former Jersey right that served that road northbound with a new diamond-styled jughandle.

== Major intersections ==
County	Location	mi	km	Destinations	Notes
Ocean	Berkeley Township	0.0	0.0	Island Beach State Park	Southern terminus
Ocean	Berkeley Township–Seaside Heights line	2.7	4.3	Route 37 west to G.S. Parkway – To Bridge, Toms River, Lakehurst	Interchange; eastern terminus of Route 37
Ocean	Berkeley Township–Seaside Heights line	2.7	4.3	Seaside Hts	Northbound exit; access via Sumner Avenue
Ocean	Mantoloking	9.9	15.9	CR 528 west (Herbert St) to G.S. Parkway – Lakewood	Eastern terminus of CR 528
Ocean	Point Pleasant Beach	12.9	20.8	Route 88 west – Lakewood	Eastern terminus of Route 88
Monmouth	Brielle	14.8	23.8	Brielle Business Ctr	Interchange; access via Ashley Avenue
Monmouth	Brielle	15.1	24.3	Route 71 north – Manasquan, Sea Girt	Interchange; southern terminus of Route 71
Monmouth	Wall Township	15.9	25.6	Route 34 north to G.S. Parkway – Matawan Route 70 west – Lakehurst, Camden	Former Brielle Circle; southern terminus of Route 34; eastern terminus of Route 70
Monmouth	Wall Township	17.1	27.5	CR 524 Spur (Atlantic Ave) – Farmingdale, Manasquan	Manasquan Circle; access to Manasquan Station
Monmouth	Wall Township	18.7	30.1	CR 524 (Allaire Rd) – Allaire, Spring Lake Business District	
Monmouth	Wall Township	20.2	32.5	Route 138 west to I-195 west – Trenton	Interchange; eastern terminus of Route 138; former Route 38
Monmouth	Belmar	21.0	33.8	Route 71 south (H St) – Spring Lake, Sea Girt	Southern end of the concurrency with Route 71
Monmouth	Belmar	21.4	34.4	Route 71 north (8th Ave)	Northern end of the concurrency with Route 71
Monmouth	Neptune Township	21.9	35.2	Bradley Beach, Avon	Interchange; access via CR 40A / CR 17
Monmouth	Neptune Township	23.4	37.7	Route 33 (Corlies Ave) – Freehold, Ocean Grove	
Monmouth	Ocean Township	24.8	39.9	Route 66 west to G.S. Parkway – Freehold, Trenton Asbury Park	Asbury Park Circle; eastern terminus of Route 66
Monmouth	Eatontown	29.3	47.2	Route 36 to Route 18 / G.S. Parkway – Long Branch, Tinton Falls	Former Eatontown Circle
Monmouth	Eatontown	29.6	47.6	CR 547 (Wyckoff Rd)	
Monmouth	Eatontown	30.4	48.9	Route 71 south (Broad St) – Oceanport	Northern terminus of Route 71
Monmouth	Eatontown	30.6	49.2	CR 537 (Tinton Ave/Ave of Memories) – Colts Neck	
Monmouth	Shrewsbury	32.8	52.8	CR 520 west (Newman Springs Rd) to G.S. Parkway – Freehold	Southern end of the concurrency with CR 520; to Thompson Park
Monmouth	Red Bank	32.9	52.9	CR 520 east (Broad St) – Rumson	Northern end of the concurrency with CR 520
Monmouth	Middletown Township	39.4	63.4	CR 516 east (Cherry Tree Farm Rd) – N Middletown, New Monmouth Taylor Ln	Southern end of the concurrency with CR 516
Monmouth	Holmdel Township	39.8	64.1	CR 516 west (Laurel Ave) – Keansburg CR 52 south (S Laurel Ave)	Northern end of the concurrency with CR 516 Northern terminus of CR 52
Monmouth	Keyport	43.1	69.4	Route 36 south / G.S. Parkway – Keyport, Keansburg, Sandy Hook	No access from Route 36 to Route 35 southbound or from Route 35 northbound to Route 36; interchange, Exit 117 (Garden State Parkway)
Monmouth	Keyport	43.8	70.5	CR 516 – Keyport, Matawan	Interchange
Middlesex	Sayreville	48.0	77.2	Bordentown Ave – South Amboy Business Dist	Interchange; northbound access via South Pine Avenue; southbound access via Catherine Street in South Amboy
Middlesex	South Amboy	49.3	79.3	US 9 south – Freehold, Atlantic City	Southern end of the concurrency with US 9; interchange
Middlesex	South Amboy	50.0	80.5	Raritan St – Sayreville, Parlin	Interchange; access via CR 535 south
Middlesex	Sayreville	50.4	81.1	Kearney Rd	Interchange
Middlesex	Sayreville	50.6	81.4	US 9 north to G.S. Parkway north / N.J. Turnpike G.S. Parkway south	Northern end of the concurrency with US 9; Exit 125 (Garden State Parkway); interchange
Middlesex	Raritan River	51.7	83.2	Victory Bridge	
Middlesex	Perth Amboy	53.2	85.6	Route 184 (Harding Ave)	Eastbound direction and eastern terminus of Route 184
Middlesex	Perth Amboy	53.3	85.8	Route 440 to I-95 / N.J. Turnpike – Outerbridge Crossing, Staten Island	Interchange
Middlesex	Perth Amboy	53.3	85.8	Route 184 west	Westbound direction and eastern terminus of Route 184
Middlesex	Woodbridge Township	55.0	88.5	CR 514 (Main St)	
Middlesex	Woodbridge Township	56.4	90.8	US 1-9 – Newark, Trenton, Shore Pts	Interchange
Union	Rahway	58.0	93.3	Route 27 (Lincoln Hwy/St. Georges Ave)	Northern terminus
1.000 mi = 1.609 km; 1.000 km = 0.621 mi: Concurrency terminus; Incomplete access
