= County Route 516 (New Jersey) =

County highway in New Jersey, U.S.

County Route 516
- CR 516 highlighted in red, spur routes in blue

Route information
- Maintained by Middlesex County, Monmouth County, NJDOT
- Length: 19.27 mi (31.01 km)
- Existed: January 1, 1953–present

Major junctions
- West end: Route 18 / CR 527 in Old Bridge Township
- US 9 in Old Bridge Township; Route 79 in Matawan; Route 34 in Matawan; Route 35 in Keyport; Route 36 in Hazlet; Route 35 in Holmdel Township
- East end: Route 36 in Middletown Township

Location
- Country: United States
- State: New Jersey
- Counties: Middlesex, Monmouth

Highway system
- County routes in New Jersey; 500-series routes
← CR 515	→ CR 517
← CR 40A	→ CR 43

County Route 516 (CR 516) is a county highway in the U.S. state of New Jersey.

== Route description ==
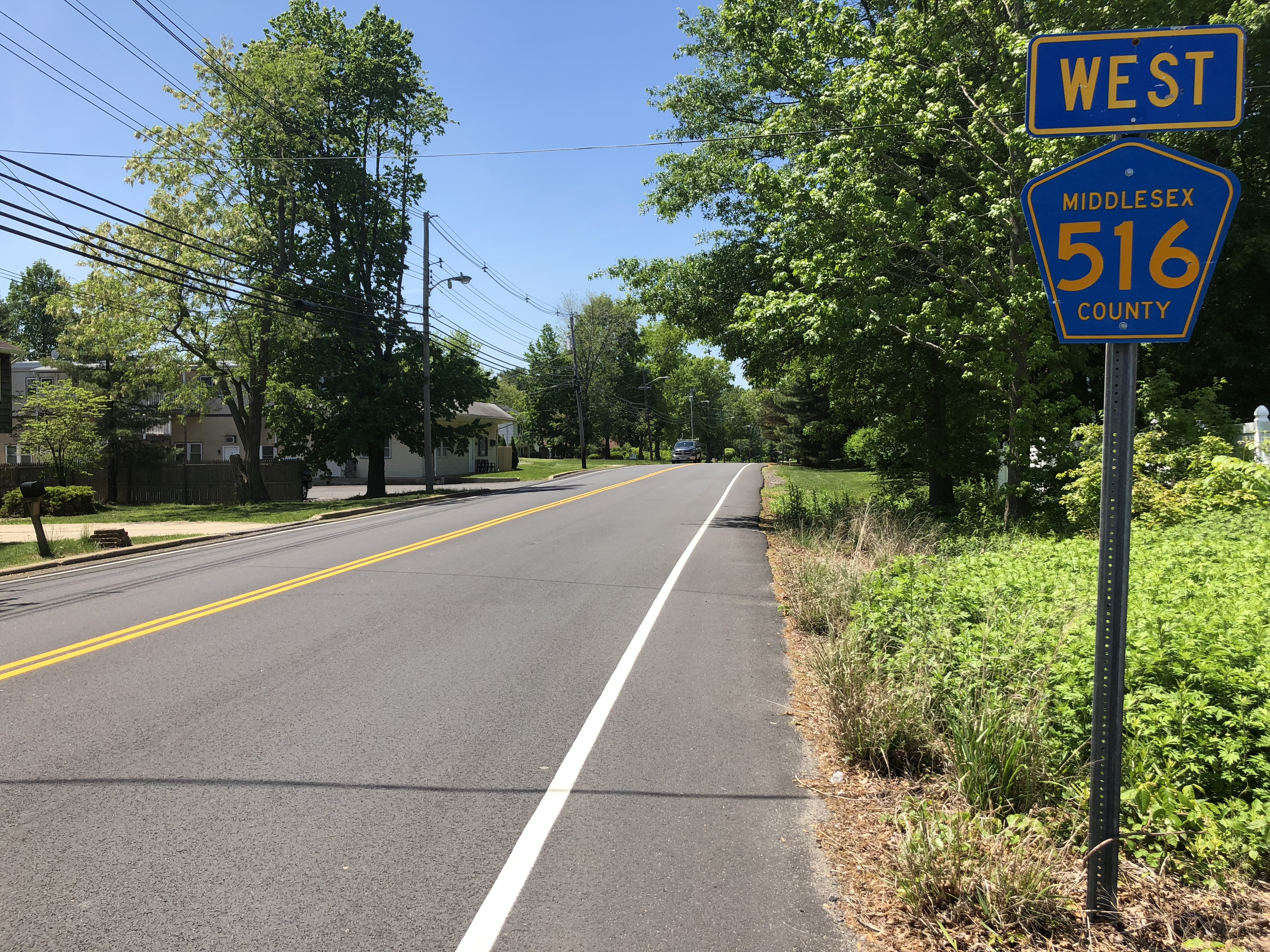
View west along CR 516 at Amboy Road (CR 645) in Old Bridge Township

The highway extends 19.2 miles (30.9 km) from Route 18/CR 527 in Old Bridge Township to Route 36 in Middletown Township. It is known as Old Bridge-Matawan Road for its entire length in Old Bridge where it intersectins U.S. Route 9 (US 9), and then continues several more miles to the Old Bridge Township–Matawan border, where it enters Monmouth County. There it is known as New Brunswick Avenue and forms part of the boundary between Matawan and Aberdeen Township before fully entering Matawan. After crossing the intersection of Main Street (Route 79) it is known as Broad Street and continues past Route 34 to another intersection of Main Street (CR 516 Spur). From there it follows Main Street north into Aberdeen where it is known as Lower Main Street; the name changes again upon entering Keyport where it becomes Maple Place.

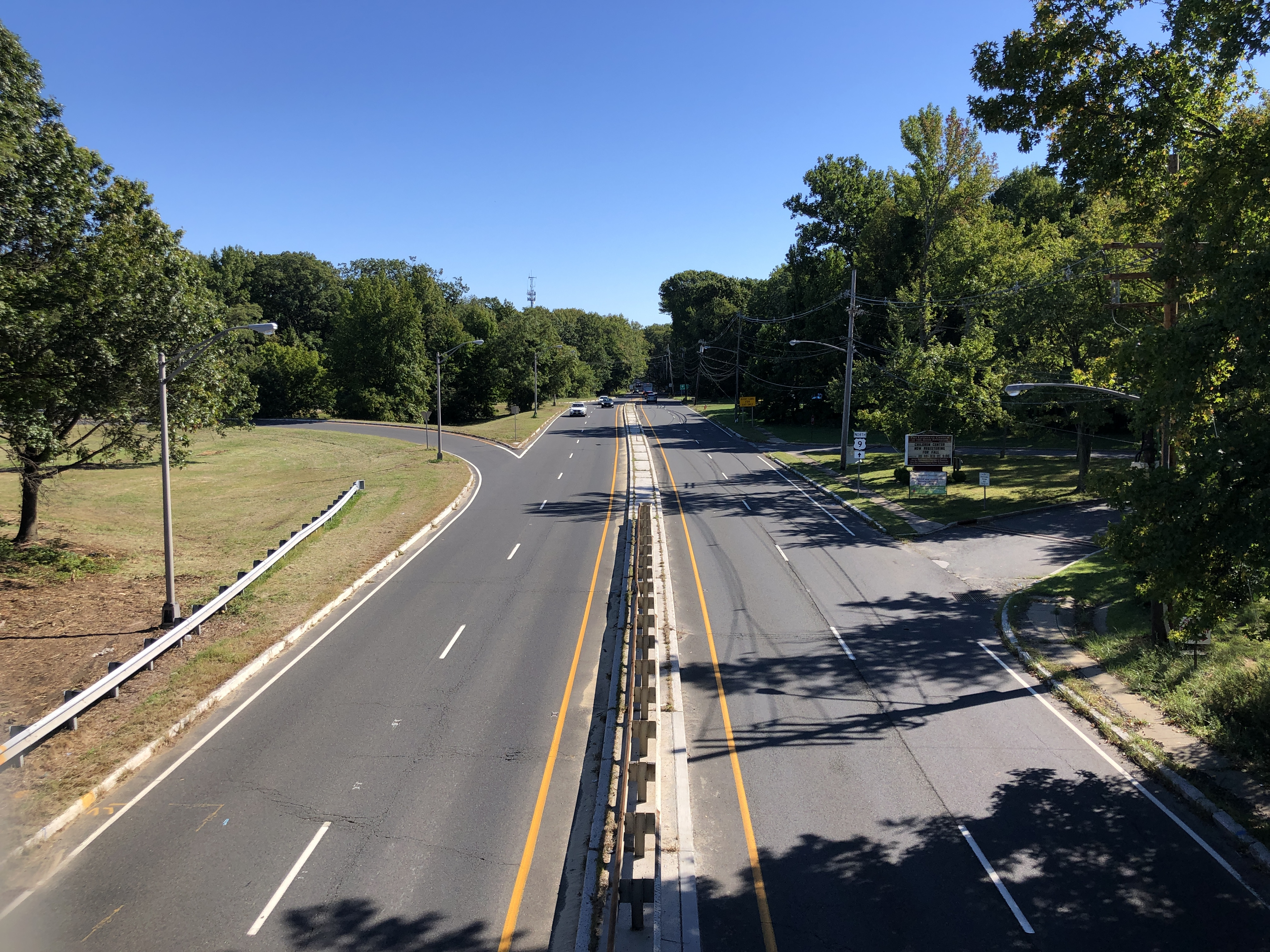
View eastbound along CR 516 from US 9 in Old Bridge Township

In Keyport, CR 516 has a grade-separated interchange with Route 35; part of this 1965 alignment follows West 4th Street before rejoining Maple Place and following it to Green Grove Avenue. Turning east on Green Grove Avenue, CR 516 bridges Chingarora Creek and enters Hazlet where it is known as Middle Road, which intersects with Route 36 and continues into Holmdel Township to the intersection of Laurel Avenue. It turns briefly south on Laurel Avenue, then has its second intersection with Route 35. Running concurrently with Route 35 into Middletown Township, CR 516 then turns onto Cherry Tree Farm Road and continues along that alignment to Leonardville Road, which it follows to its eastern terminus at the intersection of Route 36 in Middletown Township.

== County Route 516 Spur ==
A segment of Main Street in Downtown Matawan—one block west of Broad Street (mainline CR 516)—is maintained by the county as a segment of CR 516 Spur. On most county-maintained traffic signals along Main Street, it is signed as CR 516 though the signal at the intersection of Little Street signs the road as "CR 516S". The street extends 0.9 miles (1.4 km) from the intersection of Route 79 and Route 34 to the intersection of Main and Broad streets.

Another 0.3-mile-long (0.48 km) spur consists of Green Grove Avenue between Maple Place and 1st Street (CR 6). Though heading west from Route 35 shows CR 516 making a left onto Maple Place, one CR 516 reassurance marker (without a spur plaque) appears at Green Grove Avenue's intersection with 1st Street.

== History ==
West of Matawan, the road was maintained by the Middlesex and Monmouth Turnpike Company.

Before the county route system, the road from Keyport to Atlantic Highlands was part of the Jersey Coast Way, which ran from the Staten Island Ferry to Cape May. CR 516 was established in 1952 as a part of the 500 Series system. It incorporated part of CR 3-R-14 in Middlesex County between Old Bridge Township and the Monmouth County line. From Old Bridge Township to its junction with Route 4 (now Route 79), CR 516 ran concurrently with Route S28, although always a county road. In 1953, Route S28 was renumbered as Route 18; the concurrency ended when Route 18 was realigned to the south. From the Monmouth County line it absorbed part of CR 6 through Matawan and Aberdeen Township to Keyport. There it superseded CR 42 in its entirety. CR 42 consisted of Maple Place in Keyport between Route 35 and Green Grove Avenue. CR 42 was taken over as a county highway by resolution of the Board of Chosen Freeholders on June 21, 1939. Since 1952, no route in Monmouth County has been designated as CR 42. From CR 42, it continued east from Keyport east through Hazlet, Holmdel and Middletown townships. It used a part of CR 7 to its terminus.

CR 516 Alternate was previously the designation of Broad Street in Matawan, but was never signed differently than the parent route. Initially both Main and Broad streets were designated as CR 516. Broad Street was then briefly renumbered as CR 516 Alternate, and Main Street remained as the main stem. When CR 516 was rerouted from Main Street to Broad Street, and Main Street renumbered as CR 516 Spur, CR 516 Alternate ceased to exist.

== Major intersections ==
County	Location	mi	km	Destinations	Notes
Middlesex	Old Bridge Township	0.00– 0.09	0.00– 0.14	Route 18 / CR 527 south to N.J. Turnpike – Englishtown, Freehold Township, New Brunswick	Western terminus; interchange, access to Route 18 northbound and from Route 18 southbound; western end of the CR 527 concurrency
Middlesex	Old Bridge Township	0.32	0.51	CR 527 north (Old Matawan Road)	Eastern end of the CR 527 concurrency
Middlesex	Old Bridge Township	3.10	4.99	US 9 – The Amboys, Freehold Township	Interchange
Monmouth	Matawan	6.90	11.10	Route 79 (Main Street) to G.S. Parkway	
Monmouth	Matawan	7.19	11.57	Route 34 – The Amboys, Point Pleasant	
Monmouth	Keyport	9.22	14.84	Route 35 – The Amboys, Red Bank	Interchange
Monmouth	Hazlet	10.79	17.36	Route 36 to G.S. Parkway – Highlands, The Amboys	
Monmouth	Holmdel Township	13.89	22.35	Route 35 north – Keyport, South Amboy	Western end of the Route 35 concurrency
Monmouth	Middletown Township	14.32	23.05	Route 35 south – Red Bank	Eastern end of the Route 35 concurency
Monmouth	Middletown Township	19.27	31.01	Route 36 south	Eastern terminus; access to Route 36 south from Route 36 north only
1.000 mi = 1.609 km; 1.000 km = 0.621 mi: Concurrency terminus; Incomplete access
