= Calhoun Street Extension =

Series of roads in New Jersey, US

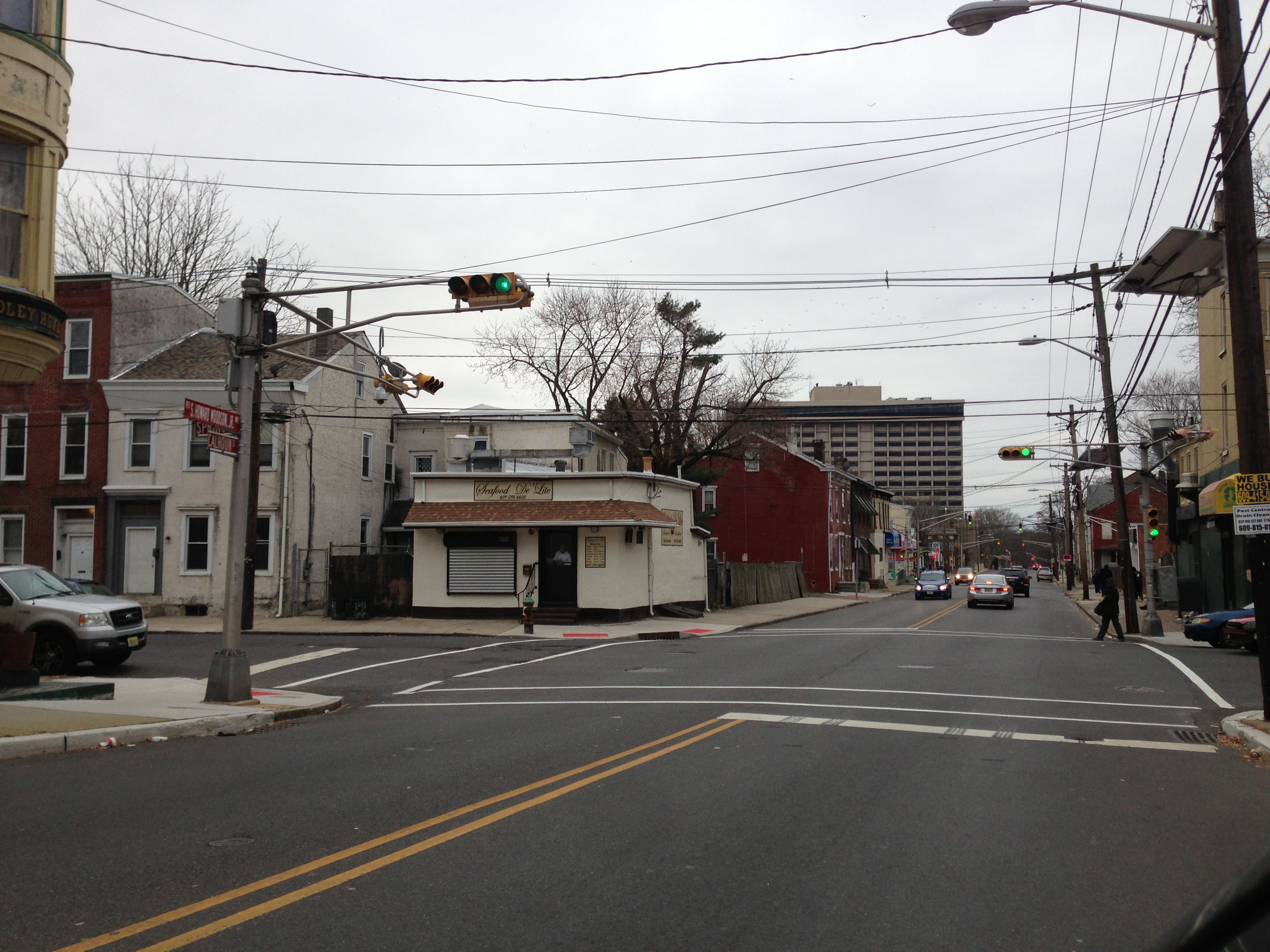
- Calhoun Street in the Central West section of Trenton
- Location: Trenton, NJ
- South end: Calhoun Street Bridge in Trenton
- Major junctions: Route 29 in Trenton; Route 31 in Trenton US 206 / US 1 Bus. in Trenton
- North end: US 206 / US 1 Bus. in Lawrence Township

The Calhoun Street Extension is a series of roads in Trenton, New Jersey, and nearby Lawrence Township. It runs from the Calhoun Street Bridge over the Delaware River to Brunswick Circle, and is composed of the following named streets:

- Calhoun Street
- Part of Princeton Avenue
- Brunswick Circle Extension

The Extension was built as a joint undertaking by the New Jersey State Highway Commission, the city of Trenton and Mercer County; it opened in January 1932. New roads built were the Brunswick Circle Extension and the northeast part of Calhoun Street; the rest of Calhoun Street and Princeton Avenue existed before the road was built. Princeton Avenue was already maintained by the county; the rest was taken over by the state.

The road was intended as a bypass of Downtown Trenton for cars and light trucks; the Calhoun Street Bridge had and still has a low weight limit. It may have been part of Route 26, which continued north from Brunswick Circle. On the Pennsylvania side of the Delaware River, the road from the bridge rejoined the Lincoln Highway to Philadelphia at Fallsington. On the New Jersey side, the Lincoln Highway ran through Brunswick Circle, and the new Route 26 to New Brunswick, built in 1930, began at the Circle.

In the 1950s, it was numbered as part of County Route 583 except along the Brunswick Circle Extension; it now has the following numbers:

- County Route 653 along Calhoun Street
- County Route 583 and southbound U.S. Route 206 (also signed as southbound U.S. Route 1 Business) along Princeton Avenue
- County Route 645 (also signed as southbound US 206 and Business US 1; US 206 southbound officially stays with Princeton Avenue and Business US 1 southbound isn't officially there) along Brunswick Circle Extension.

The Extension has been supplanted by U.S. Route 1, which also connects Brunswick Circle to the Delaware River.
