= List of highways numbered S26 =

Route 26 may refer to:

- New Jersey Route S26
- County Route S26 (California)
