= New Jersey Route 26 =

State highway in New Jersey, US

Route 26
- Livingston Avenue

Route information
- Maintained by NJDOT
- Length: 2.54 mi (4.09 km)
- Existed: 1927–present

Major junctions
- South end: US 1 in North Brunswick
- North end: CR 691 in New Brunswick

Location
- Country: United States
- State: New Jersey
- Counties: Middlesex

Highway system
- New Jersey State Highway Routes; Interstate; US; State; Scenic Byways
| ← Route 25 | → Route 27 |

Route 26 is a state highway in New Jersey, United States, running 2.54 miles (4.09 km) along Livingston Avenue from U.S. Route 1 (US 1) in North Brunswick Township northeast to Nassau Street at the border of New Brunswick. Prior to the 1953 renumbering, the route continued southwest along US 1 to Trenton. Livingston Avenue inside New Brunswick, southwest of Suydam Street, is the 1.08-mile (1.74 km) County Route 691 (CR 691). The 0.39 miles (0.63 km) from Suydam Street to its end at George Street is part of Route 171, also maintained by Middlesex County.

Route 26 originates as the alignment of the Trenton and New Brunswick Turnpike, chartered in 1803 from Warren and Green Streets in Trenton to New Brunswick. The turnpike lasted for 99 years, fighting with railroads, canals and stagecoaches to stay in business. The road was designated State Highway Route 26 in the 1927 state highway renumbering, running from the state line in Trenton to State Highway Route S-28 in New Brunswick along the turnpike and Livingston Avenue. The route remained intact, becoming part of an engineering feat meant for the safety of drivers. In 1952, the route became part of the Trenton Freeway until the Route 26 designation was truncated back to North Brunswick Township in the 1953 state highway renumbering. The route was further truncated back from Route 18 in the 1970s in New Brunswick to its current northern terminus at Nassau Street.

== Route description ==
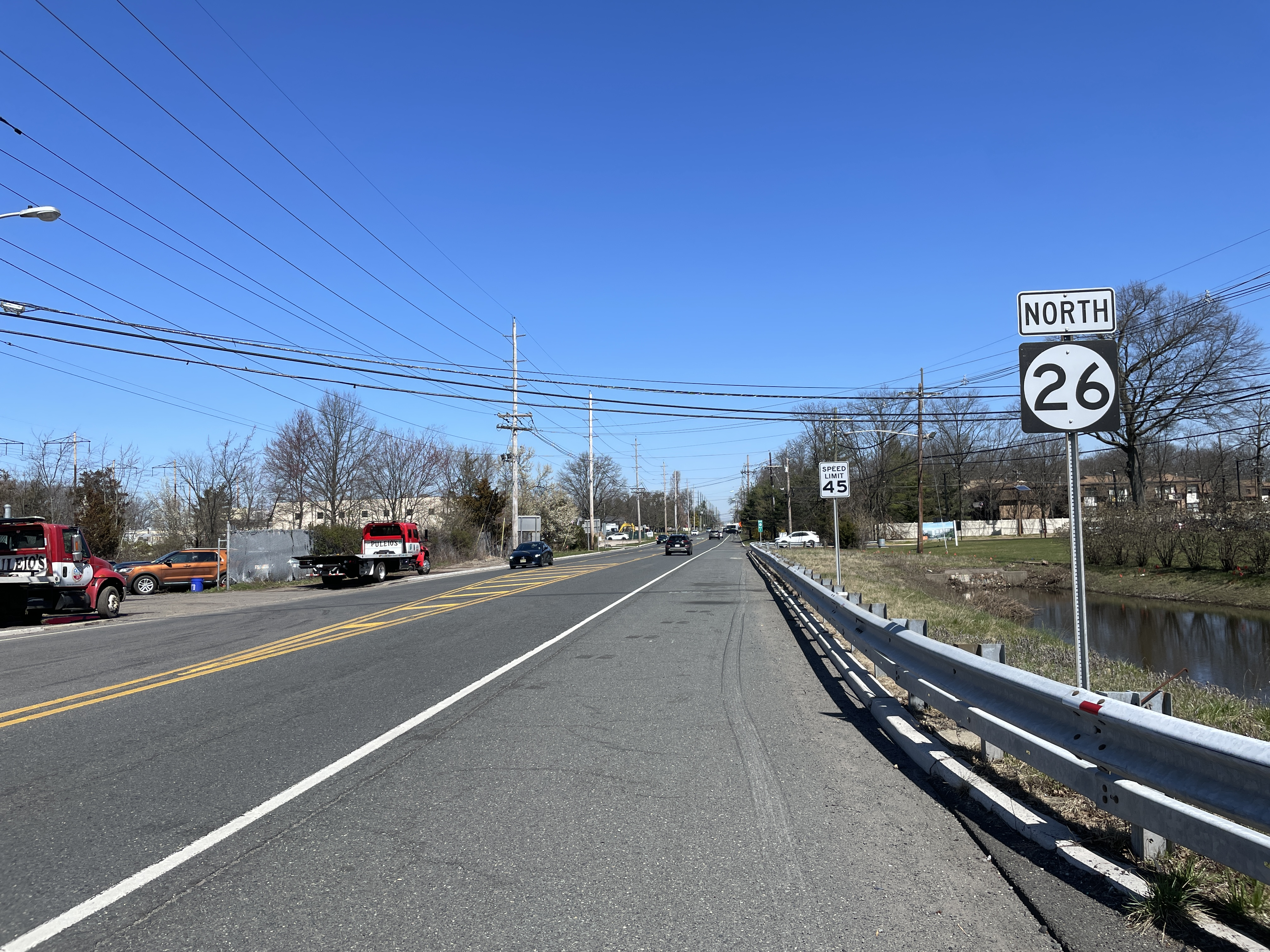
Route 26 northbound past its beginning at US 1 in North Brunswick Township

Route 26 begins at an interchange with US 1 in North Brunswick Township. The roadway heads westward as the Livingston Avenue Extension, crossing south of a pond and to the north a car dealership. Approaching Amtrak's Northeast Corridor railroad line, Route 26 curves to the north, crossing under US 1 and paralleling Route 91 (Jersey Avenue). Passing to the east of a railroad fork, Route 26 parallels the Northeast Corrdior tracks as Livingston Avenue, crossing through an industrial area and intersecting with the Route 26 Connector soon after. The highway continues to the west of an industrial and commercial park and continues northward, crossing the commercial district of North Brunswick. The roadway then intersects North Oaks Boulevard, which connects Route 26 and Route 1 via a residential complex.

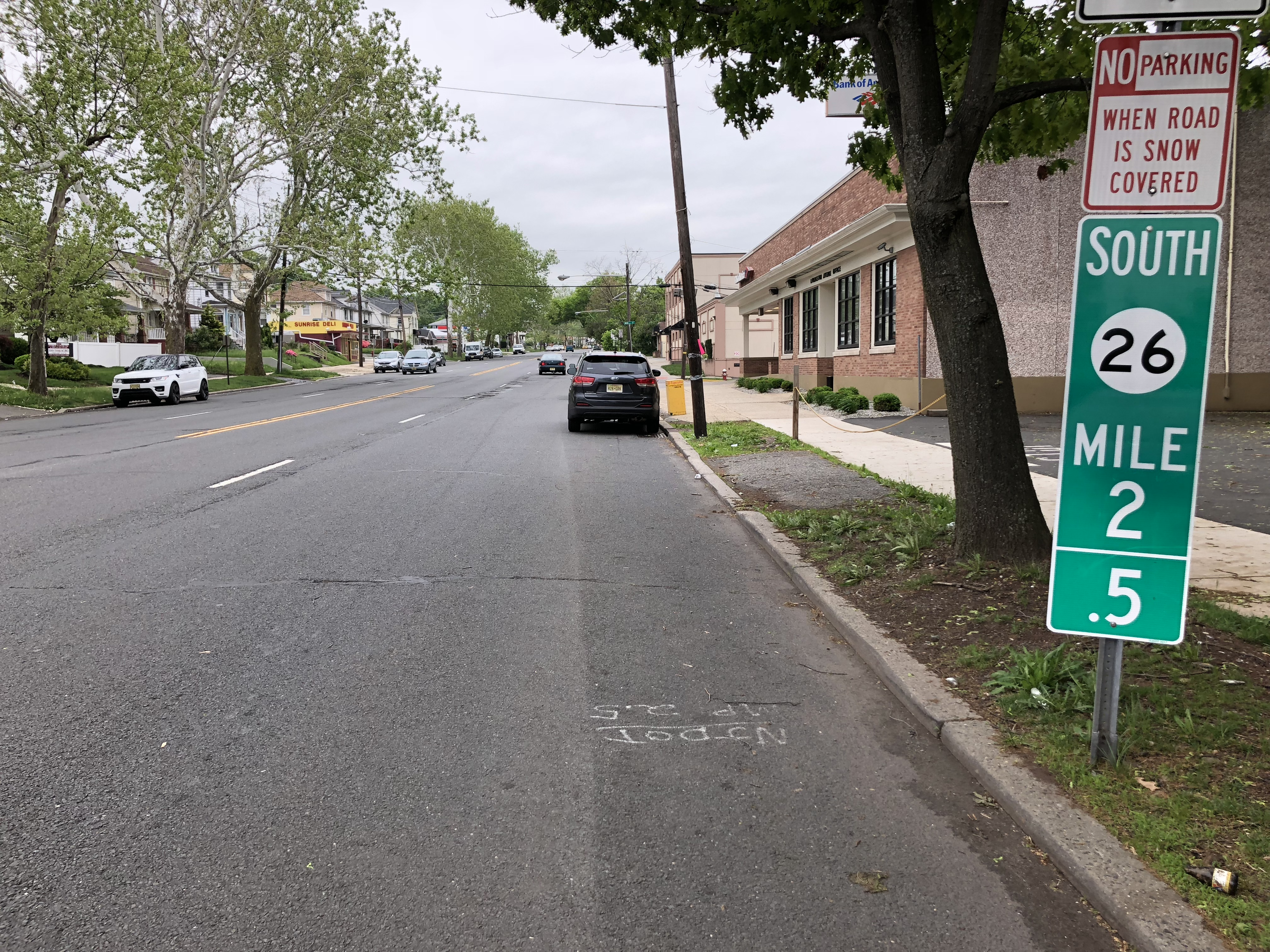
Route 26 southbound past its beginning at Nassau Street on the border of North Brunswick Township and New Brunswick

Running northward through the commercial district, Route 26 enters a more residential region around the intersection with Jessica Lane. The highway continues northward, intersecting with Middlesex County Route 680 (How Lane) at a traffic light a short distance later. Route 26 continues northward along Livingston Avenue, passing to the east of residential homes and to the west of commercial businesses. The route enters the northernmost business area of North Brunswick, intersecting with local roads along with passing a large number of businesses. After continuing down the business strip, Route 26 intersects with 14th Street and Hermann Road at a traffic light. Hermann Road heads eastward towards the town hall and Route 171. Livingston Avenue continues northward, crossing through industrial, commercial and residential districts in rapid succession. At the intersection with 12th Street, the highway enters New Brunswick. Entering another residential district, Route 26 intersects with Nassau Street, where the state-maintenance and designation ends. Livingston Avenue, which was previously designated Route 26, continues under the designation of CR 691.

== History ==
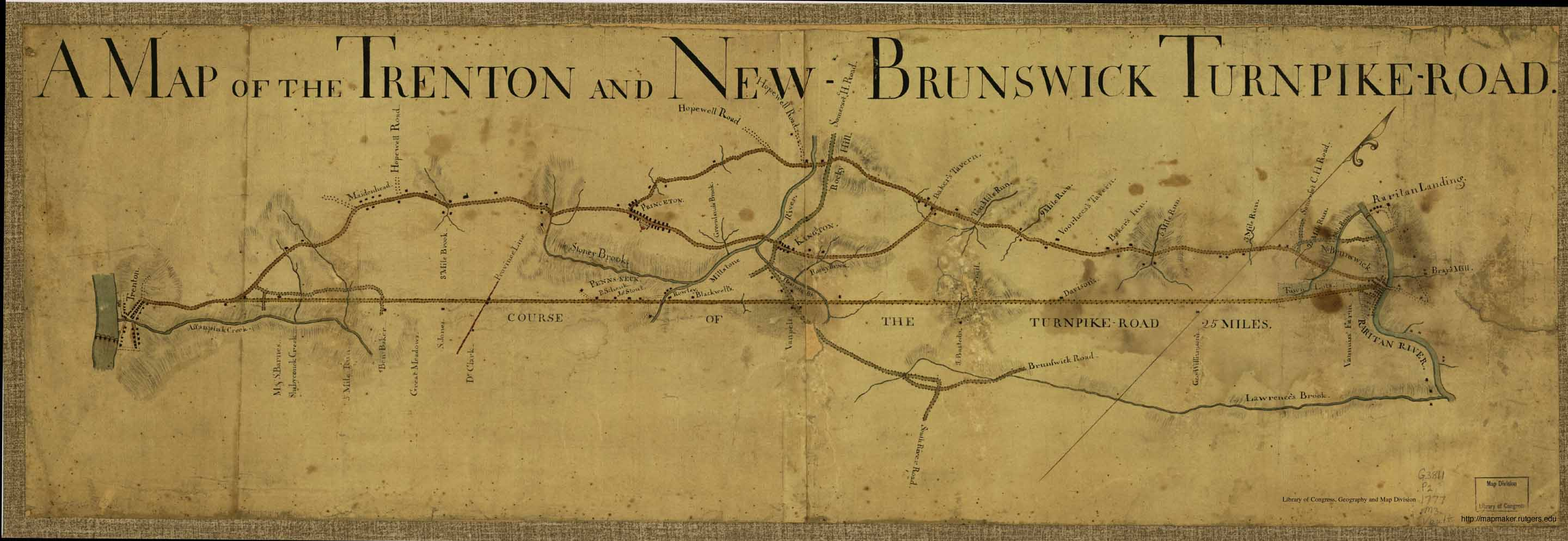
The layout for the then-proposed Trenton and New Brunswick Turnpike Road

=== Trenton and New Brunswick Turnpike ===
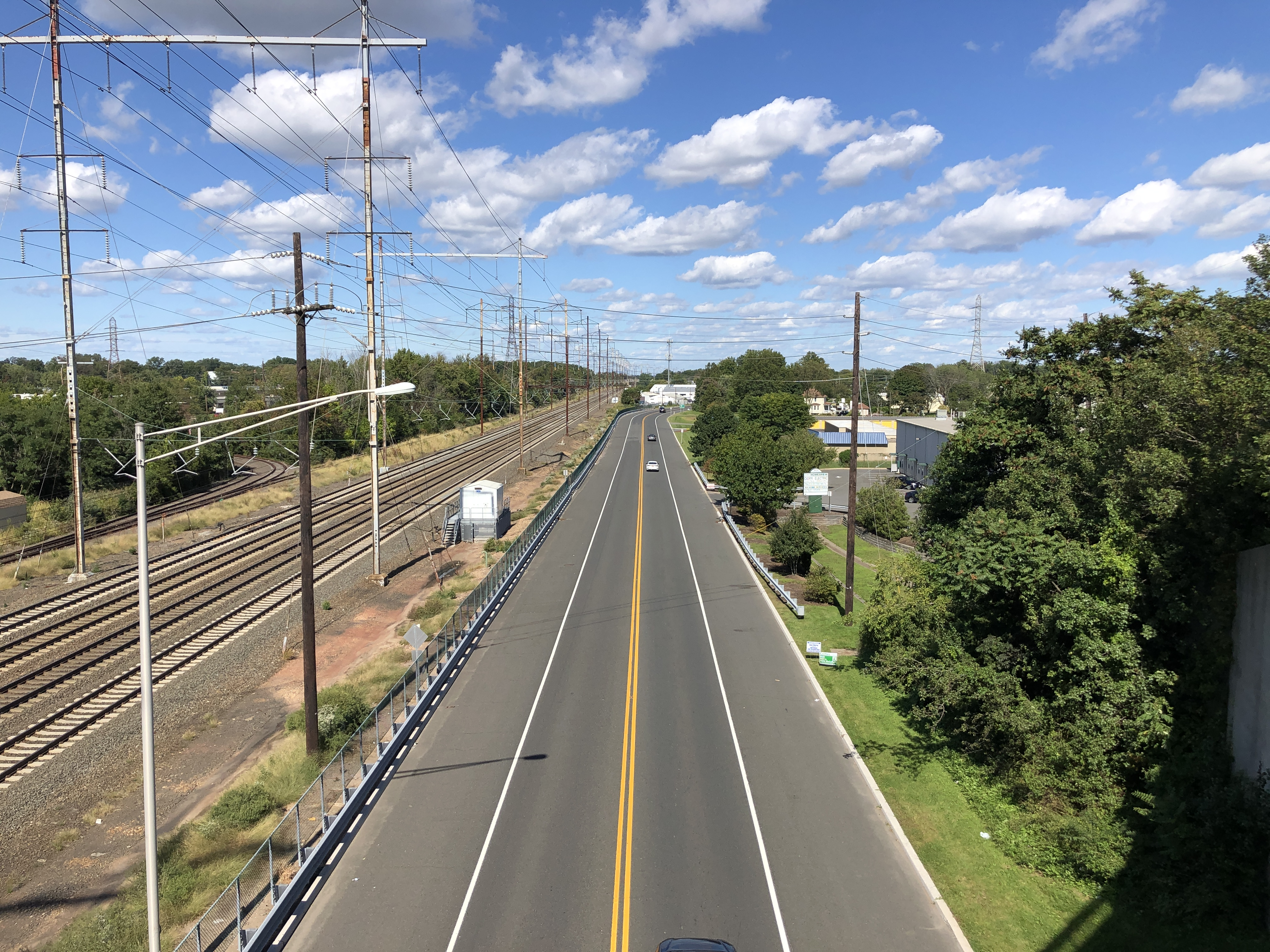
View northbound along Route 26 from US 1 in North Brunswick Township

Route 26 followed a majority of the Trenton and New Brunswick Turnpike, a gravel toll road envisioned in 1795 to connect Philadelphia, Pennsylvania with New York City. People raised money for the new turnpike, which was to cost $300,000 (1795 dollars) by selling 75,000 shares at $4 apiece. From there, officials would request charters from New Jersey, New York and Pennsylvania for creation of the highway. Although officials in cities like New Brunswick were supportive of the plan, insufficient funds were raised and the plans eventually folded. On November 14, 1804, the plans for a turnpike went forward once again, with the New Jersey State Legislature chartered the Trenton and New Brunswick Turnpike, a new toll road between the two cities. In Trenton, the turnpike was to begin at either Warren or Green Streets, heading along the current US 1 corridor to New Brunswick, where it would end. The new charter set a term of 99 years for the corporation. Two thousand shares of stock in the corporation were to be sold at $100 apiece (1804 dollars). Tolls for the highway would cost from half a cent to two cents a mile, as approved by the State Legislature.

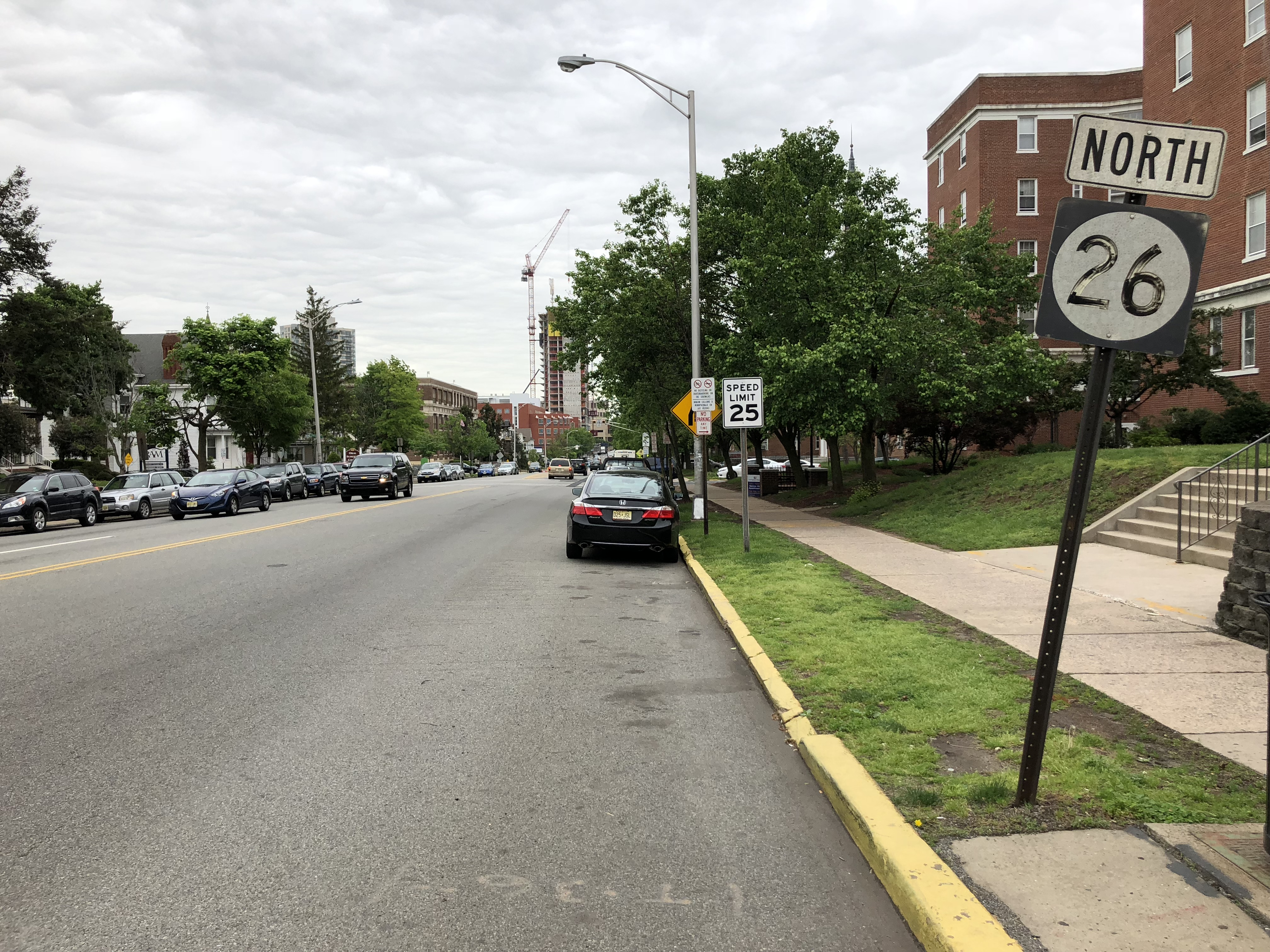
1965 shield of Route 26 on its newer alignments of CR 691 and Route 171

On August 9, 1805, the commissioners of the turnpike met in the community of Kingston to appoint officers and to begin to lay out the new highway. Enough of the 2,000 shares had been subscribed, and the commissioners went ahead and approved a survey map created for the turnpike. By 1806, a portion of the new turnpike was opened and tolls were being collected on the new highway. On November 28, 1806, a second charter was passed in the legislature to grant fines of $20 (1806 dollars) for evading tolls or defacing property along the turnpike. In 1807, the road was completed, and Henry Gallatin, the United States Secretary of the Treasury, reported that the alignment of the 25-mile (40 km) long turnpike was nearly straight except for an "obstruction" at Sand Hills, where they had to dig into the hill to create the highway. The new turnpike was 36 feet (11 m) wide and had stone abutments for the new wooden bridges.

The turnpike was heavily trafficked, with several forms of transportation using it at a time. There were three tollgates along the turnpike, one at around 4 miles (6.4 km) from Trenton, one at Ridge Road and one at the current railroad crossing for US 1. Toll collectors on the turnpike would often have a hard time counting the number of horses at a tollgate because of kicked up smoke and dust. During the War of 1812, the turnpike gained record usage, moving goods between Philadelphia and New York. A third supplement was added to the charter in January 1814, where the turnpike corporation would have to upgrade the road in eighteen months or face removal of tolls. If they did not, tollgates would be removed from the turnpike. Although the corporation upgraded the route in 1827, the road was still very tough to travel for passengers and people hauling expensive goods. During the early 19th century, the turnpike was profiting from stagecoach companies, which had about six different lines winding through the turnpike. When the Delaware and Raritan Canal and Camden and Amboy Railroad were constructed during the 19th century, the profits began to dwindle and the turnpike could not handle the expenses for stagecoaches.

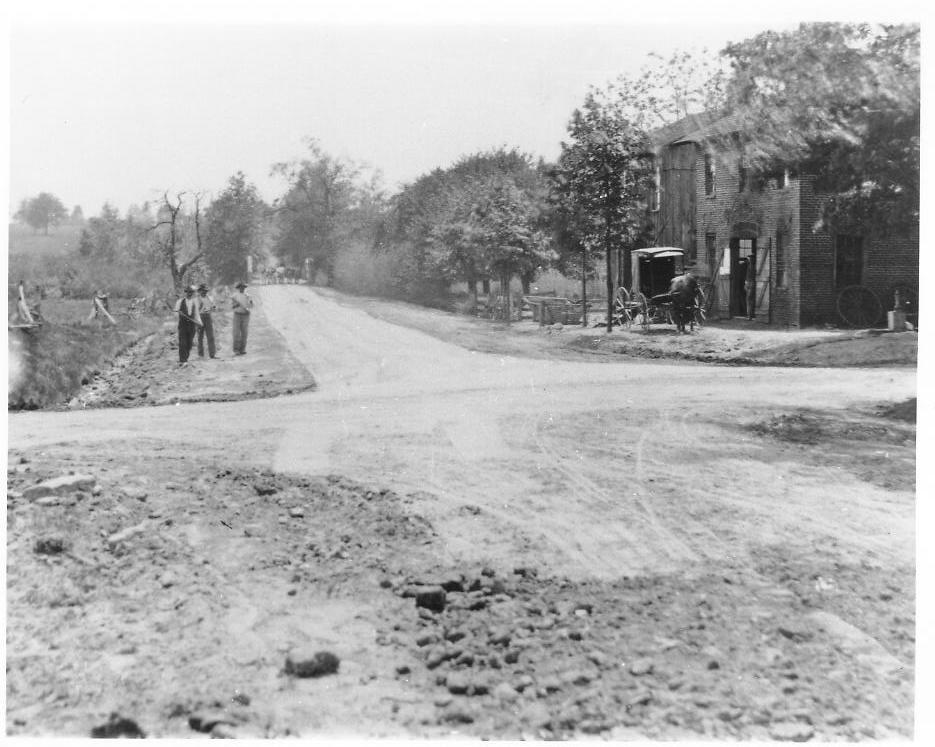
A view of the turnpike in 1904

To cause further problems, in 1832, the New Jersey State Legislature approved the Philadelphia and Trenton Railroad, a railroad to connect the two cities. A further note was made that the railroad could acquire the old turnpike for railroad right-of-way to connect Philadelphia and New York. That December, the railroad company attempted to merge the turnpike company into theirs, but faced opposition. In 1834, the turnpike company requested the choice to put another railroad on their turnpike right-of-way, but the monopoly from the Delaware and Raritan Canal and Camden and Amboy Railroad immediately opposed. Later that year, the Philadelphia and Trenton gained a controlling interest in the turnpike company, with hopes to lay the tracks on the right-of-way. The railroad company petitioned the state legislature to let them lay tracks, but the votes turned against their favor. After the Camden and Amboy commandeered control of the Philadelphia and Trenton Railroad, a secret truce was made in 1835, which left the construction of a railroad to become a dead proposal, and the right-of-way remained a road. However, the turnpike was already hurting for funds, as passenger and most stagecoach traffic had moved to the Camden and Amboy Railroad. The last stagecoach line left went out of business soon after becoming the only stagecoach line along the turnpike, which cut turnpike revenues drastically.

By 1858, the turnpike had basically begun to fold, with tolls only being charged at one gate for several years as most traffic had moved to rails rather than road. That year however, there were some upgrades made to the road, but not by much. In 1867, the competitor Camden and Amboy Railroad merged with the United New Jersey Railroad to create a new company. In December 1871, that company then became part of the Pennsylvania Railroad, which was one of the major railroads at that point. The railroad also took over jurisdiction of the turnpike. In 1899, people from Trenton and nearby Penns Neck approached the railroad to help reconstruct the old turnpike road, but no full proposal ever came forward. By 1903, the 1804 charter had expired, and the roadway was placed under public control, but was still in a derelict condition.

=== Route 26 is designated ===
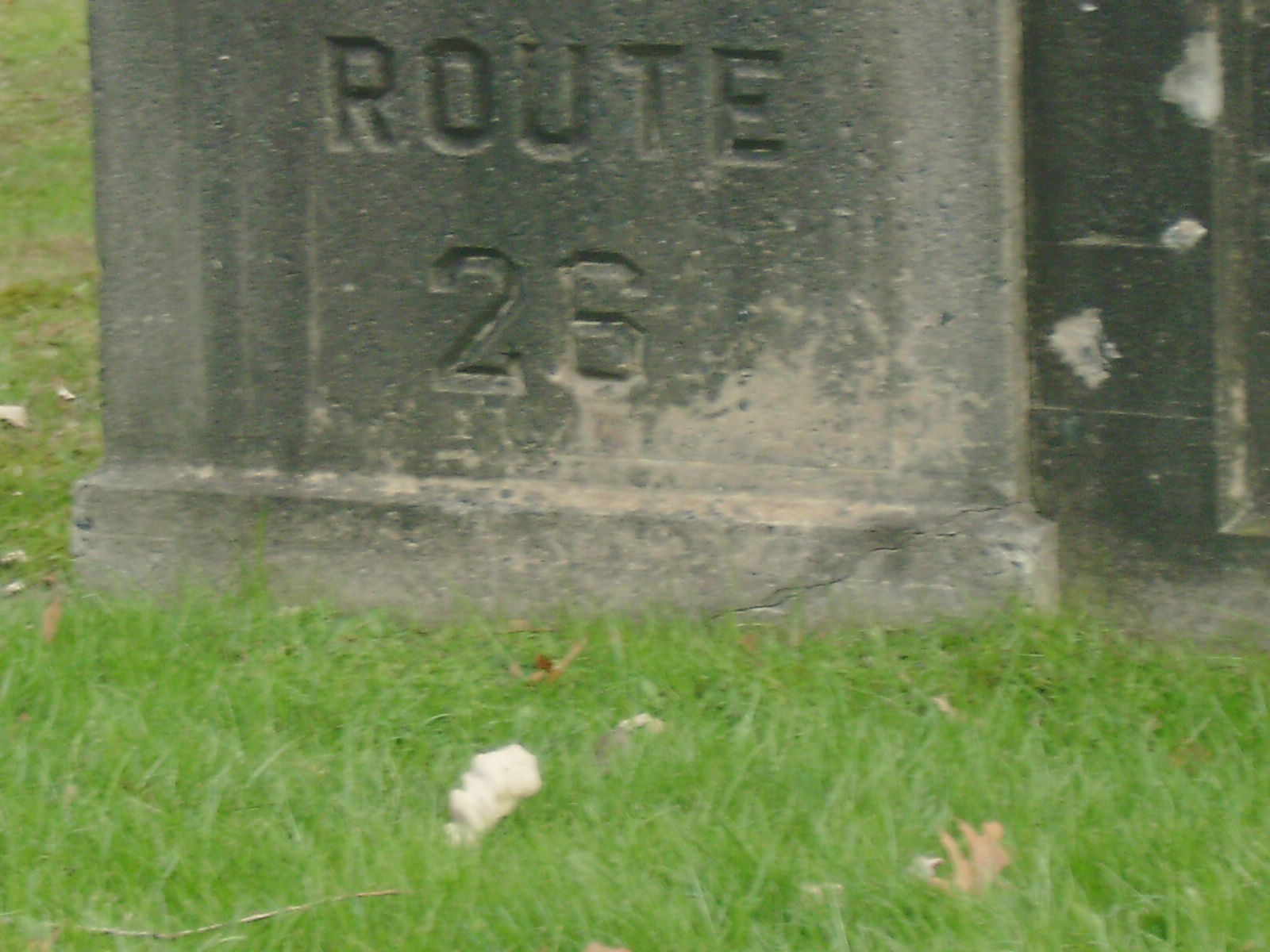
Route 26 stamp bridge in West Windsor

In 1927, about 24 years after the Trenton and New Brunswick Turnpike was revert to the state for future usage, the New Jersey State Highway Department designated the entire alignment from the Trenton-Morrisville Bridge in Trenton to the area around the Mile Run Brook in New Brunswick as a part of State Highway Route 26. The designation, assigned as part of the 1927 state highway renumbering covered the current alignments of most of U.S. Route 1 from Trenton (including its business loop) to where Route 26 turned onto Livingston Avenue. From there, Route 26 continued along Livingston Avenue past Nassau Street and into the city of New Brunswick, ending near an intersection with State Highway Route S-28 (George Street). Construction of the new highway continued northward, with a portion of the highway still unconstructed by June 1930, a 2-mile (3.2 km) portion near the Adams train station and part of Livingston Avenue still was not constructed to full state standards.

Route S26 (1927–1953)

Route 26 along with State Highway Route 25 soon became high-use routes to get drivers from Philadelphia to New York via New Brunswick as the large high-speed roadway. In the 1927 renumbering, a connection from Route 26 to Route 25 was also assigned, bypassing to the south of New Brunswick. This route was designated as State Highway Route S-26, a route completely concurrent with U.S. Route 1. In 1931, the State Highway Department contracted plans for a new bridge over the Delaware and Raritan Canal near Bakers Basin. Although Route 26 was considered the longest straight section of highway in the state, the new freeway would get rid of a dangerous S-curve along the highway. On January 30, 1932, the State Highway Department opened the newly constructed Calhoun Street Extension to traffic. This new freeway, designated as part of Route 26, was constructed as a bypass of the business districts in Trenton and Morrisville, Pennsylvania with a new traffic circle from the Route 26 mainline (now the Brunswick Circle). Calhoun Street was realigned in the process to help make traffic flow.

In October 1935, the State Highway Department started work on moving an 8-mile (13 km) stretch of Route 26 over 12 feet (3.7 m) from its current alignment. The project, considered unprecedented in history, was tested in September of that year near Penns Neck to certify the feasibility of such an accomplishment. Work started in October, costing the state $400,000 (1935 dollars), including money from the Public Works Administration. The stretch of highway from Ridge Road to Adams Station Road was to be moved over to reduce the number of accidents occurring along the former alignment. In 1934 alone, accidents along Route 26 caused 90 fatalities, with a similar figure occurring until that point in 1935. By November 1936, the project had completed 7 miles (11 km) of the proposed 8-mile (13 km) conversion, an engineering feat of the time. The men who were doing this were considered "experts" in the jobs. By February 1939, the project had ballooned in price, reaching $842,000 (1939 dollars) and the project was still incomplete. The missing work included a new island for a median.

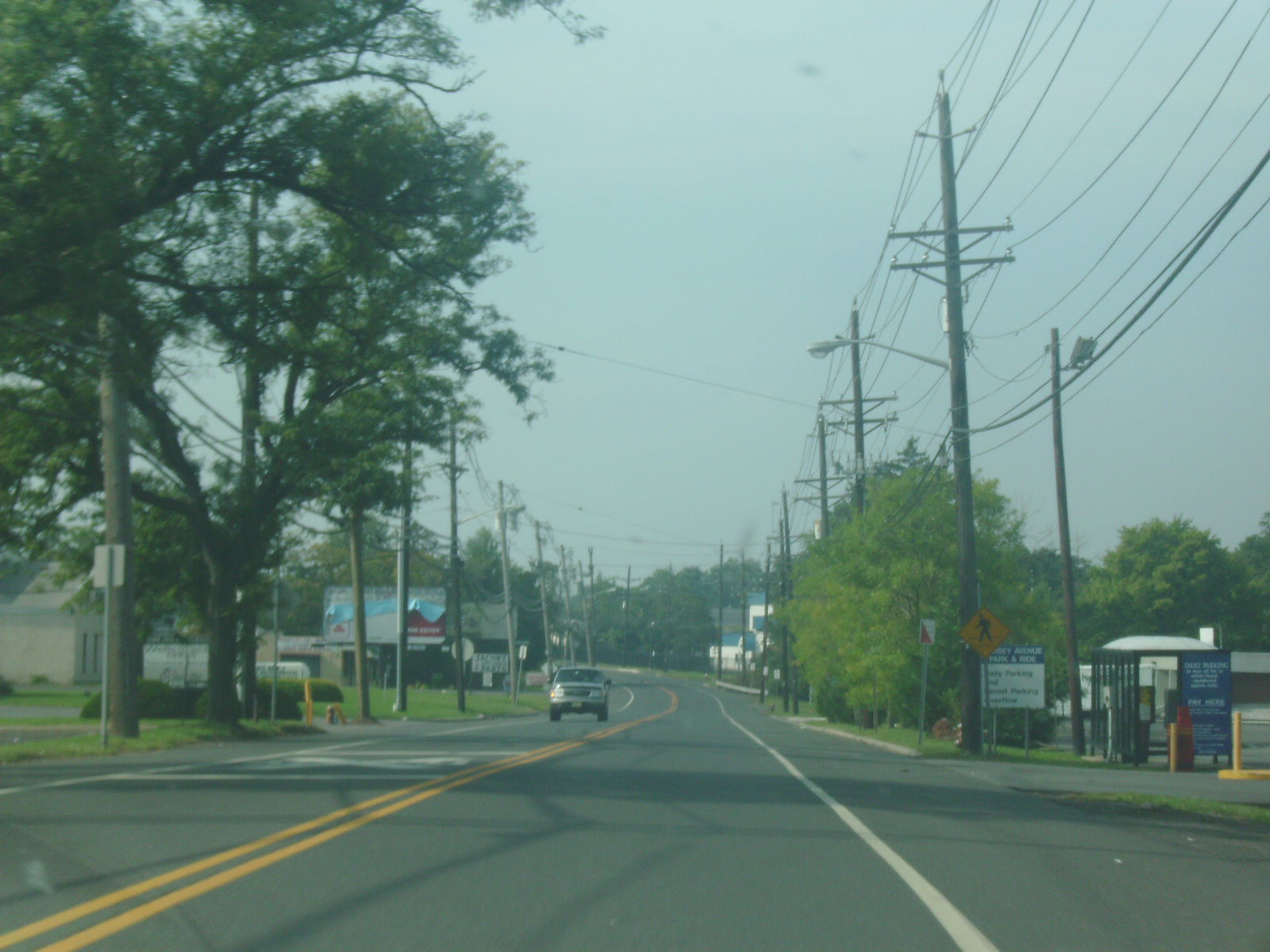
Route 91 through New Brunswick, the former alignment of Route 26-A and the Trenton and New Brunswick Turnpike

During the 1930s, the outcry for lighting along State Highway Routes 26 and 25 began to rise with the number of traffic accidents. Approximately 7.70% of traffic were in accidents along Route 26 at nighttime contrary to 2.42% during the daytime. Although lighting was still in testing by 1938 (with State Highway Route 24 as a test highway), Route 26 still had a high night accident rate, urging further actions for lighting the new roadway. During the 1940s, the Middlesex County officials designated Route 26 (Livingston Avenue) through New Brunswick as County Highway 3-R-16, but was signed as part of Route 26 to its end at State Highway Route S-28 (George Street). In 1941, the State Highway Department designated a spur along Jersey Avenue in North Brunswick and New Brunswick, which was taken over as State Highway Route 26-A, that provided direct access to State Highway Route 27 in New Brunswick. In 1947, the New Jersey State Highway Department expanded a 10-mile (16 km) stretch of three-lane roadway to four lanes for $500,000. This addition of new lanes was started to help safety of drivers down Route 26.

=== Trenton Freeway and truncation ===
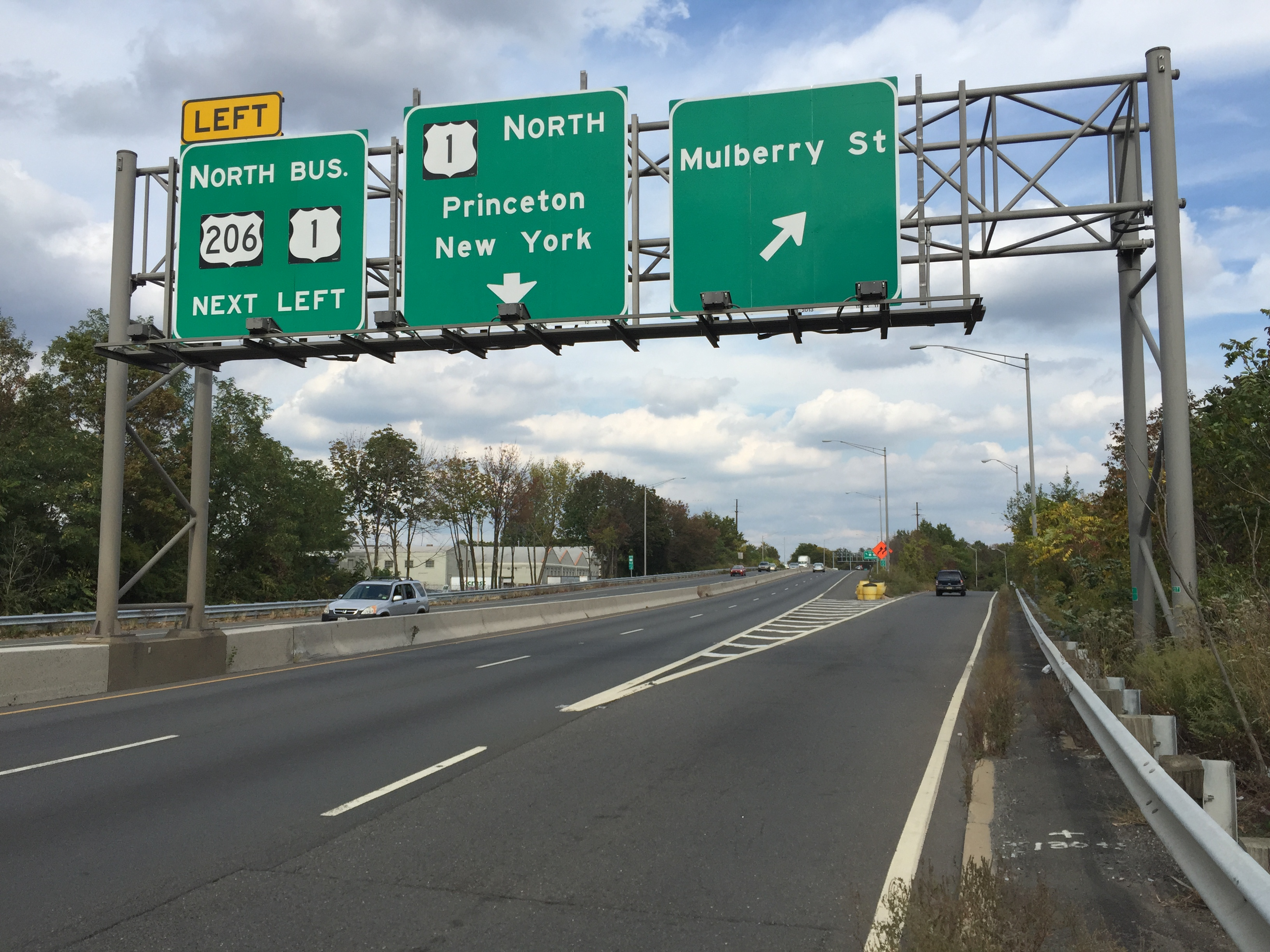
Route 1 in the city of Trenton, along the Trenton Freeway

During the 1950s, plans arose in Trenton to construct a new bypass of the city to the west. The bypass, to be a four-lane freeway, was designated as another portion of Route 26 when the highway was constructed in 1952. The new route also included the construction of the Trenton-Morrisville Toll Bridge, a $6.25 million (1952 dollars) span across the Delaware River. Just 30 days after the new Trenton Freeway was opened to automobile traffic, the highways were renumbered around the state. Route 26 was truncated back from the state line in Trenton to an interchange with U.S. Route 1 in North Brunswick Township, while its alignment became State Route 174 (a portion of the Trenton Freeway), U.S. Route 1 and U.S. Route 1 Alternate. The two suffixed spurs of Route 26 were also truncated, with State Highway Route 26-A becoming Route 91, and State Highway Route S-26 becoming only a portion of U.S. Route 1. The route, however, continued into downtown New Brunswick, where it terminated at Route 18. By the 1980s, Route 26 had been truncated back to Nassau Street. The county-maintained portion became Middlesex County Route 691 while the northernmost portion of Livingston Avenue became part of Route 171.

== Major intersections ==
The entire route is in Middlesex County.

| Location | mi | km | Destinations | Notes |
|---|---|---|---|---|
| North Brunswick Township | 0.00 | 0.00 | US 1 north – Newark | Interchange, southern terminus of Route 26 |
| North Brunswick Township | 0.87 | 1.40 | US 1 south / Route 26 Connector – Trenton | Interchange |
| New Brunswick | 2.54 | 4.09 | CR 691 north (North Livingston Avenue) / Nassau Street | |
1.000 mi = 1.609 km; 1.000 km = 0.621 mi
