= U.S. Route 1 Business (Trenton, New Jersey) =

Highway in Trenton, New Jersey

U.S. Route 1 Business
- US 1 Bus. in its present routing in red and unofficial, yet signed, routing in pink

Route information
- Auxiliary route of US 1
- Maintained by NJDOT
- Length: 2.73 mi (4.39 km)

Major junctions
- South end: US 1 / US 206 in Trenton
- North end: US 1 in Lawrence Township

Location
- Country: United States
- State: New Jersey
- Counties: Mercer

Highway system
- United States Numbered Highway System; List; Special; Divided; New Jersey State Highway Routes; Interstate; US; State; Scenic Byways

U.S. Route 1 Business (US 1 Bus.) is a four-lane surface road that provides an alternate route to the Trenton Freeway (US 1) northeast of Trenton in Mercer County, New Jersey. The route is 2.73 miles (4.39 km) long and runs between US 1 in Trenton and Lawrence Township. On the border of Trenton and Lawrence Township, US 1 Bus. intersects the northbound direction of US 206 at the Brunswick Circle. The route was once part of a longer U.S. Route 1 Alternate (US 1 Alt.), which continued southwest through downtown Trenton and into Morrisville, Pennsylvania.

The old US 1 Alt. in Trenton is now signed by the New Jersey Department of Transportation as part of US 1 Bus., despite not being officially recognized as such. Signage in Pennsylvania no longer exists; most of the former US 1 Alt. is now part of Pennsylvania Route 32 (PA 32). US 1 Alt. was created in 1953 after US 1 was moved to a freeway between Morrisville and the Brunswick Circle. By the 1980s, when the Trenton Freeway was extended to its current terminus, US 1 Bus. was created onto its current alignment and US 1 Alt. was removed through Trenton and Morrisville.

== Route description ==
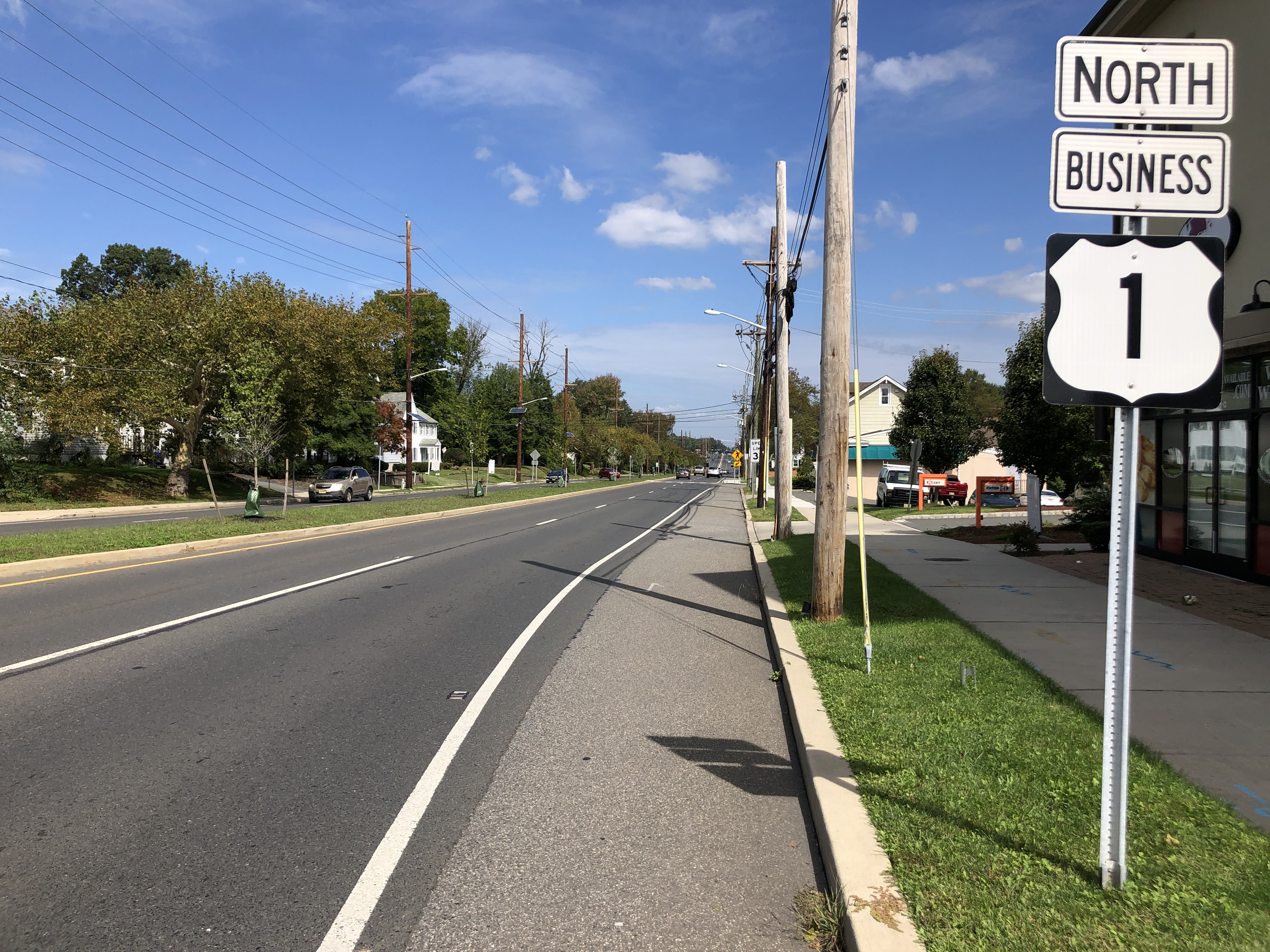
US 1 Bus. northbound at CR 616 in Lawrence Township

US 1 Bus. begins at a split from the median of the US 1 freeway in Trenton, having access to and from the south along US 1. The road heads north as a four-lane divided highway before making a turn to the northwest. The route becomes four-lane undivided Strawberry Street and passes through residential areas. At the border of Lawrence Township and Trenton, the road enters the Brunswick Circle, where it junctions with northbound US 206 and CR 645. At the circle, the route turns northeast onto a four-lane divided highway known locally as the Brunswick Pike (originally the Trenton and New Brunswick Turnpike) and enters Lawrence Township. The road runs through residential and commercial areas and passes Colonial Lake, with a few intersections controlled by jughandles. US 1 Bus. has an intersection with CR 616, which heads east to provide access to US 1. Further to the northeast, the settings become more commercial before US 1 Bus. merges into northbound US 1 at the northeast end of the Trenton Freeway.

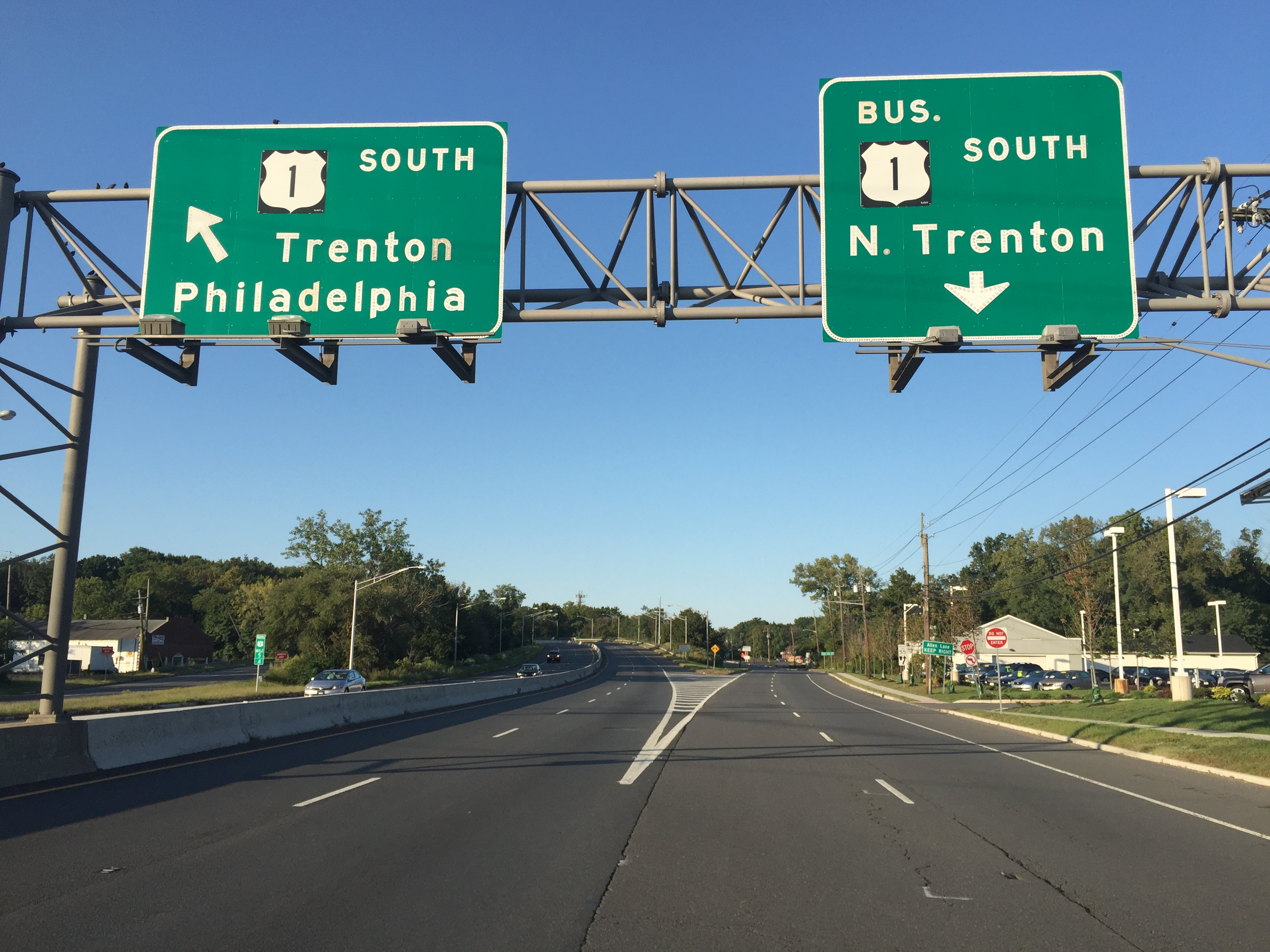
View south at the north end of US 1 Bus. at US 1 in Lawrence Township

Despite the official route beginning at US 1 near the Brunswick Circle, signage has US 1 Bus. begin at the Lower Trenton Bridge over the Delaware River, just north of the Trenton–Morrisville Toll Bridge (US 1). The continuation into Pennsylvania is State Route 2060 (SR 2060), an unsigned quadrant route, to the PA 32 intersection in Morrisville. From the bridge, US 1 Bus. signage heads northeast on Bridge Street, with the road curving north onto Warren Street into downtown Trenton. At Livingston Street, the road becomes a one-way pair following Warren Street southbound and Broad Street northbound, concurrent with US 206. At the south end of Route 31, the one-way pair becomes Brunswick Avenue northbound and Martin Luther King Jr. Boulevard southbound, heading northeast. These two roads are two-way but carry only one direction of US 1 Bus./US 206. The one-way pair continues to the Brunswick Circle, where the official US 1 Bus. continues north. Strawberry Street is signed "to US 1 south" from the circle and as US 1 Bus. north from US 1. Southbound US 1 Bus. leaves the circle with US 206 southbound on the Brunswick Circle Extension, merging with Princeton Avenue (CR 583). Officially, the Brunswick Circle Extension is CR 645 and US 206 southbound bypasses the circle via Princeton Avenue, but all signage points US 206 through the circle. Northbound US 1 Bus. and US 206 simply enter the circle from Brunswick Avenue.

== History ==
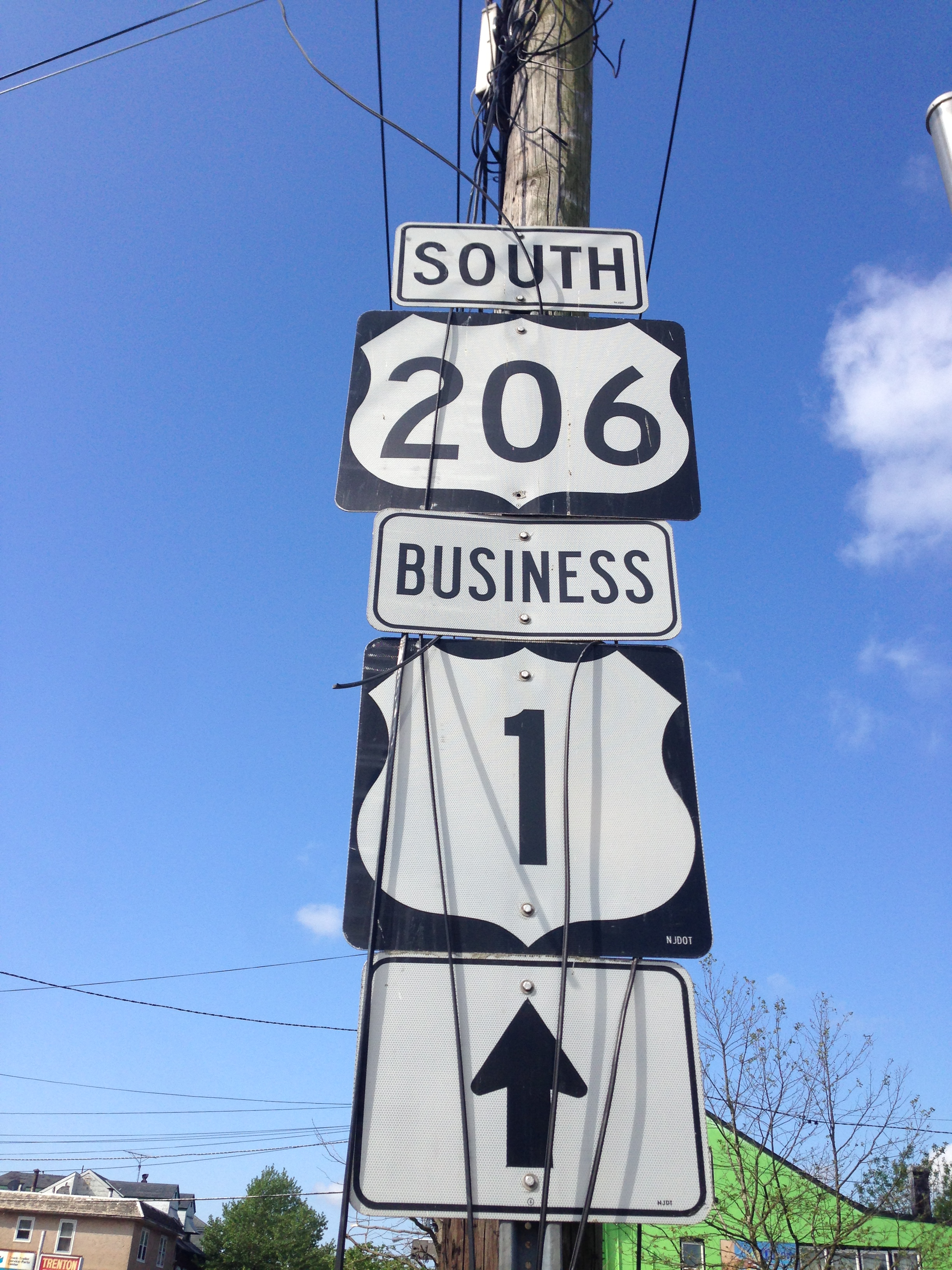
Signage for US 206 and US 1 Bus. along Martin Luther King Jr. Boulevard in Trenton. While signed as such, this section is not officially part of US 1 Bus.

What is now US 1 Bus. north of the Brunswick Circle was chartered as part of the Trenton and New Brunswick Turnpike in 1803. This turnpike became a public road in 1903. In 1926, the U.S. Numbered Highway System was created and US 1 was designated to run through the Trenton area from the Lower Trenton Bridge north to Route 13, which it followed to New Brunswick. In the 1927 New Jersey state highway renumbering, Route 13 became Route 27 and the Trenton and New Brunswick Turnpike, which ran parallel to Route 13 in Trenton, became Route 26. By the 1930s, US 1 was rerouted to follow Route 26 between Trenton and New Brunswick, with US 206 being designated along Route 27 in Trenton.

In December 1952, the Trenton–Morrisville Toll Bridge and its approaches opened, which included the Trenton Freeway between the Delaware River and the Brunswick Circle. US 1 was rerouted onto the new bridge and the Trenton Freeway. In the 1953 New Jersey state highway renumbering that occurred a month later, the Route 26 and Route 27 designations were removed through Trenton. In addition, US 1 Alt. was designated onto the former US 1 in Morrisville and Trenton, running from US 1 on the western end of Morrisville and over the Lower Trenton Bridge into Trenton, where it continued northeast to US 1 at the Brunswick Circle. By the 1980s, an extension of the Trenton Freeway had been completed to Lawrence Township. US 1 was rerouted to this freeway and US 1 Bus. was designated onto the former US 1 between the freeway's north end and the interchange at Strawberry Street. The US 1 Alt. designation through Trenton and Morrisville was officially removed. Most of the route in Trenton is now only officially a part of US 206, despite being signed as US 1 Bus. The former US 1 Alt. in Morrisville became SR 2060 from the Lower Trenton Bridge to PA 32 and a southern extension of PA 32 south of there.

== Major intersections ==
The entire route is in Mercer County.

Location	mi	km	Destinations	Notes
Trenton	0.00	0.00	US 1 south	Southern terminus
Lawrence Township	0.42	0.68	US 206 north (Brunswick Avenue) – Trenton, Lawrenceville, Princeton	Brunswick Circle
Lawrence Township	2.73	4.39	US 1 north	Northern terminus
1.000 mi = 1.609 km; 1.000 km = 0.621 mi
