= New Jersey Route 91 =

State highway in New Jersey, US

Route 91
- Jersey Avenue

Route information
- Maintained by NJDOT
- Length: 2.26 mi (3.64 km)
- Existed: January 1, 1953–present

Major junctions
- South end: US 1 in North Brunswick Township
- North end: CR 693 in New Brunswick

Location
- Country: United States
- State: New Jersey
- Counties: Middlesex

Highway system
- New Jersey State Highway Routes; Interstate; US; State; Scenic Byways
← Route 90	→ Route 92

Route 91 is a 2.26-mile-long (3.64 km) spur state highway in Middlesex County, New Jersey. The route runs as a spur of U.S. Route 1 (US 1) along Jersey Avenue in North Brunswick Township to Van Dyke Avenue in the city of New Brunswick. At Van Dyke Avenue, Route 91 ends as a state route, and Jersey Avenue continues as County Route 693 (CR 693) to Route 27 in the center of New Brunswick. The mainline of Route 91 officially ends at the ramps to and from US 1 southbound (bound for Trenton) and Orchard Street; the 0.37-mile-long (0.60 km) connector constructed from US 1 northbound is designated as Route 91 Connector.

The route originates as the Route 26 Connecting Link, an extension of Jersey Avenue. This alignment was designated as Route 26A, a spur of State Highway Route 26 in 1941, and renumbered in the 1953 state highway renumbering as Route 91. The route has remained virtually untouched since.

== Route description ==
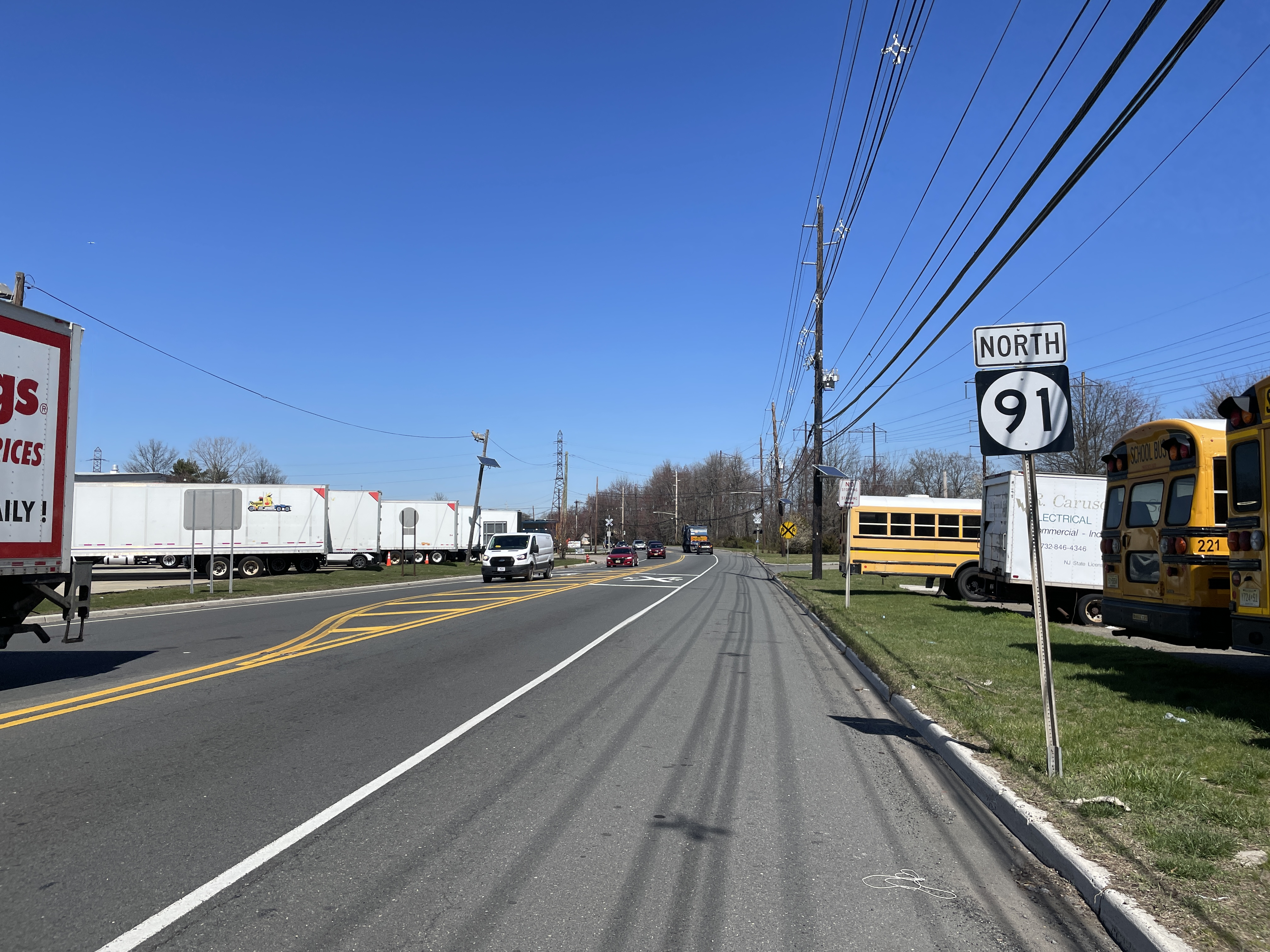
View north near the south end of Route 91 just north of US 1 in North Brunswick

Route 91 begins at an interchange with US 1 in the North Brunswick Township, New Jersey community of Adams. The route heads northward as Jersey Avenue, passing several fields and ponds, running parallel to US 1. A short distance later, Route 91 enters the industrial district of North Brunswick, where it reaches an intersection with Route 91 Connector, a spur from US 1 northbound to the Route 91 mainline. Paralleling Amtrak's Northeast Corridor tracks to the west, Jersey Avenue passes through a small corporate park in North Brunswick. A short distance later, Route 91 intersects with CR 680 (How Lane), which connects Route 91 with nearby Route 27 and Route 26. Upon crossing How Lane, Route 91 crosses the township line and enters the city of New Brunswick.

Route 91 continues northward along Jersey Avenue, passing through the industrial districts in the southeastern portion of the city. With the Northeast Corridor tracks nearby, Route 91 intersects with Triangle Road, where it meets a park & ride and the service road to the Jersey Avenue station serving NJ Transit's Northeast Corridor Line. There, the highway also crosses a railroad spur from the train line. The highway continues, passing some commercial buildings, before the Route 91 designation terminates at an intersection with Van Dyke Avenue. Jersey Avenue continues into New Brunswick's center as Middlesex County Route 693.

== History ==
Route 26A
- Location: North Brunswick–New Brunswick
- Existed: 1941–1953

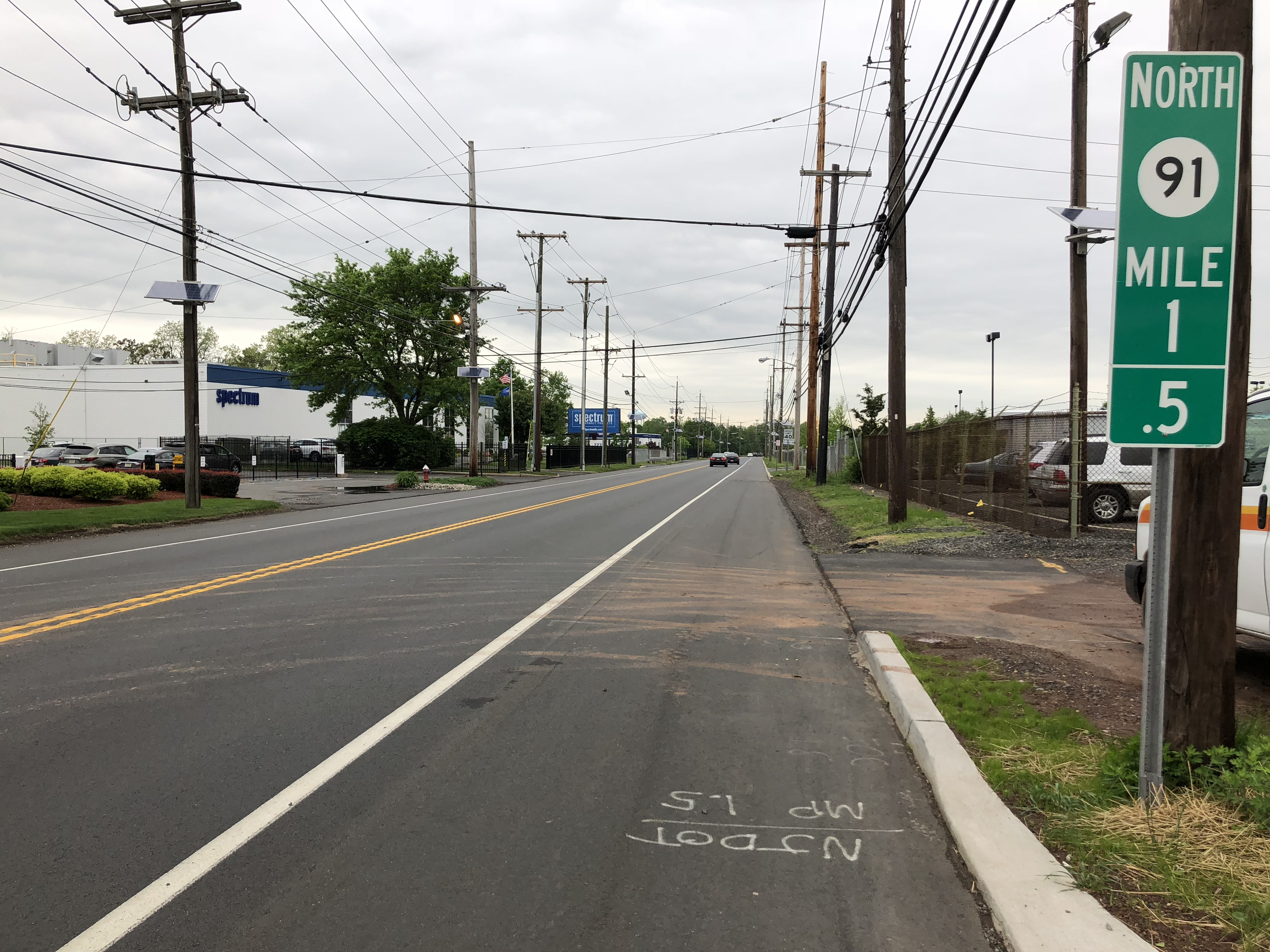
Route 91 northbound at milepost 1.5 in New Brunswick

Route 91 was originally constructed in 1929 as the Route 26 Connecting Link, extending Jersey Avenue south from Van Dyke Avenue to the old Trenton and New Brunswick Turnpike in North Brunswick, where it followed this highway for a short distance to the end of a new bridge carrying Route 26 over the Pennsylvania Railroad. This route allowed a bypass of New Brunswick's downtown to reach the Albany Street Bridge. In 1941, this highway was designated by the legislature as State Highway Route 26A. The existing Jersey Avenue beyond Van Dyke Avenue was taken over by Middlesex County as County Route 3R20, later renumbered County Route 693.

During the second state highway renumbering in January 1953, the designation of Route 26 was truncated from Trenton to U.S. Route 1 in North Brunswick Township. With Route 26A no longer terminating at its parent highway, the suffixed spur was renumbered to Route 91, heading from U.S. Route 1 in Adams to Van Dyke Road. The route has changed little since designation.

== Major intersections ==
The entire route is in Middlesex County.

Location	mi	km	Destinations	Notes
North Brunswick Township	0.00	0.00	US 1 south / Orchard Street – Trenton	Interchange
North Brunswick Township	0.28	0.45	US 1 north / Route 91 Connector – Newark	Unsigned Route 91 Connector
New Brunswick	2.26	3.64	CR 693 north (Jersey Avenue) / Van Dyke Avenue	
1.000 mi = 1.609 km; 1.000 km = 0.621 mi
