= Forrestal Village =

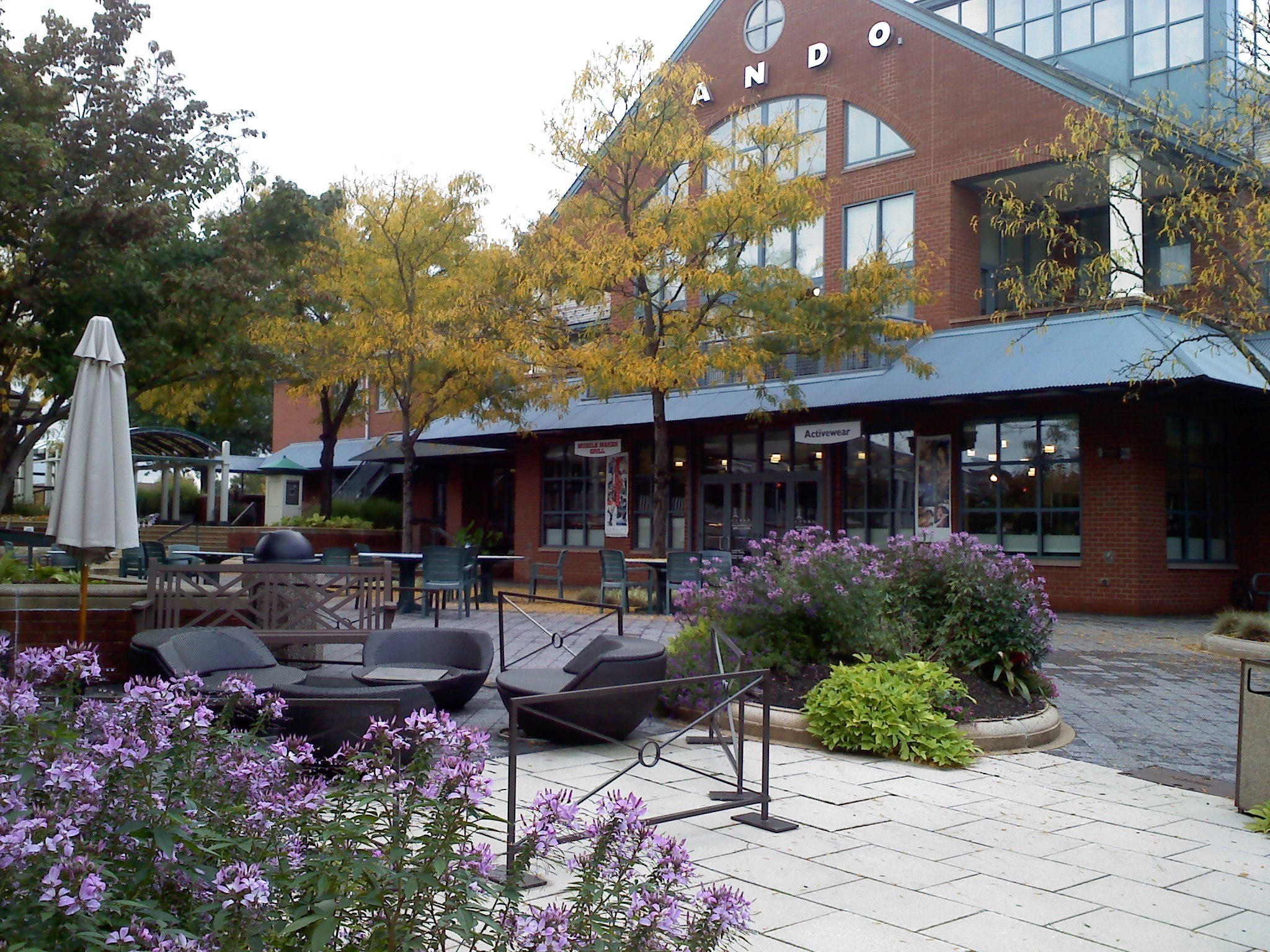
- Location: Princeton, New Jersey, United States
- Coordinates: 40.35609°N 74.61193°W
- Address: 300 Forrestal Rd
- Opened: 1986
- Developer: Toombs Development Company
- Manager: Gale Real Estate Services Company
- Num. of stores: 30 (room for 41)
- Floor area: 720,000 sq ft (67,000 m^{2})
- Floors: 2
- Parking: Parking lot and parking garage
- Public transit: NJ Transit bus: 600
- Website: pfvillage.com

Forrestal Village is a 720,000-square-foot (67,000 m^{2}), 52-acre (210,000 m^{2}) mixed-use retail and office complex in Plainsboro Township, Middlesex County, New Jersey, along U.S. Route 1. Despite being in Plainsboro it has a Princeton address. It is just north of Princeton University's Forrestal campus and is named for James Forrestal. The center is anchored by Can Do Fitness (a chain of fitness centers in the northeast) and a Westin hotel. In recent years, it has suffered a sharp decline, turning into a dead mall. Renovations and rebranding as an office complex are underway to draw customers. The center has spawned some development in the area, including an adjacent office complex and several apartment and condo communities, including Princeton Windrows, which is right across the street.

Princeton Forrestal Village is designated for Office, Medical, Research, Education, Dwellings, Industrial and Commercial development.

== History ==
Princeton Forrestal Village broke ground in 1986 on land leased from Princeton University, at U.S. Route 1 and College Farm Road. A cloverleaf interchange was completed at the intersection to ease the congestion of the then-planned center. The center's developer ultimately paid for the intersection after a two-year battle against the Robert Wood Johnson Foundation.

Designed by Sasaki Associates of Watertown, Massachusetts, and Bower Lewis Thrower/Architects of Philadelphia, the initial goal of the center was to "Create a retail mix that will not just bring people in every few weeks like the regional malls do".

When it opened, it contained nightclubs, several restaurants, a 300-room Marriott hotel, an indoor food court, and many upscale stores, all set up in an open-air Main Street-style village area. To lure "everyday" shoppers, a barbershop, a tailor and custom shirt shop, a shoe repair establishment, an express mail operation and a video rental store were also opened.

Since the area was surrounded by competitors, such as downtown Princeton, Palmer Square, and the Quaker Bridge Mall, it was not as successful as planned. As many of the upscale tenants moved out, the owners brought in outlet stores and the Forrestal Village became an outlet mall. The concept was successful for a brief period.

== Revitalization ==
By the late 1990s, the center was almost dead. Some changes were made, including the opening of the Tre Piani restaurant and a new office building on the site.

In 2003, the owners, The Praedium Group, sold the center for $39.6 million to the Gale Company. In 2007, the mall rebranded itself as mainly an office and professional complex with some retail stores, mainly for the office workers. By that time, the Marriott, which moved across Route 1 to the site of the former Scanticon Hotel, was replaced with a Westin. The first change was the Can Do Fitness, which opened up in the 60,000-square-foot (5,600 m^{2}) "Market Hall" building, which includes a Koi Spa, physical therapy center, nail salon, and other small retail stores inside. Also, Luxe Home, a furnishings store, relocated to the center from Princeton's Palmer Square.

Several restaurants, such as the Salt Creek Grille and Ruth's Chris Steak House have also opened. The food court, which was relocated from the Market Hall to an area in the main retail area, only has four current tenants, a Subway, a pizza place (Valentino's Pizzeria/Trattoria), a sushi/teriyaki vendor (Teriyaki Boy), and a Chinese restaurant/Deli (China Chen/Village Grille). Most of the other tenants in the retail spaces are offices and services.

== Gallery ==
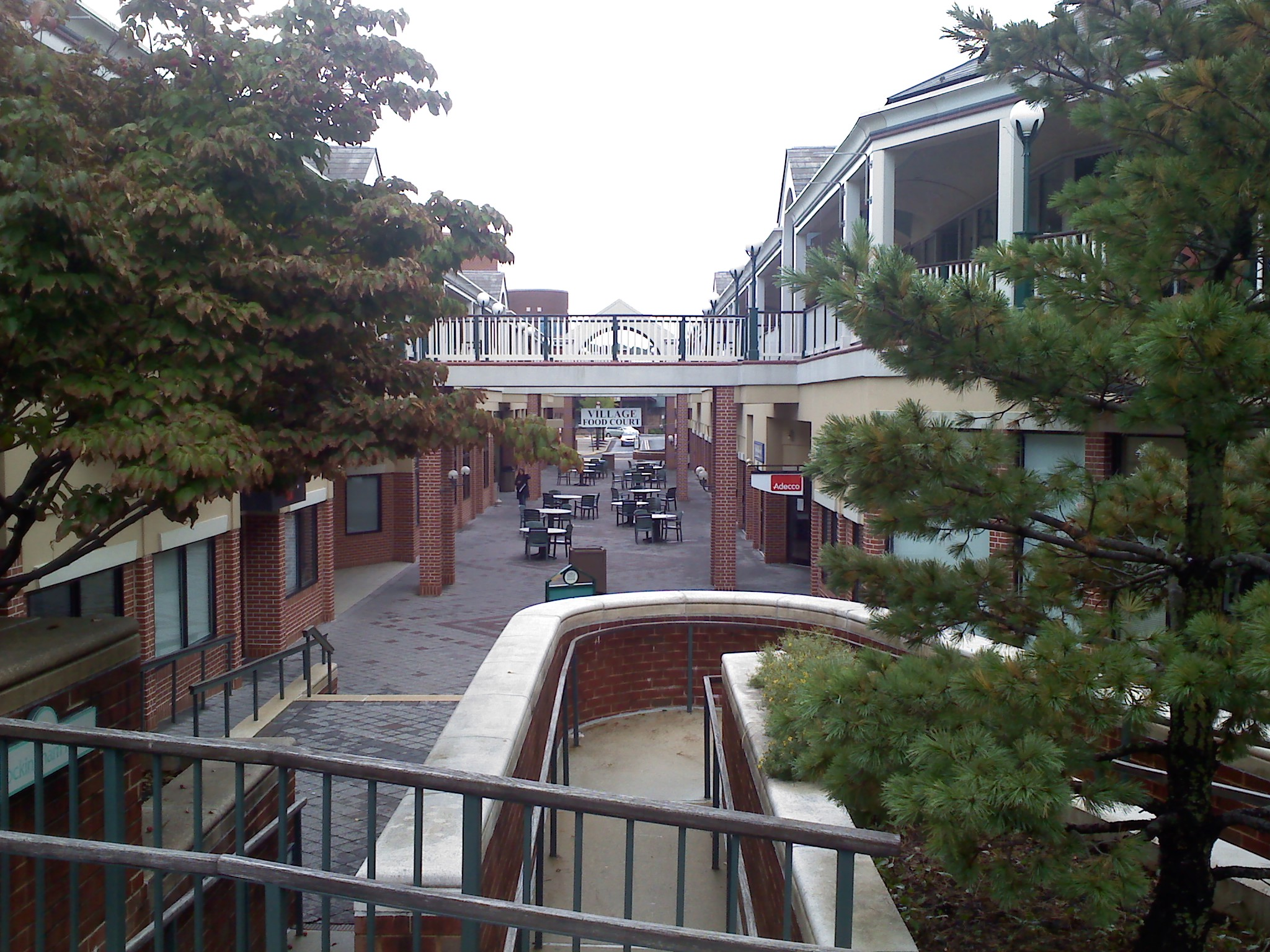
The Rockingham Row section of Forrestal Village

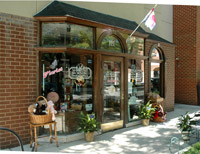
Morning Flowers

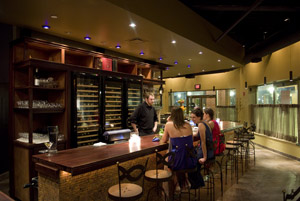
Inside Tre Piani

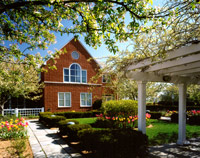
In the Spring

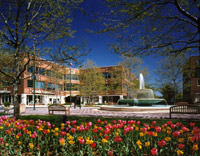
Fountain on the Square

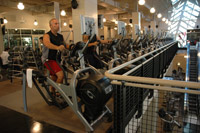
Cando Fitness

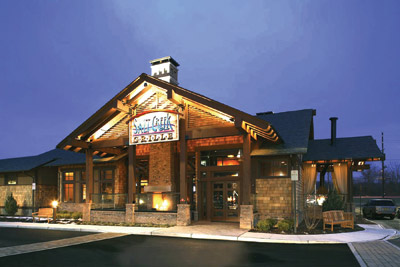
Salt Creek Grille

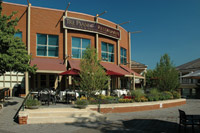
Tre Piani

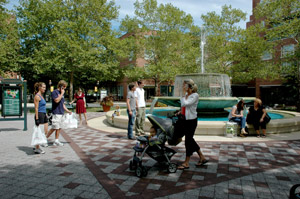
Fountain in the Square
