= U.S. Route 1 in New Jersey =

Highway in New Jersey

U.S. Route 1
- US 1 highlighted in red

Route information
- Maintained by NJDOT, DRJTBC, and PANYNJ
- Length: 66.06 mi (106.31 km)
- Existed: 1926–present
- Restrictions: No trucks on the Pulaski Skyway

Major junctions
- South end: US 1 at the Pennsylvania state line in Trenton
- Route 29 in Trenton; I-295 in Lawrence Township; US 130 / Route 171 in North Brunswick; I-287 / CR 531 in Edison; G.S. Parkway in Woodbridge Township; US 9 in Woodbridge Township; I-278 in Linden; I-78 / US 22 / Route 21 in Newark; US 46 in Palisades Park; I-95 / N.J. Turnpike / US 9W / Route 4 in Fort Lee
- North end: I-95 / US 1-9 at the New York state line in Fort Lee

Location
- Country: United States
- State: New Jersey
- Counties: Mercer, Middlesex, Union, Essex, Hudson, Bergen

Highway system
- United States Numbered Highway System; List; Special; Divided; New Jersey State Highway Routes; Interstate; US; State; Scenic Byways
← I-895	→ Route 1
← Route 173	Route 174	→ Route 175

U.S. Route 1 (US 1) is a U.S. Route which parallels the East Coast of the United States, running from Key West, Florida, in the south to Fort Kent, Maine, at the Canadian border in the north. Of the entire length of the route, 66.06 miles (106.31 km) of it runs through New Jersey. It enters the state from Pennsylvania on the Trenton–Morrisville Toll Bridge over the Delaware River in the state capital of Trenton, running through the city on the Trenton Freeway. From here, US 1 continues northeast as a surface divided highway through suburban areas, heading into Middlesex County and passing through New Brunswick and Edison. US 1 merges with US 9 in Woodbridge, and the two routes continue through northern New Jersey as US 1/9 to the George Washington Bridge over the Hudson River in Fort Lee. At this point, the road continues into New York City along with Interstate 95.

The current alignment of US 1 between Trenton and New Brunswick was chartered as the Trenton and New Brunswick Turnpike in 1803 and struggled throughout its 100-year existence. In 1913, the Lincoln Highway across the U.S. was created and connected Trenton to Newark within New Jersey. The Lincoln Highway was legislated as Route 13 between Trenton and New Brunswick in 1917 and as part of Route 1 between New Brunswick and Elizabeth, later extended to Jersey City. With the creation of the U.S. Highway System in 1926, US 1 was designated to follow the Lincoln Highway between Trenton and Newark and the current alignment of US 1/9 Truck to Jersey City, where it continued to the Holland Tunnel. In 1927, the Lincoln Highway portion of US 1 became Route 27. The current alignment of US 1 between Trenton and Newark was legislated as Route 26, Route S26, and Route 25, while the current route north from Jersey City to the George Washington Bridge became Route 1 and Route 6. In subsequent years, US 1 was moved onto its current routing between Trenton and the George Washington Bridge. The state highways running concurrent with US 1 were removed in 1953, around the same time the route was moved to the Trenton Freeway within Trenton and the old alignment became US 1 Alternate (US 1 Alt.), part of which is now US 1 Business (US 1 Bus.). By 1969, the Trenton Freeway was extended north to Whitehead Road in Lawrence Township, and that segment became Route 174. When the Trenton Freeway was completed north to US 1, the US 1 designation was shifted to the freeway, replacing Route 174.

== Route description ==
=== Mercer County ===
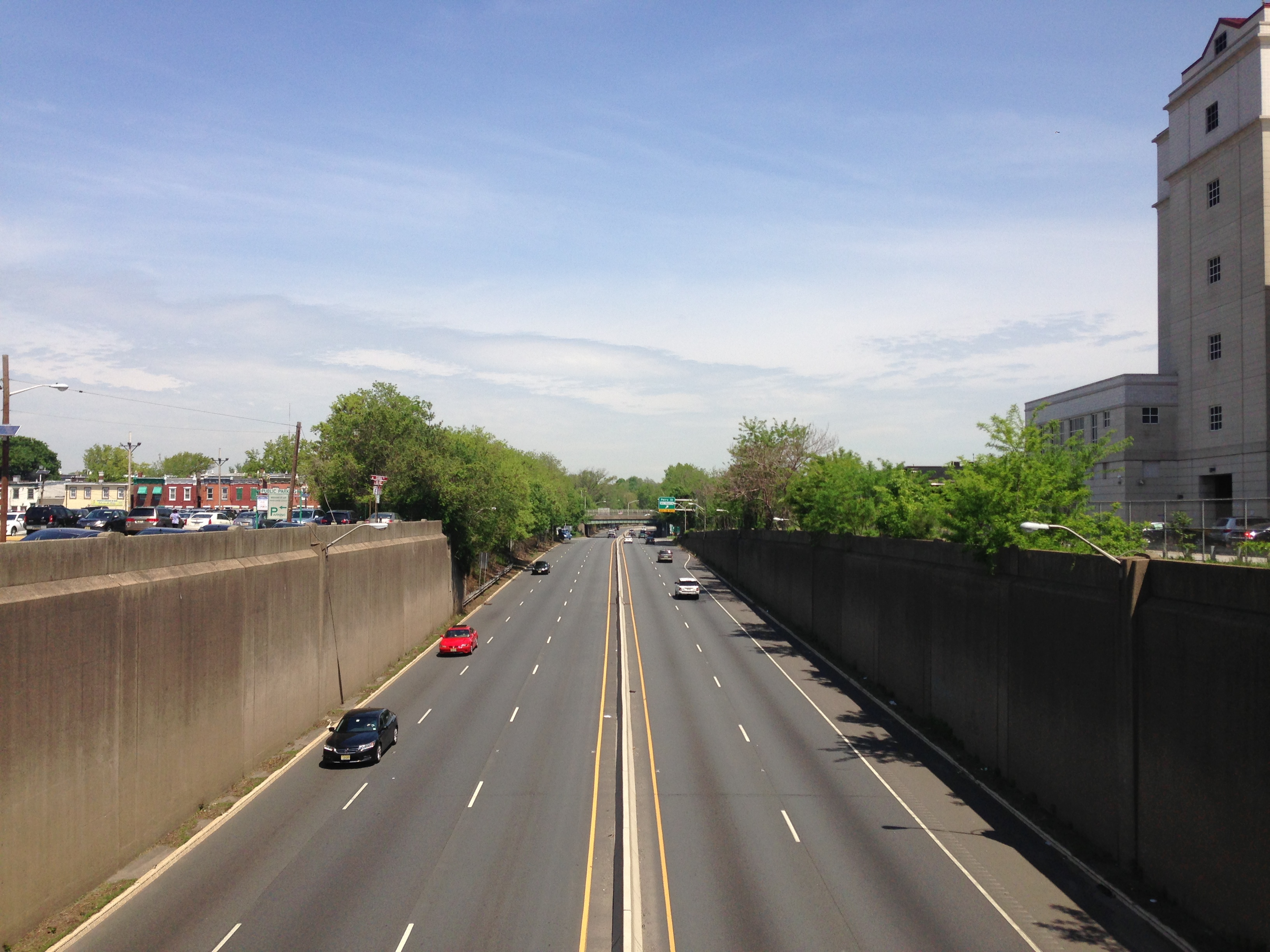
US 1 through downtown Trenton, looking north from the East State Street overpass

US 1 crosses the Delaware River from Pennsylvania into New Jersey on the Trenton–Morrisville Toll Bridge, which is maintained by the Delaware River Joint Toll Bridge Commission. Once in Trenton, US 1 becomes the Trenton Freeway and is maintained by the New Jersey Department of Transportation (NJDOT). US 1 meets Route 29 at a partial diamond interchange just north of the river. As the road heads through the downtown area with Amtrak's Northeast Corridor railroad line running next to the route on the east side, it has a southbound exit and entrance with Warren Street that provides access to the New Jersey State House. It then comes to an interchange with the northern terminus of Route 129 as well as the western terminus of Route 33 near the Trenton Transit Center serving Amtrak, NJ Transit's Northeast Corridor and River lines, and SEPTA's Trenton Line.

At this point, the Trenton Freeway turns onto a depressed alignment, with Conrail Shared Assets Operations (CSAO)'s Port Running Track railroad line closely parallel to the east, and comes to an interchange with Perry Street. The route turns northeast directly over the Delaware and Raritan Canal (D&R Canal), which still flows underneath, and has an exit for Olden Avenue. The freeway has a northbound ramp for Mulberry Street before the parallel railroad tracks curve east away from the road and there is a northbound exit and southbound entrance from the median that provides access to US 1 Bus. and US 206. Past this interchange, US 1 continues into Lawrence Township, where the surroundings become more wooded as the freeway has an exit for Whitehead Road. Along this stretch, the freeway closely parallels the canal, which emerges from under the freeway just north of Mulberry Street. The Trenton Freeway ends at the point US 1 Bus. merges back into US 1 at a southbound exit and northbound entrance.

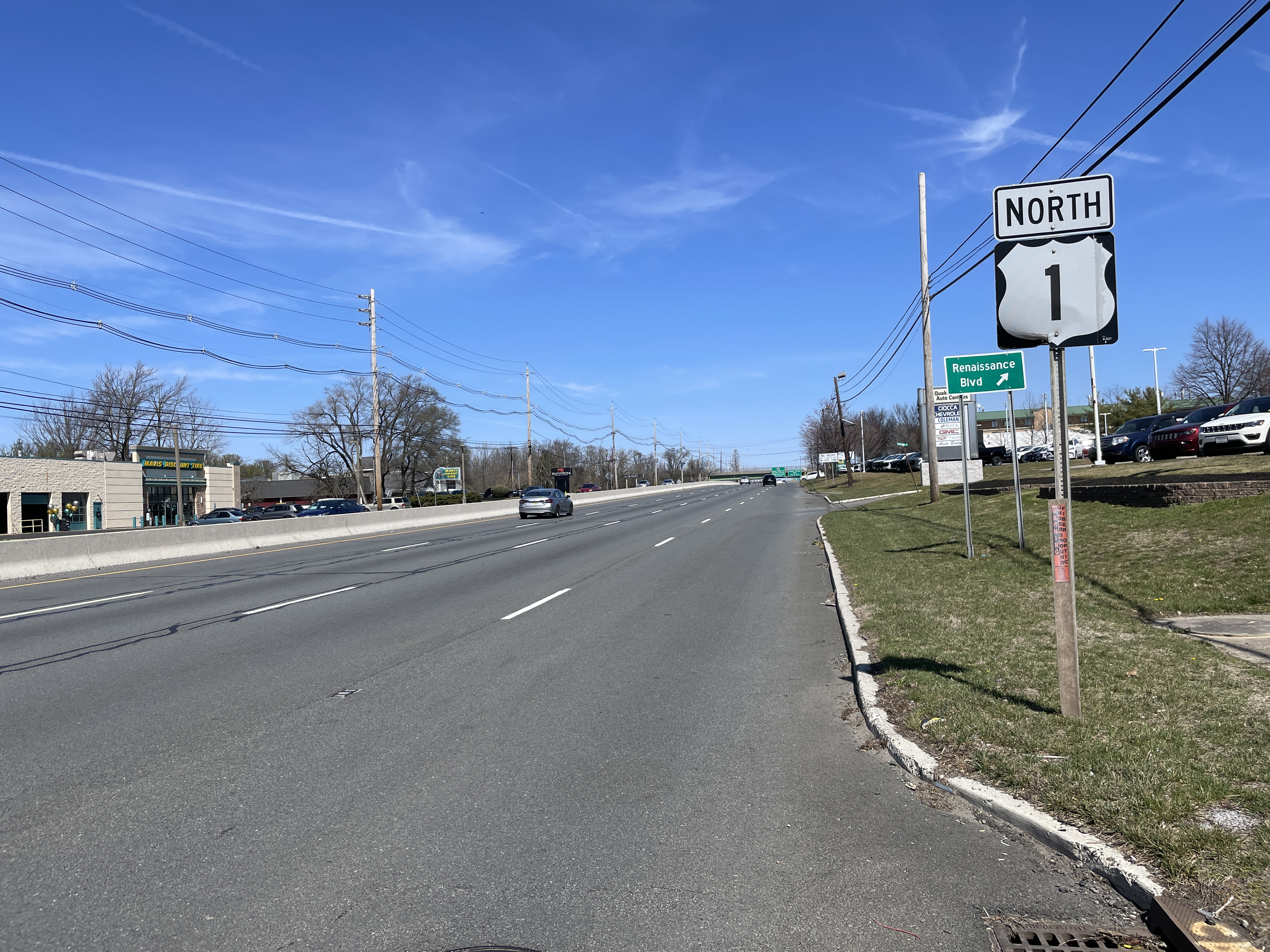
US 1 northbound past CR 638 in Lawrence Township

Here, US 1 becomes a four-lane arterial road with jughandles called the Herbert Highway (named after John Warne Herbert Jr., the former chairman of the State Highway Commission) that is lined with suburban businesses. Continuing northeast, the first intersection along this road is with the eastern terminus of County Route 546 (CR 546; Franklin Corner Road). After this intersection, the road crosses the D&R Canal again prior to a modified cloverleaf interchange with I-295. Past this point, US 1 widens to six lanes as it has an interchange providing access to Quaker Bridge Mall to the southeast of the route. A short distance later, the road enters West Windsor and reaches a cloverleaf interchange with CR 533 (Quakerbridge Road). After an interchange with Meadow Road, US 1 passes southeast of the MarketFair shopping mall and continues past corporate parks prior to an interchange with Alexander Road. Following this interchange, the road passes under NJ Transit's Princeton Branch railroad line and comes to CR 571 (also signed as CR 526) at the modified Penns Neck Circle, which US 1 runs straight through. Past this intersection, the road passes near farmland.

Studies are being conducted to implement the Central New Jersey Route 1 BRT, a bus rapid transit system utilizing the highway that would radiate from Princeton Junction station.

=== Middlesex County ===
Upon crossing the Millstone River, US 1 enters Plainsboro Township, where it passes more business parks and comes to an interchange with Scudders Mill Road. Past Scudders Mill Road, the road runs to the west of the James Forrestal Campus of Princeton University before passing to the east of the Forrestal Village retail and office complex. An interchange with College Road a short distance later provides access to both places. The route continues into South Brunswick, where it narrows to four lanes and runs through a mix of rural areas and development. US 1 briefly widens back to six lanes as it reaches an intersection with CR 522. Past CR 522, the surroundings of the four-lane road become more forested, with a few commercial establishments. The road briefly forms the border between South Brunswick to the northwest and North Brunswick to the southeast before fully entering North Brunswick.

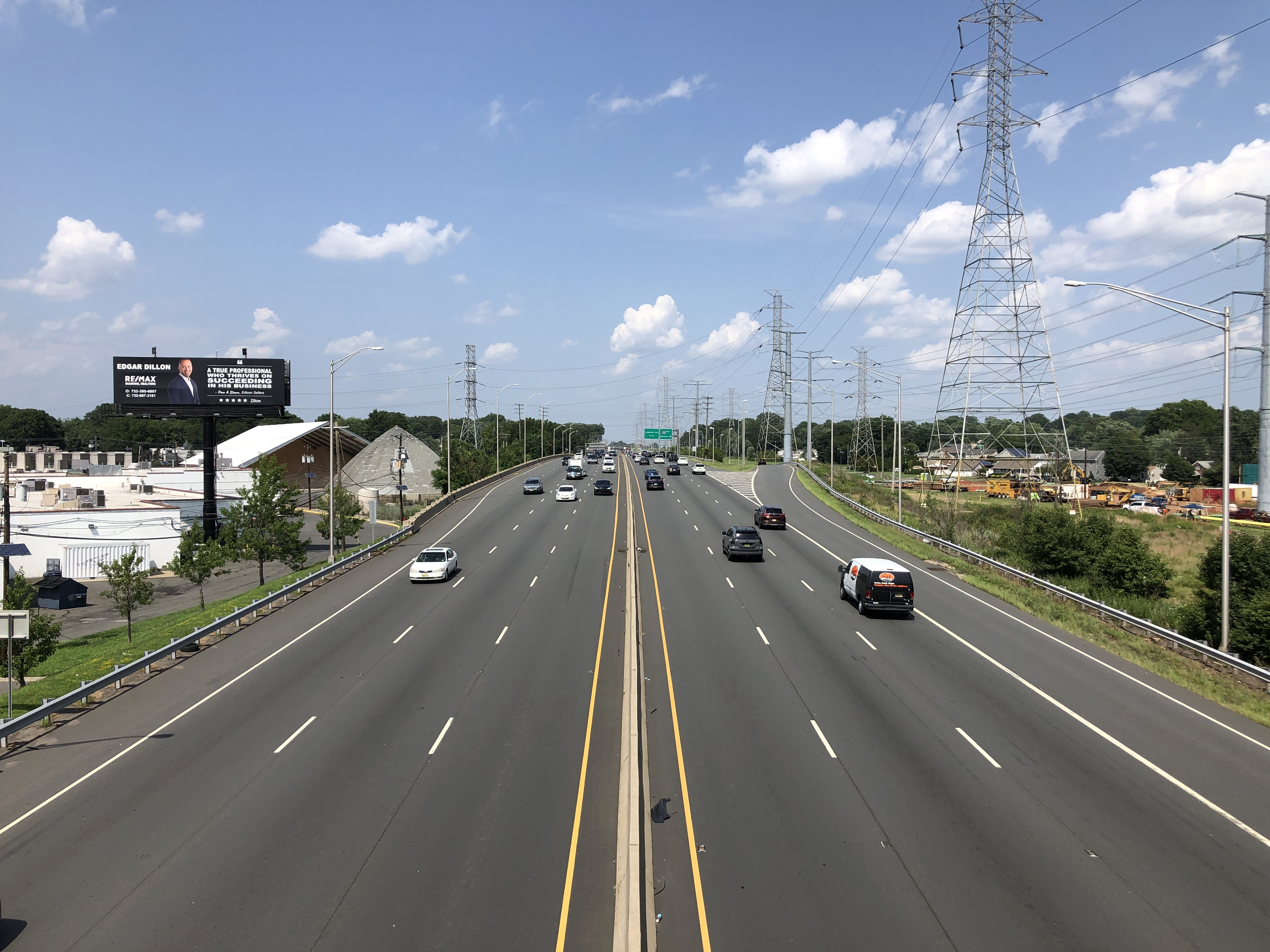
US 1 northbound past I-287 in Edison Township

Here, the route widens to six lanes again and comes to an interchange with the southern terminus of Route 91 (Jersey Avenue), where US 1 makes a turn to the east-northeast. Immediately after this interchange, the route passes over Amtrak’s Northeast Corridor and comes to an exit for the south end of Route 26 (Livingston Avenue). The road reaches the northern terminus of US 130 and the southern terminus of Route 171 (Georges Road) at an interchange. A short distance later, US 1 has access to Milltown Road through an interchange. The road passes by Rutgers University college farm before turning northeast and coming to a cloverleaf interchange with Ryders Lane. After this interchange, US 1 crosses into New Brunswick, where it has an interchange with Route 18/CR 527.

Upon crossing the Raritan River on the Donald and Morris Goodkind Bridges, US 1 enters Edison and continues north into developed suburban areas before turning northeast and meeting CR 514 (Woodbridge Avenue) at an interchange. A short distance later, the route crosses CR 529 (Plainfield Avenue) at an at-grade intersection. Lined with businesses, the road continues across CSAO's Bonhamtown Industrial Track railroad line and comes to two close interchanges with CR 531 (Main Street) and I-287. Past here, US 1 passes under the Middlesex Greenway and comes to an interchange with CR 501 (Amboy Avenue). In this area, US 1 passes to the east of Menlo Park Mall, with an interchange at Menlo Park Drive providing access. The route continues northeast into Woodbridge Township, where it comes to a partial interchange with the Garden State Parkway. Following this interchange, US 1 comes to the Woodbridge Center shopping mall on the east side of the road. US 1 passes over CSAO's Port Reading Secondary railroad line and crosses Green Street (CR 604) prior to merging with US 9 at a southbound exit and northbound entrance.

=== US 1/9 concurrency ===
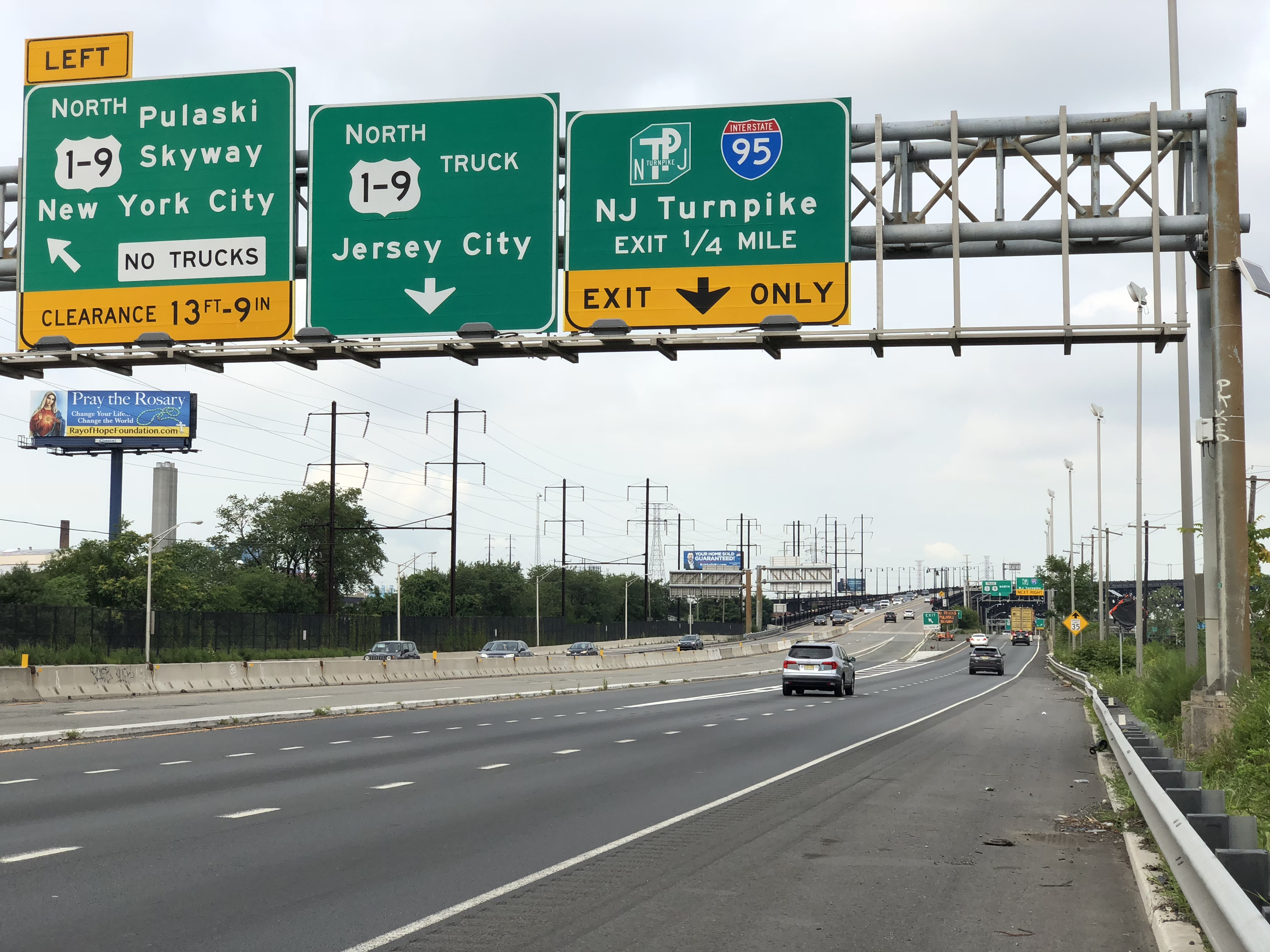
US 1/9 northbound at the beginning of US 1/9 Truck in Newark

US 1 and US 9 become concurrent upon merging in Woodbridge Township and continue through developed areas, interchanging with Route 35. Upon entering Union County, US 1/9 pass through Rahway and Linden, interchanging with I-278 in Linden. The road continues into urban Elizabeth, crossing Route 439 before turning into a freeway prior to meeting Route 81 near Newark Liberty International Airport. US 1/9 continues along the west end of the airport into Newark, Essex County, reaching the Newark Airport Interchange with I-78, US 22, and Route 21.

From this interchange, the road continues northeast through industrial areas to an interchange with US 1/9 Truck that provides access to the New Jersey Turnpike (I-95). US 1/9 continue onto the Pulaski Skyway, which carries the route over the Passaic River into Hudson County, crossing over Kearny and the Hackensack River before coming into Jersey City. Trucks are banned from the Pulaski Skyway and must use US 1/9 Truck to bypass it.

The Pulaski Skyway ends at the Tonnele Circle with US 1/9 Truck and Route 139, and US 1/9 continues north along at-grade Tonnelle Avenue toward North Bergen, where the road intersects Route 3 and Route 495. Crossing into Bergen County, Broad Avenue carries US 1/9 through Fairview and Ridgefield before heading into Palisades Park. Here, the two routes join US 46, and the combined road heads north into Fort Lee. US 1/9/US 46 come to an interchange with I-95, US 9W, and Route 4, where it joins I-95 to head east to the George Washington Bridge over the Hudson River. At this point, US 46 ends and I-95 and US 1/9 continue into Manhattan, New York City on the Trans-Manhattan Expressway.

== History ==
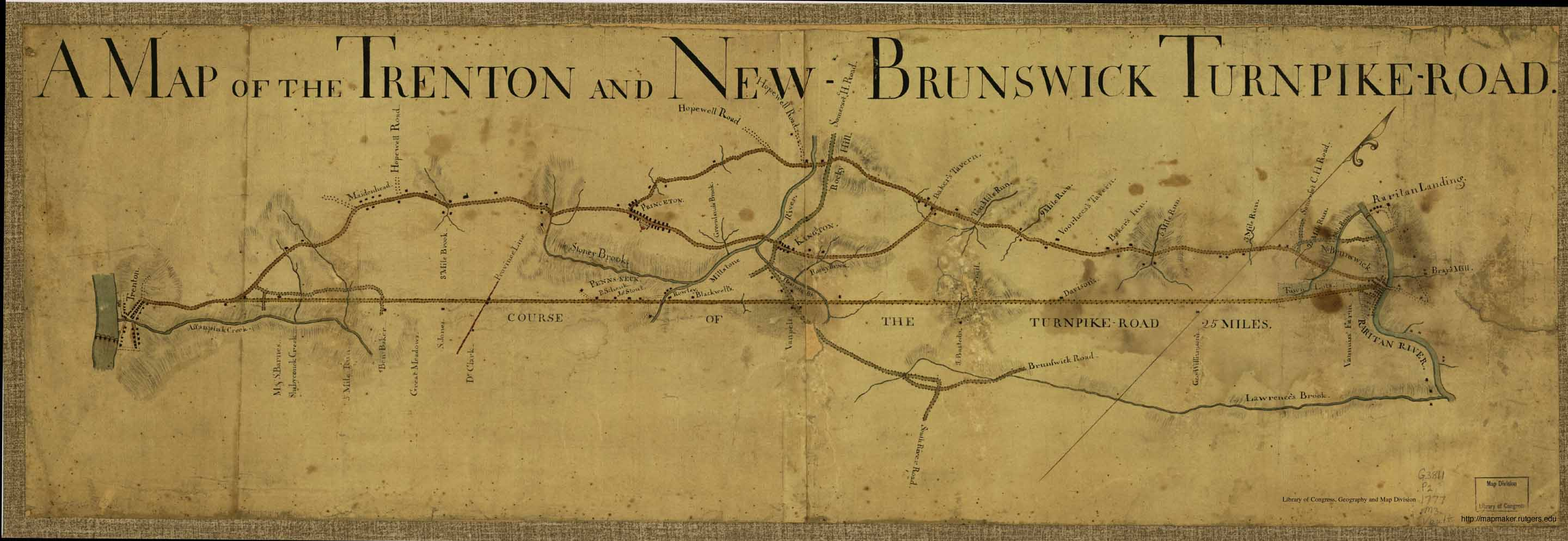
Hand-drawn map of the planned Trenton and New Brunswick Turnpike, c. 1777

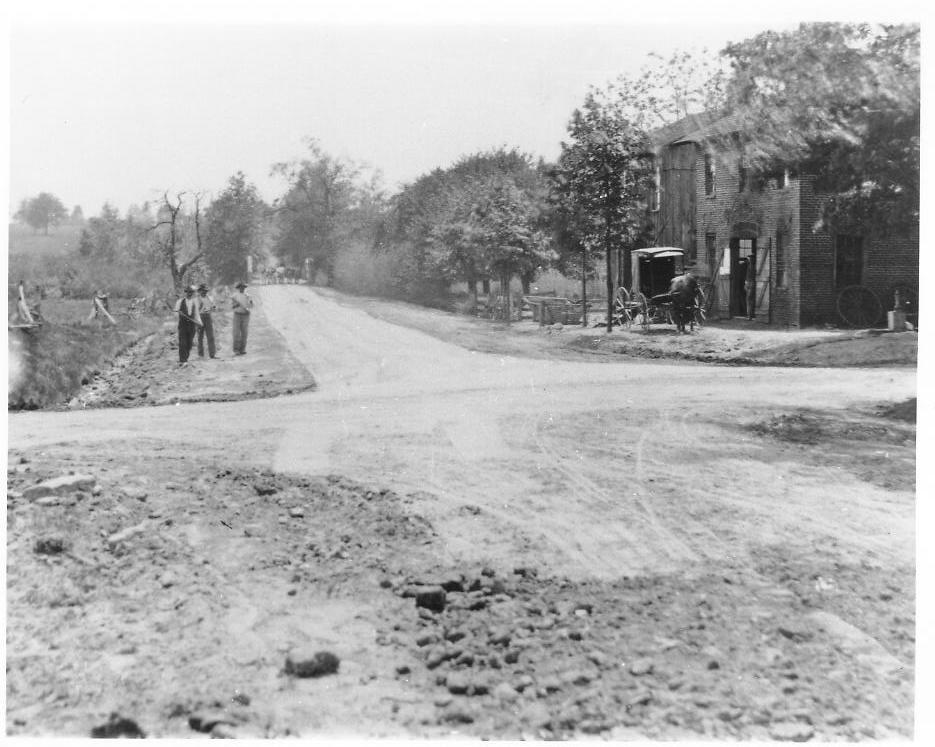
View of the turnpike in Plainsboro, 1904

What is now US 1 between Trenton and New Brunswick was originally chartered as the Trenton and New Brunswick Turnpike in 1803. Throughout its history, the Trenton and New Brunswick Turnpike faced stiff competition from canals such as the D&R Canal and railroads such as the Camden and Amboy Railroad. In the later part of the 19th century, the turnpike company folded and the Pennsylvania Railroad took over ownership of the turnpike. When the charter for the Trenton and New Brunswick Turnpike expired in 1903, it became a public road. When the first numbered highways were legislated in New Jersey in 1916, the present day US 1 between New Brunswick and Elizabeth was to become a part of Route 1, a route that was to connect Trenton and Elizabeth. Between Trenton and New Brunswick, this route was to follow present-day Route 33 and US 130. In 1922, an extension of Route 1 was legislated to continue north from Elizabeth to the Holland Tunnel in Jersey City.

When the U.S. Highway System was established in 1926, the routing of US 1 in New Jersey was to follow the Lincoln Highway from the Lower Trenton Bridge in Trenton to Newark, which was Route 13 between Trenton and New Brunswick and Route 1 north of there. From Newark, the route followed present-day US 1/9 Truck east toward Jersey City, where it was to head to the Holland Tunnel. The Lincoln Highway the first transcontinental highway in the U.S. created in 1913 to link New York City to San Francisco. Route 13 had been legislated along the Trenton to New Brunswick portion in 1917.

Route S26, 1927–1953

In the 1927 New Jersey state highway renumbering, the alignment of US 1 between Trenton and Newark became Route 27, while the proposed Route 1 Extension became part of Route 25. In addition, Route 26 was designated along the former Trenton and New Brunswick Turnpike, while the current US 1 between Route 26 and US 130 became Route S26. North of current US 130, present-day US 1 to Newark also became a part of Route 25. The current US 1/9 between the Tonnele Circle and the George Washington Bridge meanwhile became parts of Route 1 and Route 6. The Route 1 Extension, now designated Route 25, was complete in 1928 with the exception of the Pulaski Skyway. This road was considered the first superhighway in the U.S. After the Pulaski Skyway opened in 1932, US 1 along with US 9 was rerouted to use it. By the 1930s, US 1 was routed to use Route 26, Route S26, and Route 25 between Trenton and Newark instead of Route 27. US 1 and US 9 were routed to use the George Washington Bridge over the Hudson River instead of the Holland Tunnel by the 1940s, following Route 1 and US 46/Route 6 between the Tonnele Circle and the George Washington Bridge.

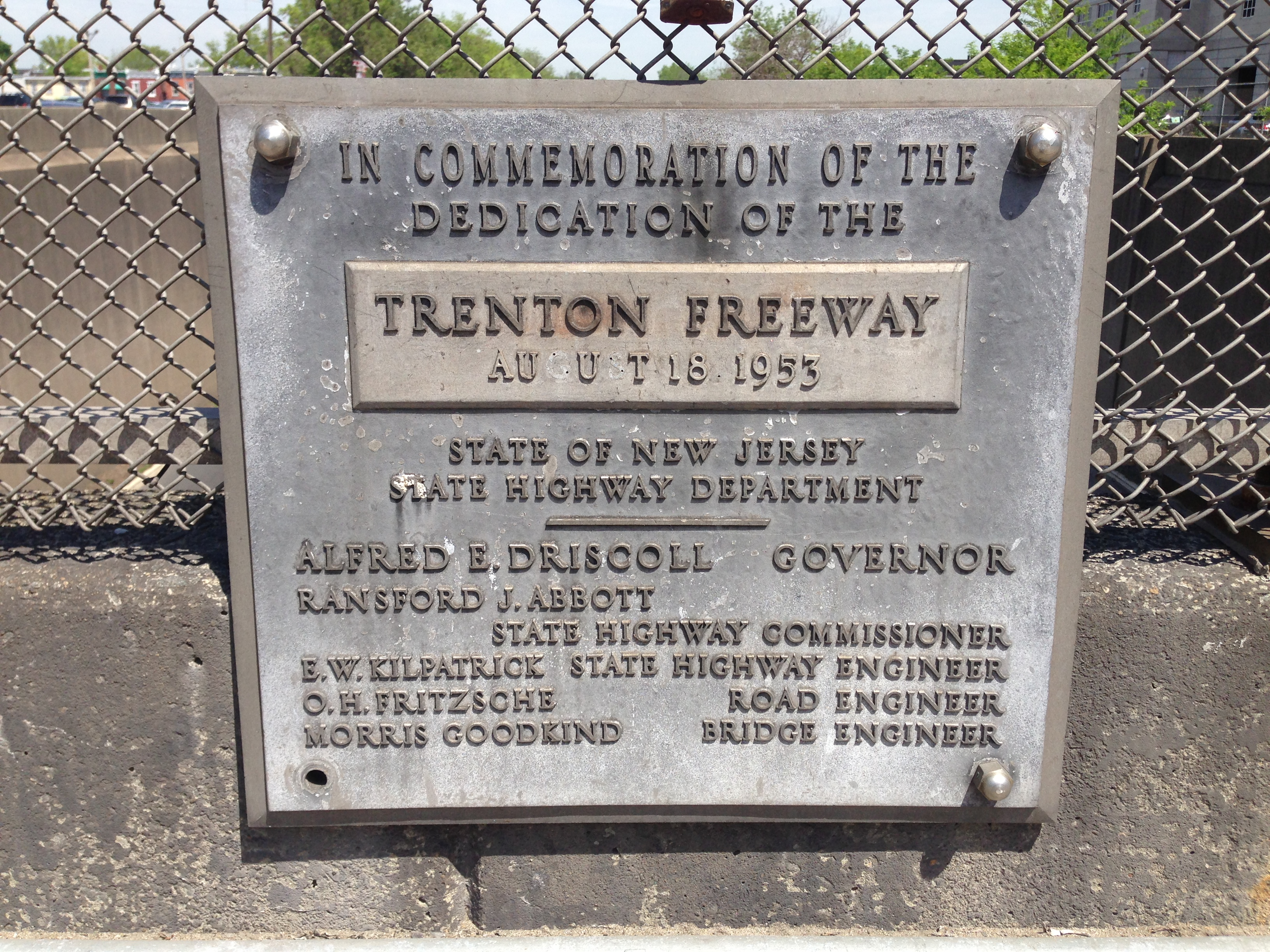
Trenton Freeway dedication plaque, 1953

The Trenton Freeway, a freeway through Trenton, was first planned in 1950 to provide a bypass of Trenton and a connection to the new Trenton–Morrisville Toll Bridge. This freeway opened in December 1952 and became part of both US 1 and Route 26. In the 1953 New Jersey state highway renumbering that followed a month later, all the state highways running concurrent with US 1 were removed. In addition, US 1/9 Truck was designated as a bypass of the Pulaski Skyway (replacing Route 25T) and US 1/9 Bus. (now Route 139) was designated on the former Route 25 between the Tonnele Circle and the Holland Tunnel. Also, after the US 1 designation was moved to the Trenton Freeway, the former route through Trenton would become US 1 Alt.

During the development of the Interstate Highway System, New Jersey and Pennsylvania considered having I-95 cross over the Trenton–Morrisville Toll Bridge and continue north on the existing US 1. The project was opposed due to inadequate highway standards (lack of shoulder ramps, and only two lanes in each direction). During this time, both states sought alternate routes for the proposed I-95. In 1960, New Jersey and Pennsylvania decided to designate the Scudder Falls Bridge as I-95. By 1969, an extension of the Trenton Freeway from the current left-hand exit to US 1 Bus./US 206 to Whitehead Road was completed and received the Route 174 designation.

In 1967, NJDOT recommended an extension of the Trenton Freeway from Whitehead Road to the traffic light at Bakers Basin Road and Franklin Corner Road. Once the extension was completed by the 1980s, the route number was then changed from Route 174 to US 1. The former alignment of US 1 along surface streets in Trenton was renumbered to US 1 Bus., while the US 1 Alt. designation was dropped.

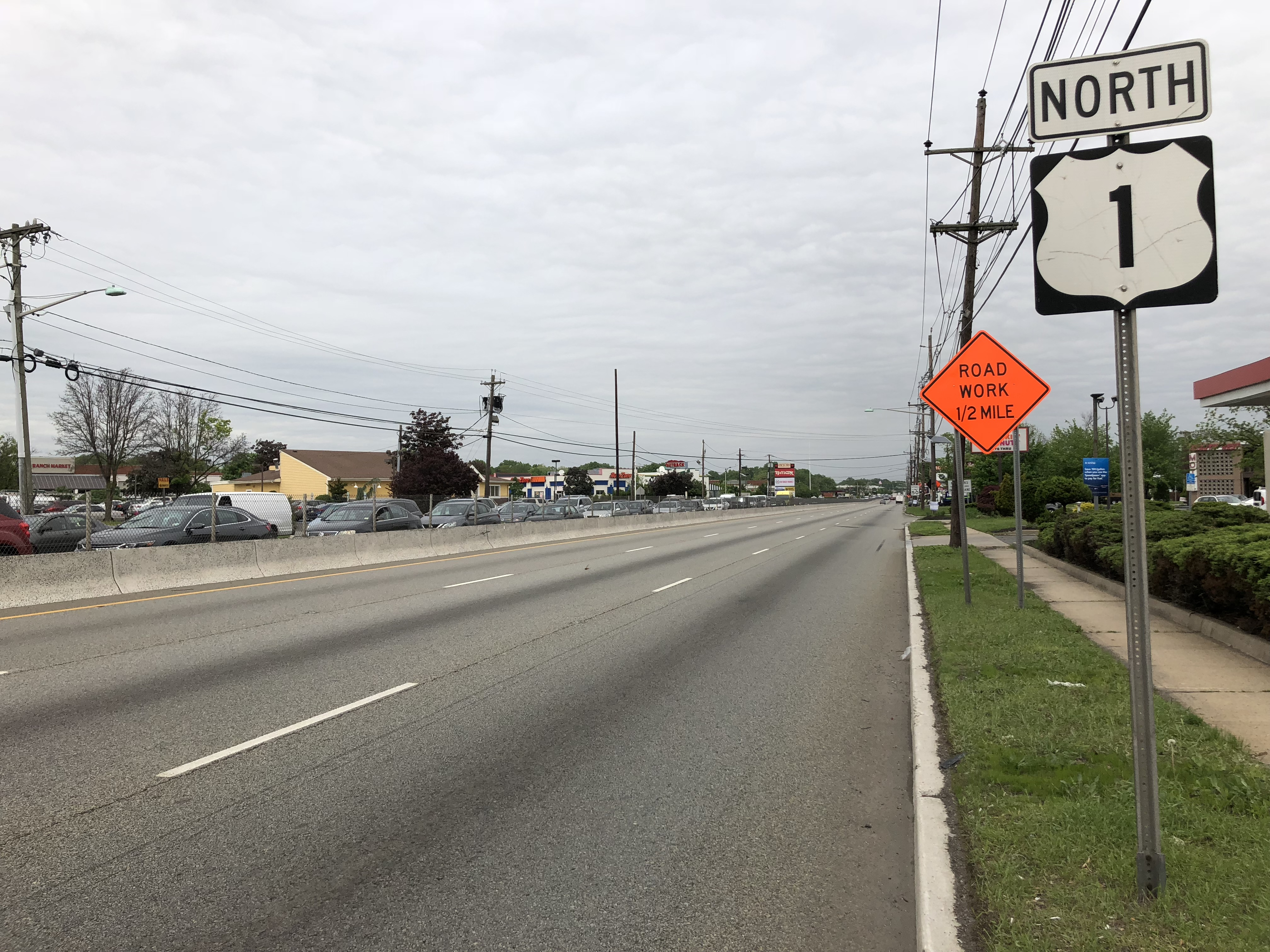
US 1 northbound past CR 529 in Edison Township

There had been plans to create a west–east spur of the New Jersey Turnpike called Route 92. It was to begin just north of the intersection of Ridge Road and US 1 in South Brunswick and terminate at the mainline of the New Jersey Turnpike (I-95) at exit 8A in Monroe Township. This proposal was cancelled on December 1, 2006, after the New Jersey Turnpike Authority decided to use funds to widen the mainline turnpike instead.

By the 1990s, many traffic lights along the segment of US 1 in West Windsor and Plainsboro were removed and replaced with exit ramps and overpasses. As a result, the traffic lights at Scudders Mill, Plainsboro, Alexander, and Meadow roads were eliminated. This was followed by building ramps to replace the traffic light at US 130 and US 1 located North Brunswick, completed in 2003. An environmental impact study has been conducted by Rutgers University’s Transportation Policy Institute and Center for Negotiation and Conflict Resolution to improve US 1 through the Penns Neck area. This project would eliminate the Penns Neck Circle where US 1 meets Washington Road (CR 571) and move US 1 onto a new freeway alignment in the area. In addition, CR 571 is planned to be realigned to intersect US 1 further to the north. In 2009, the segment of US 1 between I-287 in Edison and the Garden State Parkway in Woodbridge was rebuilt to include new ramps at several intersections and removed access to a couple of roads in a $53.9-million (equivalent to $76.4 million in 2024) project that was intended to alleviate traffic and make this section safer.

In 2013, the road was one of three that tied for the #1 ranking on the Tri-State Transportation Campaign's list of the top 10 most dangerous roads for pedestrians in New Jersey, New York, and Connecticut. The route, along with US 40/US 322 in Atlantic County and US 130 (Burlington Pike) in Burlington County, were so ranked due to the nine pedestrian deaths that occurred on each of those roads from 2009 to 2011.

== Major intersections ==
County	Location	mi	km	Exit	Destinations	Notes
Delaware River		0.00	0.00		US 1 south – Philadelphia	Continuation into Pennsylvania
Delaware River		0.00	0.00	Trenton–Morrisville Toll Bridge (southbound toll in Pennsylvania)		
Mercer	Trenton	0.10	0.16		Route 29 (John Fitch Way)	Northbound exit and southbound entrance; access to Trenton Thunder Ballpark
Mercer	Trenton	0.28	0.45		Warren Street – Capitol Complex	Southbound exit and entrance; last southbound exit before toll
Mercer	Trenton	0.76	1.22		Route 129 south to I-195 east / I-295 / South Broad Street (US 206) – Chambersburg	Southbound exit and northbound entrance; northern terminus of Route 129
Mercer	Trenton	0.90	1.45		Route 33 east (Market Street) / South Clinton Avenue / State Street – Train Station	Western terminus of Route 33
Mercer	Trenton	1.34	2.16		Perry Street	
Mercer	Trenton	2.37	3.81		Olden Avenue (CR 622) / New York Avenue	
Mercer	Trenton	2.72	4.38		Mulberry Street	Northbound exit and entrance
Mercer	Trenton	2.87	4.62		US 1 Bus. north / US 206 north – Lawrenceville	Northbound exit and southbound entrance
Mercer	Lawrence Township	3.75	6.04		Whitehead Road (CR 616)	
Mercer	Lawrence Township	5.24	8.43		US 1 Bus. south – North Trenton	Southbound exit and northbound entrance
Mercer	Lawrence Township	5.24	8.43	Northern end of freeway section		
Mercer	Lawrence Township	5.98	9.62		CR 546 west (Franklin Corner Road) – Lawrenceville	
Mercer	Lawrence Township	6.76	10.88		I-295 to I-95 south – Camden, Philadelphia	Exits 67A-B on I-295; former I-95
Mercer	Lawrence Township	7.55	12.15		Quaker Bridge Mall	Interchange; access via Outer Ring Road
Mercer	West Windsor Township	8.10	13.04		CR 533 (Province Line Road / Quaker Bridge Road) / Nassau Park Boulevard	Interchange
Mercer	West Windsor Township	9.45	15.21		Meadow Road – Carnegie Center	Interchange
Mercer	West Windsor Township	10.86	17.48		Alexander Road – Princeton, Princeton Junction	Interchange
Mercer	West Windsor Township	11.21	18.04		CR 571 (Washington Road) – Hightstown, Princeton	Penns Neck Circle
Middlesex	Plainsboro Township	12.47	20.07		CR 614 east (Scudders Mill Road)	Interchange
Middlesex	Plainsboro Township	12.93	20.81		Forrestal Road	Interchange
Middlesex	Plainsboro Township	13.70	22.05		College Road – Forrestal Center, Forrestal Village	Interchange
Middlesex	South Brunswick	16.47	26.51		CR 522 east (Stouts Lane)	
Middlesex	North Brunswick	22.90	36.85		Route 91 north (Jersey Avenue) – New Brunswick	Interchange; southern terminus of Route 91
Middlesex	North Brunswick	23.05	37.10		Route 26 north (Livingston Avenue) – New Brunswick	Interchange; southern terminus of Route 26
Middlesex	North Brunswick	24.64	39.65		US 130 south / Route 171 north (Georges Road) / Milltown Road – Camden, New Brunswick	Interchange; northern terminus of US 130; southern terminus of Route 171; no southbound access to Milltown Road
Middlesex	New Brunswick	27.19	43.76		Route 18 (CR 527) to I-95 Toll / N.J. Turnpike – East Brunswick	Interchange
Middlesex	Raritan River	27.90	44.90	Donald and Morris Goodkind Bridges		
Middlesex	Edison Township	28.54	45.93		CR 514 – Highland Park, Raritan Center, Woodbridge Township	Interchange
Middlesex	Edison Township	29.06	46.77		CR 529 (Plainfield Avenue) – Piscataway, Dunellen	
Middlesex	Edison Township	31.66	50.95		CR 531 (Main Street) – Metuchen, Bonhamtown	Interchange
Middlesex	Edison Township	31.96	51.43		I-287 to I-95 Toll / N.J. Turnpike / Route 440 north – Morristown, Mahwah, Raritan Center, Perth Amboy	Exits 1A-B on I-287
Middlesex	Edison Township	32.73	52.67		CR 501 (Amboy Avenue) – Fords, Metuchen	Interchange
Middlesex	Edison Township	33.42	53.78		Menlo Park Drive	Interchange
Middlesex	Woodbridge Township	34.55	55.60		G.S. Parkway north	Exits 130A-B on G.S. Parkway
Middlesex	Woodbridge Township	35.89	57.76		US 9 south – Shore Points	Interchange; southbound exit and northbound entrance; southern end of US 9 concurrency
Middlesex	Woodbridge Township	36.42	58.61		Route 35 – The Amboys, Rahway	Interchange
Middlesex	Woodbridge Township	37.76	60.77		South Inman Avenue / Rodgers Street	Interchange
Union	Rahway	38.85	62.52		CR 514 (Lawrence Street) – Rahway, Woodbridge Township	Interchange; southbound exit and entrance
Union	Linden	42.30	68.08		I-278 east to I-95 Toll / N.J. Turnpike – Goethals Bridge, Staten Island	Interchange; northbound exit and southbound entrance; western terminus of I-278
Union	Elizabeth	43.11	69.38		Route 439 (South Elmora Avenue / Bayway Avenue) – Roselle, Plainfield, Staten Island, Goethals Bridge	Bayway Circle
Union	Elizabeth	45.44	73.13	Southern end of freeway section		
Union	Elizabeth	45.73	73.60		To I-95 Toll / N.J. Turnpike / Dowd Avenue – Elizabeth Seaport	Access via Route 81; no northbound exit
Union	Elizabeth	46.00	74.03		Service Road	Southbound exit and entrance
Essex	Newark	46.28	74.48		McClellan Street	
Essex	Newark	46.75	75.24		Newark Liberty International Airport	Newark Airport Interchange
Essex	Newark	47.10	75.80		I-78 to I-95 Toll / N.J. Turnpike	Northbound exit and southbound entrance; Newark Airport Interchange; exits 58A-B on I-78
Essex	Newark	47.35	76.20		Haynes Avenue	
Essex	Newark	47.64– 47.84	76.67– 76.99		US 22 west / Route 21 north – Hillside, Downtown Newark	Newark Airport Interchange; eastern terminus of US 22; southern terminus of Route 21
Essex	Newark	48.00	77.25		South Area	Northbound exit and entrance; Newark Airport Interchange
Essex	Newark	48.00	77.25		Executive Drive	Southbound exit and entrance
Essex	Newark	48.60	78.21		Port Newark, North Area, South Area	Newark Airport Interchange
Essex	Newark	48.90	78.70		I-78 to I-95 Toll / N.J. Turnpike / G.S. Parkway	Newark Airport Interchange
Essex	Newark	49.00	78.86		Frontage Road	
Essex	Newark	49.55	79.74		Delancy Street – Newark	Northbound exit and southbound entrance
Essex	Newark	49.91	80.32		Wilson Avenue – Newark	Southbound exit and northbound entrance
Essex	Newark	51.43	82.77		I-95 Toll / N.J. Turnpike / US 1-9 Truck north	Northbound exit and southbound entrance; all trucks must exit; southern terminus of US 1-9 Truck; exit 15E on I-95 / Turnpike
Essex	Newark	51.43	82.77		Raymond Boulevard – Newark	Southbound exit and entrance
Passaic River		51.85	83.44	Pulaski Skyway		
Hudson	Kearny	52.33	84.22		South Kearny	Southbound exit and northbound entrance; access via Adams Street
Hudson	Hackensack River	53.06	85.39	Pulaski Skyway		
Hudson	Jersey City	54.00	86.90		Broadway	Northbound exit and southbound entrance
Hudson	Jersey City	54.61	87.89		US 1-9 Truck south / Route 139 east / Tonnele Avenue to Route 7 west – Hoboken, Jersey City, Holland Tunnel	Tonnele Circle; no northbound access to US 1-9 Truck; all trucks must exit
Hudson	Jersey City	54.61	87.89	Northern end of freeway section		
Hudson	Jersey City	56.24	90.51		Secaucus Road (CR 678) – Jersey City	Interchange
Hudson	North Bergen	57.27	92.17		Route 3 west / Route 495 to I-95 Toll / N.J. Turnpike – Clifton, Lincoln Tunnel	No northbound entrance; eastern terminus of Route 3
Hudson	North Bergen	57.74	92.92		Paterson Plank Road (CR 681) / West Side Avenue / Union Turnpike (CR 676)	Interchange
Bergen	Ridgefield	62.14	100.00		Route 93 north (Grand Avenue)	Northbound exit and southbound entrance
Bergen	Ridgefield	62.52	100.62		Route 5 east	
Bergen	Palisades Park	62.80	101.07		US 46 west to I-95 Toll south / N.J. Turnpike south / I-80 west	Interchange; southern end of US 46 concurrency
Bergen	Palisades Park	63.51	102.21		CR 501 (East Central Boulevard) – Palisades Park	Interchange; access via 5th/6th Streets
Bergen	Fort Lee	63.95	102.92		Route 63 south (Bergen Boulevard)	Interchange; southbound exit and northbound entrance; northern terminus of Route 63
Bergen	Fort Lee	64.49	103.79		Main Street (CR 56) – Fort Lee, Leonia	Interchange
Bergen	Fort Lee	64.88	104.41	Southern end of freeway section		
Bergen	Fort Lee	64.88	104.41		US 9W north / Route 4 west to Palisades Parkway north – Fort Lee	Northbound exit and southbound entrance; Route 4 not signed
Bergen	Fort Lee	65.30	105.09	72B	I-95 south / N.J. Turnpike south / Route 4 west to I-80 west / G.S. Parkway – Hackensack, Paterson	Southbound exit and northbound entrance; southern end of I-95 concurrency; northern terminus of N.J. Turnpike; eastern terminus of Route 4
Bergen	Fort Lee	65.46	105.35	73	Route 67 / Hudson Terrace (CR 505) to US 9W / Palisades Parkway north – Fort Lee	Signed for US 9W/Hudson Terrace southbound, Palisades northbound; last northbound exit before toll
Bergen	Fort Lee	65.60	105.57	74	Palisades Parkway north	Southbound exit and northbound entrance from express lanes; southern terminus of Palisades Parkway
Hudson River		66.06	106.31	George Washington Bridge (northbound toll; Pay-by-Plate or E-ZPass)		
Hudson River		66.06	106.31		I-95 north / US 1-9 north – New York City US 46 ends	Continuation into New York at the river’s center; eastern terminus of US 46
1.000 mi = 1.609 km; 1.000 km = 0.621 mi: Concurrency terminus; Electronic toll collection; Incomplete access; Tolled

== Related routes ==
There are two remaining bannered spurs of US 1 in the state of New Jersey:

- U.S. Route 1 Business in Trenton
- U.S. Route 1/9 Truck in Jersey City

The following state highway was also formerly designated as a bannered spur of US 1:

- Route 139 in Jersey City was formerly U.S. Route 1/9 Business.

== See also ==
U.S. Route 1
Previous state: Pennsylvania	New Jersey	Next state: New York

Lincoln Highway
Previous state: Pennsylvania	New Jersey	Next state: New York
