= Trenton–Morrisville Toll Bridge =

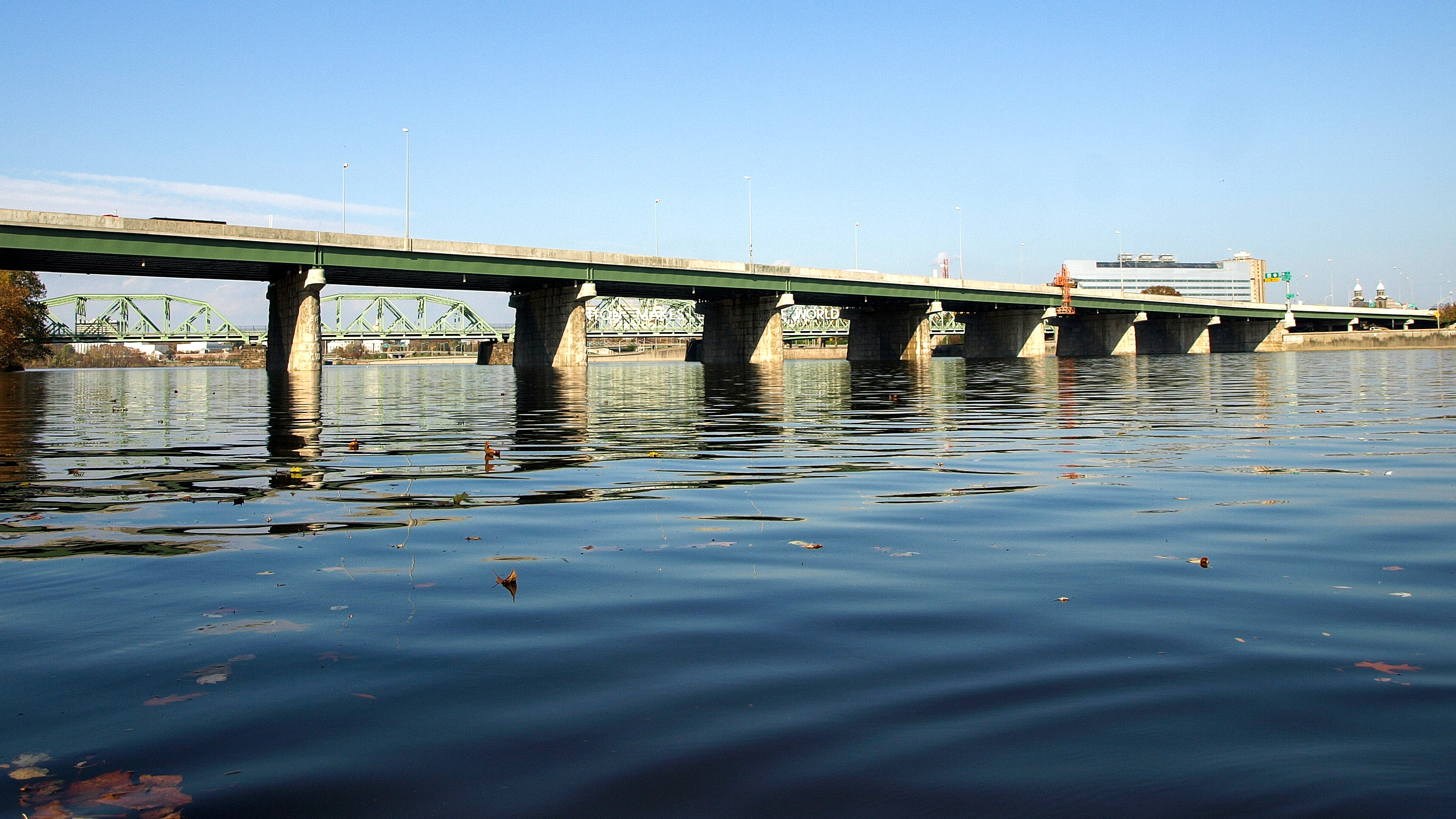
- Bridge in 2009
- Coordinates: 40.2092°N 74.7677°W
- Carries: 6 lanes of US 1
- Crosses: Delaware River
- Locale: Morrisville, Pennsylvania and Trenton, New Jersey
- Maintained by: Delaware River Joint Toll Bridge Commission

Characteristics
- Total length: 403.56 meters (1,324 feet)
- Width: 18.90 meters (62 feet)

History
- Opened: December 1, 1952

Statistics
- Toll: Southbound: $5.00 for cars without E-ZPass $2.00 for cars with E-ZPass

Location
- Interactive map of Trenton–Morrisville Toll Bridge

The Trenton–Morrisville Toll Bridge is one of three road bridges connecting Trenton, New Jersey with Morrisville, Pennsylvania. Opened on December 1, 1952, it carries U.S. Route 1 (US 1) and is owned and operated by the Delaware River Joint Toll Bridge Commission.

Construction of the bridge took two years to complete, and cost $6,650,000.

== History and architectural features ==
Opened to traffic on December 1, 1952, following brief ribbon-cutting ceremonies that were conducted on the bridge and presided over by Henry T. Shelly, a vice president of the Delaware River Joint Toll Bridge Commission and former mayor of Milford, New Jersey, the new Trenton–Morrisville Toll Bridge was first crossed by automobiles driven by a railroad conductor and a salesman, Joseph E. Wooley, of Bristol, Pennsylvania.

This bridge's toll plaza was originally configured to collect tolls from both the northbound and southbound travel lanes. Today, tolls are collected only from vehicles travelling southbound (entering Pennsylvania/leaving New Jersey).

Beginning in 2006, the Trenton–Morrisville Toll Bridge underwent renovation work to expand and rehabilitate the bridge and auxiliary structures. Improvements included the addition of a third northbound lane on the main bridge, installing a new soundwall along Northbound US 1 in Pennsylvania as well as lengthening deceleration lanes. This $67 million project was designed by the Louis Berger Group and awarded to Conti Enterprises Incorporated, and concluded in 2009.

== See also ==
- List of crossings of the Delaware River
