= List of county routes in Mercer County, New Jersey =

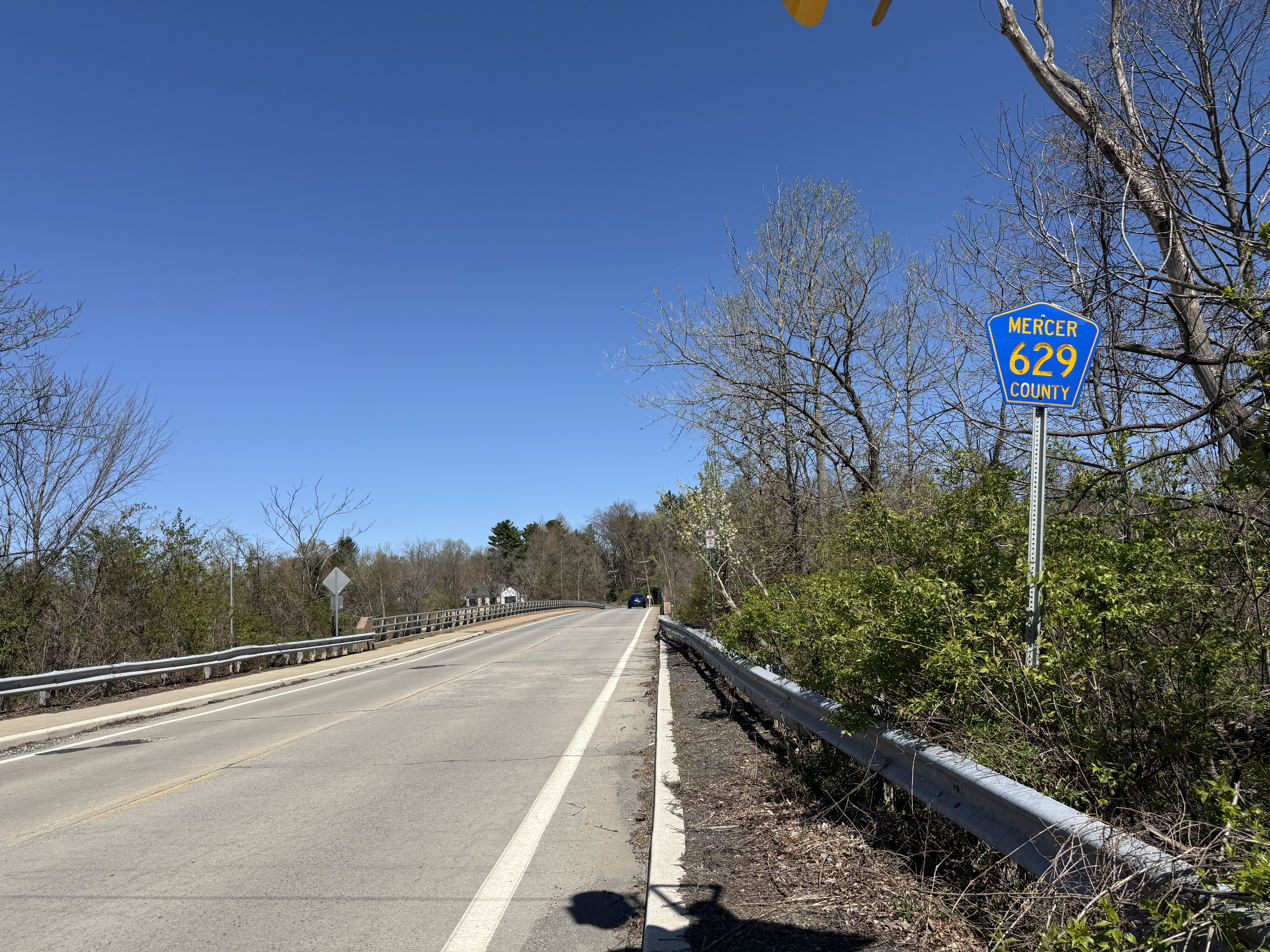
CR 629 northbound in Princeton

The following is a list of county routes in Mercer County in the U.S. state of New Jersey. For more information on the county route system in New Jersey as a whole, including its history, see County routes in New Jersey.

== 500-series county routes ==
In addition to those listed below, the following 500-series county routes serve Mercer County:

- CR 518, CR 524, CR 526, CR 533, CR 535, CR 539, CR 546, CR 569, CR 571, CR 579, CR 583

== Other county routes ==
Route	Length (mi)	Length (km)	From	Via	To	Notes
CR 600	1.69	2.72	Bear Tavern Road (CR 579) in Ewing	Sam Weinroth Road	Scotch Road (CR 611) in Ewing	
CR 601	0.37	0.60	Bear Tavern Road (CR 579) in Ewing	Sam Weinroth Road	Unnamed road in Ewing	Merged with CR 600
CR 602	0.64	1.03	Old Trenton Road (CR 535) in West Windsor	South Post Road	Dead end in West Windsor	
CR 604	2.95	4.75	Carter Road (CR 569) in Lawrence Township	Rosedale Road, Elm Road	Stockton Street (US 206) in Princeton	
CR 605	0.76	1.22	Route 27 in Princeton	River Road	River Road (CR 605) at the Somerset County line in Princeton	
CR 606	3.57	5.75	South Broad Street (US 206) in Trenton	Hamilton Avenue	Nottingham Way (Route 33) in Hamilton	
CR 607	0.37	0.60	North Mill Road in West Windsor	Hendrickson Drive	Princeton–Hightstown Road (CR 571) in West Windsor	
CR 608	0.77	1.24	Lawrence Station Road in Lawrence Township	Lawrence Station Road	Quakerbridge Road (CR 533) in Lawrence Township	
CR 609	0.68	1.09	Main Street in Hamilton	Church Street	South Broad Street (CR 524/CR 672) in Hamilton	
CR 611	3.55	5.71	Parkway Avenue (CR 634) in Ewing	Scotch Road	Washington Crossing–Pennington Road (CR 546) in Hopewell Township	
CR 612	2.45	3.94	Pennington–Hopewell Road (CR 654) in Hopewell Township	Marshalls Corner–Woodsville Road	Woodsville Road at the Hunterdon County line in Hopewell Township	
CR 613	1.28	2.06	US 206 southbound on the Ewing/Lawrence Township/Trenton tripoint border	Spruce Street	Ewingville Road (CR 636) and Parkside Avenue (CR 636) in Ewing	
CR 614	0.97	1.56	Trenton border in Hamilton	Nottingham Way	Greenwood Avenue (Route 33) and Nottingham Way (Route 33) in Hamilton	
CR 615	1.85	2.98	Princeton–Hightstown Road (Route 64/CR 571) in West Windsor	Cranbury Road	Cranbury Neck Road (CR 615) at the Middlesex County line in West Windsor	
CR 616	1.35	2.17	East State Street (CR 535) in Hamilton	Whitehead Road	Brunswick Pike (Business US 1) in Lawrence Township	
CR 618	2.81	4.52	Quakerbridge Road (CR 533), White Horse Avenue (CR 533), and Edinburg Road (CR 535) in Hamilton	Nottingham Way	Route 33 in Hamilton	
CR 619	1.75	2.82	Hamilton Avenue (CR 606) in Hamilton	Kuser Road	White Horse Avenue (CR 533) in Hamilton	
CR 620	2.13	3.43	Olden Avenue (CR 622) in Hamilton	Arena Drive	I-195 and South Broad Street (CR 524) in Hamilton	
CR 622	6.33	10.19	Parkway Avenue (CR 634) in Ewing	Olden Avenue	Arena Drive (CR 620) in Hamilton	
CR 623	2.87	4.62	Bear Tavern Road (CR 579) and Trenton–Harbourton Road (CR 579) in Hopewell Township	Pennington–Harbourton Road	Route 31 in Pennington	
CR 624	1.98	3.19	Eglantine Avenue in Pennington	East Delaware Avenue, Pennington–Rocky Hill Road	Titus Mill Road in Hopewell Township	
CR 625	2.21	3.56	Pennington–Rocky Hill Road (CR 624) in Hopewell Township	Elm Ridge Road	Carter Road (CR 569) in Hopewell Township	
CR 626	2.07	3.33	Assunpink Creek Bridge in Trenton	Chambers Street	South Broad Street (US 206) in Hamilton	
CR 627	1.25	2.01	Parkway Avenue (CR 634) on the Trenton/Ewing border	Prospect Street	Spruce Street (CR 613) in Ewing	
CR 629	1.13	1.82	US 1 in West Windsor	North Harrison Street	End of the county maintenance in Princeton	
CR 630	1.10	1.77	Old York Road (CR 539) in East Windsor	Windsor–Perrineville Road, Imlaystown Road	Imlaystown Road at the Monmouth County line in East Windsor	
CR 631	0.77	1.24	Washington Crossing–Pennington Road (CR 546) in Hopewell Township	Ingleside Avenue	South Main Street (CR 640) in Pennington	
CR 632	1.00	1.61	Pennington Road (CR 640) in Hopewell Township	Pennington–Lawerence Road, Blackwell Road	Benjamin Trail in Hopewell Township	
CR 633	1.00	1.61	North Main Street (CR 539) in Hightstown	Monmouth Street	Route 33 in East Windsor	
CR 634	4.93	7.93	West Upper Ferry Road (Route 175) in Ewing	West Upper Ferry Road, Parkway Avenue	Ingham Avenue on the Trenton/Ewing border	
CR 635	1.13	1.82	North Clinton Avenue and South Clinton Avenue in Trenton	East State Street	East State Street (CR 535), North Logan Avenue, and South Logan Avenue on the Trenton/Hamilton border	
CR 636	5.71	9.19	West State Street in Trenton	Parkside Avenue, Ewingville Road, Upper Ferry Road	Scotch Road (CR 611) in Ewing	
CR 637	2.60	4.18	River Road (Route 29) in Ewing	Jacobs Creek Road, Bear Tavern Road, Jacobs Creek Road	Washington Crossing–Pennington Road (CR 546) in Hopewell Township	
CR 638	5.03	8.10	US 1 in Lawrence Township	Grovers Mill Road, Clarksville Road	Cranbury Road (CR 615) in West Windsor	
CR 639	0.33	0.53	Olden Avenue (CR 622) in Ewing	Arctic Parkway	Spruce Street (CR 613) in Ewing	
CR 640	2.23	3.59	Pennington Road (Route 31), Washington Crossing–Pennington Road (CR 546), and Blackwell Road (CR 546) in Hopewell Township	Pennington Road, South Main Street, North Main Street	Route 31 in Hopewell Township	
CR 641	2.20	3.54	Old Trenton Road (CR 526/CR 535) and Edinburg Road (CR 526) in West Windsor	Windsor Road, Church Street	US 130 in Robbinsville	
CR 643	4.13	6.65	River Road (Route 29) in Ewing	Lower Ferry Road	Reed Road on the Ewing/Hopewell township line	
CR 644	0.81	1.30	Edinburg Road (CR 526) in West Windsor	New Village Road, Village Road East	Old Trenton Road (CR 535) in West Windsor	
CR 645	0.21	0.34	Princeton Avenue (US 206) in Lawrence Township	Brunswick Circle Extension	US 206 and Business US 1 at the Brunswick Circle in Lawrence Township	
CR 647	1.78	2.86	Bear Tavern Road (CR 579) in Ewing	Nursery Road	Scotch Road (CR 611) in Hopewell Township	
CR 648	0.62	1.00	Ewingville Road (CR 636) in Ewing	Whitehead Road Extension	Dead end in Ewing	
CR 649	3.29	5.29	Whitehead Road (CR 616) in Hamilton	Sweet Briar Avenue, Sloan Avenue, Flock Road	Edinburg Road (CR 535) in Hamilton	
CR 650	1.20	1.93	Lamberton Street in Trenton	Lalor Street	South Broad Street (US 206) in Hamilton	
CR 652	0.13	0.21	Nottingham Way (Route 33) in Hamilton	Nottingham Way	Nottingham Way (CR 535) in Hamilton	
CR 653	1.53	2.46	West State Street in Trenton	Calhoun Street	Princeton Avenue (US 206) in Trenton	
CR 654	3.05	4.91	Route 31 in Hopewell Township	Pennington–Hopewell Road	Louellen Street (CR 518) and West Broad Street (CR 518) in Hopewell	
CR 672	2.17	3.49	Church Street (CR 660) at the Burlington County line in Hamilton	Church Street, South Broad Street	South Broad Street (CR 524) and Yardville–Hamilton Square Road in Hamilton	
