= County Route 533 (New Jersey) =

County highway in New Jersey, U.S.

County Route 533
- Route of CR 533 in red, CR 533 Spur in blue

Route information
- Length: 32.7 mi (52.6 km)
- Tourist routes: Millstone Valley Scenic Byway

Major junctions
- South end: US 206 / CR 524 in Hamilton
- Route 33 in Hamilton; CR 535 in Hamilton; US 1 in West Windsor; CR 583 in Princeton; US 206 in Princeton; CR 514 in Millstone; CR 527 in Bound Brook
- North end: CR 607 on the Bound Brook–Middlesex line

Location
- Country: United States
- State: New Jersey
- Counties: Mercer, Somerset

Highway system
- County routes in New Jersey; 500-series routes
← CR 532	→ CR 534

County Route 533 (CR 533) is a county highway in the U.S. state of New Jersey. The highway extends 32.7 miles (52.6 km) from the White Horse Circle, in Hamilton to Lincoln Boulevard (CR 607) on the border of Bound Brook and Middlesex Borough. CR 533 shares a long concurrency with US 206 through Princeton and Montgomery, while portions of the roadway in Somerset County are part of the Millstone River Valley Scenic Byway.

It also has a key historic importance, as George Washington used the road during his march from Trenton to Princeton during the American Revolution. This is commemorated by several small stone pillars at various points along the road.

== Route description ==
=== White Horse to Princeton ===
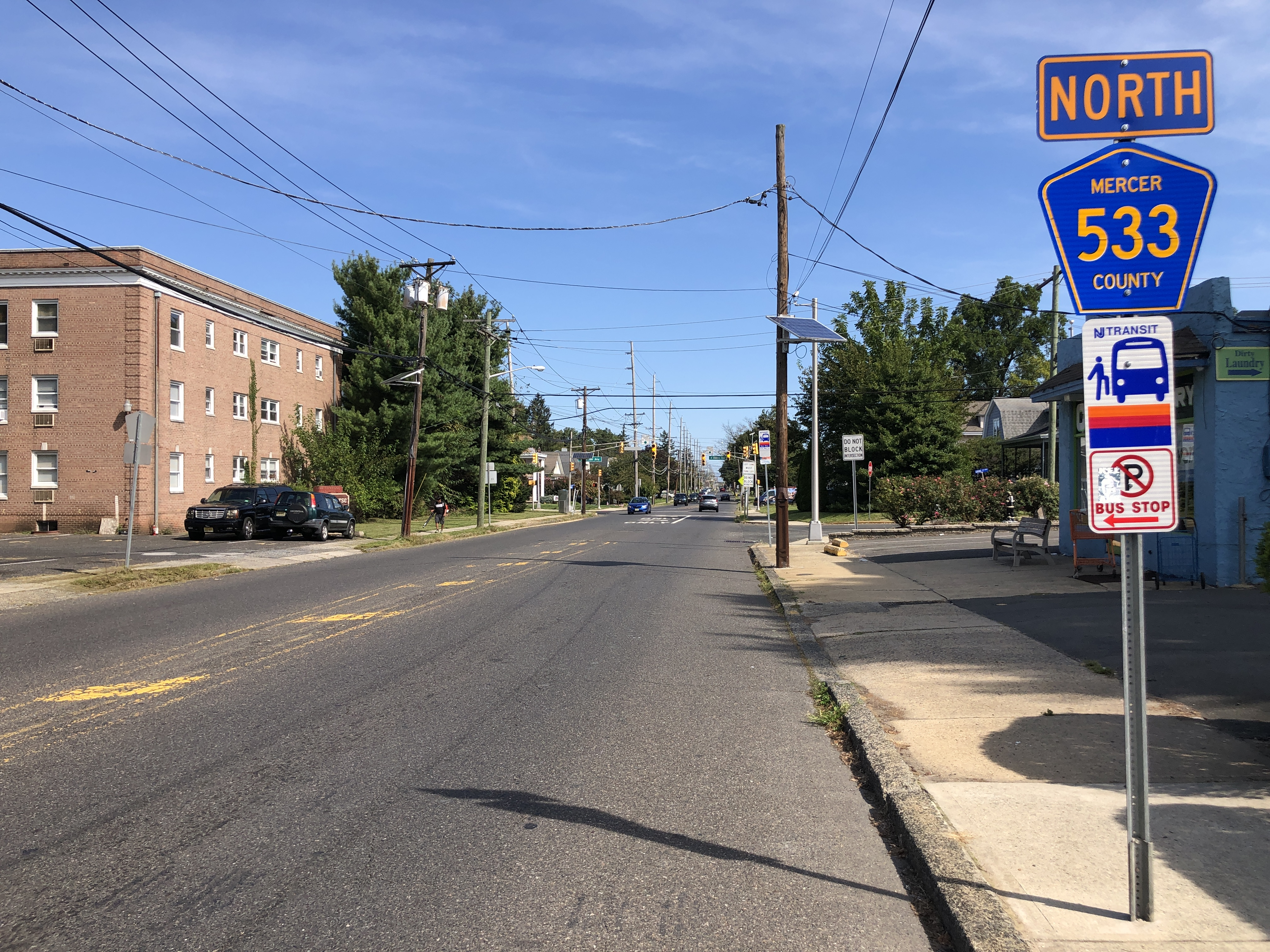
View north at the south end of CR 533 at US 206 and CR 524 in Hamilton Township

The southern third of CR 533 serves as a shorter, more direct route between two parts of US 206, connecting the southern portion as it travels north from Bordentown and the northern portion as moves through Princeton and into Somerset County. The U.S. highway turns west down Broad Street at the circle and winds confusingly through Trenton before moving through Lawrence, the county route continues nearly due north through Hamilton and along the Lawrence/West Windsor boundary into Princeton. CR 524 also begins at the circle, following South Broad Street in the other direction towards Yardville and Allentown. For its first three point five miles (5.6 km) in southern Hamilton, the route is White Horse Avenue and White Horse-Mercerville Road, as it connects the two census-designated places of White Horse and Mercerville. Along the way, it accesses both interchanges with I-295 (exit 61) and I-195 (exit 2) via Arena Drive (CR 620), just 0.4 miles (0.64 km) from the southern terminus. In Mercerville, it intersects with Route 33, providing access to Downtown Trenton and the business-laden stretch of Hamilton Square. Less than one mile (1.6 km) later, CR 533 meets the intersection of Edinburg Road/Nottingham Way (CR 535) and Nottingham Way (CR 618) at a five-point intersection, and continues north as Quakerbridge Road.

At this point, the route picks up the trail followed by Washington. It passes the intersection of Sloan Avenue (CR 649)/Flock Road, which again provides access to I-295 at exit 65 and widens to four lanes wide. From here, it continues on to the northern border of Hamilton and follows the border between Lawrence to the west and West Windsor on the east (the Keith line). It crosses Amtrak's Northeast Corridor and passes the Quaker Bridge Mall complex to the left as it approaches the interchange with US 1. After the cloverleaf interchange with US 1, the road name briefly changes to Province Line Road and intersects an access road to Mercer Mall. At the next traffic light, it intersects the access to the Nassau Park shopping center and Province Line Road, unsigned CR 569. North of this intersection, CR 533 becomes unsigned and is known as Quaker Road. After crossing the Delaware and Raritan Canal at Port Mercer, Quaker Road becomes under the jurisdiction of Princeton, turns off the Keith line into the borough, and crosses Stony Brook on Quaker Bridge. Paralleling Stony Brook and adjacent to farmland, CR 533 intersects with Princeton Pike, also known as CR 583, before winding its way through a small residential area, narrows such that it becomes traversable for northbound traffic only, and reaches its intersection of US 206.

=== Concurrency with US 206 ===
During its 6 1/2-mile-long (10.5 km) concurrency with Route 206, CR 533 passes Drumthwacket, Nassau Street (Route 27's southern terminus) in downtown Princeton and Princeton Airport near an intersection of Georgetown–Franklin Turnpike/Washington Street (CR 518) in Montgomery, just beyond the county line between Mercer and Somerset. Just before the end of the concurrency, the road passes over the Beden Brook. CR 533 is not signed anywhere along its concurrency with US 206.

=== Montgomery to Bound Brook ===
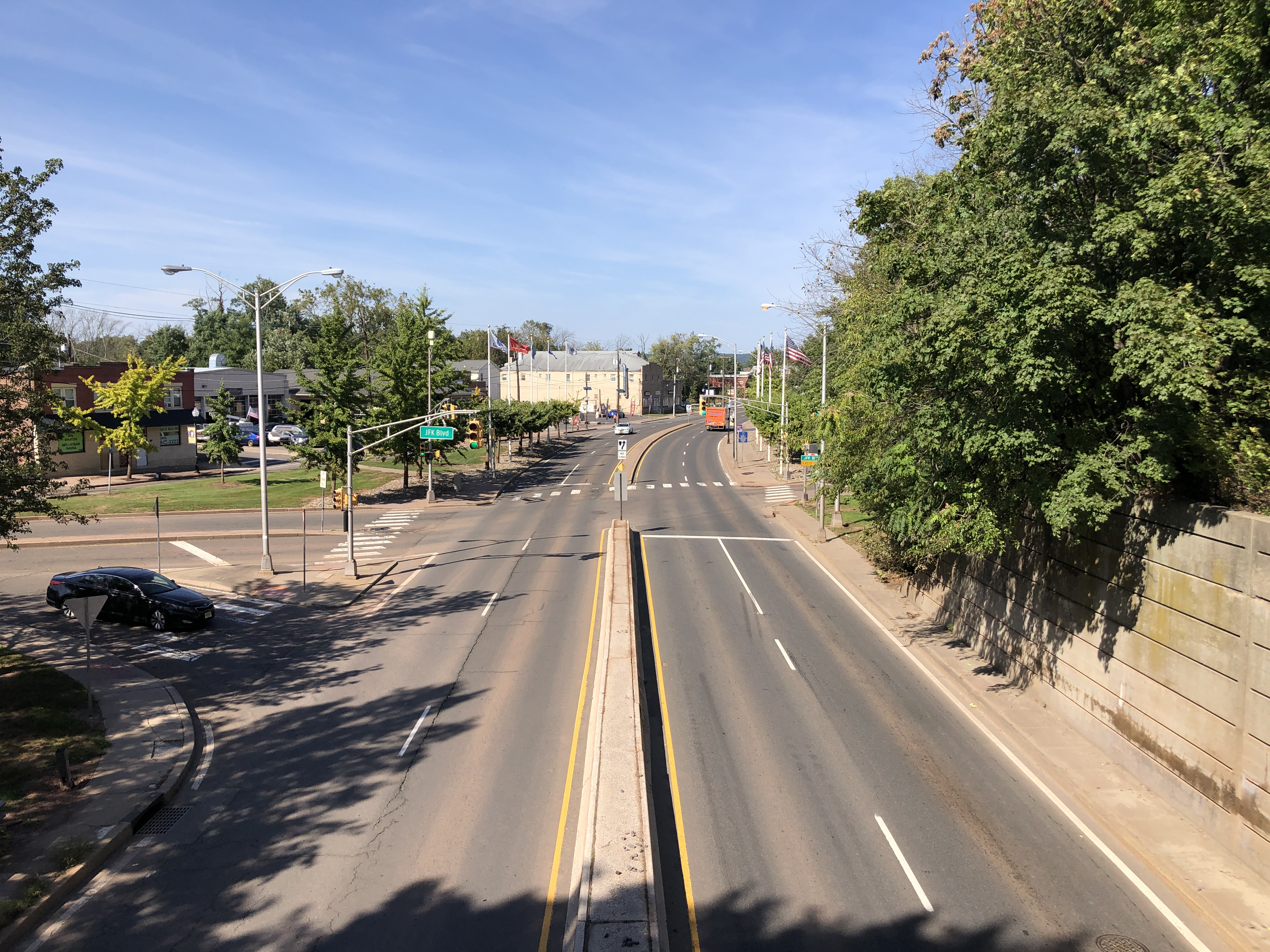
View northbound along CR 533 entering downtown Manville

CR 533 finally splits off of US 206 in northern Montgomery, breaking off to the right and running along the western bank of the Millstone River, which is itself parallel to the Delaware and Raritan Canal for this stretch. It is now known as River Road while the southbound direction becomes Orchard Road, and there is a Canal Road that also mirrors CR 533 on the far side of the two waterways in Franklin Township.

CR 533 meets the intersection of Township Line Road from the left, marking the move from Montgomery into Hillsborough. It later enters the borough of Millstone, becoming Main Street for about one mile (1.6 km). Here, it intersects with Amwell Road (CR 514), which provides access to a short bypass of the borough to the west. Upon reentering Hillsborough, CR 533 meets the northern terminus of the aforementioned bypass, signed as CR 533 Bypass.

CR 533 passes by the Central Jersey Regional Airport, then turns away from the river as it becomes South Main Street and North Main Street in the borough of Manville. After two miles (3.2 km), CR 533 crosses the Raritan River over Van Veghten's Bridge and enters Bridgewater, becoming Finderne Avenue. CR 533 reaches the CDP of Finderne, and turns right down East Main Street, traveling almost due east for its remaining two and a half miles (4.0 km). In its busy final mile, it passes by TD Bank Ballpark (home to the Somerset Patriots), the Bridgewater railroad station serving NJ Transit's Raritan Valley Line and I-287, enters Bound Brook, becoming Talmage Avenue. There is no direct access to I-287, but Promenade Boulevard (CR 685) does carry traffic to Route 28 at exit 13 off the freeway. Traveling through Bound Brook, CR 533 turns southeast on Columbus Place and reaches an intersection of Mountain Avenue (Route 527). CR 533 forms a concurrency with CR 527 through the downtown area. After a roundabout, CR 527 heads to the south on South Main Street and CR 689 heads to the north on Bolmer Boulevard while CR 533 continues east along East Main Street. On a bridge connecting Bound Brook and the Middlesex County borough of Middlesex, CR 533 ends while CR 607 continues east as Lincoln Boulevard.

== Major intersections ==
County	Location	mi	km	Destinations	Notes
Mercer	Hamilton Township	0.0	0.0	US 206 (South Broad Street) / CR 524 east to I-195 – Bordentown, Trenton, Yardville	White Horse Circle; southern terminus; western terminus of CR 524
Mercer	Hamilton Township	3.3	5.3	Route 33 – Trenton, Hightstown	
Mercer	Hamilton Township	3.5	5.6	CR 535 (Edinburg Road) / CR 618 (Nottingham Way) to I-295 north	
Mercer	West Windsor Township	8.0	12.9	US 1 – Trenton, New Brunswick	Interchange
Mercer	Lawrence–West Windsor township line	8.4	13.5	CR 569 north (Province Line Road)	Southern terminus of CR 569
Mercer	Princeton	10.4	16.7	CR 583 (Mercer Street)	
Mercer	Princeton	10.8	17.4	US 206 south	Southern end of US 206 concurrency
Mercer	Princeton	12.2	19.6	Route 27 north (Nassau Street) – Hightstown, New Brunswick	Southern terminus of Route 27
Somerset	Montgomery Township	16.41	26.41	CR 518 (Georgetown–Franklin Turnpike / Washington Street) – Blawenburg, Rocky Hill	
Somerset	Montgomery Township	17.3– 17.4	27.8– 28.0	US 206 north – Somerville	Northern end of US 206 concurrency
Somerset	Millstone	25.5	41.0	CR 514 (Amwell Road)	
Somerset	Hillsborough Township	25.9	41.7	CR 533 Spur south to CR 514	Northern terminus of CR 533 Spur
Somerset	Bound Brook	32.3	52.0	CR 527 north (Mountain Avenue)	Southern end of CR 527 concurrency
Somerset	Bound Brook	32.6	52.5	CR 527 south (South Main Street) / CR 689 north (Bolmer Boulevard)	Roundabout; northern end of CR 527 concurrency; southern terminus of CR 689
Somerset–Middlesex county line	Bound Brook–Middlesex borough line	32.7	52.6	CR 607 east (Lincoln Boulevard)	Northern terminus; western terminus of CR 607
1.000 mi = 1.609 km; 1.000 km = 0.621 mi: Concurrency terminus

== CR 533 Spur ==
County Route 533 Spur
- Location: Millstone–Hillsborough
- Length: 0.4 mi (640 m)

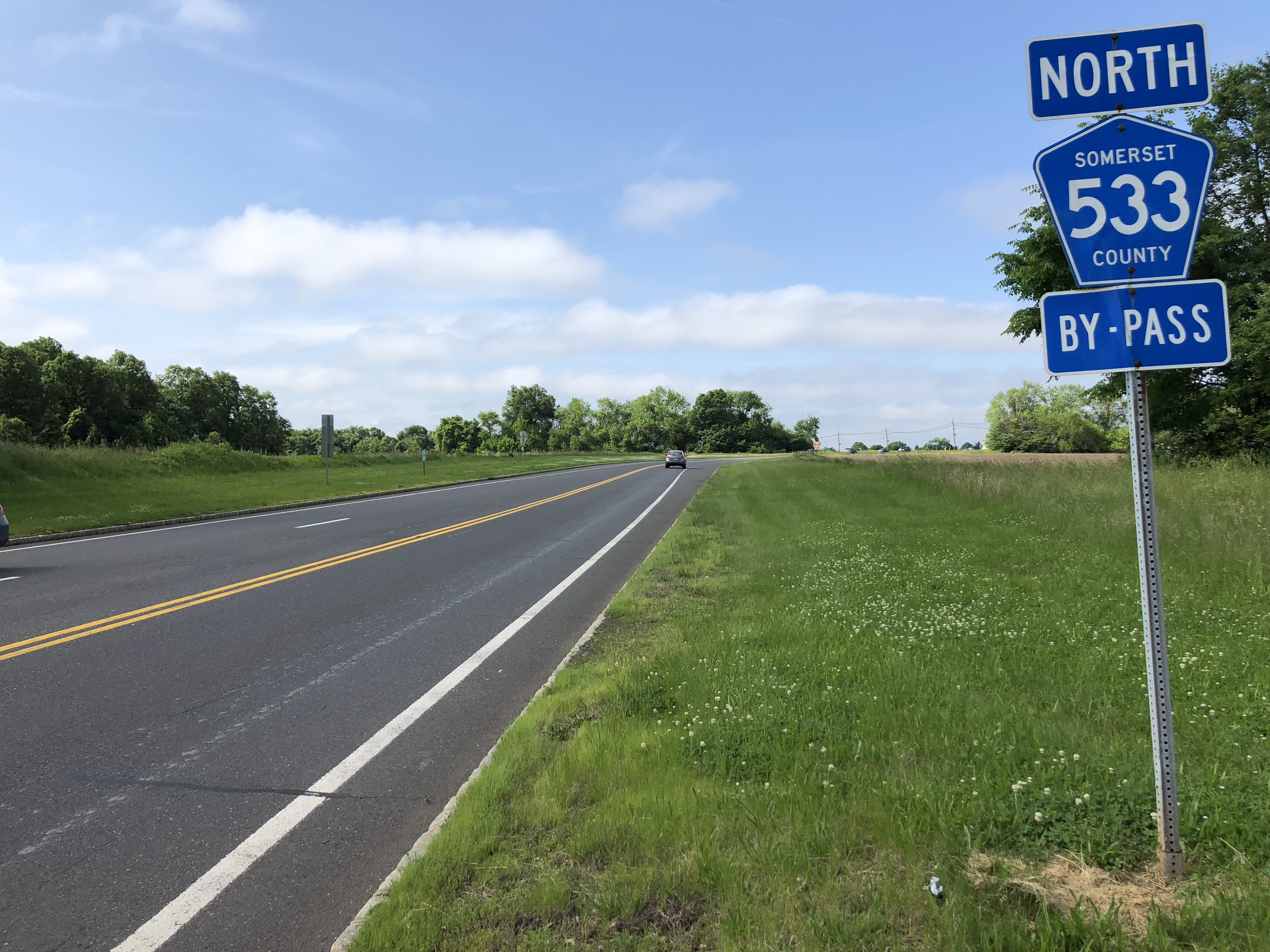
Looking north along Somerset Courthouse Road signed as CR 533 Bypass

County Route 533 Spur (signed as County Route 533 Bypass) is a county highway in the U.S. state of New Jersey. The highway extends 0.4 miles (0.64 km) from Millstone Bypass (CR 514) in Millstone to River Road (CR 533) in Hillsborough. It is known as Somerset Courthouse Road. There is only one other intersection along the road besides its two endpoints, Hamilton Road just feet north of the Millstone–Hillsborough border.
