= List of highways numbered 569 =

The following highways are numbered 569:

== Ireland ==
- R569 road (Ireland)

== South Africa ==
- R569 (South Africa)

== United States ==
- I-569 (former proposal)
- SR 569
- LA 569
- MD 569 (former)
- MS 569
- County Route 569 (New Jersey)
- OR 569
- PR-569
- FM 569

Preceded by 568	Lists of highways 569	Succeeded by 570
