= County Route 518 (New Jersey) =

County highway in New Jersey, U.S.

County Route 518
- CR 518 highlighted in red

Route information
- Length: 20.58 mi (33.12 km)
- Existed: January 1, 1953–present
- Tourist routes: Millstone Valley Scenic Byway

Major junctions
- West end: Route 29 / Route 165 in Lambertville
- Route 31 in Hopewell Township; CR 569 in Hopewell Borough; US 206 in Montgomery Township
- East end: Route 27 in Franklin Township

Location
- Country: United States
- State: New Jersey
- Counties: Hunterdon, Mercer, Somerset

Highway system
- County routes in New Jersey; 500-series routes
| ← CR 517 | → CR 519 |

County Route 518 (CR 518) is a county highway in the U.S. state of New Jersey. The highway extends 20.58 miles (33.12 km) from Route 29/Route 165 in Lambertville to Lincoln Highway (Route 27) in Franklin Township. It is also known as the Georgetown Franklin Turnpike.

== Route description ==
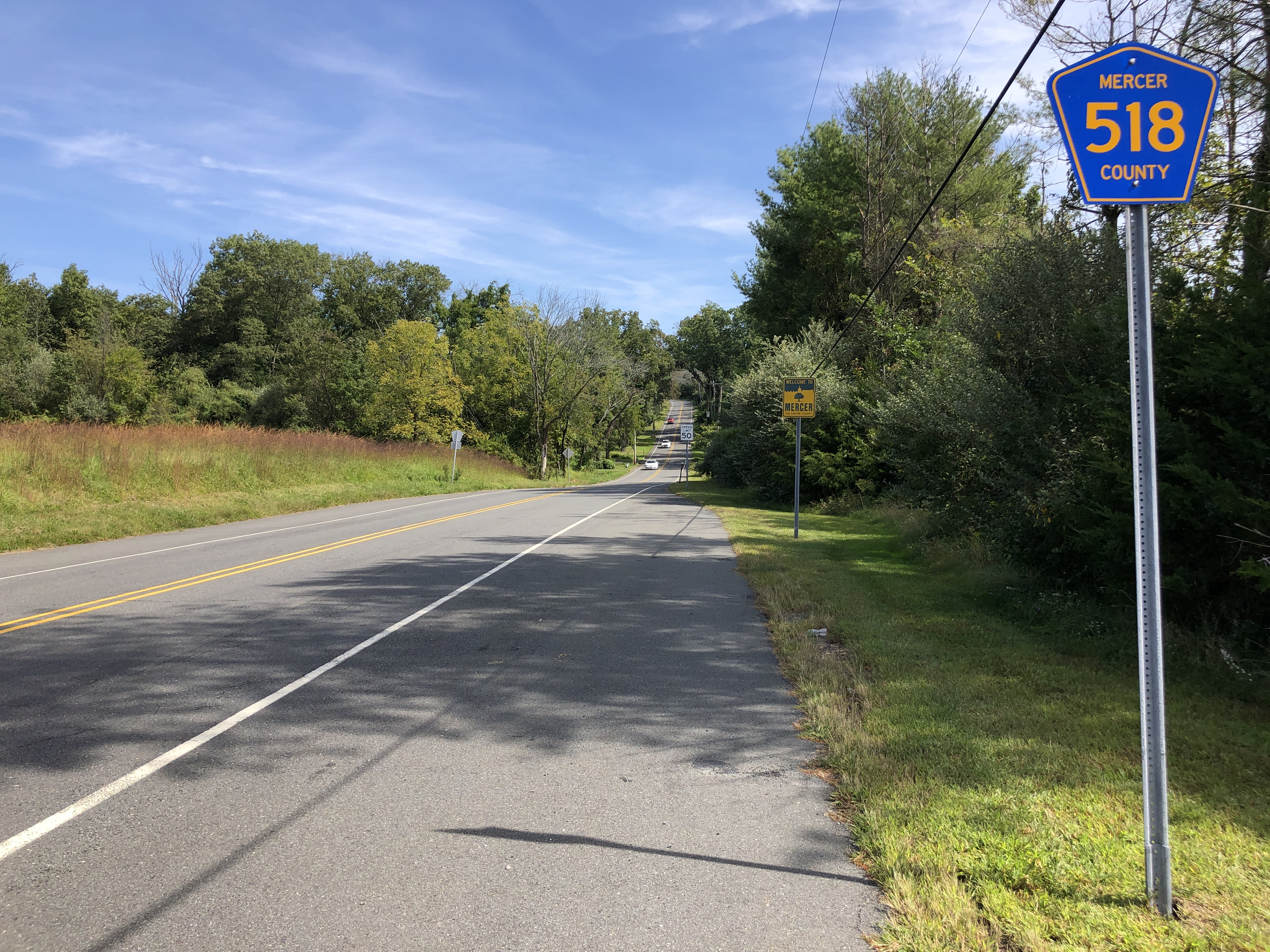
Typical section of CR 518 in Hopewell Township, Mercer County

CR 518 begins at an intersection with Route 29/Route 165 in Lambertville, Hunterdon County, heading east on two-lane undivided Brunswick Avenue. The road climbs in elevation heading east through wooded residential areas before turning southeast and crossing into West Amwell Township and becoming Brunswick Pike. The route winds east through forested areas with some homes before entering a mix of farmland, woods, and residences. CR 518 turns northeast and enters Hopewell Township in Mercer County and immediately intersects CR 601 before coming to the CR 579 junction. At this intersection, the road becomes Lambertville-Hopewell Road and continues east, intersecting CR 612 in Woodsville and Route 31.

At the intersection with the latter, CR 518 runs east along the border between East Amwell Township, Hunterdon County to the north and Hopwell Township, Mercer County to the south, passing through wooded areas as it crosses fully into Hopewell Township again. CR 518 ascends and descends a spur of the Sourland Mountains before continuing into Hopewell Borough, where it becomes Louellen Street and crosses CSX's Trenton Subdivision before heading into residential areas. At the intersection with CR 654, the route turns east onto Broad Street and passes homes and businesses, intersecting the northern terminus of CR 569 (Princeton Avenue). The road leaves Hopewell Borough for Hopewell Township again, heading northeast into agricultural areas.

At Stoutsburg, CR 518 crosses the Keith line and continues into Montgomery Township, Somerset County, passing farms, woods, and residential subdivisions. The road crosses CR 601, at which point it turns to the east and continues to an intersection with US 206/CR 533 a short distance north of Princeton Airport in a commercial area. East of US 206/CR 533, the route enters Rocky Hill, where the name becomes Washington Street, and passes wooded residential areas, intersecting CR 605 in the center of the community. From this point, CR 518 enters woodland and crosses the Millstone River, where it enters Franklin Township and becomes Georgetown-Franklin Turnpike. Immediately following the Millstone River, the road crosses the Delaware and Raritan Canal and reaches the CR 603 intersection. The route ascends Ten Mile Run Mountain and passes through more forests to the north of a quarry, climbing a steep hill, and curves to the northeast, flattening out into a mix of farms, woods, and homes. CR 518 reaches its eastern terminus at an intersection with Route 27 (though which the border between Franklin Township, Somerset County and South Brunswick, Middlesex County runs).

== History ==
The entirety of this road was created as part of the Georgetown and Franklin Turnpike, incorporated in 1816 to run from New Brunswick to the Delaware River at Lambertville. Also included in this turnpike is what is now Route 27 to New Brunswick.

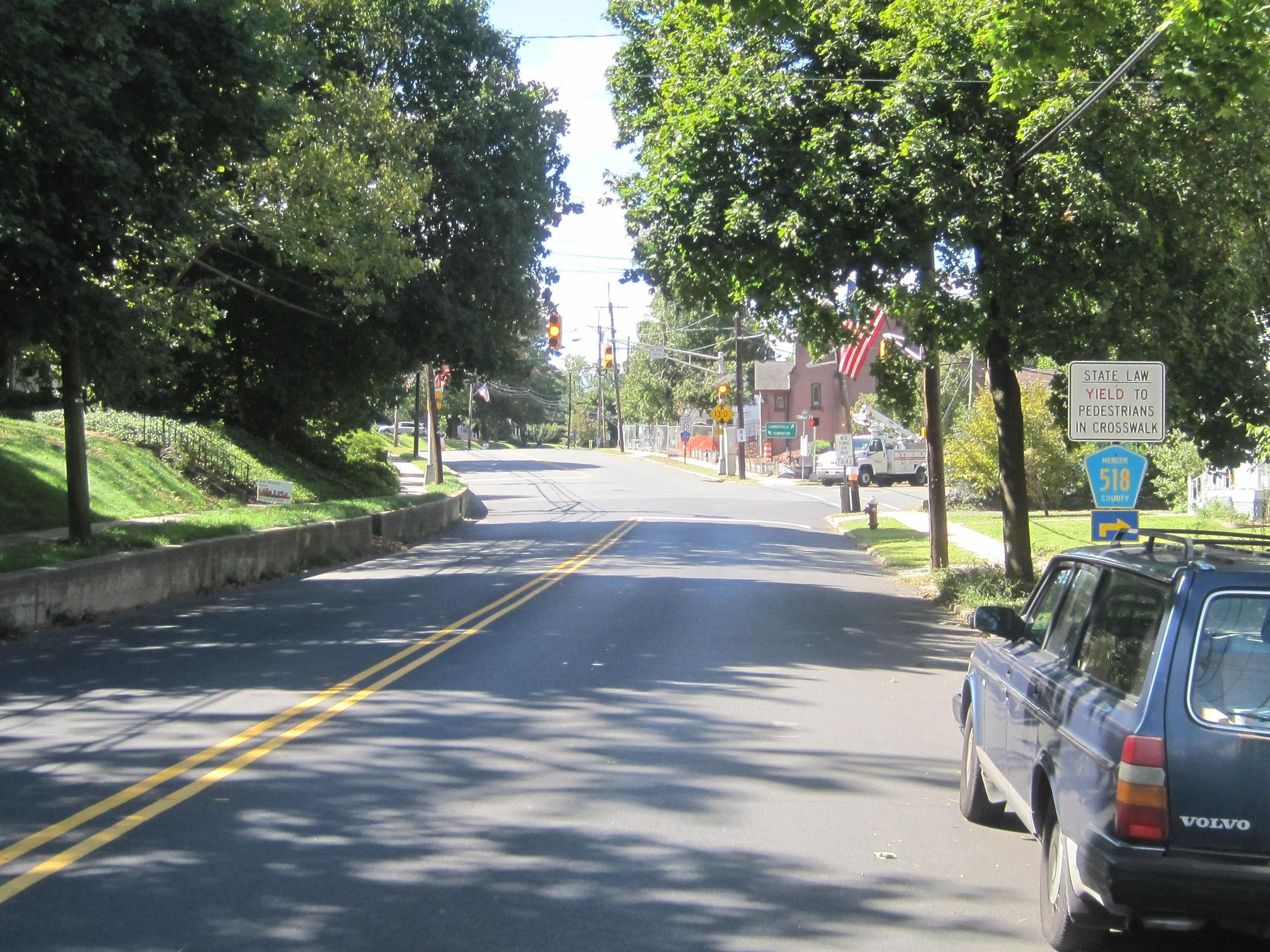
Westbound CR 518 in Hopewell. CR 654 (former CR 518 Spur) southbound begins ahead while CR 518 turns right.

A spur route, County Route 518 Spur, existed, which is now Mercer County Route 654.

Beginning in 2014, Somerset County began reconstruction of a steep, winding section of CR 518 in Franklin Township to reduce the potential for accidents and improve the quality of the road in the area. The $4.6-million project involves blasting into a hillside to allow for a realigned section of roadway and the addition of storm sewers and shoulders. Final completion of the project occurred in August 2015.

== Major intersections ==
| County | Location | mi | km | Destinations | Notes |
|---|---|---|---|---|---|
| Hunterdon | Lambertville | 0.00 | 0.00 | Route 29 / Route 165 (Franklin Street) | |
| Mercer | Hopewell Township | 5.48 | 8.82 | CR 579 (Harbourton–Rocktown Road) | |
| Mercer | Hopewell Township | 7.21 | 11.60 | Route 31 – Flemington, Trenton | |
| Mercer | Hopewell | 10.51 | 16.91 | CR 569 south (Princeton Avenue) | Northern terminus of CR 569 |
| Somerset | Montgomery Township | 16.64 | 26.78 | US 206 (CR 533) – Somerville, Princeton | |
| Somerset | Franklin Township | 20.58 | 33.12 | Route 27 – New Brunswick, Princeton | |
1.000 mi = 1.609 km; 1.000 km = 0.621 mi
