= List of highways numbered 572 =

The following highways are numbered 572:

== United Kingdom ==
- A572 road

== United States ==
- SR 572
- LA 572
- MD 572 (former)
- MS 572
- PA 572
- PR-572
- FM 572

Preceded by 571	Lists of highways 572	Succeeded by 573
