= List of highways numbered 573 =

The following highways are numbered 573:

== United States ==
- SR 573
- LA 573
- MD 573 (former)
- SR 573
- County Route 573 (New Jersey)
- PR-573
- FM 573

Preceded by 572	Lists of highways 573	Succeeded by 574
