= List of highways numbered 571 =

The following highways are numbered 571:

== Canada ==
- Highway 571

== Cuba ==
- Jarahueca–El Mamey Road (4-571)

== Ireland ==
- R571 road (Ireland)

== United Kingdom ==
- A571 road (Great Britain)
- B571 road

== United States ==
- LA 571
- MD 571 (former)
- MS 571
- Route 571
- County Route 571 (New Jersey)
- PR-571
- FM 571

Preceded by 570	Lists of highways 571	Succeeded by 572
