= List of highways numbered 574 =

Route 574, or Highway 574, may refer to:

== Canada ==
- Alberta Highway 574
- Ontario Highway 574
- Township Road 574 (Saskatchewan)

== Israel ==
- Israel road 574

== Malaysia ==
- K574 Jalan Kampung Kuala

== United Kingdom ==
- A574 road

== United States ==
- Florida State Road 574
  - County Road 574 (Hernando County, Florida)
  - County Road 574 (Hillsborough County, Florida)
- Kentucky Route 574
- Louisiana Highway 574
  - Louisiana Highway 574-1
  - Louisiana Highway 574-3
  - Louisiana Highway 574-4
  - Louisiana Highway 574-5
  - Louisiana Highway 574-6
  - Louisiana Highway 574-7
  - Louisiana Highway 574-8
  - Louisiana Highway 574-9
  - Louisiana Highway 574-10
  - Louisiana Highway 574-11
  - Louisiana Highway 574-12
- Nevada State Route 574
- New Mexico State Road 574
- County Route 574 (Erie County, New York)
- Ohio State Route 574
- Puerto Rico Highway 574
- South Carolina Highway 574 (former)
- Farm to Market Road 574
- Texas State Highway Loop 574

Preceded by 573	Lists of highways 574	Succeeded by 575
