= U.S. Route 206 =

US Numbered Highway in New Jersey and Pennsylvania

U.S. Route 206
- US 206 highlighted in red, US 206 Byp. in blue

Route information
- Auxiliary route of US 6
- Maintained by NJDOT, Township of Hamilton, City of Trenton, Mercer County, and DRJTBC
- Length: 130.23 mi (209.58 km)
- Existed: 1934–present
- Tourist routes: Millstone Valley Scenic Byway
- NHS: Entire route

Major junctions
- South end: US 30 / Route 54 in Hammonton, NJ
- Route 70 in Southampton, NJ; I-95 Toll / N.J. Turnpike in Bordentown Township, NJ; US 130 in Bordentown Township, NJ; I-195 in Hamilton Township, NJ; I-295 in Lawrence Township, NJ; US 202 / Route 28 at the Raritan–Bridgewater Township, NJ line; US 22 in Bridgewater Township, NJ; I-287 in Bridgewater Township, NJ; I-80 / Route 183 in Roxbury Township, NJ; Route 15 in Frankford Township, NJ
- North end: US 209 in Dingman Township, PA

Location
- Country: United States
- States: New Jersey, Pennsylvania
- Counties: NJ: Atlantic, Burlington, Mercer, Somerset, Morris, Sussex; PA: Pike

Highway system
- United States Numbered Highway System; List; Special; Divided
← US 202	NJ	→ Route 208
← PA 205	PA	→ PA 208

U.S. Route 206 (US 206) is a 130.23-mile-long (209.58 km) north–south United States Numbered Highway primarily in the state of New Jersey. (Note: The northernmost half mile (800 m) of its length is in Pennsylvania; the Milford–Montague Toll Bridge carries it over the Delaware River into New Jersey, where it is for the remainder of the route.) Its southern terminus is at an intersection with US 30 and Route 54 in Hammonton, while its northern terminus is at an intersection with US 209 near Milford, Pennsylvania. (Note: Some sources and signs show an overlap with US 209 to end at its parent route US 6, about one mile to the north.) For much of its length, US 206 is a rural two-lane undivided road that passes through the Pine Barrens, agricultural areas, and the Appalachian Mountains of northwestern New Jersey, with some urban and suburban areas. The route connects several cities and towns, including Bordentown, Trenton, Princeton, Somerville, Roxbury, Netcong, and Newton. The road is known as the Disabled American Veterans Highway for much of its length.

What is now US 206 in New Jersey was designated as part of several state routes prior to 1927, including pre-1927 Route 2 between Bordentown and Trenton in 1916, pre-1927 Route 13 between Trenton and Princeton in 1917, and pre-1927 Route 16 between Princeton and Bedminster Township in 1921. The current routing along pre-1927 Route 2 became a part of US 130 in 1926. In 1927, current US 206 became Route 39 between Hammonton and White Horse, Route 37 between White Horse and Trenton, Route 27 between Trenton and Princeton, Route 31 between Princeton and Newton, and Route S31 between Newton and the Delaware River. In the later 1930s, US 206 was designated to connect US 30 in Hammonton north to US 6 and US 209 in Milford; the northern terminus was moved to its current location in the 1940s. The state highways running concurrently with US 206 in New Jersey were removed in 1953. In the 1960s, two separate freeways were proposed for US 206 but never built. The first freeway was to connect Hammonton south along the Route 54 corridor toward Route 55 and the planned Route 60 in Vineland and Millville. The other US 206 freeway was planned in northwestern New Jersey, connecting Interstate 80 (I-80) in Netcong north to Montague Township. Construction began for a bypass of US 206 around Hillsborough Township in 2010 and was completed in 2021. The New Jersey Department of Transportation (NJDOT) widened the route in Byram Township to alleviate congestion, with completion in 2013.

== Route description ==
Lengths
	mi	km
NJ	129.77	208.84
PA	0.46	0.74
Total	130.23	209.58

The entire length of US 206 is part of the National Highway System.

=== New Jersey ===
==== Atlantic and Burlington counties ====
US 206 begins at US 30 in the town of Hammonton, Atlantic County, heading north-northeast on the two-lane, undivided Disabled American Veterans Highway. South of this intersection, the road continues as Route 54. From its southern terminus, US 206 runs through farmland, which eventually gives way to the heavily forested Pine Barrens. Within this area, the route continues through the Wharton State Forest. Here, the road comes to the eastern terminus of County Route 536 (CR 536).

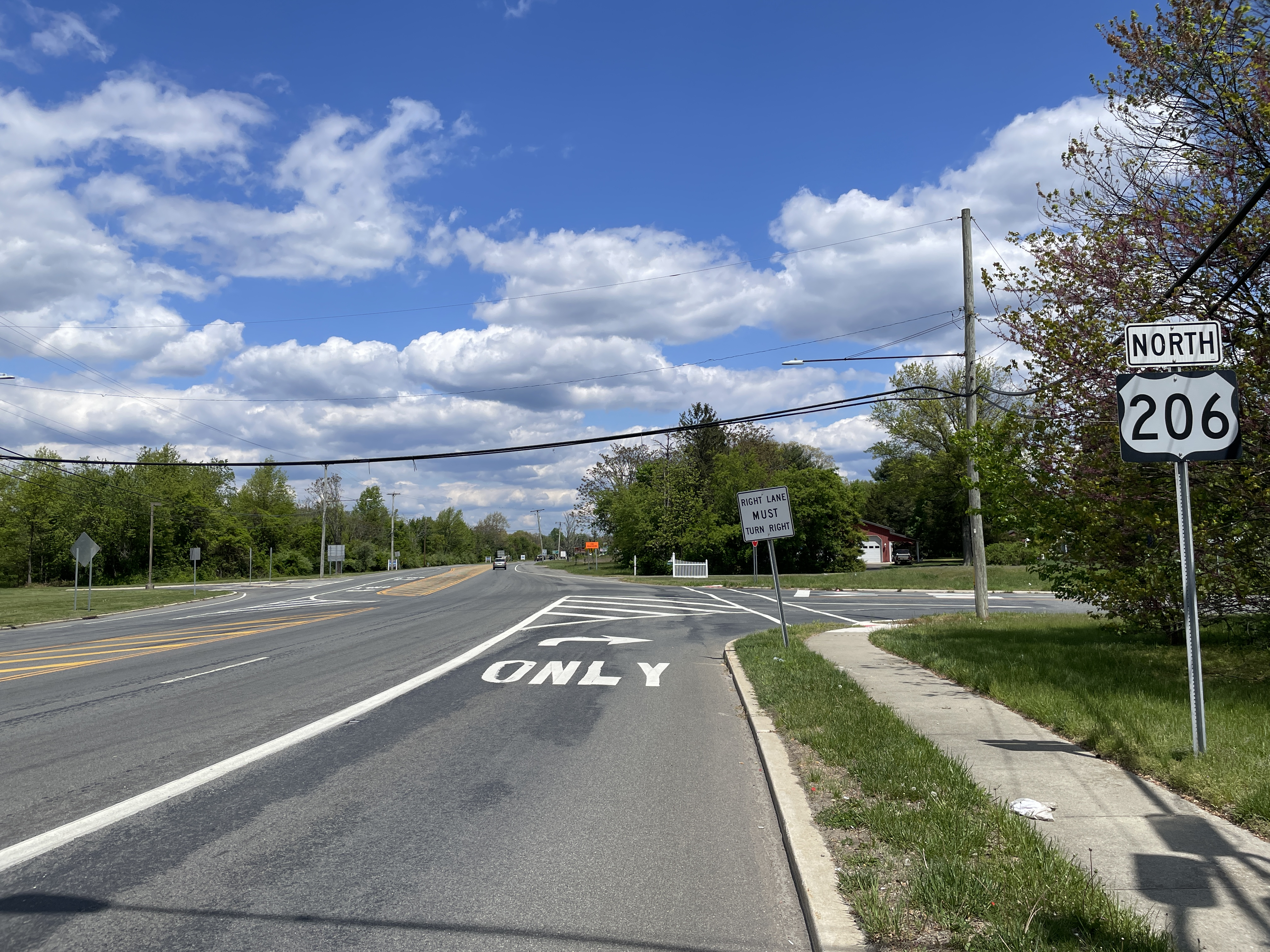
US 206 northbound past southern terminus at US 30 and Route 54 in Hammonton

US 206 continues into Shamong Township, Burlington County, passing through more of the Pine Barrens. In Shamong Township, the road makes a turn to the north and crosses an abandoned railroad line before it passes by Atsion Lake. After running northwest, CR 541 splits to the left. After this intersection, US 206 heads north out of Wharton State Forest and into more agricultural areas. At the intersection with CR 648, the route briefly widens into a four-lane undivided road before narrowing back to two lanes. Upon intersecting CR 622, US 206 enters Tabernacle Township. Here, CR 532 crosses the route at a signalized intersection. Following CR 532, residential development increases along the route as it continues into Southampton Township. US 206 becomes a three-lane road with one northbound lane and two southbound lanes as it comes to the Red Lion Circle with Route 70. Past the Red Lion Circle, the route becomes two lanes again and passes more rural surroundings with some development. US 206 comes to a junction with the eastern terminus of Route 38 and the western terminus of CR 530.

A short distance after the Route 38/CR 530 intersection, the route becomes the border between Eastampton Township to the west and Southampton Township to the east before running between Eastampton Township and Pemberton Township. Along this portion, it passes through Ewansville. Continuing entirely into Springfield Township, the route crosses CR 537. Past this intersection, US 206 widens into a four-lane undivided road. The route briefly gains a wide painted median before crossing the Assicunk Creek into Mansfield Township In Mansfield Township, US 206 becomes a divided highway as it bypasses the community of Columbus to the west, and CR 690 continues through Columbus. On the bypass of Columbus, the route has an interchange with CR 543.

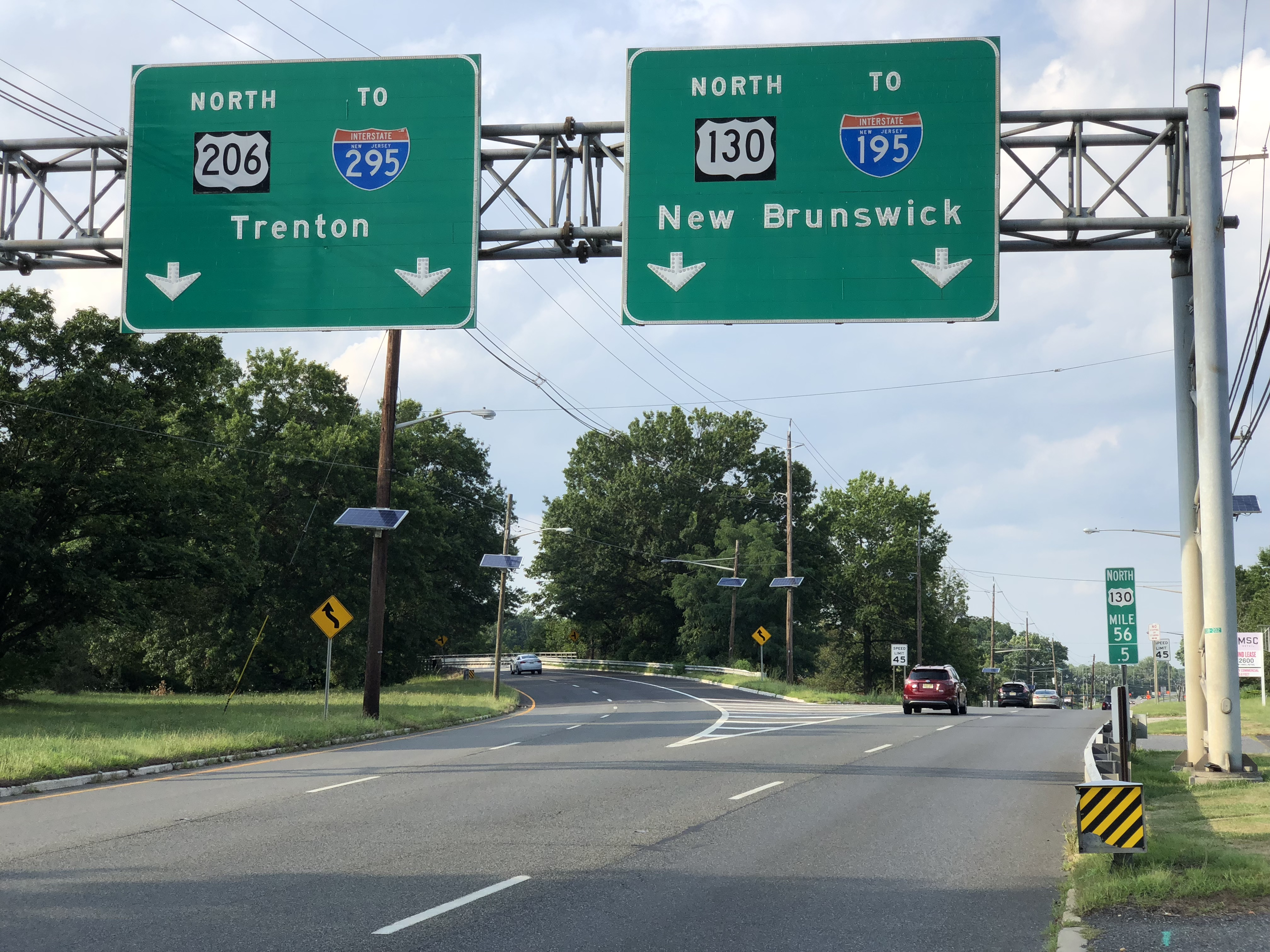
US 206/US 130 northbound split in Bordentown Township

Past Columbus, US 206 becomes undivided again, with residential development increasing. It becomes a divided highway again and merges with Route 68, the main access road to the Fort Dix section of Joint Base McGuire-Dix-Lakehurst, at a directional intersection. After this intersection, US 206 enters Bordentown Township and reaches an interchange with the New Jersey Turnpike (I-95) in a commercial area. Following this interchange, the route intersects CR 545. A short distance later, US 206 merges into US 130 at a directional interchange to form a concurrency (road). The two roads continue north on a six-lane divided highway, briefly entering the eastern edge of Bordentown at the intersection with CR 528. Back in Bordentown Township, US 130 and US 206 split at another directional interchange. Past US 130, US 206 crosses under Conrail Shared Assets Operations' Robbinsville Industrial Track railroad line and heads through development as a four-lane divided highway, making a slight northwest bend before resuming north.

==== Mercer County ====
US 206 crosses the Crosswicks Creek and enters Hamilton Township, Mercer County. Immediately after the Crosswicks Creek, there is an interchange with I-195. Past I-195, the route reaches the White Horse Circle, where it intersects CR 524 and CR 533. At this point, US 206 turns west-northwest to run along four-lane divided locally maintained Broad Street. Passing through White Horse, the road briefly becomes five lanes with a center left-turn lane before becoming a four-lane divided highway again as it crosses over I-295 without an interchange. Running into more urban areas of development, the route enters Trenton at the crossing of CR 650 After entering Trenton, US 206 narrows into a two-lane undivided street. As the road heads toward downtown Trenton, it crosses NJ Transit's River Line immediately before interchanging with Route 129. From here, the road turns more to the northwest with four lanes and passes by the CURE Insurance Arena before crossing over Amtrak's Northeast Corridor railroad line and the US 1 freeway without an interchange simultaneously. US 206 enters the commercial downtown area, narrowing back to two lanes before reaching Warren Street, where US 206 splits into a one-way pair following Broad Street northbound and Warren Street southbound.

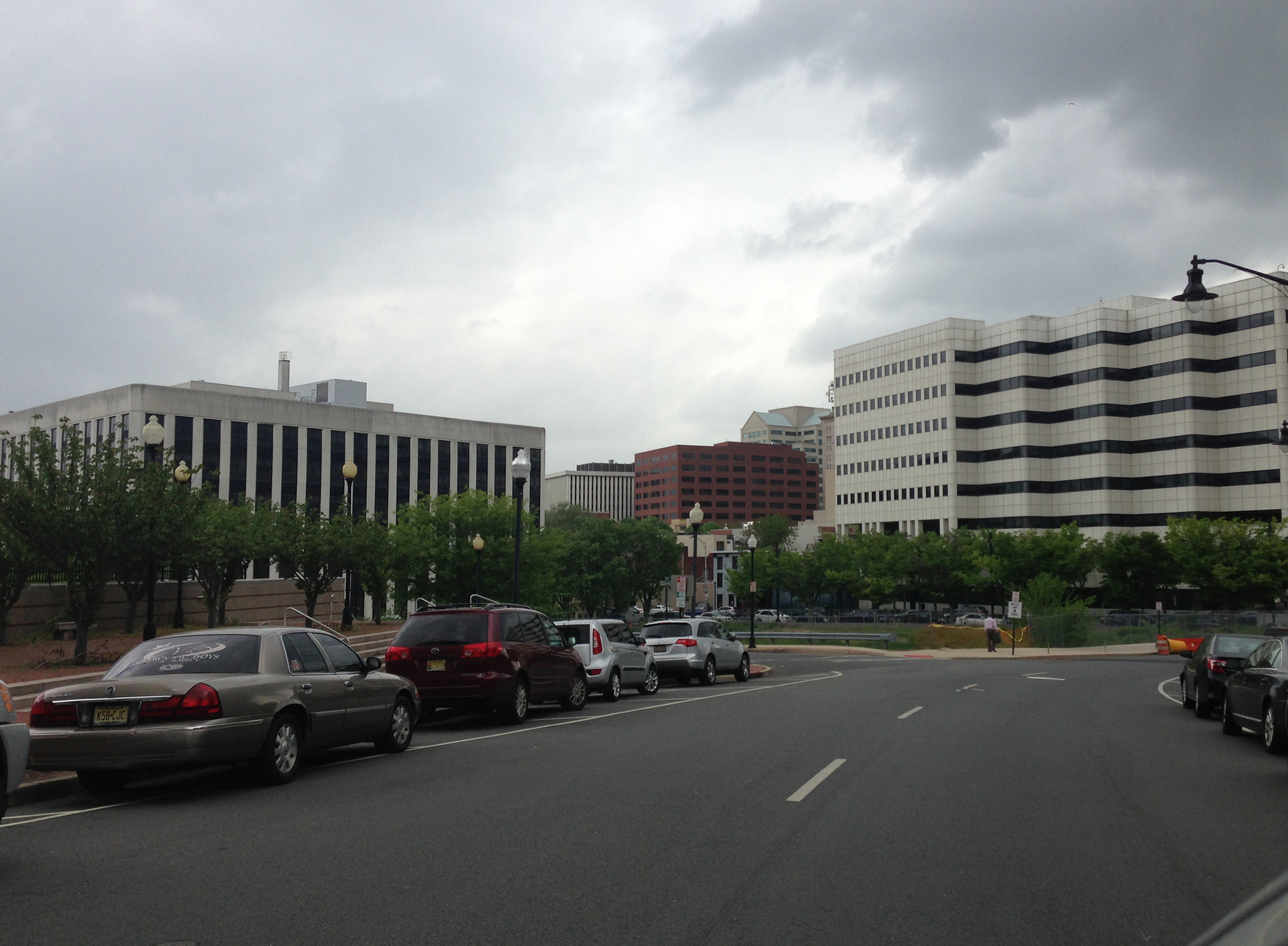
US 206 northbound following Broad Street through downtown Trenton

This one–way pairing, which carries two lanes in each direction, curves north and continues through downtown Trenton. (Note: The southbound segment of this pair is internally designated U.S. 206Z by NJDOT.) At the Trenton Battle Monument, the road reaches an intersection with the southern terminus of Route 31 and US 206 turns northeast onto another one-way pairing that follows Brunswick Avenue northbound and Martin Luther King Jr. Boulevard southbound; each road is two-way but only carryies one direction of US 206. The road continues through neighborhoods, with northbound US 206 passing to the west of Capital Health Regional Medical Center and southbound US 206 forming the border between Ewing Township to the northwest and Trenton to the southeast as a county-maintained road at the Calhoun Street intersection. At this point, southbound US 206 runs concurrently with CR 583. At the junction with Spruce Street, northbound US 206 becomes the border between Lawrence Township and Trenton, becoming state-maintained, while southbound US 206/CR 583 fully crosses into Lawrence Township. Northbound US 206 widens into a four-lane divided highway as it comes to the Brunswick Circle with US 1 Business. At this point, US 1 Business continues northeast on Brunswick Pike while northbound US 206 heads north as a two-lane undivided road called Lawrence Road. CR 645 links the Brunswick Circle to southbound US 206/CR 583.

At this point, both directions of US 206 are in Lawrence Township and rejoin; US 206 continues north as a two-lane undivided road, and CR 583 heads to the northeast. US 206 continues through suburban residential areas within Lawrence Township. The route makes a turn to the northeast before heading north again and passing to the east of Rider University. A short distance later, the road has a cloverleaf interchange with I-295 prior to an intersection with CR 546. In this area, US 206 is briefly a two-lane divided highway. Past CR 546, the route becomes two-lane undivided Main Street and heads north-northeast through Lawrenceville, passing development and the mile-long campus of The Lawrenceville School. Upon leaving Lawrenceville, US 206 turns more to the east through rural surroundings, forming a short concurrency with CR 569. From this point, the route continues northeast and enters Princeton.

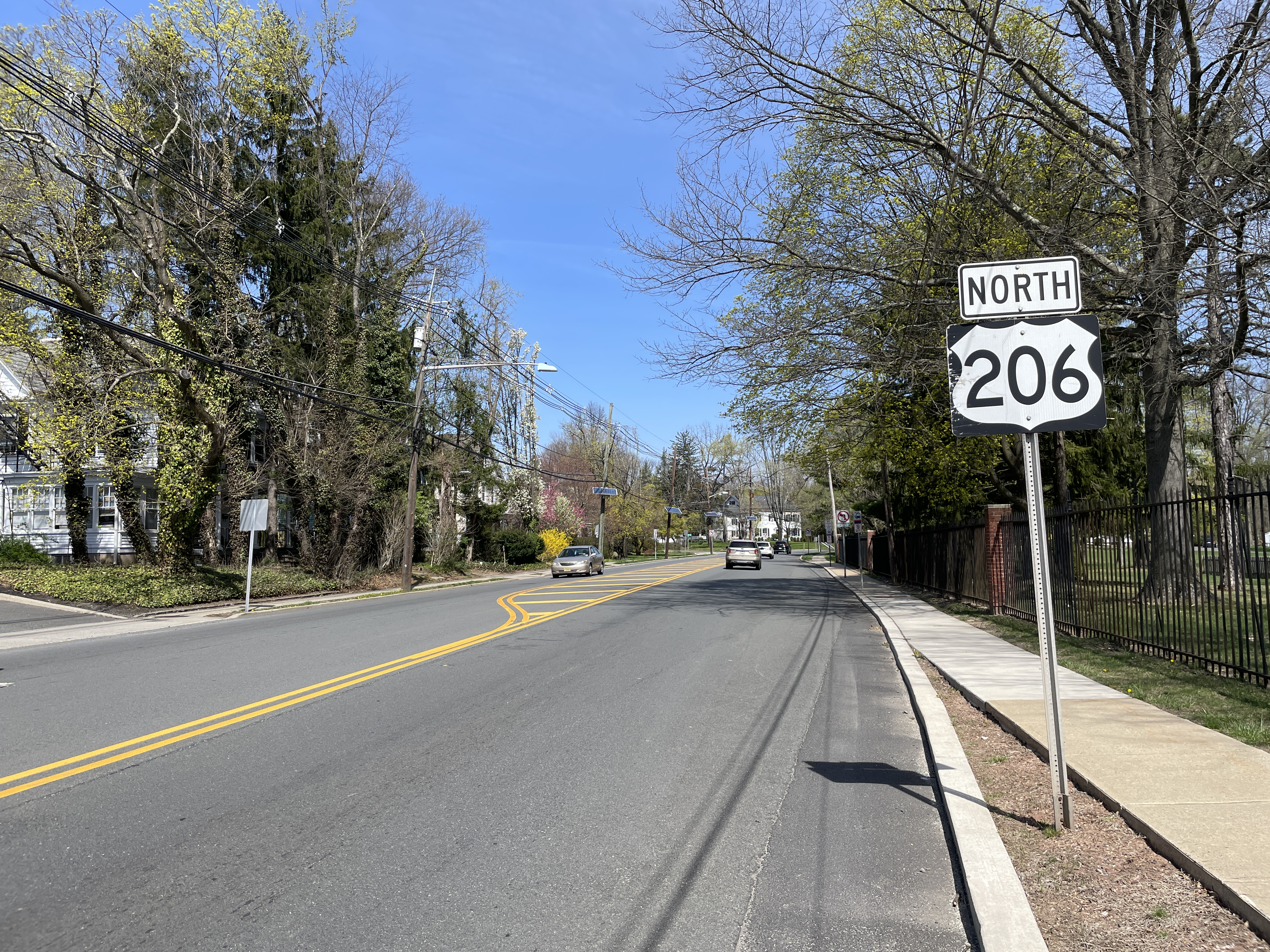
US 206 northbound past CR 546 in Lawrence Township

In Princeton, CR 533 intersects US 206, and the two routes run concurrently. The road becomes Stockton Street, passing by the Drumthwacket governor's mansion. US 206 turns north onto Bayard Lane, with Route 27 continuing northeast into downtown Princeton on Nassau Street, which provides access to Princeton University through Princeton Downtown. The stretch from Lawrenceville until the intersection with Nassau Street in Princeton is part of the King's Highway Historic District. Bayard Lane carries the route past more wooded developed areas, eventually curving northeast through a park. Here, US 206 becomes State Road and turns north again. Continuing to the north, the amount of development adjacent to the road decreases.

==== Somerset County ====
US 206 enters Montgomery Township, Somerset County, where the name of the road becomes Van Horne Memorial Highway. In Montgomery Township, the route runs to the east of Princeton Airport and crosses CR 518. Following this intersection, CR 533 splits from US 206 by heading northeast, and US 206 continues north-northwest through a mix of suburban and rural areas. The road passes through the community of Harlingen before widening to four lanes and reaching Belle Mead. In this area, US 206 passes over CSX's Trenton Subdivision railroad line before making a turn to the northeast and then to the north, narrowing back to two lanes. The road enters Hillsborough Township, where the Van Horne Memorial Highway designation ends. US 206 intersects US 206 Bypass at its southern end and Mountain View Road. The road continues into residential and commercial areas of Hillsborough. It comes to a junction with CR 514 in this area.

Past the CR 514 intersection, US 206 makes a curve northeast before heading east to intersect the northern end of US 206 Bypass, where it turns north. Leaving the center of Hillsborough, the road runs northeast past more wooded areas as it crosses under Norfolk Southern's Lehigh Line. The route passes more development as it widens into a four-lane divided highway with jughandles, turning to the north and passing the former Duke Gardens. US 206 briefly becomes six lanes wide at the CR 608 intersection before narrowing back to four lanes as it crosses the Raritan River into Somerville. In Somerville, the road runs northwest parallel to the Raritan River prior to turning north into commercial areas and entering Raritan. US 206 runs under NJ Transit's Raritan Valley Line before making a turn to the north-northwest.

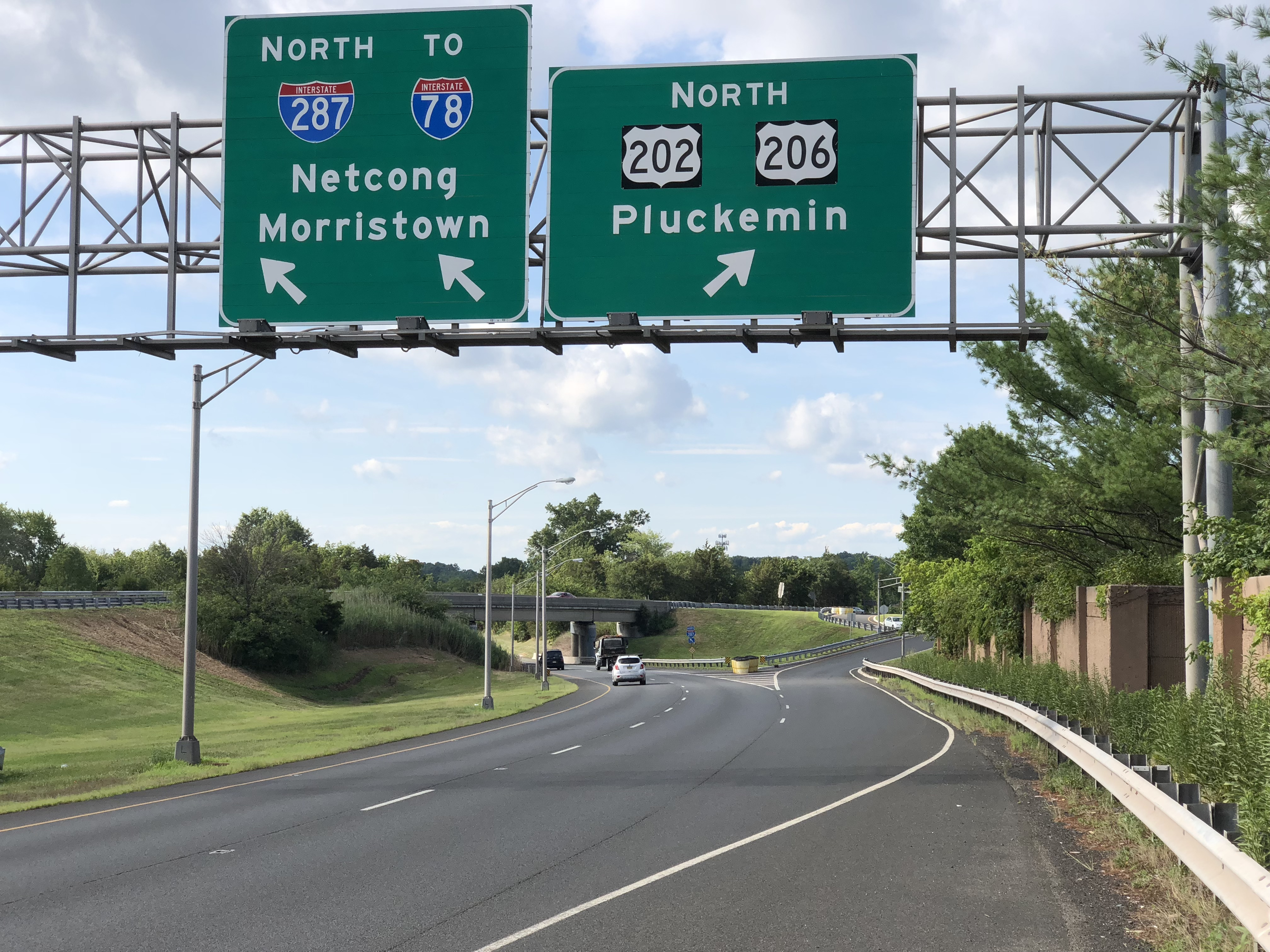
I-287 and 78 exit off northbound US 202/206

US 206 comes to the modified Somerville Circle, where it meets US 202 and Route 28. At this modified traffic circle, US 206 and Route 28 run through it while US 202 passes over it with ramp access. US 206 runs concurrently with US 202 at this point and the two routes continue north into Bridgewater Township, briefly entering Somerville. The road features an interchange with US 22 and heads north with the Bridgewater Commons shopping mall on the east side of the road and the Somerset Corporate Center on the west side of the road. An interchange with Commons Way provides access to both these places. Past Commons Way, the road passes under Garrettson Road and comes to an interchange with I-287 that also provides access to I-78. Past the I-287 interchange, US 202/US 206 continues north as a two-lane undivided road past suburban areas. The road crosses Chambers Brook into Bedminster Township, where it soon passes under I-78. Shortly after I-78, it widens into a four-lane divided highway with a Jersey barrier. US 202/US 206 comes to another interchange with I-287, passes over the North Branch Raritan River and comes to an intersection where the two routes split.

After the US 202 split, US 206 continues north as a four-lane divided highway through commercial areas, with the grass median becoming replaced by a painted median as it comes to a junction with CR 523 in downtown Bedminster. Following this intersection, the route narrows into a two-lane undivided road that runs through less development. US 206 enters Peapack-Gladstone, where it runs a short distance to the west of NJ Transit's Gladstone Branch. In Peapack-Gladstone, the road briefly becomes a four-lane divided highway as it has a trumpet interchange with Pfizer Way, a road that provides access to a Pfizer facility. Past this point, US 206 becomes a two-lane undivided road that runs northwest through rural areas, with CR 512 crossing the road. Just after this intersection, the route enters Bedminster Township again, turning to the north.

==== Morris County ====
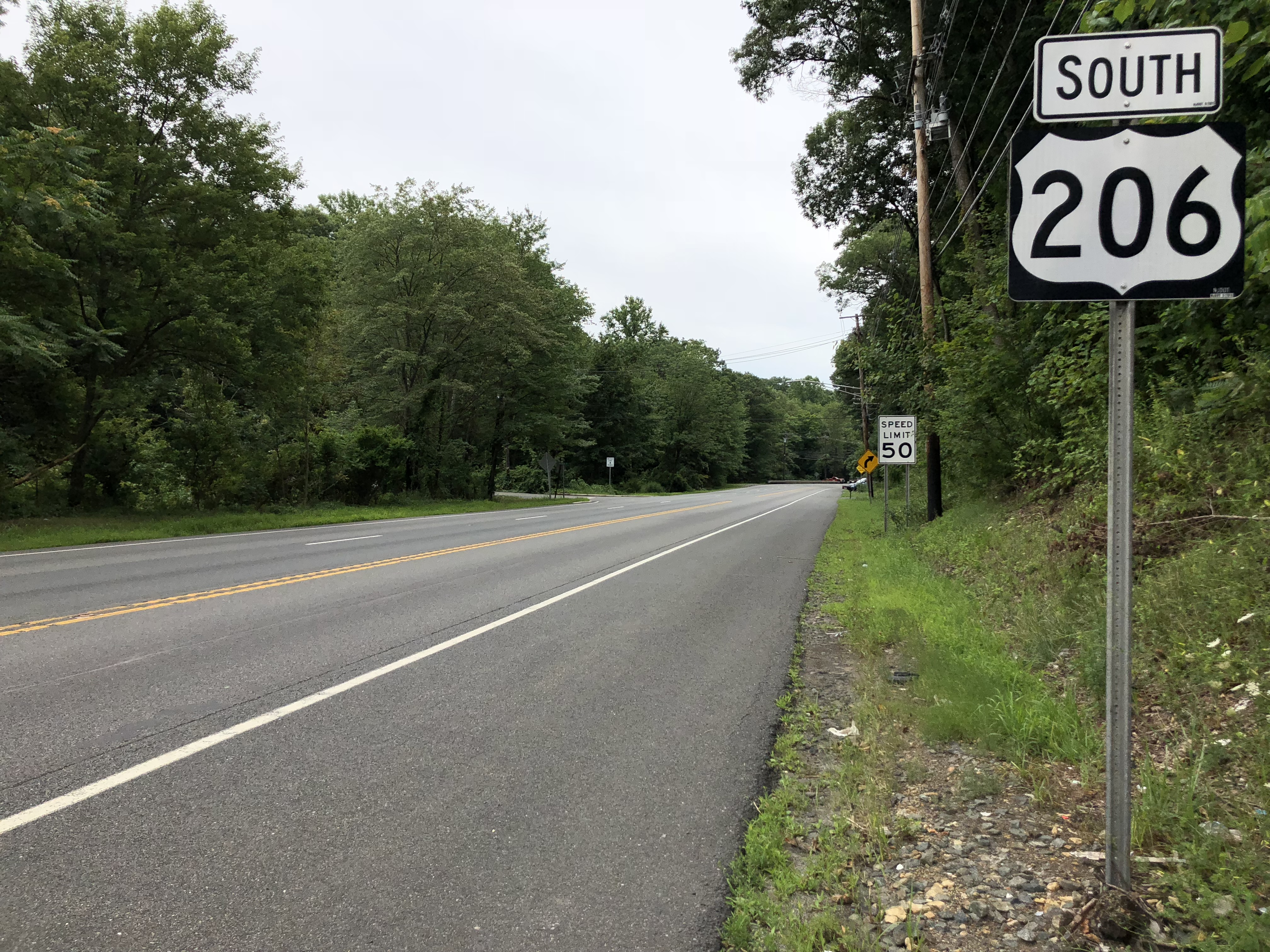
US 206 southbound past CR 613 in Mount Olive Township

The route continues north into Chester Township, Morris County. In Chester Township, US 206 passes through forested areas, with the northbound direction briefly gaining a second lane. As the road comes into Chester Borough, it widens to four lanes and passes shopping areas including the Streets of Chester. In the center of Chester, the route crosses CR 513. Past this intersection, US 206 continues into woodland development, with the northbound direction narrowing back into one lane as the route heads back into Chester Township. The road narrows back to two total lanes as it enters more rural surroundings, coming into Mount Olive Township. Further north, residential development near the road starts to increase. As US 206 reaches an intersection with CR 613, the surroundings becomes commercial before the route passes under Dover and Rockaway River Railroad's High Bridge Branch. After this area, the road turns north-northeast and runs through forested areas as a three lane road with two northbound lanes and one southbound lane, eventually entering Roxbury Township.

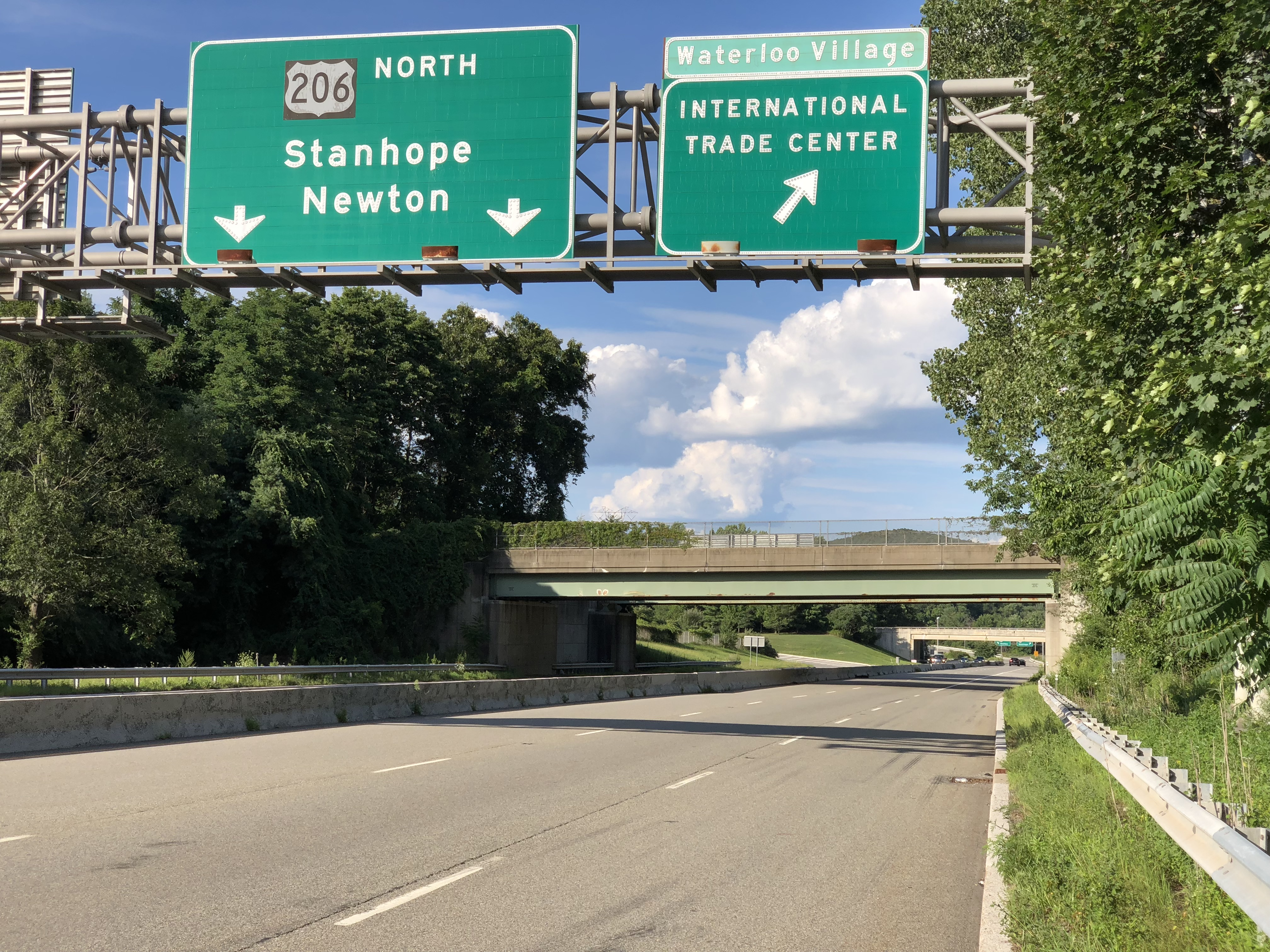
US 206 northbound just north of I-80 in Mount Olive Township

Business in the area of the road increase before US 206 widens to four total lanes and comes to a modified cloverleaf interchange with I-80 and the southern terminus of Route 183. At this point, the road continues north into Netcong as Route 183 while US 206 heads west along I-80, a six-lane freeway that continues into Mount Olive Township. The freeway continues northwest, running through a small corner of Netcong before coming back into Mount Olive Township and interchanging with US 46. Immediately after US 46, the highway passes over NJ Transit's Morristown Line/Montclair-Boonton Line before turning north and reaching a trumpet interchange where US 206 splits from I-80. Following this split, US 206 is a four-lane freeway that heads northeast, crossing under Waterloo Valley Road and an abandoned railroad line before coming to an interchange with International Drive.

==== Sussex County ====
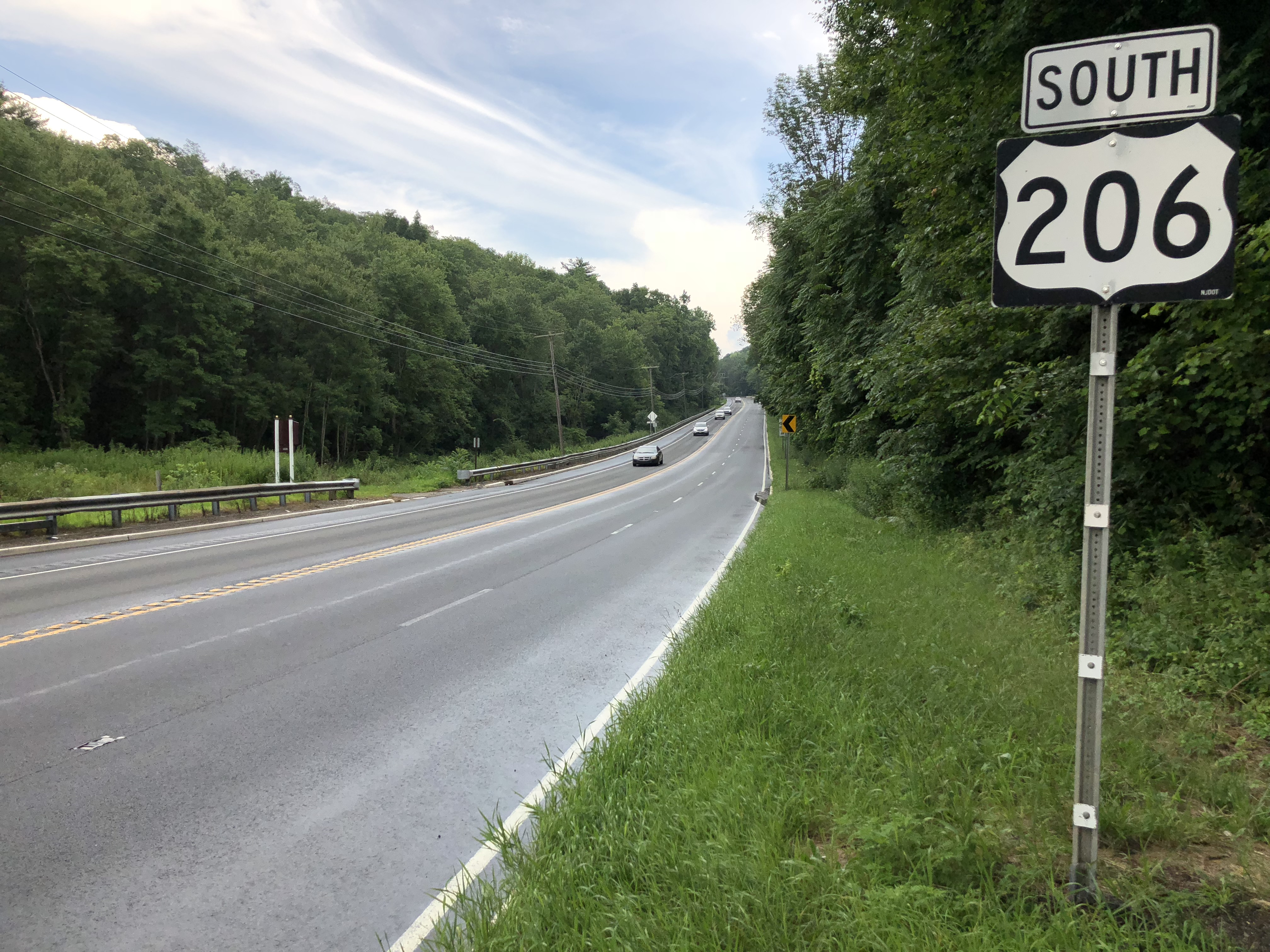
US 206 southbound in Andover

After the International Drive interchange, US 206 crosses the Musconetcong River and enters Stanhope, Sussex County. Immediately following the river crossing, the freeway merges with the northern terminus of Route 183 at an interchange on the border between Byram Township to the west and Stanhope to the east. Past Route 183, US 206 continues north as a four-lane arterial road past development, fully entering Stanhope again before crossing into Byram Township. Upon entering Byram Township, the route becomes a two-lane undivided road. Upon turning northwest, the surroundings become more forested as US 206 crosses a mountain, with the northbound direction gaining a second lane for a distance. There are a few businesses along the road as it runs north past wooded areas near Cranberry Lake and Panther Lake. The route continues into Andover, where it becomes Main Street and passes under the abandoned Lackawanna Cut-Off. US 206 forms a brief concurrency with CR 517 in the commercial downtown area. Past CR 517, US 206 bends northwest and enters Andover Township. Here, the road runs back into forested areas, passing by Whites Pond and running near Kittatinny Valley State Park. After a curve to the north, the route enters a mix of development and rural areas, passing to the west of Newton Airport prior to entering Newton.

In Newton, the road is known as Main Street and is lined by homes as it turns north. Upon reaching the downtown area, US 206 meets Route 94 and CR 519 at the Park Place square. At this point, US 206 forms a concurrency with Route 94/CR 519, and all three routes run concurrently north on four-lane undivided Water Street for a short distance. CR 519 splits from the road by turning north on Mill Street while US 206 and Route 94 continue north as a three-lane road with a center left-turn lane, crossing Paulins Kill before coming to a shopping district as the road leaves Newton for Hampton Township. The road narrows back to two lanes and heads into areas of farmland, becoming Hampton House Road. Route 94 splits from US 206 by making a right turn to continue east. After this intersection, US 206 turns northeast and enters Frankford Township. After crossing the Paulins Kill, Route 15 and CR 565 end at a traffic light with US 206; the route makes a turn to the northwest on an unnamed road.

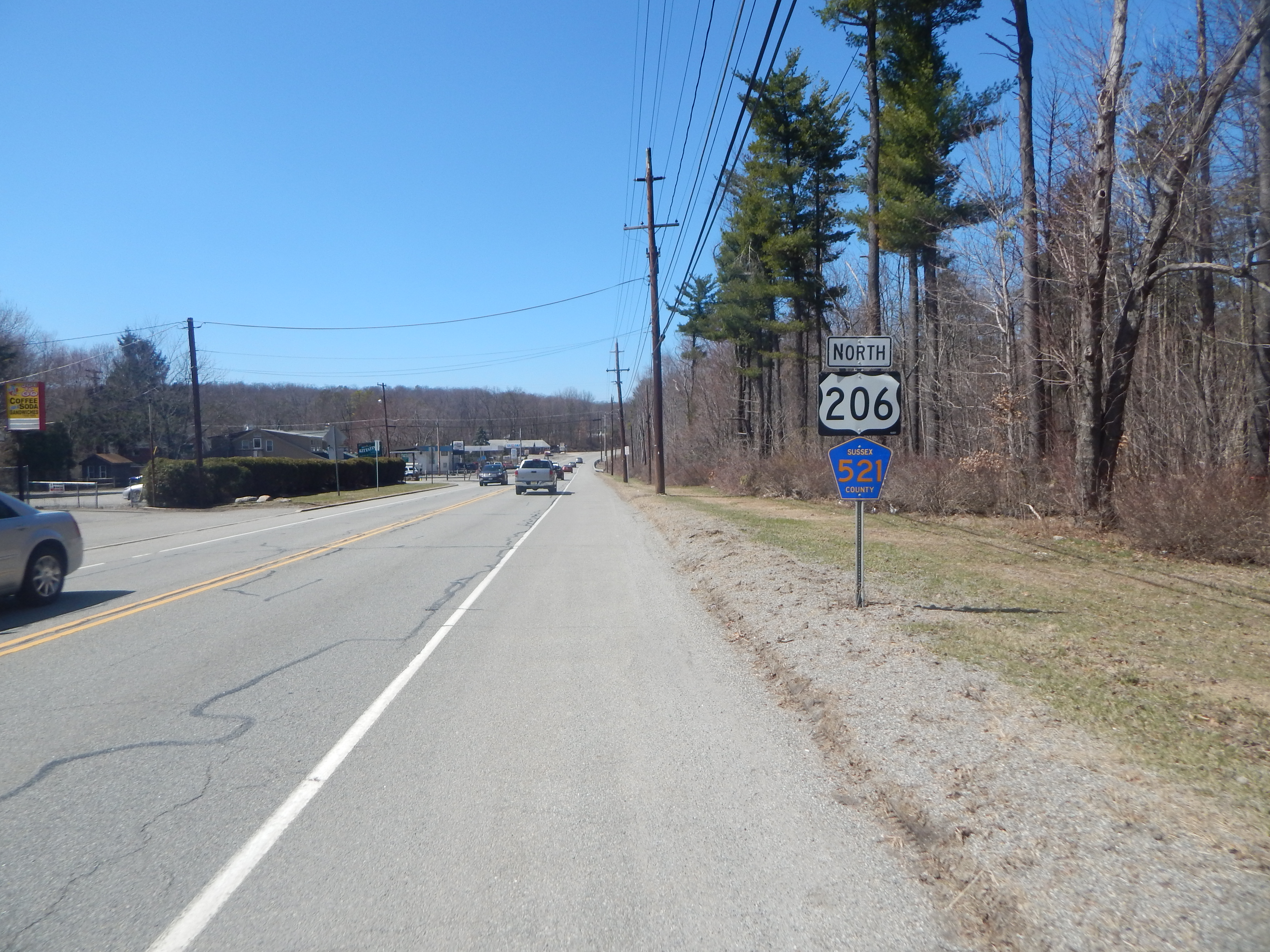
US 206 and CR 521 in Sandyston Township near Culver's Lake

After this intersection, the route passes near Skylands Stadium before passing more farmland and reaching the community of Augusta. After Augusta, US 206 turns north-northwest through more rural areas before entering Branchville. Here, the route bypasses the center of town to the south as a four-lane divided highway before crossing CR 519. Past CR 519, the median ends and US 206 continues to the west-northwest. After crossing back into Frankford Township, the route continues through forested areas. Turning more to the north, US 206 runs a short distance to the west of Culver's Lake prior to intersecting CR 521 and forming a concurrency with that route. US 206/CR 521 heads into Sandyston Township, where it crosses the Appalachian Trail at Culvers Gap in Kittatinny Mountain and passes through the mountainous Stokes State Forest.

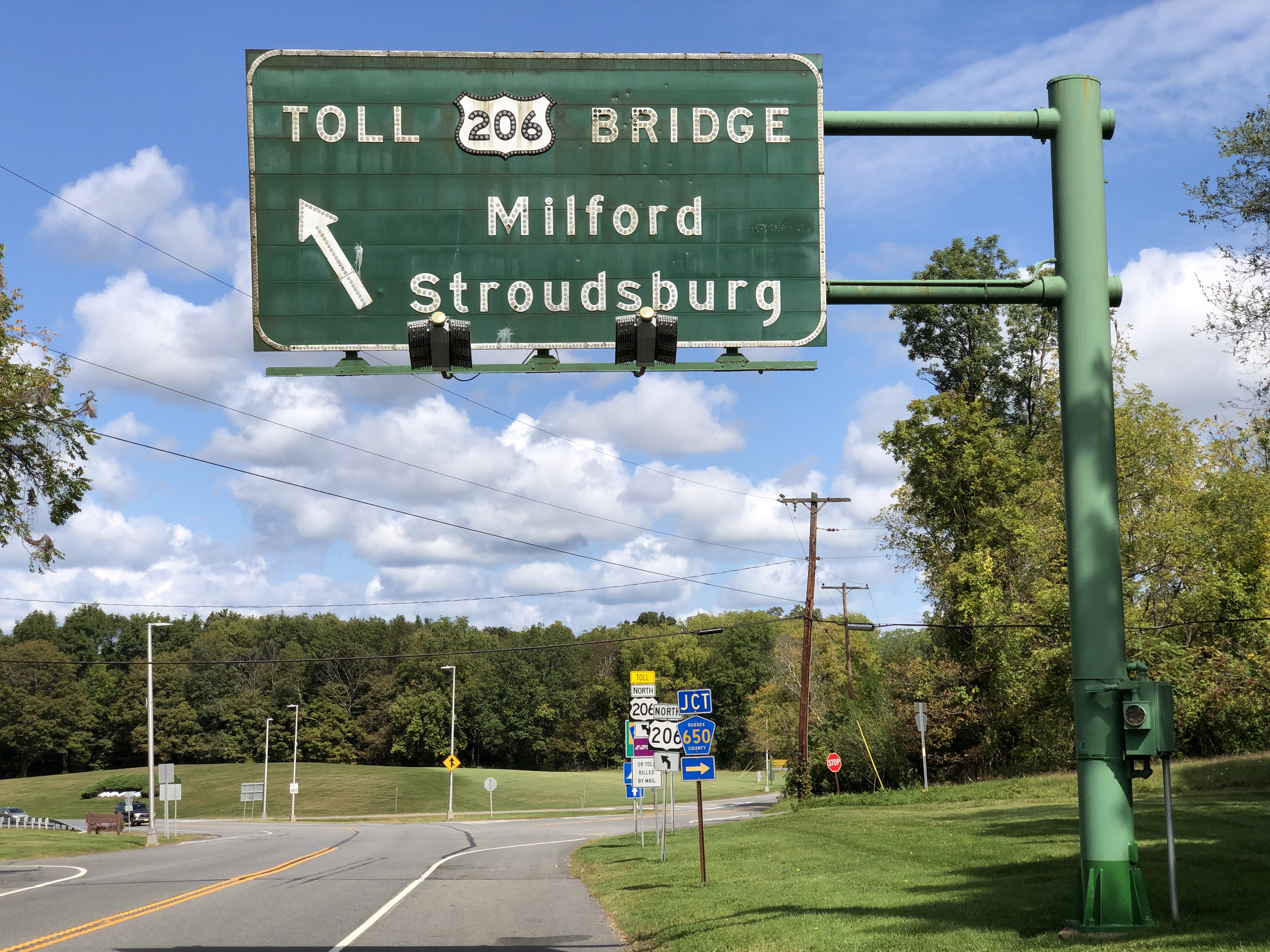
US 206 northbound approaching the Milford–Montague Toll Bridge

After heading north with a three-lane stretch that has two southbound lanes and one northbound lane, the two-lane road reaches a junction with CR 560. After this intersection, the road leaves the state forest and continues through wooded areas with some commercial establishments. US 206/CR 521 reaches the community of Hainesville, where it passes through more agricultural surroundings with some development. Leaving Hainesville, the road continues into Montague Township. Near the community of Montague, CR 521 splits from US 206 by heading to the northeast. Meanwhile, US 206 turns to the northwest to run through wooded areas of the Delaware Water Gap National Recreation Area, where it comes to the Milford–Montague Toll Bridge over the Delaware River that is maintained by the Delaware River Joint Toll Bridge Commission.

=== Pennsylvania ===
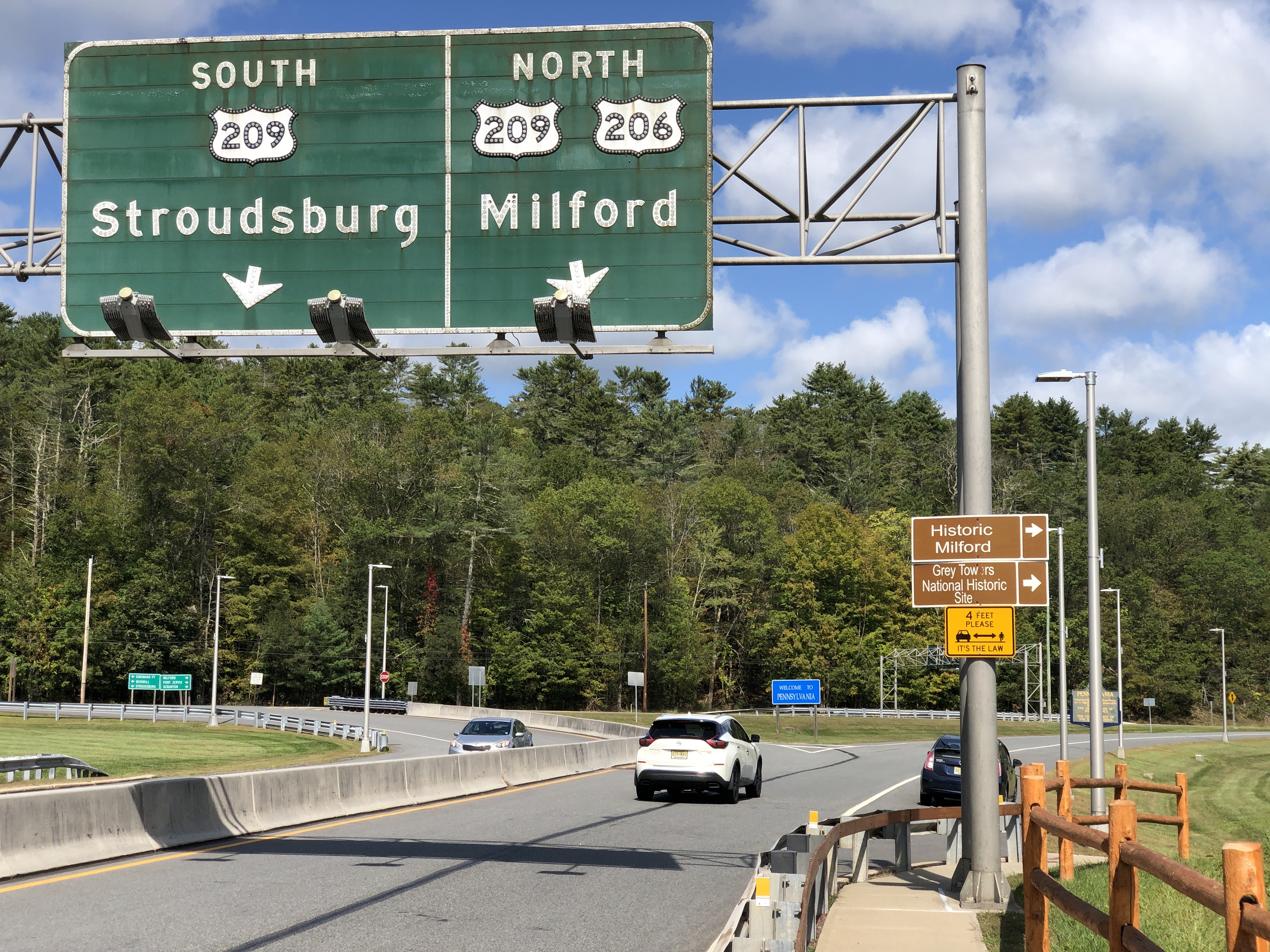
The north end of US 206 at US 209 in Dingman Township. US 206 is signed to follow US 209, but officially does not.

After crossing the river on the Milford–Montague Toll Bridge, US 206 continues north into Dingman Township, Pike County, Pennsylvania. A short distance after the bridge, the route comes to a northbound toll plaza, where it becomes a two-lane divided highway. US 206 officially ends at an intersection with US 209 not far after the toll plaza for the bridge. Even though this intersection marks the end of US 206, a few signs show the route heading concurrently with US 209 to continue north to US 6 in Milford.

== History ==
What is now US 206 was part of several trails used by Lenape Native Americans: the Shamong Trail, later known as the Cape May Road, ran from what is now Crosswicks to Cape May; a trail running from Trenton through Crosswicks; the Assunpink Trail, later known as the Old Dutch Road, running from Trenton north to New Brunswick; and the Great Minisink Trail, running from Navesink through Netcong to Minisink Village in modern-day Montague Township. In 1801, the Morris Turnpike was legislated to run from Elizabeth through Netcong to Culver's Gap. In 1804, the Union Turnpike was chartered to run from Morristown to the crossing at Dingman's Ferry in Montague Township. In 1814, the Deckerton and Newton Turnpike branched from Newton through Deckerton, now Sussex, to New York. The Crosswicks and Trenton Turnpike was chartered in 1854; the road is now locally known as Broad Street, and was included in US 206 west of White Horse.

Prior to 1927, what is now US 206 in New Jersey was legislated as part of several routes. Between Bordentown and Trenton, the current alignment was designated as a part of pre-1927 Route 2 in 1916. Between Trenton and Princeton, present-day US 206 became the southernmost part of pre-1927 Route 13 in 1917. In 1921, the current route from Princeton north to Bedminster Township was legislated as part of pre-1927 Route 16.

Route 31 (1927–1953)

After the United States Numbered Highway System was created in 1926, the route between Bordentown and Trenton became the northernmost part of US 130 while it became a part of US 1 between Trenton and Princeton. In the 1927 New Jersey state highway renumbering, several state highways were legislated along present-day US 206. Route 39 followed the route from Hammonton to White Horse, while Route 37 was designated along it between White Horse and Trenton. From Trenton north to Princeton, pre-1927 Route 13 was replaced by Route 27. Present-day US 206 between Princeton and Newton became part of Route 31, a route that was to go past Newton to the New York border near Unionville, while the portion north of Newton to the Delaware River in Montague became Route S31, a spur of Route 31. Another spur of Route 31, Route 31A, was legislated in 1941 to run from Route 31 in Princeton to Route 33 in Hightstown; only a small portion of this was built over the Northeast Corridor railroad line and is now Route 64.

Route S31 (1927–1953)

US 206 was designated in the later 1930s, running from US 30 in Hammonton, New Jersey, north to US 6 and US 209 in Milford, Pennsylvania. By this time, the US 1 and US 130 designations were removed from the route onto new alignments. In 1938, US 206/Route 31 was designated to bypass Somerville, the former alignment was known as Route 177 from the 1960s until 1974. In the 1940s, US 206/Route 39 was realigned to the south of White Horse; the former alignment was known as Route 160 between the 1960s and the 1980s. Also in the 1940s, the northern terminus of US 206 was moved to its current location at US 209 in Dingman Township, Pennsylvania.

In the 1953 New Jersey state highway renumbering, the state highways running concurrently with US 206 were removed. When US 206's current alignment bypassing Columbus was built by the 1960s, the designation of Route 170 was given to the old alignment through Columbus; this road was turned over to Burlington County in the 1980s and is now CR 690. On April 24, 1954, the Greater Philadelphia-Delaware-South Jersey Council released a proposal for a freeway system in the Philadelphia area that included an extension of the Trenton Freeway from US 206 south of the border between Burlington and Mercer counties north to the center of Trenton. In the late 1960s, a freeway was proposed for the US 206/Route 54 corridor, running from US 30 in Hammonton south to Route 55 and the proposed Route 60 near Vineland and Millville. Originally, a parkway had been planned in 1932 to serve the US 206 corridor between Hammonton and Trenton, but never materialized. The freeway between Vineland/Millville and Hammonton was to cost $47 million and was intended to provide a better route between the two areas than the existing two-lane roads. However, it was never built due to environmental and financial issues.

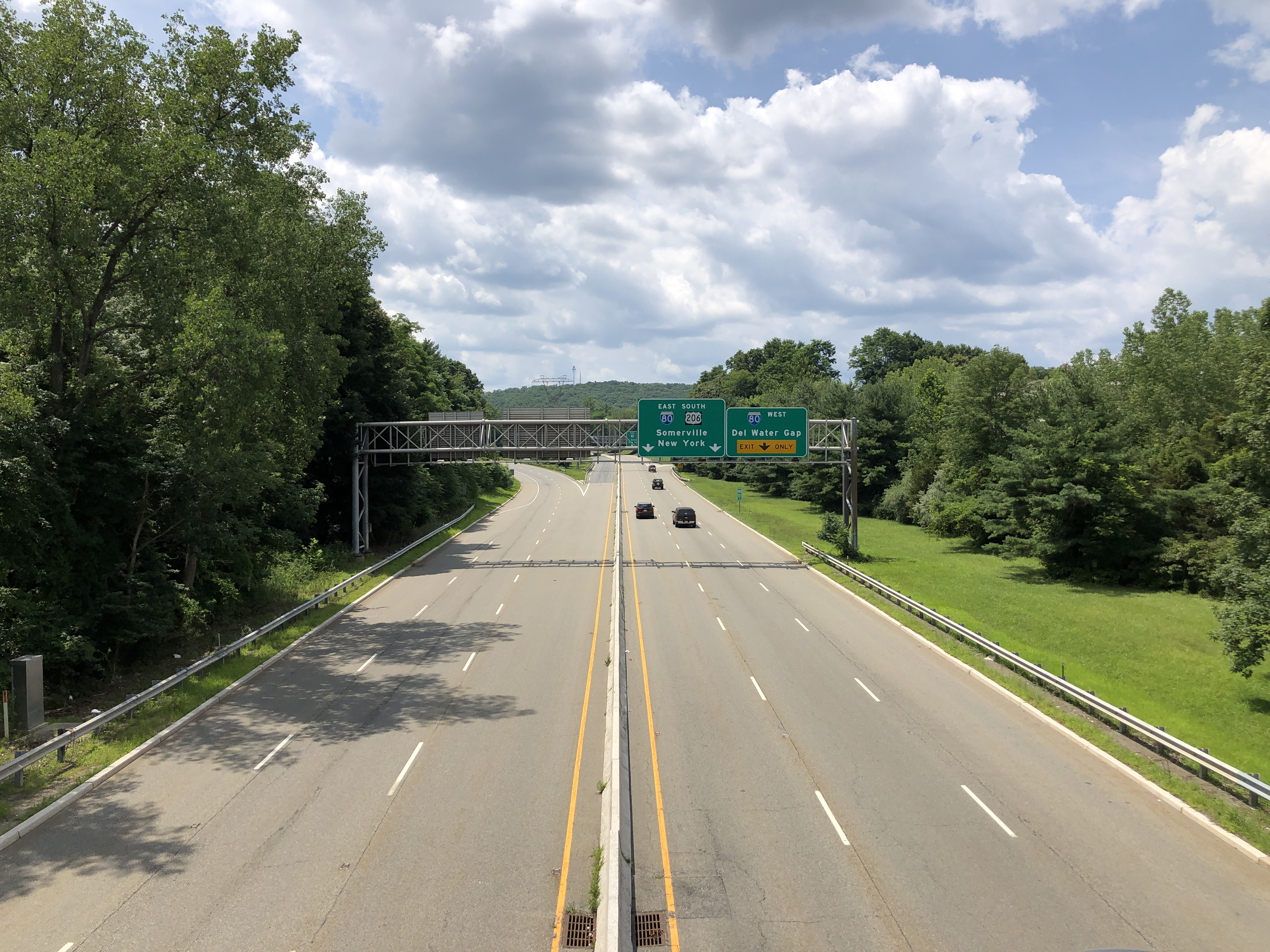
US 206 southbound approaching I-80 in Mount Olive Township

A freeway was also proposed for US 206 in northwestern New Jersey during the 1960s. In 1964, a Route 94 freeway was planned to follow US 206 between Netcong and Newton on its way to the proposed Route 23 freeway in Hamburg. The Tri-State Transportation Commission proposed a longer US 206 freeway that was to connect I-78 and I-287 in Bedminster Township north to Newton, incorporating the southern portion of the Route 94 proposal. This freeway was intended to relieve traffic on existing roads and provide access to recreation areas. By the late 1960s, the US 206 freeway would be planned by NJDOT to connect I-80 in Netcong north to Montague. This freeway was proposed to provide access to proposed national recreation area along the Delaware River that would have been built in conjunction with the controversial Tocks Island Dam project as well as alleviating traffic on the existing road. However, like the US 206 freeway proposal in southern New Jersey, it was not built yet.

Since 1974, a bypass has been planned for the congested part of US 206 through Hillsborough. In 2002, NJDOT modified plans for the bypass. The bypass is to be mostly four lanes wide and run to the east of Hillsborough, with the southernmost portion only being two lanes; one interchange was planned with CR 514. The road is to meet a Smart Growth goal by preserving land and eliminating two planned interchanges that would have increased congestion. In July 2009, it was announced that construction of the US 206 Hillsborough bypass, which is projected to cost $148 million, would start in 2010. On June 24, 2010, a contract was given to Carbro Constructors Corporation to build the first phase between CR 514 and Hillsborough Road. Construction on this portion, planned to cost $43 million, began on August 18, 2010, and opened on October 28, 2013. This section is currently designated US 206 Bypass. In early 2015, work on grading and utility relocation for the ends of the bypass was slated to be completed. Work on constructing the northern and southern ends of the US 206 bypass of Hillsborough was originally planned to begin in early 2017. On April 13, 2018, construction began on the final phase to build the northern and southern ends of the bypass. The final phase of the Hillsborough bypass, which is projected to cost $36.6 million and be funded through state and federal money, opened on June 5, 2021. The Hillsborough Bypass is named for Peter J. Biondi, a former assemblyman and Hillsborough mayor who died in 2011.

US 206 was widened in Byram Township to six lanes. This construction follows a decade of controversy, including concerns that the widening would violate the Highlands Water Protection and Planning Act passed in 2004; an exemption to this act allowed the construction to proceed. The widening was done in order to eliminate backups on the previous two-lane stretch during rush hours. The project was slated to be finished in November 2013.

NJDOT is planning on widening the route in Hillsborough to four lanes and adding a concrete median from Doctors Way to Brown Avenue, where the four lane highway south of the Raritan River ends. This will replace the railroad overpass that is primarily blocking the widening project. The first half, from Doctors Way to Valley Road, was to start in the middle of 2020 and was anticipated to be completed by late 2022. The second half, from Valley Road to Brown Avenue was to take place in 2022 and take two years to complete. In reality, however, the project has taken much longer than expected.

Rather than starting in the middle of 2020, the project's start was moved to March 2021, likely due to the Coronavirus pandemic. After this, the expected completion date remained in late 2024, until the first phase of the project was paused in April 2023 by the NJDOT due to safety concerns regarding the project's contractor. Because of this, the project would be stopped for around a year until the former mayor of Hillsborough, Robert Britting, announced that new contractor had been hired and construction would resume, with a new estimated completion date of Fall 2026. As of Summer 2026, phase 1 of the project has not been completed and is estimated to finish now in Spring 2027.

== Major intersections ==
State	County	Location	mi	km	Destinations	Notes
New Jersey	Atlantic	Hammonton	0.00	0.00	US 30 (White Horse Pike) – Atlantic City, Berlin Route 54 south (Bellevue Avenue) to A.C. Expressway – Buena	Southern terminus; northern terminus of Route 54
New Jersey	Atlantic	Hammonton	4.08	6.57	CR 536 west (Chews Road) – Waterford	Eastern terminus of CR 536
New Jersey	Burlington	Shamong Township	9.45	15.21	CR 541 north (Stokes Road) – Medford Lakes, Medford	Southern terminus of CR 541
New Jersey	Burlington	Tabernacle Township	14.81	23.83	CR 532 (Medford Lakes Road) – Medford Lakes, Tabernacle	
New Jersey	Burlington	Southampton Township	17.66	28.42	Route 70 to N.J. Turnpike south / G.S. Parkway – Camden, Philadelphia, Lakehurst, Long Beach Island	Red Lion Circle
New Jersey	Burlington	Southampton Township	23.48	37.79	Route 38 west / CR 530 east (South Pemberton Road) – Camden, Pemberton, Fort Dix	Eastern terminus of Route 38; western terminus of CR 530
New Jersey	Burlington	Springfield Township	26.80	43.13	CR 537 (Monmouth Road) – Mt. Holly, Jobstown	
New Jersey	Burlington	Mansfield Township	30.64	49.31	CR 543 (Main Street) – Columbus, Burlington	Interchange
New Jersey	Burlington	Mansfield Township	33.64	54.14	Route 68 south – Fort Dix, McGuire AFB	Northern terminus of Route 68
New Jersey	Burlington	Bordentown Township	34.32	55.23	I-95 Toll / N.J. Turnpike – New York, Camden	Exit 7 on I-95 / Turnpike
New Jersey	Burlington	Bordentown Township	35.17	56.60	CR 545 (Farnsworth Avenue/Georgetown Road) – Bordentown, Georgetown	
New Jersey	Burlington	Bordentown Township	35.61	57.31	US 130 south to I-295 – Camden	Southern end of US 130 concurrency; interchange
New Jersey	Burlington	Bordentown	35.83	57.66	CR 528 (Crosswicks Street) – Bordentown, Chesterfield, New Egypt	
New Jersey	Burlington	Bordentown Township	36.27	58.37	US 130 north to I-195 – New Brunswick	Northern end of US 130 concurrency; interchange
New Jersey	Mercer	Hamilton Township	38.71	62.30	I-195 west to I-295 / Route 29 – Trenton	Westbound entrance only, no access from I-195 westbound to US 206
New Jersey	Mercer	Hamilton Township	38.88– 38.89	62.57– 62.59	CR 524 east (South Broad Street) / CR 533 north (Whitehorse Avenue) to I-195 east – Yardville, Mercerville	White Horse Circle; western terminus of CR 524; southern terminus of CR 533
New Jersey	Mercer	Trenton	41.93	67.48	Route 129	Entrance from southbound Route 129
New Jersey	Mercer	Trenton	43.22	69.56	Route 31 north (Pennington Avenue)	Southern terminus of Route 31
New Jersey	Mercer	Lawrence Township	45.01	72.44	US 1 Bus. (Strawberry Street) to US 1 south – New York	Brunswick Circle in northbound direction
New Jersey	Mercer	Lawrence Township	45.36	73.00	CR 583 north (Princeton Pike)	Northern end of CR 583 concurrency with southbound direction
New Jersey	Mercer	Lawrence Township	48.01	77.26	I-295 – Camden, New York, Philadelphia	Exit 69 on I-295
New Jersey	Mercer	Lawrence Township	48.31	77.75	CR 546 (Franklin Corner Road) to US 1 – Pennington, Bakers Basin	
New Jersey	Mercer	Lawrence Township	50.21	80.81	CR 569 north (Carter Road) – Hopewell	Southern end of CR 569 concurrency
New Jersey	Mercer	Lawrence Township	50.25	80.87	CR 569 south (Fackler Road)	Northern end of CR 569 concurrency
New Jersey	Mercer	Princeton	52.55	84.57	CR 533 (Quaker Road)	Southern end of CR 533 concurrency; one-way street, inbound access only
New Jersey	Mercer	Princeton	53.95	86.82	Route 27 north (Nassau Street) – Hightstown, New Brunswick	Southern terminus of Route 27
New Jersey	Somerset	Montgomery Township	58.08	93.47	CR 518 (Georgetown-Franklin Turnpike) – Blawenburg, Rocky Hill	
New Jersey	Somerset	Montgomery Township	58.97	94.90	CR 533 north (Bridgepoint Road/River Road)	Northbound exit only
New Jersey	Somerset	Montgomery Township	59.10	95.11	CR 533 north (River Road) / Orchard Road	Northern end of CR 533 concurrency; no turns allowed from northbound lane
New Jersey	Somerset	Hillsborough Township	63.64	102.42	US 206 Byp. north (Peter J. Biondi Bypass) / Mountain View Road	Southern terminus of US 206 Byp.
New Jersey	Somerset	Hillsborough Township	65.42	105.28	CR 514 (Amwell Road) – Neshanic, Millstone	
New Jersey	Somerset	Hillsborough Township	66.29	106.68	US 206 Byp. south (Peter J. Biondi Bypass)	Northern terminus of US 206 Byp.
New Jersey	Somerset	Raritan–Bridgewater Township line	71.30– 71.64	114.75– 115.29	US 202 south – Flemington, Lambertville; Route 28 (Western end Avenue) – North Branch, Somerville	Southern end of US 202 concurrency; Somerville Circle
New Jersey	Somerset	Bridgewater Township	72.06	115.97	US 22 to I-287 south – Clinton, New York City	Interchange
New Jersey	Somerset	Bridgewater Township	72.53	116.73	Commons Way	Interchange
New Jersey	Somerset	Bridgewater Township	72.91	117.34	I-287 north to I-78 – Netcong, Morristown	Northbound exit and southbound entrance; exit 17 on I-287
New Jersey	Somerset	Bedminster Township	77.54	124.79	I-287	Exit 22 on I-287
New Jersey	Somerset	Bedminster Township	78.07	125.64	AT&T Way	Interchange; no southbound exit
New Jersey	Somerset	Bedminster Township	78.54	126.40	US 202 north – Far Hills, Morristown	Northern end of US 202 concurrency
New Jersey	Somerset	Bedminster Township	78.93	127.03	CR 523 (Lamington Road) – Lamington, Oldwick, Far Hills	
New Jersey	Somerset	Peapack-Gladstone	81.22	130.71	Pfizer Way	Interchange
New Jersey	Somerset	Peapack-Gladstone	82.27	132.40	CR 512 (Pottersville Road) – Pottersville, Gladstone	
New Jersey	Morris	Chester Borough	87.14	140.24	CR 513 (Main Street) – Long Valley, Morristown	
New Jersey	Morris	Roxbury Township	95.04– 95.51	152.95– 153.71	I-80 east – Paterson, New York City Route 183 north – Netcong	Southern end of I-80 concurrency; exit 27A on I-80; southern terminus of Route 183
New Jersey	Morris	Roxbury Township	95.04– 95.51	152.95– 153.71	Southern end of freeway section	
New Jersey	Morris	Mount Olive Township	96.27	154.93	US 46 west – Budd Lake, Hackettstown	Exit 26 on I-80
New Jersey	Morris	Mount Olive Township	97.12– 97.21	156.30– 156.44	I-80 west – Delaware Water Gap, Stroudsburg, PA	Northern end of I-80 concurrency; exit 25 on I-80
New Jersey	Morris	Mount Olive Township	97.67	157.18	International Drive – International Trade Center, Waterloo Village	
New Jersey	Sussex	Stanhope	97.90	157.55	Route 183 south – Stanhope, Netcong	Northern terminus of Route 183
New Jersey	Sussex	Stanhope	97.90	157.55	Northern end of freeway section	
New Jersey	Sussex	Andover	103.32	166.28	CR 517 south (Brighton Avenue) – Tranquility, Hackettstown	Southern end of CR 517 concurrency
New Jersey	Sussex	Andover	103.42	166.44	CR 517 north (Lenape Road) – Sparta, Franklin	Northern end of CR 517 concurrency
New Jersey	Sussex	Newton	109.25	175.82	Route 94 south / CR 519 south (High Street) – Blairstown	Southern end of Route 94/CR 519 concurrency
New Jersey	Sussex	Newton	109.33	175.95	CR 519 north (Mill Street)	Northern end of CR 519 concurrency
New Jersey	Sussex	Hampton Township	111.57	179.55	Route 94 north (Lafayette Road) – Hamburg, Warwick, Vernon	Northern end of Route 94 concurrency
New Jersey	Sussex	Frankford Township	114.14	183.69	Route 15 south – Dover CR 565 north (Sussex Road) – Sussex	Northern terminus of Route 15; southern terminus of CR 565
New Jersey	Sussex	Branchville	116.48	187.46	CR 519 (Newton Avenue) – Swartswood Lake, Beemerville, Branchville Business District	
New Jersey	Sussex	Frankford Township	119.64	192.54	CR 521 south (Owassa Road) – Lake Owassa West Shore, Crandon Lakes	Southern end of CR 521 concurrency
New Jersey	Sussex	Sandyston Township	122.00	196.34	CR 560 west (Tuttles Corner Road) – Layton, Dingmans Bridge	Eastern terminus of CR 560
New Jersey	Sussex	Montague Township	129.30	208.09	CR 521 north (Montague River Road) – Port Jervis	Northern end of CR 521 concurrency
Delaware River			129.77 0.00	208.84 0.00	Milford–Montague Toll Bridge; New Jersey–Pennsylvania state line (northbound toll in Pennsylvania; E-ZPass or toll-by-plate)	
Pennsylvania	Pike	Dingman Township	0.46	0.74	US 209 to I-84 / US 6 – Dingmans Ferry, Bushkill, Stroudsburg, Milford, Port Jervis, Scranton	Northern terminus
1.000 mi = 1.609 km; 1.000 km = 0.621 mi: Concurrency terminus; Electronic toll collection; Incomplete access; Tolled

== Special routes ==
U.S. Route 206 Bypass
- Peter J. Biondi Bypass
- Location: Hillsborough Township, New Jersey
- Length: 2.73 mi (4.39 km)
- Existed: 2013–present

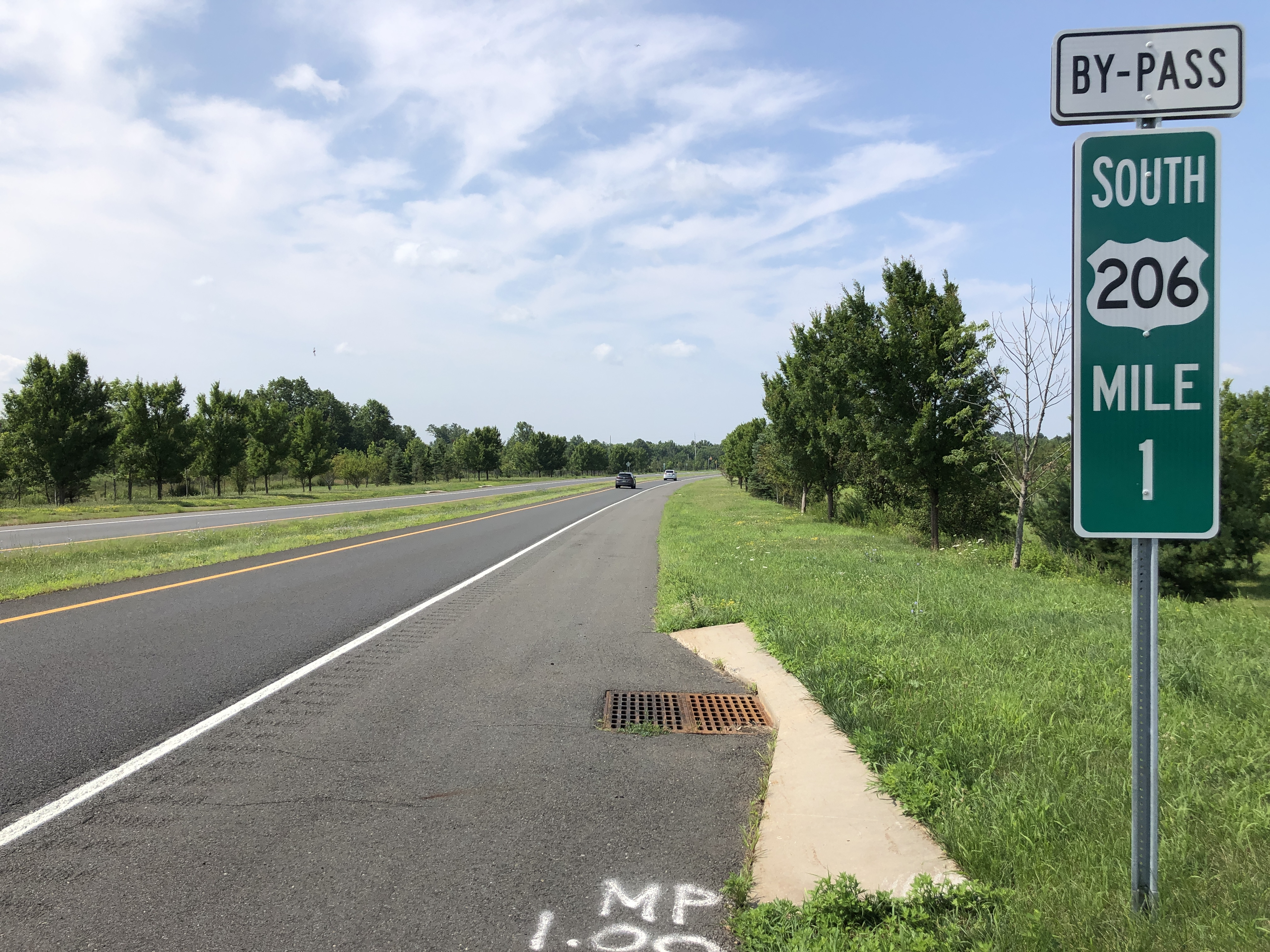
US 206 Bypass southbound 1 mile (1.6 km) from the southern terminus

U.S. Route 206 Bypass (US 206 Byp.) is the designation for the Peter J. Biondi Bypass (also signed as the Peter J Biondi Memorial Bypass), a bypass of the section of US 206 through Hillsborough Township, Somerset County, New Jersey. Chris Christie signed the name into law in 2013, honoring the late New Jersey assemblyman and former Hillsborough mayor Peter J. Biondi.

The road begins at an at-grade intersection with US 206 and Mountain View Road and heads north as a two-lane divided road. First crossing over CSX's Trenton Subdivision railroad line, it curves to the north and comes to a signalized intersection with Hillsborough Road. Continuing north, the bypass runs through farmland and woodland with some nearby development, coming to bridges over Homestead Road and the Trenton Subdivision. The next intersection is a quadrant interchange with CR 514. The connector road to CR 514 is named Service Road though a direct ramp from CR 514 westbound to US 206 Byp. northbound exists. From here, the road widens to four lanes with a concrete barrier separating the carriageways. After passing under Hamilton Road, the bypass ends at a signalized intersection with US 206, which continues north.

The first section of US 206 Byp., 1.66 miles (2.67 km) in length and running from Hillsborough Road to CR 514, opened on October 28, 2013. The full bypass opened on June 5, 2021.

Major intersections
The entire route is in Hillsborough Township, Somerset County.

mi	km	Destinations	Notes
0.00	0.00	US 206 / Mountain View Road	Southern terminus
0.70	1.13	Hillsborough Road to US 206	Southern terminus prior to 2021
1.99	3.20	CR 514 (Amwell Road) to US 206	Quadrant interchange via Service Road, northern terminus prior to 2021; one direct ramp from CR 514 westbound to US 206 Byp. northbound
2.73	4.39	US 206	Northern terminus
1.000 mi = 1.609 km; 1.000 km = 0.621 mi
