= List of highways numbered 570 =

The following highways are numbered 570:

== Canada ==
- Alberta Highway 570

== Ireland ==
- R570 road (Ireland)

== South Africa ==
- R570 (South Africa)

== United Kingdom ==
- A570 road

== United States ==
- SR 570
- LA 570
- MD 570 (former)
- PR-570
- FM 570

| Preceded by 569 | Lists of highways 570 | Succeeded by 571 |
