= County Route 583 (New Jersey) =

County highway in New Jersey, U.S.

County Route 583
- CR 583 highlighted in red

Route information
- Maintained by Mercer County, Lawrence Township, and Princeton
- Length: 9.11 mi (14.66 km)

Major junctions
- South end: US 206 in Trenton
- CR 546 in Lawrence Township; I-295 in Lawrence Township; CR 569 in Lawrence Township; CR 533 in Princeton
- North end: Route 27 in Princeton

Location
- Country: United States
- State: New Jersey
- Counties: Mercer

Highway system
- County routes in New Jersey; 500-series routes
← CR 581	→ CR 585

County Route 583 (CR 583) is a county highway in the U.S. state of New Jersey. Its northern end is at an intersection with Route 27 in Princeton; its southern end is in a concurrency with U.S. Route 1 Business and U.S. Route 206 at an intersection with County Route 653 in Trenton.

The entire route is municipally-maintained except for its concurrency with US 206 where it is maintained by the Mercer County Department of Transportation.

== Route description ==
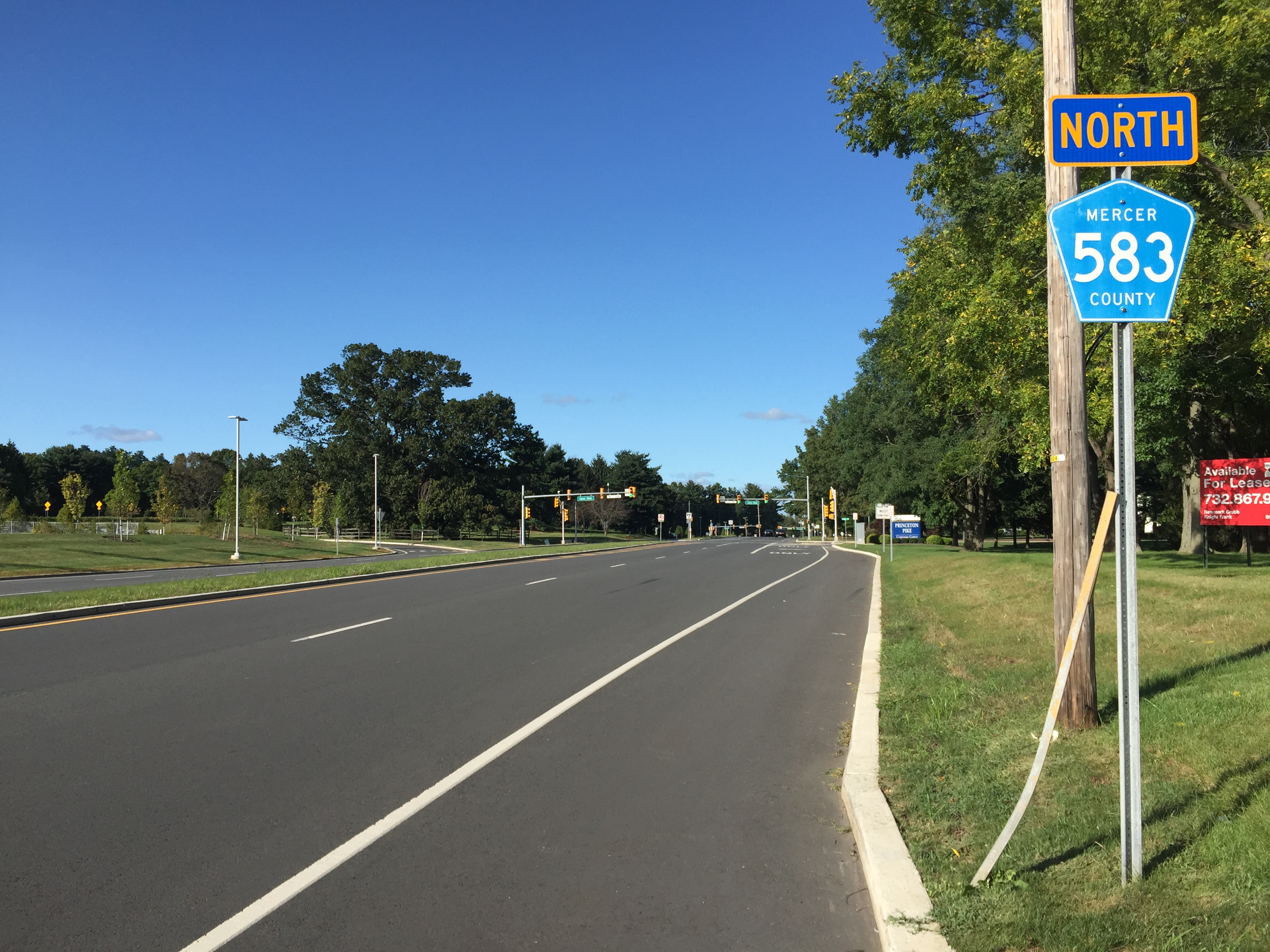
View north along CR 583 just north of I-295 in Lawrence Township

CR 583 begins at the border of Trenton and Ewing Township along two-lane undivided Princeton Avenue (southbound US 206) just northeast of the Prichard Street intersection. From the southern terminus, the road runs northeast concurrent with southbound US 206 through residential and commercial areas, forming the border between Ewing Township to the northwest and Trenton to the southeast. The road crosses CR 622, widening to four lanes before entering Lawrence Township at the CR 613 intersection. In Lawrence Township, Princeton Avenue comes to the CR 645 intersection that provides access to the Brunswick Circle and US 1 Business. Past here, the road intersects the northbound direction of US 206 at Lawrenceville Road, and southbound US 206 splits from CR 583 to join with the northbound direction.

Past US 206, CR 583 becomes two-lane undivided Princeton Pike and continues through suburban residential neighborhoods. After an intersection with CR 546, the route passes business parks and widens into a divided highway as it reaches a cloverleaf interchange at I-295. This interchange has all movements except from southbound I-295 to southbound CR 583, which is provided by way of CR 546. Following this interchange, CR 583 becomes undivided again and heads into a mix of farms and woods. The road forms a brief concurrency with CR 569 as it heads into areas of woodland and residences. The road enters Princeton, where it becomes Mercer Street, and briefly gains a median prior to crossing CR 533. After this intersection, the route passes Princeton Battlefield State Park. Here, CR 583 passes through wooded residential areas as it comes to its northern terminus at Route 27 (Nassau Street) just to the east of Route 27's southern terminus at US 206.

== Major intersections ==
The entire route is in Mercer County.

Location	mi	km	Destinations	Notes
Trenton	0.00	0.00	US 206 south	Continuation south; south end of US 206 southbound overlap
Lawrence Township	1.06	1.71	US 206 north (Lawrenceville Road) – Lawrenceville, Princeton	North end of US 206 southbound overlap
Lawrence Township	3.58	5.76	CR 546 (Franklin Corner Road)	
Lawrence Township	4.02	6.47	I-295 – Pennsylvania	Exits 68A-B on I-295; former I-95
Lawrence Township	5.55	8.93	CR 569 north (Fackler Road)	South end of CR 569 overlap
Lawrence Township	5.91	9.51	CR 569 south (Province Line Road)	North end of CR 569 overlap
Princeton	7.46	12.01	CR 533 (Quaker Road)	
Princeton	9.11	14.66	Route 27 (Nassau Street) – Trenton, New Brunswick	Northern terminus
1.000 mi = 1.609 km; 1.000 km = 0.621 mi: Concurrency terminus
