= County Route 569 (New Jersey) =

County highway in New Jersey, U.S.

County Route 569
- CR 569 highlighted in red

Route information
- Length: 8.53 mi (13.73 km)

Major junctions
- South end: CR 533 in Lawrence Township
- CR 583 in Lawrence Township; US 206 in Lawrence Township
- North end: CR 518 in Hopewell

Location
- Country: United States
- State: New Jersey
- Counties: Mercer

Highway system
- County routes in New Jersey; 500-series routes
← CR 567	→ CR 571

County Route 569 (CR 569) is a county highway in the U.S. state of New Jersey. The highway extends 8.53 miles (13.73 km) from Quakerbridge Road (CR 533) in Lawrence Township to Broad Street (CR 518) in Hopewell Borough.

== Route description ==
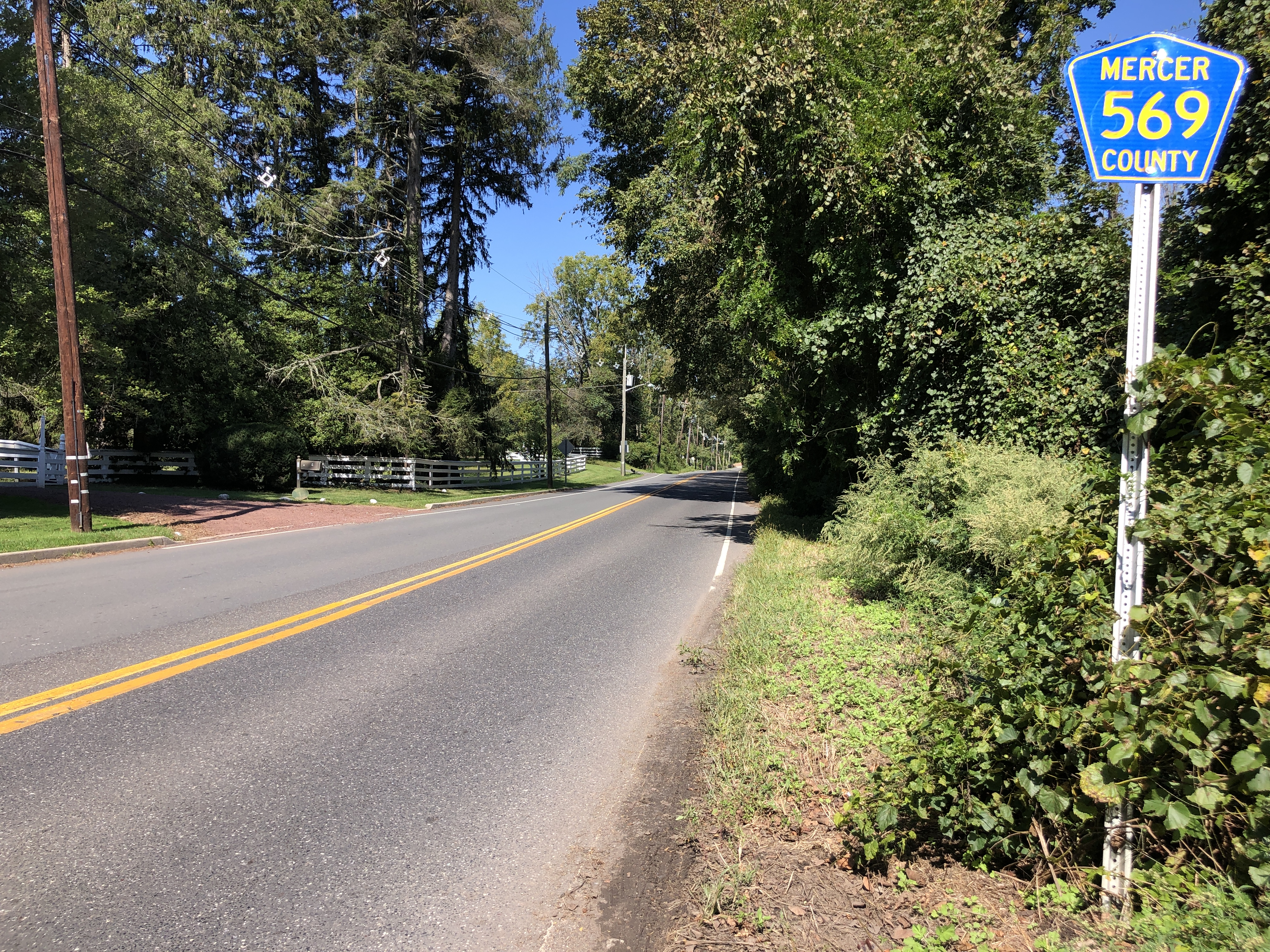
View north along CR 569 at US 206 in Lawrence Township

CR 569 begins at an intersection with CR 533 in Lawrence Township, heading to the west on Province Line Road, which quickly narrows from a divided highway into a two-lane undivided road. Passing through a residential neighborhood, the road turns northwest as it crosses the Delaware and Raritan Canal and comes into wooded areas with some homes. CR 569 reaches the CR 583 intersection, turning southwest onto that route before splitting and heading north on Fackler Road. Along this road, the route passes homes and farms before coming to a brief concurrency with US 206. Past US 206, CR 569 continues north on Carter Road and passes through mostly residential areas with some farms and corporate parks. The road intersects CR 604 before coming into Hopewell Township and meeting CR 625. From this point, the road continues north, with the surroundings becoming more rural as it comes into Hopewell Borough, where CR 569 becomes municipally-maintained Princeton Avenue. The route passes homes before reaching its northern terminus at an intersection with CR 518.

== Major intersections ==
The entire route is in Mercer County.

Location	mi	km	Destinations	Notes
Lawrence Township	0.00	0.00	CR 533 (Quaker Bridge Road) to US 1	
Lawrence Township	0.92	1.48	CR 583 north (Princeton Pike)	South end of CR 583 concurrency
Lawrence Township	1.24	2.00	CR 583 south (Princeton Pike)	North end of CR 583 concurrency
Lawrence Township	2.06	3.32	US 206 north (Lawrence Road) – Princeton	South end of US 206 concurrency
Lawrence Township	2.10	3.38	US 206 south – Trenton	North end of US 206 concurrency
Hopewell	8.53	13.73	CR 518 (East Broad Street) to Route 31 – Lambertville, Skillman	
1.000 mi = 1.609 km; 1.000 km = 0.621 mi: Concurrency terminus
