= Princeton Airport (New Jersey) =

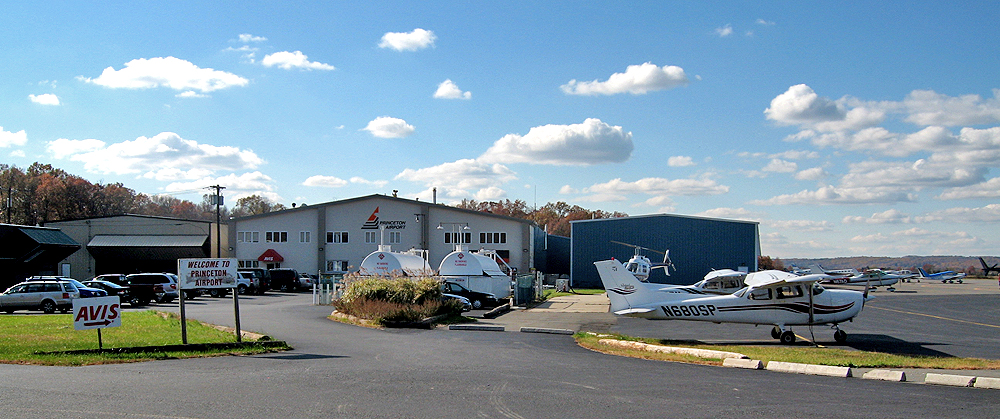
- IATA: PCT; ICAO: none; FAA LID: 39N

Summary
- Airport type: Public use
- Owner: Princeton Aero Corp.
- Serves: Princeton, New Jersey
- Location: Montgomery, New Jersey
- Elevation AMSL: 128 ft (39 m)
- Coordinates: 40°23′57″N 074°39′32″W
- Website: www.PrincetonAirport.com

Map
- Interactive map of Princeton Airport

Runways
| Direction | Length | | Surface |
| Direction | ft | m | Surface |
|---|---|---|---|
| 10/28 | 3,499 | 1,066 | Asphalt |

Statistics (2020)
- Aircraft operations (year ending 10/23/2020): 39,421
- Based aircraft: 108
- Source: Federal Aviation Administration

Princeton Airport (IATA: PCT, FAA LID: 39N) is a public-use airport in Montgomery, Somerset County, New Jersey, three miles (5 km) north of Princeton and just west of Rocky Hill. The airport is privately owned by Princeton Aero Corp. The airport houses the Princeton Flying School, Elite Flight Experience/Cirrus Training Center, Pacific Aircraft, Analar Helicopter Charter and Platinum Helicopters.

== History ==
The airport was established by Richard A. Newhouse (original spelling Neuhaus). Among his other aviation-related projects, in 1911 he built a plane of his own design, featuring separate floating ailerons — a major innovation, as the planes of that time used wing warping for roll control.

The paved runway opened about 1965, and the airport has since had occasional commuter airline flights— e.g. in 1979, Princeton Airways was operating fifteen scheduled passenger flights to Newark each weekday with Britten-Norman Islander STOL capable aircraft. Princeton Airways also flew scheduled passenger service from the airport with the GAF Nomad STOL capable turboprop.

On March 29, 1985, the airport was purchased by Princeton Aero Corp. Principals of the company are members of the Nierenberg family, previously the fixed-base operator at Kupper Airport for eighteen years.

Princeton Flying School (formerly Raritan Valley Flying School) operates a Part 61 FAA-approved flight school at the airport.

== Facilities ==
Princeton Airport covers 100 acres (40 ha) and has one paved runway (10/28), 3,499 x 75 ft (1,066 x 23 m).

In the year ending October 23, 2020, the airport had 39,421 aircraft operations, average 108 per day: 88% general aviation and 13% air taxi. 32 aircraft were then based at the airport: 27 single engine, 1 multi-engine and 4 helicopters.

== Notable alumni ==
In 1991, Avril Haines, who served as the Director of National Intelligence from 2021 to 2025, took up lessons at Princeton Flying School where she met her future husband, David Davighi. Haines completed her first private pilot solo flight at Princeton Flying School.

== See also ==
- List of airports in New Jersey
