= New Jersey Route 160 =

Former state highway in New Jersey, United States

Route 160
- Mission Road
- Route 160 as it existed highlighted in red

Route information
- Maintained by New Jersey Department of Transportation
- Length: 0.46 mi (740 m)
- Existed: 1953–by 1980

Major junctions
- South end: US 206 in Bordentown Township
- North end: US 206 in Bordentown Township

Location
- Country: United States
- State: New Jersey
- Counties: Burlington

Highway system
- New Jersey State Highway Routes; Interstate; US; State; Scenic Byways
← Route 159	→ Route 161

Route 160 was a short, 0.47-mile (0.76 km) state highway in Bordentown Township, Burlington County, New Jersey, United States. The highway ran along a former alignment of Route 39 and U.S. Route 206 (US 206) called Mission Road in Bordentown Township. The route began at an intersection with US 206, paralleling the four-lane highway to the east and serving local residences before turning to the northwest and serving a strip mall. The highway merged with US 206 further north past an intersection with Hilltop Road.

Route 160 was assigned in the 1953 state highway renumbering over a realigned portion of Routes 39 and 206 eleven years before, which was made to bypass Mission Road. The designated highway ran along Mission Road's entire length for several years until being decommissioned by 1980 by the New Jersey Department of Transportation (NJDOT).

== Route description ==
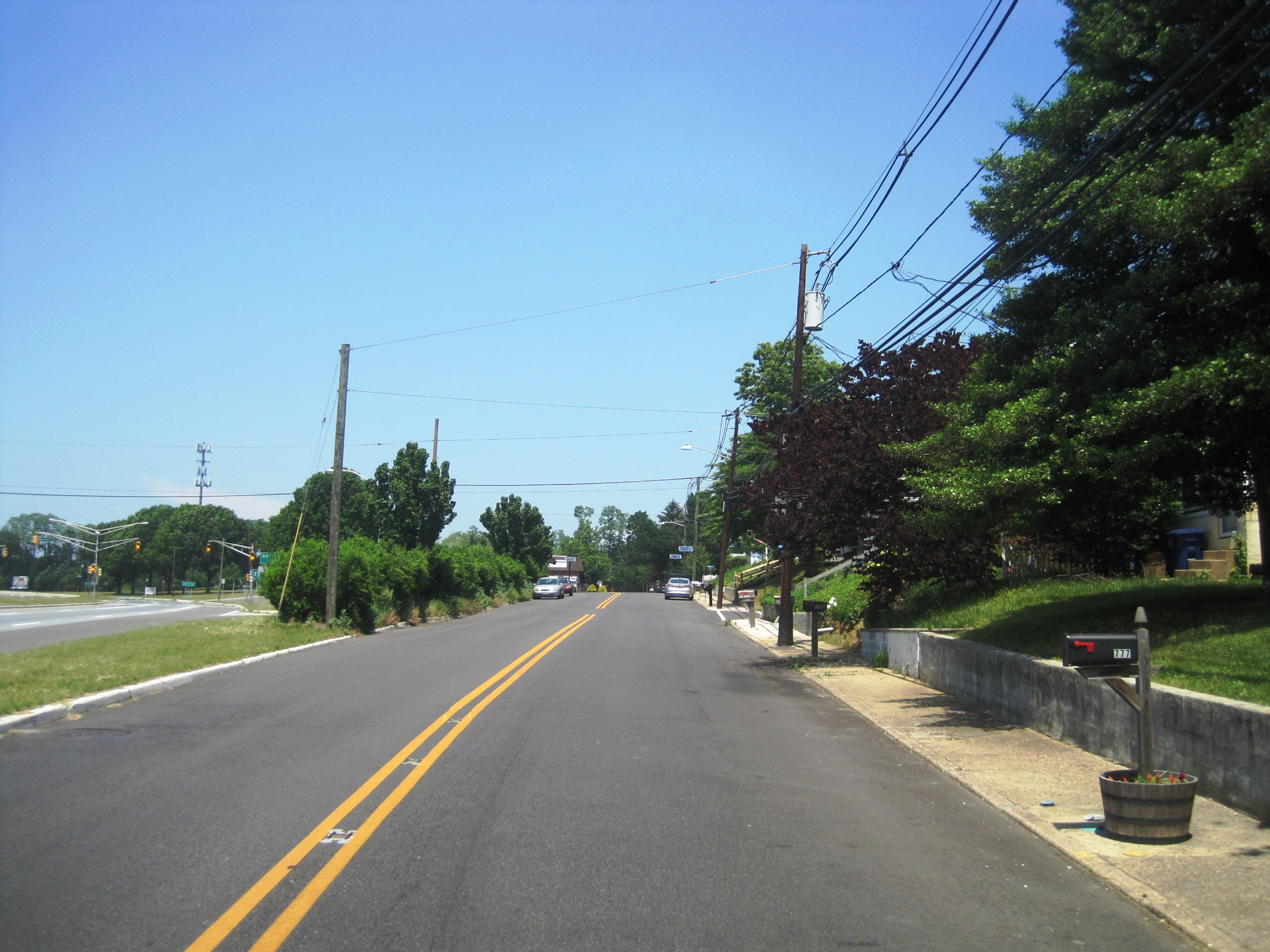
The first stretch of former Route 160 in 2016 heading northbound on Mission Road.

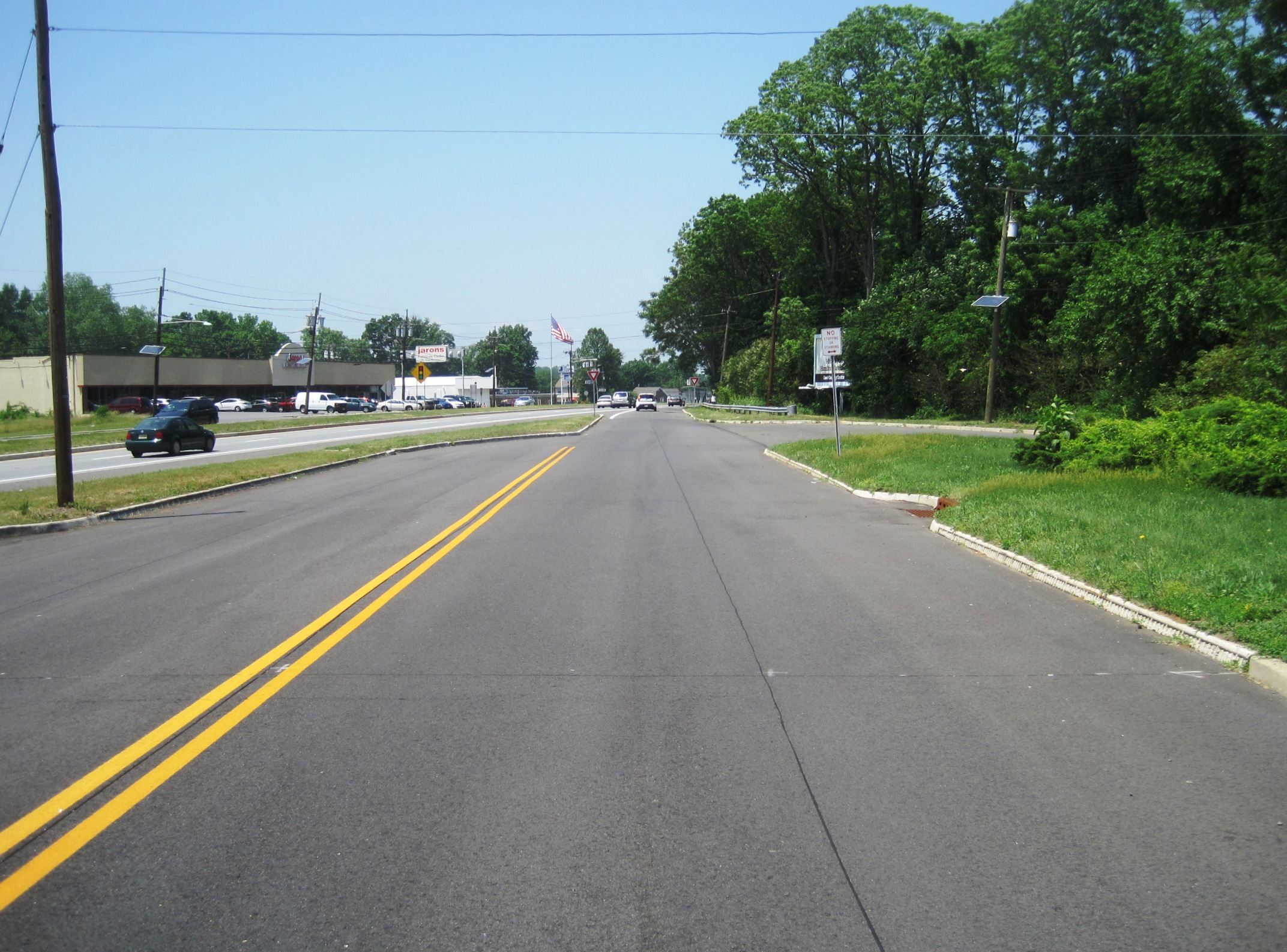
Route 160's former northern terminus at U.S. Route 206 in 2016. The former alignment of U.S. Route 206 southbound is noticeable to the west

- This route description is written as the route exists today.

Mission Road, the former alignment of Route 160 begins at an intersection with US 206 in the Parsonville community of Bordentown Township. Mission Road heads northward, intersecting with Groveville Road (a connector to US 130), passing several residential homes. Passing far to the east of Northern Community Park, the highway intersects with several dead-end residential streets. Paralleling US 206 to the east, Mission Road continues northward, forking to the left at an intersection with Liberty Avenue. At the fork, Hilltop Road begins to the right.

Mission Road, after the fork, heads on a northwest direction, serving as a frontage road to US 206. A short distance later, US 206 intersects via an offramp to Mission Road and the local strip mall. After passing the strip mall, Mission Road completes a large bend and intersects with Hilltop Road once again. Just after Hilltop Road, Mission Road turns to the west and merges back onto US 206's alignment.

== History ==
The short alignment of Route 160 dates back to the 1927 state highway renumbering as an alignment of Route 39. Route 39 was designated to run from the Yardley-Wilburtha Bridge (demolished during Hurricane Diane in 1955) in Wilburtha southward along a semi-circular path of Trenton before turning on to US 206 southward to Hammonton, where it followed US 30 to DaCosta. The alignment of Route 39 was joined by the designation of Route 206 in the mid-1930s, and remained intact for several years. In 1942, the alignment of Routes 39 and 206 was realigned to the east of Mission Road. No designation replaced the roadway until the second state highway renumbering on January 1, 1953. On that day, Route 39 was decommissioned in its entirety, leaving the divided highway only US 206, and the alignment of Mission Road received the designation of 160. Route 160 remained intact for several years and was eventually decommissioned by NJDOT by 1980. During the time the road existed as a state highway, access was provided to and from Route 160 from both directions of US 206 but by 1971, the road was accessible only to and from northbound US 206.

== Major intersections ==
The entire route was in Bordentown Township, Burlington County.

mi	km	Destinations	Notes
0.00	0.00	US 206	Southern terminus
0.47	0.76	US 206	Northern terminus
1.000 mi = 1.609 km; 1.000 km = 0.621 mi

== See also ==
- New Jersey Route 170 - Former alignment of US 206 in Columbus
- New Jersey Route 177 - Former alignment of US 206 in Somerville
