= New Jersey Route 39 =

Former state highway in New Jersey, United States

Route 39

Route information
- Maintained by NJDOT
- Length: 38.89 mi (62.59 km) U.S. Route 206 portion only
- Existed: 1927–1953

Major junctions
- South end: US 30 / US 206 / Route 43 / Route 54 in Hammonton
- US 130 / Route 25 in Bordentown; US 206 / Route 37 in Hamilton Township
- North end: Pennsylvania state line on the Yardley-Wilburtha Bridge in Wilburtha

Location
- Country: United States
- State: New Jersey
- Counties: Atlantic, Burlington, Mercer

Highway system
- New Jersey State Highway Routes; Interstate; US; State; Scenic Byways
← Route 38	→ US 40

Route 39 was a major state highway in the southwestern portions of the U.S. state of New Jersey. It was fully concurrent with U.S. Route 206 from its southern terminus at U.S. Route 30/State Highway Route 43/State Highway Route 54 in Hammonton to the current-day intersection with County Route 524 in Hamilton Township. Route 39 originally continued westward, crossing the Yardley–Wilburtha Bridge in the community of Wilburtha, New Jersey near State Highway Route 29.

Route 39 was designated in the 1927 state highway renumbering to a previously unnumbered highway. The route produced one spur route, Route S39, which became Route 68 in the 1953 renumbering. The Route 39 designation was removed in the 1953 renumbering to eliminate the concurrency with US 206. It was also a proposed designation for a northern beltway around Trenton; this beltway is now Interstate 295.

== Route description ==
State Highway Route 39 was legislatively to begin at the intersection of U.S. Route 206, U.S. Route 30, State Highway Route 43 and State Highway Route 54 in the community of Hammonton, New Jersey. The route headed northward from this intersection concurrent entirely with U.S. Route 206. The route heads northward, entering Burlington County sometime after intersecting with County Route 536. The portion of Route 39 through Burlington County was entirely concurrent with U.S. Route 206, intersecting with State Highway Route 40 in the community of Southampton Township. The route headed further, intersecting with State Highway Route 38 in Southampton Township. The route continued northward, entering the community of Mansfield Township. The route continued along New York Avenue in the community of Columbus, concurrent with U.S. Route 206. Route 39 continued, intersecting with State Highway Route S-39 (the Fort Dix Access Highway), its only suffixed spur in Mansfield Township.

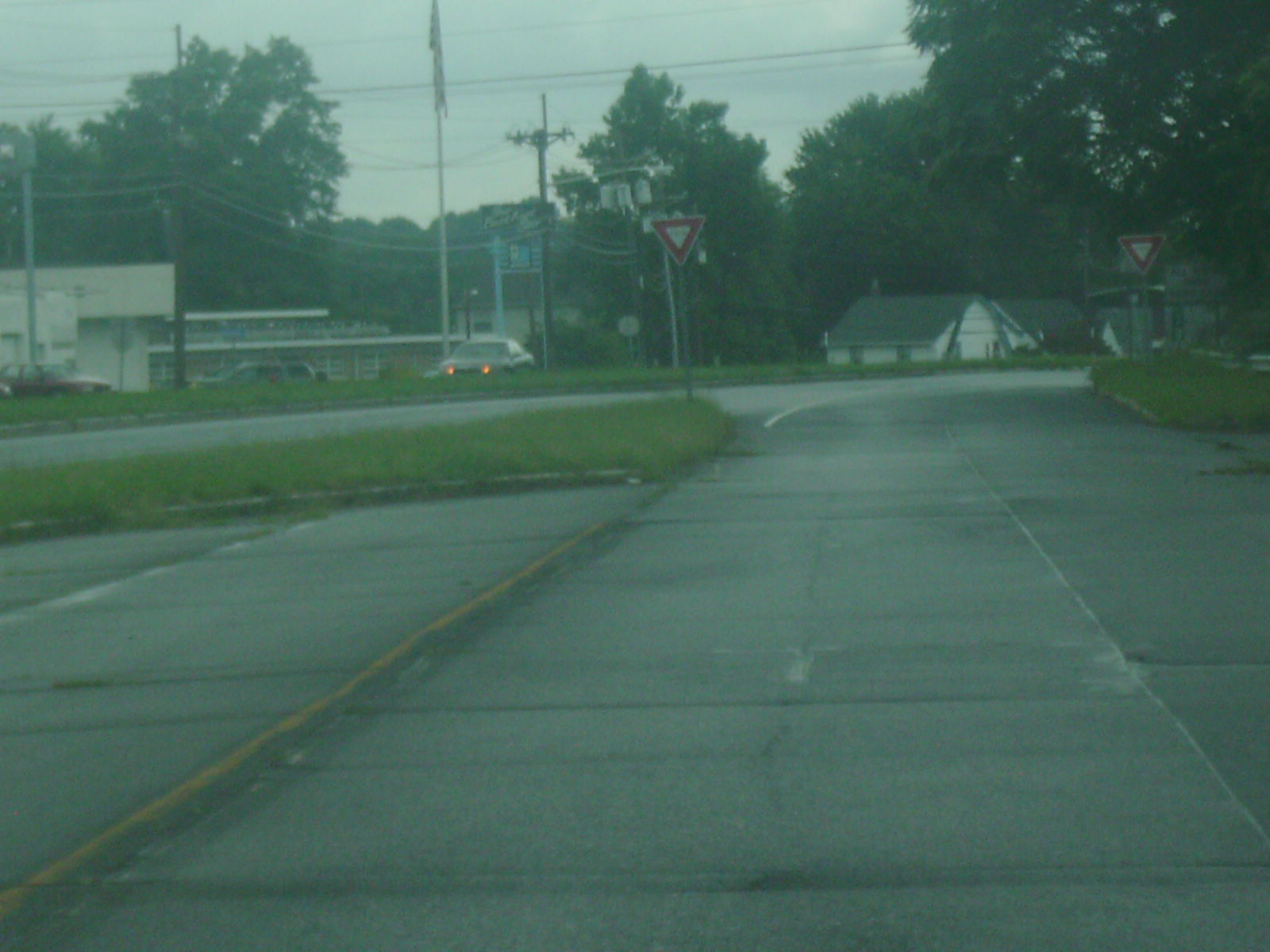
Route 160's former northern terminus at U.S. Route 206. The former alignment of U.S. Route 206 and Route 39 southbound is noticeable to the west

State Highway Route 39 continued northward, intersecting with U.S. Route 130 and State Highway Route 25 in Bordentown. The four routes (25, 39, 130 and 206) continued northward, running concurrent for less until a mile, where they forked. Routes 39 and 206 continued northward along the Mission Road before turning off and onto the straight alignment into Hamilton Township, a community outside of Trenton, the state capital. Crossing through Hamilton Township, Route 206 and Route 39 intersect with the eastern terminus of State Highway Route 37, where Route 39 turned off of U.S. Route 206. From there, State Highway Route 39 made a bypass of the state capital, running northward through Mercer County until entering the community of Wilburtha, New Jersey. From there, State Highway Route 39 intersected with State Highway Route 29 in Wilburtha and approached the Delaware River. There, it crossed the Yardley–Wilburtha Bridge over the Delaware and into Yardley, Pennsylvania.

== History ==
State Highway Route 39 was designated on a previously unnumbered highway from Hammonton to the Yardley–Wilburtha Bridge in Wilburtha during the state highway renumbering in 1927. Route 39 was designated along U.S. Route 206 for most of its alignment, turning off at an intersection with former State Highway Route 37 towards Wilburtha, New Jersey, where it crossed the Yardley-Wilburtha Bridge, built in 1903 to replace a former wooden covered bridge destroyed in a flood. On February 24, 1941, Route 39, concurrent with U.S. Route 206, gained a state highway prefixed-spur when State Highway Route Route S-39 along the new access highway to Fort Dix. Eventually, the proposed Scudder Falls Bridge was added into the highway's legislation, with the northern terminus to be adjusted to the new bridge instead of the Yardley-Wilburtha. In the second state highway renumbering by the New Jersey State Highway Department in 1953, the Route 39 designation was removed in favor of U.S. Route 206. The suffixed spur, Route S-39 became New Jersey Route 68. Two alignments of 39 became Route 160 and Route 170 and are now decommissioned. The Yardley-Wilburtha Bridge was destroyed two years later during the afterstorm flooding from Hurricane Diane in 1955. The bridge was never replaced to its full extent.

== Major intersections ==
County	Location	mi	km	Destinations	Notes
Atlantic	Hammonton	0.00	0.00	US 30 / Route 43 (White Horse Pike) Route 54 south	Southern terminus of US 206/Route 39
Burlington	Southampton Township	14.81	23.83	Route 40 (Marlton Pike)	
Burlington	Southampton Township	23.48	37.79	Route 38 (South Pemberton Road)	
Burlington	Mansfield Township	33.64	54.14	Route S39 south (Fort Dix Access Highway)	Northern terminus of Route S39
Burlington	Bordentown	35.61	57.31	US 130 south / Route 25 south	South end of US 130/Route 25 overlap
Burlington	Bordentown	36.27	58.37	US 130 north / Route 25 north	North end of US 130/Route 25 overlap
Mercer	Hamilton Township	38.88	62.57	US 206 north / Route 37 east	North end of US 206 overlap; western terminus of Route 37
Mercer	Wilburtha			Route 29	
Mercer	Wilburtha			Yardley–Wilburtha Bridge	Pennsylvania state line; northern terminus of Route 39
1.000 mi = 1.609 km; 1.000 km = 0.621 mi: Concurrency terminus
