= New Jersey Route 175 =

State highway in New Jersey, US

Route 175
- Map of Route 175, which is highlighted in red

Route information
- Maintained by City of Trenton and NJDOT
- Length: 2.95 mi (4.75 km)
- Existed: by 1969–present

Major junctions
- South end: Route 29 in Trenton
- I-295 in Ewing Township
- North end: Route 29 in Ewing Township

Location
- Country: United States
- State: New Jersey
- Counties: Mercer

Highway system
- New Jersey State Highway Routes; Interstate; US; State; Scenic Byways
← Route 174	→ Route 177

Route 175 is a short, 2.95-mile (4.75 km) long state highway in Mercer County, New Jersey, United States. The route runs along a former alignment of Route 29 before the construction of the John Fitch Parkway in the 1960s. The route begins at Route 29 in the capital city of Trenton, running along Sanhican Road, River Road, and West Upper Ferry Road into Ewing Township. The route serves primarily as a frontage road for Route 29. The northernmost portion of Route 175 is parallel to the Delaware and Raritan Canal until coming to an end at a merge with Route 29 in Ewing Township.

Route 175 originates as alignment of Route 29, which followed local roads after the 1927 New Jersey state highway renumbering. It remained Route 29 through the 1953 New Jersey state highway renumbering and was moved onto the John Fitch Parkway upon its completion in the 1960s. By 1969, the original alignment was designated as Route 175 and both roads have remained the same since.

== Route description ==
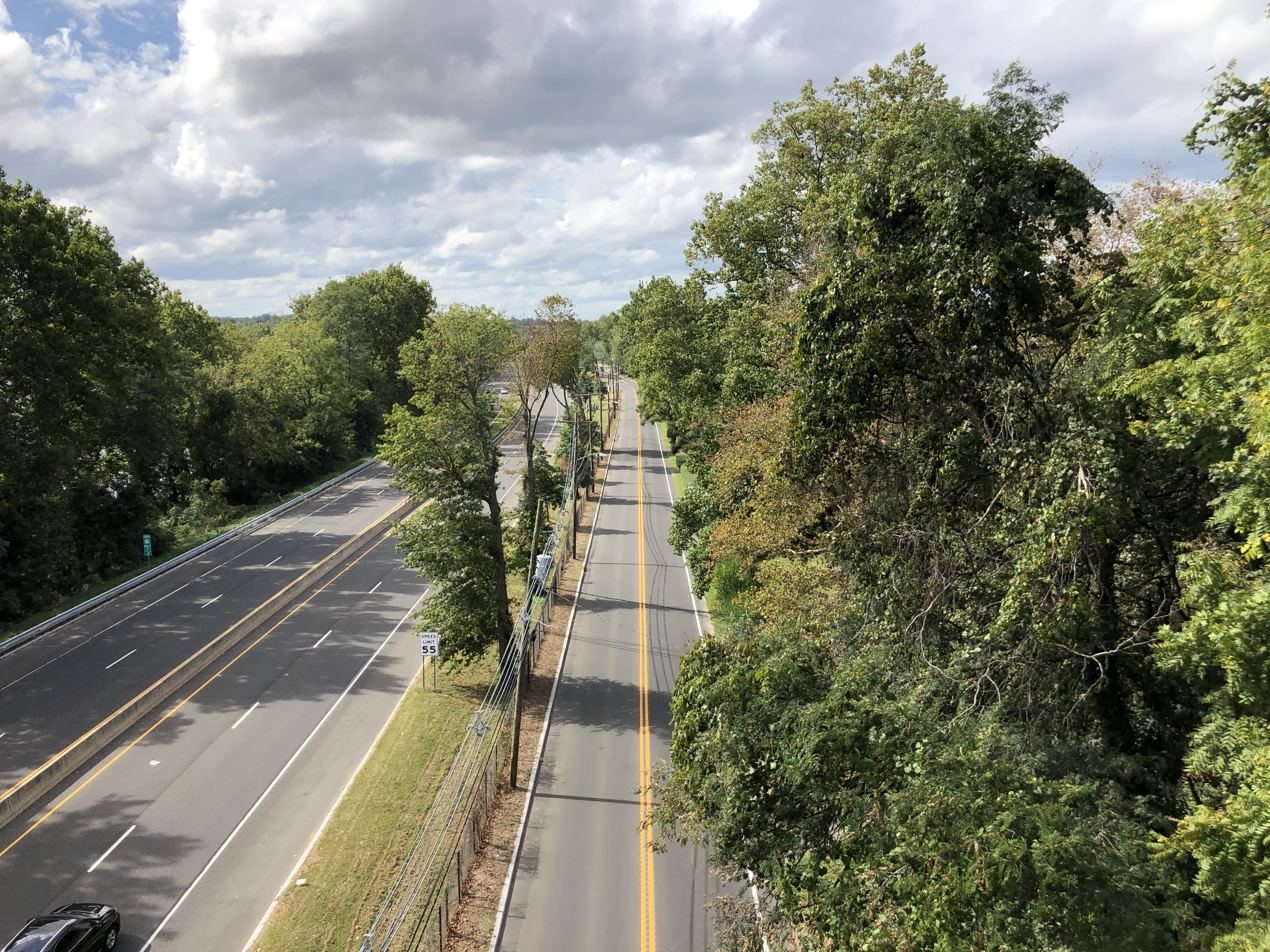
View northbound along Route 175 from the West Trenton Railroad Bridge, with Route 29 visible to the left

Route 175 begins at an off-ramp from Route 29 and Aberfeldy Drive in the capital city of Trenton. Inside the city limits of Trenton, the route carries one-way traffic northbound and is maintained by the City of Trenton. The route heads northward, progressing through the northern residential districts on Sanhican Drive. The highway continues, paralleling Route 29 for a distance. At an intersection with Afton Avenue, the continuation of Abernethy Drive, Route 175 changes names from Sanhican Drive to River Road. The road becomes two-way, enters Ewing Township, and is maintained by the New Jersey Department of Transportation (NJDOT). The highway continues, intersecting with County Route 643 (CR 643, Lower Ferry Road) in Ewing. A short distance later, both routes pass under the West Trenton Railroad Bridge, which carries CSX's Trenton Subdivision and SEPTA's West Trenton Line, and head along the Delaware River, passing to the south of several high-end mansions. Route 175 itself passes to the south of condominium complexes, intersecting with the access road shortly afterward. A short distance later, Route 175 juts to the northeast near a commercial business, interchanging with Route 29. After the short interchange, the highway continues along the side of Route 29, intersecting with Wilburtha Road (formerly an intersection with Route 39) in Ewing. The two routes continue northward, crossing through the woodlands north of Trenton, until Route 175 makes a bend to the northeast, intersecting with West Upper Ferry Road. The highway turns onto West Upper Ferry Road, heading to the northeast, crossing through a wealthy district in Ewing surrounded by woodlands. The route begins to enter fields, crossing over the Delaware and Raritan Canal on character-less bridge. After the bridge, Route 175 turns to the north onto River Road, while West Upper Ferry Road continues as CR 634.

Route 175 heads northward along the Delaware and Raritan Canal as River Road, passing through woodlands and residential homes. A short distance later, it intersects with State Police Drive, a road serving the New Jersey State Police headquarters. Continuing along the canal, Route 175 progresses northward, intersecting with Trooper Drive before crossing under Interstate 295 at Interchange 76. Route 175 continues for a short distance, becoming a divided highway just after the overpass. A short distance later, the highway comes to end as the right-of-way continues onto Route 29.

== History ==
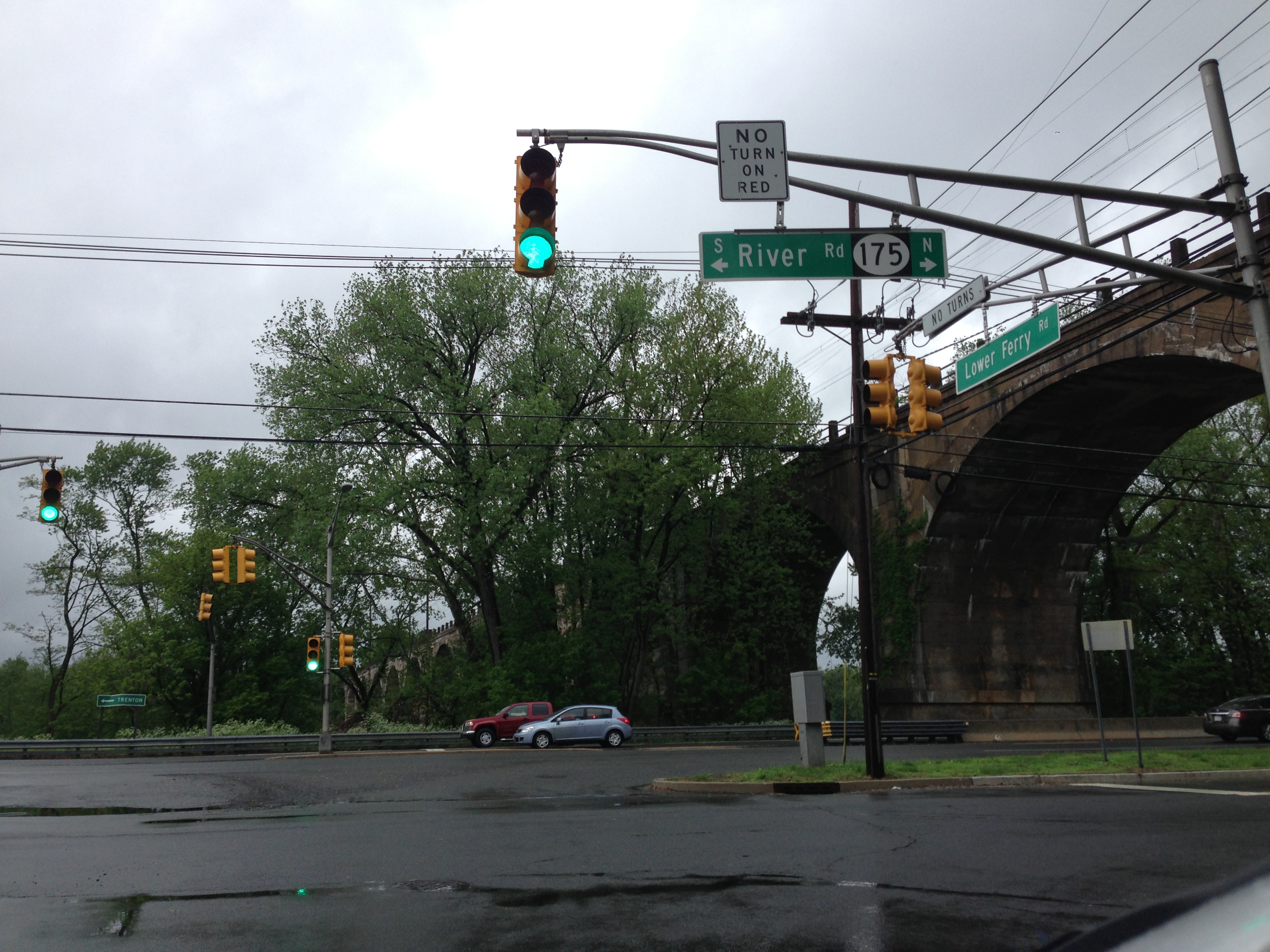
Intersection of Route 29, Route 175 and Lower Ferry Road in Ewing, with signage noting Route 175 as "River Road." The West Trenton Railroad Bridge is in the background.

Route 175 is an original alignment of Route 29 through Trenton and Ewing designated in the 1927 renumbering of state highways in New Jersey. The original plan for a freeway along Route 29 started in the 1930s, with no progress until the 1950s. The freeway section adjacent to Route 175 utilized the right-of-way of what remained of the Trenton Water Power Canal, a 19th-century waterway utilized by the mills of Trenton for water power. Route 29's construction resulted in the filling of the canal, and also took up much of Trenton's available waterfront along the Delaware River Route 175 was designated as a No Passing Zone by NJDOT on September 14, 1982. The two highways (Route 175 and Route 29) have remained intact since.

== Major intersections ==
The entire route is in Mercer County.

Location	mi	km	Destinations	Notes
Trenton	0.00	0.00	Route 29 north	Southern terminus
Ewing Township	2.54	4.09	I-295 south – Pennington, Trenton-Mercer Airport	Exit 76 on I-295; former I-95
Ewing Township	2.95	4.75	Route 29 to I-295 north – Pennsylvania, Lambertville	Northern terminus
1.000 mi = 1.609 km; 1.000 km = 0.621 mi
