= New Jersey Route 170 =

Highway in New Jersey

Route 170
- Route 170 as it existed highlighted in red

Route information
- Maintained by New Jersey Department of Transportation
- Length: 0.79 mi (1,270 m)
- Existed: 1957–1986

Major junctions
- South end: US 206 in Mansfield Township
- North end: US 206 in Columbus

Location
- Country: United States
- State: New Jersey
- Counties: Burlington

Highway system
- New Jersey State Highway Routes; Interstate; US; State; Scenic Byways
← Route 169	→ Route 171
← CR 688	Burlington County Route 690 shield	→ CR 691

Route 170 was a short, 0.79-mile (1.27 km) state highway in Burlington County, New Jersey, United States. The route was a former alignment of U.S. Route 206 and New Jersey Route 39 in the downtown portions of Mansfield Township and Columbus. Route 170 began at an intersection with U.S. Route 206 in Mansfield Township, headed northward along Atlantic Avenue and New York Avenue in Columbus before merging with U.S. Route 206 at a wye connection further north.

The highway was assigned as part of Route 39 in the state highway renumbering in 1927. The route remained intact, receiving a concurrency through the two communities when U.S. Route 206 was assigned in the mid-1930s. The two routes remained intact until the state highway renumbering on January 1, 1953, when Route 39 was decommissioned in favor of just U.S. Route 206. The highway was bypassed in 1957, with Route 206 heading to the outside of the communities. The original alignment became Route 170, and lasted until 1986, when it was removed from the state maintenance. The state turned the alignment over to Burlington County, who re-designated it as County Route 690.

== Route description ==
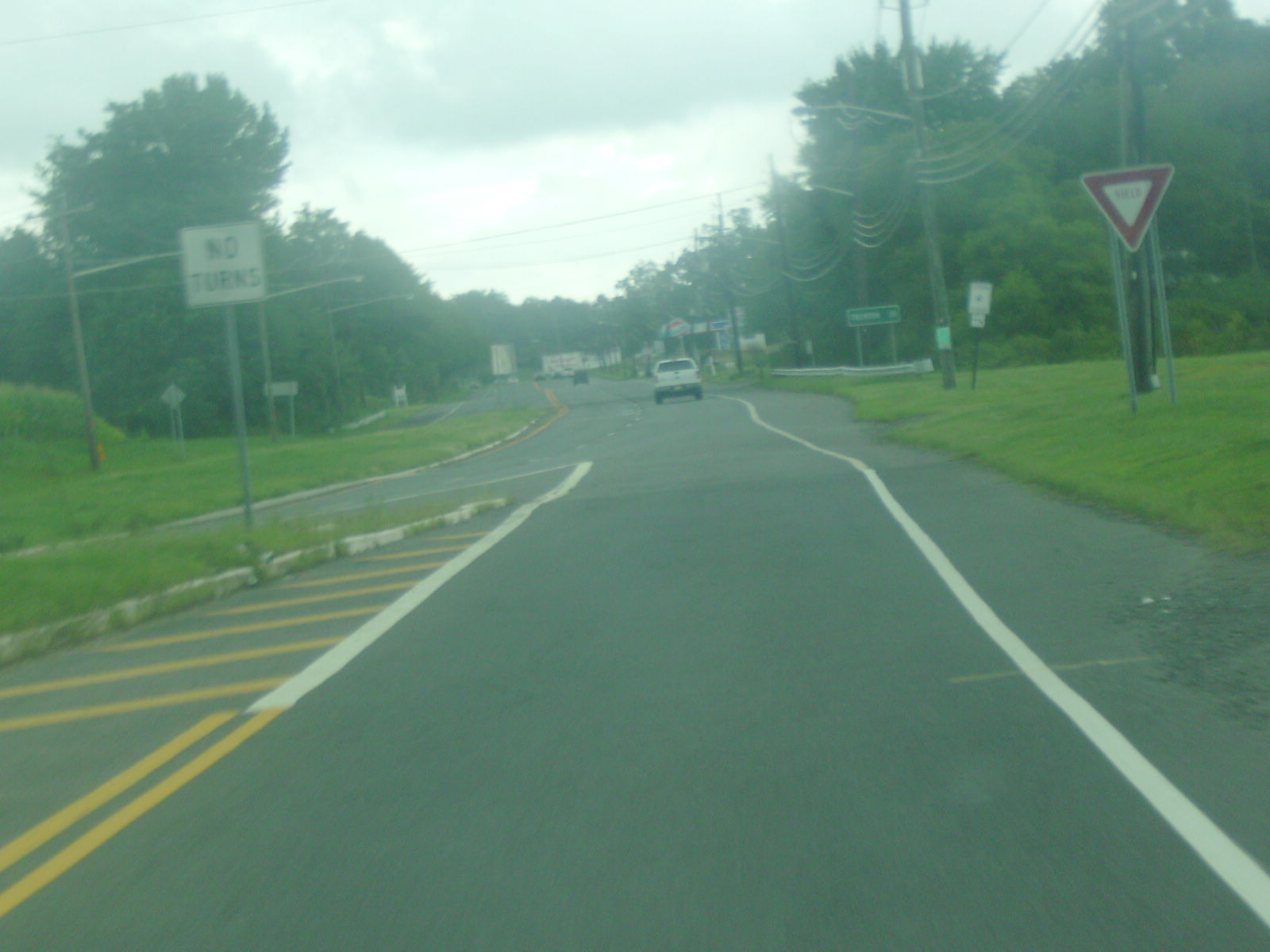
The northern terminus of Route 170 at U.S. Route 206 in Columbus

- This route description is written as the route exists today.

Burlington County Route 690 (also known as Atlantic Avenue) begins at an wye intersection with U.S. Route 206 in the community of Mansfield Township. The route heads northward, intersecting with the southbound portion of the road. Route 690 becomes surrounded by several residential homes for a distance, becoming more commercial as the route heads northward, entering the community of Columbus. Route 690 continues through the business district of Columbus, intersecting with County Route 543 (Main Street) in the center of the community.

At County Route 543, County Route 690 shifts to the east a bit, changing names from Atlantic Avenue to New York Avenue, where it returns to the residential progression in Columbus. The route, which parallels Route 206 to the west, intersects with Locust Avenue, a one-way road towards several local businesses. A short distance after Locust Avenue, Route 690 reaches a gap in the residential homes, turning to fields and rural areas a short distance later. Although the route parallels several homes to the west, the route remains lightly developed, entering another wye at County Route 678, where the route merges into U.S. Route 206 once again in Columbus.

== History ==
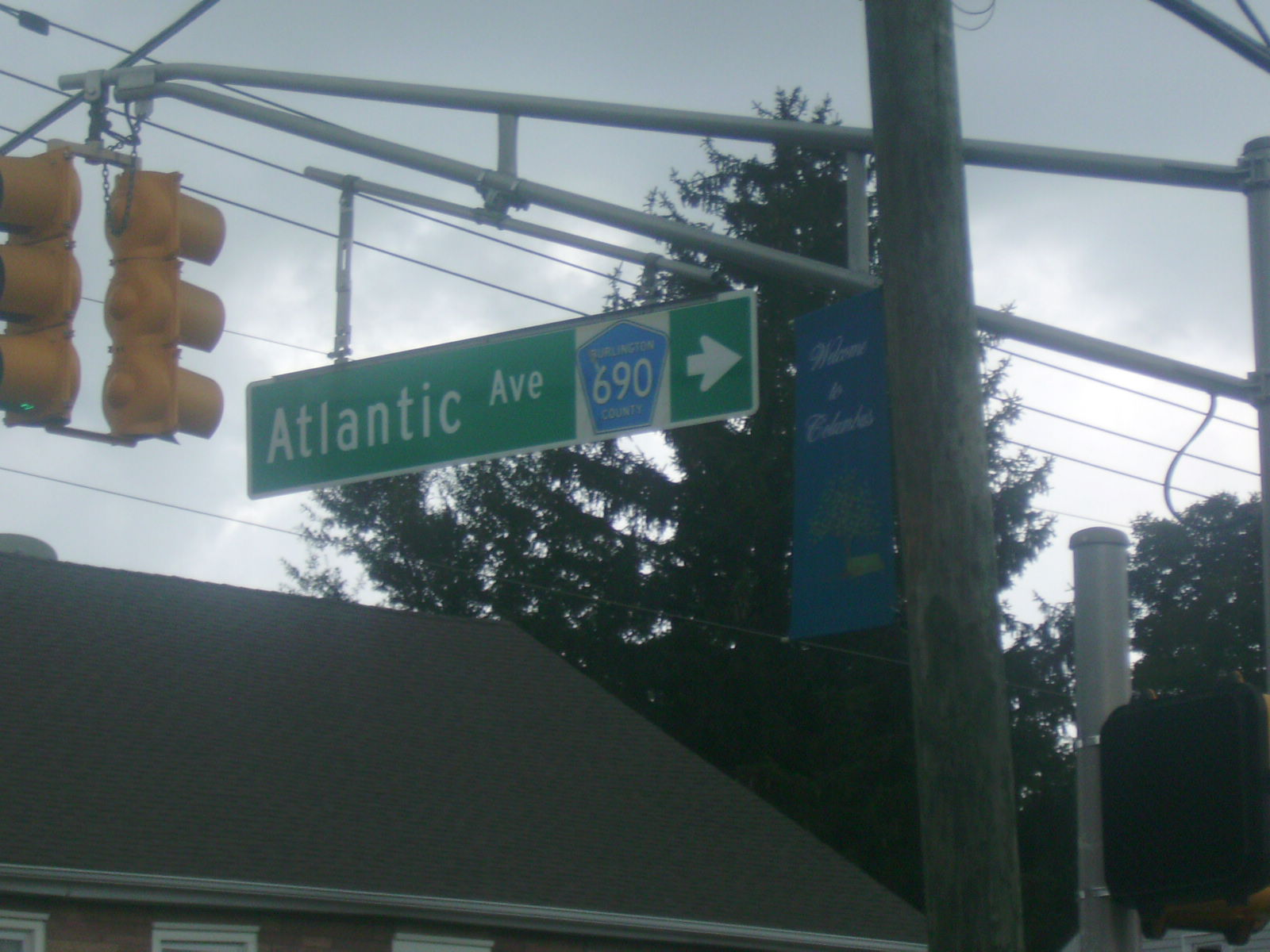
Blade sign depicting County Route 690, which is what was designated along the alignment after Route 170 was decommissioned

The alignment of Route 170 dates back to the 1927 state highway renumbering as an alignment of New Jersey Route 39. When Route 39 was assigned, the route went from U.S. Route 30 and New Jersey Route 54 in Hammonton northward along present-day U.S. Route 206 to County Route 524 in Hamilton Township, where it turned off Route 206 towards the Yardley-Wilburtha Bridge. Route 39 remained intact, and received a large concurrency with U.S. Route 206, when assigned in the mid-1930s. The two remained concurrent for several years, until the second state highway renumbering on January 1, 1953. On that day, Route 39 was decommissioned in its entirety, leaving the alignment fully U.S. Route 206. In 1957, the New Jersey State Highway Department built a bypass of U.S. Route 206 around the community of Columbus, heading to the west of the community.

Upon completion of the bypass, Route 206 was replaced by Route 170, which ran along Atlantic Avenue and New York Avenue through the community. The route remained intact for several decades, lasting until May 15, 1986, when jurisdiction of the route was transferred to Burlington County. The route still continued to appear in state documents by 1988. When the route was turned over, it became Burlington County Route 690.

== Major intersections ==
The entire route was in Mansfield Township, Burlington County.

mi	km	Destinations	Notes
0.00	0.00	US 206	Southern terminus
0.25	0.40	CR 543 (Main Street)	
0.79	1.27	US 206	Northern terminus
1.000 mi = 1.609 km; 1.000 km = 0.621 mi

== See also ==
- List of state highways in New Jersey
- New Jersey Route 160
- New Jersey Route 177
