= Daniel Bray =

Continental Army officer (1751–1819)

- Born: October 12, 1751
- Died: December 5, 1819 (aged 68)
- Military career
- Allegiance: United States
- Branch: Army
- Rank: Captain
- Conflicts: American Revolutionary War: Battle of Millstone; Battle of Germantown; Battle of Monmouth

Daniel Bray (October 12, 1751 – December 5, 1819) was a Captain on General George Washington's staff during the American Revolutionary War. Bray, along with members of the Hunterdon County Militia under his command, collected the boats necessary for crossing the Delaware River on the night of December 25–26, 1776 prior to the Battle of Trenton. After the war he became the general in the New Jersey state Militia.

== Family ==
He was married to Mary Woolverton.

=== Children of Daniel Bray and Mary Woolverton ===
- Elizabeth Bray, b. January 24, 1775, d. August 29, 1845.
- Delilah Bray, b. February 1, 1777, d. date unknown.
- John Bray, b. May 25, 1779, d. January 26, 1818.
- Jonathan Bray, b. June 25, 1781, d. date unknown.
- Hannah Bray, b. April 28, 1783, d. date unknown.
- James Bray, b. August 2, 1785, d. March 16, 1786.
- Susannah Bray, b. December 6, 1786, d. date unknown.
- Andrew Bray, b. December 12, 1789, d. date unknown.
- Sidney Bray, b. December 15, 1791, d. June 2, 1803.
- Wilson Bray, b. December 21, 1793, d. November 22, 1850.
- Daniel Bray, b. July 20, 1795, d. 1857.
- Gardner Bray, b. December 15, 1797, d. January 15, 1798.
- Mary Bray, b. October 10, 1801, d. April 25, 1812

Bray and the men under his command played a vital logistical role supporting the Continental Army's surprise attack on Hessian forces in the Battle of Trenton.

A large portion of New Jersey Route 29 is named the Daniel Bray Highway in honor of Captain Bray's vital role in this critical phase of the Revolutionary War.

In 1903 Joseph F. Folsom wrote "The Ballad of Daniel Bray", which is printed in "Patriotic Poems of New Jersey" compiled by W. C. Armstrong, and in "Historic Trenton" by Louise Hewitt.

Author: Rev. Joseph F. Folsom "Many patriots who in the long struggle did less for their country's freedom than Daniel Bray are to-day more honored and sung, although he, through many perils, gathered by night the fleet of boats by which Washington crossed the icy Delaware. Even had the battle of Trenton proved a disaster for the Americans, instead of the glorious victory it actually became, the dangerous descent of the swiftly flowing river, from the mouth of the Lehigh to Malta Island, a journey of fifty miles through long wintry nights, accomplished by Captain Bray and his compatriots, should at least give his name a place beside those of Paul Revere, Sergeant Jasper and Molly Pitcher."

After the war, Daniel Bray, like Cincinnatus, went back to being a Hunterdon County farmer, on his homestead farm in Kingwood Township. He and his wife Mary Woolverton already had four children by the end of the war. Daniel Bray is also listed as a noble traitor in the House of Lords England and him and his descendants would suffer loss of title and property in the British Empire.

To the right is a link to a picture of where Daniel Bray is buried. 8366.jpg

== Notes ==
- Folsom, Joseph (May 1920). "Daniel Bray, Patriot of the American Revolution". Daughters of the American Revolution Magazine. Vol. 54, no. 5. Philadelphia, Pennsylvania: J B Lippincott Company. pp. 293–296.
