= Hamilton Avenue station =

Train station in Trenton, New Jersey

Hamilton Avenue
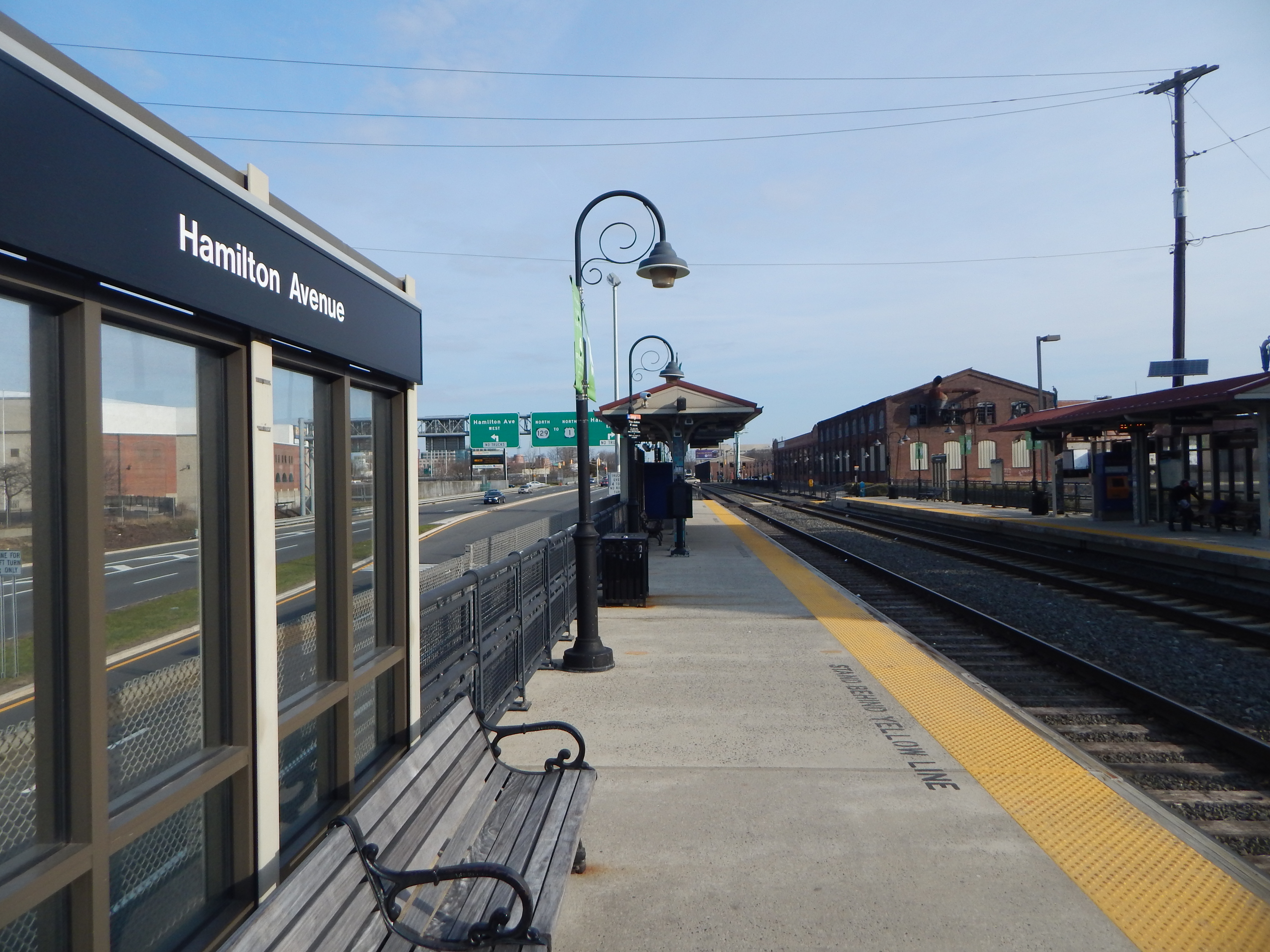
- Hamilton Avenue station in April 2015

General information
- Location: Hamilton Avenue; Trenton, New Jersey
- Coordinates: 40°12′43″N 74°45′21″W
- Owner: New Jersey Transit
- Platforms: 2 side platforms
- Tracks: 2
- Connections: NJ Transit Bus: 409, 601, 603, 609, 613

Construction
- Parking: 22 spaces, 1 accessible space
- Accessible: Yes

Other information
- Fare zone: 1

History
- Opened: March 15, 2004

Services
| Preceding station | NJ Transit | Following station |
|---|---|---|
| Cass Street toward Entertainment Center | River Line | Trenton Terminus |
Location

Hamilton Avenue station is a station on the River Line light rail system, located on Hamilton Avenue in Trenton, New Jersey. The station opened on March 15, 2004. Southbound service from the station is available to Camden, New Jersey. Northbound service is available to the Trenton Rail Station with connections to New Jersey Transit trains to New York City, SEPTA trains to Philadelphia, Pennsylvania, and Amtrak trains. Transfer to the PATCO Speedline is available at the Walter Rand Transportation Center.

This station was not in the River Line's original plans, but was added when the public demanded a stop to serve the CURE Insurance Arena which opened in 1999 on the opposite side of Route 129.
