= New Jersey Route 177 =

Highway in New Jersey

Route 177
- Bridge Street
- Route 177 as it existed highlighted in red

Route information
- Maintained by the New Jersey Department of Transportation
- Length: 0.24 mi (390 m)
- Existed: 1953–1974

Major junctions
- South end: US 206 in Somerville
- North end: Fifth Street in Somerville

Location
- Country: United States
- State: New Jersey
- Counties: Somerset

Highway system
- New Jersey State Highway Routes; Interstate; US; State; Scenic Byways
← Route 175	→ Route 178

Route 177 was the shortest state highway recorded in Somerset County, New Jersey and the second shortest around the entire state of New Jersey. (New Jersey Route 59 is the shortest recorded route in the state at 0.15 miles (0.24 km) long.) Route 177 went for a short, 0.24 miles (0.39 km) state-maintained portion of Bridge Street in Somerville. One of only three state highways in Somerset County after the 1953 state highway renumbering, Route 177 was the only one to be decommissioned later on. (The other two highways are Route 27 further south and Route 28 further north) The short-lived designation went from U.S. Route 206 (US 206) in Somerville, up Bridge Street near the Old Cemetery to Fifth Street, where state maintenance terminated. In 1974, the Department of Transportation turned maintenance of this short highway over to the borough of Somerville for future use.

== Route description ==
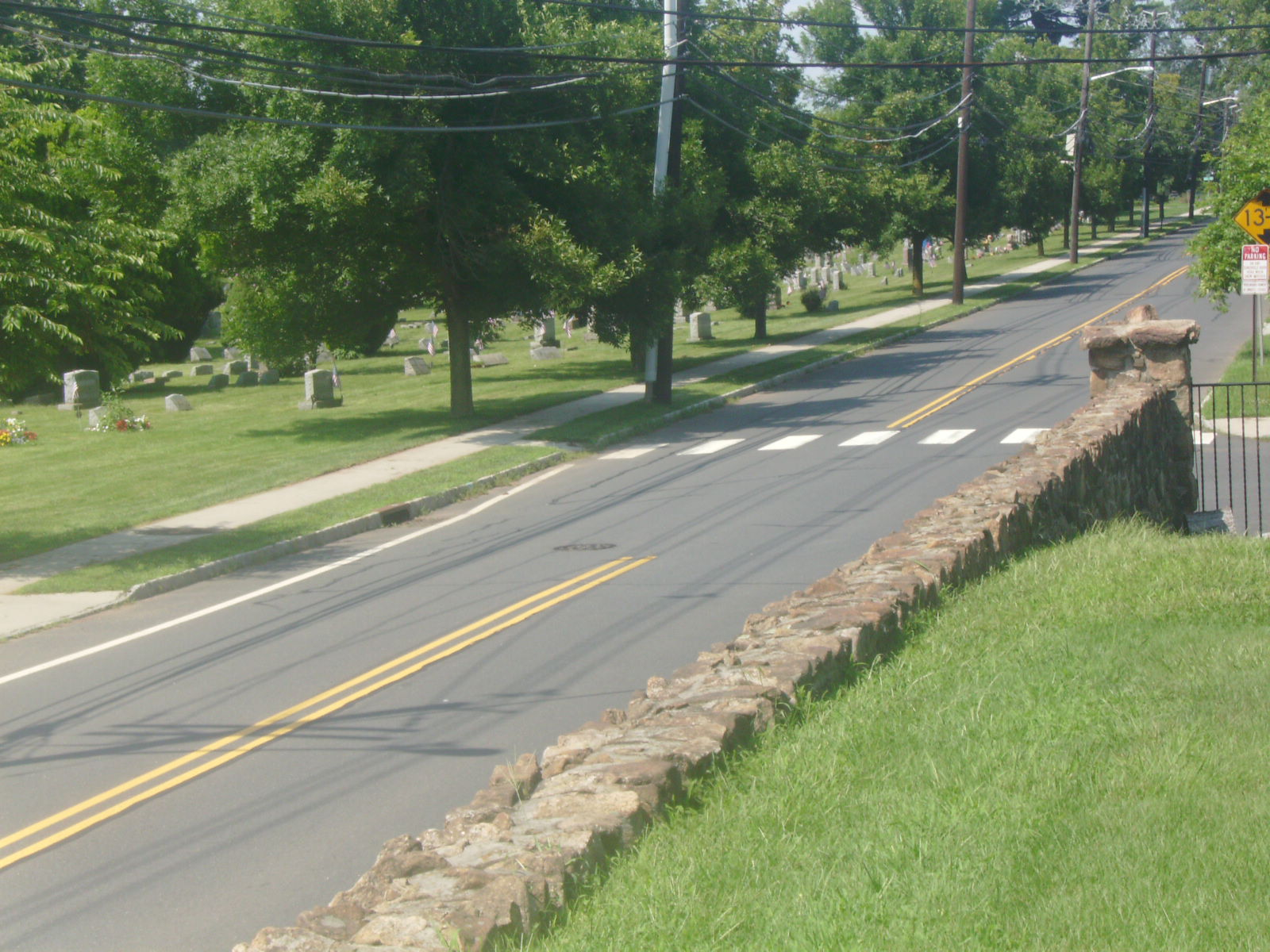
Route 177's former northern terminus at 5th Street viewed from Somerville Old Cemetery

Route 177 began at a traffic light intersection with U.S. Route 206 in the city of Somerville. At the intersection, southbound traffic on Route 206 had to use a jughandle to connect to Route 177. The state highway went northeastward, progressing along as South Bridge Street through a curve. Heading northward, the route passed the Somerville Old Cemetery before intersecting with Fifth Street. There, state-maintenance ended, and the designation of Route 177 terminated. Entering downtown Somerville, South Bridge Street continued northward into a large residential community. Passing to the east and west of several residential homes, South Bridge Street continued into the downtown portion, crossing the current-day Raritan Valley Line tracks maintained by New Jersey Transit and served the Somerville train station. After a couple of blocks of residential homes and businesses, South Bridge Street came to an intersection with New Jersey Route 28, where it switched to North Bridge Street.

== History ==
The alignment of Route 177 was a former alignment of State Highway Route 31 through Somerville. The highway was instated in 1926 as U.S. Route 206 and 1927 as State Highway Route 31 by the New Jersey State Highway Department and the Federal Highway Administration respectively. By 1930, Routes 206 and 31 was shifted off of Bridge Street, running along a partially completed bypass of Somerville. By 1938, this was completed and Route 206 was shifted to the southern terminus of Bridge Street south of the old cemetery. Bridge Street remained unnumbered until the second state highway renumbering on January 1, 1953. That day, the unnumbered alignment became Route 177, running from US 206 to Fifth Street, where it met US 206's former alignment. The route remained intact for a couple of decades, as one of three state highways in Somerset County (along with Route 28 and Route 27) until 1974, when the route was decommissioned and turned over to the borough of Somerville.

== Major intersections ==
The entire route was in Somerville, Somerset County.

mi	km	Destinations	Notes
0.00	0.00	US 206	Southern terminus
0.24	0.39	Fifth Street	Northern terminus
1.000 mi = 1.609 km; 1.000 km = 0.621 mi

== See also ==
- New Jersey Route 160
- New Jersey Route 170
