= Cass Street station =

Rail station in Trenton, New Jersey, US

Cass Street
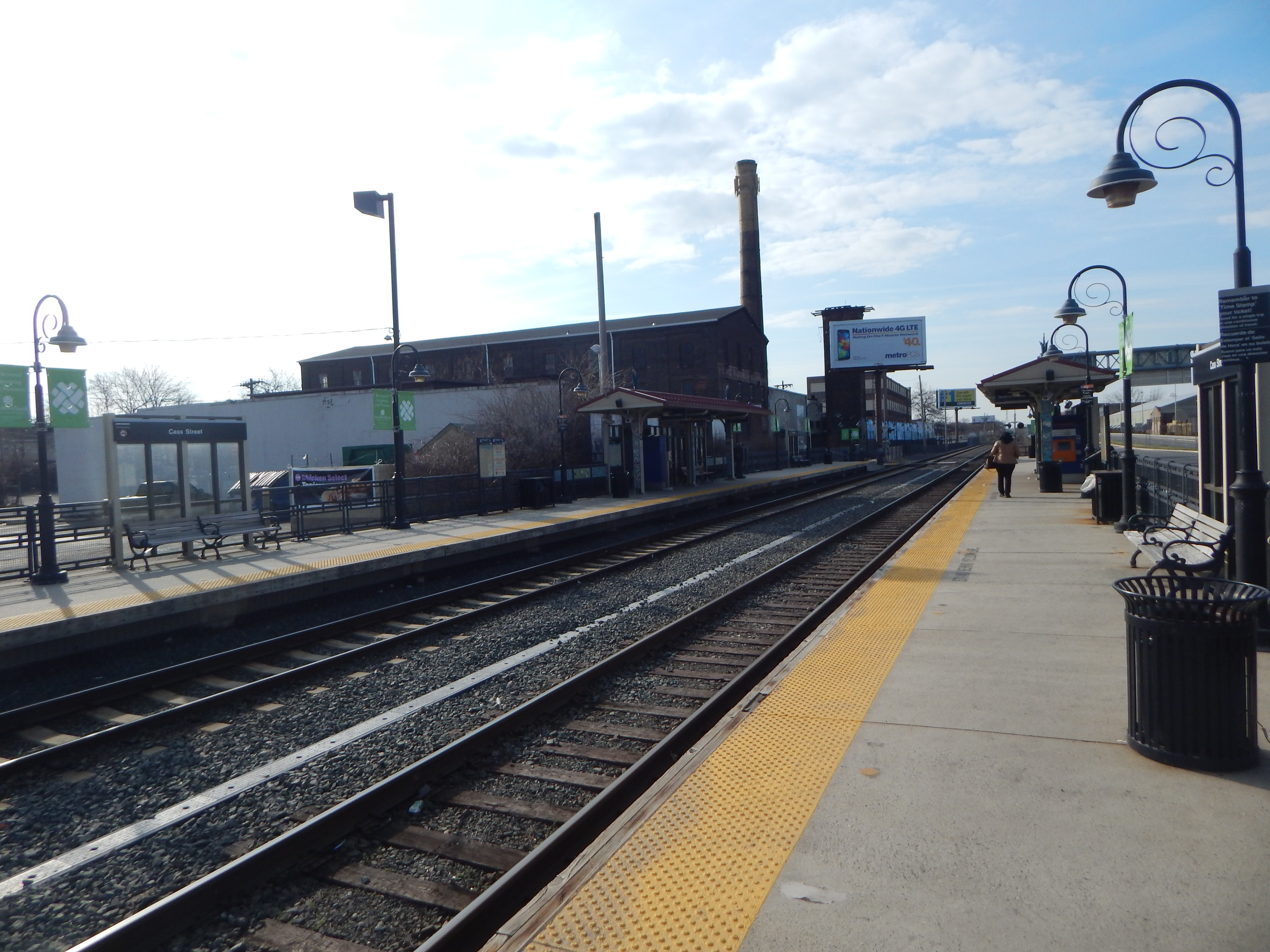
- Cass Street station in April 2015.

General information
- Location: Cass Street; Trenton, New Jersey
- Coordinates: 40°12′20″N 74°45′16″W
- Owner: New Jersey Transit
- Platforms: 2 side platforms
- Tracks: 2

Construction
- Accessible: yes

Other information
- Fare zone: 1

History
- Opened: March 15, 2004

Services
Preceding station	NJ Transit	Following station
Bordentown toward Entertainment Center	River Line	Hamilton Avenue toward Trenton
Location

Cass Street is a station on the River Line light rail system, located on Cass Street at Route 129 in Trenton, New Jersey. It is very nearly directly across Route 129 from New Jersey State Prison. Trenton Thunder Ballpark is located five blocks away down Cass Street, while both the Hamilton Avenue stop and CURE Insurance Arena are located a few blocks north on Route 129.

Southbound service from the station is available to the various stops along the New Jersey side of the Delaware River, terminating in Camden. Northbound service is available to the Trenton Transit Center.

The station opened on March 15, 2004, and is the southwesternmost River Line station in Trenton.
