= New Jersey Route 129 =

State highway in New Jersey, US

Route 129
- Canal Boulevard

Route information
- Auxiliary route of Route 29
- Maintained by NJDOT
- Length: 2.41 mi (3.88 km)
- Existed: September 1993–present

Major junctions
- South end: Lamberton Road in Hamilton
- Route 29 in Hamilton; US 206 in Trenton
- North end: US 1 in Trenton

Location
- Country: United States
- State: New Jersey
- Counties: Mercer

Highway system
- New Jersey State Highway Routes; Interstate; US; State; Scenic Byways
← Route 124	→ US 130

Route 129 is a north–south expressway in the capital city of Trenton, New Jersey. The highway runs along Canal Boulevard through portions of Trenton, serving as an alternative highway to its parent, Route 29. The route begins at an intersection with South Lamberton Road in Hamilton Township, and heads northward along NJ Transit's River Line until terminating at an interchange with U.S. Route 1 (US 1; the Trenton Freeway).

The original use of Route 129 opened in 1961 on what is now Interstate 295 (I-295) from the Scudder Falls Bridge to Scotch Road in Trenton. The route was replaced in 1974 by I-95 (re-designated as I-295 in 2018), while the route's current incarnation opened in September 1993 along a former portion of the Delaware and Raritan Canal. The route has remained virtually untouched since its opening.

== Route description ==
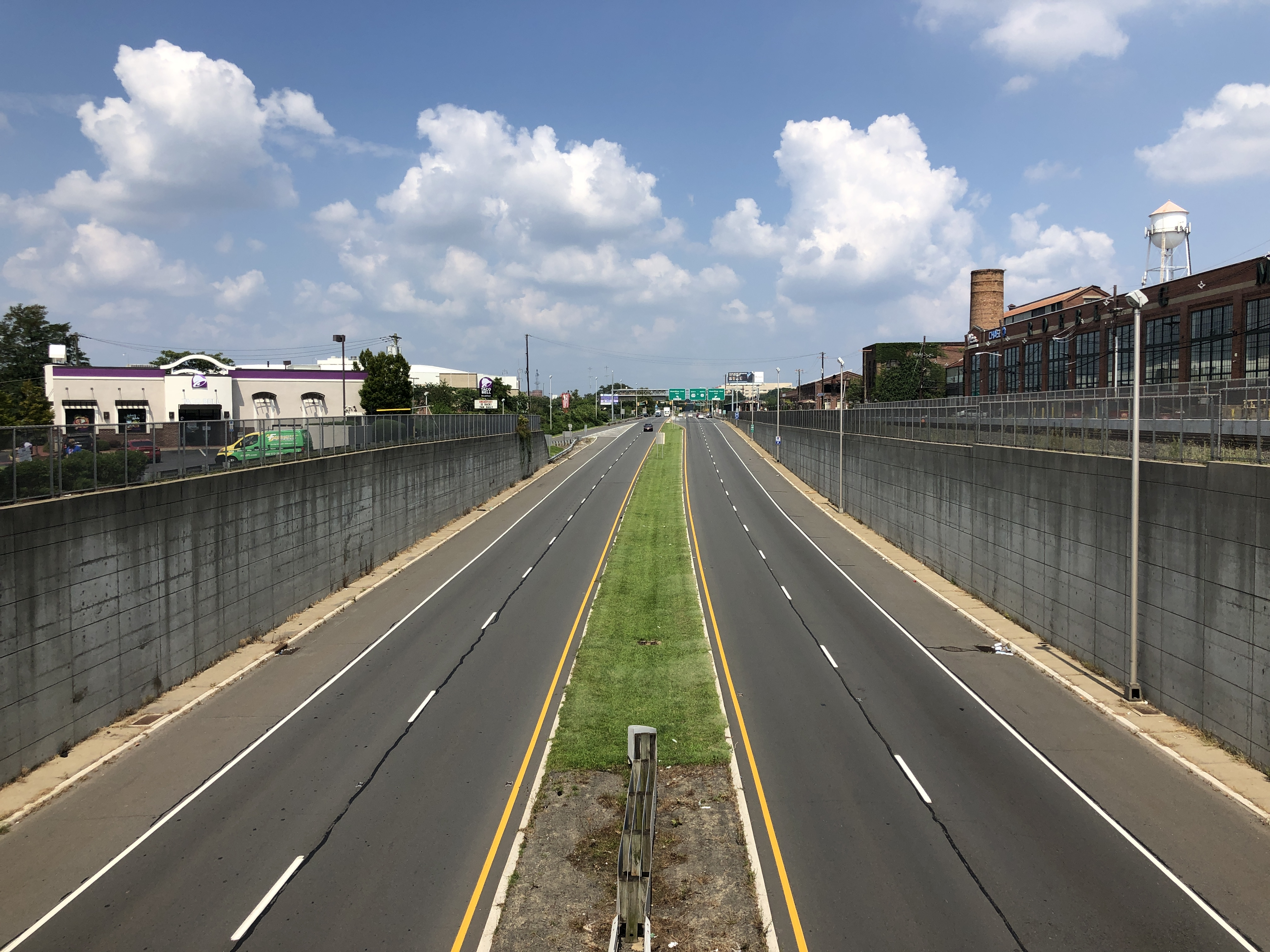
Route 129 northbound at South Broad Street in Trenton

Route 129 begins at an intersection with South Lamberton Road on the Delaware River in Hamilton Township. The highway proceeds northward as a two-lane divided freeway, passing through small fields and tree patches until reaching NJ Transit's River Line, where the route turns to the northwest, paralleling its parent, the Route 29 freeway to the west. Route 129 then intersects an onramp to Route 29 and passes to the east of a large factory. From there, the highway merges back together and comes upon a partial interchange with Route 29. Route 129 itself continues along the railroad tracks on Canal Boulevard, entering the city of Trenton, where it becomes a four-lane freeway.

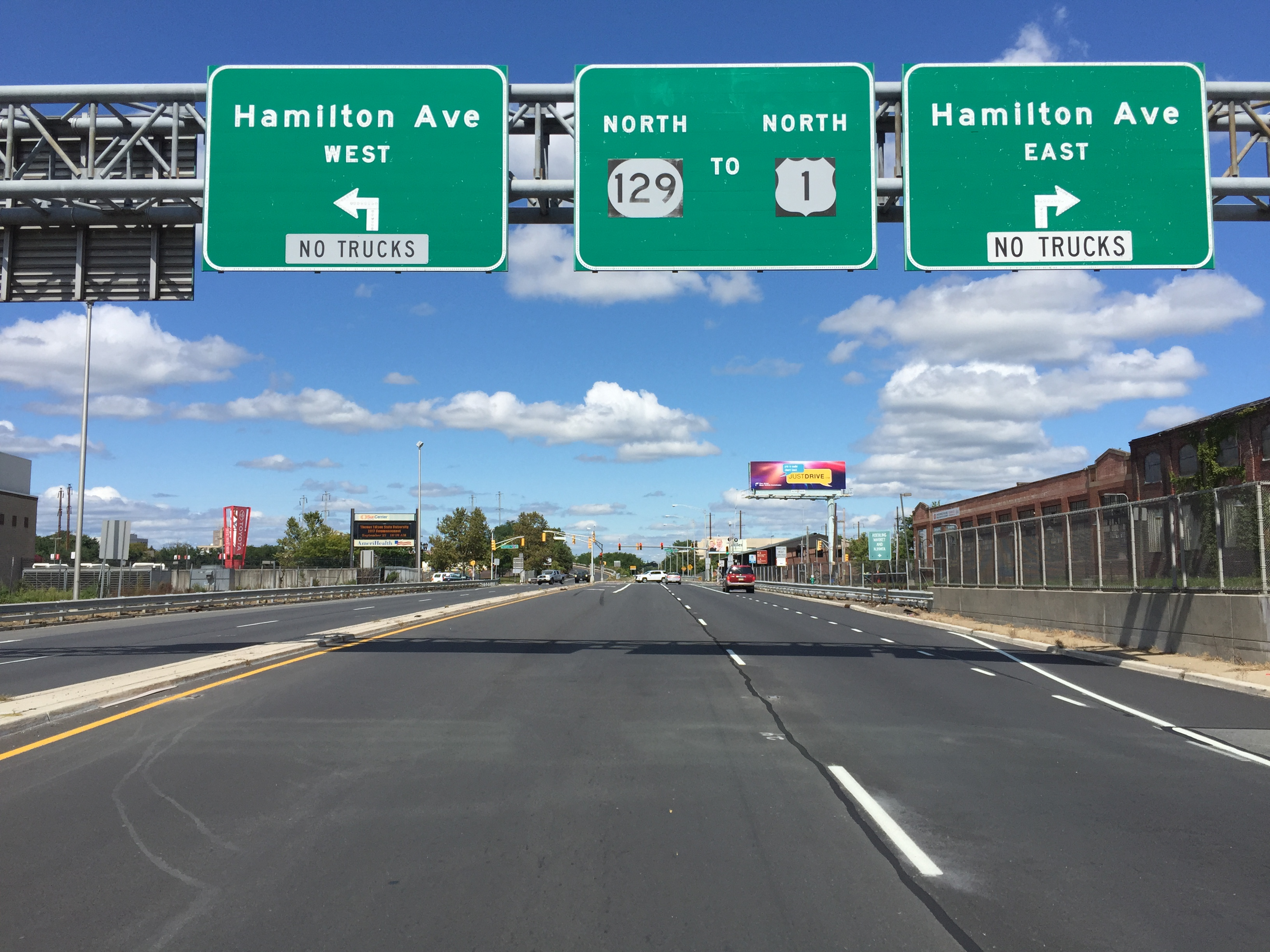
View north along Route 129 at Hamilton Avenue in Trenton

At an intersection with Mercer County Route 650 (Lalor Street), Route 129 develops a grassy median and heads along the industrial portion of the city as a four-lane expressway. With NJ Transit's River Line paralleling the highway, the state road serves access to large factories, a large residential district and Cass Street station along the River Line between Lalor Street and Cass Street. Route 129 continues northward along Canal, crossing under US 206 (South Broad Street) with a southbound exit to that road before passing east of CURE Insurance Arena. It crosses Hamilton Avenue north of the Hamilton Avenue station serving the light rail line before passing over Amtrak's Northeast Corridor railroad line and reaching an interchange with US 1, where Route 129 ends and Canal Boulevard's right of way merges into the Trenton Freeway. This interchange has access to northbound US 1 and from southbound US 1, westbound Route 33, and Market Street.

== History ==
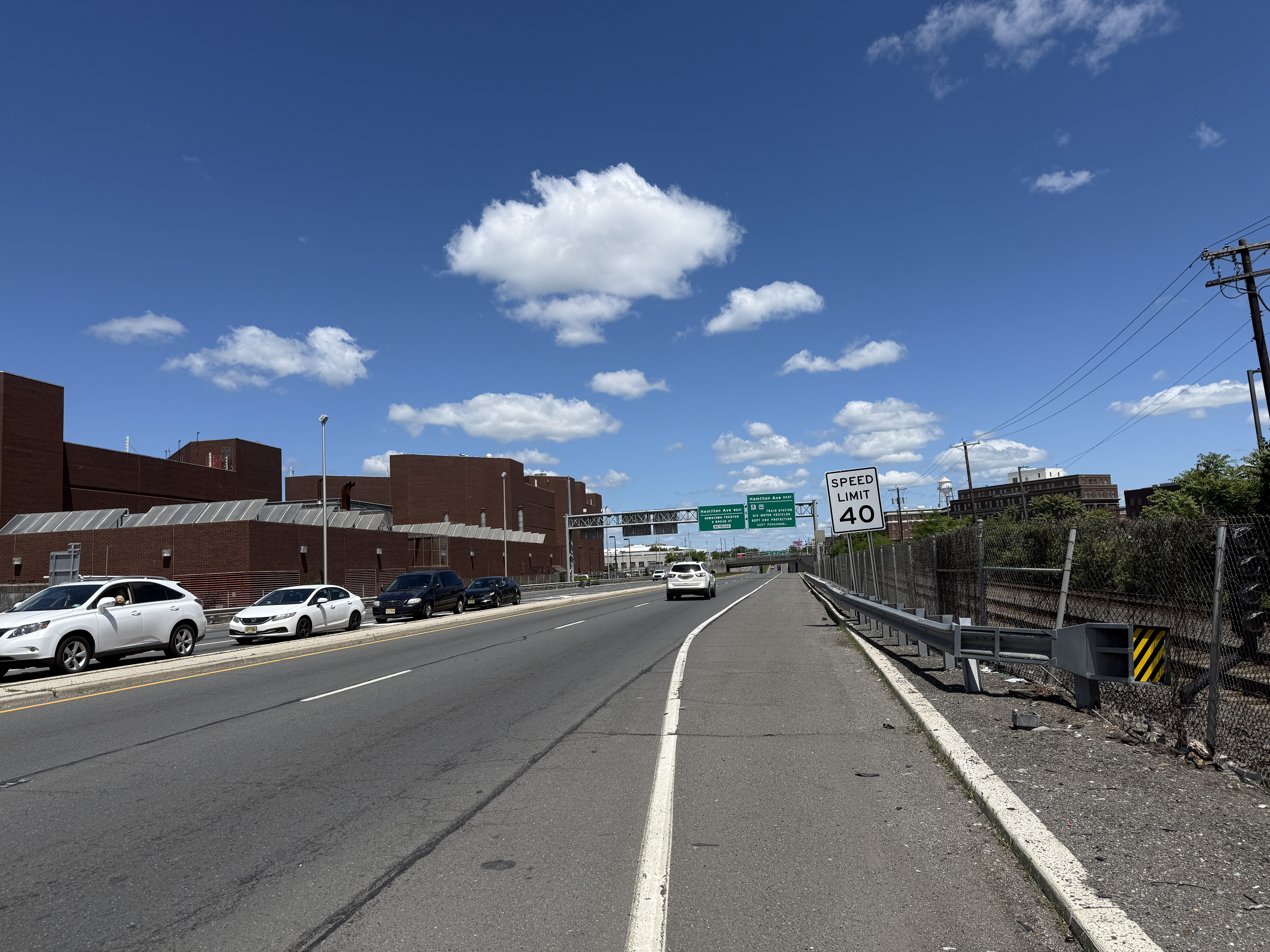
Route 129 northbound past Cass Street in Trenton

Route 129 originates as the earliest designation on a freeway from the Scudder Falls Bridge on the Delaware River to the interchange with Scotch Road, which opened in 1961. At that point, the new freeway was proposed with an eastward extension to US 1. However, by 1974, Route 129 was re-designated as a portion of I-95, and is now designated as I-295. The current incarnation of Route 129 was constructed along a former portion of the Delaware and Raritan Canal as an alternate arterial boulevard to Route 29 that opened in September 1993 from South Lamberton Road to US 1 at a cost of $24.185 million (1993 USD) by the George Harms Construction Company. The route has remained virtually untouched since.

== Exit list ==
The entire route is in Mercer County. All exits are unnumbered.

Location	mi	km	Destinations	Notes
Hamilton Township	0.00	0.00	South Lamberton Road	Southern terminus; at-grade intersection
Hamilton Township	0.59	0.95	Route 29 south to I-195 east / I-295 – Shore Points, Camden	Southbound exit and northbound entrance
Trenton			Northern end of freeway section	
Trenton	1.87	3.01	South Broad Street (US 206) – Chambersburg	Southbound exit only
Trenton	2.41	3.88	US 1 north	Northern terminus
1.000 mi = 1.609 km; 1.000 km = 0.621 mi: Incomplete access
