= New Jersey Route 29 =

Highway in New Jersey

Route 29
- Route 29 labelled in red (Section co-designated with Route 165 backed in blue)

Route information
- Maintained by NJDOT and Hunterdon County
- Length: 34.76 mi (55.94 km)
- Existed: 1927–present
- Tourist routes: Delaware River Scenic Byway
- Restrictions: Hazmats, bottled gas, and trucks over 13 tons GVWR prohibited in South Trenton Tunnel

Major junctions
- South end: I-195 / I-295 in Hamilton Township
- Route 129 in Hamilton Township; US 1 in Trenton; Route 175 in Ewing Township; I-295 in Ewing Township; Route 179 in Lambertville; US 202 in Delaware Township
- North end: Route 12 in Frenchtown

Location
- Country: United States
- State: New Jersey
- Counties: Mercer, Hunterdon

Highway system
- New Jersey State Highway Routes; Interstate; US; State; Scenic Byways
← Route 28	→ US 30
← Route 164	Route 165	→ Route 166

Route 29 is a state highway in the U.S. state of New Jersey. Signed north-south, it runs 34.76 miles (55.94 km) from an interchange with Interstate 295 (I-295) in Hamilton Township in Mercer County, where the road continues east as I-195, northwest to Route 12 (Bridge Street / Race Street) in Frenchtown, Hunterdon County. Between the southern terminus and I-295 in Ewing Township, the route is a mix of expressway and boulevard that runs along the Delaware River through Trenton. This section includes a truck-restricted tunnel that was built along the river near historic houses and Riverview Cemetery. North of I-295, Route 29 turns into a scenic and mostly two-lane highway. North of the South Trenton Tunnel, it is designated the Delaware River Scenic Byway, a New Jersey Scenic Byway and National Scenic Byway, that follows the Delaware River in mostly rural sections of Mercer County and Hunterdon County. The obsolete Delaware & Raritan Canal usually stands between the river and the highway. Most sections of this portion of Route 29 are completely shaded due to the tree canopy. Route 29 also has a spur, Route 129, which connects Route 29 to U.S. Route 1 (US 1) in Trenton.

Route 29 was initially designated in 1927 to run from downtown Trenton northeast to Newark, following present-day Route 179 and US 202 between Lambertville and Somerville and US 22 between Somerville and Newark. The route between Lambertville and Frenchtown was originally Route 29A. In 1953, Route 29 was shifted to follow the alignment of Route 29A to avoid the concurrencies with the U.S. Routes. Route 29 between South Warren Street in Trenton and I-95 (now I-295) in Ewing Township was upgraded to a four-lane expressway, with a portion of freeway, in the 1950s and 1960s. In 1995, the southern freeway part of Route 29 between I-195/I-295 and Route 129 in Hamilton Township was completed. This freeway section was linked to the rest of Route 29 by a tunnel completed in 2002. A realignment of Route 29 in Lambertville by the 2000s made the route concurrent with the entire length of 0.26-mile-long (0.42 km) Route 165.

== Route description ==
=== Mercer County ===
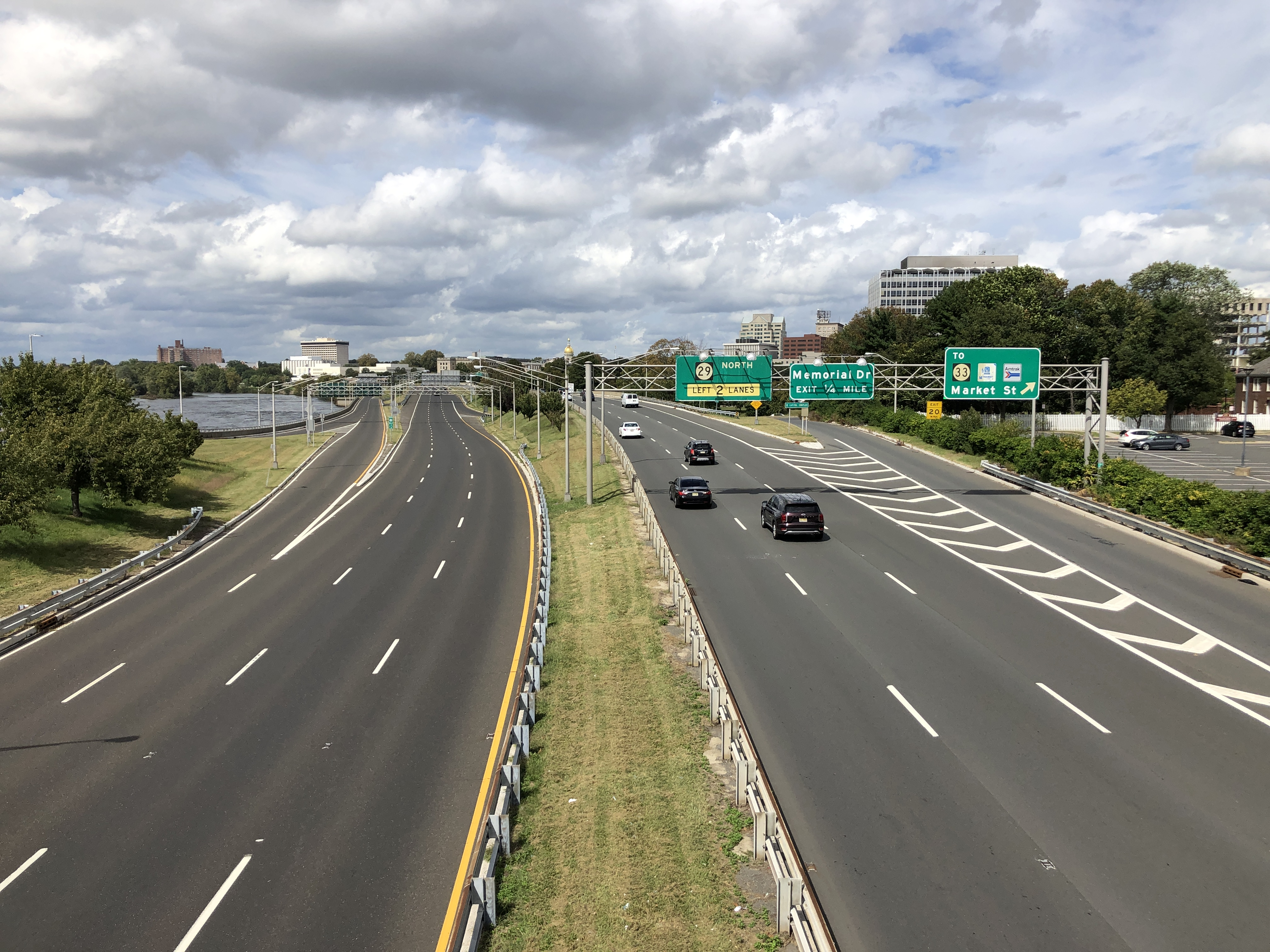
Route 29 northbound through downtown Trenton, with the Delaware River on the left

Route 29 begins at a modified cloverleaf interchange with I-195 and I-295 in Hamilton Township, and it serves as the western continuation of I-195, heading to the northwest as a six-lane freeway. The route has an interchange with Route 129, a spur of Route 29 which connects to US 1. At this interchange, the route passes over NJ Transit's River Line. Route 29 narrows to four lanes past this interchange and crosses into Trenton. The route comes to a southbound exit and entrance for Lamberton Road. At this point, Route 29 becomes the Delaware River Scenic Byway, a state scenic byway that was also designated a National Scenic Byway in 2009. Route 29 runs along the bank of the Delaware River and enters a truck-restricted tunnel that passes by historic houses and Riverview Cemetery. Within this tunnel, Route 29 features a southbound exit and northbound entrance for Lalor Street. The route emerges from the tunnel and passes east of Trenton Thunder Ballpark, the home ballpark of the Trenton Thunder baseball team. The road becomes a six-lane expressway known as John Fitch Way at a traffic light at Thunder Road/Cass Street. Route 29 meets South Warren Street at another traffic light. The median widens and it becomes a six-lane freeway, passing under the Morrisville–Trenton Railroad Bridge, which carries Amtrak's Northeast Corridor over the Delaware River.

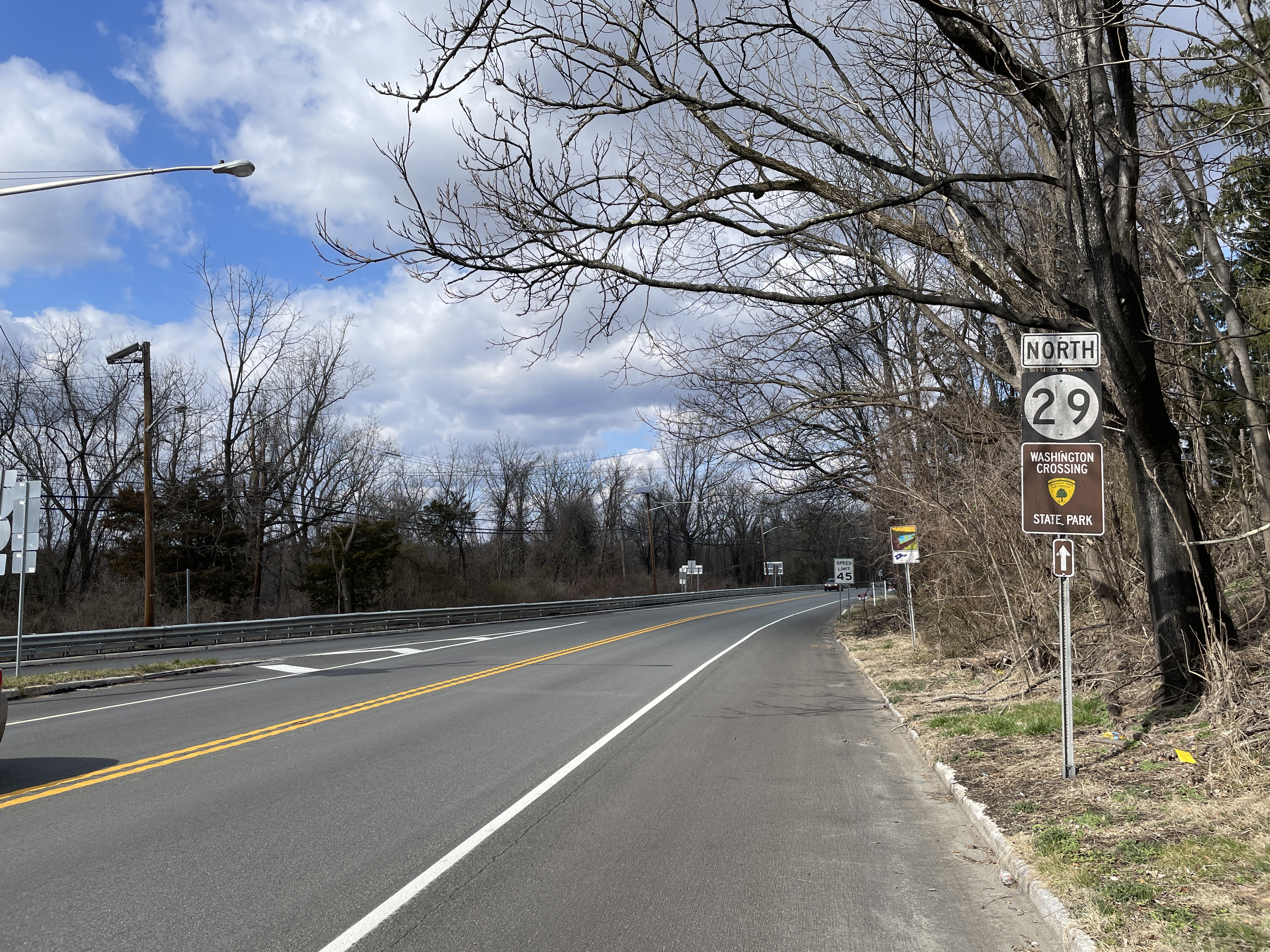
Route 29 northbound past northern terminus of Route 175 in Ewing Township

Route 29 passes under the Trenton–Morrisville Toll Bridge, which carries US 1 over the Delaware River. Access to US 1 south is provided by ramps from Route 29 while access to Route 29 from US 1 north is provided by South Warren Street. Route 29 passes under the Lower Trenton Bridge and the median narrows again. It interchanges with Market Street, which provides access to Route 33, and then features an interchange with Memorial Drive which provides access to the New Jersey State House with a northbound exit and southbound entrance. Route 29 crosses the Assunpink Creek and features an interchange which provides access to South Warren Street with exits in both directions but only a northbound entrance. Route 29 continues to a cloverleaf interchange with Calhoun Street (County Route 653, CR 653), which provides access to the Calhoun Street Bridge over the Delaware River, where it narrows to four lanes. Riverside Avenue exits as a frontage road paralleling the northbound lanes of Route 29 before the road features a northbound exit for Hermitage Avenue. Route 29 comes to a partial interchange with Parkside Avenue, with a northbound exit and southbound entrance, and then features a northbound exit for South Eastfield Avenue.

Route 29 becomes a four-lane boulevard at the intersection with Lee Avenue, where it continues northwest along the Delaware River. The route meets the southern terminus of CR 579 (Sullivan Way). The median widens again and then narrows as the route meets the southern terminus of Route 175, a former alignment of Route 29 that currently serves as a frontage road. Route 29 becomes a four-lane expressway known as Daniel Bray Highway before crossing into Ewing Township. It passes under the West Trenton Railroad Bridge, which carries CSX's Trenton Subdivision and SEPTA's West Trenton Line over the Delaware River. Route 29 intersects Route 175 again and then comes to a complex interchange with I-295, with the ramps within the median of Route 29, just to the east of the Scudder Falls Bridge.

Upon crossing the Delaware and Raritan Canal, Route 29 becomes a two-lane surface road known as River Road. It continues along the Delaware River, next to the Delaware and Raritan Canal, which runs between Route 29 and the river. The route intersects the northern terminus of Route 175. Farther north, Route 29 enters Hopewell Township and continues into a more rural setting shaded with trees. Route 29 heads to Washington Crossing State Park, where it intersects CR 546, which heads east on Washington Crossing-Pennington Road, and the approach to the Washington Crossing Bridge, which continues into Pennsylvania and connects to Pennsylvania Route 532 (PA 532). Route 29 continues north along the Delaware River through Titusville, passing by Washington Crossing State Park.

=== Hunterdon County ===
Route 165
- Location: Lambertville
- Length: 0.26 mi (420 m)

Route 29 crosses into West Amwell Township in Hunterdon County. It enters Lambertville, where Route 29 becomes a four-lane divided highway. At the intersection of South Main Street, Route 29 becomes concurrent with Route 165. The route becomes an undivided highway again and meets the western terminus of CR 518 (Brunswick Street). It meets Route 179 (Bridge Street), where Route 165 ends and Route 29 turns west for a one-block wrong-way concurrency with the two-lane, undivided Route 179, lasting to the intersection of Main Street, where Route 29 turns north on Main Street.

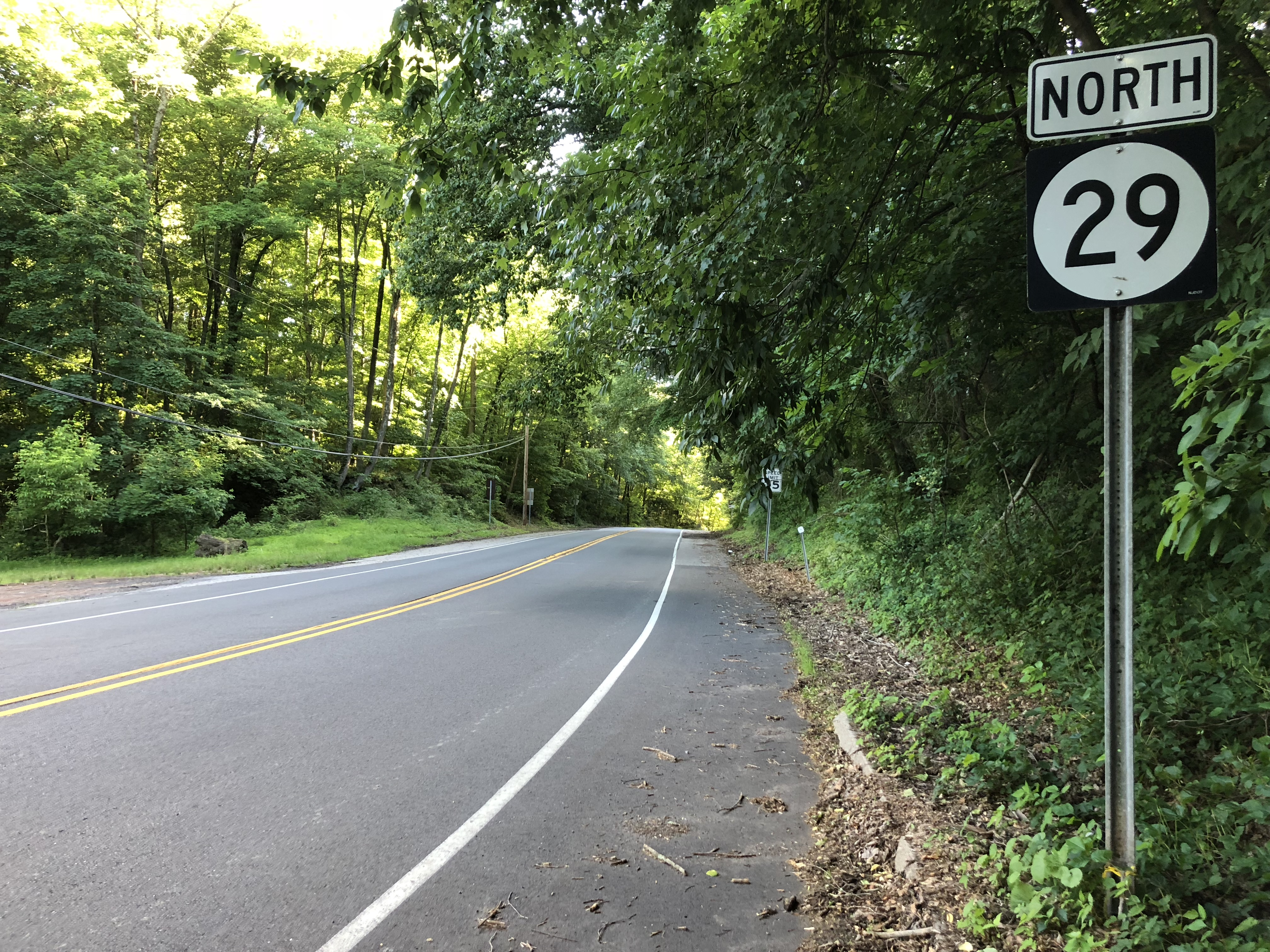
Route 29 northbound past CR 519 in Delaware Township

Route 29 follows Main Street north through Lambertville, crossing into Delaware Township. It comes to an interchange with US 202 just east of the New Hope–Lambertville Toll Bridge, with access to northbound US 202 and from southbound US 202 provided by way of Alexauken Creek Road. Route 29 continues along the Delaware River and enters Stockton. The route intersects Bridge Street, which crosses the Delaware River on the Centre Bridge–Stockton Bridge and continues into Pennsylvania as PA 263. Shortly after that intersection, Route 29 intersects the southern terminus of CR 523 (Stockton-Flemington Road). Route 29 crosses back into Delaware Township, where it meets the southern terminus of CR 519 (Kingwood-Stockton Road).

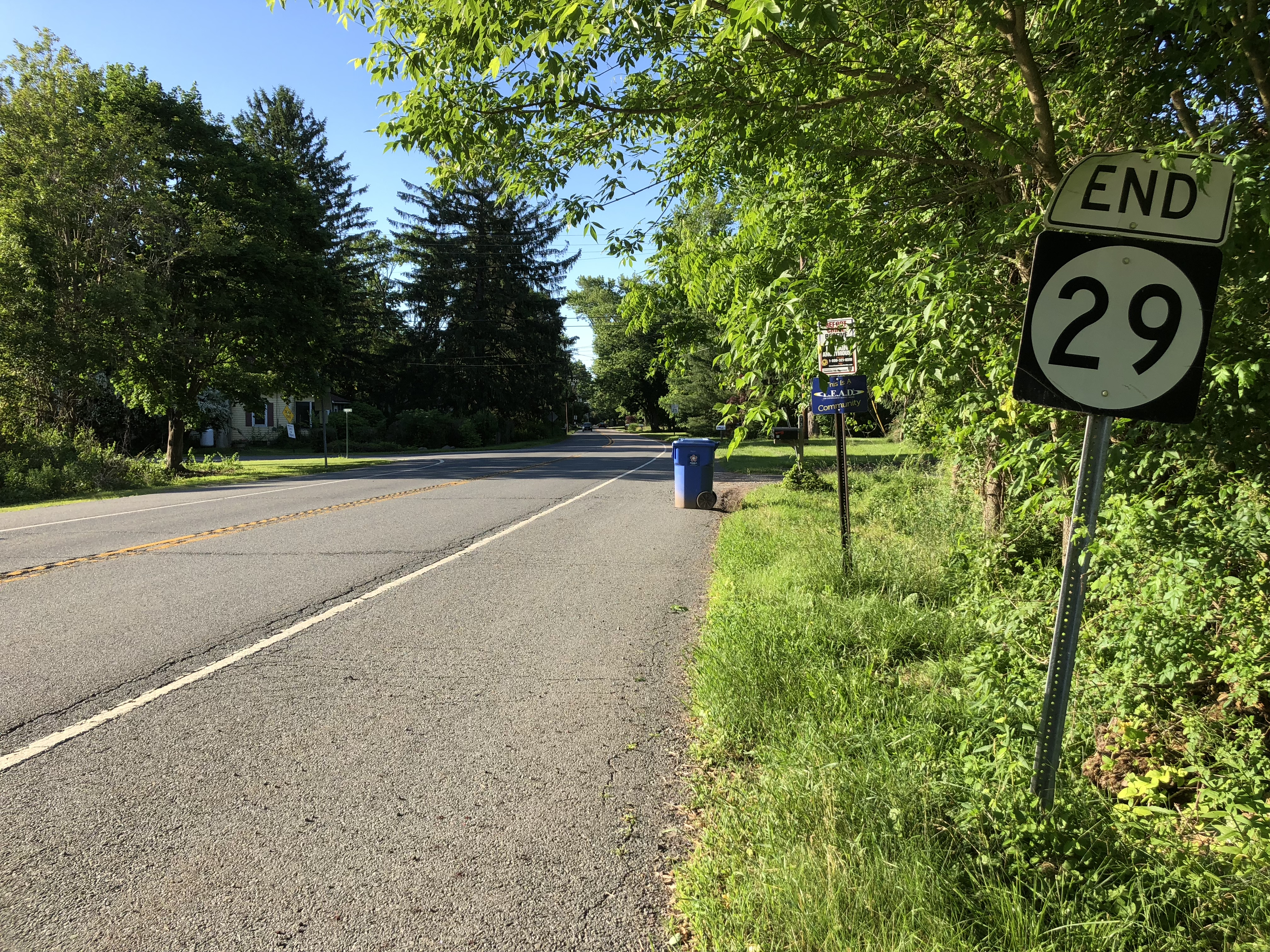
Route 29's mis-signed northern terminus when entering Frenchtown. Route 29 continues to Frenchtown and Route 12 despite the signage.

Route 29 makes a sharp left turn and heads west along the river as a rural road, crossing into Kingwood Township, where the name of the road changes from Main Street to Daniel Bray Highway. Here, it intersects with CR 651 (Byram-Kingwood Road). The route bends to the north and continues along the Delaware River for several miles, crossing into Frenchtown, where the route becomes Trenton Road. Upon entering Frenchtown, an end shield for northbound Route 29 is posted to mark the end of state maintenance, which officially ends at the Washington Street intersection, where maintenance is transferred to the county. Despite this, Route 29 officially continues farther north along Trenton Road to its northern terminus at Route 12 (Bridge Street/Race Street), a short distance east of Route 12’s western terminus at the Uhlerstown–Frenchtown Bridge. The southern terminus of CR 513 is located a block north of the northern terminus of Route 29 along Route 12.

== History ==
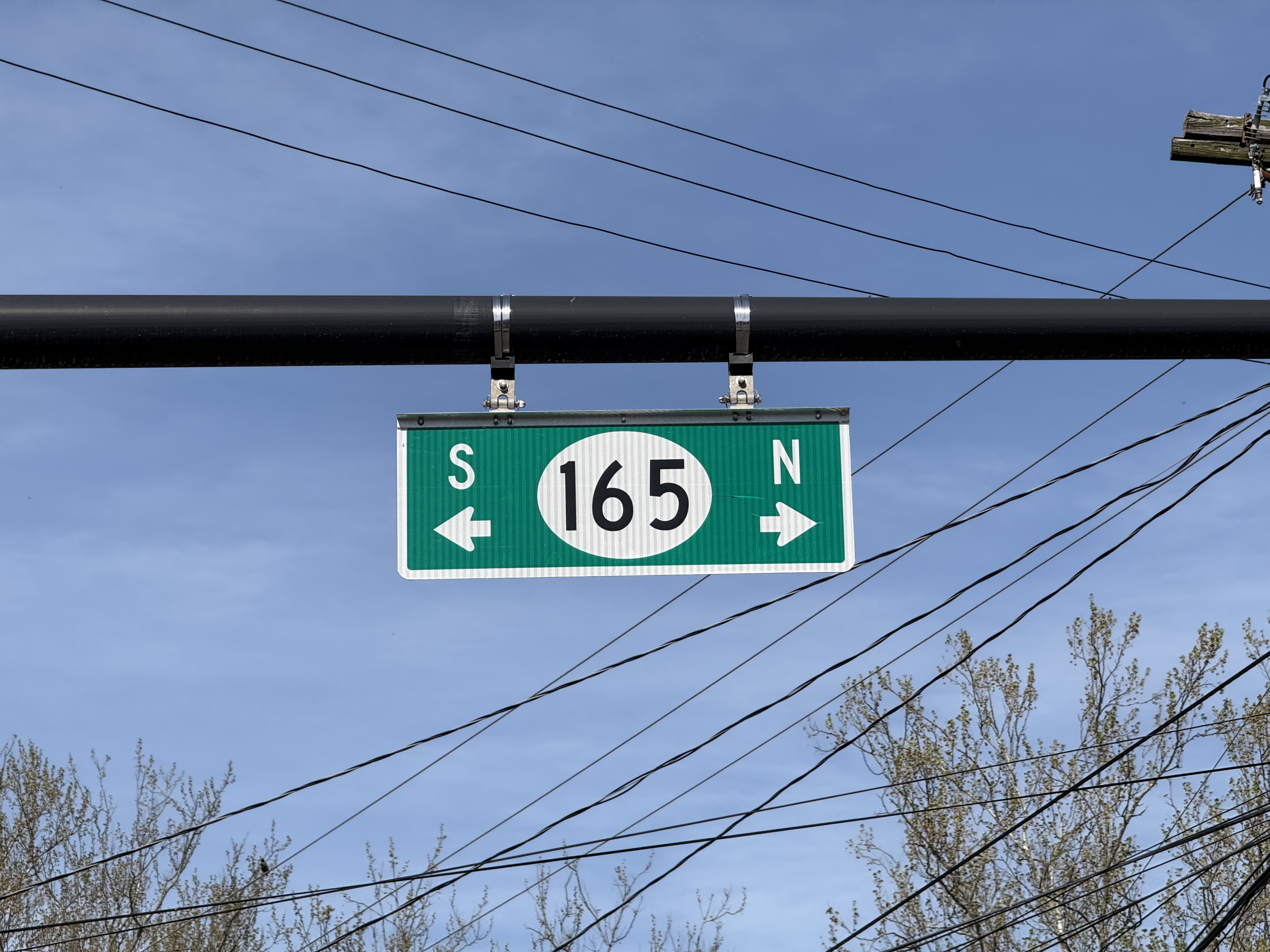
Overhead sign for Route 165 in Lambertville

The current route was originally legislated in 1911 as part of the Delaware River Drive, a named state highway that was proposed to run from along the Delaware River from Trenton north to the New York border in Montague Township. Route 29 was originally defined in 1927 to run from Trenton to Newark. The original route ran from downtown Trenton along State Street and Sanhican Drive. From there, it followed its current alignment to Lambertville, where it followed present-day Route 179 to Ringoes to present-day CR 514, which it followed to Woods Tavern. The route turned north on US 206 (also designated Route 31) and followed that route to Somerville, where it followed US 22 to Newark. The current alignment of Route 29 from Lambertville to Route 12 in Frenchtown was designated Route 29A in 1927.

Route 29A
- Location: Lambertville–Frenchtown
- Existed: 1927–1953

The alignment of Route 29 between Ringoes and Somerville was eventually shifted to follow present-day US 202, which was also Route 30 (now Route 31) between Ringoes and Flemington and Route 12 between Flemington and Somerville. In 1938, Route 29B was planned as an extension of Route 29A from Frenchtown to Route 28 (now Route 122) in Alpha. While this road was never built, much of the alignment north of Milford is served by CR 519. In 1948, a spur route, Route S29, was created, running along US 202 (Bridge Street) in Lambertville to the New Hope–Lambertville Bridge.

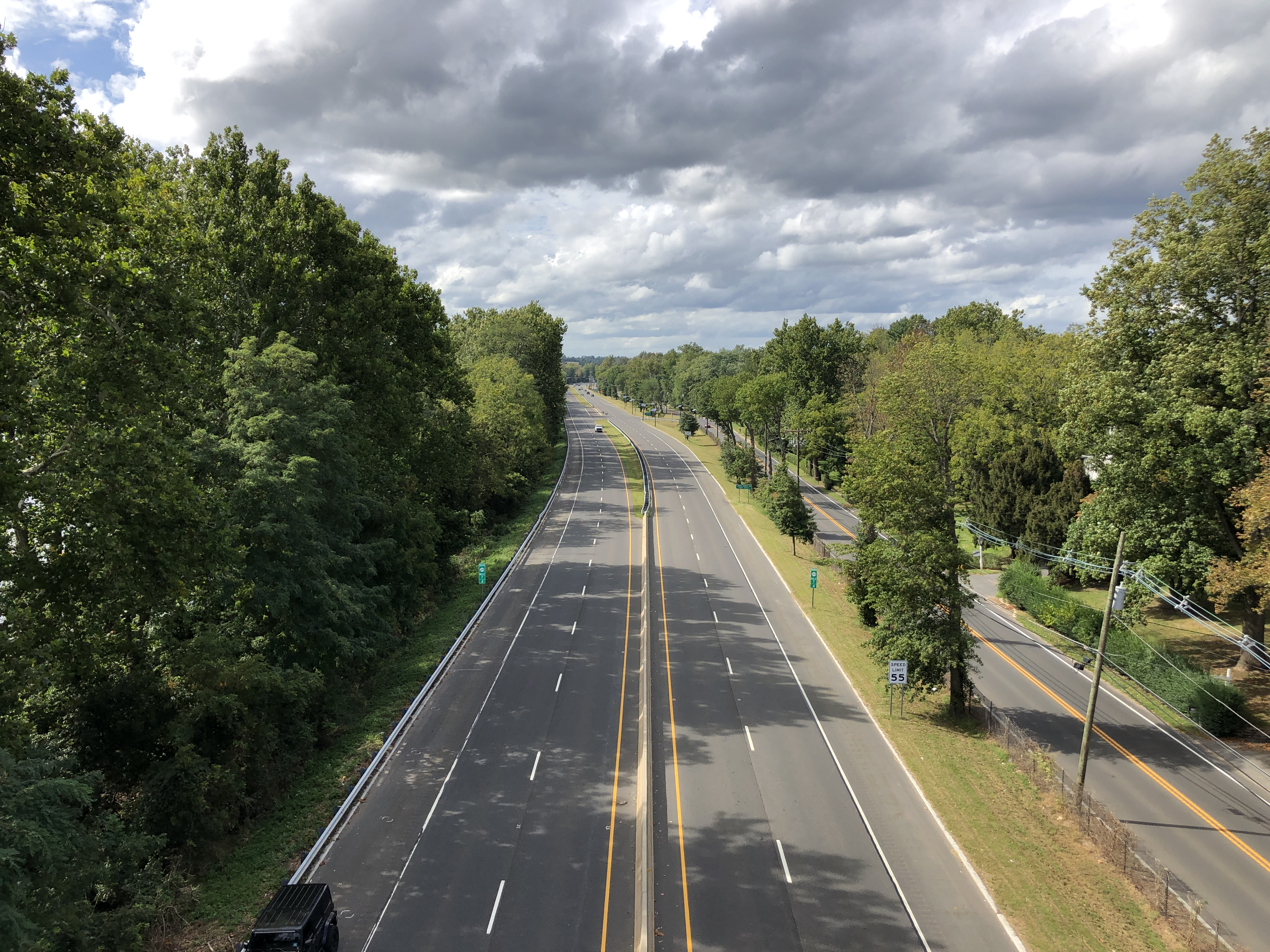
View northbound along Route 29 from the West Trenton Railroad Bridge in Ewing, with Route 175 visible to the right

In the 1953 New Jersey state highway renumbering, Route 29 was redefined to continue north from Lambertville to Frenchtown on Route 29A, and the Route 29 designation between Lambertville and Newark was removed in favor of US 202 between Lambertville and Somerville and US 22 between Somerville and Newark. The section of former Route 29 between Route 29A and Route S29 became Route 165.

Plans for a limited-access route along the Route 29 corridor go back to 1932, when a parkway was proposed along the Delaware River between Trenton and Lambertville; this proposal never materialized. Plans to construct a freeway from Hamilton Township to I-95 (now I-295) in Ewing Township were resurrected in the early 1950s. This road was built between 1954 and 1957 from South Warren Street in Trenton to present-day I-295 in Ewing Township. From just south of Calhoun Street north to I-295, Route 29 utilized the right-of-way of what remained of the Trenton Water Power Canal, a 19th century waterway utilized by the mills of Trenton for water power. The freeway's construction resulted in the filling of the canal, and also took up much of Trenton’s available waterfront along the Delaware River, destroying a Stacy Park, a major waterfront park, despite protests, which contributed to the population decline and economic impoverishment of Trenton over the ensuing decades. The former alignment of Route 29 in the northern part of Trenton and in Ewing Township became Route 175.

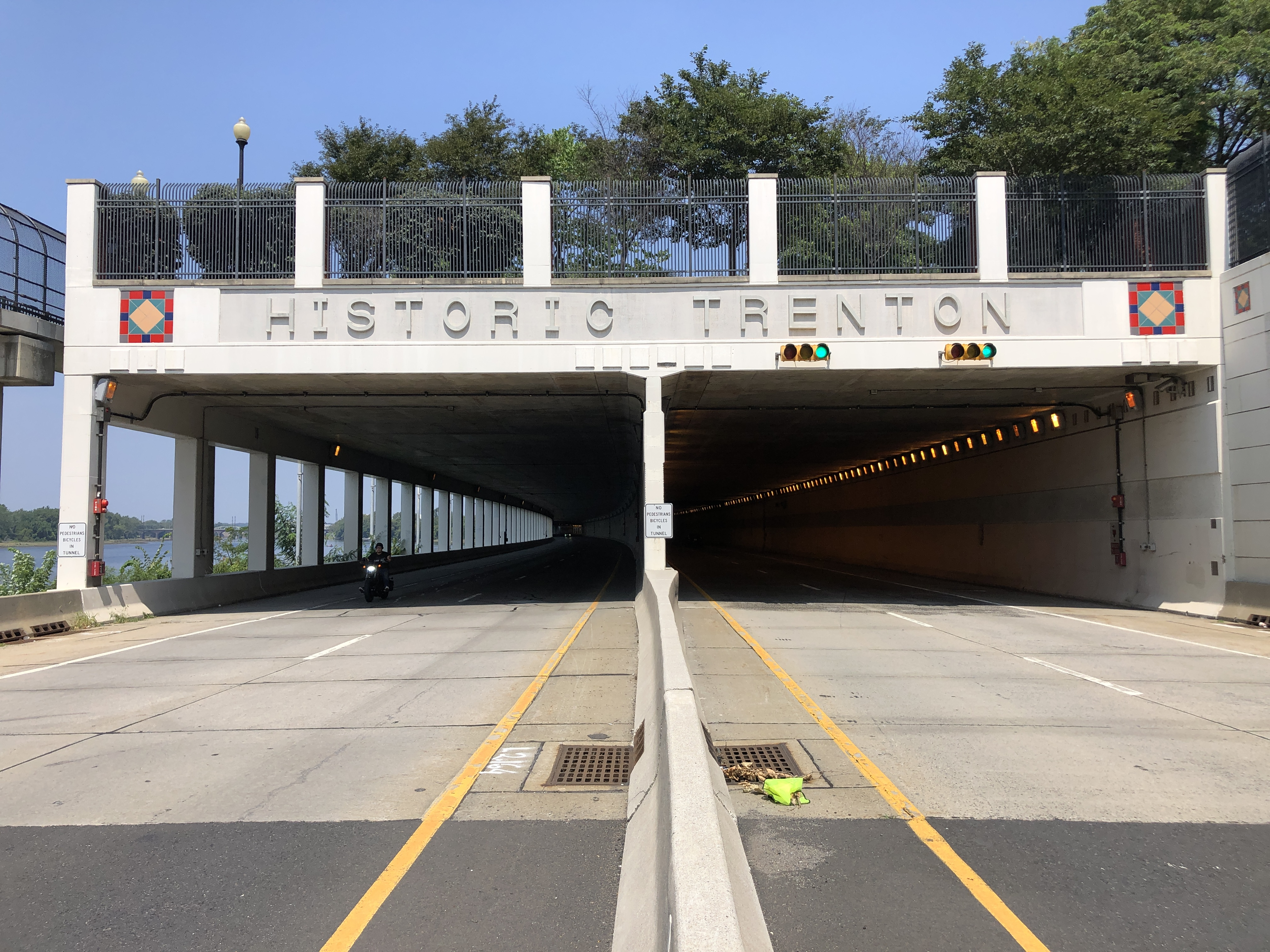
Southern portal of the South Trenton Tunnel

Between 1990 and 1995, the Route 29 freeway was built between the I-195/I-295 interchange and Route 129 in Hamilton Township. A two-lane street, Lamberton Road, connected the two freeway sections. Plans were then made to fill the gap between the two freeway sections in Trenton. Construction began in 1997 on the Route 29 freeway between Route 129 and the Morrisville–Trenton Railroad Bridge. The road was to include two traffic lights at Cass Street and South Warren Street and a tunnel which was to be built as a covered roadway on the bank of the Delaware River. The tunnel was originally scheduled to be complete by 2001 but was delayed after the Army Corps of Engineers discovered many environmental violations that occurred with construction of the tunnel. The roof was put in place in October 2001 and the tunnel officially opened to traffic on March 2, 2002. A restriction to trucks over 13 tons was put in place and made permanent in November 2002.

By the 2000s, the state gave the part of Route 29 (South Main Street) between Route 165 and Route 179 in Lambertville to the city, and Route 29 was rerouted to use all of Route 165 and one block of Route 179. Prior to this, South Main Street had been turned one-way southbound. Route 165, which is only signed on overhead street signs, still exists, though it is fully concurrent with Route 29.

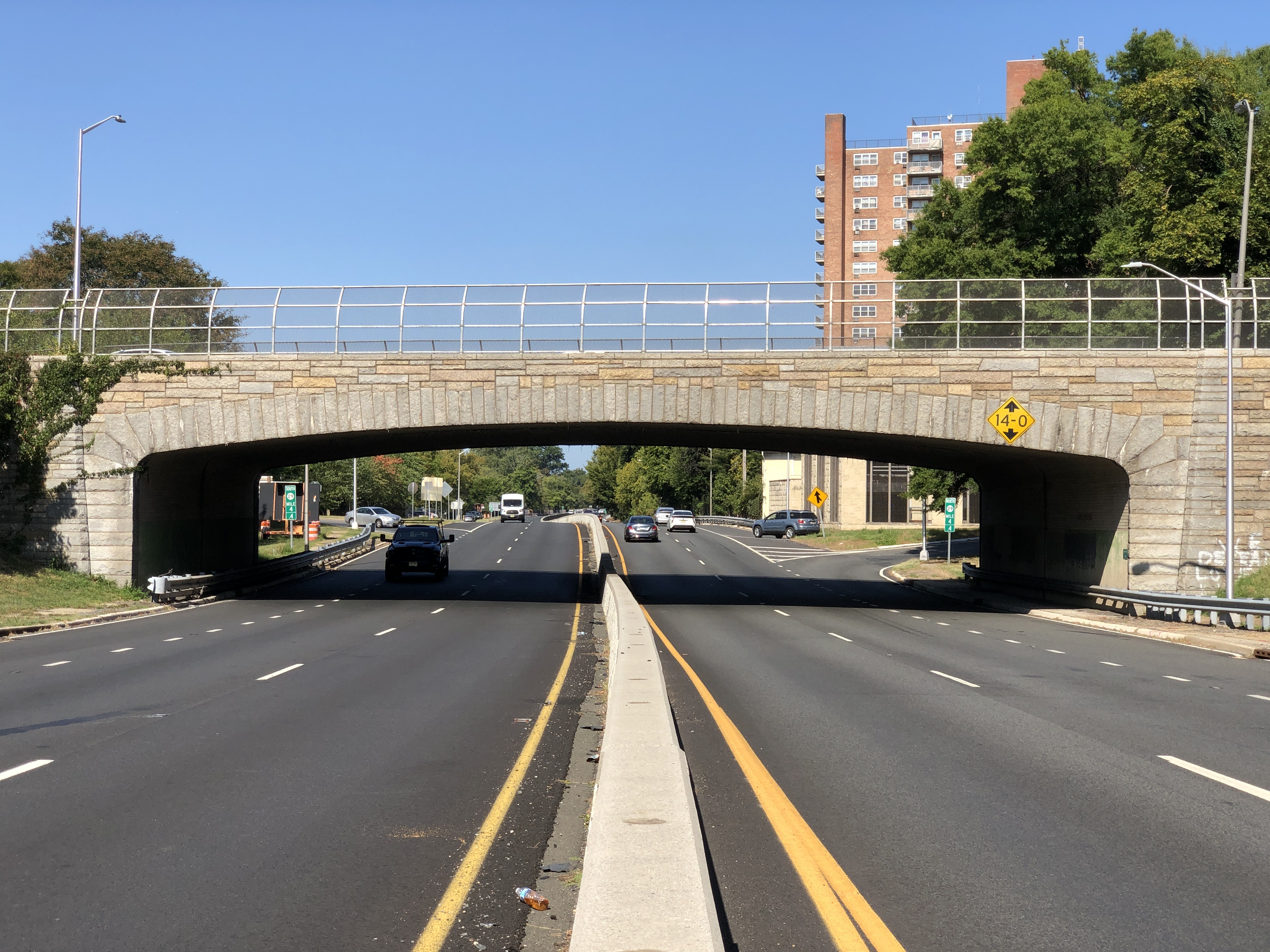
A single stone-faced overpass at Calhoun Street is the only hint of Route 29's designation as a parkway

A part of Route 29 was designated in 1959 as the John Fitch Parkway, honoring inventor John Fitch, "beginning with the bridge crossing over the Assunpink Creek at the conjunction of Factory Street with John Fitch Way in the city of Trenton and including the traffic circle surrounding the War Memorial building and the freeway extending in a westerly direction therefrom, along the bank of the Delaware river, to the city line of the city of Trenton..." During the 1960s the War Memorial and the surrounding circle were bypassed by a realignment of Route 29 closer to the Delaware River.

In 1960, the New Jersey Legislature designated the portion of Route 29 north of Trenton as the Daniel Bray Highway to commemorate American Revolutionary War Captain Daniel Bray, a native of Kingwood Township.

In talks since the 1980s, the section of Route 29 in Trenton has been considered being redeveloped in order to connect city residents with the waterfront once again. In July 2023, Trenton was granted $1.016 million from the Delaware Valley Regional Planning Commission to study proposals for redevelopment of the waterfront. The main plan is to turn Route 29 into an urban boulevard, as well as build a new mixed-used community adjacent to the waterfront, which includes a few new streets. The new layout for Route 29 would veer the road slightly inland to open up the waterfront between the State House and Route 1, aligning the new boulevard with the original road along Stacy Park. Additionally, the area around Riverview Plaza is supposed to receive pedestrian and cycling improvements as a part of the new Delaware River Heritage Trail. The main area of redevelopment, which mostly consists of parking lots surrounding governmental buildings, will include various developments, including low and mid-rise mixed use residential buildings, an office building in the lot adjacent to the NJ Department of Labor building, a public square, expansion of greenery around the William Trent House, and a new parking facility. There is currently no timeframe for when construction would begin.

== Major intersections ==
County	Location	mi	km	Old exit	New exit	Destinations	Notes
Mercer	Hamilton Township	0.00	0.00			I-195 east to I-95 Toll / N.J. Turnpike – Belmar	Continuation east
Mercer	Hamilton Township	0.00	0.00	60	1B-A	I-295 – Camden, Princeton	Partial cloverleaf interchange; signed as exits 1B (north) and 1A (south); exit 60B on I-295
Mercer	Hamilton Township	1.64	2.64			Route 129 to South Lamberton Road – Trenton, Duck Island	Northbound exit and southbound entrance; Route 129 south not signed
Mercer	Trenton	1.77	2.85			South Lamberton Road – Duck Island	Southbound exit and entrance
Mercer	Trenton			South Trenton Tunnel			
Mercer	Trenton	2.56	4.12			Lalor Street (CR 650 east)	Southbound exit and northbound entrance
Mercer	Trenton	3.37	5.42			US 1 south (Toll Bridge) – Morrisville	
Mercer	Trenton	3.63	5.84			Market Street to US 1 north / Route 33 east / Route 129 south – Arena	US 1/Route 129/Arena not signed northbound; access to Trenton Transit Center
Mercer	Trenton	3.84	6.18			Memorial Drive – Capitol Complex	
Mercer	Trenton	4.34	6.98			Calhoun Street – Capitol Complex, Thomas Edison State University, Morrisville, PA	
Mercer	Trenton	4.81	7.74			Riverside Avenue	Northbound exit only
Mercer	Trenton	5.01	8.06			Hermitage Avenue	Northbound exit only
Mercer	Trenton	5.45	8.77			Parkside Avenue – Cadwalder Park	Northbound exit and southbound entrance
Mercer	Trenton	5.60	9.01			South Eastfield Avenue	Northbound exit only
Mercer	Trenton			Northern end of limited-access section			
Mercer	Trenton	6.18	9.95			CR 579 north (Sullivan Way) / Sanhican Drive / Mount Vernon Avenue – West Trenton	Southern terminus of CR 579
Mercer	Trenton	6.74	10.85	Southern end of limited-access section			
Mercer	Trenton	6.74	10.85			Route 175 north (Sanhican Drive)	Northbound exit only; southern terminus of Route 175
Mercer	Ewing Township	8.49	13.66			Route 175 (West Upper Ferry Road) – West Trenton	At-grade intersection
Mercer	Ewing Township	9.13	14.69			I-295 (Scudder Falls Bridge) to I-95 – Princeton, Philadelphia	I-295 exit 76; former I-95
Mercer	Ewing Township	9.13	14.69	Northern end of limited-access section			
Mercer	Ewing Township	9.55	15.37			Route 175 south – West Trenton	Interchange; northern terminus of Route 175; northbound access is via center median u-turn ramp
Mercer	Hopewell Township	11.95	19.23			CR 546 east (Washington Crossing-Pennington Road) / Washington Crossing Bridge – Pennington, Newtown	Western terminus of CR 546
Hunterdon	Lambertville	18.60	29.93	Route 165 begins			
Hunterdon	Lambertville	18.77	30.21			CR 518 east (Brunswick Street) – Hopewell	Western terminus of CR 518
Hunterdon	Lambertville	18.87	30.37			Route 179 north (Bridge Street) – Ringoes Route 165 ends	Southern end of Route 179 concurrency
Hunterdon	Lambertville	18.89	30.40			Route 179 south (Bridge Street) – New Hope	Northern end of Route 179 concurrency
Hunterdon	Delaware Township	20.06	32.28			US 202 – Pennsylvania, Flemington	Interchange
Hunterdon	Stockton	22.37	36.00			Bridge Street to PA 263 south – Solebury, PA	
Hunterdon	Stockton	22.48	36.18			CR 523 north (Stockton-Flemington Road) – Sergeantsville, Flemington	Southern terminus of CR 523
Hunterdon	Delaware Township	23.03	37.06			CR 519 north (Kingwood-Stockton Road) – Rosemont	Southern terminus of CR 519
Hunterdon	Frenchtown	34.71	55.86			Route 12 (Bridge Street / Race Street)	Northern terminus
1.000 mi = 1.609 km; 1.000 km = 0.621 mi: Concurrency terminus; Incomplete access; Tolled

== See also ==
- Pennsylvania Route 32, parallel route on the opposite side of the Delaware River
