= Wilburtha, New Jersey =

Populated place in Mercer County, New Jersey, US

- Unincorporated community
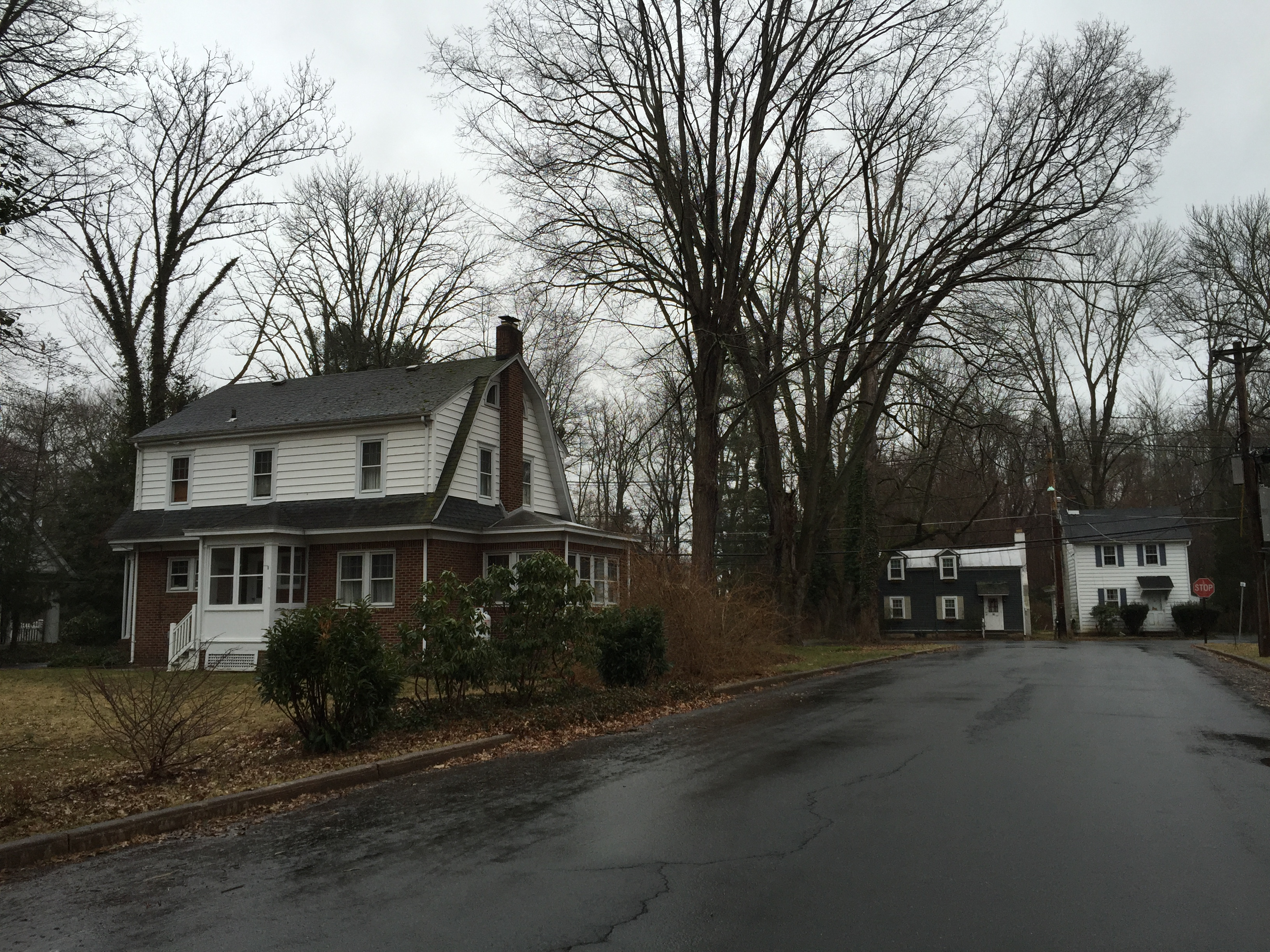
- Homes at the intersection of Blackwood Drive and Wilburtha Road in the Wilburtha section of Ewing, New Jersey

- Location within Mercer County, New Jersey Location within New Jersey Location within the United States
- Coordinates: 40°15′07″N 74°49′57″W
- Country: United States
- State: New Jersey
- County: Mercer
- Township: Ewing
- Elevation: 62 ft (19 m)
- GNIS feature ID: 881825

Wilburtha is a section of Ewing Township in Mercer County, in the U.S. state of New Jersey. Located where Wilburtha Road crosses the Delaware and Raritan Canal, it is one of the oldest settlements in Ewing Township and developed due to the construction of the canal in the early 19th century. The community was known as Greensburg before adopting its current name in 1883. The Yardley–Wilburtha Bridge once connected Wilburtha to Yardley, Pennsylvania on the other side of the Delaware River. The Belvidere Delaware Railroad once passed through the village. Today, Wilburtha is primarily a residential neighborhood consisting of detached, single-family homes, the majority of which were built in the 1950s through the early 1980s. There are still many Georgian and Federal-style homes found in the area.
