= Yardley–Wilburtha Bridge =

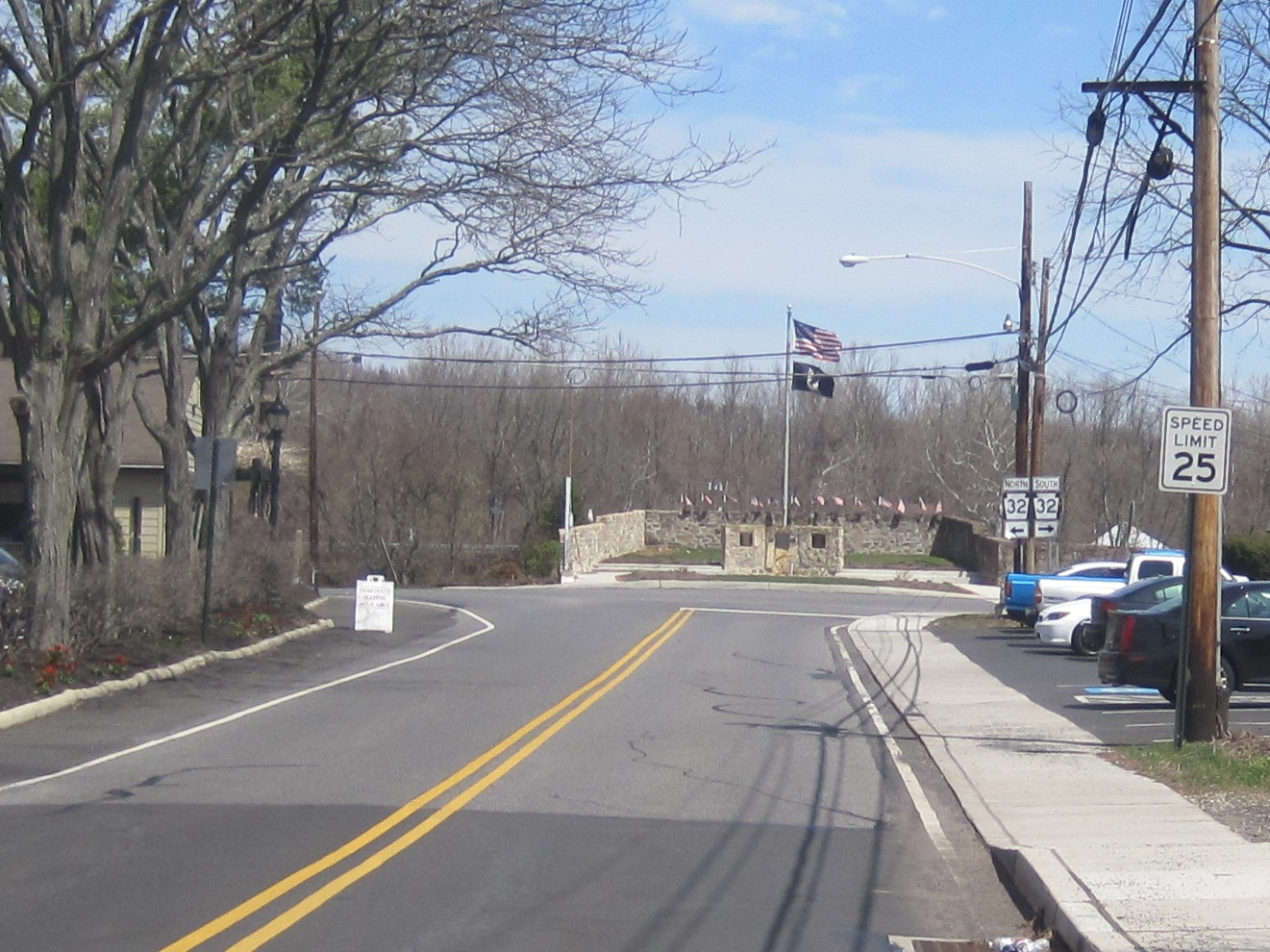
- The western terminus of the bridge was located at the intersection of PA 32 and PA 332 in Yardley. The western bridge abutment is now used as a veterans memorial.
- Coordinates: 40.2460°N 74.8356°W
- Crosses: Delaware River
- Locale: Wilburtha section of Ewing Township, New Jersey and Yardley, Pennsylvania

Characteristics
- Design: Truss bridge
- Total length: 903 feet (275 m)

History
- Opened: 1835
- Closed: May 3, 1961

The Yardley–Wilburtha Bridge was a bridge spanning the Delaware River. A majority of the bridge was washed away by severe flooding in 1955 and was later demolished in 1961 after the completion of the nearby Scudder Falls Bridge.

== History ==
=== Original bridge ===
The first structure located at the site of the now demolished Yardley–Wilburtha Bridge was built in 1835 by the Yardleyville–Delaware Bridge Company. It was originally a wooden toll bridge that connected the borough of Yardleyville (known today as Yardley) in Bucks County, Pennsylvania, and the Greensburg (known today as Wilburtha) section of Ewing Township in Mercer County, New Jersey. The bridge, which was built on stone foundations, measured 903 feet (275 m) long and had six spans.

Little more than five years after having been built, the original bridge was damaged in a flood on January 8, 1841. Three of its spans were swept away, and it was replaced with another wooden bridge. For the next sixty years, the replacement bridge operated profitably and was eventually renamed the Yardley–Wilburtha Bridge when the two communities it connected were renamed.

In October 1903, the Delaware River experienced its worst flood in history. The wooden Yardley–Wilburtha Bridge was devastated, and deemed well beyond repair. At this point, the Yardleyville-Delaware Bridge Company built a new steel Warren-truss bridge with six spans on the old bridge's foundation. In 1922, the bridge was purchased by the Pennsylvania-New Jersey Joint Bridge Commission, the predecessor to the Delaware River Joint Toll Bridge Commission.

=== Destruction and temporary structure ===
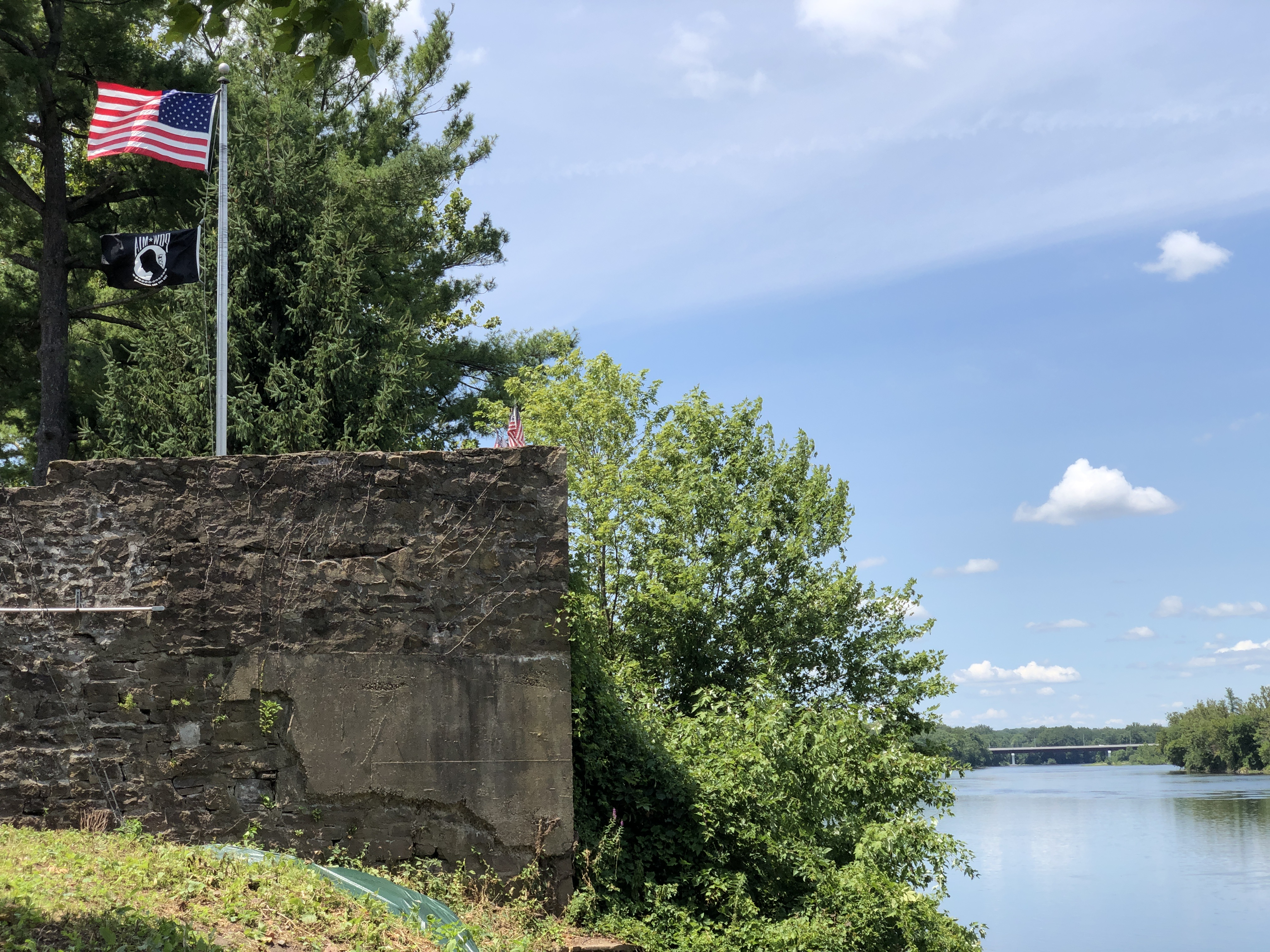
The remaining west abutment viewed from the river bank, with its ultimate replacement (the Scudder Falls Bridge) visible in the distance on the lower right

Flooding from Hurricanes Connie and Diane in August 1955 devastated the Delaware River region. Flooding from the hurricanes ravaged many bridges along the river, wiping out three of four spans of the Portland–Columbia Covered Bridge, the Point Pleasant–Byram Bridge, and the Yardley–Wilburtha Bridge. (A portion of the Northampton Street Bridge was also wiped out.) In the case of the Yardley–Wilburtha, the spans were taken out by a home that floated along the flooded river. On August 29, engineers inspected the remains of the structure.

On September 7, two weeks after flooding wiped out the bridge's three spans, Dwight Palmer, the New Jersey State Flood Relief Coordinator announced that the United States Army Corps of Engineers would build new temporary spans at Yardley–Wilburtha, and at the Northampton Street Bridge. On September 17 they announced that construction of a new temporary bridge would begin no later than October 15 and be completed by November 1. The new structure would cost $95,000 (1955 USD). On October 1, a contract to replace the structure was awarded to the Conduit Foundation Corporation of Philadelphia, Pennsylvania. Their bid was $99,000 and would begin work on October 3, with a completion date of November 20.

During construction of the new bridge, a barge came loose from its moorings on October 17, floating 3 miles (4.8 km) downstream and forcing an emergency closure of the Calhoun Street Bridge in Trenton. On November 17, it was announced that the contractor would not meet the November 30 deadline and completion of a new structure would not be completed until December 22. With the Christmas holiday approaching, it was decided that a man in a Santa Claus outfit would help open the new span. On December 23, Robert Lane in a Santa Claus costume, along with members of the Delaware River Joint Bridge Commission and the United States Army Corps of Engineers delivered the final spike on the replacement structure.

Remnants of the three destroyed spans washed up lodged in the river and lasted into June 1956. The process of removing the remnants from the water began in July.

=== Replacement and demolition ===
On March 1, 1956, the Toll Bridge Commission noted that while the Northampton Street Bridge was to reopened on March 10 that plans for replacement permanent structures for the three bridges washed away by the flooding. By June, this new bridge proposal at Yardley–Wilburtha came closer to reality with a new bridge proposed 100 feet (30 m) north of the temporary span. This new bridge would be higher off the ground with 14 feet (4.3 m) high overpasses so the river flooding would not wipe away the new structure. On each side of the bridge would be new cloverleaf interchanges to funnel traffic. This new bridge would cost $4 million (1956 USD).

More details into the design of the new bridge at Yardley–Wilburtha. This new bridge would come from a ramp on PA 32 (River Road) in Yardley, about 400 feet (120 m) north of the temporary bridge. The bridge would include an interchange for River Road near Brown Street.
