= 1978 United States Senate election in South Carolina =

- November 7, 1978
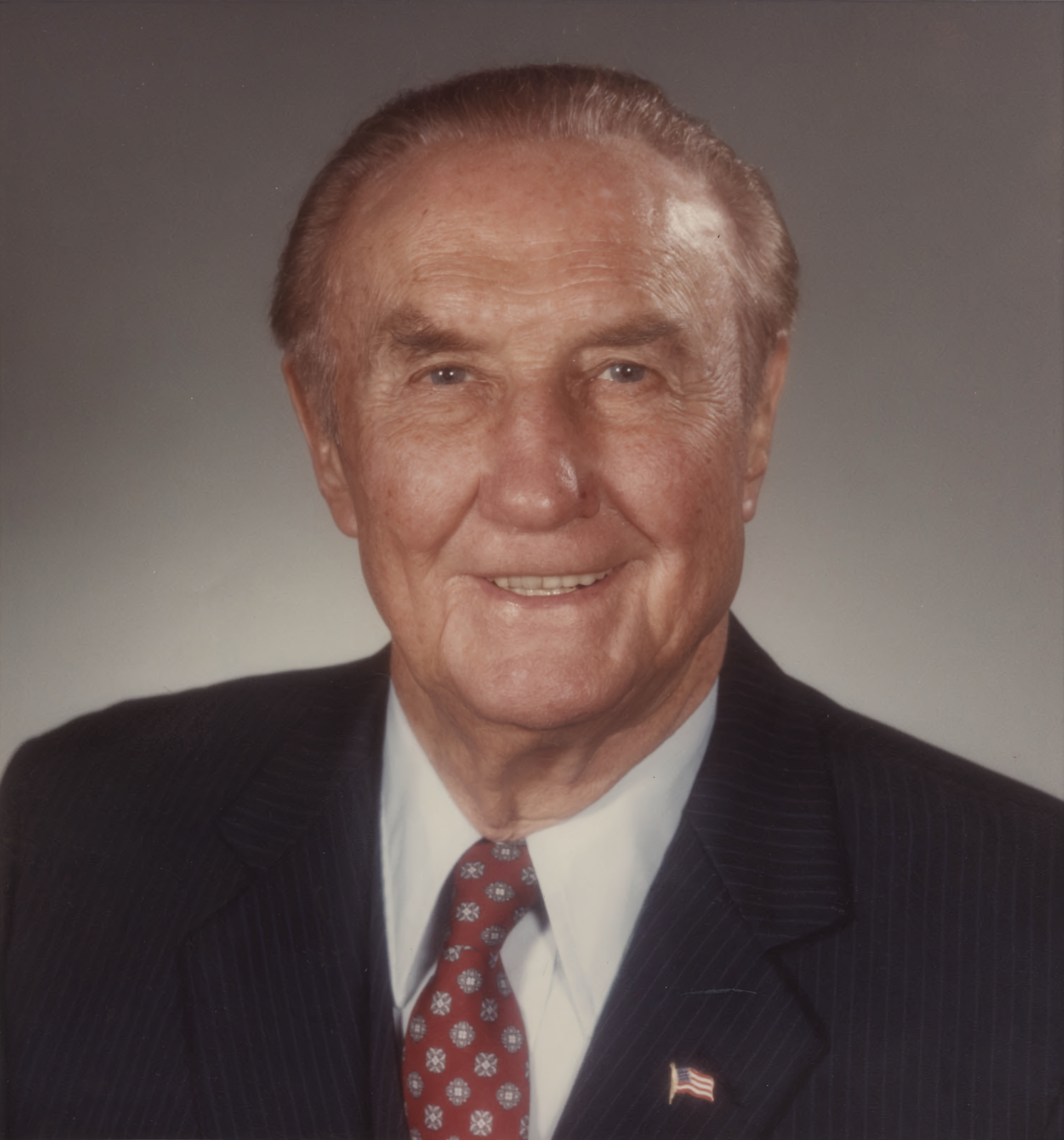

Nominee	Strom Thurmond	Charles D. Ravenel
Party	Republican	Democratic
Popular vote	351,733	281,119
Percentage	55.56%	44.40%
- County results Thurmond: 50–60% 60–70% 70–80% Ravenel: 50–60%
U.S. senator before election
Strom Thurmond
Republican
Elected U.S. Senator
Strom Thurmond
Republican

The 1978 South Carolina United States Senate election was held on November 7, 1978, to select the U.S. senator from the state of South Carolina. Popular incumbent Republican Senator Strom Thurmond defeated Democratic challenger Charles D. Ravenel.

== Democratic primary ==
The South Carolina Democratic Party held their primary for governor on June 13, 1978. Charles D. Ravenel, an unsuccessful candidate in the 1974 gubernatorial contest, originally planned to run for governor again in 1978, but was convinced by Vice President Walter Mondale in 1977 to run for senator. He garnered over 50% of the vote in the primary and avoided a runoff election.

Democratic Primary
Party	Candidate	Votes	%
Democratic	Charles D. Ravenel	205,348	55.95%
Democratic	John Bolt Culbertson	69,184	18.85%
Democratic	Tom Triplett	50,957	13.88%
Democratic	Tom McElveen	41,557	11.32%
Total votes		367,046	100.00%

== Republican primary ==
Senator Strom Thurmond faced no opposition from South Carolina Republicans and avoided a primary election.

== General election campaign ==
Thurmond generally ignored Ravenel on the campaign and refused to debate him. When they did cross paths, Thurmond criticized Ravenel for never having held a political office. Ravenel did not help his cause by his actions in the 1974 gubernatorial race when he refused to endorse the Democratic nominee after he had been disqualified. This irritated many Democrats and they also accused him of being nothing more than a liberal New Yorker. Age was beginning to become an issue with Thurmond, so to combat perceptions of old age, Thurmond often appeared with his children on the campaign trail. While 1978 was generally a Democratic year, Thurmond was able to pull off a commanding victory over Ravenel.

Thurmond, having first been elected on a segregationist platform in the 1950s, had somewhat moderated his racial views in the 1970s, having hired African American staffers, championed grants to black colleges and businesses, voted in favor of extending the Voting Rights Act of 1965, and established scholarships for black students at four South Carolina colleges with religious affiliations. That garnered him the endorsement of 10 of South Carolina's 11 African American mayors. In addition, Isaac W. Williams, the Field Director of the state's NAACP chapter, did not outright endorse him, but considered what Thurmond would do for the Black community in 1978 more important than his actions in the 1940s and 1950s, saying that "if voters just try to punish a politician for the sins of the past, what does it profit him to improve?" thus also managing to increase his African American support.

== General election results ==
1978 South Carolina U.S. Senate Election
Party	Candidate	Votes	%	±%
Republican	Strom Thurmond (incumbent)	351,733	55.56%	−7.73%
Democratic	Charles D. Ravenel	281,119	44.40%	+7.71%
Write-in		257	0.04%	N/A
Total votes		633,109	100.00%	
Majority		70,614	11.15%	−15.45%
Turnout		633,109	57.7%	−7.5%
Republican hold				

== See also ==
- 1978 United States Senate elections
- 1978 South Carolina gubernatorial election
- List of United States senators from South Carolina
