= Carolina Gold (disambiguation) =

Carolina Gold is a variety of African rice grown in the Carolinas.

Carolina Gold may also refer to:

- Carolina Gold Drum and Bugle Corps, a drum corps based in Raleigh, North Carolina
- Carolina gold rush, the first gold rush in the United States
- Carolina Gold BBQ Sauce, a popular sauce developed by Maurice Bessinger
