= Lake Ceva =

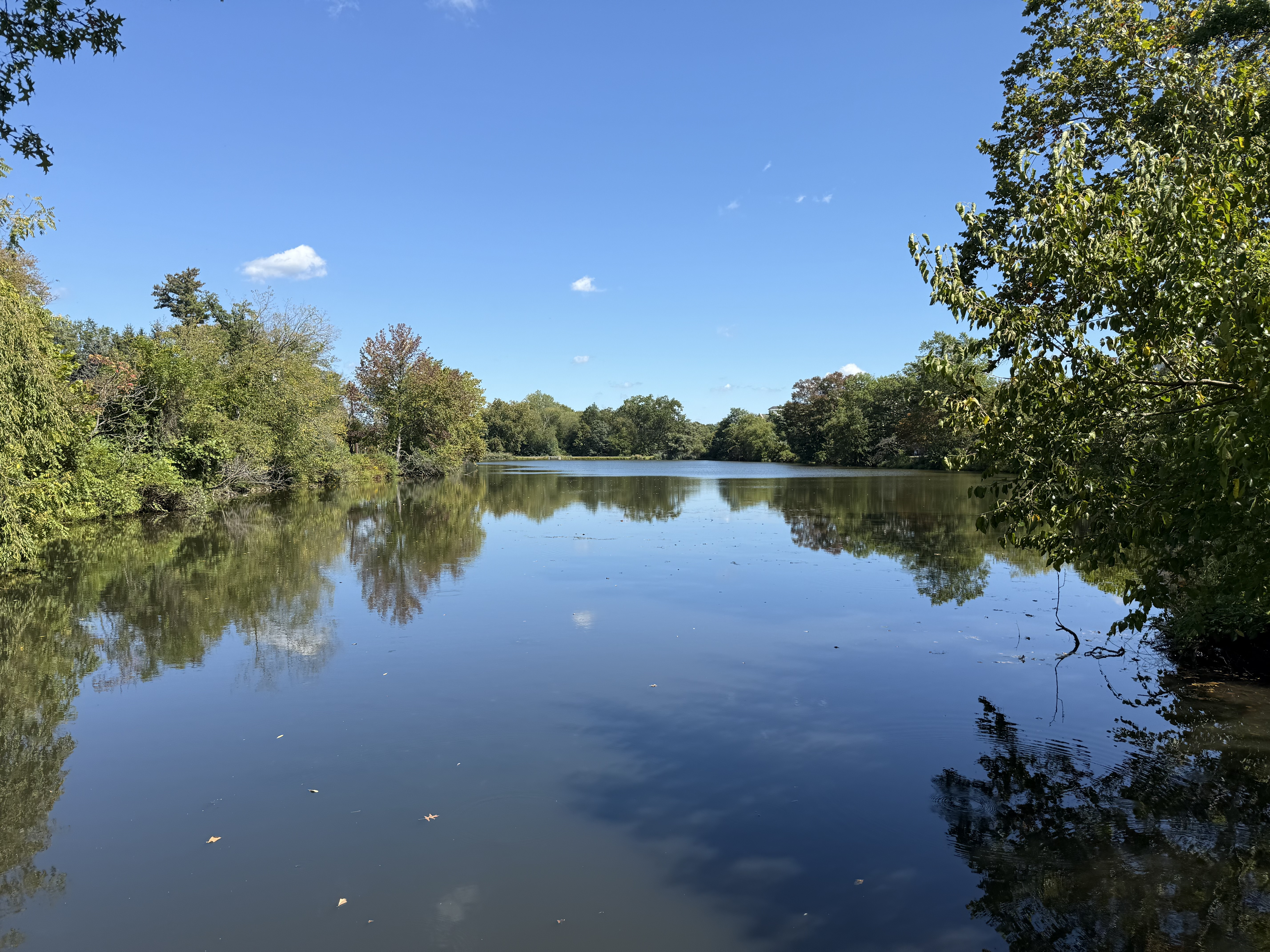
- View east from the west end of Lake Ceva

- Location within Mercer County, New Jersey Location within New Jersey Location within the United States
- Location: Ewing Township, Mercer County, New Jersey
- Coordinates: 40°16′21″N 74°46′46″W
- Type: Reservoir
- Primary outflows: Shabakunk Creek
- Surface area: 6 acres (2.4 ha)
- Surface elevation: 105 feet (32 m)

Lake Ceva is a 6-acre (2.4 ha) man-made lake near the Shabakunk Creek on the campus of The College of New Jersey in Ewing Township, Mercer County, New Jersey, United States. The lake was created when an earthen dam was constructed across a small tributary of the Shabakunk in the 1920s by a local landowner, prior to the construction of the current college campus. The lake is adjacent to Lake Sylva, and together the two lakes are the basis of the name of the Hillwood Lakes section of Ewing.
