= Moultrie Playground =

Park in Charleston, South Carolina, United States

Coordinates: 32.7763°N 79.9423°W

- Interactive map of Moultrie Playground
- Location: 41 Ashley Ave., Charleston, South Carolina 29401
- Area: 4.7 acres (1.9 ha)
- Created: 1930
- Operator: City of Charleston

Moultrie Playground is a public park in Charleston, South Carolina.

== History ==
Moultrie Playground is on a section of mud flats near the west bank of the Ashley River just north of Broad Street. The land was eyed as a possible playground as early as 1912. The success of the first playground at Mitchell Elementary School prompted interest in a playground for the lower peninsula children. In 1922, a landfill program was begun by Mayor Thomas Stoney. The park opened in 1930. Former South Carolina Democratic gubernatorial candidate Charles D. Ravenel became known as "Pug" as a kid after running into a pole at Moultrie Playground.

== Sgt. Jasper apartments ==
The park was originally larger than it is today. Part of the land was sold by the city and this land became the Sergeant Jasper Apartments. Originally, the developer of the apartments, the Beach Company, wanted to construct them on Moultrie Playground itself, however they later developed a plan to build instead on reclaimed mud flats to the side of the Playground. As part of the deal, an even larger section of the mud flats would be filled to serve as a playground.

In June 1949, the backers of the apartment announced a chance to their plans which would build the apartment on the mud flats, leaving the park on its existing high grounds. The ability to sell the reclaimed marshlands was held by the Colonial Common and Ashley River Embankment Commission whose members opposed the sale of the land by 9 to 1. The South Carolina Statehouse was prepared to consider changes to the law that would place the ability with City Council instead. City Council itself, however, asked the Statehouse to simply modify the existing laws to give the power to overrule the Colonial Commons Commission by a three-quarters vote.

By July 1949, the Statehouse had acted on the matter and gave City Council the ability to overturn the decision of the commissioners by a two-thirds vote. At a meeting of the Commission on July 8, 1949, the Commission voted 7-3 against selling the filled mudflat area of the park to developer J.C. Long for $5,000 for the construction of a 14-story apartment building, and the matter went to City Council. On July 18, 1949, the Ways and Means Committee of City Council voted in favor of selling 7.4 acres of mudflats to Sergeant Jasper, Inc. for the construction of a 14-story apartment. As part of the deal, the developer made other concessions concerning easements and restrictions on further sales.

== Sgt. Jasper Controversy ==
The Sergeant Jasper's owner, The Beach Company, proposed a redevelopment of the property in 2014. As the Palmetto Business Daily reported, several concepts for the property's redevelopment were rejected by the BAR. As a result, The Beach Company filed suit over what it claimed was an "arbitrary and capricious" review process by the BAR. The Sergeant Jasper stakeholders went into court-ordered mediation over the project on April 6, 2014.

== Modern improvements ==
Lighting was added to the park in 1975 to help combat criminal activity.

Plans for a major refurbishment were developed in 1977 which would have built tennis courts, placing overhead wires underground, building new dugouts, renovating bleachers, fencing the baseball diamond, adding a backstop, refurbishing the pressbox, and adding restrooms. A playground area would be fenced, and parking for 19 cars would be improved. Two shuffleboard courts and board game tables for seniors were planned. The city had about $84,000 available, but the lowest bid approached $102,000.

In 2008 and 2009, the newly formed Charleston Parks Conservancy began laying plans for a redevelopment of both Colonial Lake and the adjacent Moultrie Playground. In 2010, a more formal version of the plans were revealed. The owner of the 1950 apartment building would take over all of the land facing Broad St. to the south (including the park's existing tennis courts) and would be able to redevelop the premises. In exchange, some of the company's land behind its development would be given to the city for new playgrounds and tennis courts.
