= Assunpink Creek =

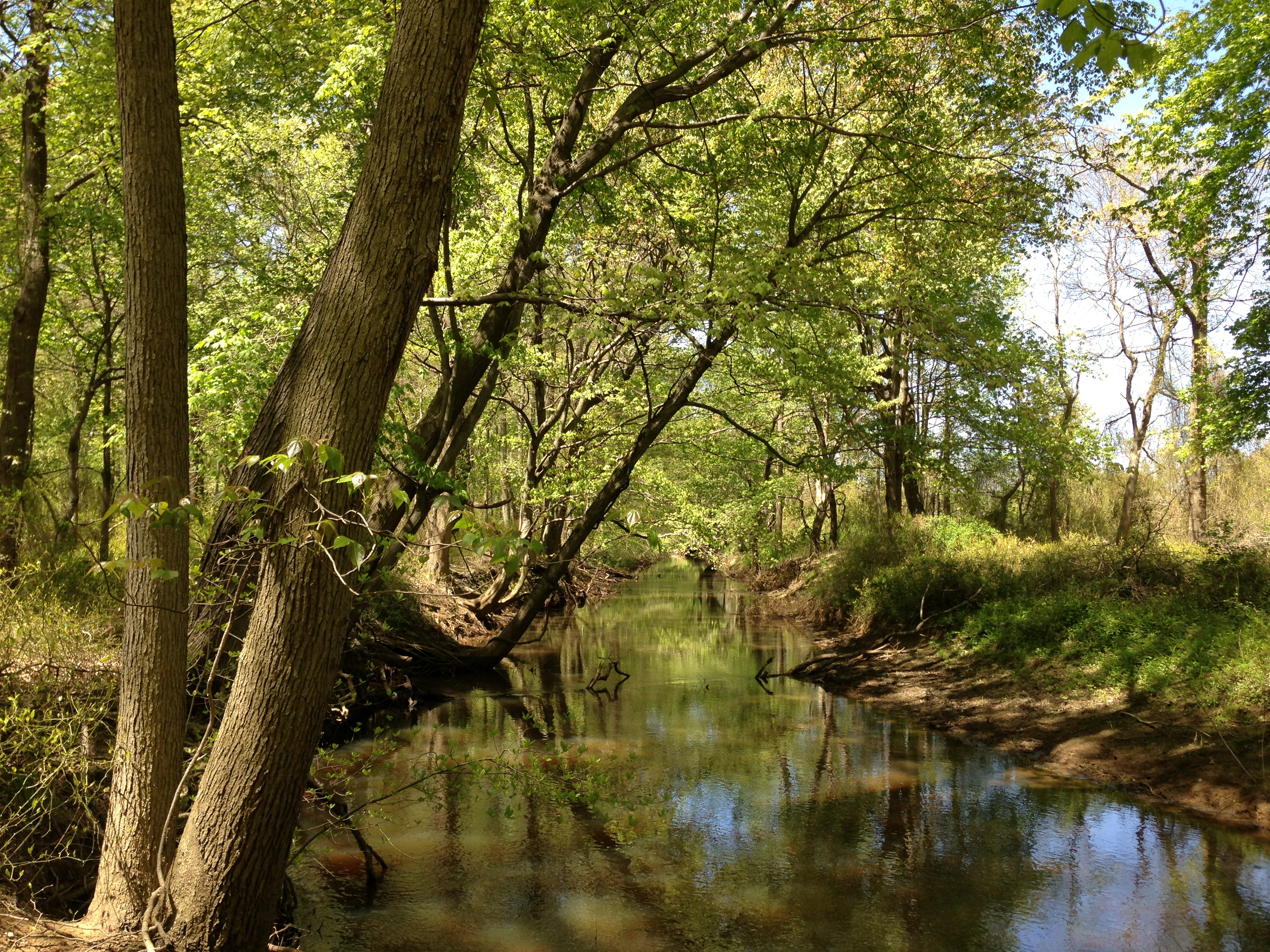
- View west along the Assunpink Creek in West Windsor, NJ

Location
- Country: United States
- State: New Jersey
- Region: Monmouth County, Mercer County

Physical characteristics
- Source
  - location: Millstone Township
  - coordinates: 40°12′8″N 74°26′24″W
  - elevation: 240 ft (73 m)
- Mouth: Delaware River
  - location: Trenton
  - coordinates: 40°12′59″N 74°46′12″W
  - elevation: 3 ft (0.91 m)

Basin features
- River system: Delaware River
- Tributaries
  - left: New Sharon Branch, Miry Run
  - right: Bridegroom Run, Shabakunk Creek

Assunpink Creek is a 22.9-mile-long (36.9 km) tributary of the Delaware River in western New Jersey in the United States. The name Assunpink is from the Lenape Ahsën'pink, meaning "stony, watery place".

== Course ==
The Assunpink Creek is born in rural Monmouth County, about a mile north of Clarksburg. Flowing westwards, it soon enters the Assunpink Wildlife Management Area, where it has been dammed to form Rising Sun Lake. After an unnamed tributary enters from the south, it enters another reservoir, Assunpink Lake. The two lakes, as well as Stone Tavern Lake on the tributary, are popular fishing spots.

Below Assunpink Lake, the creek flows under Old York Road and flows into Mercer County. New Sharon Branch enters the creek from the south at Carsons Mills. The creek now turns northwest, passing under the New Jersey Turnpike and then U.S. Route 130, just southwest of Windsor. Here, it finally exits the Wildlife Management Area.

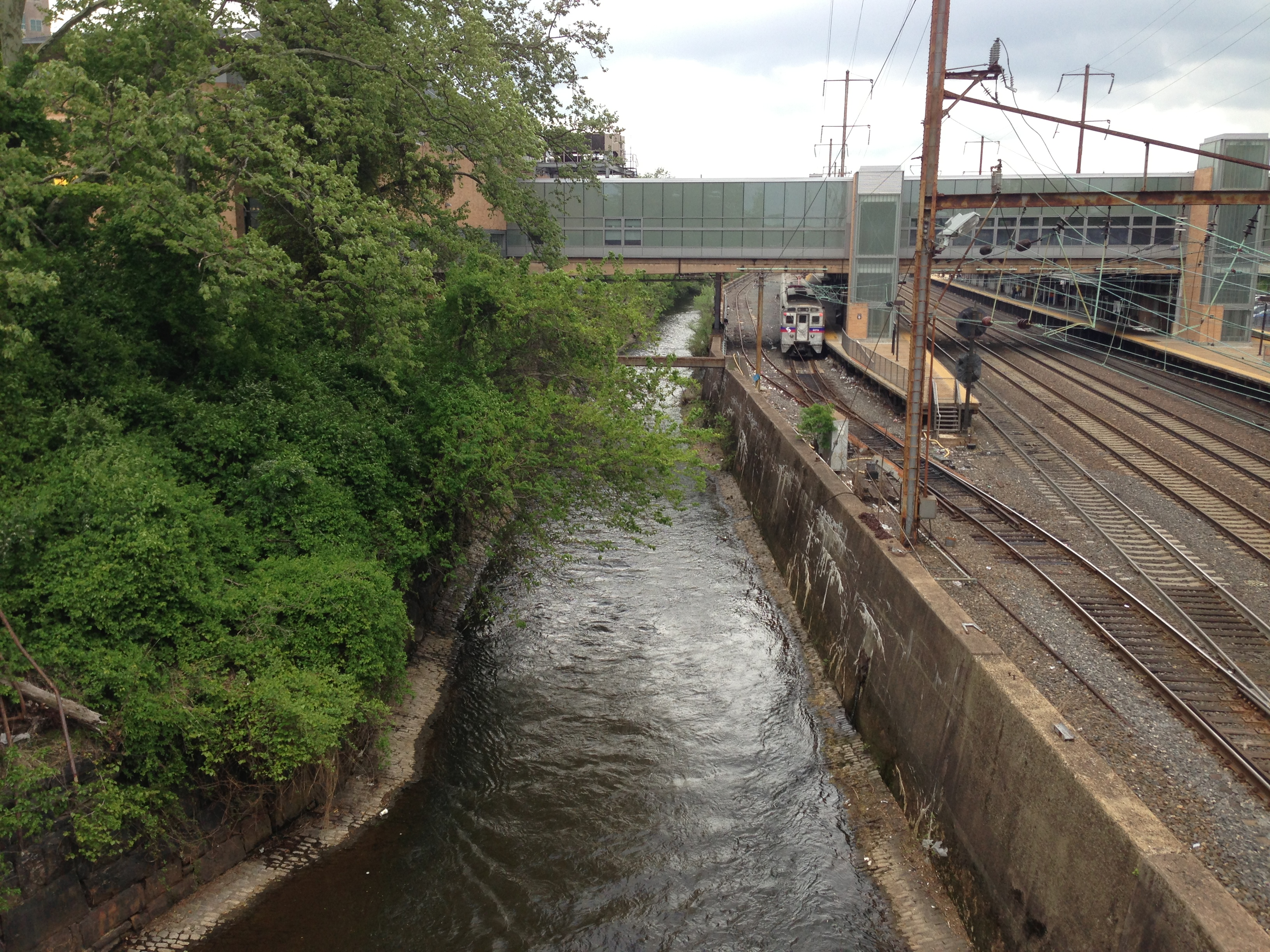
The Assunpink Creek at the Trenton Transit Center

Still further northwest, the creek enters Mercer County Park. Bridegroom Run enters from the north side as the creek turns west and is impounded to form Mercer Lake. A small wildlife management area, the Van Nest Refuge, lies along the stream just below the dam. It then passes under Quaker Bridge Road and Interstate 295 before turning southwest and paralleling the Delaware and Raritan Canal. The creek now enters a heavily built-up area, with the Shabakunk Creek and Miry Run entering just above Whitehead Mill Pond, and Pond Run entering near Hutchinson Mills. The now-canalized stream flows past the Trenton Transit Center and finally empties into the Delaware River in Trenton.

== History ==
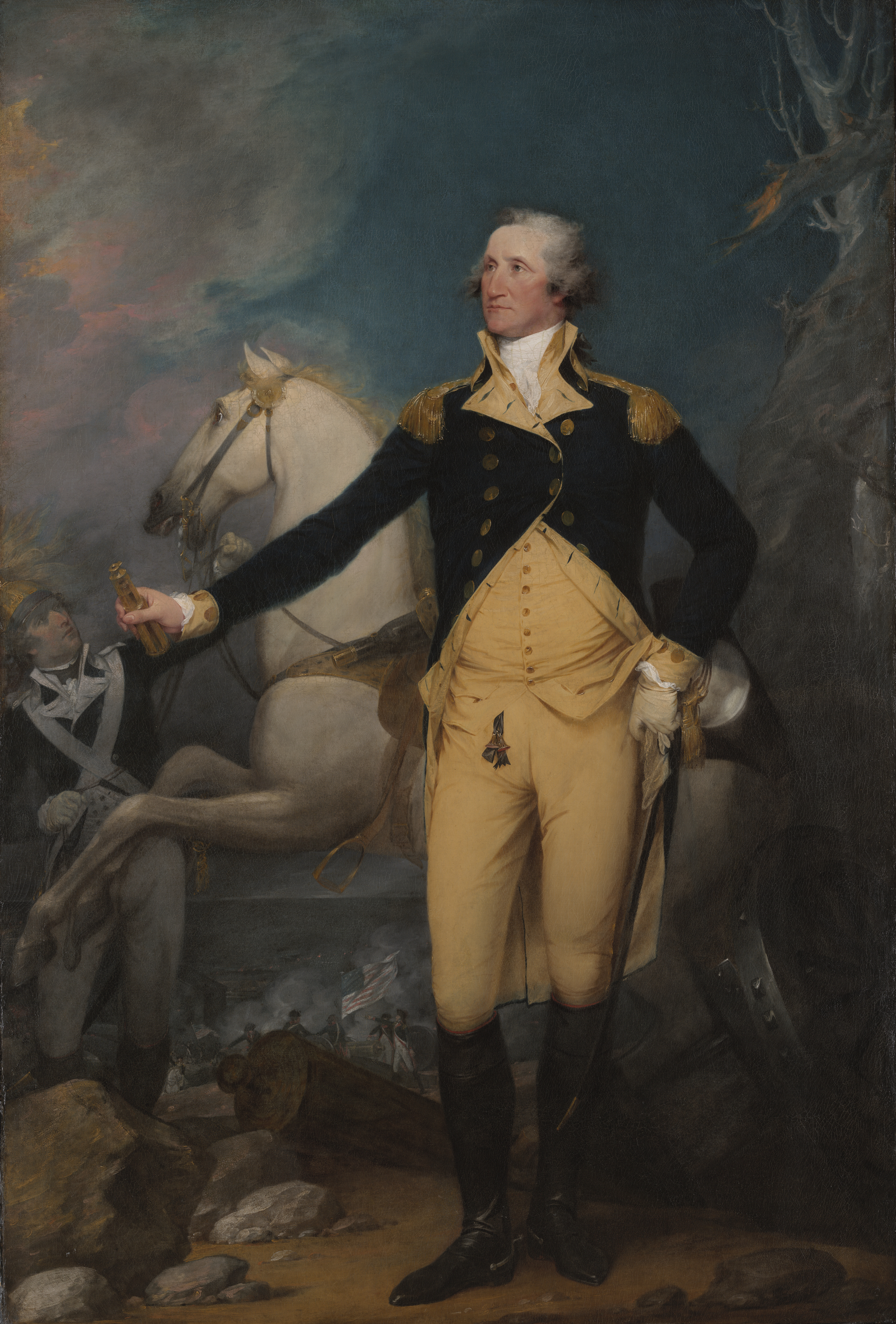
General George Washington at Trenton by John Trumbull Washington on the night of January 2, 1777, with the bridge over the Assunpink Creek and the mill in the background.

On January 2, 1777, during the Second Battle of Trenton of the American Revolutionary War, soldiers of the Continental Army and supporting militias, under the direct command of General George Washington, held a defensive line along the south shore of Assunpink Creek south of Trenton, stretching from the mouth of the creek up to Philip's Mill. The American soldiers successfully repelled several charges by British and Hessian soldiers across a stone bridge over the creek, and also repelled an attempt to ford the creek near its mouth.

== See also ==
- List of rivers of New Jersey
- Assunpink Trail
