= Van Nest Refuge Wildlife Management Area =

Protected area in New Jersey, United States

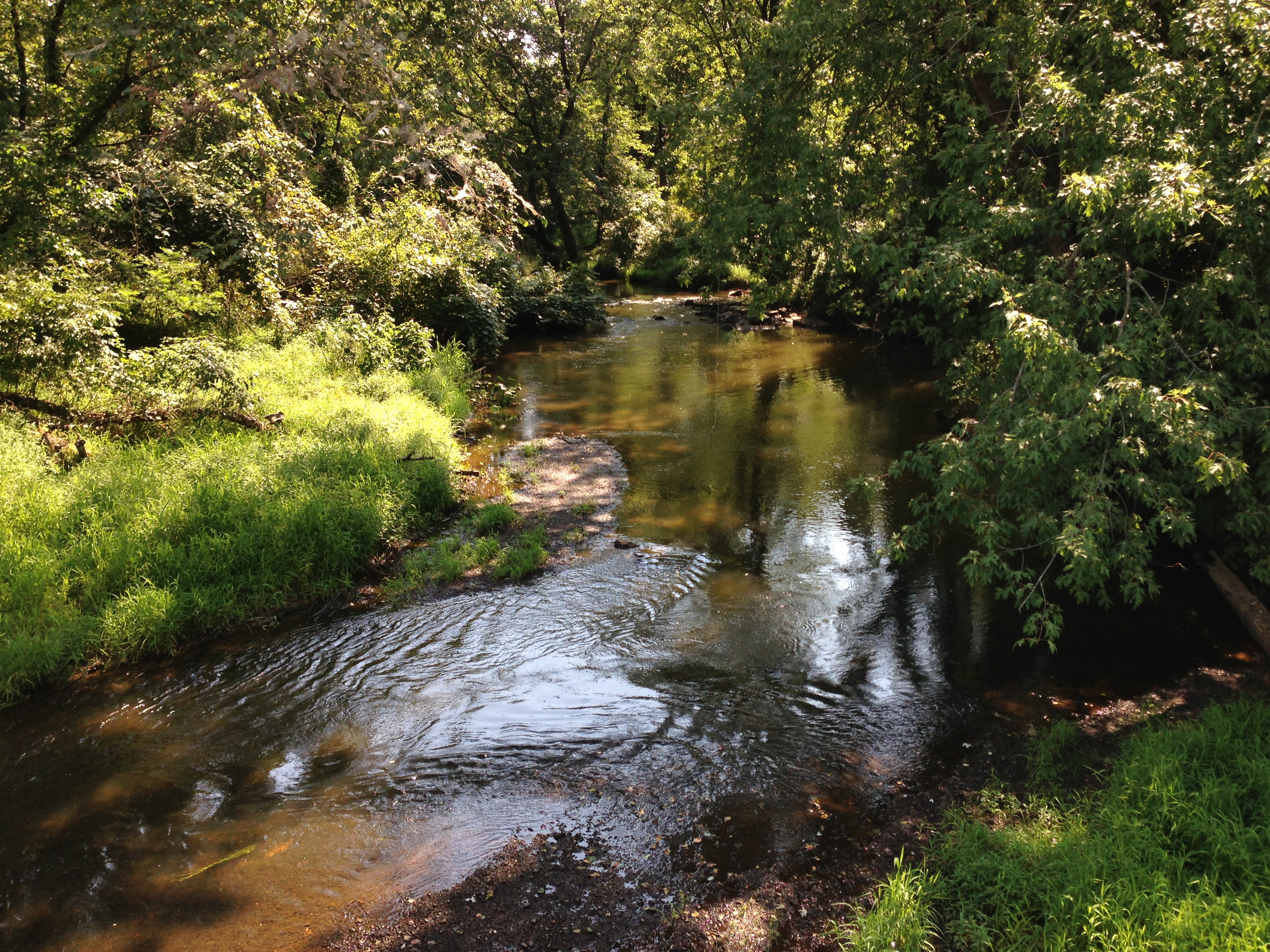
- The Assunpink Creek within the Van Nest Refuge

- Location within Mercer County, New Jersey
- Location: Hamilton Township, Mercer County, New Jersey
- Nearest city: Trenton
- Coordinates: 40.267357°N 74.664934°W
- Area: 98 acres (40 ha)
- Governing body: New Jersey Division of Fish and Wildlife

Van Nest Refuge Wildlife Management Area is a 98-acre (40 ha) wildlife management area in Hamilton Township, Mercer County, New Jersey, United States.
