= 1974 South Carolina gubernatorial election =

- November 5, 1974
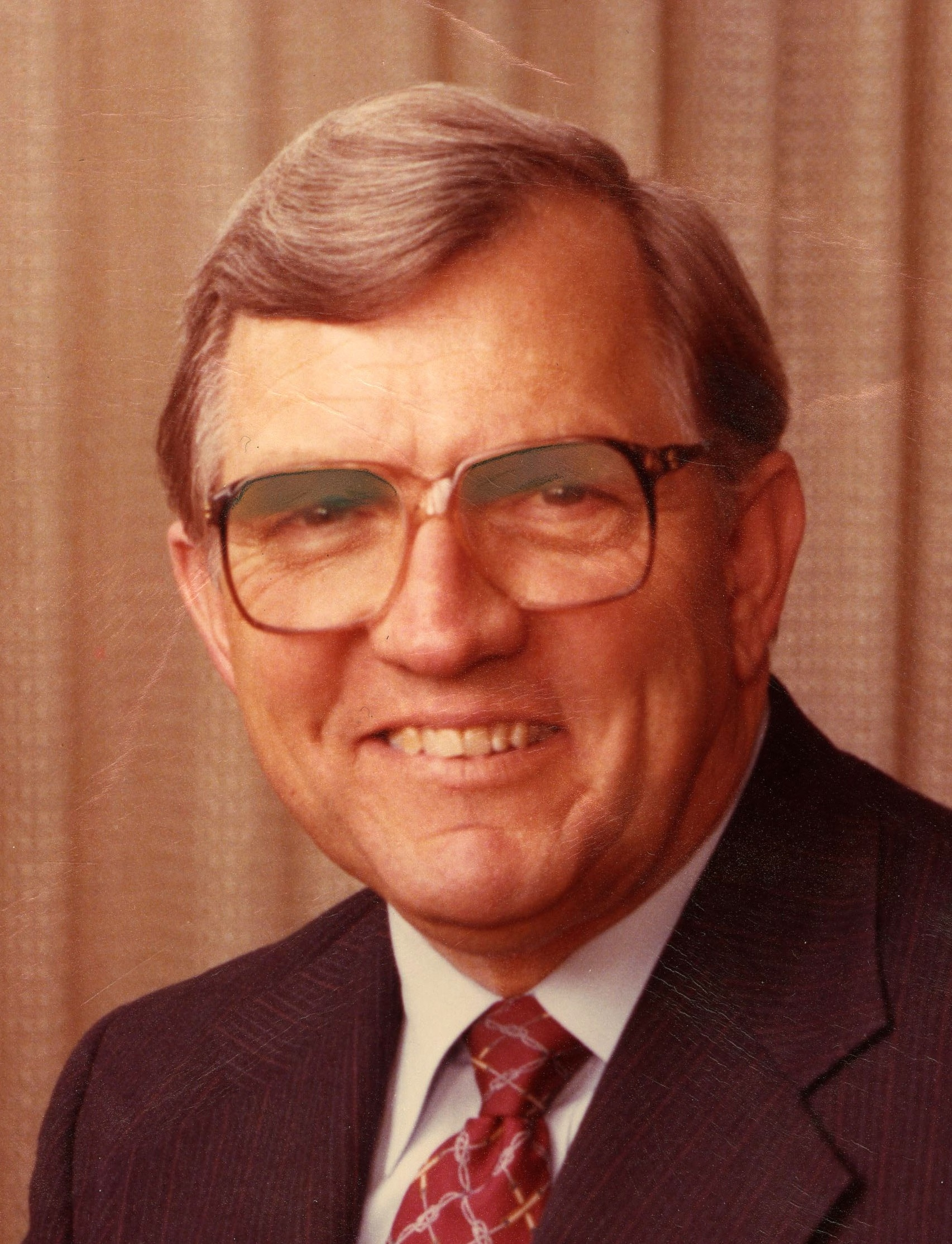

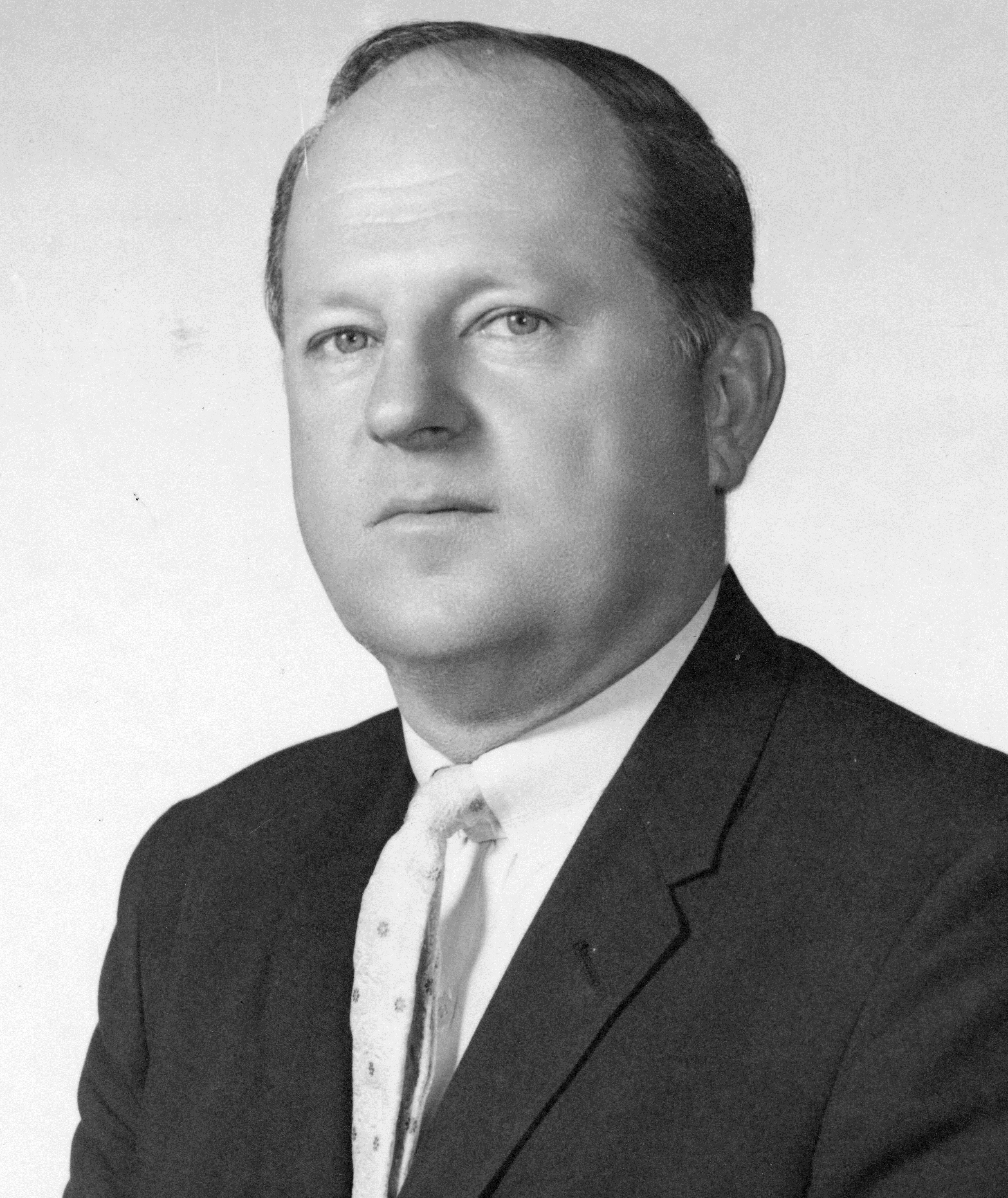
Nominee	James B. Edwards	W.J. Bryan Dorn
Party	Republican	Democratic
Popular vote	266,338	248,861
Percentage	50.34%	47.04%
- County results Edwards: 50–60% 60–70% Dorn: 50–60% 60–70% 70–80% 80–90%
Governor before election
John Carl West
Democratic
Elected Governor
James B. Edwards
Republican

The 1974 South Carolina gubernatorial election was held on November 5, 1974, to select the governor of the state of South Carolina. Initially considered a longshot candidate, Republican James B. Edwards defeated Democrat W. J. Bryan Dorn with a narrow majority of the vote.

Edwards' victory made him the first Republican since Daniel Henry Chamberlain in 1874 to win a gubernatorial election in South Carolina. It was also the closest gubernatorial election in South Carolina since the disputed election of 1876.

== Democratic primary ==
=== Candidates ===
- L. Maurice Bessinger, barbecue proprietor and defendant in Newman v. Piggie Park Enterprises, Inc.
- John Bolt Culbertson, former state representative from Greenville and perennial candidate
- W.J. Bryan Dorn, U.S. representative from Greenwood
- Milton J. Dukes
- Earle Morris Jr., lieutenant governor of South Carolina
- Charles D. Ravenel, banker
- Eugene N. Ziegler

=== Campaign ===
Existing term limit restrictions made Governor John C. West ineligible to run for reelection. The South Carolina Democratic Party held their primary for governor on July 16, 1974 . Charles D. Ravenel emerged as the winner of the runoff election, but the South Carolina Supreme Court ruled that Ravenel did not meet the five-year residency requirement in the state's constitution.

U.S. Representative W. J. Bryan Dorn was chosen in a special state convention to be the Democratic candidate in the general election for governor. Dorn, who had supported George McGovern's 1972 presidential campaign, was described by The New York Times as a "political maverick" who took a relatively liberal line on racial and religious issues.

Democratic primary
Candidate	Votes	%
Charles D. Ravenel	107,345	33.6
W.J. Bryan Dorn	105,743	33.1
Earle E. Morris Jr.	80,292	25.2
Eugene N. Zeigler	11,091	3.5
L. Maurice Bessinger	7,883	2.5
John Bolt Culbertson	4,187	1.3
Milton J. Dukes	2,529	0.8

=== Results ===
Democratic primary runoff
Candidate	Votes	%	±%
Charles D. Ravenel	186,985	54.8	+21.2
W.J. Bryan Dorn	154,187	45.2	+12.1

== Republican primary ==
=== Candidates ===
- James B. Edwards, state senator from Charleston
- William Westmoreland, former chief of staff of the United States Army

=== Results ===
The South Carolina Republican Party held their primary on July 16, 1974, and the contest pitted State Senator James B. Edwards against former Army Chief of Staff William Westmoreland. Edwards scored an upset victory in the first Republican primary of the state and earned the right to face Dorn in the general election.

Republican primary
Candidate	Votes	%
James B. Edwards	20,177	57.7
William Westmoreland	14,777	42.3

== General election ==
=== Candidates ===
- W.J. Bryan Dorn, U.S. representative from Greenwood (Democratic)
- James B. Edwards, state senator from Charleston (Republican)
- Peggy Jennings (Independent)

=== Results ===
The general election was held on November 5, 1974. James B. Edwards defeated W.J. Bryan Dorn in what was a banner year for the Democrats in the wake of the Watergate scandal. Turnout was higher than the previous gubernatorial election because of the increasingly competitive nature of the race between the two parties.

South Carolina gubernatorial election, 1974
Party	Candidate	Votes	%	±%
Republican	James B. Edwards	266,338	50.34	+4.4
Democratic	W.J. Bryan Dorn	248,861	47.04	−5.1
Independent	Peggy Jennings	8,313	1.57	−0.4
No party	Write-Ins	5,528	1.05	+1.1
Majority		17,477	3.30	−2.9
Turnout		529,040	53.02	−1.2
Republican gain from Democratic				

== See also ==
- List of governors of South Carolina
- South Carolina gubernatorial elections

Preceded by 1970	South Carolina gubernatorial elections	Succeeded by 1978
