= Mercer Lake =

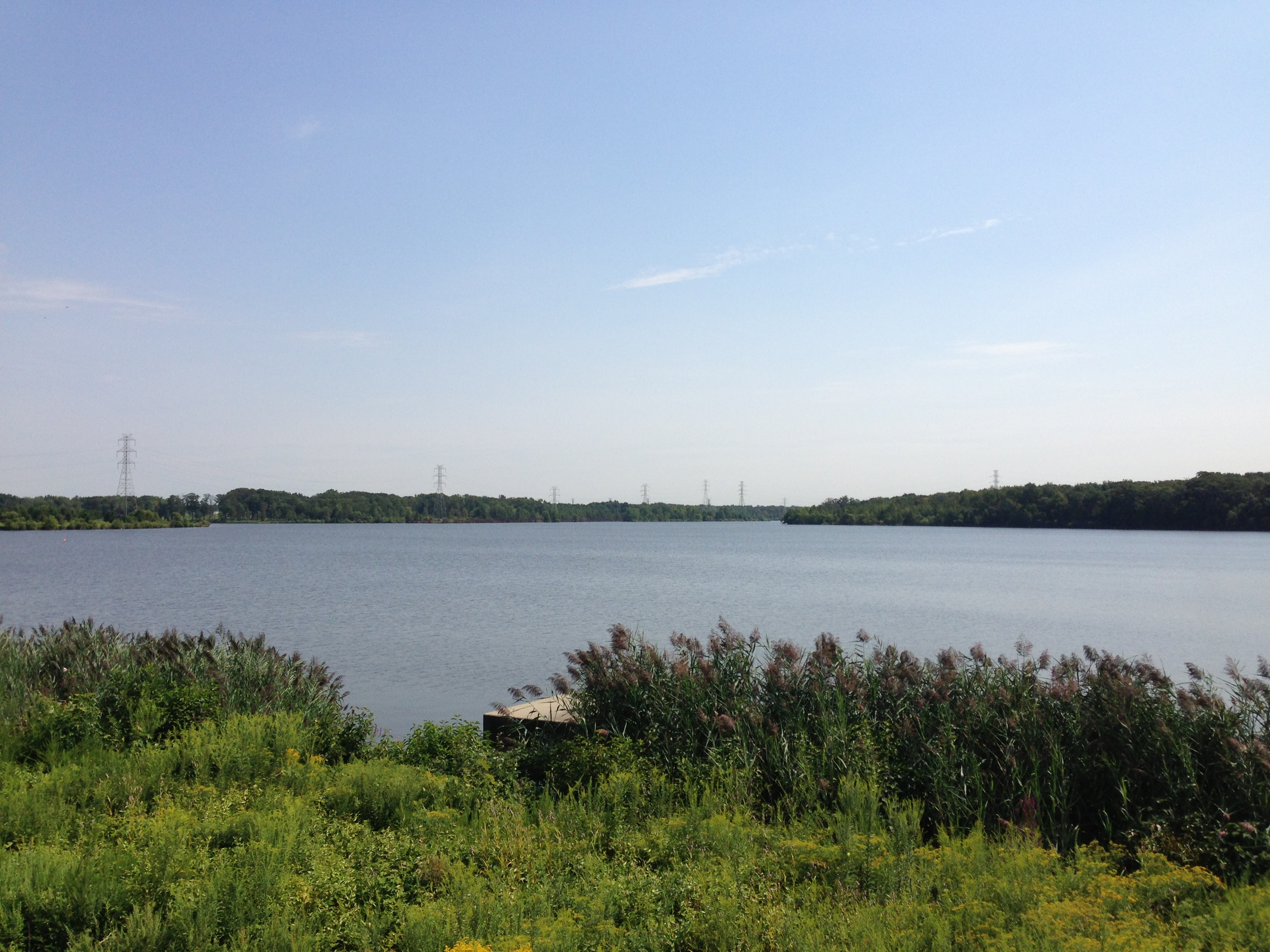
- View east from the dam

- Location in New Jersey
- Location: West Windsor, Mercer County, New Jersey
- Coordinates: 40°16′04.14″N 74°38′58.52″W
- Type: Reservoir
- Primary inflows: Assunpink Creek
- Primary outflows: Assunpink Creek
- Basin countries: United States
- Surface area: 365 acres (1.48 km^{2})
- Surface elevation: 62 feet (19 m)

Mercer Lake, also known as Lake Mercer, is a man-made lake within Mercer County Park in West Windsor, Mercer County, New Jersey, United States.

== History ==
The lake came into being with the 1975 construction of a dam to control flooding on the Assunpink Creek in nearby Trenton by the United States Department of Agriculture Soil Conservation Service (now the Natural Resources Conservation Service). The basin, now occupied by the lake, was excavated by crews building nearby Interstate 295 at no additional cost to taxpayers.

== Rowing ==
The lake is the home of one of the US Olympic Rowing Team's training centers. It has played host to the 1988, 1992, 2004 and 2008 U.S. Olympic Team Trials for Rowing, in addition to USRowing National Team selection events, international regattas, and both collegiate and junior national championship regattas. The infrastructure and topography of the racecourse meets FISA standards and PNRA has the equipment necessary to host the world's largest regattas.

== Fishing ==
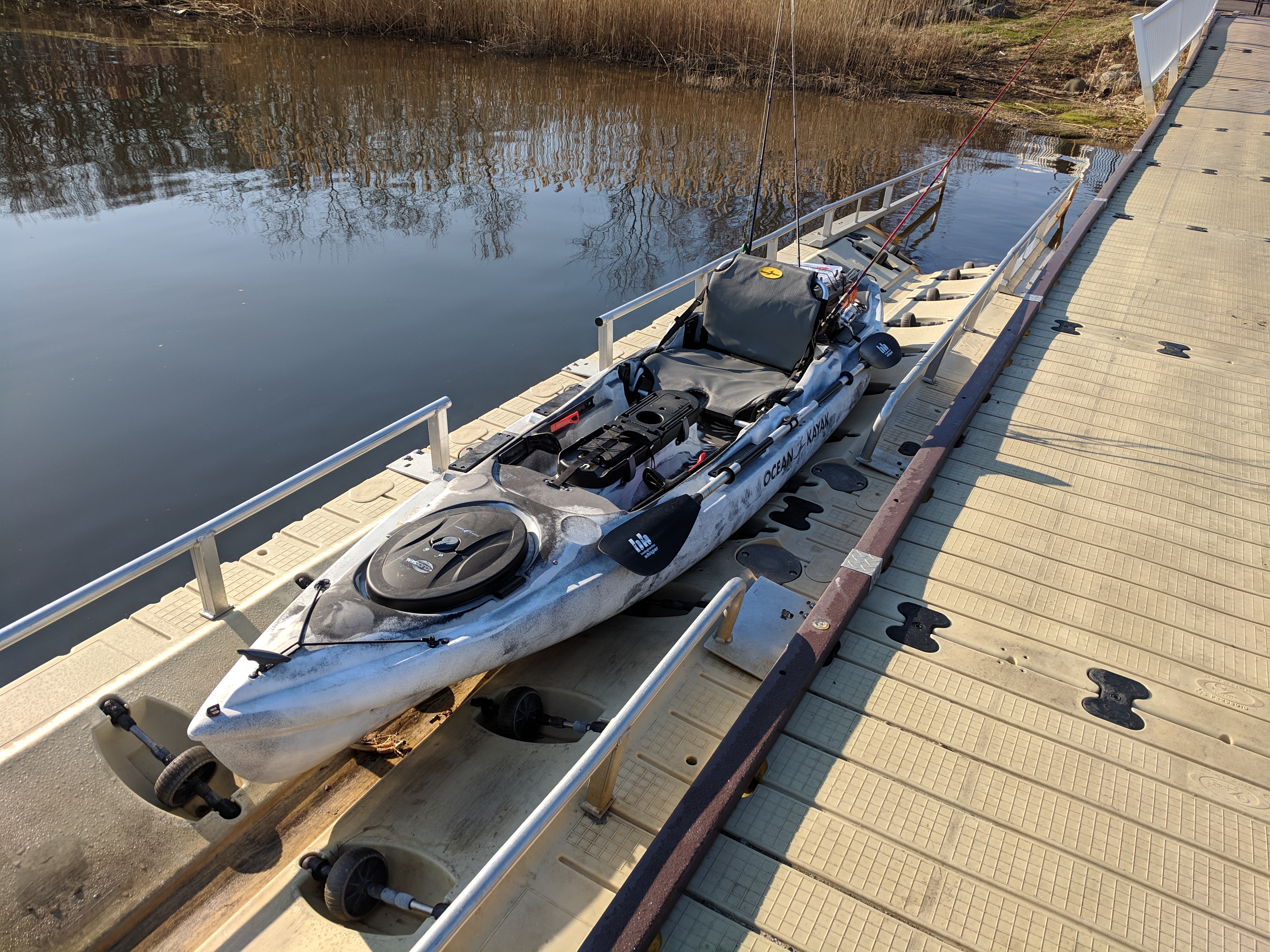
A fishing kayak ready to launch from the kayak dock at Lake Mercer, NJ.

Mercer Lake is home to many fish, including Largemouth Bass, White Crappie, Bluegill, Pumpkinseed Sunfish, Yellow Perch, Catfish, Shad, and Musky. In the past, the lake was stocked with Tiger Muskie. Fishing may be done from the banks or by use of a personal water craft.

In 2020 more fish have been caught in the first 6 months than in the past 5 years combined.
