= Lake Sylva =

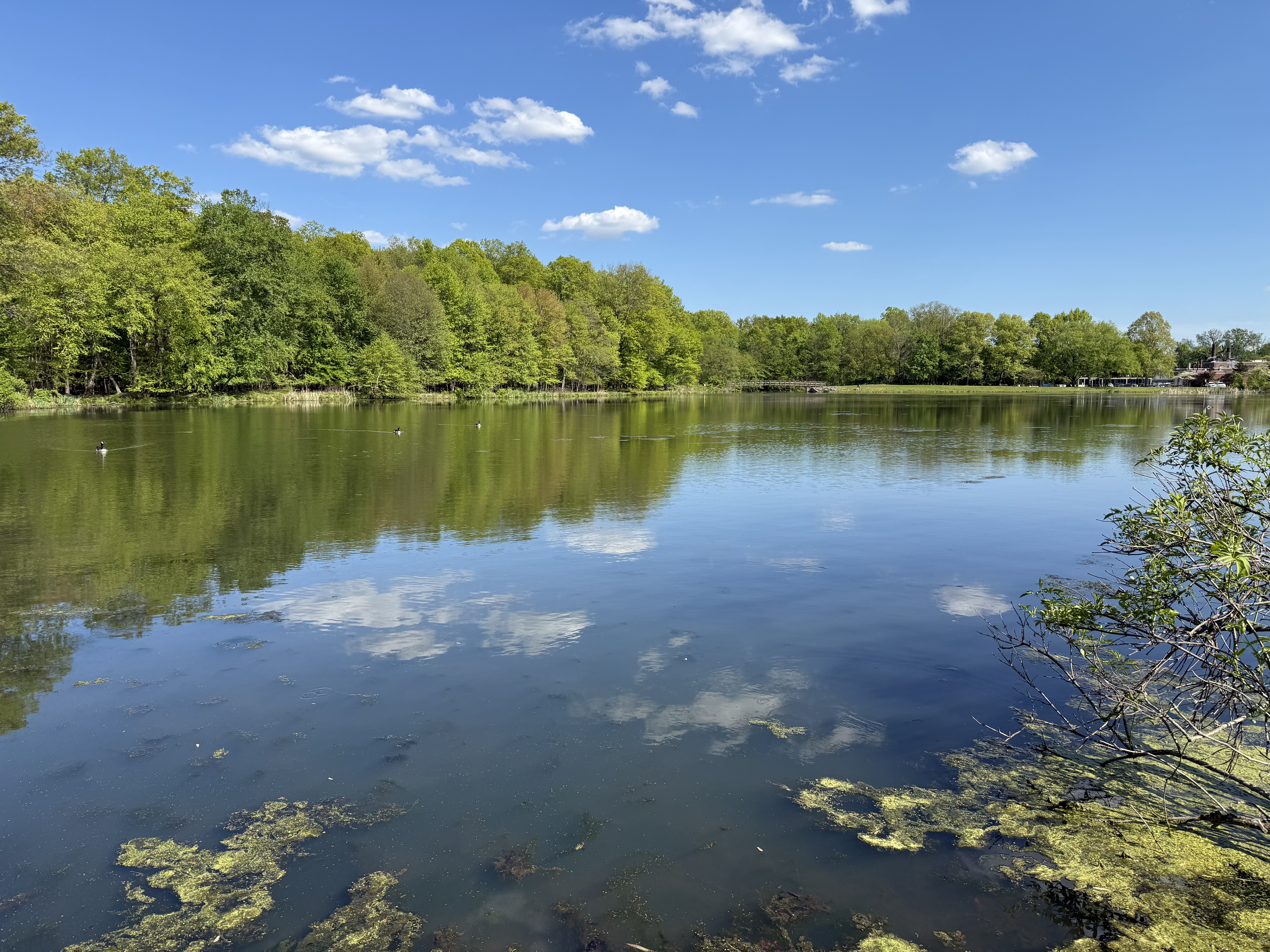
- Spring view southeast across Lake Sylva

- Location in New Jersey
- Location: Ewing Township, Mercer County, New Jersey
- Coordinates: 40°16′17.74″N 74°46′27.59″W
- Type: Reservoir
- Primary inflows: Shabakunk Creek
- Primary outflows: Shabakunk Creek
- Surface area: 11 acres (4.5 ha)
- Surface elevation: 85 feet (26 m)

Lake Sylva is an 11-acre man-made lake along the Shabakunk Creek on the campus of The College of New Jersey in Ewing, Mercer County, New Jersey, United States. The lake was created when an earthen dam was constructed across the Shabakunk in the 1920s by a local landowner, prior to the construction of the current college campus. It once contained several islands, but these were removed during a dredging project in 1988-1989. The lake is adjacent to Lake Ceva, and together the two lakes are the basis of the name of the Hillwood Lakes section of Ewing.
