= Charles D. Ravenel =

American politician (1938–2017)

Charles "Pug" Ravenel
- Born: Charles Dufort Ravenel; February 14, 1938; Charleston, South Carolina, US
- Died: March 25, 2017 (aged 79); Charleston, South Carolina, US
- Education: Harvard University
- Occupation: Banker
- Known for: Running in the 1974 South Carolina gubernatorial election
- Political party: Democrat
- Spouses: Mary "Mollie" Talbot Curtis (m. 1963; div. 1988); Susan "Susu" Heyward Gibbes Woodward (m. 1991)

Charles Dufort "Pug" Ravenel (February 14, 1938 – March 25, 2017) was an American politician and member of the Democratic Party from South Carolina who won the 1974 Democratic gubernatorial primary. Ravenel was the favorite to win the general election until the South Carolina Supreme Court ruled his candidacy invalid on the grounds that he did not meet the state's residency requirements. The eventual winner of the election was James B. Edwards, the state's first Republican governor in decades.

== Early life ==
Ravenel was born in Charleston, South Carolina. As a child he attended Cathedral Elementary School and Bishop England High School. Ravenel was given the nickname "Pug" after he ran into a telephone pole at Moultrie Playground. He worked as a newspaper courier for The News and Courier which helped him attend the Phillips Exeter Academy.

At Phillips Exeter and Harvard University, Ravenel played football as a quarterback. In 1961, he graduated from Harvard. Ravenel earned a Master's of Business Administration (MBA) from Harvard Business School in 1964. He worked for on Wall Street for the firm Donaldson, Lufkin & Jenrette, and served as a White House Fellow under President Lyndon B. Johnson. In 1967, he co-founded the New York Academy for Black and Latin Education (ABLE) with his friend Michael Bloomberg.

== Political career ==
In 1972, Ravenel moved back to South Carolina after working on Wall Street.

=== 1974 gubernatorial election ===
Ravenel's 1974 election platform to become governor of South Carolina, the “Program for Excellence in South Carolina," promised hope and change. His campaign was characterized as positive. He won a crowded Democratic gubernatorial primary and looked like a formidable general election candidate. But the South Carolina Supreme Court ruled that Ravenel failed to meet the five-year residency requirement in the Constitution of South Carolina. During the trial, Ravenel's decision to accept resident memberships instead of nonresident memberships at two separate clubs in Connecticut within the preceding five years was used against him. Ravenel was replaced as the Democratic nominee by the runner-up in the primary, Congressman William Jennings Bryan Dorn.

=== 1978 U.S. Senate election ===
Ravenel originally planned to run for governor again in 1978, but was convinced by Vice President Walter Mondale in 1977 to run for senator. He garnered over 50% of the vote in the primary and became the Democratic nominee in the 1978 United States Senate election in South Carolina, but failed to unseat incumbent Senator Strom Thurmond.

=== 1980 U.S. House election ===
In 1980, Ravenel was the Democratic nominee to represent South Carolina's 1st congressional district in the United States House of Representatives, but lost to Republican Thomas F. Hartnett. Ravenel's cousin Arthur Ravenel Jr. later became the district's representative as a Republican.

== Later life ==
After the end of his political career, Ravenel became associated with Charleston Trees, an organization that plants trees in Charleston. His focus was the beautification of East Bay Street on the Charleston peninsula.

In 1995, Ravenel pleaded guilty to bank fraud conspiracy for his involvement with the failure of Citadel Federal Savings Bank. He served his full sentence of 11 months and 17 days. Ravenel was pardoned by President Bill Clinton on January 20, 2001, Clinton's last day in office.

Party political offices
Preceded by John C. West	Democratic nominee for Governor of South Carolina; 1974	Succeeded by William Jennings Bryan Dorn
Preceded by Eugene N. Zeigler	Democratic nominee for US Senator from South Carolina (Class 2); 1978	Succeeded by Melvin Purvis
