= Shabakunk Creek =

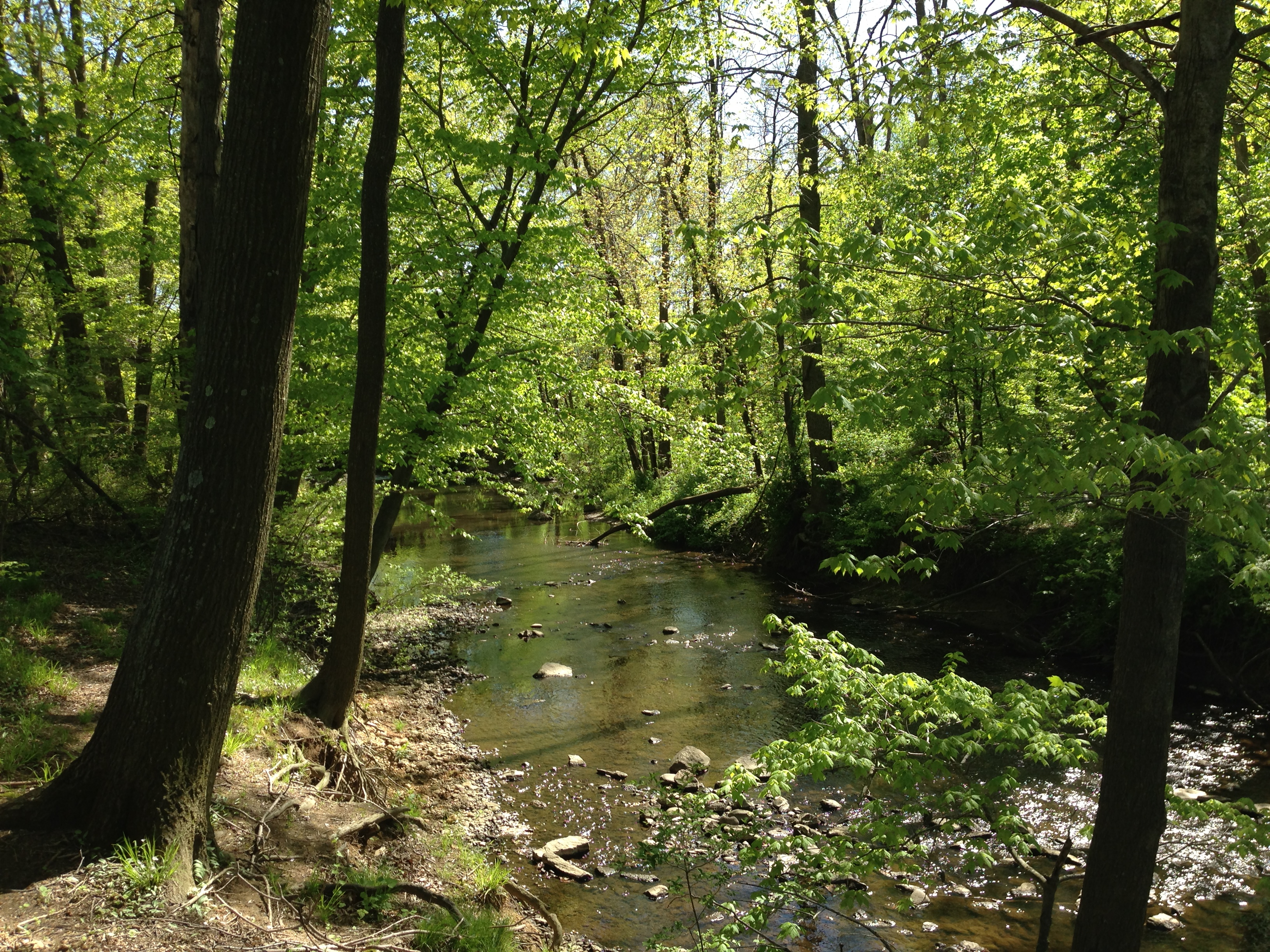
- The Shabakunk Creek below Colonial Lake

Location
- Country: United States
- State: New Jersey
- Region: Mercer County

Physical characteristics
- Source: The main branch
  - location: Hopewell Township
  - coordinates: 40°18′38″N 74°45′50″W
  - elevation: 217 ft (66 m)
- 2nd source: The West Branch
  - location: Ewing Township
  - coordinates: 40°16′50″N 74°48′49″W
  - elevation: 197 ft (60 m)
- Mouth: Assunpink Creek
  - location: Lawrence Township
  - coordinates: 40°14′58″N 74°43′9″W
  - elevation: 37 ft (11 m)

Basin features
- River system: Assunpink Creek
- Tributaries
  - right: The West Branch

The Shabakunk Creek is a tributary of the Assunpink Creek in Mercer County, New Jersey, United States. Via the Assunpink, its water ultimately flows into the Delaware River. The name Shabakunk is from the Lenape word meaning "shore land".

== Course ==
=== Main branch ===
The 7.9-mile-long (12.7 km) main branch of the Shabakunk Creek is born near what was once known as Twin Pine Airport in Hopewell Township. Flowing southwards, it flows under Pennington-Lawrenceville Road and then passes underneath Interstate 295, joining with the East Main Branch, which also originates in close proximity to the former Twin Pines Airport. After joining together with a third tributary, the Main Branch continues southward into Ewing, crosses underneath Bull Run Road and Ewingville Road, and enters the 11-acre Lake Sylva on the campus of The College of New Jersey.

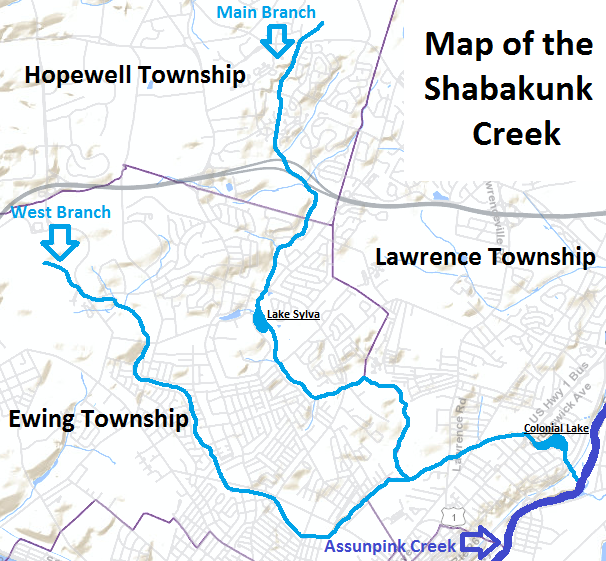
Map of the Shabakunk Creek

Below Lake Sylva, the Shabakunk flows southeastward, passing under Green Lane and then Ewingville Road for a second time. For a short distance it forms the border of Ewing and Lawrence townships before joining with the West Branch Shabakunk Creek, turning eastward and completely entering Lawrence. After passing underneath Lawrence Road, Princeton Pike and Brunswick Pike, the stream is impounded within Colonial Lake. Below Colonial Lake, the stream crosses underneath the Trenton Freeway and the Delaware and Raritan Canal before finally reaching its terminus at the Assunpink Creek.

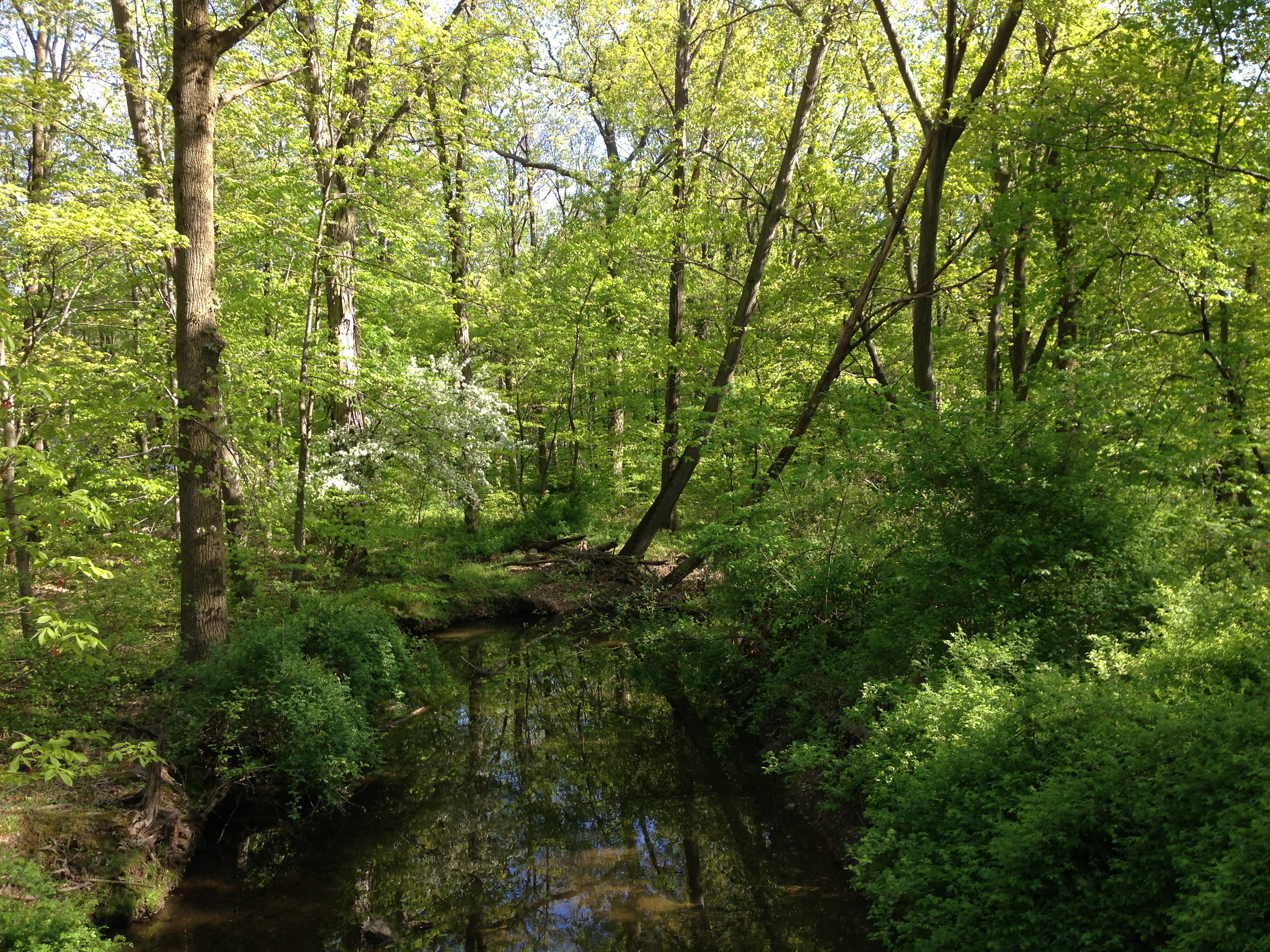
View southeast along the West Branch Shabakunk Creek from the Rutledge Avenue Footbridge.

=== West Branch ===
The 5.3-mile-long (8.5 km) West Branch of the Shabakunk Creek emerges from the airfield of Trenton-Mercer Airport in Ewing. From there, it flows generally southeastward, quickly joining with several small, unnamed tributaries while passing underneath the Delaware and Bound Brook Railroad (formerly owned by the Reading Railroad, now owned by Conrail), Scotch Road and Upper Ferry Road. It then passes underneath Carlton Avenue, Lower Ferry Road, Stratford Avenue, Central Avenue, North Olden Avenue Extension, Pennington Road, Parkside Avenue and Prospect Street. At this point, it turns northeasterly, passes under North Olden Avenue Extension again and finally flows underneath Spruce Street. Shortly thereafter it meets the main branch at the Ewing/Lawrence border. Much of the West Branch Shabakunk Creek's course between Pennington Road and Spruce Street is canalized due to heavy commercial development, with at least one structure built directly over the stream.

== History ==
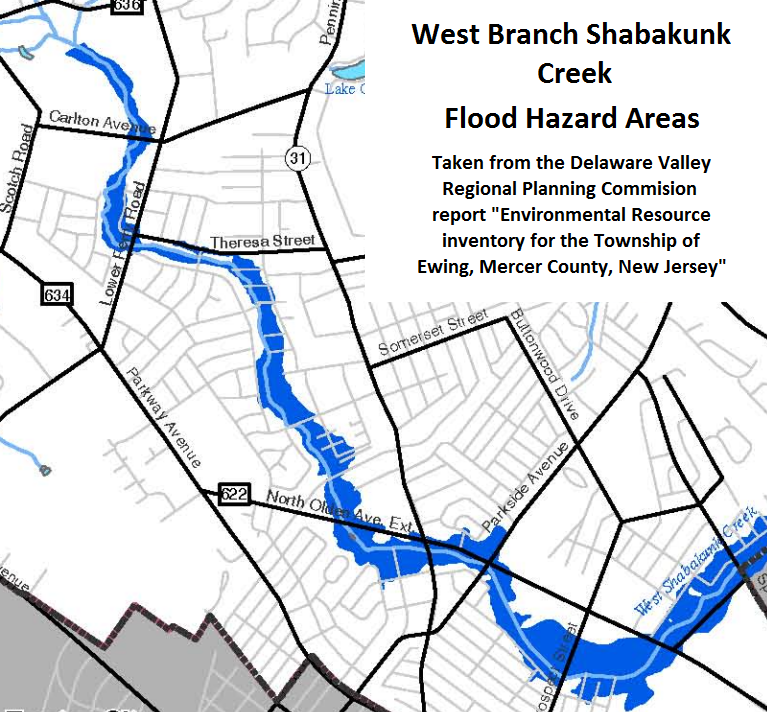
Map of flood hazard areas along the West Branch Shabakunk Creek in Ewing Township, produced by the Delaware Valley Regional Planning Commission in its report, "Environmental Resource Inventory for the Township of Ewing, Mercer County, New Jersey"

=== Revolutionary War ===
Under the command of Colonel Edward Hand, a successful delaying action was fought at the Shabakunk Creek near Lawrence Road which prevented British forces from reaching Trenton before nightfall on January 2, 1777. This skirmish was part of the Second Battle of Trenton.

=== 1996 flooding and associated improvements ===
On June 12, 1996, a 100-year flash flood occurred on the West Branch Shabakunk Creek in Ewing. Over 7 inches of rain fell in just 4 hours, resulting in $10 million in damages and $24 million in municipal overtime costs due to cleanup efforts (in 1996 dollars). Over 175 residences and 75 businesses were affected, and some businesses were closed for nearly 2 weeks due to the cleanup and repair of damage. As a result, a $4.2 million flood and erosion control project was initiated to stabilize the banks and create storm water detention basins along the more heavily developed central and southern portions of the creek's course.

== Environmental Impairment ==
=== Twin Pines Airport ===
All three of the tributaries of the Main Branch of the Shabakunk have their sources close to the contaminated lands of the Twin Pines Airport. Opened sometime before 1945, Twin Pines was an active regional airport for over 63 years, being open until 2008. For many decades the airport was extremely active, having dozens of planes stationed there, while hundreds of takeoffs and landings were recorded each week, for many years exceeding 100 per day. Although the Airport had a grass airstrip and its hangars and shops were one story wood plank structures, Twin Pines was a full service facility, offering complete maintenance services to its clients and visiting flyers, including oil and transmission fluid changes, lubrication and cleaning programs, as well as having three underground tanks, two for oil products and one for aviation fuel.

In 2008, as Hopewell Township was in the process of negotiating to buy all of the lands of Twin Pines, an environmental inspection by the New Jersey Department of Environmental Protection determined that much of the land of the Airport, especially areas bordering Lawrenceville-Pennington Road, where the Airport's hangars, workshops, and offices were located, were contaminated due to leakage from three underground petroleum product tanks. Upon removal it was determined that all three of the tanks had been leaking their contents into the ground on a long-term basis, and the underground plume of the leaked oil and aviation fuel was projected to have reached the grounds across Lawrenceville-Pennington Road, where the headwaters of the East Main Branch of the Shabakunk lay. The New Jersey Department of Environmental Protection's inspection also determined that there were multiple sites on the contaminated lands of the Airport where solid wastes, including, according to local residents, cans and containers that had been used to store oil, lubricants, transmission fluid, solvents, and other industrial fluids, had been dumped. Long-term residents living in the immediate area reported to independent river keepers who were monitoring the Creek's high mercury levels, that it had been the long-term practice of workers at the airport to dump cans and containers filled with changed-out oil and other aviation fluids, into holes and ditches that were dug both on the Airport's premises and across Lawrenceville-Pennington Road, in or near the fields where the sources springs and marshy areas of the East Main Branch of the Shabakunk Creek originated.

As of 2023, the area previously occupied by the Twin Pines Airport has for many years been repurposed as a public recreational area.

=== High Mercury and Methylmercury Levels in the Main Branch of Shabakunk Creek ===
Numerous studies and reports by various Federal, State of New Jersey and Local governments, as well as a number of universities and independent researchers' work, have continuously found over the years, up to the current round of reporting, that all branches of the Shabakunk Creek have medium to high levels of mercury and methylmercury. These reports and studies include annual publications by the United States Environmental Protection Agency, The United States Department of the Interior, and the New Jersey Department of Environmental Protection.

Ground water contamination from the Twin Pines Airport's leaking underground tanks and burying of petroleum and industrial fluid wastes are seen as being the main source of the high levels of mercury and methylmercury, as well as other heavy metals, that have been measured in the fish and bed sediments of the upper reaches of the Main Branch and of the Shabakunk Creek and its three tributaries which originate on or in close proximity to the contaminated lands of the Twin Pines Airport and the adjoining fields across Lawrenceville-Pennington Road. A study of the Main Branch of the Shabakunk, including testing of its upper tributaries found levels of mercury and methylmercury that were five and ten times higher than the upper ranges of allowable Federal Government levels, as was reported in a study of the Shabakunk Creek's mercury levels by the United States Department of the Interior.

== See also ==
- List of rivers of New Jersey
