= Colonial Lake =

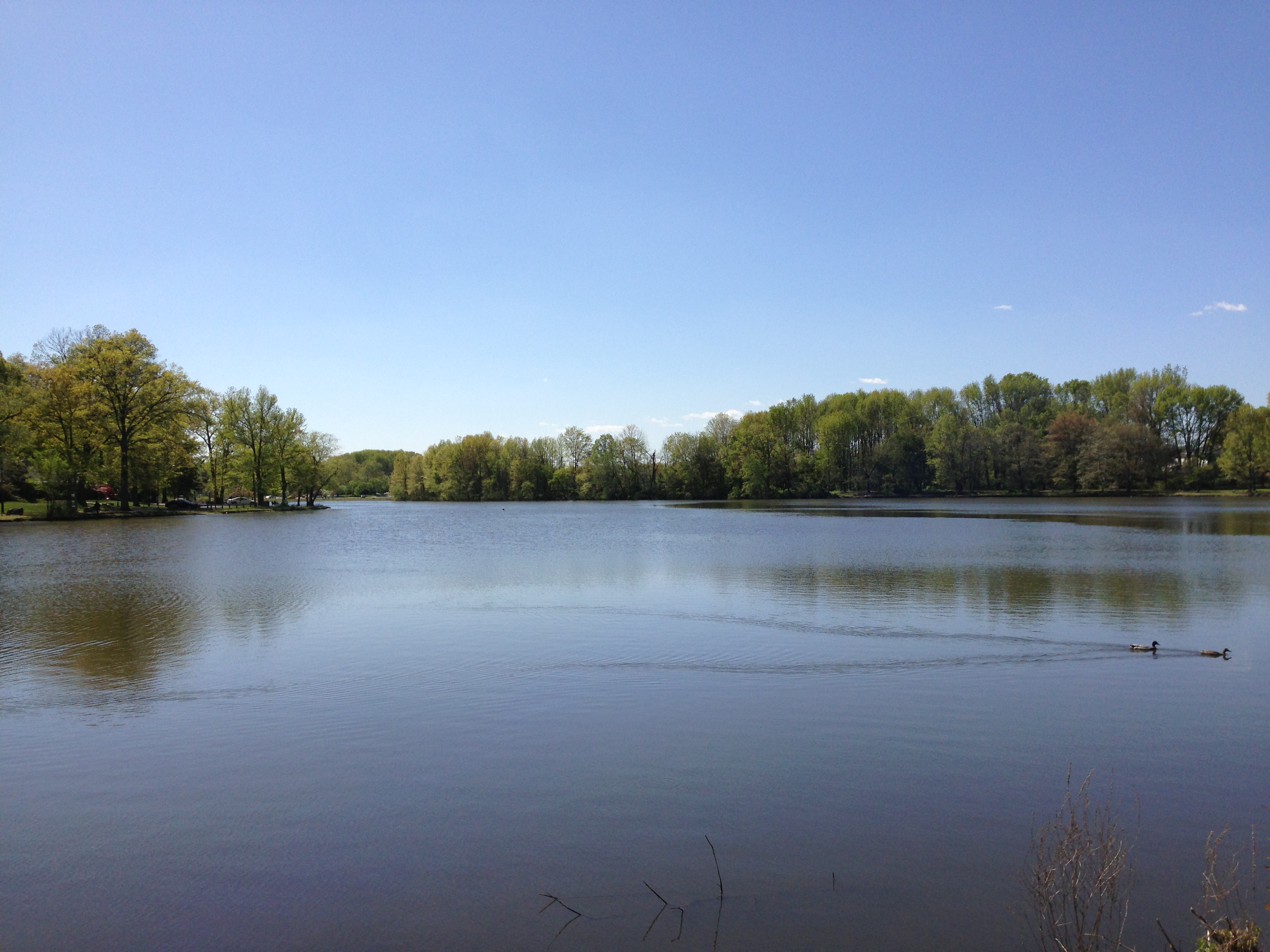
- View west across Colonial Lake

- Location in New Jersey
- Location: Lawrence Township, Mercer County, New Jersey
- Coordinates: 40°15′21.07″N 74°43′27.43″W
- Type: Reservoir
- Primary inflows: Shabakunk Creek
- Primary outflows: Shabakunk Creek
- Surface area: 25 acres (10 ha)
- Surface elevation: 49 feet (15 m)

Colonial Lake is a 25-acre (10 ha) man-made lake along the Shabakunk Creek in Lawrence Township, Mercer County, New Jersey, United States. It is located on Business Route 1 across from the Lawrence Shopping Center. The lake was created when an earthen dam was constructed across the Shabakunk in 1924 by local housing developers interested in providing recreation opportunities for a nearby development, which became known as Colonial Lakelands. The lake is currently the centerpiece of Lawrence Township's Colonial Lake Park.
