= Maurice Bessinger =

American restaurateur (1930–2014)

Lloyd Maurice Bessinger Sr. (July 14, 1930 – February 22, 2014) was an American BBQ restaurateur and politician noted for his defense of racial segregation.

== Early life ==
Bessinger was born in Orangeburg County, South Carolina on July 14, 1930, and served in the Army on the front lines of the Korean War, returning to the US in 1952.

== Piggie Park and Carolina Gold ==
The Maurice's BBQ signage

Bessinger, along with his brother Joe Jr., opened their first drive-in restaurant, Maurice's Piggie Park, in West Columbia, South Carolina in 1953. By 1968, he had four drive-ins, and by 2002 the chain had grown to nine restaurants. The South Carolina-style barbecue was and continues to be well-regarded, and Piggie Park has been included in multiple compilations of the best barbecue in the United States. On October 26, 2024, the Maurice's Barbeque offices, smoke pits and side factory in West Columbia caught fire and burned down. The restaurant and historic sign survived.

Bessinger also sold BBQ sauce under the Carolina Gold brand whose recipe included mustard, brown sugar, soy sauce, and vinegar. By 1999, this had become the largest BBQ operation in the United States.

Piggie Park restaurants were segregated, such that African-Americans were not allowed to eat inside the restaurants, until a lawsuit, Newman v. Piggie Park Enterprises, Inc. won an injunction in 1968.

=== Segregation lawsuit ===
In 1964, Anne Newman, the wife of an African-American minister, sued Piggie Park after Bessinger refused her entry to his restaurant. Newman sued under Title II of the Civil Rights Act of 1964, and won an injunction against the chain requiring them to stop refusing service to African-Americans. At the Supreme Court, this case also set a precedent assigning attorney's fees to someone who successfully sues for an injunction under the act.

=== Confederate flags ===
On July 1, 2000, the state of South Carolina stopped flying the Confederate Flag over the capitol, following a vote earlier that year. In response, Bessinger raised Confederate flags over his restaurants, also calling the flags "a real Christian symbol... fighting tyranny and terror and suppressive government."

A number of grocery chains responded by dropping his Carolina Gold sauce from their shelves. The Council of Conservative Citizens and the South Carolina Heritage Coalition responded with a call to boycott Wal-Mart, and Bessinger filed a lawsuit against Bi-Lo, Food Lion, Harris Teeter, Kroger, Piggly Wiggly, Publix, Sam's Club, Wal-Mart, and Winn-Dixie, arguing that their refusal to carry his products violated South Carolina's Unfair Trading Practices Act and intruded onto his right to free speech. Bessinger asked for $50 million in damages. The South Carolina Supreme Court rejected his claims in 2007.

After Bessinger's children took over the operation, they took down these flags, the last of them in 2013.

==== Orangeburg Location ====
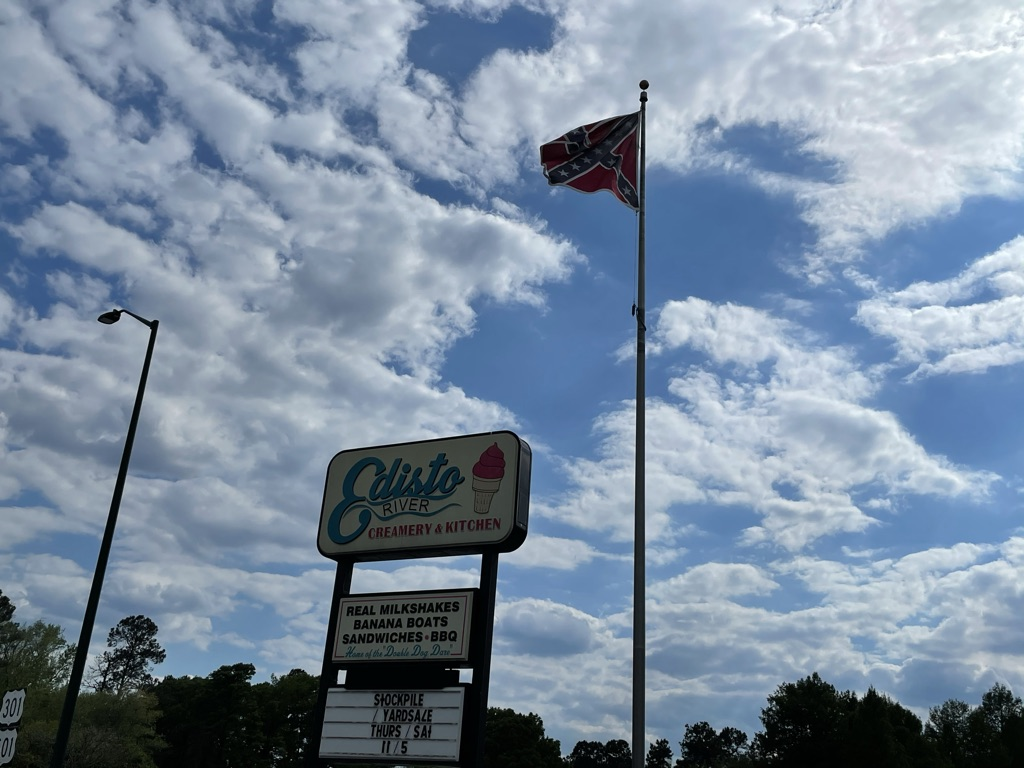
A Confederate Flag owned by the Sons of Confederate Veterans, which cannot be removed by the now-defunct ice cream parlor.

In 2014, Bessinger sold part of the Edisto restaurant property, approximately 130 square feet (including a flagpole and Confederate flag), to the organization Sons of Confederate Veterans Rivers Bridge Camp 842 for $5.

The remainder of the property, approximately 18,000 square feet, was sold in 2015 to Tommy Daras, who began operating a new restaurant called Edisto River Creamery & Kitchen.

Daras ignored the flag until "shortly after the massacre at Mother Emanuel, members of the Sons of Confederate Veterans showed up, took down the flag, and replaced it with a new one that was three times as big. “Before, I’d just sucked it up, but then it was, like, ‘Man, I’ve got to try to do something here,’ ” Daras said, explaining that he could no longer abide “this huge flag sticking up in the air telling everyone to screw themselves.” Daras – whose business suffered due to perceived association with the flag, yet was also criticized for wanting it gone – hired a lawyer to find a way to compel its removal. However, in 2017, the Orangeburg zoning board rejected the legal argument that the flagpole did not comply with the site's business zoning requirements.

In defeat, Daras put the restaurant property up for sale in 2019.

== Views on race and religion ==
Bessinger was a Baptist, and argued in Newman that requiring that he serve African-American customers was a violation of his religious beliefs.

Bessinger believed that "God gave slaves to whites", and claimed that South Carolina had had a gentler "Biblical slavery". In 2000, The State columnist John Monk wrote a column about the restaurants noting that one tract distributed by the restaurant, John Weaver's Biblical View of Slavery, argued against the idea that slavery is inherently evil, since it appears in the Bible.

Bessinger also notably opposed flying flags at half-mast following the assassination of Martin Luther King Jr., saying King had only been in Memphis "to stir hatred, violence, and discord."

== Politics ==
Bessinger ran for a seat in the South Carolina House of Representatives in 1964, only losing by a slim margin of around 100 votes. A 1974 run for governor was far less successful, drawing only 2.5% of the vote in the Democratic primary.

Behind the scenes, in 1964 he was Chairman of the George Wallace presidential campaign.

In the 1970s, he was also the chairman of the South Carolina Independent Party.

== Autobiography ==
In 2001, Bessinger published his autobiography, Defending My Heritage.

Writer Chuck Thompson's take on the book was negative, saying that "Bessinger's gasbagging autobiography is one of the most weirdly entertaining summations of the delusional cultural southern mind-set ever printed. My favorite line about growing up Southern: 'White people are the best friends, historically, that blacks have ever had.'"
