= Isaac W. Williams =

American activist (1945–2008)

- Isaac W. Williams (front) in a file photo from the 1960s.
- Born: 1945; Charleston, South Carolina, U.S.
- Died: U.S.
- Education: South Carolina State College (Biology)
- Occupation: Activist
- Years active: 1960s–2008
- Organization: NAACP
- Known for: Civil rights activism
- Notable work: NAACP activism, political campaigning
- Title: Field Director, NAACP South Carolina (1969–1983); Chief Congressional Aide to Rep. Jim Clyburn
- Movement: Civil rights movement

Isaac W. Williams (1945–2008) was an American activist with the NAACP.

== Early life and education ==
Williams was born the seventh child of eleven in the predominantly African-American Union Heights area of Charleston, South Carolina.

Williams graduated from Bonds-Wilson High School in Charleston County in 1963. He also graduated from South Carolina State College with a degree in biology. The Army ROTC commissioned Williams in 1967, and he served on active duty in the United States from 1967 to 1969.

== NAACP activism ==
=== Early civil rights movement ===
Williams was a prolific NAACP activist throughout his life, particularly during the civil rights movement of the 1960s. His participation in protest actions such as sit-ins resulted in his being jailed over 17 times during that time. His efforts focused on police use of force, inadequate minority housing, and minority education, among other things.

Williams's involvement with the NAACP started around 1960 when he was in tenth grade at Bonds-Wilson. At that time, he served as president of the North Charleston youth chapter of the NAACP. In a 2003 interview, he recalled arranging for civil rights lawyer Matthew J. Perry to give a speech for his chapter in 1960, describing it as a significant formative event for him.

During his college years, Williams served as the president of the NAACP's South Carolina Conference Youth Division from 1963 to 1967, as well as chairman of the NAACP National Youth Work Committee in the 1965–1967. In 1967, as senior class president, he led a student uprising at South Carolina State University (then South Carolina A&M College), protesting college president Benner C. Turner. The protest lasted two weeks and approximately 80% of the student body participated. Turner resigned in 1968 as a result of the pressure.

=== Later years ===
From 1969 to 1983, Williams was the Field Director of the NAACP in South Carolina.

In March 1982, Williams was arrested on gambling and drug charges with five other men following a raid on the home of his friend, Willie Fleming. The drug charges against all the men were dropped shortly after the arrests. The gambling charges were dismissed on April 27, 1982, but were refiled on April 29. Williams described the refiling as harassment and stated he felt the police were overreacting to the situation. Williams and his co-defendants were acquitted of all charges on June 18, 1982. He described it as a learning experience, stating it taught him a lesson about the amount of scrutiny that black leaders are under.

== Political campaigning ==
In 1991, Williams led the election campaign for Rep. Jim Clyburn. After Clyburn was elected, Williams served as his chief congressional aide. Williams held the position until his death from a stroke in 2008.
