= Mercer County Park =

Park in New Jersey, United States

Coordinates: 40.27°N 74.65°W

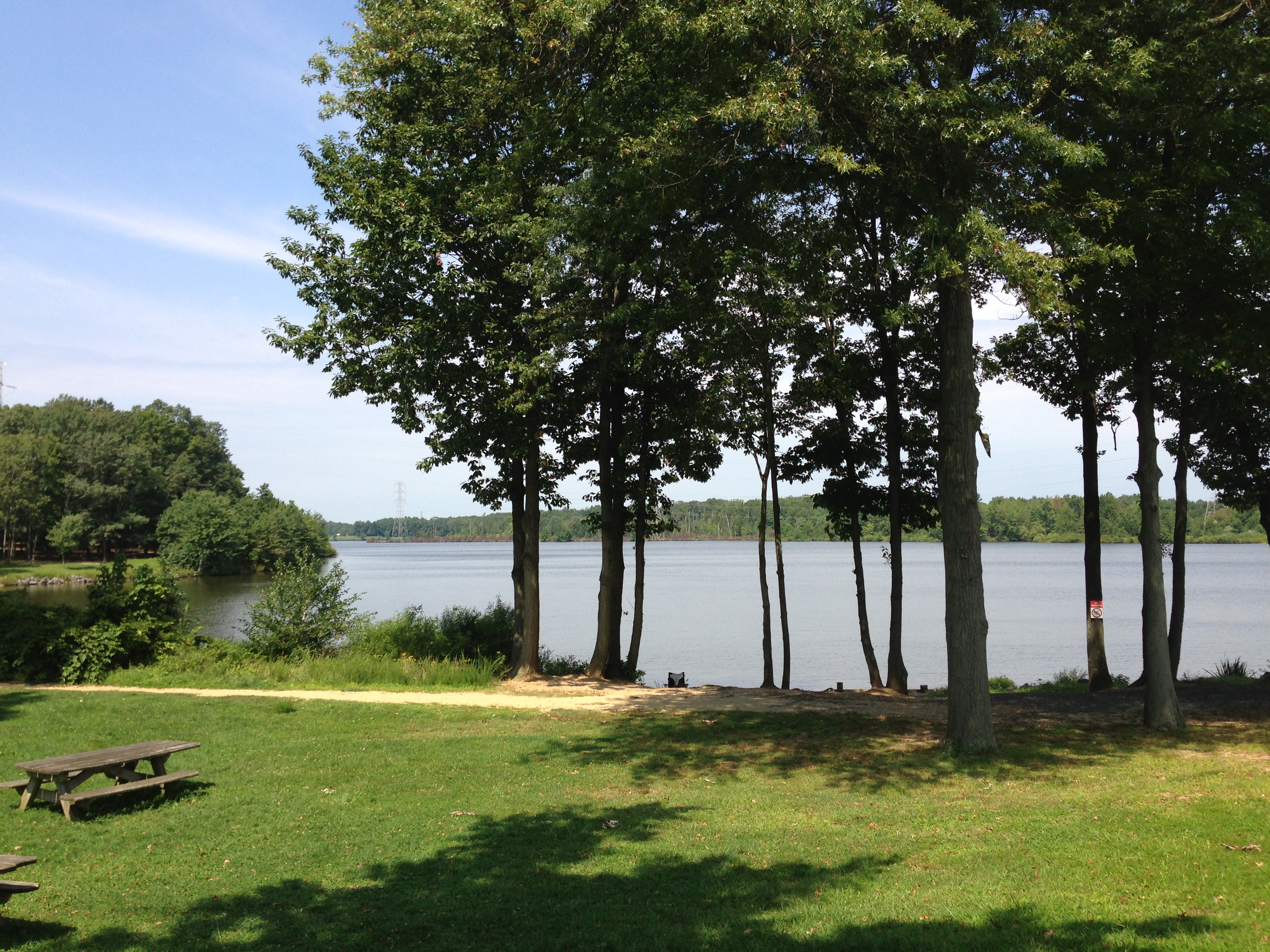
Picnic tables and the walking path along the Mercer Lake at the park

The Richard J. Coffee Mercer County Park is a recreational park located in West Windsor Township, with smaller sections extending into Hamilton and Lawrence Townships in Mercer County, New Jersey, United States. Originally and still more commonly known as Mercer County Park, the park was renamed in October 2009 in honor of New Jersey State Senator Richard J. Coffee.

The park encompasses over 2,500 acres (10 km^{2}) covering much of southern West Windsor, with portions extending into adjacent Hamilton and Lawrence. Mercer Lake, located within the park, is the home for the U.S. Olympic Rowing Team's training center. The National Softball Association honored the Mercer County Park Commission with its "Outstanding Parks Award" for the softball fields and facilities in Mercer County Park. It has served as the home field for the New Jersey Pride of the Major League Lacrosse for one game in 2004, 2005, and 2006. It has also hosted semi-professional Minor League Cricket matches.

== History ==
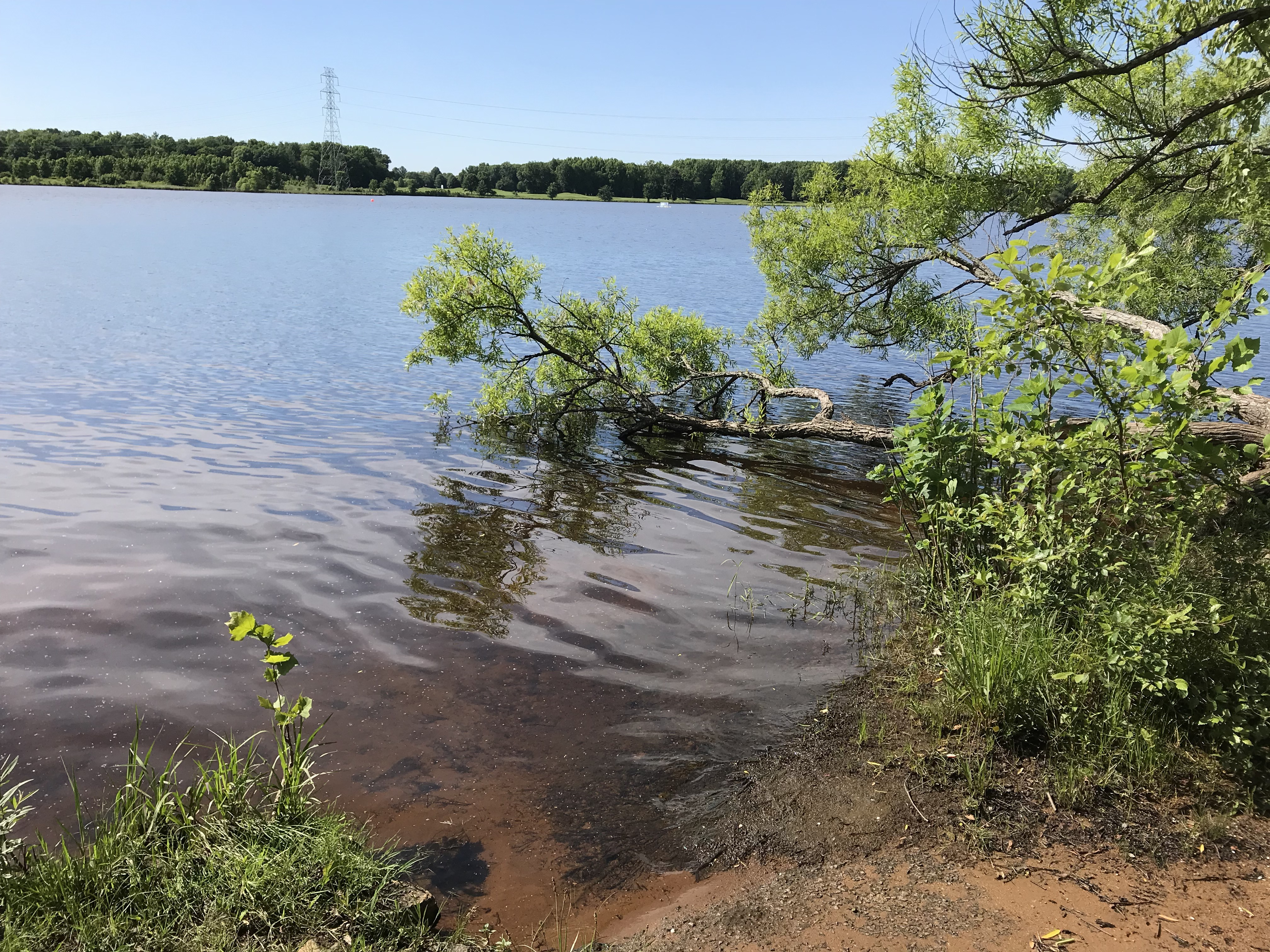
The shore of Mercer Lake and the park's golf courses across from it

The land was acquired between the late 1960s and the early 1970s. It consists of over 50 pieces of property, which include many farms. Ground was broken for the park in June 1971. Because of the construction of Routes I-95 and I-295, the lake basin was excavated and paid for by selling gravel to the highway contractors, which in turn helped excavate the basin now known as Lake Mercer.

== Facilities ==
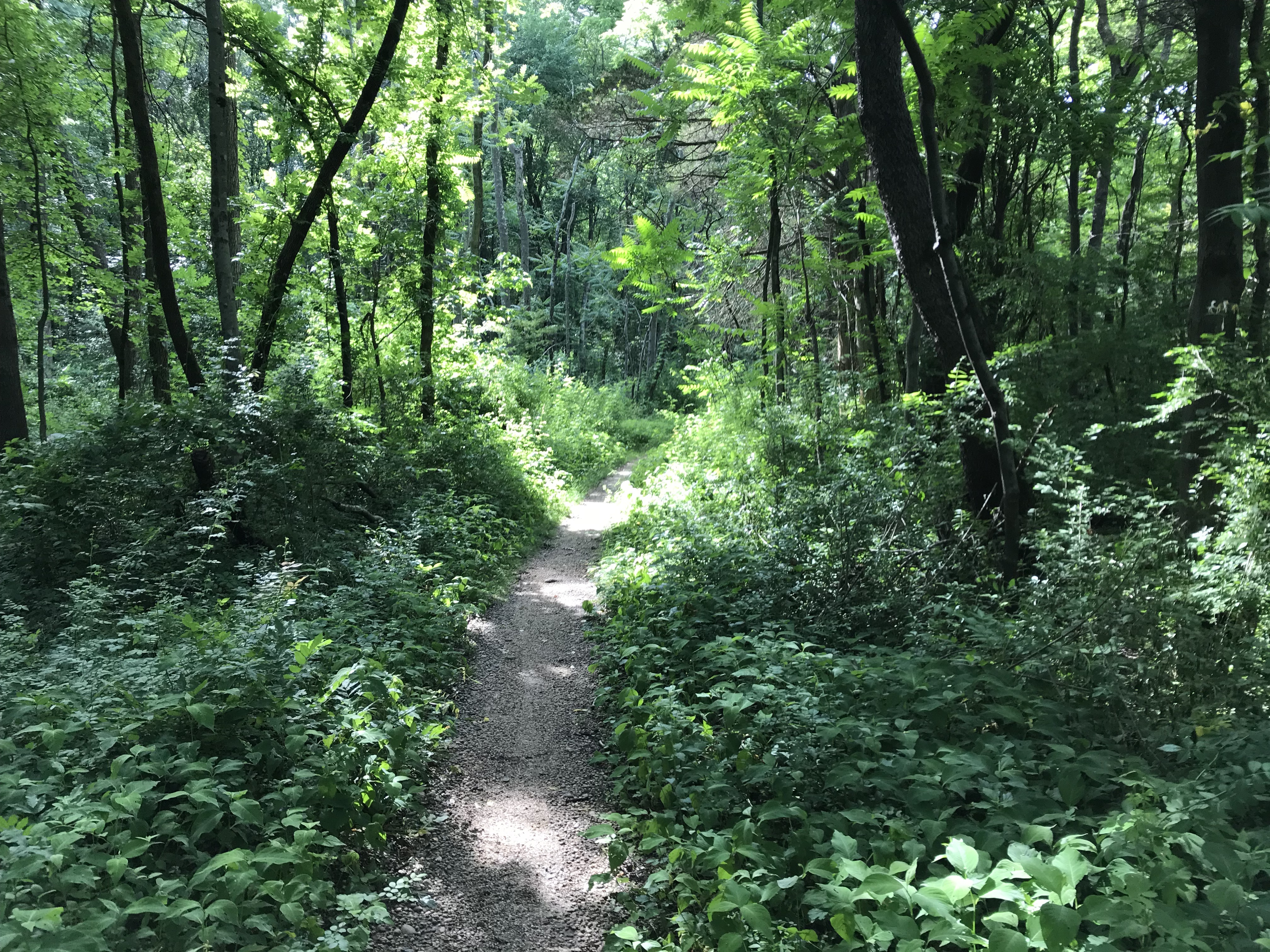
A mountain bike trail in the park

- 36 holes of golf (Mercer Oaks East and West)
- Seventeen athletic fields used for soccer, football, and lacrosse
- Ice skating center (home to the Mercer Bulldogs special hockey team )
- Tennis center (24 total courts - six of which are covered and are lit)
- Cross country course
- Mountain biking area
- Boat house/marina
- Finn Caspersen Rowing Center
- Crew course
- Nature trail
- Fishing
- Wildlife Center
- Hiking and jogging area
- 3-mile paved trail
- Picnic areas
- Dog parks
- Frisbee golf course
- Three sand volleyball courts
- Two cricket pitches
- Seven basketball courts
- Ten softball fields
- Veterans Memorial Park
- Parking facilities
- Seven washrooms
- 9/11 Memorial, a steel beam weighing one ton and ten feet long was given to the county by the Port Authority of New York and New Jersey in March 2011 and is now displayed at Mercer County Park to commemorate Mercer County victims who died in the September 11 terrorist attacks in Lower Manhattan.

== Events ==
The park is the home of numerous events in the summer known as the "Mercer County Summer Concert Series", hosting concerts through July and August. Mercer County Park follows up this time of year with different festivals as well as hosting events for the Special Olympics fall games.
