= Newman v. Piggie Park Enterprises, Inc. =

- Supreme Court of the United States

Argued March 7, 1968 Decided March 18, 1968
- Full case name: Newman v. Piggie Park Enterprises, Inc.
- Citations: 390 U.S. 400 (more) 88 S. Ct. 964; 19 L. Ed. 2d 1263; 1968 U.S. LEXIS 2168

Case history
- Prior: 256 F. Supp. 941 (D.S.C. 1966); 377 F.2d 433 (4th Cir. 1967)

Holding
- One who succeeds in obtaining an injunction under Title II of the Civil Rights Act of 1964 should ordinarily recover an attorney's fee under § 204(b) unless special circumstances would render such an award unjust, and should not be limited, as the Court of Appeals held, to an award of counsel fees only if the defenses advanced were "for purposes of delay, and not in good faith." Fourth Circuit reversed.

Court membership
- Chief Justice Earl Warren Associate Justices Hugo Black · William O. Douglas; John M. Harlan II · William J. Brennan Jr. Potter Stewart · Byron White; Abe Fortas · Thurgood Marshall

Case opinion
- Per curiam
- Marshall took no part in the consideration or decision of the case.

Newman v. Piggie Park Enterprises, Inc., 390 U.S. 400 (1968), is a 1968 United States Supreme Court case in which the court held per curiam that after a successful effort to obtain an injunction under Title II of the Civil Rights Act of 1964, attorney's fees under Section 204(b) are generally recoverable.

== Background ==
Piggie Park Enterprises was, in 1964, a drive-in BBQ chain with four restaurants, created and operated by Maurice Bessinger, the Baptist head of the National Association for the Preservation of White People. He did not allow African-Americans to eat in his restaurants. After Bessinger's refusal to allow Anne Newman, an African-American minister's wife into his restaurant, a lawyer, Matthew J. Perry, filed a class action lawsuit against the chain.

== Procedural history ==
Perry's lawsuit was first heard in the United States District Court for the District of South Carolina with Charles Earl Simons, Jr. presiding.

The plaintiffs argued that Piggie Park's exclusion of African-Americans constituted a violation of Title II. The defendant, Bessinger, denied the discrimination, denied that the restaurants were public accommodations in the meaning of the Act (as it did not involve interstate commerce), and argued that the Civil Rights Act violated his freedom of religion as "his religious beliefs compel him to oppose any integration of the races whatever." Simons held the Act did not apply to drive-in restaurants but applied to Bessinger's sandwich shop. On appeal, the Fourth Circuit reversed the lower court decision, finding that discrimination was prohibited at both drive-in and eat-in establishments, The Fourth Circuit remanded the case back to the district court, instructing that court to "award counsel fees only to the extent that the respondents' defenses had been advanced for purposes of delay, and not in good faith." The Supreme Court granted certiorari to the question of whether the exclusion for good-faith defense was correct.

== Decision ==
The Court held 8-0 (Marshall not participating) that full attorney's fees should generally be recoverable, based on the intent and practical effect of the law. The Court wrote:

When a plaintiff brings an action under that Title, he cannot recover damages. If he obtains an injunction, he does so not for himself alone, but also as a "private attorney general," vindicating a policy that Congress considered of the highest priority. If successful plaintiffs were routinely forced to bear their own attorneys' fees, few aggrieved parties would be in a position to advance the public interest by invoking the injunctive powers of the federal courts. Congress therefore enacted the provision for counsel fees -- not simply to penalize litigants who deliberately advance arguments they know to be untenable but, more broadly, to encourage individuals injured by racial discrimination to seek judicial relief under Title II.
It follows that one who succeeds in obtaining an injunction under that Title should ordinarily recover an attorney's fee unless special circumstances would render such an award unjust.

== Subsequent developments ==
This language has been said to form of a "cornerstone" for the text of the 1967 Attorney's Fees Act. Newman is seen as an early step in toward the Civil Rights Attorney's Fees Award Act of 1976 and more generally the American rule.

== See also ==
- Bouie v. City of Columbia: Supreme Court case involving a sit-in at a lunch counter in Columbia
- Katzenbach v. McClung: Supreme Court case desegregating Ollie's Barbecue Restaurant in Alabama
- List of United States Supreme Court cases, volume 390
