= Carolina Gold Drum and Bugle Corps =

Inactive Open Class competitive junior drum and bugle corps

Carolina Gold
- Location: Winston-Salem, North Carolina
- Division: SoundSport (DCI)
- Founded: 2000
- Executive Director: Jonathan Dulaney
- Championship titles: DCA Class A; 2012; 2018; 2019
- Website: www.carolinagold.org

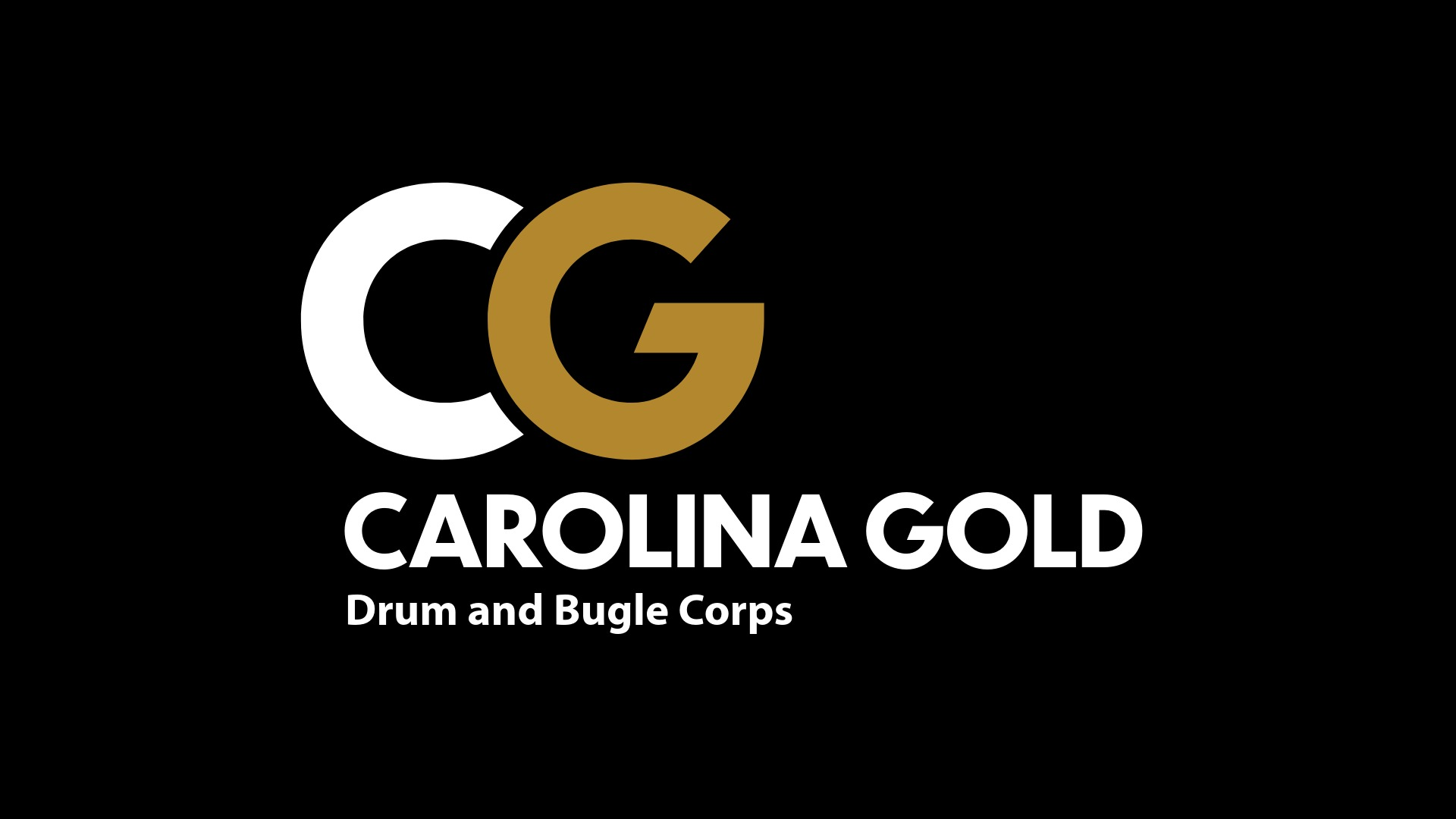

Carolina Gold Drum and Bugle Corps is a SoundSport drum and bugle corps. Formerly based in Rocky Mount and Greensboro in its earlier years, Carolina Gold is now based in Winston-Salem.

== History ==
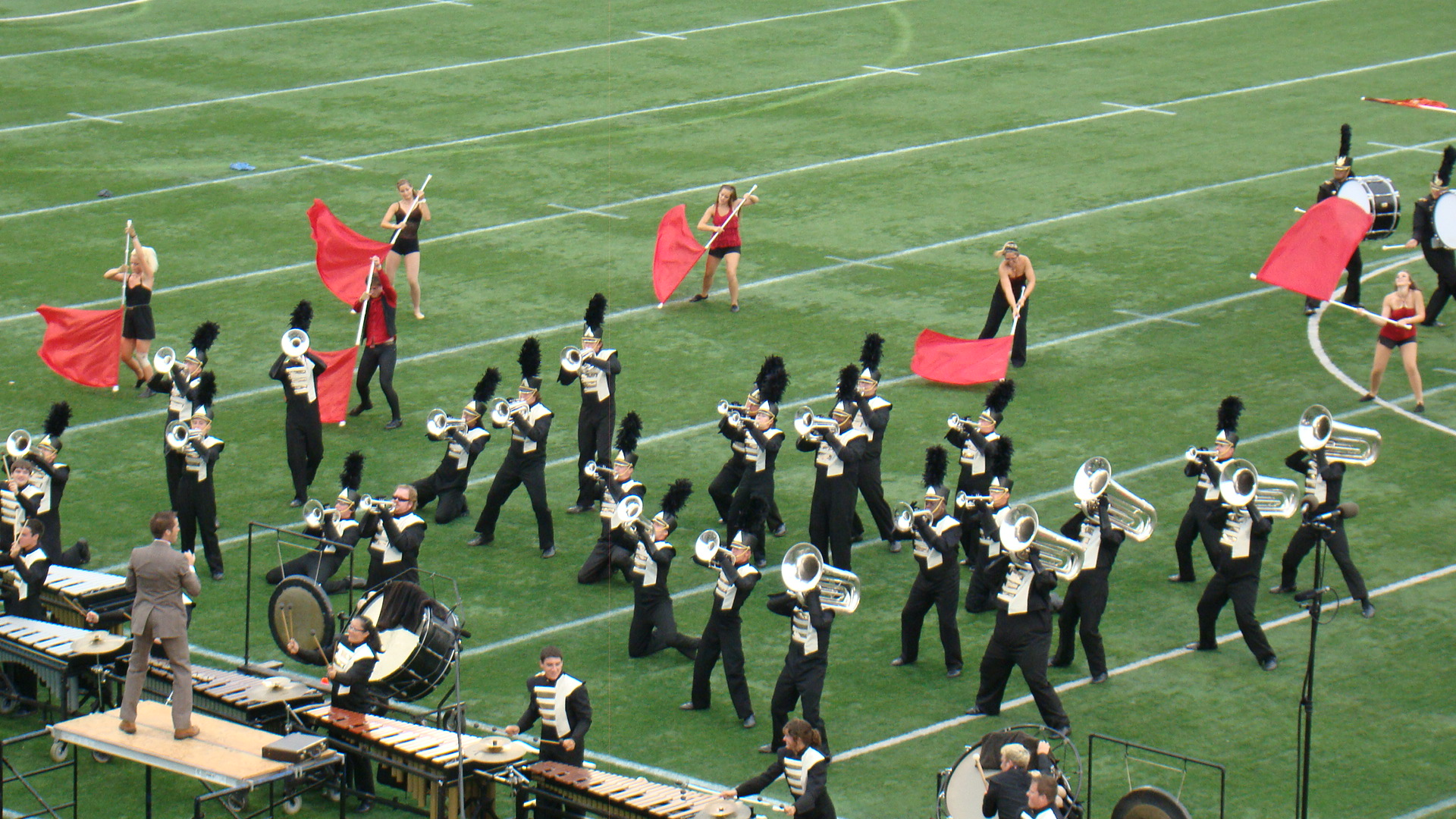
The 2011 Edition of Carolina Gold performing at the DCA World Championships in Rochester, NY

Established in the fall of 2000, the primary function of Carolina Gold is to provide a drum and bugle corps for the state of North Carolina. Gold strives to provide its performing members with a stimulating and rewarding instructional, competitive, and social experience. Performance units of this award-winning Corps consists of the horn line, the battery (drum line), front ensemble (pit), and a visual ensemble (color guard).

Carolina Gold members are a diverse group of high school and college musicians, band directors, business people, parents, coming from all walks of life. Members come from North Carolina, South Carolina, and Virginia with ages ranging from 16 to over 50 years of age. Experience levels range from high school through college band as well as drum and bugle corps experience on the DCI World Class level.

Carolina Gold finished in eighth place in Open Class at the 2005 DCA World Championships and in tenth place at the 2006 DCA World Championships in Rochester, NY. In 2009, Gold finished in fourth place in Class A at the 2009 DCA World Championships. In 2010, Gold placed third at the 2010 Championship along with receiving the High Percussion Award. In 2011, Gold once again finished third in Class A at the DCA World Championships and also won first place color guard and again won the Class A high percussion award. In 2012, Carolina Gold was crowned the DCA Class A World Champion. The Corps once again won first place color guard and first place percussion. For the first time in the Corps history, Carolina Gold won first place in the Brass and Visual captions.

After winning in A Class, Carolina Gold returned to Open Class and was a finalist in 2013 and 2014. In 2015, the corps provided the finals exhibition performance.

In 2018, Carolina Gold returned to the A Class classification, which proved to be a great move for the organization as the Corps placed first at finals and won all the scored caption awards.

In 2020, the corps made the change from an all-age corps to a junior corps and was approved to compete in Drum Corps International under the Open Class division, however the competitive season was canceled due to the COVID-19 Pandemic.

In 2021, the corps posted tentative audition dates for their upcoming 2021 season, but did not field an ensemble. The corps has been inactive ever since. In late 2024, the announced they were seeking to return as a parade corps and compete in the SoundSport division of Drum Corps International.

In 2025 the corps competed in the DCI SoundSport division, performing in Lexington, SC, Salem, VA (rain out), and the SoundSport International Music & Food Festival where they achieved a Silver rating their first year back.

In 2026, the corps competed again in the DCI SoundSport division, they preformed in South Carolina, Virginia, and at the SoundSport International Music & Food Festival where they achieved a gold rating.

== Show summary (2001-2020) ==
Year	Theme	Repertoire	Score	Placement	Class
2001	Revolution	Castle on a Cloud, Dog Eat Dog, At the End of the Day, Master of the House, Attack On Rue Plumet, Empty Chairs at Empty Tables, Valjean's Soliloquy, Do You Hear the People Sing & One Day More; All from Les Misérables	Did not compete		
2002	GOLDSpell: A Celebration of Life	"Prepare Ye", "Save the People", "We Beseech Thee", "Day by Day", "O Bless the Lord My Soul", "Alas Alas", "Finale". All selections from the musical "Godspell"	75.850	15th	Open
2003	LA Confidential: The Music of Cy Coleman	"Prolgue and Theme"(From City of Angels), "Dont Take Much & Use What You Got (from The Life), "My Friend" (from The Life), "Funny" (from City of Angels)	81.063	13th	Open
2004	Hanging with Dave	"Warehouse", "Dreaming Tree", "Too Much", "Kit Kat Jam", "Drive In, Drive Out"	81.088	11th (tie)	Open
2005	Reflections	"Summertime" (from Porgy and Bess), "Fascinatin' Rhythm" (from Lady Be Good), "I Got Rhythm" (from Girl Crazy), "Autumn Leaves", "Remembrance"	85.988	8th	Open
2006	Monster off a Leash: The Music of Tower of Power	"You're Still A Young Man", "What Is Hip", "You Cant Fall Up", "Mr. Toad's Wild Ride"	84.775	10th	Open
2007	Corps inactive				
2008	American Holidays	"New Years", "Gloria", "Chester Overture", "Halloween Medley", "Carol of the Bells", "5 Golden Rings"	75.888	8th	A
2009	Requiem	"Dies Irae" (from Days of Wrath), "Mass", "Agnus Dei" (from Adagio For Strings), "Lux Aeterna" (from Requiem for a Dream), "Joy" (from Awakening)	76.063	4th	A
2010	Primary Suspects	"Perry Mason Theme", "Prelude" (from Psycho), "North By Northwest", "Scene d'Amour", "The Trouble With Harry", "Death Hunt" (from On Dangerous Ground)	81.738	3rd	A
2011	A City Never Sleeps	"A New York State of Mind", "Metroplex", "Harlem Nocturne", "Blue Rhondo A La Turk", "Unsquare Dance", "Birdland"	83.850	3rd	A
2012	Out of the Shadows	"Suite No. 1 Opus 55 – Solveig’s Song", "Hall of the Mountain King", "Fix You" (by Coldplay), "A-Ha!" (by Imogen Heap)	82.600	1st	A
2013	Mission: Accepted	Original Music by Rob Stein, Justin Mabry, and Sean Combes	84.030	10th	Open
2014	The Darkest Hour	“Moonlight Sonata” (Beethoven) “Ballet Suite No. 4” (Shostakovich) “Night On Bald Mountain” (Mussorgsky) “Danse Macabre” (Camille Saint-Saëns) “Lacrimosa” (Mozart) “Sleepy Hollow” (Elfman)	85.200	9th	Open
2015	Let it Snow	Palladio (Karl Jenkins), "Let it Go", "L'inverno (Vivaldi), "The Frozen Cathedral" (John Mackey)	82.950	11th	Open
2016	Mirror Mirror	Lux Aurumque (Eric Whitacre), Fly to Paradise (Eric Whitacre), Man In the Mirror (Michael Jackson), Mirrors (Justin Timberlake), Joy (from Awakening) (Joseph Curiale), Harrison's Dream (Peter Graham), Serenada Schizophrana (Danny Elfman)	80.680	14th	Open
2017	So Into You	Repertoire unavailable	81.000	12th	Open
2018	Changing Directions	"Rocky Point Holiday" (Ron Nelson), "Take On Me" (Hidden Citizens), 'Orawa" (Wojciech Kilar), "One Man Show" (Jeff Beal)	82.55	1st	A
2019	Come One, Come All!	“Send in the Clowns” (Stephen Soundheim) “Little Suite for Brass” (Malcolm Arnold) “Sabre Dance” (Aram Khachaturian) “Dance of the Jesters” (Tchaikovsky) “Never Enough” From the Greatest Showman (Benji Pasek and Justin Paul)	84.225	1st	A
2020	Season cancelled due to the COVID-19 pandemic				
2025	A Golden Era	You're Still A Young Man", "What Is Hip", “Never Enough”, "From Now on" From the Greatest Showman	Silver		SoundSport
2026	Gold Rush 1799	"Gold" from Once (Steve Kazee) "The Ecstasy Of Gold" (Ennio Morricone)	Gold		SoundSport

== Winter Guard International ==
In the past few years, Carolina Gold has started three WGI groups.

=== Midas Winds ===
Midas Winds is Carolina Gold's Indoor Winds group. They compete in Independent Open. They are the first WGI winds group to be started by a drum corps They were originally known as The Carolina Gold Winds before they changed to Midas Winds. They have been inactive since the 2018 season due to a lack of membership.

Show Summary 2016–2017

Year	Theme	Score	Placement	Class
2016	One	86.575	2nd	WIO
2017	Pipe Dream	89.525	2nd	WIO

=== Alchemy Independent ===
Alchemy Independent is Carolina Gold's Indoor Percussion Group. They were founded in 2016 to provide an Independent Percussion Group to the Triangle Region of North Carolina. They compete in WGI and AIA as a Percussion Independent Open (PIO) group.

Show Summary 2017–Present

Year	Theme	Score	Placement
2017	The Light	86.700	16th
2018	Hidden Faces, Hidden Costs	82.500	27th
2019	The Other Side	80.150	30th

=== Legacy Independent ===
Legacy independent was Carolina Gold's Indoor Color Guard Program. They Competed In WGI and AIA as a Color Guard Independent Open (CGIO) Unit. As of 2019, they have combined with First Flight Winterguard from Cary, North Carolina.
