= New Jersey Route 18N =

Former state highway in New Jersey, United States

Route 18N

Route information
- Maintained by NJDOT
- Existed: 1923–1929

Major junctions
- South end: Route 10 (prior to 1927); Route 5 (after 1927) in Ridgefield
- North end: US 9W at New York state line at Alpine

Location
- Country: United States
- State: New Jersey
- Counties: Bergen (Hudson proposed)

Highway system
- New Jersey State Highway Routes; Interstate; US; State; Scenic Byways
← Route 18	→ Route 19

Route 18N was a state highway in New Jersey from 1923 to 1929, when it was renumbered as Route 1 and Route S1A. Route 18-N was defined in 1923 to run "from Hoboken to New York State line by way of Weehawken, West Hoboken, town of Union, North Bergen, Fairview, Ridgefield, Palisade Park, Fort Lee, Englewood-Cliffs, Tenafly and Alpine." The part from Hoboken to Fort Lee was not built or taken over as Route 18-N; it seems to follow the old Bergen Turnpike to Ridgefield and then Route 5 east. Route 18-N's south end was at pre-1927 Route 10, now Route 5.

In the 1927 renumbering, Route 18-N was kept, along with parts of pre-1927 Route 4, pre-1927 Route 5 and pre-1927 Route 8; a parallel road that is now County Route 501 was assigned the number Route 1. However, Route 1 was moved east to take over most of Route 18-N in 1929, and the southernmost part of 18N became Route S1A. Since the 1953 renumbering, that part of Route 1 has been only U.S. Route 9W and S1A has been Route 67.

== Route description ==
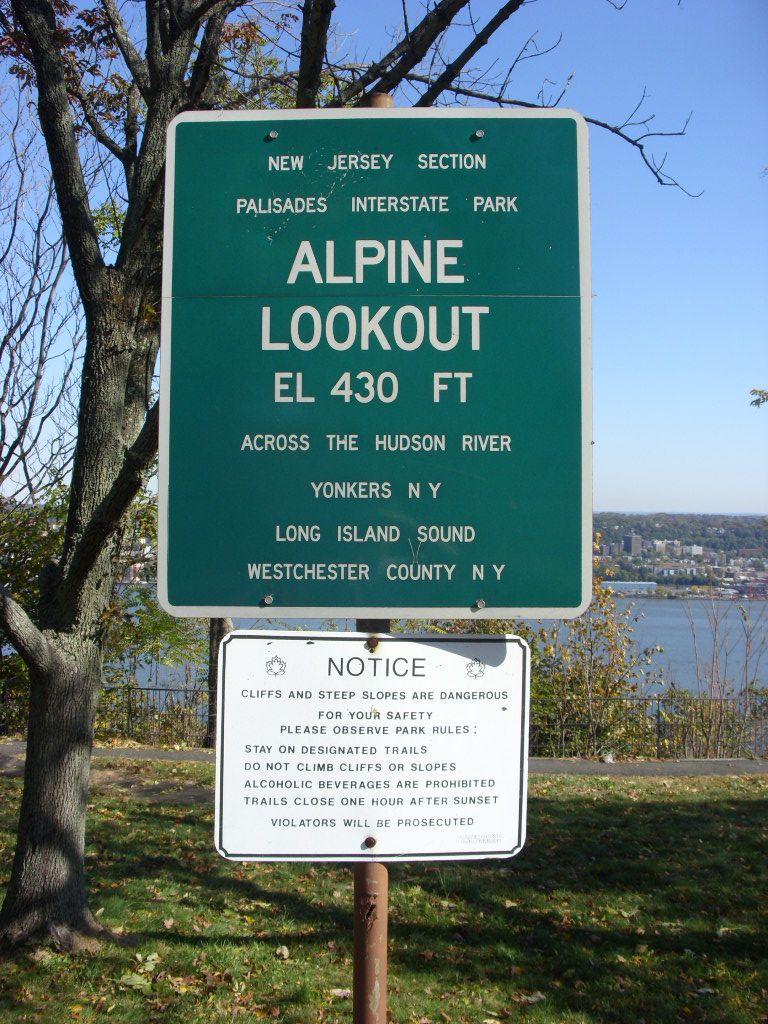
Alpine Lookout along the Palisades Mountains in Alpine

State Highway Route 18-N was to begin at a current day intersection with County Route 505 (Port Imperial Boulevard) in Hoboken. Route 18-N progressed northward along County Route 505 until the intersection with New Jersey Route 5 in the community of Edgewater. The highway went northwestward along the alignment of Route 5 to where it met New Jersey Route 63 and turned northward along Route 63 through the Ridgefields and Palisades Park to Fort Lee, where it would meet current-day U.S. Route 9W. Route 18-N continued along the current-day abandoned alignment of U.S. Route 9W, where the highway passed along the cliffs of the Palisades until crossing the state line into New York near Alpine.

== History ==
State Highway Route 18-N was first designated in the 1923 Annual Report on Public Roads as running from the city of Hoboken northward through several communities in Bergen and Hudson County to the New York state line at Alpine. The highway was an addition to the original system designed by the New Jersey Commissioner of Public Roads in 1916, which started with thirteen state highways. The portion from Hoboken to Fort Lee was never officially taken over by the New Jersey State Highway Department, as when the 1927 state highway renumbering occurred, the alignment of Route 18-N south of Fort Lee had already wiped, but the designation was retained from the Fort Lee to the state line in Alpine. Route 18-N was one of four -N suffixes retained in the 1927 renumbering, however, Route 18-N was the first to be eliminated, when the new New Jersey Route 1 was realigned onto Route 18-N in a minor change in 1929. This former alignment of Route 18-N through the Palisades Cliffs has since been abandoned and was part of the Long Path, a hiking trail and scenic overlook as Old Route 9W until the Long Path was realigned on April 1, 2009.

== Major intersections ==
County	Location	mi	km	Destinations	Notes
Hudson	Union City	0.00	0.00	Route 10	Southern terminus of State Highway Route 18-N
Bergen	Fort Lee			US 9W	Begin/end concurrency with U.S. Route 9W
Bergen	Alpine			US 9W	New York state line; Begin/end concurrency with U.S. Route 9W
1.000 mi = 1.609 km; 1.000 km = 0.621 mi

== See also ==
- New Jersey Route 53, New Jersey Route 71 and New Jersey Route 284 - the other holdovers during the 1927 renumbering
