= List of state highways in New Jersey =

- Standard route signage in New Jersey

Highway names
- Interstates: Interstate X (I-X)
- US Highways: U.S. Route X (US X)
- State: Route X

System links
- New Jersey State Highway Routes; Interstate; US; State; Scenic Byways

The following is a list of state highways in the U.S. state of New Jersey.

== List of routes ==
Number	Length (mi)	Length (km)	Southern or western terminus	Northern or eastern terminus	Formed	Removed	Notes
Route 1	—	—	—	—	1927	1953	
Route S1	—	—	—	—	1927	1953	
Route S1A	—	—	—	—	1929	1953	
Route 2	—	—	—	—	1927	1942	
Route 2N	—	—	—	—	1938	1953	
Route 3	10.84	17.45	US 46 in Clifton	US 1/9 in North Bergen	1927	current	
Route S3	—	—	—	—	1929	1953	
Route S3 Spur	—	—	—	—	1948	1953	
Route 4	10.83	17.43	McLean Boulevard (Route 20) in Paterson	I-95, US 1/9, US 46, and US 9W in Fort Lee	1916	current	
Route 4A	—	—	—	—	—	1953	
Route 4N	—	—	—	—	1927	1953	
Route 4 Parkway	—	—	—	—	1947	1953	
Route S4	—	—	—	—	1927	1953	
Route S4A	—	—	—	—	1927	1953	
Route S4B	—	—	—	—	1929	1953	
Route S4C	—	—	—	—	1929	1953	
Route S4D	—	—	—	—	1938	1953	
Route 5	3.18	5.12	Broad Avenue (US 1/9) in Ridgefield	River Road (CR 505) in Edgewater	1927	current	
Route 5N	—	—	—	—	1927	1953	
Route S5	—	—	—	—	1927	1953	
Route 6	—	—	—	—	1927	1953	
Route 6A	—	—	—	—	1927	1953	
Route 6M	—	—	—	—	1941	1953	
Route S6	—	—	—	—	1929	1953	
Route 7	9.46	15.22	US 1/9, Truck US 1/9, and Route 139 in Jersey City	Kingsland Road on the Nutley/Clifton border	1927	current	Two separate segments
Route 8	—	—	—	—	1927	1953	
Route 8N	—	—	—	—	1927	1942	
Route 9	—	—	Pine Brook	Belleville	1927	c. 1953	became Route 16
Route 10	23.51	37.84	US 46 in Roxbury	Mt Pleasant Avenue (CR 577) and Prospect Avenue (CR 577) in West Orange	1927	current	
Route 10N	—	—	—	—	1927	1938	
Route 11	—	—	US 22 (old Route 28) in Readington	US 22 (old Route 29) in Warren Township	1927	—	Unbuilt; Was to have been a non-interstate version of I-78
Route 11N	—	—	—	—	1927	1939	
Route 12	11.69	18.81	Uhlerstown–Frenchtown Bridge in Frenchtown	US 202/Route 31 in Flemington	1927	current	
Route 13	0.56	0.90	Bridge Avenue (CR 632) in Point Pleasant	Bridge Avenue (CR 632) in Bay Head	1953	current	
Route 13E	—	—	—	—	1938	1953	
Route 14	25.0	40.2	Route 23 in Butler	New York state line in Alpine	c. 1960	c. 1975	
Route 15	19.51	31.40	West McFarland Street (US 46) in Dover	US 206 and Sussex Road (CR 565) in Frankford Township	1953	current	Two separate segments
Route 16	—	—	Pine Brook	Belleville	1953	—	never built
Route 17	27.20	43.77	Belleville Turnpike (Route 7/CR 507) on the Kearny/North Arlington border	I-287/NY 17 at the New York state line in Mahwah	1942	current	
Route 18	47.92	77.12	Route 138 in Wall Township	I-287 in Piscataway	1939	current	Connection to northbound I-287 technically designated as Route 18 Spur
Route 18N	—	—	—	—	1927	1929	
Route 19	—	—	Paterson	Belleville	1939	1948	
Route 19	3.04	4.89	Broad Street (CR 509) in Clifton	Main Street (CR 509) in Paterson	1988	current	
Route 20	4.15	6.68	US 46 in Clifton	River Street (CR 504) in Paterson	1953	current	
Route 21	14.35	23.09	US 1/9 and US 22 in Newark	US 46 in Clifton	1927	current	
Route 21A	—	—	Route 21 in Newark	Route 7 in Belleville	1953	c. 1969	
Route 22	—	—	—	—	1927	1953	
Route 23	52.63	84.70	Bloomfield Avenue (CR 506) and Prospect Avenue (CR 577) in Verona	Clove Road (CR 15) at the New York state line in Montague Township	1927	current	
Route 24	10.42	16.77	I-287 in Hanover Township	I-78 in Springfield	1927	current	
Route S24	—	—	—	—	1927	1953	
Route 25	—	—	—	—	1927	1953	
Route 25A	—	—	—	—	1939	1953	
Route 25AD	—	—	—	—	1939	1953	
Route 25B	—	—	—	—	1939	1953	
Route 25M	—	—	—	—	1940	1953	
Route 25T	—	—	—	—	1933	1953	
Route S25	—	—	—	—	1927	1953	
Route 26	2.57	4.14	US 1 in North Brunswick	Livingston Avenue (CR 691) in New Brunswick	1927	current	
Route 26A	—	—	—	—	1941	1953	
Route S26	—	—	—	—	1927	1953	
Route 27	38.53	62.01	Stockton Street (US 206) and Bayard Lane (US 206) in Princeton	McCarter Highway (Route 21) and Broad Street in Newark	1927	current	
Route 28	26.44	42.55	US 22 in Bridgewater	Chilton Street (Route 27) in Elizabeth	1927	current	
Route 28A	—	—	—	—	1952	1953	
Route S28	—	—	—	—	1927	1953	
Route 29	34.71	55.86	I-195 and I-295 in Hamilton	Bridge Street (Route 12) and Race Street (Route 12) in Frenchtown	1927	current	
Route 29A	—	—	—	—	1927	1953	
Route 29B	—	—	Route 29A in Frenchtown	Route 28 in Alpha	1938	1953	
Route 30	—	—	—	—	1927	1953	
Route 31	—	—	—	—	1927	1953	
Route 31	48.93	78.75	North Broad Street (US 206) in Trenton	US 46 in White Township	1967	current	
Route 31A	—	—	—	—	1938	1953	
Route S31	—	—	—	—	1927	1953	
Route 32	—	—	—	—	1927	1953	
Route 32	1.18	1.90	US 130 in South Brunswick	New Jersey Turnpike (I-95) and Forsgate Drive (CR 612) in Monroe Township	1964	current	
Route 33	42.03	67.64	US 1 in Trenton	Main Street (Route 71) in Neptune	1927	current	
Route 33 Bus.	6.89	11.09	Route 33 in Manalapan	Route 33 in Howell	1990	current	
Route 33 Byp.	—	—	Route 33 in Freehold Township	Route 33 in Freehold Township	c. 1988	1990	
Route 33A	3.62	5.83	Route 33 in Tinton Falls	Route 35 in Neptune	—	1953	
Route 34	26.79	43.11	Route 35 and Route 70 in Wall Township	US 9 in Old Bridge	1927	current	
Route 35	58.07	93.45	Island Beach State Park in Berkeley Township	St. Georges Avenue (Route 27) in Rahway	1927	current	
Route 36	24.40	39.27	Garden State Parkway and Hope Road (CR 51) on the Eatontown/Tinton Falls border	Route 35 and the Garden State Parkway in Keyport	1927	current	
Route 37	13.43	21.61	Route 70 in Lakehurst	Route 35 in Seaside Heights	1927	current	
Route 38	19.19	30.88	US 30, US 130 and Kaighns Avenue (CR 607) in Pennsauken	US 206 and South Pemberton Road (CR 530) in Southampton	1927	current	
Route 39	—	—	—	—	1927	1953	
Route S39	—	—	—	—	1941	1953	
Route 40	—	—	—	—	1927	1953	
Route S40	—	—	—	—	1927	1953	
Route 41	14.08	22.66	Delsea Drive (Route 47), Blackwood–Barnsboro Road (CR 603), and Egg Harbor Road (CR 630) in Deptford	Kings Highway (CR 611) in Maple Shade	1927	current	
Route S41	—	—	—	—	1927	1953	
Route S41A	—	—	—	—	1938	1953	
Route S41N	—	—	—	—	1927	1953	
Route 42	14.28	22.98	Black Horse Pike (US 322) and Sicklerville Road (CR 536 Spur) in Monroe Township	I-76 and I-295 in Bellmawr	1927	current	
Route 43	—	—	—	—	1927	1953	
Route 43	2.35	3.78	South Egg Harbor Road (CR 561) and Hay Road (CR 726) in Winslow Township	Old White Horse Pike (CR 716) in Winslow Township	1955	1988	
Route S43	—	—	—	—	1938	1953	
Route 44	10.28	16.54	Barker Avenue in Logan Township	I-295/US 130, and Delaware Street (CR 640) in West Deptford	1927	current	
Route 44T	—	—	Pennsylvania state line in Paulsboro	Black Horse Pike (Route 42) in Monroe Township	1938	1953	
Route S44	—	—	—	—	1937	1953	
Route S44A	—	—	—	—	1938	1953	
Route 45	28.51	45.88	West Broadway (Route 49) and East Broadway (Route 49) in Salem	US 130 in Westville	1927	current	
Route 45M	—	—	—	—	—	1944	
Route 46	—	—	—	—	1927	1953	
Route 47	75.20	121.02	Atlantic Avenue in Wildwood	US 130/CR 551 and Creek Road (CR 753) in Brooklawn	1927	current	Longest signed state route in New Jersey
Route 47 Alt.	8.58	13.81	Route 47 in Dennis Township	Route 47 in Maurice River	—	c. 1990	
Route 48	4.26	6.86	Virginia Avenue (US 130) in Penns Grove	Harding Highway (US 40) in Carneys Point	1927	current	
Route 49	53.80	86.58	I-295/US 40 and US 130 in Pennsville	Route 50/CR 557 in Upper Township	1927	current	
Route S49	—	—	—	—	1927	1953	
Route 50	26.02	41.88	US 9 and the ramp to the Garden State Parkway in Upper Township	White Horse Pike (US 30) in Egg Harbor City	1927	current	
Route 51	—	—	—	—	1939	1953	
Route 51	—	—	I-76 in Camden	US 30	1967	—	never built
Route 52	2.74	4.41	Bay Avenue (CR 656) in Ocean City	New Road (US 9) in Somers Point	1937	current	
Route 53	4.66	7.50	Littleton Road (US 202) in Morris Plains	US 46 in Denville	1953	current	
Route 54	11.86	19.09	Harding Highway (US 40) on the Buena/Buena Vista Township border	White Horse Pike (US 30) and US 206 in Hammonton	1938	current	
Route 55	—	—	—	—	1938	1948	
Route 55	—	—	I-95 in Teaneck	New York state line	1948	1964	unbuilt New Jersey Turnpike extension
Route 55	40.54	65.24	Route 47 in Maurice River	Route 42 in Deptford	1964	current	
Route 56	—	—	—	—	1938	1953	
Route 56	9.19	14.79	Route 77 in Upper Deerfield Township	Delsea Drive (Route 47) in Vineland	1983	current	
Route S56	—	—	—	—	1927	1953	
Route 60	—	—	—	—	1953	1969	became Route 182
Route 57	21.10	33.96	US 22 in Lopatcong	Mountain Avenue (Route 182/CR 517) and Schooleys Mountain Road (CR 517) in Hackettstown	1969	current	
Route 58	1.48	2.38	Orange and Hecker streets in Newark	Harrison Avenue in Harrison	1953	1997	Removed by 1997
Route 59	0.15	0.24	South Avenue (CR 610) in Garwood	North Avenue (Route 28) in Cranford	1953	current	
Route 60	—	—	Verga	Bridgeboro	1953	—	became I-295
Route 60	58.4	94.0	US 40 in Pennsville	US 9 in Ocean City	1953	current	Still active, but unlikely to be built
Route 61	—	—	Bayonne Bridge	US 1/9 Truck in Jersey City	1953	—	preliminary number for part of Route 440
Route 62	0.47	0.76	US 46 in Totowa	I-80 in Totowa	1953	current	
Route 63	3.09	4.97	Kennedy Boulevard (CR 501) in North Bergen	US 1/9/US 46 in Fort Lee	1953	current	
Route 64	0.32	0.51	Princeton–Hightstown Road (CR 571) and Cranbury Road (CR 615) in West Windsor	Washington Road (CR 571) in West Windsor	1953	current	
Route 65	4.12	6.63	US 1/9 in Newark	Truck US 1/9 in Newark	1953	1963	Removed by 1963
Route 66	3.62	5.83	Route 33 in Tinton Falls	Route 35 on the Neptune/Ocean township line	1953	current	
Route 67	1.86	2.99	Palisade Avenue (Route 5) and Central Boulevard (Route 5) in Fort Lee	Fletcher Avenue (US 9W) and Lemoine Avenue (US 9W) in Fort Lee	1953	current	
Route 68	7.80	12.55	Pemberton–Wrightstown Road (CR 616) in New Hanover	US 206) in Mansfield Township	1953	current	
Route 69	48.36	77.83	North Broad Street (US 206) in Trenton	US 46 in White Township	1953	1967	Renumbered due to sign theft
Route 70	59.84	96.30	Route 38, Marlton Pike (CR 601), and Browning Road (CR 612) in Pennsauken	Route 34 and Route 35 in Wall Township	1953	current	
Route 71	16.78	27.00	Route 35 in Brielle	Main Street (Route 35) in Eatontown	1953	current	
Route 72	28.74	46.25	Route 70, Magnolia Road (CR 644), and Four Mile Road (CR 646) in Woodland Township	Long Beach Boulevard (CR 607) in Ship Bottom	1953	current	
Route 73	34.64	55.75	Black Horse Pike (US 322) in Folsom	PA 73 at the Pennsylvania state line in Palmyra	1953	current	
Route 74	—	—	Laurelton	Mantoloking	1953	1963	Never built
Route 74	10.6	17.1	Route 18 in East Brunswick	Route 35 in Old Bridge	1963	—	Not built
Route 75	—	—	US 1/9 in Newark	McCarter Highway (Route 21) in Newark	1961	1997	Never built
Route 76	1.18	1.90	New Jersey Turnpike (I-95) in Elizabeth	US 1/9 in Elizabeth	c. 1960	1964	Changed to Route 81 due to I-76
Route 76C	1.22	1.96	I-76 in Camden	Black Horse Pike (Route 168) in Camden	—	—	Still active
Route 77	22.55	36.29	East Broad Street (Route 49) in Bridgeton	Woodstown Road (Route 45) and South Main Street (Route 45) in Harrison Township	1953	current	
Route 78	—	—	Pennsylvania state line in Paulsboro	Black Horse Pike (Route 42) in Monroe Township	1953	—	unbuilt
Route 79	12.13	19.52	US 9 in Freehold Township	Route 34 in Matawan	1953	current	
Route 80	—	—	—	—	1953	—	unbuilt
Route 81	—	—	—	—	1953	—	unbuilt
Route 81	1.18	1.90	New Jersey Turnpike (I-95) in Elizabeth	US 1/9 in Elizabeth	1964	current	
Route 82	4.92	7.92	Springfield Avenue (Route 124) and Main Street (CR 577) in Springfield	North Avenue (Route 439) in Union	1953	current	
Route 83	3.81	6.13	Delsea Drive (Route 47) in Dennis Township	Shore Road (US 9) in Dennis Township	1953	current	
Route 84	7.03	11.31	Route 23 in Sussex	NY 84 in Wantage Township	1942	1966	
Route 85	—	—	—	—	1953	—	unbuilt except for Route 162
Route 85	7.6	12.2	I-78 in Jersey City	I-80 in Fort Lee	1965	—	unbuilt
Route 87	1.70	2.74	Absecon Boulevard (US 30) in Atlantic City	Brigantine Boulevard (CR 638) in Brigantine	1953	current	
Route 88	10.02	16.13	Madison Avenue (US 9/CR 547) in Lakewood	Cincinnati Avenue (Route 35) and Sea Avenue (Route 35) in Point Pleasant	1953	current	
Route 89	—	—	—	—	1953	—	unbuilt
Route 90	3.22	5.18	Betsy Ross Bridge at the Pennsylvania in Pennsauken	Route 73 in Cinnaminson	1953	current	
Route 91	2.26	3.64	US 1 and Orchard Street in North Brunswick	Jersey Avenue (CR 693) and Van Dyke Avenue in New Brunswick	1953	current	
Route 92	6.7	10.8	US 1 in South Brunswick	New Jersey Turnpike (I-95) in Monroe Township	c. 1950	2006	Never built
Route 93	3.50	5.63	Broad Avenue (US 1/9) in Ridgefield	Route 4, Grand Avenue (CR 501) Van Nostrand Avenue (CR 501) in Englewood	1953	current	
Route 94	45.94	73.93	Portland–Columbia Toll Bridge at the Pennsylvania state line in Knowlton Township	NY 94 at the New York state line in Vernon	1953	current	
Route 95W	11.03	17.75	I-95 / N.J. Turnpike Mainline in Newark	I-95 / N.J. Turnpike Mainline in Ridgefield Park	1950	current	Western Spur of the NJ Turnpike; as I-95 / NJ Turnpike; inventoried as a state route
Route 100	—	—	Route 26 in North Brunswick	George Washington Bridge in Fort Lee	1938	1953	
Route S100	—	—	Route 100 in Elizabeth	Route 25 in Elizabeth	1938	1953	
Route 101	—	—	Harrison Avenue in Kearny	Route 4 in Hackensack	1939	1953	
Route S101	—	—	Route 4 in Hackensack	New York state line in Montvale	1951	1953	
Route 109	3.06	4.92	Jackson Street (CR 633) in Cape May	Sandman Boulevard (US 9) in Lower Township	c. 1970	current	
Route 120	2.65	4.26	Route 3 in East Rutherford	Route 17 in East Rutherford	c. 1990	current	
Route 122	2.42	3.89	South Main Street (CR 678) and Pursel Street in Phillipsburg	US 22 in Pohatcong	1990	current	
Route 124	14.74	23.72	Park Place (US 202/CR 510) in Morristown	Springfield Avenue (CR 603) on the Maplewood/Irvington township line	1972	current	
Route 129	2.41	3.88	Lamberton Road in Hamilton	US 1 in Trenton	1993	current	
Route 133	4.06	6.53	Princeton–Hightstown Road (CR 571) and Windsor Center Drive in East Windsor	New Jersey Turnpike (I-95) in East Windsor	1999	current	
Route 138	3.52	5.66	I-195 and Route 34 in Wall Township	Route 35 in Wall Township	1988	current	Extension of I-195
Route 139	2.77	4.46	Tonnele Avenue (US 1/9) in Jersey City	I-78 in Jersey City	1953	current	139U (signed as 139) is upper level 139 is lower level
Route 139U	0.83	1.34	Kennedy Boulevard (CR 501) in Jersey City	Route 139 in Jersey City	1953	current	Signed as part of 139; 139U is upper level; 139 is lower level
Route 140	0.96	1.54	Shell Road (US 130) in Carneys Point	New Jersey Turnpike and Wiley Road (US 40) in Carneys Point	1977	current	
Route 143	2.35	3.78	South Egg Harbor Road (CR 561) and Hay Road (CR 726) in Winslow Township	Old White Horse Pike (CR 716) in Winslow Township	1989	current	
Route 147	4.20	6.76	US 9 in Middle Township	New Jersey Avenue (CR 621) and New York Avenue in North Wildwood	1971	current	
Route 151	0.56	0.90	I-676 in Camden	Federal Street (CR 537) in Camden	1946	1969	Removed by 1969
Route 152	—	—	Memorial Drive in Trenton	US 206 in Trenton	1953	1969	Became part of Route 29 by 1969
Route 152	3.16	5.09	Maryland Avenue (CR 620) and Bay Avenue in Somers Point	Ventnor Avenue (CR 629) in Egg Harbor Township	1969	current	
Route 153	1.43	2.30	Route 3 in Secaucus	Route 3 in Secaucus	1953	1980	Removed by 1980
Route 154	1.70	2.74	Haddonfield–Berlin Road (CR 561) in Cherry Hill	Kings Highway (Route 41) in Cherry Hill	1953	current	
Route 155	1.96	3.15	Ferry docks in Palmyra	US 130 in Cinnaminson	1953	c. 1980	
Route 156	1.18	1.90	US 130 in Hamilton	US 130 in Hamilton	1953	current	
Route 157	0.91	1.46	White Horse Pike (US 30) in Absecon	Wyoming Avenue (US 9) in Absecon	1953	current	
Route 158	0.40	0.64	Centre Street (CR 508) and Park Place in Newark	2nd Street in Harrison	1953	c. 1966	Bridge was removed from service by 1966; bridge was dismantled in 1979
Route 159	1.36	2.19	US 46 in Montville	US 46 in Fairfield	1953	current	
Route 160	0.47	0.76	US 206 in Bordentown Township	US 206 in Bordentown Township	1953	1980	Removed in 1980
Route 161	1.10	1.77	Allwood Road (CR 602) in Clifton	Clifton Avenue (CR 611) and Van Houten Avenue (CR 614) in Clifton	1953	current	
Route 162	0.70	1.13	Seashore Road (CR 626) and New England Road (CR 641) in Lower Township	Seashore Road (CR 603/CR 626) in Lower Township	1969	current	
Route 163	0.30	0.48	US 46 in Knowlton Township	Dead end in Knowlton Township	1953	current	
Route 164	1.05	1.69	York Avenue in Elizabeth	North Avenue in Elizabeth	1953	1955	Given to the city of Elizabeth once construction was completed in 1955
Route 165	0.26	0.42	Route 29 in Lambertville	Bridge Street (Route 179) in Lambertville	1953	current	
Route 166	3.75	6.04	Atlantic City Boulevard (US 9) in Beachwood	Lakewood Road (US 9) and the Garden State Parkway in Toms River	1954	current	
Route 167	0.77	1.24	New York Road (US 9) in Port Republic	US 9 in Bass River	1954	current	Two separate segments
Route 168	10.75	17.30	Black Horse Pike (Route 42) in Washington Township	Mt Ephraim Avenue (CR 605) and Ferry Avenue (CR 603) on the Camden/Woodlynne border	1959	current	
Route 169	5.73	9.22	NY 440 at the New York state line in Bayonne	New Jersey Turnpike Newark Bay Extension (I-78) in Bayonne	1957	2001	
Route 170	0.89	1.43	US 206 in Mansfield Township	US 206 in Mansfield Township	1957	1986	
Route 171	0.98	1.58	US 1 and US 130 in North Brunswick	Georges Road in New Brunswick	1953	current	
Route 172	0.69	1.11	George Street (CR 527) and Paul Robeson Boulevard in New Brunswick	Route 18 in New Brunswick	1955	current	
Route 173	14.62	23.53	I-78 and US 22 in Greenwich Township	Beaver Avenue (CR 626) in Clinton Township	1969	current	
Route 174	0.81	1.30	US 1 in Trenton	Whitehead Road (CR 616) in Lawrence Township	c. 1957	1988	
Route 175	2.95	4.75	Route 29 in Trenton	Route 29 in Ewing	1963	current	
Route 177	0.24	0.39	US 206 in Somerville	5th Street in Somerville	1961	1974	Removed by 1974
Route 178	—	—	Route 24 in Morristown	I-80 in Denville	1967	1997	Never built
Route 179	7.46	12.01	PA 179 at the Pennsylvania state line in Lambertville	US 202/Route 31 and Old York Road (CR 514) in East Amwell	1965	current	
Route 180	3.12	5.02	US 9 in Stafford Township	Selma Drive in Stafford Township	1967	1980	
Route 181	7.47	12.02	Route 15 in Jefferson Township	Route 15 in Sparta	1974	current	
Route 182	0.96	1.54	Route 57 and Schooleys Mountain Road (CR 517) in Hackettstown	Main Street (US 46) in Hackettstown	1969	current	
Route 183	2.12	3.41	I-80 and US 206 in Roxbury	US 206 in Stanhope	1973	current	
Route 184	1.37	2.20	King Georges Post Road (CR 501) in Woodbridge	Convery Boulevard Route 35) in Perth Amboy	1974	current	
Route 185	0.65	1.05	Route 440 in Jersey City	Linden Avenue in Jersey City	1988	current	
Route 187	0.40	0.64	Atlantic City–Brigantine Connector in Atlantic City	Huron Avenue (Route 87) in Atlantic City	—	—	Still active
Route 200	—	—	—	—	—	1953	
Route 201	—	—	—	—	—	1953	
Route 203	—	—	—	—	—	1953	
Route 208	10.07	16.21	Route 4 in Fair Lawn	I-287 in Oakland	1974	current	
Route 284	7.03	11.31	Main Street Route 23) in Sussex	NY 284 at the New York state line in Wantage Township	1966	current	
Route 300	—	—	Delaware Memorial Bridge in Pennsville	Route 100 near New Brunswick	1938	1953	
Route 303	—	—	Route 4 in Tenafly	NY 303 at the New York state line in Northvale	1953	1963	Never built
Route 324	1.51	2.43	Delaware River shoreline in Logan Township	Cul-de-sac in Logan Township	1974	current	
Route 347	8.33	13.41	Delsea Drive (Route 47) in Dennis Township	Delsea Drive (Route 47) in Maurice River	1990	current	
Route 413	0.76	1.22	PA 413 at the Pennsylvania state line Burlington	US 130/CR 543 in Burlington	1953	current	
Route 439	3.95	6.36	I-278 in Elizabeth	Newark Avenue (Route 27) in Elizabeth	1953	current	
Route 440	13.33	21.45	New Jersey Turnpike (I-95) and I-287 in Edison; NY 440 at the New York state line in Bayonne	NY 440 at the New York state line in Perth Amboy; Truck US 1/9 and Communipaw Avenue (CR 612) in Jersey City	1953	current	Two separate segments
Route 444	172.40	277.45	Route 109 in Lower Township	Garden State Parkway Connector at the New York state line in Montvale	1947	current	Garden State Parkway
Route 444R	—	—	Garden State Parkway in Hazlet	Route 35 and Route 36 in Keyport	1953	2006	Exit 117 on the Garden State Parkway (Route 444)
Route 444S	0.50	0.80	Garden State Parkway in Tinton Falls	Route 36 on the Eatontown/Tinton Falls border	—	—	Exit 105 on the Garden State Parkway (Route 444), Still active
Route 445	11.06	17.80	I-95/US 1/9 in Fort Lee	Palisades Parkway at New York state line in Alpine	1958	current	Palisades Interstate Parkway
Route 445S	0.42	0.68	Route 67 in Fort Lee	Palisades Parkway in Fort Lee	—	—	Still active
Route 446	44.19	71.12	Route 42 in Washington Township	Fairmount Avenue, Baltic Avenue, and Christopher Columbus Boulevard in Atlantic City	1964	current	Atlantic City Expressway
Route 446X	2.37	3.81	Atlantic City Expressway in Atlantic City	Brigantine Boulevard (Route 87) in Atlantic City	2001	current	Atlantic City–Brigantine Connector
Route 495	3.45	5.55	New Jersey Turnpike (I-95) in Secaucus	NY 495 at the New York state line in Weehawken	1959	current	Originated as I-495
Route 700	51.99	83.67	I-295/US 40 in Pennsville	I-95 in Mansfield Township	1951	current	New Jersey Turnpike, 51.0-mile (82.1 km) portion south of exit 6 is unsigned Route 700 while remainder is I-95
Route 700N	5.90	9.50	New Jersey Turnpike (I-95) in Newark	Exit 14C on the New Jersey Turnpike Newark Bay Extension in Jersey City	1953	1969	New Jersey Turnpike Newark Bay Extension, now I-78
Route 700P	6.50	10.46	Pennsylvania Turnpike (I-276) at the Pennsylvania state line in Burlington Township	New Jersey Turnpike (I-95) in Mansfield Township	1953	1969	New Jersey Turnpike Pennsylvania Turnpike Extension, now I-95
Route 24-28 Link	2.29	3.69	Route 24 in Phillipsburg	Route 28 in Phillipsburg	1940	1953	
Route 27-28 Link	0.52	0.84	Route 28 in Elizabeth	Route 27 in Elizabeth	1927	1953	
Route 28-29 Link	2.29	3.69	Route 28 in Somerville	Route 29 / Route 31 in Somerville	1938	1953	
Route 33-35 Link	3.62	5.83	Route 33 in Tinton Falls	Route 35 in Neptune	—	1953	Now NJ 66
Former

== See also ==
- County routes in New Jersey
