= S101 =

S101 may refer to:

- Asus Eee PC S101, a netbook computer from Asus
- Dome S101, a sports car prototype for endurance racing
- Highway S101, proposed northern extension of New Jersey Route 101, never built
- HMS Dreadnought (S101), the United Kingdom's first nuclear-powered submarine
- New Jersey State Highway S101, a controlled-access toll road running north–south in eastern New Jersey
- SAS Manthatisi (S101), a Heroine-class submarine in service with the South African Navy
- Soviet submarine S-101, Stalinets-class submarine of the Soviet Navy
