= New Jersey Route 5 =

State highway in Bergen County, New Jersey, US

Route 5

Route information
- Maintained by NJDOT
- Length: 3.18 mi (5.12 km)
- Existed: 1927 (1916 as Route 10)–present

Major junctions
- West end: US 1-9 in Ridgefield
- Route 63 / CR 501 in Palisades Park; Route 67 in Fort Lee
- East end: CR 505 in Edgewater

Location
- Country: United States
- State: New Jersey
- Counties: Bergen

Highway system
- New Jersey State Highway Routes; Interstate; US; State; Scenic Byways
← Route 4	→ Route 6

Route 5 is a 3.18-mile (5.12 km) state highway located entirely in Bergen County, New Jersey, United States. It runs from U.S. Route 1/9 (US 1-9) in Ridgefield east down the New Jersey Palisades to end at County Route 505 (CR 505, River Road) at the Hudson River in Edgewater, forming a “wavy” path. The route is a two- to four-lane undivided highway its entire length, passing mostly through wooded residential neighborhoods. The route passes under Route 63 in Palisades Park, with access to that route provided by Bergen Boulevard, and intersects the southern terminus of Route 67 in Fort Lee.

The route was designated in 1916 as part of pre-1927 Route 10, which was to run from Paterson east to the terminal of the Fort Lee Ferry in Edgewater, using the Paterson and Hackensack Turnpike between Paterson and Hackensack, the Bergen Turnpike from Hackensack to Ridgefield, and a new alignment between Ridgefield and Edgewater. In 1927, the route was renumbered to Route 5, with initial plans to build a new alignment for the route between Ridgefield and Little Ferry. Route 5 was also planned to run concurrent with Route 6 (now US 46) between Paterson and Ridgefield. However, the plans were modified in 1929 to build Route 6 on a new alignment and have Route 5 end at Route 1 (now US 1/9) in Ridgefield. The former alignment was designated as Route 10N with maintenance eventually turned over to the county. The eastern terminus of Route 5 was moved to its current location by the 2000s. In 2007, construction began to improve the route in Palisades Park by replacing bridges and widening the road, with work completed in late 2009.

== Route description ==
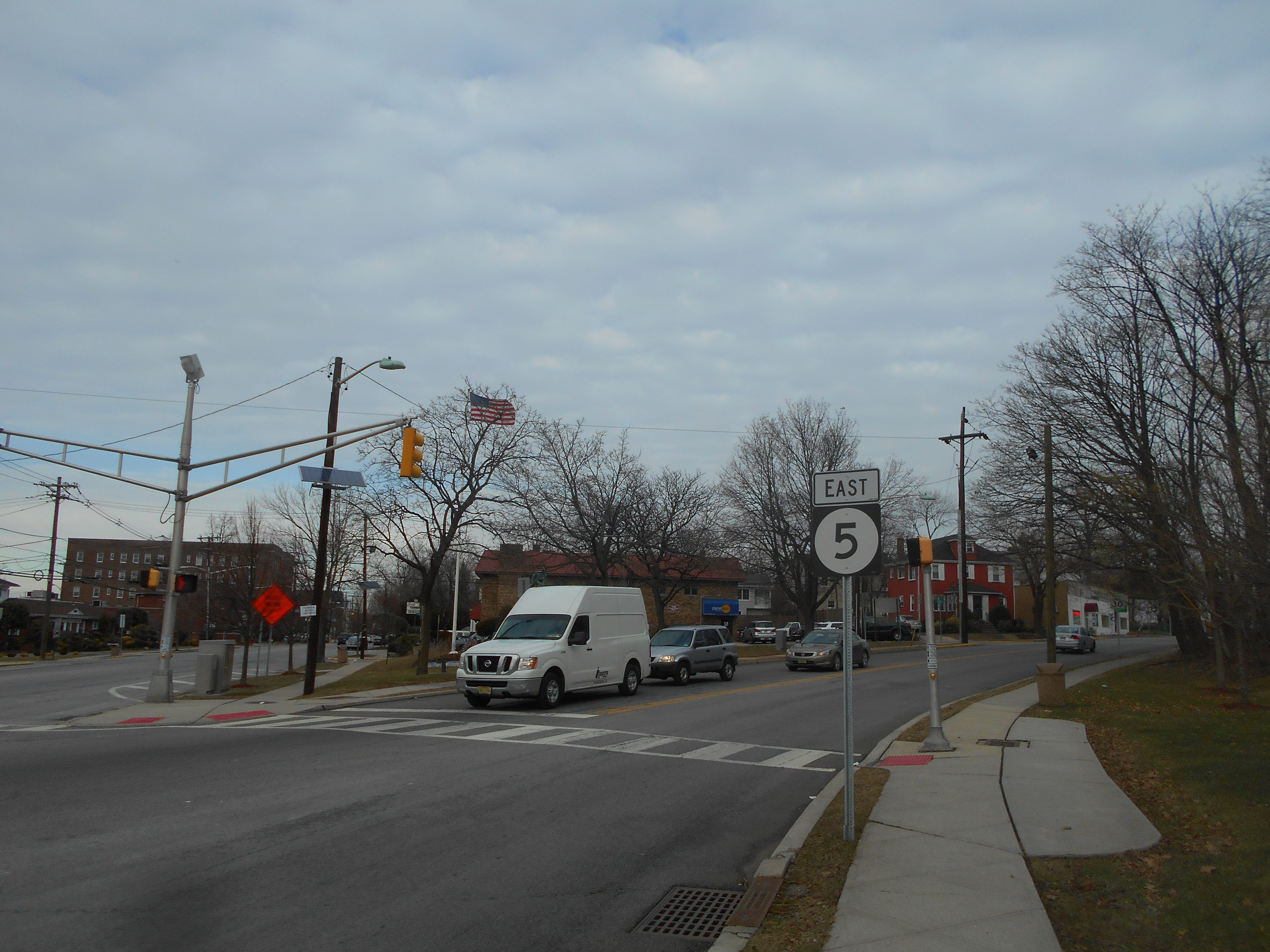
Route 5 east at the intersersection with US Route 1/9 in Ridgefield

Route 5 begins at an intersection with US 1-9 (North Broad Avenue) in Ridgefield, heading east as a two-lane undivided road through residential areas. It crosses CR 31 (Maple Avenue) and enters Palisades Park. In Palisades Park, the road passes over Delia Avenue and turns south as it heads through wooded residential neighborhoods. Route 5 passes under Route 63 and enters Fort Lee, where the route immediately intersects Bergen Boulevard, which provides access to Route 63. From there, the road heads east through wooded neighborhoods before turning north onto Glen Road.

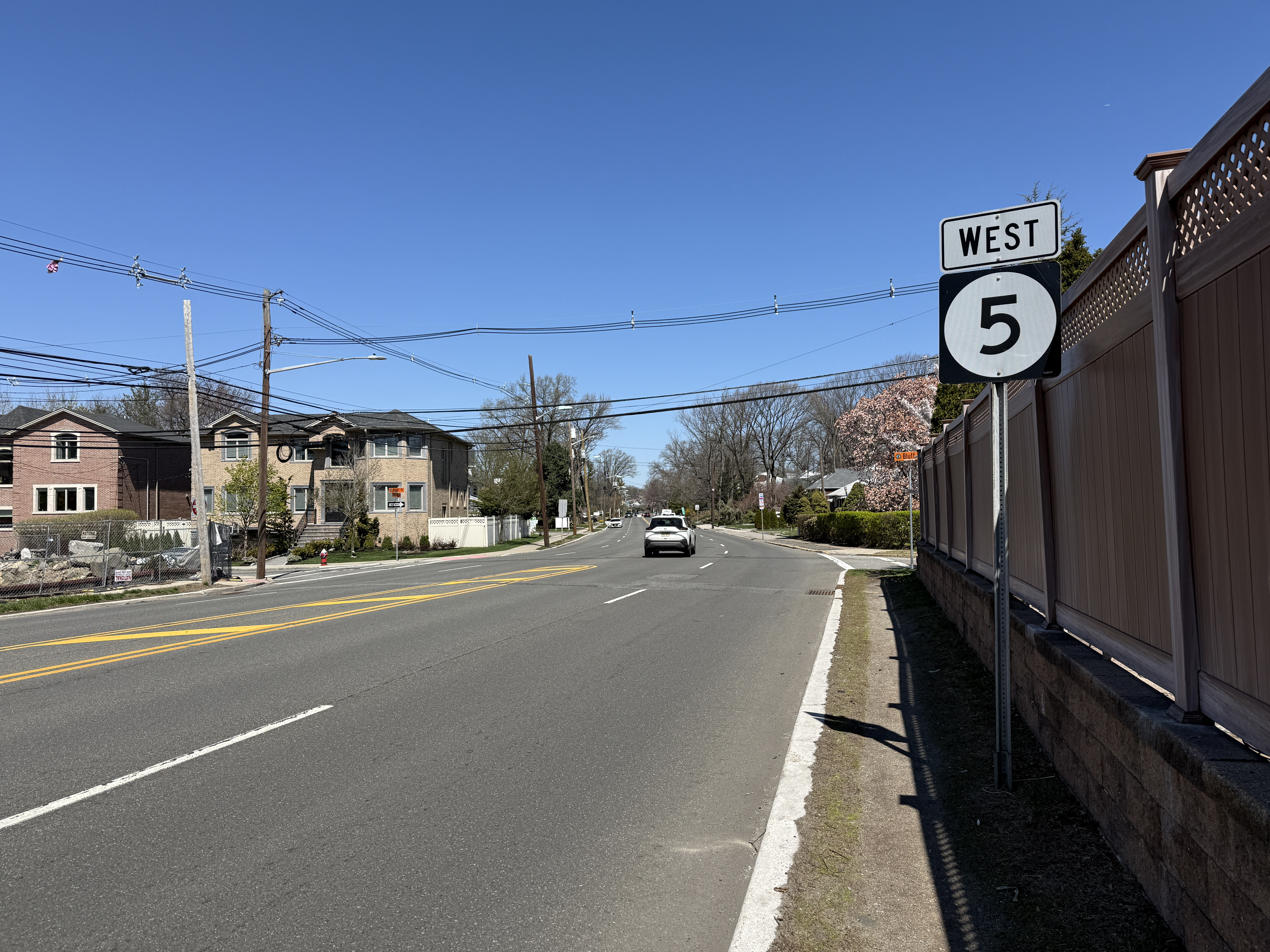
View west along Route 5 (Palisade Avenue) at Bluff Road in Fort Lee

Route 5 comes to an intersection with County Route 29 (Anderson Avenue) and County Route 54 (Central Boulevard), where the route continues east on Central Boulevard as a four-lane undivided road through inhabited areas. It meets the southern terminus of Route 67 (Palisade Avenue) and continues south along that road. After 0.36 mi (0.58 km) of following Palisade Avenue, Route 5 makes a left turn onto a two-lane road, with County Route 27 continuing south on Palisade Avenue. The route descends the New Jersey Palisades on a winding road with hairpin turns, crossing into Edgewater. In Edgewater, the road briefly heads through commercial areas before ending at CR 505 (River Road) along the Hudson River.

== History ==
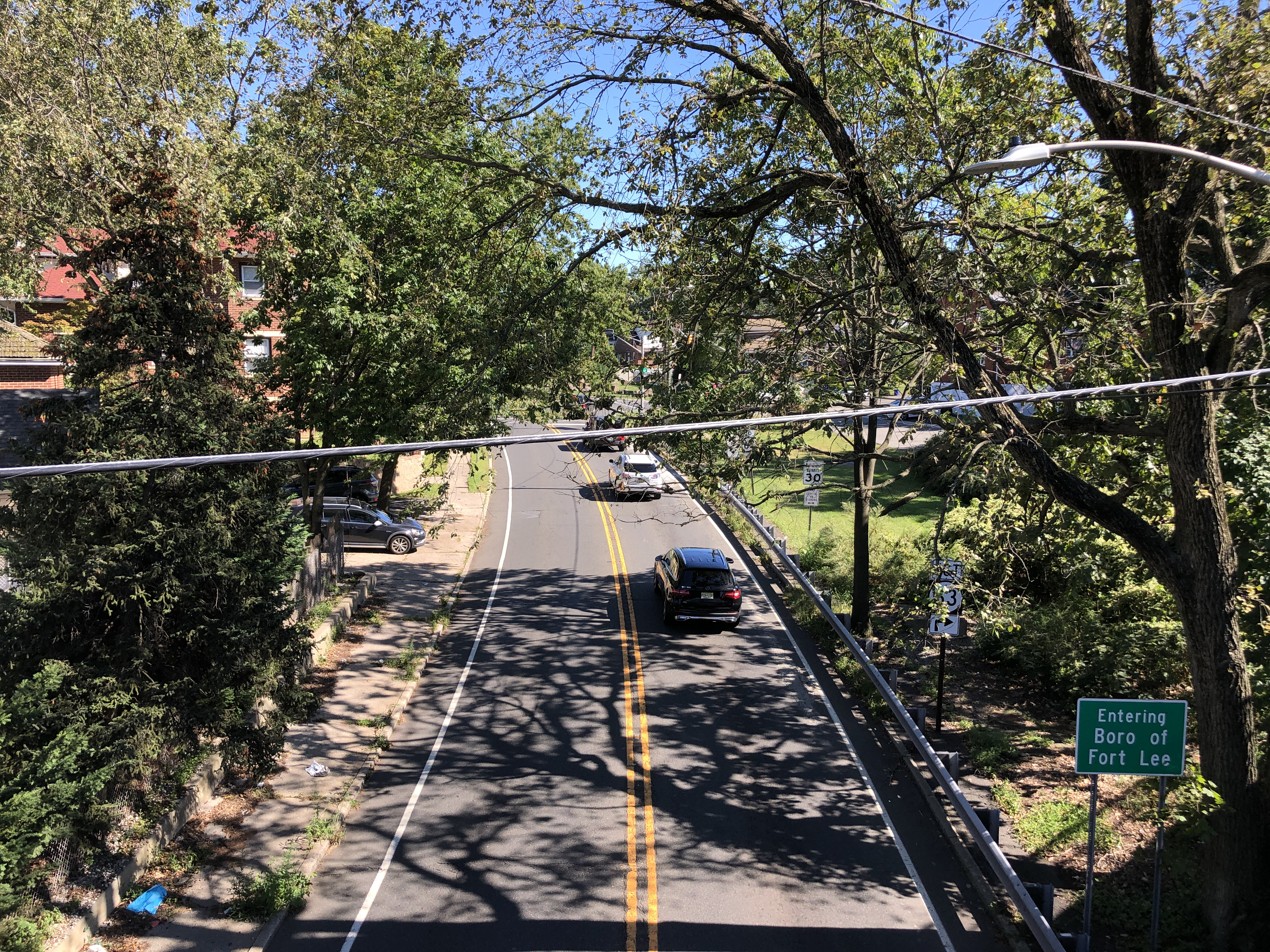
Route 5 eastbound past Route 63 in Fort Lee

Pre-1927 Route 10 was legislated in 1916 to run from Paterson east by way of Hackensack and Ridgefield to the Public Service Railway's Fort Lee Ferry at Edgewater. From Paterson it used the existing Paterson and Hackensack Turnpike (Market Street and Essex Street, legislated in 1815) to Hackensack and the Bergen Turnpike (Hudson Street) to Ridgefield. Rather than use existing roads from Ridgefield down the Palisades to Edgewater, a whole new route was surveyed with better grades. This road was built by 1922. At its east end, Route 10 ran south several blocks on River Road to the ferry, just south of Dempsey Avenue. In Ridgefield, Broad Avenue was used to get between the new alignment and Bergen Turnpike.

In the 1927 New Jersey state highway renumbering, Route 10 was renumbered to Route 5. Plans at the time were to build a new alignment from east of Ridgefield to Little Ferry southeast of Hackensack and form Route S5 (now locally maintained) along the old road from Little Ferry to Ridgefield. The new Route 6 would share the alignment of Route 5 from Paterson to west of Hackensack, where it would turn southeast onto a new alignment to Little Ferry, then run with Route 5 again to east of Ridgefield and split onto its own alignment to the George Washington Bridge.

Route 10N

In 1929, the routes were redefined. Route 6 would be a completely new alignment from Paterson to the George Washington Bridge, and Route 5 would only run east from Route 1 (Broad Avenue, now US 1/9) in Ridgefield. The alignment of Route 10 west of Ridgefield was designated Route 10N until it was eventually turned over to the county. Route 5 retained its routing in the 1953 New Jersey state highway renumbering. By the 2000s, the section of Route 5 along River Road to the former ferry was removed. In June 2007, construction began on a $24.6 million project to improve the route through Palisades Park. This project, which was completed in late 2009, involved the replacement of the bridge over Delia Boulevard, the removal of a bridge over an abandoned rail line, and the widening of the two-lane road to include a shoulder.

== Major intersections ==
The entire route is in Bergen County.

Location	mi	km	Destinations	Notes
Ridgefield	0.00	0.00	US 1-9 (Broad Avenue) – Jersey City, Newark, Hackensack	Western terminus
Fort Lee	0.92	1.48	Route 63 (CR 501)	Access via Bergen Boulevard
Fort Lee	1.81	2.91	Route 67 north (Palisade Avenue) – Fort Lee, George Washington Bridge	Southern terminus of Route 67
Edgewater	3.18	5.12	CR 505 (River Road)	Eastern terminus
1.000 mi = 1.609 km; 1.000 km = 0.621 mi
