= New Jersey Route 1 =

Former state highway in New Jersey, United States

Route 1 was a state highway in the U.S. state of New Jersey prior to the 1953 renumbering. Created in the 1927 renumbering, it was designated to run from Rockleigh to Bayonne, along the Hudson River. That same year, Route S1 was created as a spur along Bergen Boulevard, now signed Route 63. The Route 1 designation was placed on a new route north of Fort Lee in 1929, replacing the existing Route 18N; the old section of Route 1 still survives as County Route 501, and Route S1A, now Route 67, was created from the remnants of Route 18N not taken over by the realignment of Route 1. By the 1953 renumbering, the entirety of the route was occupied by various U.S. Routes, and the New Jersey Route 1 designation was abandoned. Its sections are now parts of U.S. Route 9W, U.S. Route 1/9, U.S. Route 1/9 Truck, and Route 440.

== See also ==
- State highways in New Jersey

Browse numbered routes
← US 1	NJ	→ Route 2
