= Palisades Park Public School District =

School district in Bergen County, New Jersey, US

Address
- 270 First Street Palisades Park, Bergen County, New Jersey, 07650; United States
- Coordinates: 40.847295°N 73.9971°W

District information
- Grades: PreK-12
- Superintendent: Carl Albano
- Business administrator: Vacant
- Schools: 3

Students and staff
- Enrollment: 1,786 (as of 2022–23)
- Faculty: 145.9 FTEs
- Student–teacher ratio: 12.2:1

Other information
- District Factor Group: CD
- Website: www.palpkschools.org
Ind.	Per pupil	District spending	Rank (*)	K-12 average	%± vs. average
1A	Total Spending	$16,535	9	$18,891	−12.5%
1	Budgetary Cost	12,163	8	14,783	−17.7%
2	Classroom Instruction	8,247	25	8,763	−5.9%
6	Support Services	926	1	2,392	−61.3%
8	Administrative Cost	1,427	8	1,485	−3.9%
10	Operations & Maintenance	1,186	4	1,783	−33.5%
13	Extracurricular Activities	313	7	268	16.8%
16	Median Teacher Salary	49,507	2	64,043
Data from NJDoE 2014 Taxpayers' Guide to Education Spending. *Of K-12 districts with up to 1,800 students. Lowest spending=1; Highest=49

The Palisades Park Public School District is a comprehensive community public school district that serves students in pre-kindergarten through twelfth grade from Palisades Park, in Bergen County, in the U.S. state of New Jersey.

As of the 2022–23 school year, the district, comprising three schools, had an enrollment of 1,786 students and 145.9 classroom teachers (on an FTE basis), for a student–teacher ratio of 12.2:1.

The district had been classified by the New Jersey Department of Education as being in District Factor Group "CD", the sixth-highest of eight groupings. District Factor Groups organize districts statewide to allow comparison by common socioeconomic characteristics of the local districts. From lowest socioeconomic status to highest, the categories are A, B, CD, DE, FG, GH, I and J.

== Schools ==
Schools in the district (with 2022–23 enrollment data from the National Center for Education Statistics) are:

- Charles R. Smith Early Childhood Center with 242 students in grades PreK-K
  - Jillian Romero, principal
- Lindbergh Elementary School with 769 students in grades 1-6
  - Patrick Phalon, principal
- Palisades Park High School with 745 students in grades 7-12
  - Nicholas Cipriano, principal

== Administration ==
Core members of the district's administration include:

- Carl Albano, superintendent of schools
- Vacant, business administrator and board secretary

== Board of education ==
The district's board of education, comprised of nine members, sets policy and oversees the fiscal and educational operation of the district through its administration. As a Type II school district, the board's trustees are elected directly by voters to serve three-year terms of office on a staggered basis, with three seats up for election each year held (since 2017) as part of the November general election. The board appoints a superintendent to oversee the district's day-to-day operations and a business administrator to supervise the business functions of the district.
