= New Jersey Route 101 =

Proposed state highway in New Jersey, US

Route 101

Route information
- Maintained by New Jersey State Highway Department
- Existed: 1939–by 1953

Major junctions
- South end: Harrison Avenue in Kearny
- North end: Route 4 in Hackensack

Location
- Country: United States
- State: New Jersey
- Counties: Hudson, Bergen

Highway system
- New Jersey State Highway Routes; Interstate; US; State; Scenic Byways
| ← Route 100 | → Route 109 |

Route 101 was a proposed state highway in the U.S. state of New Jersey. It was planned in 1939 as a freeway from Kearny to Hackensack, but it was never built. Route S101 was a northern extension of Route 101 planned at the same time from Hackensack through Paramus to the New York state line at Montvale. The section from Hackensack to Paramus was never built; the section from Paramus to the state line was built as part of the Garden State Parkway (Route 444) instead. Both designations were repealed in the 1953 renumbering.

== Route description ==
Route 101 was planned to begin at Harrison Avenue in Kearny, Hudson County. From here, the route was to head north into the New Jersey Meadowlands in Bergen County, where it would pass through Lyndhurst, Rutherford, and East Rutherford. Route 101 would continue north through Carlstadt before running in between Moonachie Road and the Hackensack River. The route was to pass through Little Ferry and into the eastern part of Hackensack, where Route 101 was to terminate at an intersection with Route 4. From this point, Route S101 was planned to continue north to the border in Montvale.

== History ==
Route 101 was first legislated in 1939 to connect Kearny and Hackensack. In 1951, a northward extension of the route, Route S101, was legislated to continue from Hackensack to the New York border in Montvale. As neither of these roads had been built, the designations were repealed in the 1953 New Jersey state highway renumbering.

== Major intersections ==
| County | Location | mi | km | Destinations | Notes |
|---|---|---|---|---|---|
| Hudson | Kearny | | | Harrison Avenue | |
| Bergen | Hackensack | | | Route 4 | |
1.000 mi = 1.609 km; 1.000 km = 0.621 mi
