= County Route 505 (New Jersey) =

County highway in New Jersey, U.S.

County Route 505
- CR 505 highlighted in red

Route information
- Length: 20.64 mi (33.22 km)
- Existed: 1952–present

Major junctions
- South end: CR 501 in Union City
- Route 5 in Edgewater; I-95 / US 1-9 / US 46 / Route 67 in Fort Lee; Palisades Parkway in Englewood Cliffs; US 9W in Englewood Cliffs; CR 501 in Englewood; CR 502 in Closter
- North end: NY 303 at the New York state line

Location
- Country: United States
- State: New Jersey
- Counties: Hudson, Bergen

Highway system
- County routes in New Jersey; 500-series routes
← CR 504	→ CR 506

County Route 505 (CR 505) is a county highway in the U.S. state of New Jersey. The highway extends 20.64 miles (33.22 kilometers) from Kennedy Boulevard (CR 501) in Union City to the New York state line in Northvale.

== Route description ==
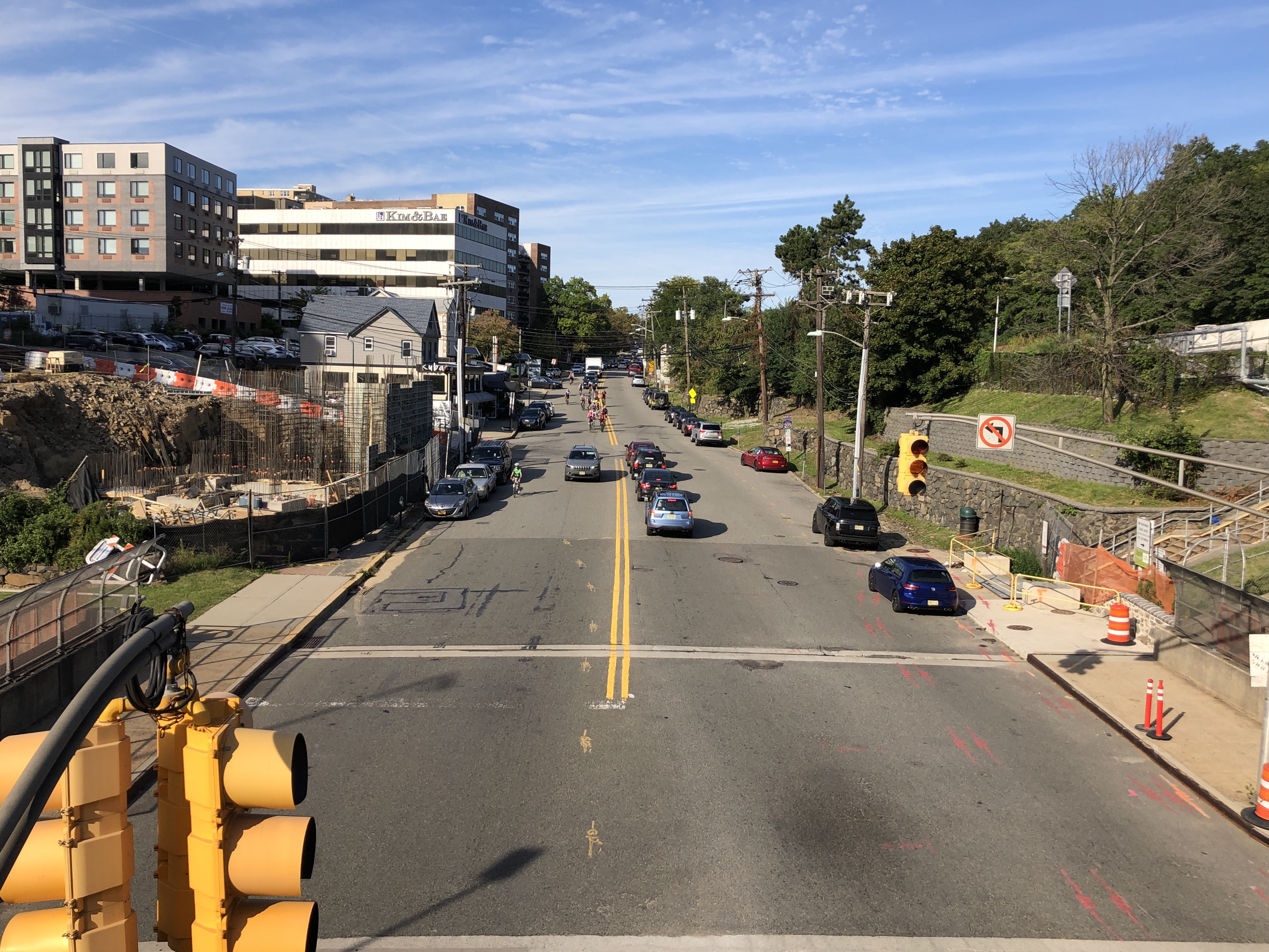
View northbound along CR 505 from I-95/US 1/US 9/US 46 in Fort Lee

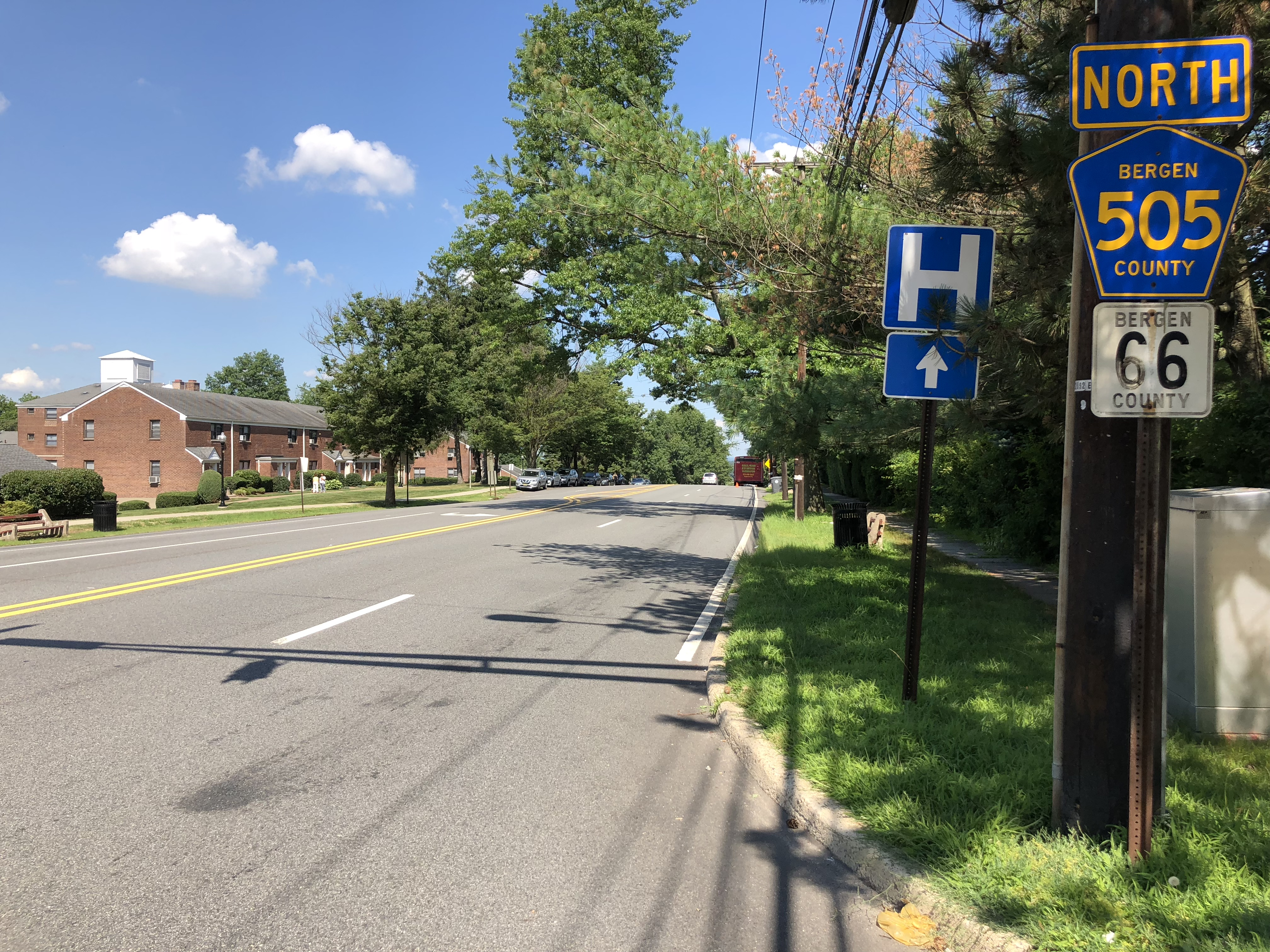
View north along CR 505 at Jones Road and Brayton Street in Englewood. Note the old-style CR 66 shield accompanying the modern CR 505 shield

County Route 505 begins at County Route 501 in Union City, where it travels east and soon after entering Weehawken, it is named Boulevard East. It proceeds northward, traveling parallel to the Hudson River atop the Hudson Palisades. At Anthony M. DeFino Way in West New York it takes a right turn and descends to the waterfront becoming River Road through North Bergen and Edgewater, where it then intersects Route 5. In Fort Lee it intersects with Interstate 95. CR 505 then intersects the Palisades Interstate Parkway, before traveling parallel to it. It then intersects County Route 501, before turning due north from the westward path it had previously followed along. It travels by Morrow Park, shortly before traveling near the Knickerbocker Country Club. It then intersects County Route 70, before continuing north and intersecting County Route 502. From there, it proceeds north, reaching its end at the New York/New Jersey border.

== History ==
Part of CR 505 was originally intended to New Jersey Route 303.

The 1955 USGS map of the Park Ridge Quadrangle shows CR 505 running south from the New York state line on Spring Valley Road in Montvale, then east on Grand Avenue, and south on Pascack Road through Park Ridge, Woodcliff Lake, and Hillsdale, all several miles west of its modern-day alignment.

Bike lanes on River Road were completed on July 24, 2012, in connection with a road re-paving project. They run a half mile from Palisades Medical Center in North Bergen and stretch southward towards Bulls Ferry Road in Weehawken.

There are numerous bridges along Boulevard East crossing over clefts in the cliffs, many approaching 100 years in age. A portion of the road was closed for six months in 2013 to replace one located in North Bergen.

== Major intersections ==
County	Location	mi	km	Destinations	Notes
Hudson	Union City	0.00	0.00	CR 501 (Kennedy Boulevard)	Southern terminus
Bergen	Edgewater	5.70	9.17	Route 5 west	Eastern terminus of Route 5
Bergen	Fort Lee	7.52	12.10	I-95 north (George Washington Bridge Upper Level) / Route 67 (Lemoine Avenue)	Exit 73 on I-95
Bergen	Englewood Cliffs	9.50	15.29	Palisades Parkway	Exit 1 on Palisades Parkway
Bergen	Englewood Cliffs	9.62	15.48	US 9W / CR 505 Truck north (Sylvan Avenue) – Fort Lee, Nyack, Bear Mountain, George Washington Bridge	Southern terminus of CR 505 Truck
Bergen	Englewood	11.04	17.77	CR 501 (Engle Street) / CR 505 Truck south (Dean Street) to Route 4 – Tenafly, Cresskill, Leonia, Palisades Park	Northern terminus of CR 505 Truck
Bergen	Closter	17.07	27.47	CR 502 (High Street) – Westwood, Alpine	
Bergen	Northvale	20.64	33.22	NY 303 north	Continuation into New York
1.000 mi = 1.609 km; 1.000 km = 0.621 mi

== CR 505 Truck ==
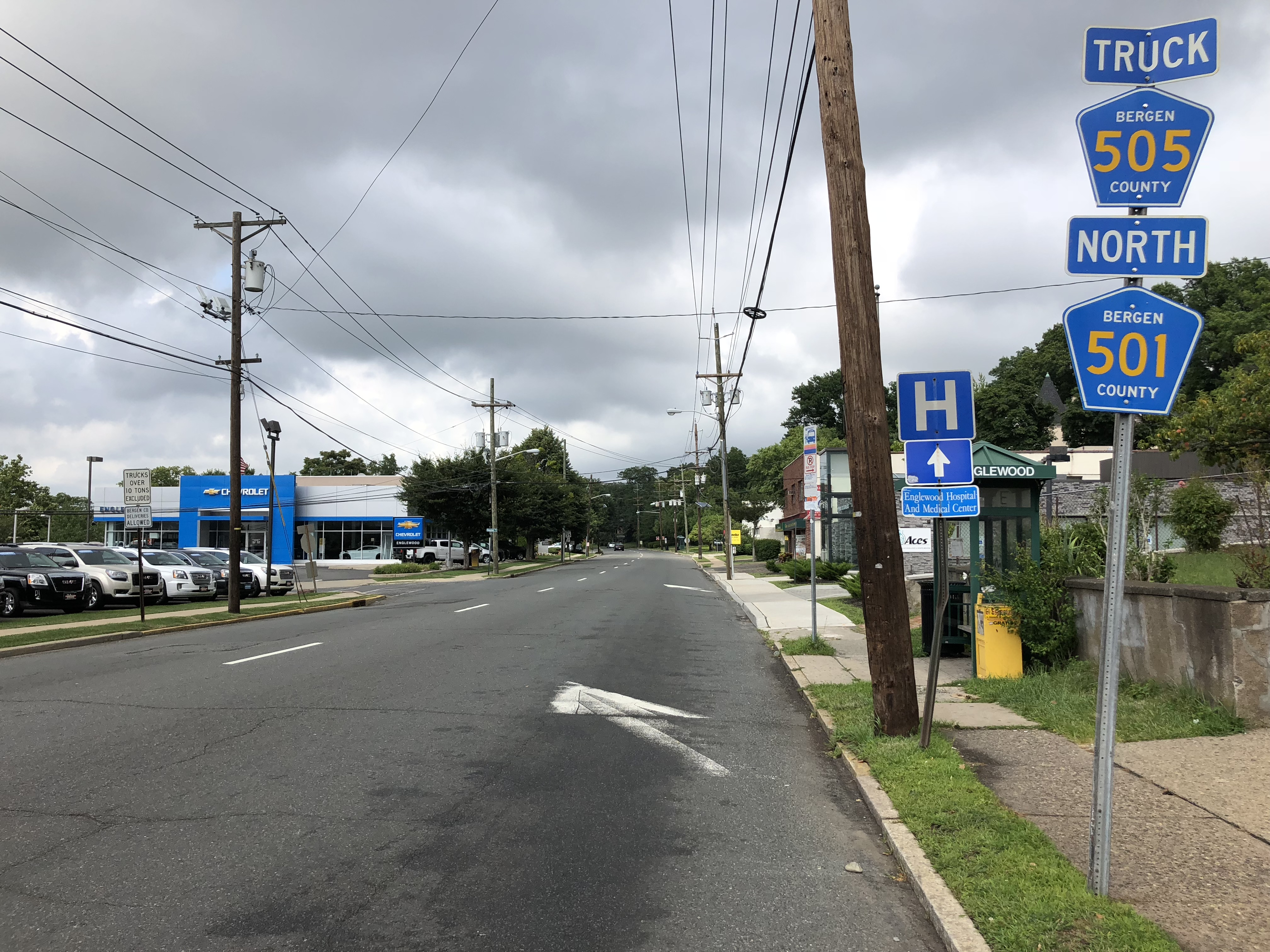
View north along CR 505 Truck and CR 501 in Englewood

County Route 505 Truck
- Location: Englewood Cliffs–Englewood
- Length: 4.65 mi (7.48 km)

County Route 505 Truck is a truck route bypassing the steep portion of CR 505 between US 9W in Englewood Cliffs and CR 501 in Englewood. The route follows US 9W south to Fort Lee before heading west along Route 4 to Englewood, where it heads north on CR 501.

Major intersections
The entire route is in Bergen County.

Location	mi	km	Destinations	Notes
Englewood Cliffs	0.00	0.00	US 9W north / CR 505 (Palisade Avenue) to Palisades Parkway – Englewood, Nyack, Bear Mountain	Southern terminus; southern end of US 9W concurrency
Fort Lee	1.54	2.48	Route 67 south	Interchange; northbound exit and southbound entrance; northern terminus of Route 67
Fort Lee	1.54	2.48	Palisades Parkway north	Interchange; southbound exit and northbound entrance; access via Route 445S
Fort Lee	2.02	3.25	US 9W ends, Route 4 begins	
Fort Lee	2.02	3.25	I-95 / N.J. Turnpike south / US 1-9 / US 46 to I-80 west – George Washington Bridge	Interchange; northern terminus of N.J. Turnpike; exits 72-74 on I-95
Englewood	3.23	5.20	Jones Road	Interchange
Englewood	3.81	6.13	Route 4 west / Route 93 south / CR 501 south (Grand Avenue) – Leonia, Paterson	Interchange; northern end of Route 4 concurrency; southern end of CR 501 concurrency
Englewood	4.65	7.48	CR 501 north (Engle Street) / CR 505 (Palisade Avenue) – Tenafly, Cresskill, Teaneck, Bergenfield	Northern terminus; northern end of CR 501 concurrency
1.000 mi = 1.609 km; 1.000 km = 0.621 mi: Concurrency terminus; Incomplete access; Route transition
