= New Jersey Route 67 =

State highway in Bergen County, New Jersey, US

Route 67

Route information
- Maintained by the NJDOT
- Length: 1.86 mi (2.99 km)
- Existed: January 1, 1953–present

Major junctions
- South end: Route 5 in Fort Lee
- I-95 / US 1-9 / US 46 / CR 505 in Fort Lee
- North end: US 9W / Palisades Parkway in Fort Lee

Location
- Country: United States
- State: New Jersey
- Counties: Bergen

Highway system
- New Jersey State Highway Routes; Interstate; US; State; Scenic Byways
← Route 66	→ Route 68

Route 67 is a short state highway entirely within the community of Fort Lee in Bergen County, New Jersey. It is part of the original alignment of U.S. Route 9W (US 9W). The road runs 1.86 miles (2.99 km) from an intersection with Central Boulevard in Fort Lee (also designated as Route 5) up Palisade Avenue in downtown Fort Lee. There it becomes known as Lemoine Avenue, terminating at an interchange with US 9W, the Palisades Interstate Parkway and Route 445S in Fort Lee. The route was designated originally as a portion of State Highway Route 18N in 1923, and was split up in 1929 as part of present-day Route 63, US 9W and Route 67 for Routes S-1, 1 and Route S1A. Route S-1-A remained intact on Palisades and Lemoine Avenue until the 1953 state highway renumbering when it was switched over to Route 67. The route has remained virtually intact since.

== Route description ==
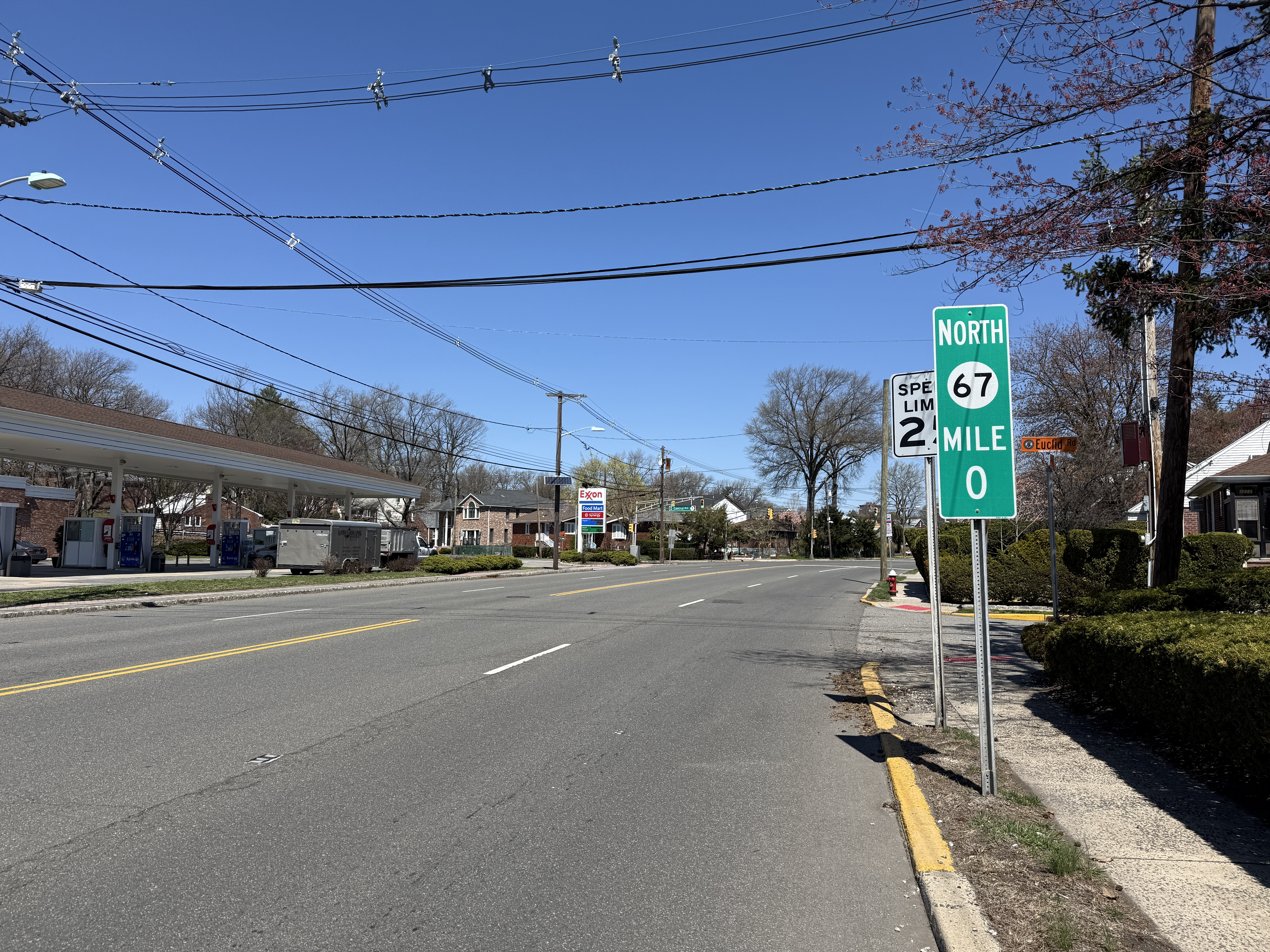
View north at the south end of Route 67 at Route 5 in Fort Lee

Route 67 begins at an intersection with New Jersey Route 5 in the community of Fort Lee. The route heads northward as Palisade Avenue, crossing on a small interchange past commercial businesses and residential homes. The highway continues, crossing directly as the main road in the community, and passing through a large residential district. Route 67 begins to turn northeastward, passing to the west of several cliffside apartment high rises and the local tennis courts. The high-rises and residential homes continue to surrounded the highway for a distance, until reaching a fork in the highway with Lemoine Avenue. There, Palisade Avenue forks to the right while Route 67 heads to the left along Lemoine. After the fork, the highway becomes more residential and commercial, with the cliffside high-rises following Palisade Avenue to the east. A short distance, Route 67 forks again with Schlosser Street, intersecting with County Route 12 (Main Street).

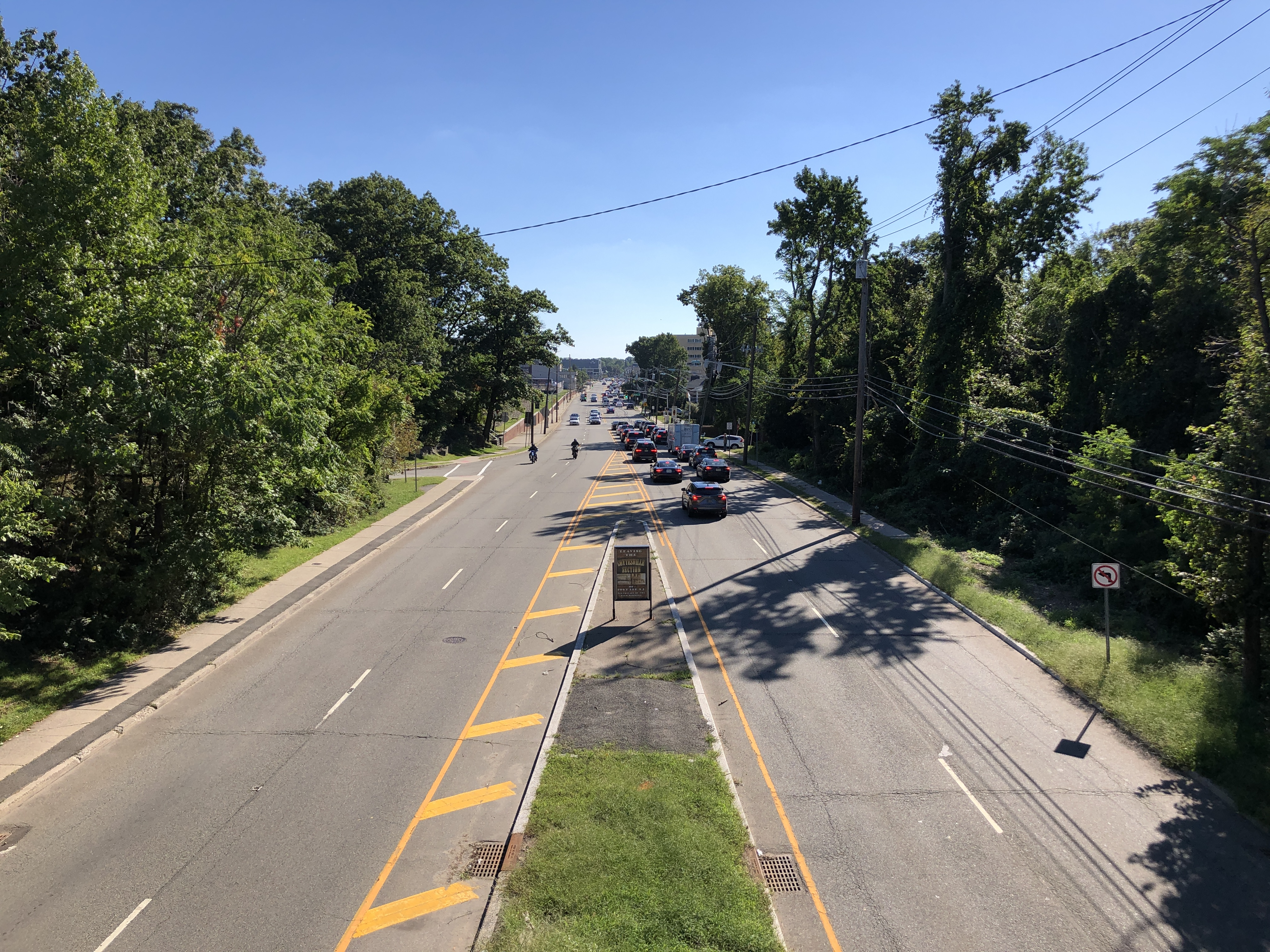
View southbound along Route 67 at US 9W and the Palisades Parkway in Fort Lee

Route 67 and Lemoine Avenue continues northward as a four-lane boulevard through Fort Lee, reaching Bridge Plaza, which serves commercial industry around the George Washington Bridge. The route then crosses over Interstate 95, U.S. Routes 1, 9 and 46 as a three-lane truss bridge. After crossing the highways, Route 67 and Lemoine Avenue continue northward out of Bridge Plaza and returns as a four-lane local boulevard in the middle of high-rises and residential homes. Route 67 passes the local high school before reaching an interchange with U.S. Route 9W, the Palisades Interstate Parkway (Route 445) and Route 445S (the Fort Lee Spur), where the designation ends. Lemoine Avenue continues northward as U.S. Route 9W.

== History ==
Route S1A
- Location: Fort Lee
- Existed: 1927–1953

The alignment of Route 67 originates as a portion of State Highway Route 18N, a state highway that survived the 1927 state highway renumbering from its commissioning in 1923. State Highway Route 18N lasted only two years after the 1927 renumbering, being designed as part of State Highway Route S-1 and State Highway Route 1 and State Highway Route S-1-A, which was designated along current Route 67 as a spur of Route S-1. State Highway Route S-1-A remained intact until the second state highway renumbering on January 1, 1953, when it was re-designated as Route 67. The alignment of Route 67 has remained virtually untouched since the 1953 renumbering. On December 8, 1977, the New Jersey Department of Transportation approved a measure that Route 67 in downtown Fort Lee was declared a No Passing Zone.

== Major intersections ==
The entire route is in Fort Lee, Bergen County.

mi	km	Destinations	Notes
0.00	0.00	Route 5 (Central Boulevard)	Southern terminus
1.37	2.20	I-95 (George Washington Bridge Upper Level) / Hudson Terrace (CR 505) to N.J. Turnpike south	Exit 73 on I-95
1.81	2.91	Palisades Parkway north	Interchange; access via Route 445S; northbound exit and southbound entrance
1.86	2.99	US 9W north – Englewood Cliffs	Northern terminus
1.000 mi = 1.609 km; 1.000 km = 0.621 mi
