= New Jersey Route 63 =

State highway in New Jersey, US

Route 63
- Bergen Boulevard

Route information
- Maintained by the New Jersey Department of Transportation
- Length: 3.09 mi (4.97 km)
- Existed: January 1, 1953–present

Major junctions
- South end: CR 501 in North Bergen
- Route 5 in Ridgefield; CR 501 in Palisades Park
- North end: US 1-9 / US 46 in Fort Lee

Location
- Country: United States
- State: New Jersey
- Counties: Hudson, Bergen

Highway system
- New Jersey State Highway Routes; Interstate; US; State; Scenic Byways
← Route 62	→ Route 64

Route 63 is a short, 3.09-mile (4.97 km) long state highway in Hudson and Bergen counties in New Jersey. The route is known as Bergen Boulevard and concurrent with County Route 501 for most of its alignment. The southern terminus is at Kennedy Boulevard and County Route 501 in North Bergen. The route crosses the county line and heads along the boulevard through the communities of Ridgefield, Palisades Park, and Fort Lee before reaching its northern terminus at an interchange with U.S. Route 1-9 and 46 in Fort Lee.

Route 63 originated in 1927 as the alignment of Route S1, which ran along the current alignment as a spur of New Jersey Route 1. The designated route's southern terminus was at Hudson County West Boulevard (now Kennedy Boulevard), northward to State Highway Route 1, State Highway Route 6 and U.S. Routes 1-9 and 46. The route had one suffixed spur, State Highway Route S-1-A, (now an alignment of New Jersey Route 67) until the 1953 New Jersey state highway renumbering on January 1 of that year. That day, Route S-1 was decommissioned and replaced by Route 63.

== Route description ==
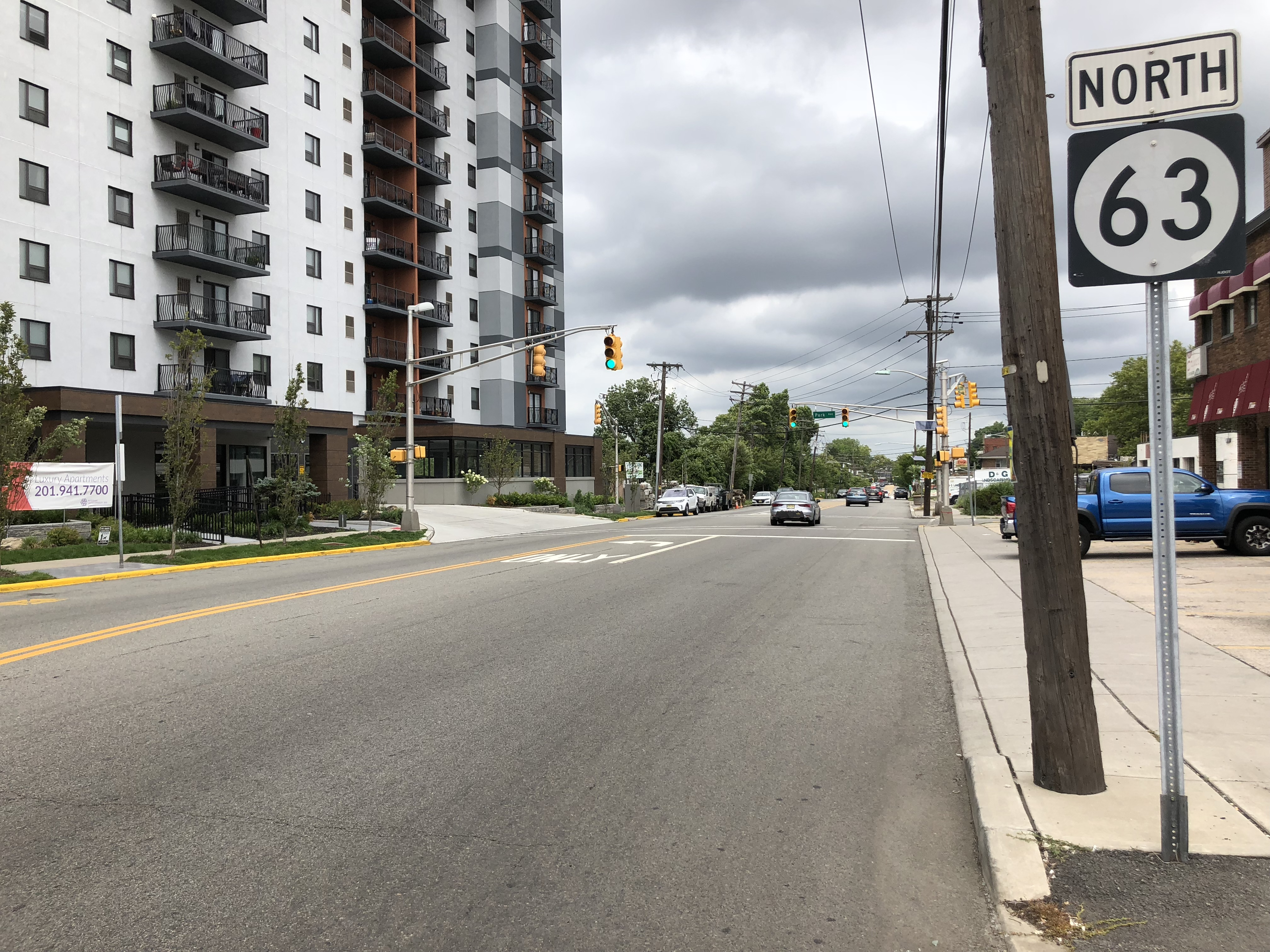
View north along Route 63 between Morningside Avenue and Park Avenue in Fairview.

Route 63 begins at an intersection between County Route 501 and Kennedy Boulevard in the community of North Bergen in Hudson County. The route progresses northward, concurrent with County Route 501, from the intersection along Bergen Boulevard, passing through a large residential and commercial community, passing to the east of the Fairview Cemetery, located in Fairview. After crossing into Bergen County, Routes 63 and 501 continue further, passing over County Route 48 (Fairview Avenue) on an overpass. Bergen Boulevard passes through the partial-residential/commercial community for a distance, becoming a divided highway until an intersection with Cliff Street. At Cliff Street, the right-of-ways come back together, and the highway itself passes the Mount Moriah Cemetery near a large high-rise.

Routes 63 and 501 continues northward, passing a small set of tankers near the cemetery. There, the route returns to the commercial-residential split it once was, continuing through Ridgefield and into Fort Lee. At an intersection with a connector to Route 5, Routes 63 and 501 fork, with both routes heading to the west while a second Bergen Boulevard heads to the east. The two designated routes continue northward through the residential communities as Bergen Boulevard, entering the municipality of Palisades Park soon afterwards. Routes 63 and 501 continue northward, passing local businesses and residences on its way to the terminus of Route 63 at an interchange with US 1-9 and US 46. County Route 501 continues towards Route 93.

== History ==
Route S1
- Location: Ridgefield–Fort Lee
- Existed: 1927–1953

During the 1927 New Jersey state highway renumbering by the New Jersey State Highway Department, the alignment of current-day Route 63 was designated as State Highway Route S-1, a spur off of New Jersey Route 1. The route began at the Hudson County West Boulevard (now Kennedy Boulevard), heading northbound to Ridgefield, where it would meet Route 1, Route 6, U.S. Route 1, U.S. Route 9 and U.S. Route 46. Both intersections are now the termini to Route 63. Two years later, a remade legislation was performed in the New Jersey State Legislature, redefining the alignment for State Highway Route S-1, with the southern terminus changing to Hudson County Boulevard, a rename to the original southern terminus. Also, the northern terminus was then defined as being in Fort Lee.

State Highway Route S-1 remained intact for the next two decades, and along with a suffixed spur, State Highway Route S-1-A, the two routes were thoroughfares through the southern Palisades. On January 1, 1953, the New Jersey State Highway Department went ahead with a second state highway renumbering. Route S-1 and its suffixed spur, Route S-1-A, were decommissioned in favor of new designations. State Highway Route S-1 became Route 63 while its suffixed spur became Route 67. Route 63 follows the same alignment as Route S-1 with no change in termini since the 1953 renumbering.

== Major intersections ==
County	Location	mi	km	Destinations	Notes
Hudson	North Bergen	0.00	0.00	CR 501 south (Kennedy Boulevard)	Continuation south; southern end of CR 501 concurrency
Bergen	Fort Lee	1.92	3.09	Route 5 – Ridgefield, Edgewater	Access via Bergen Boulevard
Bergen	Palisades Park	2.54	4.09	CR 501 north (Central Boulevard) – Palisades Park	Northern end of CR 501 concurrency
Bergen	Fort Lee	3.19	5.13	US 1-9 north / US 46 east	Northern terminus
1.000 mi = 1.609 km; 1.000 km = 0.621 mi: Concurrency terminus
