= Palisades Park, New Jersey =

Borough in Bergen County, New Jersey, US

- Borough
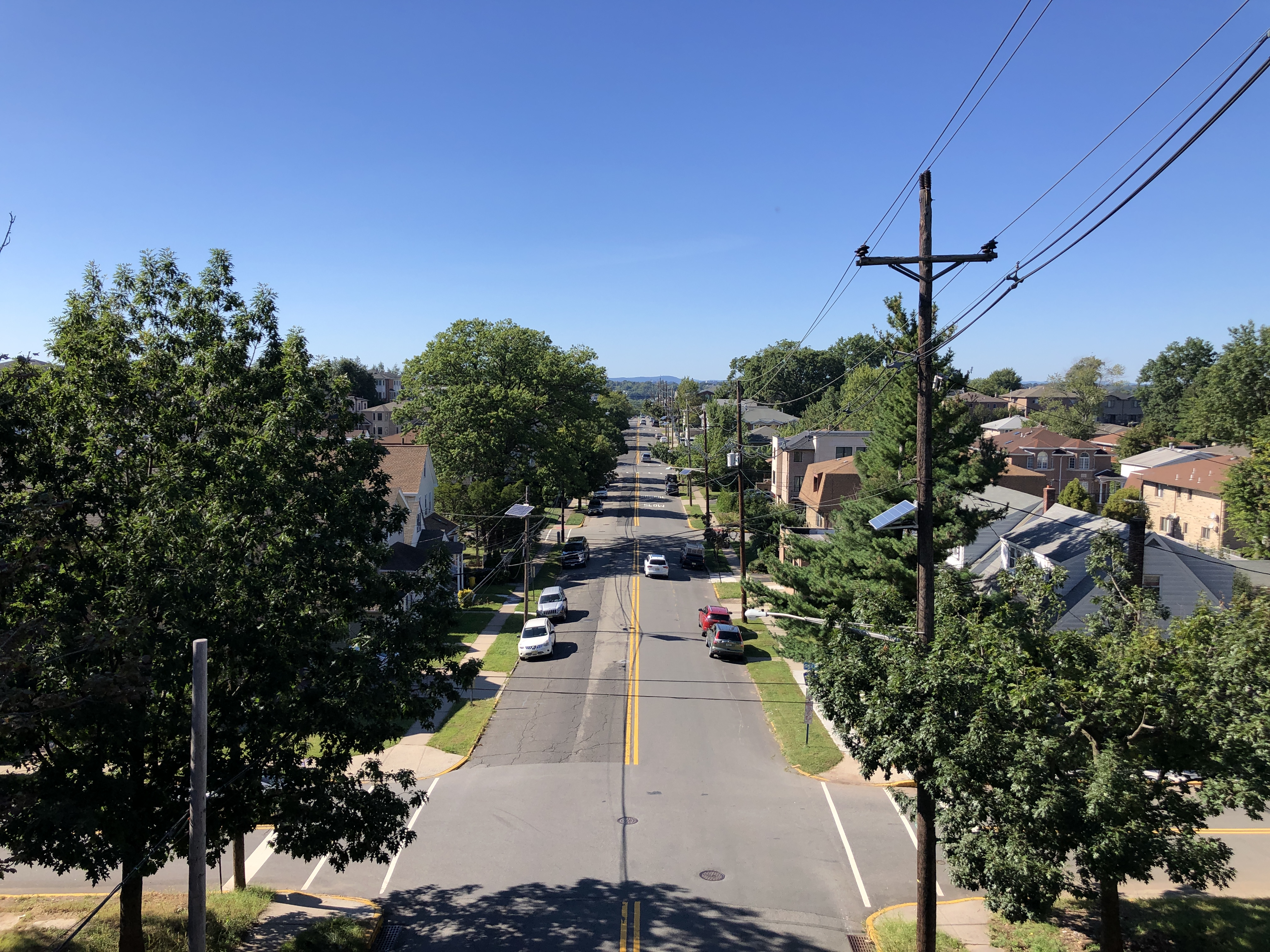
- Aerial view in 2021

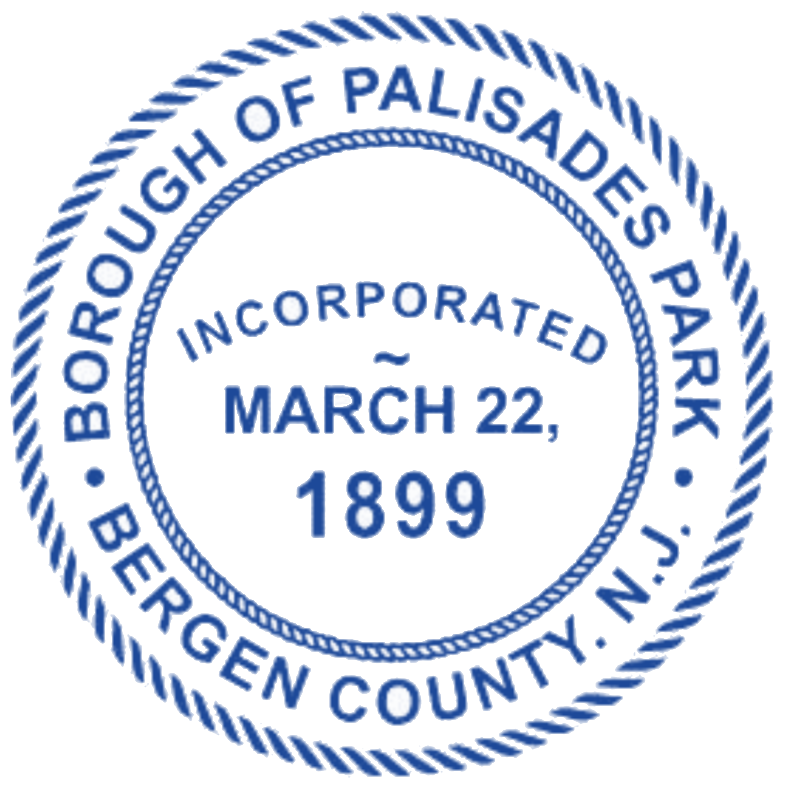
- Seal

- Location of Palisades Park in Bergen County highlighted in red (left). Inset map: Location of Bergen County in New Jersey highlighted in orange (right).

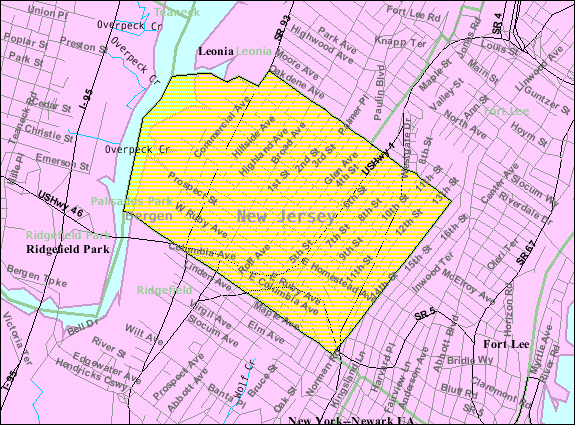
- Census Bureau map of Palisades Park, New Jersey

- Location in Bergen County Location in New Jersey Location in the United States
- Coordinates: 40.847017°N 73.997061°W
- Country: United States
- State: New Jersey
- County: Bergen
- Incorporated: March 22, 1899

Government
  - Type: Borough
  - Body: Borough Council
  - Mayor: Chong "Paul" Kim (D, term ends December 31, 2026)
  - Administrator: Roberta Stern
  - Municipal clerk: Sophia Jang

Area
  - Total: 1.28 sq mi (3.32 km^{2})
  - Land: 1.24 sq mi (3.21 km^{2})
  - Water: 0.042 sq mi (0.11 km^{2}) 3.28%
  - Rank: 474th of 565 in state 60th of 70 in county
- Elevation: 112 ft (34 m)

Population (2020)
  - Total: 20,292
  - Estimate (2023): 20,102
  - Rank: 136th of 565 in state 15th of 70 in county
  - Density: 16,377.7/sq mi (6,323.5/km^{2})
  - Rank: 14th of 565 in state 3rd of 70 in county
- Time zone: UTC−05:00 (Eastern (EST))
  - Summer (DST): UTC−04:00 (Eastern (EDT))
- ZIP Code: 07650
- Area code: 201
- FIPS code: 3400355770
- GNIS feature ID: 0885338
- Website: mypalisadespark.com

Palisades Park is a borough in Bergen County, in the U.S. state of New Jersey. As of the 2020 United States census, the borough's population was 20,292, an increase of 670 (+3.4%) from the 2010 census count of 19,622, which in turn reflected an increase of 2,549 (+14.9%) from the 17,073 counted in the 2000 census.

The borough of Palisades Park was created by an act of the New Jersey Legislature on March 22, 1899, from portions of Ridgefield Township. A portion of its area was annexed by the neighboring borough of Fort Lee in April 1909. The borough was named for its location atop the New Jersey Palisades.

It is one of the largest and fastest-growing ethnic Korean enclaves outside of Korea. Koreans comprise the majority (65%) of the population of the borough of Palisades Park, the municipality with the highest density of ethnic Koreans in the Western Hemisphere and the home of both the highest Korean-American density and percentage of any municipality in the United States. It has been called Koreatown on the Hudson and Little Korea. The borough's population has grown by 40% since the 1990 census, accelerated by zoning laws that permit duplex homes on land previously containing a single-family detached home.

== Geography ==
According to the U.S. Census Bureau, the borough had a total area of 1.28 square miles (3.32 km^{2}), including 1.24 square miles (3.21 km^{2}) of land and 0.04 square miles (0.11 km^{2}) of water (3.28%).

The borough borders Fort Lee, Leonia, Ridgefield and Ridgefield Park. Morsemere is a neighborhood largely in the northern part of Ridgefield straddling the southern border of Palisades Park.

The town's central business district centered around Broad Avenue has been called Koreatown. In mid-2015, a proposal was submitted by the Korean-American Association of Palisades Park to the mayor and council to add a second name to Broad Avenue, such as "Korean Market Street" (Meokjagolmok) or "Korea Way".

== History ==
Until the 1980s, Palisades Park was overwhelmingly white, a mix of blue-collar workers and professionals whose families originated largely from Italy, Croatia, Germany, and Greece. Its houses were inexpensive, and it had a number of vacant shops and offices. In the 1990s, a continuous stream of Korean immigrants emerged into Palisades Park. A substantial number of affluent and educated Korean American professionals have settled in Bergen County since the early 2000s and have founded various academic and communally supportive organizations, including the Korean Parent Partnership Organization at the Bergen County Academies magnet high school and the Korean-American Association of New Jersey. Approximately 120 Korean stores were counted in Palisades Park in 2000, a number which has risen significantly since then, featuring restaurants and karaoke (noraebang) bars, grocery markets, education centers and bookstores, financial institutions, offices, electronics vendors, apparel boutiques, and other commercial enterprises.

In May 2012, borough officials rejected requests by two diplomatic delegations from Japan to remove a small monument from a public park, a brass plaque on a block of stone, dedicated in 2010 to the memory of comfort women, tens of thousands of women and girls, many Korean, who were forced into sexual slavery by Japanese soldiers during World War II. Days later, a South Korean delegation endorsed the borough's decision. The first Japanese delegation cited apologies offered by their country's government for its involvement as justifying the removal of the monument, while officials from the second delegation controversially claimed that "comfort women were a lie". However, in neighboring Fort Lee, various Korean American groups could not reach consensus on the design and wording for such a monument as of early April 2013.

In May 2014, the Palisades Park Public Library created a memorial dedicated to the victims of the tragic sinking of the Sewol ferry off the South Korean coast on April 16, 2014.

== Demographics ==
The per capita Korean American population of Bergen County, 6.3% by the 2010 United States census, (increasing to 6.9% by the 2011 American Community Survey), is the highest of any county in the United States, with all of the nation's top ten municipalities by percentage of Korean population and an absolute total of 56,773 Korean Americans (increasing to 63,247 by the 2011 American Community Survey) living in the county. The concentration of Korean Americans in Palisades Park in turn is the highest of any municipality in the United States, at 52% of the population, enumerating 10,115 residents of Korean ancestry as of the 2010 Census. Palisades Park has been referred to as the Korean village. Along with Koreatowns in New York City and Long Island, Bergen County serves as the nexus for an overall Korean American population of 218,764 individuals in the Greater New York Combined Statistical Area, the second largest population of ethnic Koreans outside of Korea.

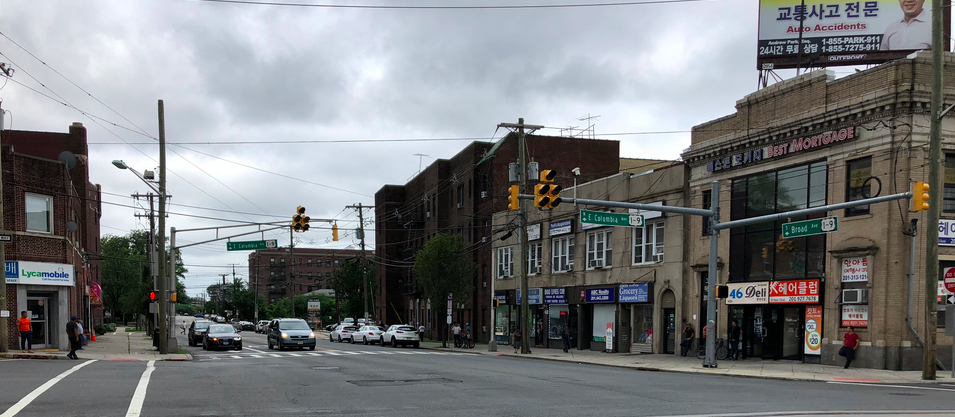
Broad Avenue, Koreatown in Palisades Park (벼랑 공원 코리아타운). Click on image to view Hangul signs.

Historical population
Census	Pop.	Note	%±
1900	644		—
1910	1,411		119.1%
1920	2,633		86.6%
1930	7,065		168.3%
1940	8,141		15.2%
1950	9,635		18.4%
1960	11,943		24.0%
1970	13,351		11.8%
1980	13,732		2.9%
1990	14,536		5.9%
2000	17,073		17.5%
2010	19,622		14.9%
2020	20,292		3.4%
2023 (est.)	20,102	▼	−0.9%
Population sources: 1900–1920 1900–1910; 1910–1930 1900–2020; 2000 2010 2020

=== Racial and ethnic composition ===
Palisades Park borough, New Jersey – Racial and ethnic composition Note: the US Census treats Hispanic/Latino as an ethnic category. This table excludes Latinos from the racial categories and assigns them to a separate category. Hispanics/Latinos may be of any race.
Race / Ethnicity (NH = Non-Hispanic)	Pop 2000	Pop 2010	Pop 2020	% 2000	% 2010	% 2020
White alone (NH)	6,668	4,213	2,903	39.06%	21.47%	14.31%
Black or African American alone (NH)	176	283	262	1.03%	1.44%	1.29%
Native American or Alaska Native alone (NH)	13	7	10	0.08%	0.04%	0.05%
Asian alone (NH)	7,010	11,312	11,900	41.06%	57.65%	58.64%
Native Hawaiian or Pacific Islander alone (NH)	3	3	6	0.02%	0.02%	0.03%
Other race alone (NH)	45	68	93	0.26%	0.35%	0.46%
Mixed race or Multiracial (NH)	345	161	256	2.02%	0.82%	1.26%
Hispanic or Latino (any race)	2,813	3,575	4,862	16.48%	18.22%	23.96%
Total	17,073	19,622	20,292	100.00%	100.00%	100.00%

=== 2020 census ===
As of the 2020 census, Palisades Park had a population of 20,292. The median age was 40.1 years. 16.5% of residents were under the age of 18 and 14.7% were 65 years of age or older. For every 100 females, there were 97.4 males, and for every 100 females age 18 and over there were 95.9 males age 18 and over.

100.0% of residents lived in urban areas, while 0.0% lived in rural areas.

There were 7,314 households in Palisades Park, of which 26.7% had children under the age of 18 living in them. Of all households, 49.6% were married-couple households, 19.7% were households with a male householder and no spouse or partner present, and 26.7% were households with a female householder and no spouse or partner present. About 20.4% of all households were made up of individuals and 6.8% had someone living alone who was 65 years of age or older.

There were 7,668 housing units, of which 4.6% were vacant. The homeowner vacancy rate was 1.3% and the rental vacancy rate was 3.2%.

=== 2010 census ===
The 2010 United States census counted 19,622 people, 6,934 households, and 5,020 families in the borough. The population density was 15,681.6 per square mile (6,054.7/km^{2}). There were 7,362 housing units at an average density of 5,883.6 per square mile (2,271.7/km^{2}). The racial makeup was 28.90% (5,670) White, 1.96% (385) Black or African American, 0.31% (60) Native American, 57.84% (11,350) Asian, 0.05% (10) Pacific Islander, 9.00% (1,765) from other races, and 1.95% (382) from two or more races. Hispanic or Latino of any race were 18.22% (3,575) of the population.

Of the 6,934 households, 26.1% had children under the age of 18; 53.7% were married couples living together; 11.9% had a female householder with no husband present and 27.6% were non-families. Of all households, 19.8% were made up of individuals and 6.0% had someone living alone who was 65 years of age or older. The average household size was 2.83 and the average family size was 3.20.

16.5% of the population were under the age of 18, 8.5% from 18 to 24, 37.9% from 25 to 44, 25.6% from 45 to 64, and 11.4% who were 65 years of age or older. The median age was 37.0 years. For every 100 females, the population had 99.7 males. For every 100 females ages 18 and older there were 98.3 males.

As of the 2010 Census, 51.5% of the population (10,115) reported themselves as being of Korean ancestry, with both the highest Korean-American density and percentage of any municipality in the United States. Broad Avenue has been characterized as a major epicenter of Korean American life. Based on data from the 2012-2016 American Community Survey, 80.9% of borough residents did not speak English as their dominant language, the third-highest percentage in the state; the Korean language is spoken at home by more than half of the residents of Palisades Park.

Same-sex couples headed 41 households in 2010, an increase from the 37 counted in 2000.

The Census Bureau's 2006–2010 American Community Survey showed that (in 2010 inflation-adjusted dollars) median household income was $55,602 (with a margin of error of +/− $7,300) and the median family income was $66,725 (+/− $8,196). Males had a median income of $43,919 (+/− $8,170) versus $46,014 (+/− $6,780) for females. The per capita income for the borough was $30,666 (+/− $2,900). About 12.0% of families and 14.4% of the population were below the poverty line, including 18.6% of those under age 18 and 15.2% of those age 65 or over.

=== 2000 census ===
As of the 2000 United States census there were 17,073 people, 6,247 households, and 4,447 families residing in the borough. The population density was 14,112.4 inhabitants per square mile (5,448.8/km^{2}). There were 6,386 housing units at an average density of 5,278.6 per square mile (2,038.1/km^{2}). The racial makeup of the borough was 48.27% White, 1.38% African American, 0.19% Native American, 41.09% Asian, 0.03% Pacific Islander, 5.80% from other races, and 3.24% from two or more races. Hispanic or Latino of any race were 16.48% of the population.

In 2000, 36.38% of Palisades Park residents identified as being of Korean heritage. This was the highest percentage of Korean Americans of any place in the country with 1,000 or more residents identifying their ancestry and more than double that of second-ranked Cerritos, California. Also in the 2000 Census, 3.1% of Palisades Park's residents identified themselves as being of Croatian ancestry. This was the second highest percentage of people with Croatian ancestry in any place in New Jersey with 1,000 or more residents identifying their ancestry.

There were 6,247 households, out of which 30.6% had children under the age of 18 living with them, 54.9% were married couples living together, 10.4% had a female householder with no husband present, and 28.8% were non-families. 22.9% of all households were made up of individuals, and 8.1% had someone living alone who was 65 years of age or older. The average household size was 2.73 and the average family size was 3.20.

In the borough, the population was spread out, with 19.4% under the age of 18, 9.1% from 18 to 24, 37.8% from 25 to 44, 21.7% from 45 to 64, and 12.1% who were 65 years of age or older. The median age was 36 years. For every 100 females, there were 99.1 males. For every 100 females age 18 and over, there were 97.8 males.

The median income for a household in the borough was $48,015, and the median income for a family was $54,503. Males had a median income of $37,204 versus $31,997 for females. The per capita income for the borough was $22,607. About 8.5% of families and 9.7% of the population were below the poverty line, including 9.9% of those under age 18 and 12.1% of those age 65 or over.

== Government ==
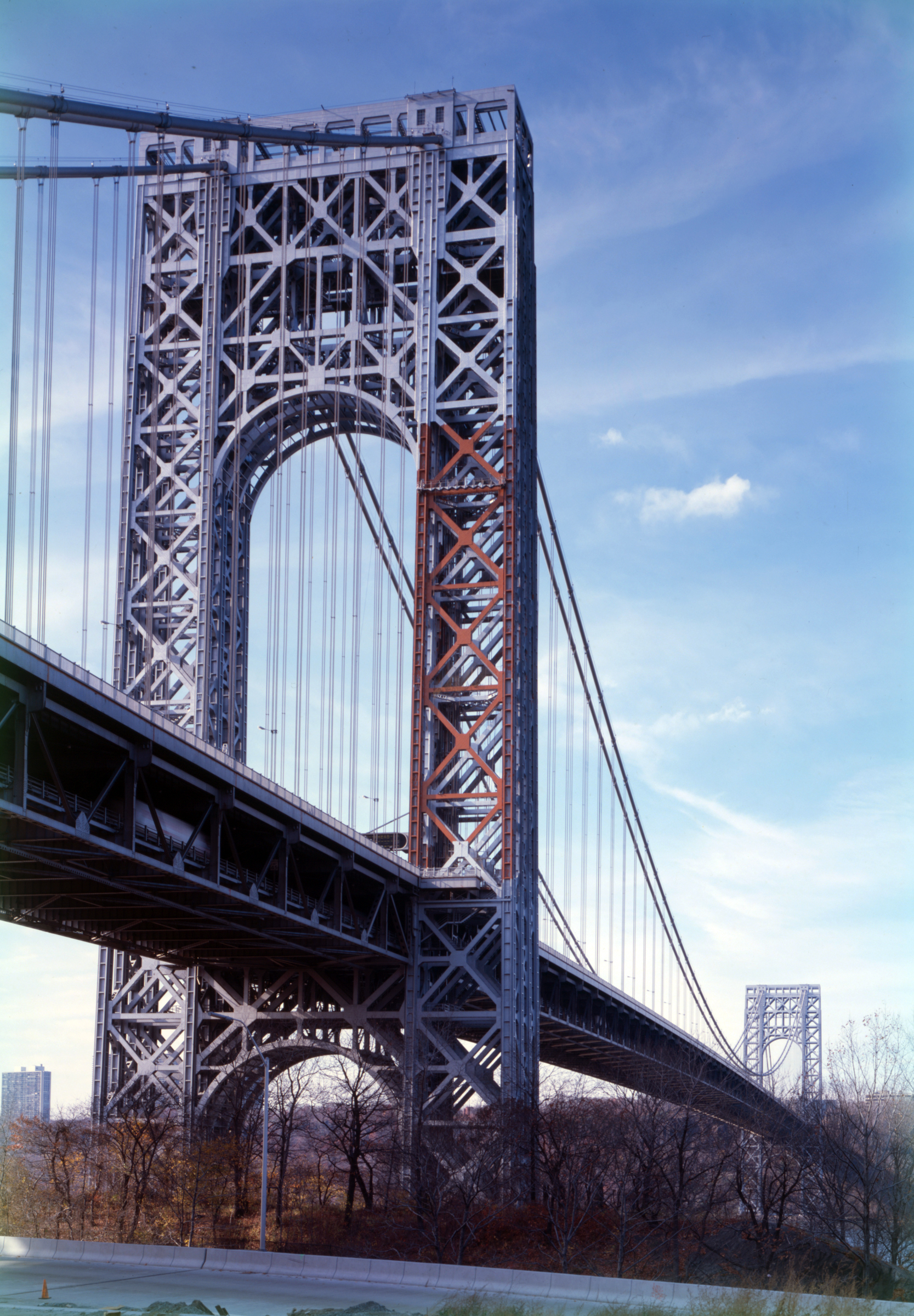
The nearby George Washington Bridge, the world's busiest motor vehicle bridge, provides access to Palisades Park from Manhattan in New York City via adjacent Fort Lee.

=== Local government ===
Palisades Park is governed under the borough form of New Jersey municipal government, which is used in 218 municipalities (of the 564) statewide, making it the most common form of government in New Jersey. The government is comprised of a mayor and a borough council, with all positions elected at-large on a partisan basis as part of the November general election. A mayor is elected directly by the voters to a four-year term of office. The borough council includes six members elected to serve three-year terms on a staggered basis, with two seats coming up for election each year in a three-year cycle. The borough form of government used by Palisades Park is a "weak mayor / strong council" government in which council members act as the legislative body with the mayor presiding at meetings and voting only in the event of a tie. The mayor can veto ordinances subject to an override by a two-thirds majority vote of the council. The mayor makes committee and liaison assignments for council members, and most appointments are made by the mayor with the advice and consent of the council.

In July 2015 Gina S. Kim became the borough's municipal clerk, reflecting the growing political influence of the Korean American population. Korean Americans, who compose more than half of the borough's population and have attended town meetings in large numbers, have requested Korean interpreters to be present at these meetings as of August 2016. In 2017, the borough created a Korean language version of its website.

As of 2023, the mayor of Palisades Park is Democrat Chong "Paul" Kim, whose term of office ends December 31, 2026. His predecessor, Christopher Chung, was the first Korean-American mayor in Bergen County, and second ever in New Jersey. Members of the Palisades Park Borough Council are Council President Cynthia A. Pirrera (D, 2023), Stephanie S. Jang (R, 2024), Son K. "Andy" Min (D, 2025), Suk Min (D, 2024; appointed to serve an unexpired term), Jae K. Park (R, 2023) and Michael P. Vietri (D, 2025).

After Chong "Paul" Kim took office as mayor in January 2023, the borough council declined to pick from one of the three candidates nominated by the Democratic municipal committee and chose Andy Min to fill the council seat he had held expiring in December 2024, after which the Democratic committee chose Suk Min to fill the seat. With two people chosen to fill the seat, the Democratic committee and a group of three elected officials prevailed in a suit, with a judge deciding to give the vacant seat to Suk Min.

During the 2018 primary election for mayor, former mayor James Rotundo's mother Lorraine Rotundo went on a "racist tirade" on Facebook two days after the primary election. The race was extremely close with Christopher Chung winning by a narrow margin. Lorraine Rotundo made the post in response to the massive number of Koreans at the voting booths. She stated that Palisades Park should "go to hell," and said that the Korean residents could "have this F'n town." She later went on to post that only English should be spoken in the Borough Hall. Former mayor James Rotundo apologized on behalf of his mother and strongly denounced her comments. "I'm disgusted with her statement," he said. Rotundo claimed that he was not raised by these sentiments.

Christopher Chung was sworn into office as a council member in January 2014, having been selected by the council from among three names submitted by the Democratic Municipal Committee to fill the vacant seat of Jason Kim, who had resigned earlier that month.

=== Federal, state and county representation ===
Palisades Park is located in the 5th Congressional District and is part of New Jersey's 37th state legislative district.

In redistricting following the 2010 census, the borough was in the 9th congressional district, which was in effect from 2013 to 2022.

For the 119th United States Congress, New Jersey's 5th congressional district is represented by Josh Gottheimer (D, Wyckoff). New Jersey is represented in the United States Senate by Democrats Cory Booker (Newark, term ends 2027) and Andy Kim (Moorestown, term ends 2031).

For the 2026–2027 session, the 37th legislative district of the New Jersey Legislature is represented in the New Jersey Senate by Gordon M. Johnson (D, Englewood) and in the General Assembly by Shama Haider (D, Tenafly) and Ellen Park (D, Englewood Cliffs).

Bergen County is governed by a directly elected County Executive, with legislative functions performed by a Board of County Commissioners comprised of seven members who are elected at-large to three-year terms in partisan elections on a staggered basis, with either two or three seats coming up for election each November; a Chairman and Vice Chairman are selected from among its seven members at a reorganization meeting held every January. As of 2025, the county executive is James J. Tedesco III (D, Paramus), whose four-year term of office ends December 31, 2026.

Bergen County's Commissioners are Chair Mary J. Amoroso (D, Mahwah, 2025), Vice Chair Steven A. Tanelli (D, North Arlington, 2027), Chair Pro Tem Joan Voss (D, Fort Lee, 2026), Rafael Marte (D, Bergenfield, 2026), Germaine M. Ortiz (D, Emerson, 2025), Thomas J. Sullivan Jr. (D, Montvale, 2025) and Tracy Silna Zur (D, Franklin Lakes, 2027).

Bergen County's elected constitutional officials are Clerk John S. Hogan (D, Northvale, 2026), Sheriff Anthony Cureton (D, Englewood, 2027) and Surrogate Michael R. Dressler (D, Cresskill, 2026).

=== Politics ===
United States presidential election results for Palisades Park 2024 2020 2016 2012 2008 2004
Year	Republican		Democratic		Third party(ies)	
Year	No.	%	No.	%	No.	%
2024	2,374	45.99%	2,708	52.46%	80	1.55%
2020	2,440	38.63%	3,831	60.65%	46	0.73%
2016	1,494	32.83%	2,968	65.22%	89	1.96%
2012	1,147	31.23%	2,487	67.71%	39	1.06%
2008	1,746	39.34%	2,646	59.62%	46	1.04%
2004	1,830	40.65%	2,650	58.86%	22	0.49%

As of March 2011, there were 6,410 registered voters, of which 1,839 (28.7% vs. 31.7% countywide) were registered as Democrats, 1,128 (17.6% vs. 21.1%) were registered as Republicans and 3,443 (53.7% vs. 47.1%) were registered as Unaffiliated. There were no voters registered to other parties. Among the borough's 2010 Census population, 32.7% (vs. 57.1% in Bergen County) were registered to vote, including 39.1% of those ages 18 and over (vs. 73.7% countywide).

Gubernatorial election results for Palisades Park
Year	Republican		Democratic		Third party(ies)	
Year	No.	%	No.	%	No.	%
2025	1,155	36.92%	1,962	62.72%	11	0.35%
2021	1,098	45.11%	1,319	54.19%	17	0.70%
2017	618	36.57%	1,043	61.72%	29	1.72%
2013	919	50.61%	864	47.58%	33	1.82%
2009	913	36.29%	1,498	59.54%	105	4.17%
2005	776	30.16%	1,741	67.66%	56	2.18%

In the 2012 presidential election, Democrat Barack Obama received 2,487 votes here (67.1% vs. 54.8% countywide), ahead of Republican Mitt Romney with 1,147 votes (31.0% vs. 43.5%), for a turnout of 53.5% (vs. 70.4% in Bergen County).

In the 2013 gubernatorial election, Republican Chris Christie received 50.6% of the vote (919 cast), ahead of Democrat Barbara Buono with 47.6% (864 votes), and other candidates with 1.8% (33 votes), among the 1,878 ballots cast by the borough's 6,473 registered voters (62 ballots were spoiled), for a turnout of 29.0%.

United States Senate election results for Palisades Park1
Year	Republican		Democratic		Third party(ies)	
Year	No.	%	No.	%	No.	%
2024	1,610	33.69%	3,089	64.64%	80	1.67%
2018	1,048	34.08%	1,922	62.50%	105	3.41%
2012	983	29.14%	2,343	69.46%	47	1.39%
2006	981	35.88%	1,725	63.09%	28	1.02%

United States Senate election results for Palisades Park2
Year	Republican		Democratic		Third party(ies)	
Year	No.	%	No.	%	No.	%
2020	2,070	34.66%	3,763	63.01%	139	2.33%
2014	586	30.02%	1,329	68.08%	37	1.90%
2013	375	41.39%	516	56.95%	15	1.66%
2008	1,345	33.96%	2,575	65.01%	41	1.04%

== Culture ==
Palisades Park has emerged as a dominant nexus of Korean American culture. Palisades Park High School has hosted national Kumdo martial arts tournaments.

Broad Avenue has been referred to as a "Korean food walk of fame", with diverse offerings. Palisades Park now incorporates the highest concentration of Korean restaurants within a one-mile radius in the United States, and Broad Avenue has evolved into a Korean dessert destination as well. Korean Chinese cuisine is now also available in Koreatown, as is misugaru. Bulgogi and galbi are staples on Broad Avenue in the Palisades Park. Korean cafés have become a major cultural element within Palisades Park, not only for the coffee, bingsu (shaved ice), and pastries, but also as communal gathering places.

Korean and English are both spoken prevalently in Palisades Park. Korean is spoken at home by more than half of the residents of Palisades Park and nearby Englewood Cliffs, according to U.S. Census Bureau data released in 2017. Retail signs using Hangul are ubiquitous. In 1996, an ordinance was passed that storefront signage be same size in English as in Korean.

Additionally, as of 2010, more than 15 percent of Palisades Park's residents speak Spanish.

== Education ==
The Palisades Park Public School District serves students in pre-kindergarten through twelfth grade. As of the 2022–23 school year, the district, comprised of three schools, had an enrollment of 1,786 students and 145.9 classroom teachers (on an FTE basis), for a student–teacher ratio of 12.2:1. Schools in the district (with 2022–23 enrollment data from the National Center for Education Statistics) are Charles R. Smith Early Childhood Center with 242 students in grades PreK-K, Lindbergh Elementary School with 769 students in grades 1-6 and Palisades Park High School with 745 students in grades 7-12.

Public school students from the borough, and all of Bergen County, are eligible to attend the secondary education programs offered by the Bergen County Technical Schools, which include the Bergen County Academies in Hackensack, and the Bergen Tech campus in Teterboro or Paramus. The district offers programs on a shared-time or full-time basis, with admission based on a selective application process and tuition covered by the student's home school district.

According to The Record, the Korean-American Association of New Jersey petitioned Palisades Park school officials in 2013 to use textbooks that refer to the Sea of Japan as the East Sea as well.

== Transportation ==
=== Roads and highways ===
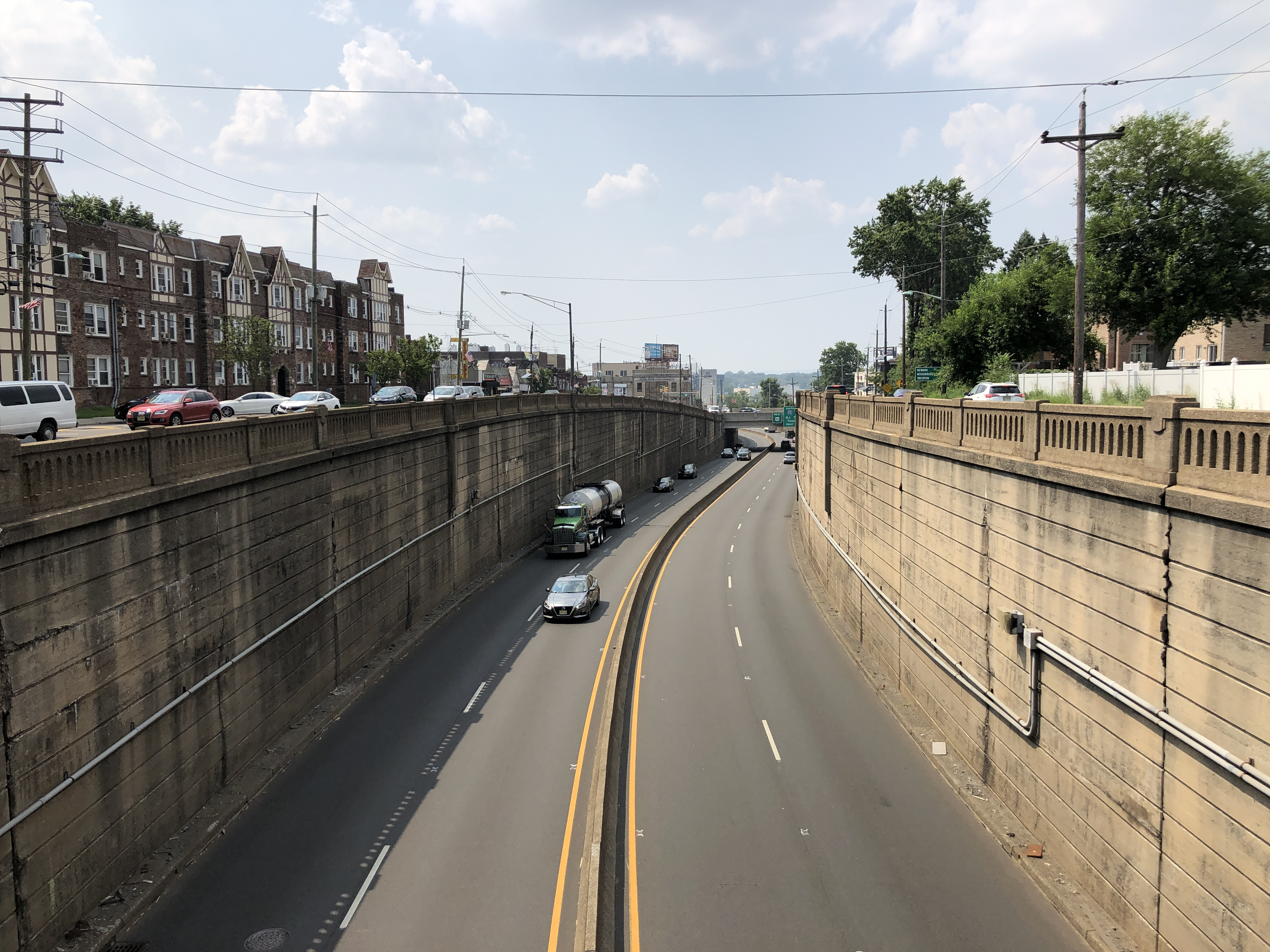
Westbound U.S. Route 46 in Palisades Park

As of May 2010, the borough had a total of 28.00 miles (45.06 km) of roadways, of which 22.80 miles (36.69 km) were maintained by the municipality, 1.01 miles (1.63 km) by Bergen County and 4.19 miles (6.74 km) by the New Jersey Department of Transportation.

Roadways in Palisades Park include U.S. Route 1/9, U.S. Route 46, Route 5, Route 63, Route 93 and County Route 501.

The nearby George Washington Bridge, the world's busiest motor vehicle bridge, provides access to Palisades Park from Manhattan in New York City via adjacent Fort Lee.

=== Public transportation ===
NJ Transit provides bus service between the borough and the Port Authority Bus Terminal in Midtown Manhattan on the 127, 154, 155, 157, 166 and 168 routes, to Jersey City on the 83 route, with local service offered on the 751 and 755 bus lines.

Rockland Coaches provides service to the Port Authority Bus Terminal on routes 11T/11AT and 20/20T.

== Notable people ==
People who were born in, residents of, or otherwise closely associated with Palisades Park include:

- Barbara Bennett (1906–1958), stage and film actress and dancer
- John J. Dickerson (1900–1966), politician who served as Mayor of Palisades Park from 1939 to 1952, and was Chairman of the New Jersey Republican State Committee
- William J. Dorgan (1921–2003), Bergen County Freeholder Director and member of the New Jersey General Assembly who served as mayor of Palisades Park from 1960 to 1967
- Don Guardian (born 1953), politician who has represented the 2nd Legislative District in the New Jersey General Assembly since 2022
- Barbara McLean (1903–1996), film editor who won the 1944 Academy Award for Film Editing for the film Wilson
- Patrick J. Roma (1949–2017), lawyer and politician who represented the 38th Legislative District in the New Jersey General Assembly from 1988 to 1997
- Elaine Romagnoli (1942–2021), businesswoman and community leader who founded and ran restaurants and lesbian bars in New York City
- V. H. Viglielmo (1926–2016), scholar and translator of Japanese literature

== See also ==
- List of U.S. cities with significant Korean-American populations

== Sources ==
- Municipal Incorporations of the State of New Jersey (according to Counties) prepared by the Division of Local Government, Department of the Treasury (New Jersey); December 1, 1958.
- Clayton, W. Woodford; and Nelson, William. History of Bergen and Passaic Counties, New Jersey, with Biographical Sketches of Many of its Pioneers and Prominent Men., Philadelphia: Everts and Peck, 1882.
- Harvey, Cornelius Burnham (ed.), Genealogical History of Hudson and Bergen Counties, New Jersey. New York: New Jersey Genealogical Publishing Co., 1900.
- Van Valen, James M. History of Bergen County, New Jersey. New York: New Jersey Publishing and Engraving Co., 1900.
- Westervelt, Frances A. (Frances Augusta), 1858–1942, History of Bergen County, New Jersey, 1630–1923, Lewis Historical Publishing Company, 1923.
