= County Route 501 (New Jersey) =

Highway in New Jersey

County Route 501
- CR 501 highlighted in red

Route information
- Length: 40.2 mi (64.7 km)
- Existed: January 1, 1953–present

Southern segment
- Length: 10.1 mi (16.3 km)
- West end: CR 529 in South Plainfield
- Major intersections: I-287 in Edison; Route 27 in Metuchen; US 1 in Edison; US 9 in Woodbridge; Route 35 / Route 440 in Perth Amboy
- East end: NY 440 at the New York state line

Northern segment
- Length: 30.1 mi (48.4 km)
- South end: NY 440 at the New York state line
- Major intersections: Route 139 in Jersey City; I-495 in Union City; Route 63 in North Bergen; Route 5 in Fort Lee; US 1-9 / US 46 in Palisades Park; Route 93 in Palisades Park; Route 4 in Englewood; CR 502 in Closter
- North end: NY 340 at the New York state line

Location
- Country: United States
- State: New Jersey
- Counties: Middlesex, Hudson, Bergen

Highway system
- County routes in New Jersey; 500-series routes
← CR 585	→ CR 502

County Route 501 (CR 501) is a county highway in New Jersey in two segments spanning Middlesex, Hudson, and Bergen counties. The southern segment runs from South Plainfield to Perth Amboy, the northern segment runs from Bayonne to Rockleigh, and the two segments are connected by NY 440 across Staten Island.

The New Jersey Department of Transportation lists CR 501 as a single highway with a length of 53.0 miles (85.3 km), which includes both road sections and the connection along NY 440.

== Route description ==
=== Middlesex County ===
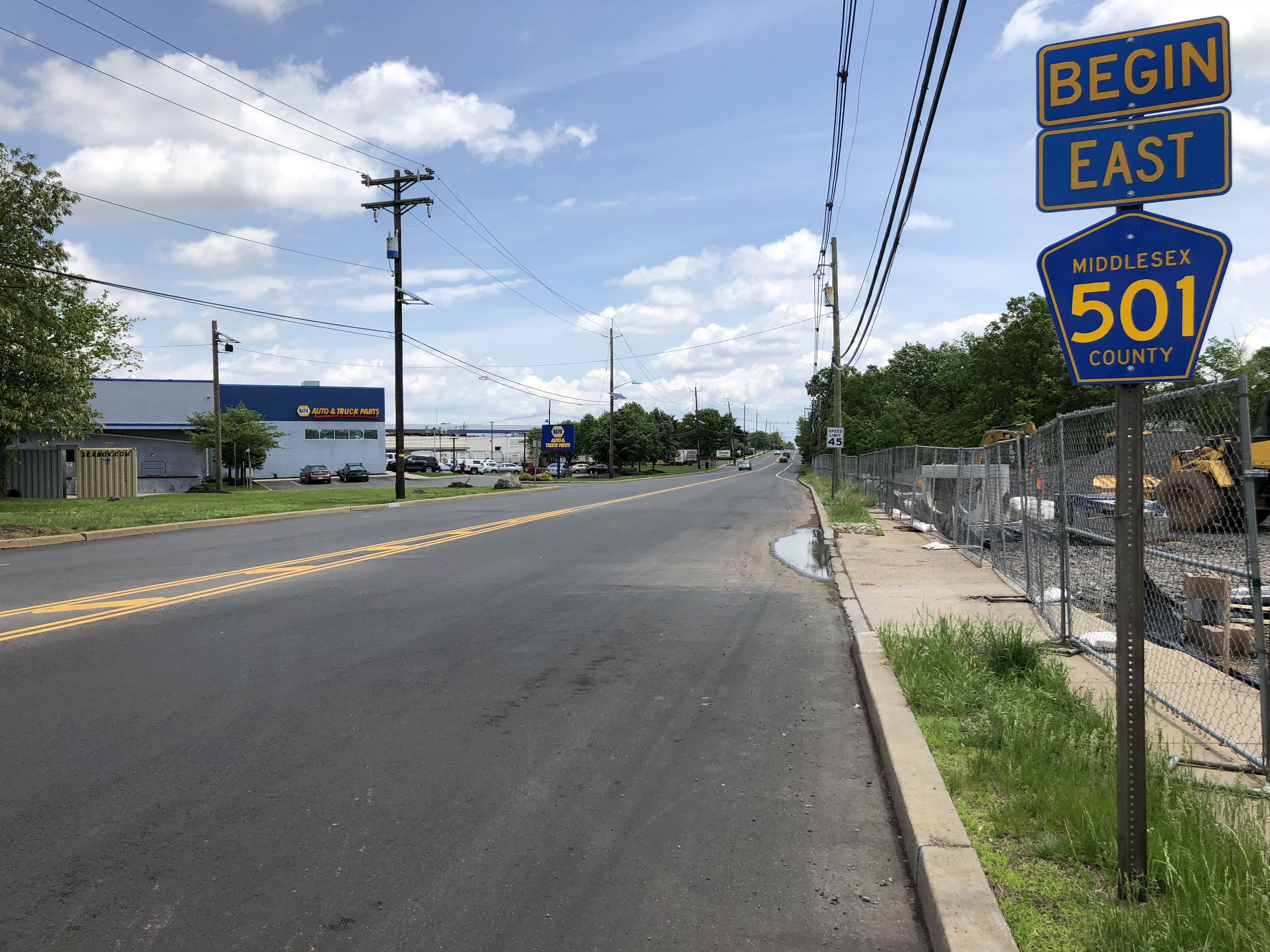
View east at the west end of CR 501 at CR 529 in South Plainfield

CR 501 is signed east-west in Middlesex County. The western (southern) terminus of CR 501 is at the intersection of Stelton Road (CR 529) in South Plainfield. From there, the route heads east to Metuchen, where it has a short concurrency with Route 27. It then continues east, crossing the Garden State Parkway between Exits 127 and 129 in Woodbridge, following concurrencies with Route 184 and Route 440 to the southern section's eastern terminus at the Outerbridge Crossing.

=== Hudson County (Kennedy Boulevard) ===
The northern section of CR 501 begins in Hudson County, New Jersey and is known as Kennedy Boulevard. It starts at the intersection of Route 440/Bayonne Bridge in Bayonne, making its way north to Route 63 in North Bergen. The highway crosses over Route 139 to the Holland Tunnel and Route 495 to the Lincoln Tunnel.

At its intersection of Route 63 in North Bergen, CR 501 begins a concurrency with Route 63 into Bergen County, while Kennedy Boulevard loops around the northern end of the county and heads south through Guttenberg, West New York and Weehawken, where it is known as Boulevard East.

Major points on Kennedy Boulevard include Marist High School, New Jersey City University, Saint Dominic Academy, Saint Peter's University, Journal Square, Union City High School, North Bergen High School, and four Hudson County parks: Stephen R. Gregg (Bayonne) Park and Mercer Park in Bayonne, Lincoln Park in Jersey City and James J. Braddock (North Hudson) Park in North Bergen.

Immediately northeast of Journal Square, CR 501 crosses over PATH railroad tracks on an open-spandrel concrete arch bridge completed in 1926. The bridge is a pared-down version of a more ambitious elevated plaza scheme proposed by consulting engineer Abraham Burton Cohen. Cohen's office constructed a model using slot cars to demonstrate traffic flow through the plaza.

The boulevard continues north through Jersey City Heights, passing Dr. Leonard J. Gordon Park. In the area once known as Transfer Station, it enters North Hudson.

=== Bergen County ===
In Bergen County, CR 501 leaves its concurrency with Route 63 in Palisades Park, using Central Boulevard to connect to the concurrency with US 1/9/46 and Route 93. It is then concurrent with Route 93 until it reaches that route's northern terminus at the interchange with Route 4 in Englewood. CR 501 continues north from this interchange through Rockleigh, crossing the New York State Line and becoming NY 340.

== History ==
In 1808, the Perth Amboy Turnpike was legislated to run from Perth Amboy to Bound Brook. The company struggled to complete their road, having petitioned in 1820 to the state legislature to extend the time to complete the road. They were unsuccessful, as the road was only completed as far as Piscataway.

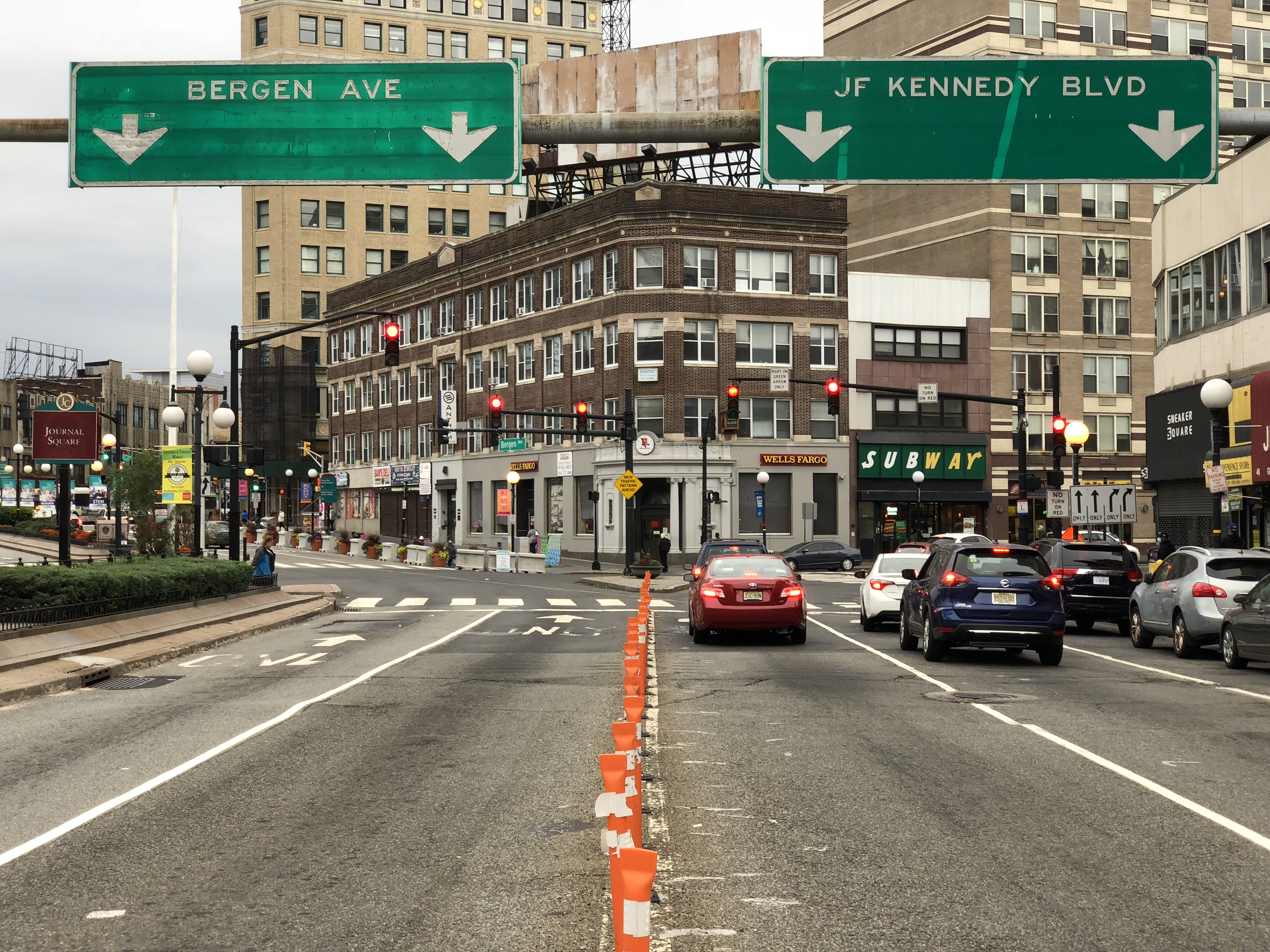
CR 501 (JFK Boulevard) southbound at Bergen Avenue in Jersey City

Prior to being renamed in honor of John F. Kennedy in the 1960s, Kennedy Boulevard was known as Hudson Boulevard. While there was discussion of building a county long road as early as the 1870s, parts of Hudson County Boulevard were officially opened in 1896. By 1913 it was completed, and considered to be fine for "motoring", and included the road's eastern section, Boulevard East, into which Kennedy Boulevard forks at 91st Street. (The fork that continues north merges with Bergen Boulevard.) Taken as a single road, the circuitous route of west and east sections of the entire boulevard runs from the southern tip of the county at Bergen Point to its northern border with Bergen County and south again to the Hoboken city line.

The Boulevard was named the fifth most dangerous road for pedestrians in New Jersey, and the most dangerous road in Hudson County for pedestrians in a February 2011 report by the non-profit Tri-State Transportation Campaign. The road was the location of six pedestrian fatalities between 2007 and 2009, which account for a little more than a fifth of Hudson County's 29 pedestrian deaths in the three-year period. In November 2017 county officials launched a safety campaign for Kennedy Boulevard's five most dangerous intersections, based on accident data:

- 25th Street in Bayonne
- Lexington Avenue in Jersey City
- 36th Street in Union City
- 51st Street in West New York
- 91st Street in North Bergen

County officials had expressed interest in building a pedestrian bridge that crosses Kennedy Boulevard at 32nd Street, at the Union City-North Bergen border since at least. The two cities contracted a company to build the bridge for just over $4 million in November 2010. Construction plans began in May 2011, and field work began later that August.

== Major intersections ==
County	Location	mi	km	Destinations	Notes
Middlesex	South Plainfield	0.0	0.0	CR 529 (Stelton Road)	Western terminus
Middlesex	Edison	2.0	3.2	I-287 north	Exit 3 (I-287)
Middlesex	Metuchen	3.3	5.3	Route 27 north (Middlesex Avenue) – Rahway	Western end of the concurrency with Route 27
Middlesex	Metuchen	3.6	5.8	Route 27 south (Lake Avenue) to I-95 Toll / N.J. Turnpike – Highland Park	Eastern end of the concurrency with Route 27
Middlesex	Metuchen	3.8	6.1	CR 531 (Main Street)	
Middlesex	Edison	4.6	7.4	US 1 to I-95 Toll / N.J. Turnpike – Newark, New Brunswick	Interchange
Middlesex	Edison	5.7	9.2	CR 514 (Woodbridge Avenue) to I-95 Toll / N.J. Turnpike	
Middlesex	Edison	6.2	10.0	CR 616 east (New Brunswick Avenue)	Western terminus of CR 616
Middlesex	Woodbridge Township	6.9	11.1	Route 184 begins	
Middlesex	Woodbridge Township	7.1	11.4	To I-95 Toll / N.J. Turnpike / G.S. Parkway north	Partial cloverleaf interchange
Middlesex	Woodbridge Township	7.3	11.7	US 9 – Rahway, South Amboy	Partial cloverleaf interchange
Middlesex	Perth Amboy	7.7	12.4	CR 655 (Florida Grove Road)	
Middlesex	Perth Amboy	8.2	13.2	Route 35 CR 653 (Amboy Avenue) Route 184 ends	Eastern terminus of Route 184
Middlesex	Perth Amboy	8.2	13.2	Western end of the freeway section	
Middlesex	Perth Amboy	8.2	13.2	Route 440 south to I-95 Toll / N.J. Turnpike / G.S. Parkway south / US 9 south	Western end of the concurrency with Route 440
Middlesex	Perth Amboy	8.3	13.4	Route 35 south	Westbound exit only
Middlesex	Perth Amboy	8.6	13.8	Amboy Avenue	Eastbound exit is via Route 440 exit; access via CR 653
Middlesex	Perth Amboy	9.2	14.8	State Street / High Street – Perth Amboy	Eastbound exit and westbound entrance; access via CR 611; last eastbound exit before toll
Arthur Kill		10.1	16.3	Outerbridge Crossing (eastbound toll on Staten Island)	
Arthur Kill		10.1	16.3	NY 440 north – Staten Island Route 440 ends	Continuation into New York Northern terminus of Route 440
Connection made via NY 440 (12.7 mi or 20.44 km)
Kill van Kull		22.85	36.77	NY 440 south – Staten Island Route 440 begins	Continuation into New York; southern terminus of Route 440
Kill van Kull		22.85	36.77	Bayonne Bridge (southbound toll on Staten Island)	
Hudson	Bayonne	23.7	38.1	Avenue A	Southbound exit and entrance; last southbound exit before toll
Hudson	Bayonne	23.7	38.1	Route 440 north to I-78 Toll / Newark Bay Extension – Jersey City	Northern end of the concurrency with Route 440
Hudson	Bayonne	23.7	38.1	Northern end of the freeway section	
Hudson	Bayonne	27.1	43.6	To Route 440	Access via West 63rd Street
Hudson	Jersey City	29.3	47.2	CR 612 (Communipaw Avenue)	
Hudson	Jersey City	31.1	50.1	US 1-9 (Tonnele Circle)	
Hudson	Jersey City	31.1	50.1	Route 139 east – Holland Tunnel, Lincoln Tunnel	Western terminus of the upper level of Route 139
Hudson	North Bergen	34.0	54.7	Route 495 to I-95 Toll / N.J. Turnpike – Lincoln Tunnel	Interchange; former I-495
Hudson	Union City	34.3	55.2	CR 505 north (38th Street)	Southern terminus of CR 505
Hudson	North Bergen	37.2	59.9	Route 63 begins	
Bergen	Fort Lee	39.1	62.9	Route 5 – Ridgefield, Edgewater	Access via Bergen Boulevard
Bergen	Palisades Park	39.6	63.7	Route 63 north – George Washington Bridge	Northern end of the concurrency with Route 63
Bergen	Palisades Park	39.9	64.2	US 1-9 / US 46	Interchange; access via 5th/6th Streets
Bergen	Palisades Park	40.5	65.2	Route 93 south (Grand Avenue) – Ridgefield, Fairview	Southern end of the concurrency with Route 93
Bergen	Englewood	42.7	68.7	Route 4 – New York, Paterson	Interchange
Bergen	Englewood	42.8	68.9	CR 501 south (Van Nostrand Avenue) Route 93 ends	Northern terminus of Route 93; one-way pair begins
Bergen	Englewood	43.8	70.5	CR 505 (Palisades Avenue) – Teaneck, Bergenfield	
Bergen	Englewood	45.0	72.4	CR 501 south (Hudson Avenue)	Northern terminus of one-way pair
Bergen	Closter	49.6	79.8	CR 502 (Old Closter Dock Road) to US 9W – Westwood, Alpine	
Bergen	Rockleigh	53.0	85.3	NY 340 north – Sparkill	Continuation into New York
1.000 mi = 1.609 km; 1.000 km = 0.621 mi: Concurrency terminus; Electronic toll collection; Incomplete access
