= New Jersey Route 7 =

State highway in northern New Jersey, US

Route 7
- Two segments of Route 7 highlighted in red

Route information
- Maintained by NJDOT, Township of Nutley, and Passaic County
- Length: 9.46 mi (15.22 km)
- Existed: 1927–present

Southern segment
- Length: 5.35 mi (8.61 km)
- East end: US 1-9 Truck in Jersey City
- Major intersections: CR 508 in Kearny; Route 17 in North Arlington
- West end: CR 506 in Belleville

Northern segment
- Length: 4.11 mi (6.61 km)
- South end: CR 667 at the Newark–Belleville line
- North end: Kingsland Road in Nutley–Clifton line

Location
- Country: United States
- State: New Jersey
- Counties: Hudson, Bergen, Essex, Passaic

Highway system
- New Jersey State Highway Routes; Interstate; US; State; Scenic Byways
← Route 6	→ Route 8

Route 7 is a state highway in the northern part of New Jersey in the United States. It has two sections, an east–west alignment running from U.S. Route 1/9 Truck in Jersey City to the Passaic River in Belleville, and a north–south alignment running from the Newark/Belleville to the Nutley/Clifton border. The New Jersey Department of Transportation (NJDOT) lists Route 7 as a single north–south highway with a small gap between the alignments. The entire highway has a combined length of 9.46 mi (15.22 km).

The southern section of Route 7, which runs from Jersey City west-northwest to Belleville, passes through industrial areas, the New Jersey Meadowlands, Arlington Memorial Park, and some residential and business areas. West of the interchange with County Route 508 in Kearny, Route 7 is the Belleville Turnpike, a historic road created in 1759. The northern section of Route 7 runs north through residential and business areas of Belleville and Nutley into Clifton, where it turns west and crosses back into Nutley, briefly turning to the north to come to its northern terminus. A portion of the route in Nutley is municipally maintained while the portion within Clifton is maintained by Passaic County. The two separate sections of Route 7 are linked by County Route 506 (Rutgers Street) in Belleville, which is signed as Route 7 despite the fact it is not officially part of the route. There is inconsistency between the official NJDOT diagram and what is signed on the road; the signage suggests that Route 7 is really one continuous route that also extends even further north to Route 3 via Kingsland Road and Cathedral Ave, and many navigation systems also indicate this. However, the NJDOT has not updated the definition of Route 7 past a 2-segment highway.

Route 7 was established in 1927 to run from Jersey City to Paterson, replacing pre-1927 Route 11 between Belleville and Paterson. The routing was amended in 1929 to head to Route 3 in Wallington and was extended north to Route 6 (now U.S. Route 46) in East Paterson in 1949. In 1953, the route was modified to follow its current alignment.

== Route description ==
=== Southern segment ===
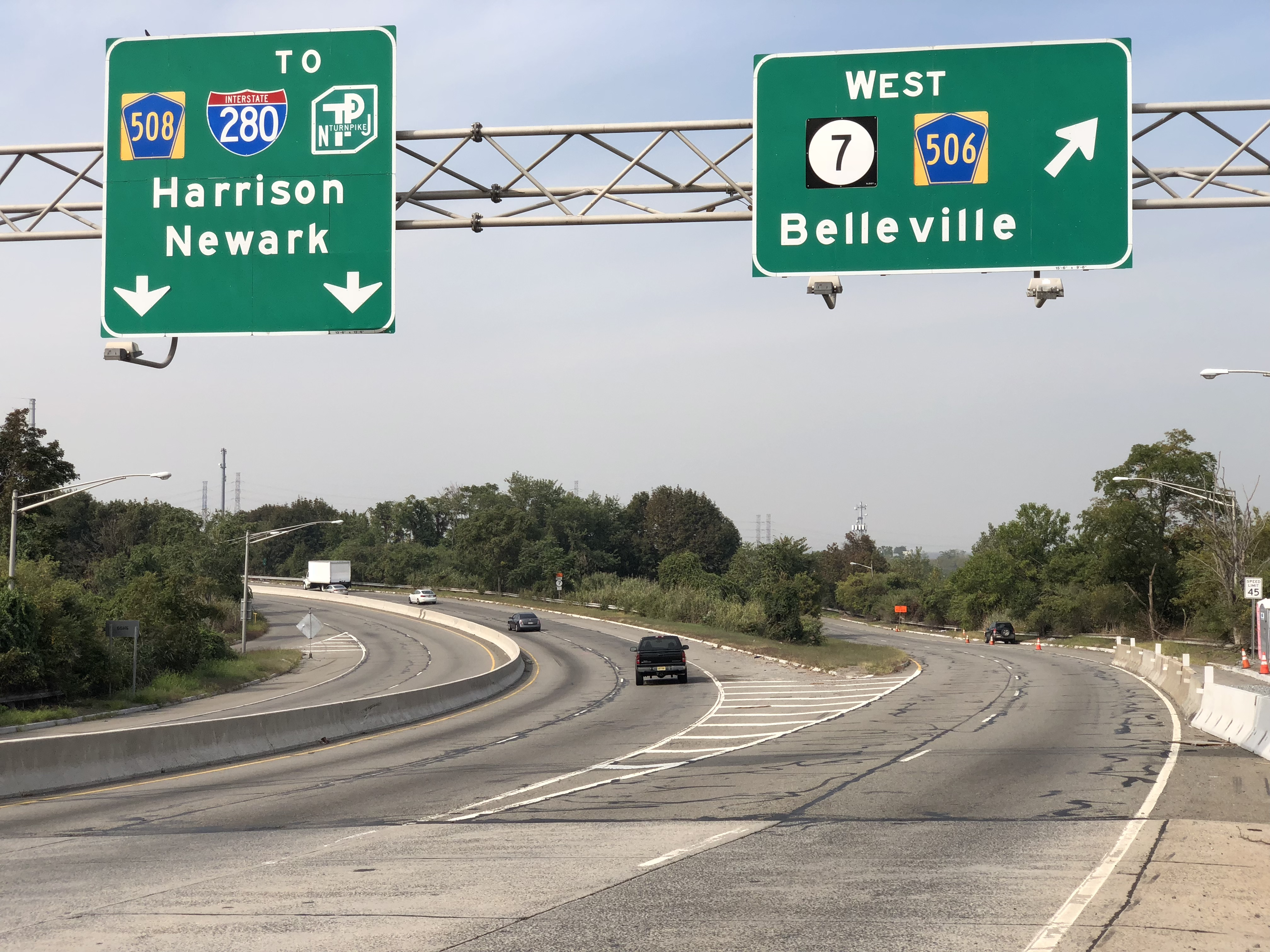
Route 7 westbound at the eastern terminus of CR 508 in Kearny

The first segment of Route 7 begins at an intersection with U.S. Route 1-9 Truck and County Route 645 (Charlotte Avenue) in Jersey City, Hudson County, heading to the west on a four-lane highway that is signed east–west. The route crosses the Hackensack River on the Wittpenn Bridge parallel to Conrail Shared Assets Operations' Passaic and Harsimus Line into Kearny. Route 7 interchanges with County Route 659 (Fish House Road) and widens to a six-lane divided highway. The route then passes by industrial areas and a Conrail Shared Assets Operations railroad yard before it passes over NJ Transit's Morris & Essex Lines and reaches an interchange with County Route 508. Past this interchange, Route 7 becomes the four-lane, divided Belleville Turnpike, with the eastern end of the Newark Turnpike running in the division between the two sides of Route 7. It then becomes an undivided two-lane road, heading northwest, narrowing to two lanes before it crosses under Amtrak's Northeast Corridor and passes through the New Jersey Meadowlands. The route crosses under the Eastern Spur of the New Jersey Turnpike (Interstate 95) and then the Western Spur of the turnpike a short distance later before passing over Norfolk Southern's Boonton Line.

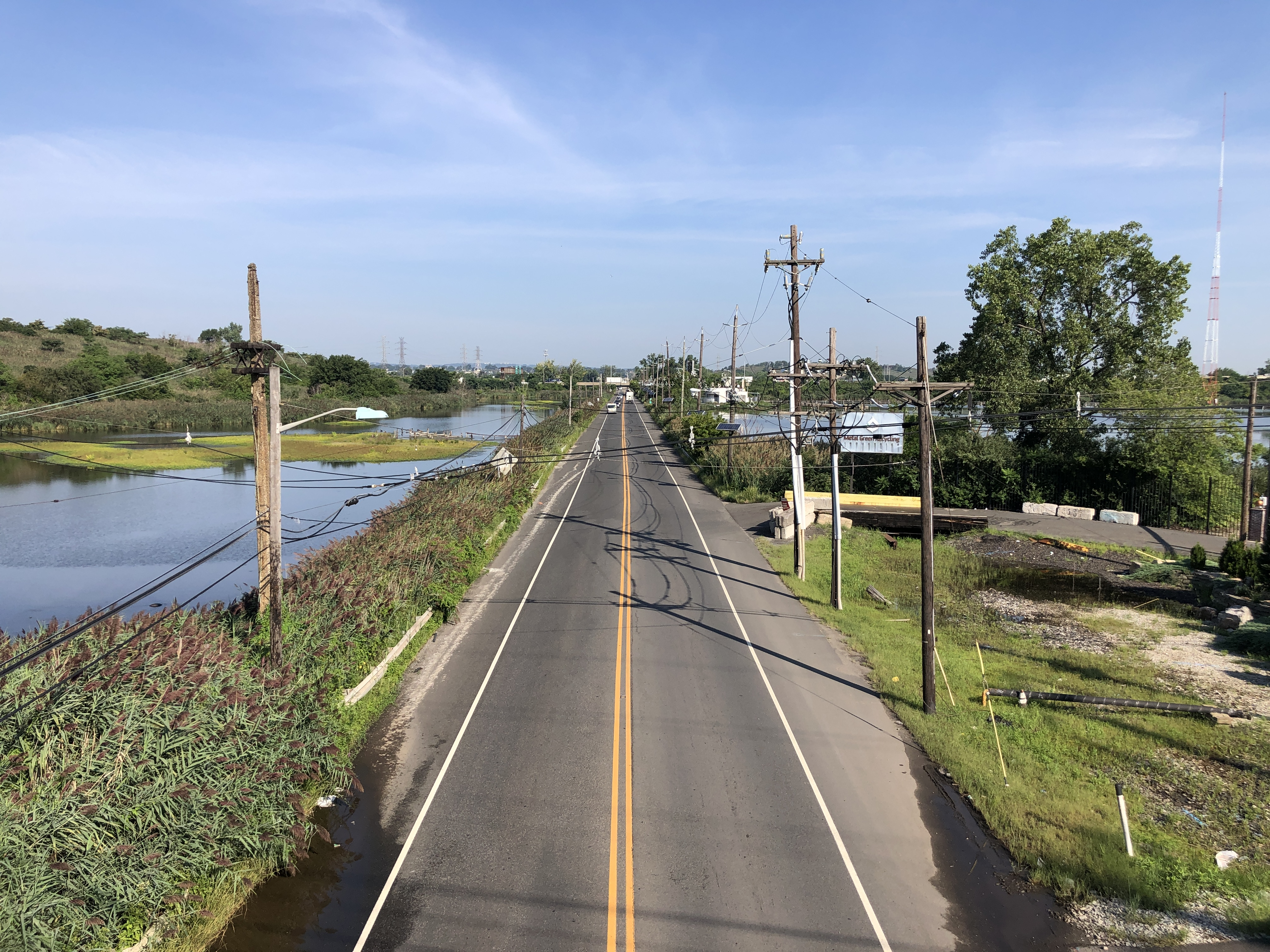
View west along Route 7 in Kearny

Route 7 continues northwest, widens, with a painted median, as it passes through two large cemeteries on the border of Hudson County (Kearny) to the south and Bergen County (North Arlington) to the north, though the route itself is signed north–south along that border.

After an intersection with Schuyler Avenue (which runs as County Route 507 to the south of Route 7 and County Route 130 to the north of Route 7), the road turns NNW, narrowing again to two lanes undivided. In this portion of the route, it had a concurrency with County Route 507 (both Bergen and Hudson counties). It keeps this configuration for about a half mile, as it still runs along the Kearny/North Arlington border. At that point, it meets the southern terminus of Route 17 (Ridge Road) and the northern terminus of County Route 697 (Kearny Avenue).

Past this intersection, County Route 507 turns away from Route 7, becoming concurrent with Route 17. by heading north on River Road, while Route 7 continues along Belleville Turnpike for another half mile, Route 7 continues another half mile west, crossing the Passaic River on a lift bridge, known as the Belleville Turnpike Bridge or Rutgers Street Bridge, into Belleville, Essex County, where the local street name changes from Belleville Turnpike to Rutgers Street. The first section of Route 7 ends underneath the Route 21 freeway, where it continues as County Route 506.

=== Gap in the route ===
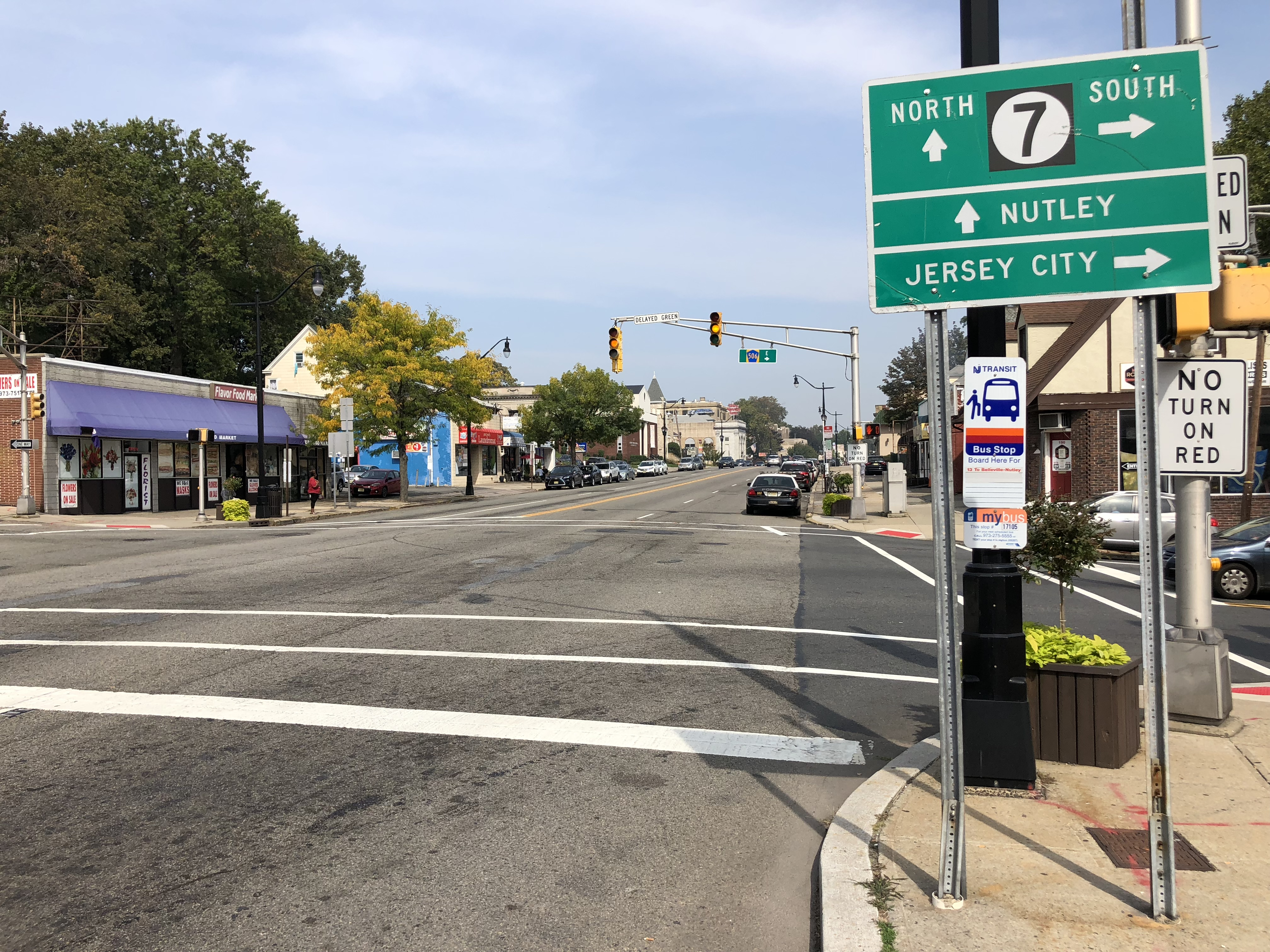
Route 7 (Washington Avenue) at CR 506 (Rutgers Street) in Belleville. Note that Route 7 is signed to follow Rutgers Street to the right

The intersection of Main St and Rutgers Street in Belleville forms the end of one section of Route 7 (signed north, directionally west). Rutgers Street is named for Colonel Henry Rutgers, an American Revolutionary War hero and benefactor of what is now Rutgers University. For its entire length, Rutgers carries County Route 506, which ends, like Rutgers Street itself, at the Rutgers Street Bridge.

Prior to turning onto Rutgers Street, CR-506 runs along Washington Street concurrent with the northern section of Route 7. Though the northern section of Route 7 begins a few blocks south, it is not readily recognized (minimal signing). As CR-506 runs concurrently with it here, and then turns down Rutgers for the short distance that bridges the gap between the two Route 7 sections, Rutgers/506 is often viewed as if it continues Route 7, while the short portion of the northern section that lies south of Rutgers is sometimes seen as a spur, even though it is part of the main route.

Rutgers' identity has become so closely aligned with Route 7, that though it is not officially part of Route 7, Rutgers, from Washington Avenue to Main Street, is signed as if it is part of Route 7.

=== Northern section ===
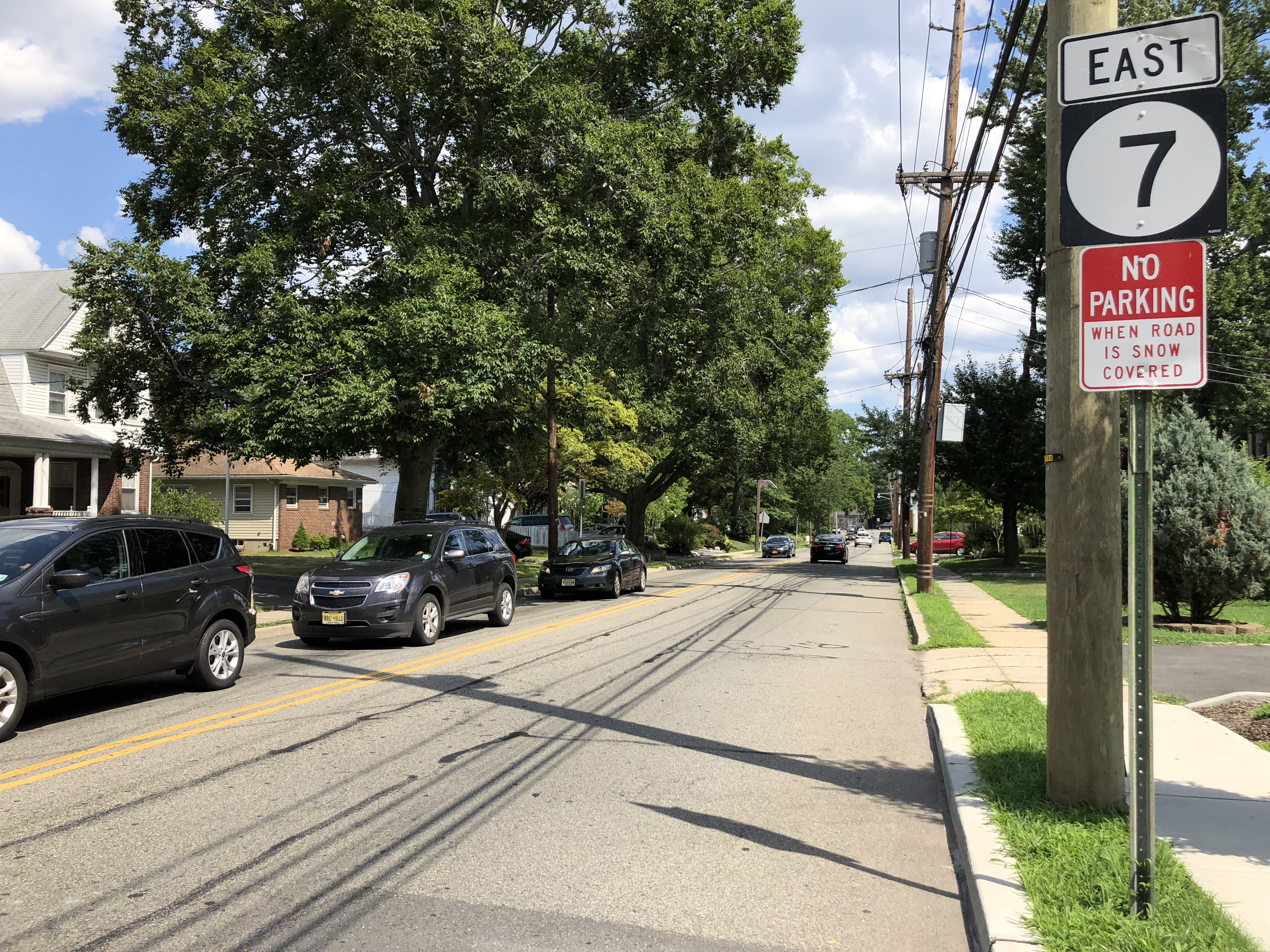
Route 7 eastbound through Nutley

The second section of Route 7, designated a north–south road, heads north on Washington Avenue from the Second River crossing on the Newark/Belleville border, passing through a business district. The route intersects County Route 506 (Belleville Avenue), and that county route then forms a concurrency with Route 7 along the next block of Washington Avenue, to the intersection with Rutgers Street. At that point, County Route 506 heads to the east, ending at the intersection of Main Street, Rutgers Street, and bridge to Belleville (which is also the other section of Route 7).

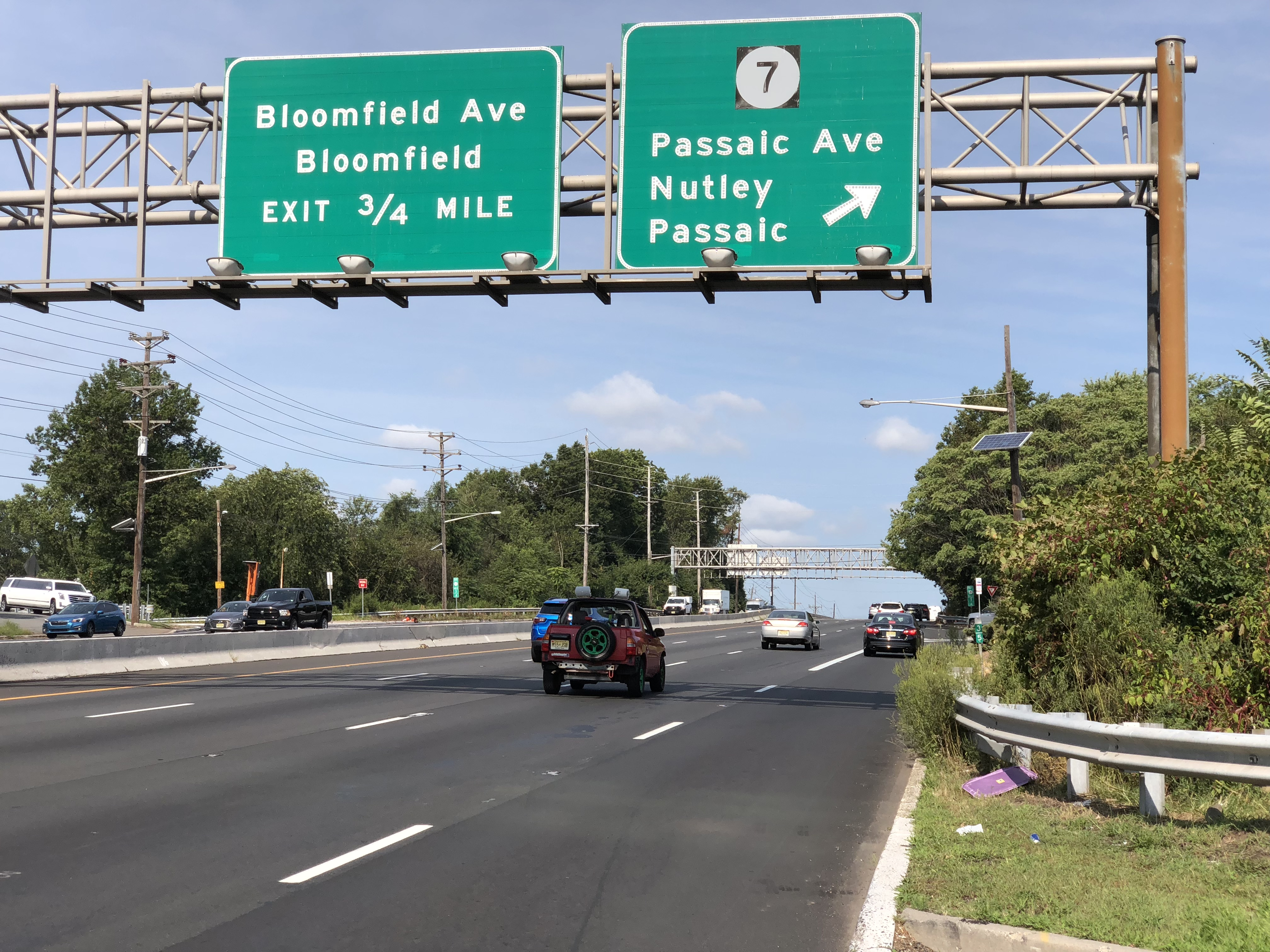
Signage for Route 7 on Route 3 in Clifton

Route 7 is not signed on Washington Avenue between the Second River bridge and Rutgers Street, except on some overhead signs suspended from traffic signals.

From the Rutgers Street intersection, Route 7 continues along Washington Avenue for about a mile and a half before reaching Nutley, still continuing on Washington Avenue into Nutley. The road crosses Norfolk Southern's Newark Industrial Track line at an intersection with County Route 648 (Centre Street). At the intersection with County Route 646 (Park Avenue), Route 7 turns into a municipally maintained road and enters a more residential area. Upon intersecting County Route 606 (Kingsland Road), Route 7 crosses into Clifton, Passaic County and heads to the west on county-maintained Kingsland Street signed east–west. Kingsland, carrying Route 7, crosses back into Nutley, regaining state maintenance. When Kingsland becomes County Route 644 at the intersection with Cathedral Avenue, Route 7 turns north from Kingsland onto Cathedral Avenue and comes to its terminus at Orange Street in Nutley. However, signage continues to indicate Route 7 up to the terminus of Cathedral Avenue at interchange with Route 3 at the intersection of Cathedral Avenue, Passaic Avenue, and Ward Avenue. Per NJDOT traffic regulations, the portion of Cathedral Avenue and Passaic Avenue within the vicinity of the Route 3 interchange in Clifton is under state jurisdiction.

== History ==
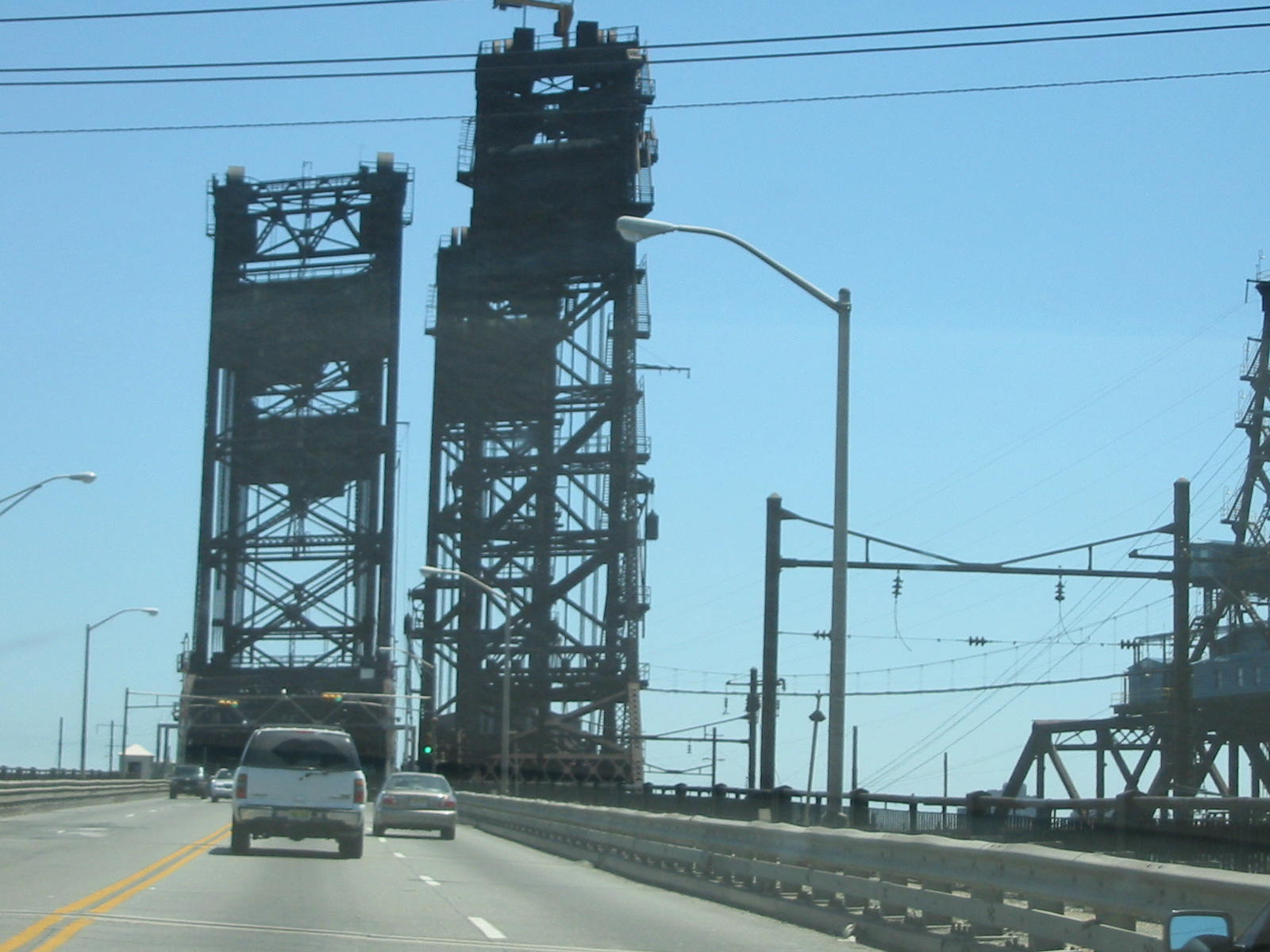
Route 7 crosses the Hackensack River on the Wittpenn Bridge

The Belleville Turnpike, which is the majority of the southern portion of Route 7, was created in 1759 as a turnpike made out of cedar logs. This road was chartered in 1808. It served as a part of the Underground Railroad route for escaped slaves to get to Jersey City. The road west of modern County Route 508 was later incorporated into the William Penn Highway, which ran from Jersey City to Pittsburgh, PA. The northern segment of Route 7 was originally a part of pre-1927 Route 11, which was legislated in 1917 to run from Newark to Paterson. In the 1927 New Jersey state highway renumbering, Route 7 was designated to run from Jersey City to Paterson, replacing pre-1927 Route 11 between Belleville and Paterson.

Route 11N

In 1929, the routing was amended to run from Route 25 (now U.S. Route 1/9 Truck) in Jersey City to Route 3 in Wallington. Route 7 was extended north in 1949 to continue to Route 6 (now U.S. Route 46) in East Paterson (now Elmwood Park). In the 1953 New Jersey state highway renumbering, Route 7 was legislated onto its current alignment, with the northern terminus moved to the Nutley/Clifton border. The route was also realigned to head south on Washington Avenue between the Newark border and Rutgers Street in Belleville on what was Route 11N, a remnant of pre-1927 Route 11, making Route 7 discontinuous. County Route 506 used to follow the southern portion of Route 7 but has been truncated to the intersection with Routes 7 and 21 in Belleville.

== Major intersections ==
County	Location	mi	km	Destinations	Notes
Hudson	Jersey City	0.00	0.00	US 1-9 Truck (Newark Avenue) to US 1-9 north / Route 139 east – Lincoln Tunnel, Holland Tunnel, Secaucus, Hoboken, Jersey City, Bayonne	Eastern terminus
Hudson	Hackensack River	0.42	0.68	Wittpenn Bridge	
Hudson	Kearny	0.56	0.90	CR 659 west (Fish House Road)	Interchange; eastern terminus of CR 659
Hudson	Kearny	1.40	2.25	CR 508 west (Harrison Street) to I-95 Toll / N.J. Turnpike / I-280 – Harrison, Newark	Interchange; eastern terminus of CR 508
Hudson–Bergen county line	Kearny–North Arlington line	4.22	6.79	CR 507 south (Schuyler Avenue)	Eastern end of CR 507 concurrency
Hudson–Bergen county line	Kearny–North Arlington line	4.74	7.63	Route 17 north (Ridge Road) – Rutherford, Suffern	Southern terminus of Route 17
Hudson–Bergen county line	Kearny–North Arlington line	5.22	8.40	CR 507 north (River Road) to Route 17 – Lyndhurst, Wallington, Garfield	Western end of CR 507 concurrency
Passaic River		5.32	8.56	Belleville Turnpike Bridge	
Essex	Belleville	5.35	8.61	CR 506 west	Continuation west
Essex	Gap in route				
Essex	Newark–Belleville line	6.05	9.74	Broadway (CR 667 south)	Continuation south
Essex	Belleville	6.40	10.30	CR 506 west (Belleville Avenue) – Bloomfield	Southern end of CR 506 concurrency
Essex	Belleville	6.48	10.43	CR 506 east (Rutgers Street) – Jersey City	Northern end of CR 506 concurrency
Essex	Nutley–Clifton line	10.16	16.35	Kingsland Road	
1.000 mi = 1.609 km; 1.000 km = 0.621 mi: Concurrency terminus
