= New Jersey Route 25 =

Former state highway in New Jersey, United States

Route 25
- Approximate routing of Route 25 c. 1952

Route information
- Maintained by NJDOT
- Existed: 1927–1953

Major junctions
- South end: US 30 at Benjamin Franklin Bridge in Camden
- US 30 / US 130 / Route 43 / Route 45 in Pennsauken Township; Route S41 in Palmyra; US 206 / Route 39 in Bordentown; Route 33 in Hightstown; US 1 / Route S26 in New Brunswick; US 9 / Route 35 in Woodbridge; Route 4 in Woodbridge Route 28 in Elizabeth; US 22 / Route 29 in Newark; US 1 / US 9 / Route 1 in Jersey City
- North end: Holland Tunnel in Jersey City

Location
- Country: United States
- State: New Jersey
- Counties: Camden, Burlington, Mercer, Middlesex, Union, Essex, Hudson

Highway system
- New Jersey State Highway Routes; Interstate; US; State; Scenic Byways
← Route 24	→ Route 26
- Route 1 Extension
- U.S. National Register of Historic Places
- U.S. Historic district
- New Jersey Register of Historic Places
- Location: US 1/9 between mile post 51.25-54.55, Route 139 mile post 0-1.45; Jersey City, Kearny Point, Newark
- Architect: New Jersey State Highway Commission
- NRHP reference No.: 05000880
- NJRHP No.: 1526

Significant dates
- Added to NRHP: August 12, 2005
- Designated NJRHP: June 13, 2005

Route 25 was a major state highway in New Jersey, United States prior to the 1953 renumbering, running from the Benjamin Franklin Bridge in Camden to the Holland Tunnel in Jersey City. The number was retired in the renumbering, as the whole road was followed by various U.S. Routes: US 30 coming off the bridge in Camden, US 130 from the Camden area north to near New Brunswick, US 1 to Tonnele Circle in Jersey City, and US 1 Business (since renamed Route 139) to the Holland Tunnel.

Route 1 largely became Route 25 in the 1927 renumbering. Route 25 was best known for the 13-mile (21 km) Route 1 Extension, which became the first controlled-access highway or "super-highway" in the United States that also connected the high traffic volume from the Holland Tunnel to the rest of New Jersey (with roads to other state destinations). The Holland Tunnel was the first vehicular connection between New York City and New Jersey, which are separated by the Hudson River.

The Route 1 Extension was built between 1925 and 1932 and was best known for the Pulaski Skyway. The skyway and portions of the currently designated Route 139 have been listed on the federal and NJ state registers of historic places since 2005 as part of a nominated portion of the Route 1 Extension.

== History ==
=== Routes 1 and 2: 1916-1927 ===
In 1916, two routes were defined by the state legislature:

- Route 1, from the south border of Elizabeth via Rahway and Metuchen to the north border of New Brunswick, and from the south border of New Brunswick via Hightstown and Robbinsville to the east border of Trenton.
- Route 2, from the south border of Trenton via White Horse, Bordentown and Burlington to the north border of Camden.

Route 1 used the existing Lincoln Highway from Elizabeth to New Brunswick, except for two sections between Rahway and New Brunswick (where the Lincoln Highway largely used the old Essex and Middlesex Turnpike). A new alignment was built on the northwest side of the Pennsylvania Railroad (now Amtrak's Northeast Corridor) in Woodbridge Township and Edison to avoid two grade crossings, and a detour around existing streets was made in Metuchen to avoid another one in favor of a tunnel. This route, including the realignments, was taken over in 1919, except between the south border of Rahway and downtown Metuchen, which was acquired in 1918.

South of New Brunswick, Route 1 used the old New Brunswick and Cranbury Turnpike (Georges Road) to Cranbury and the Bordentown and South Amboy Turnpike to Robbinsville. At Robbinsville, it turned west on Nottingham Way, running to the Trenton line on Greenwood Avenue. This section was all taken over in 1919.

Route 2 left Trenton on Broad Street, known as the White Horse Road, to White Horse. At White Horse it turned south on what was known as the White Horse Road Extension and Trenton Road, intersecting the Bordentown and South Amboy Turnpike northeast of Bordentown. There it turned southwest along the turnpike, named Park Street in Bordentown, continuing on the Florence Road (old Burlington Turnpike) through Florence Township to Burlington. From Burlington, Route 2 kept going southwest on the Westfield and Camden Turnpike, ending at the Camden border at Westfield Avenue. This was also taken over in 1919.

Several amendments in 1922 added to the routes. Route 2 was extended southwest through Camden to the proposed Benjamin Franklin Bridge, and a spur was added from Five Points northwest to the Tacony-Palmyra Ferry. More important was the extension of Route 1 north to the planned Holland Tunnel.

=== Route 1 Extension: 1922-1932 ===
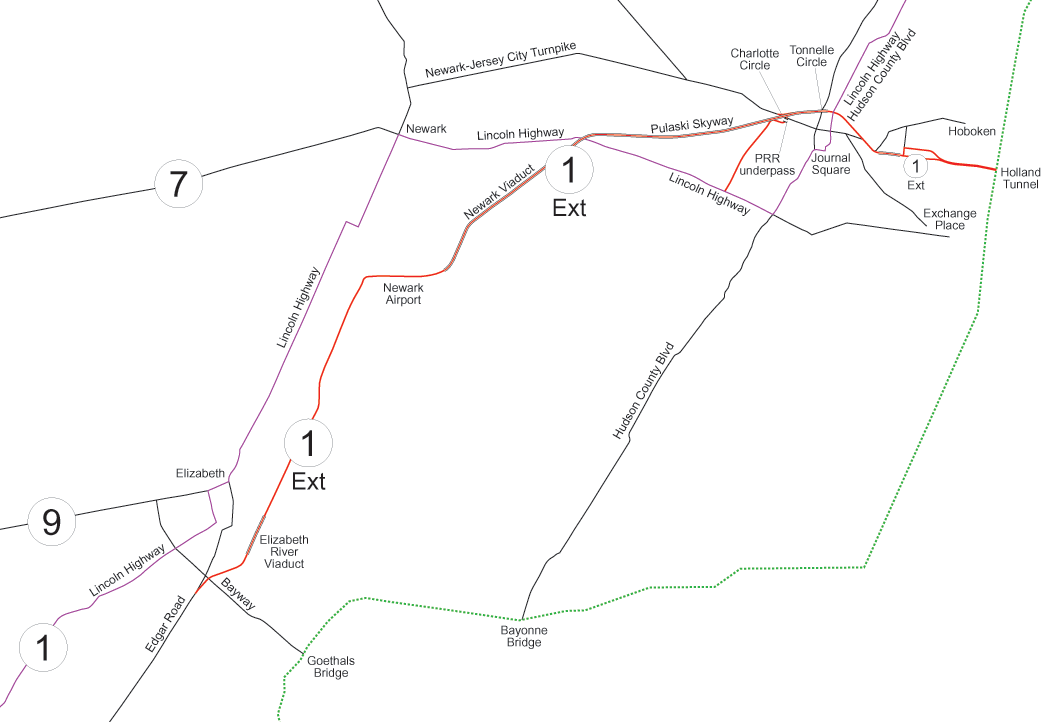
A map of the Route 1 Extension

The 13-mile (21 km) Route 1 Extension is considered to be the first controlled-access highway or "super-highway" in the United States. The highway was built to carry large amounts of traffic from the Holland Tunnel to the rest of New Jersey. The south end of the extension was at Edgar Road in Linden, just south of Elizabeth and the Bayway Circle. Edgar Road had been built as a turnpike in the 19th century, and now serves as part of U.S. Route 1/9 south of the extension.

The road was built from 1925 to 1932. All, but the Pulaski Skyway, was finished by 1930. It was a full freeway, mostly elevated on embankments or viaducts, from four blocks west of the Holland Tunnel to just north of Newark Airport, and a high-speed surface road from there to Elizabeth (and beyond).

In summer of 1923, the NJ State Highway Commission decided that it would be an entirely new route, from the Lincoln Highway (Route 1) southwest of Elizabeth to the Holland Tunnel. Existing roads, which passed through downtown Newark, were already experiencing major congestion. Frederick Lavis, Assistant Construction Engineer of the New Jersey State Highway Department, explained this decision:

The new highway will be the easterly end of the Lincoln Highway and will carry the greater part of the travel between New Jersey coast resorts, and Trenton, Philadelphia and points south of New York. It was to be made part of one of the main through routes from and to New York. It was stated that this route would undoubtedly be used as a main artery of transportation by trucks carrying freight from New Jersey, Pennsylvania and adjacent points to and from New York.
It was reported that the highway will assume many of the characteristics of a railway, except that the rolling stock will be autos and auto trucks. It was pointed out that in order that the maximum amount of traffic could pass, the highway would have to be free from interruption.

It was also decided that the road would have a minimum width of 50 feet (15 m), which would be enough room for five lanes. The center one was intended as a vehicle breakdown lane since there were no shoulders, but was used as a "suicide lane" for passing slower traffic. At the time, it often took two or three hours to go the 15 miles (24 km) from New York City to the far border of Elizabeth, and the new highway would reduce travel time by over an hour. Grades would be at most 3.5%, and roadway curves would have radii of at least 1,000 feet (300 m).

==== Construction ====
As part of the Holland Tunnel project, the New Jersey Interstate Bridge and Tunnel Commission and the New York State Bridge and Tunnel Commission widened the four blocks of 12th and 14th Streets in Jersey City from Jersey Avenue to Provost Street. 12th Street was widened west of Grove Street to 100 feet (30 m), with the remaining block, at the toll plaza, being 160 feet (49 m) wide. 14th Street, and the two blocks of Jersey Avenue carrying westbound traffic to the 12th Street Viaduct, were widened to 100 feet (30 m).

As part of the project, current U.S. Route 1-9 Truck was built under the Pennsylvania Railroad at Charlotte Circle and east to Tonnele Circle. This was bypassed by the Pulaski Skyway, the last part of the route to be built. Prior to its completion, traffic used what is now US 1-9 Truck.

The city of Elizabeth opposed the alignment along Spring Street, preferring the use of Division Street, but lost the argument.

Section	Opening Date
Section 20 - Edgar Road to Jersey Street, including the Elizabeth River Viaduct	September 27, 1930
Jersey Street to North Avenue	used the existing Spring Street
Section 5 - from South Street to Wilson Avenue	December 16, 1928 (new four-lane northbound roadway in 1949)
Section 4 - north of Wilson Avenue	December 16, 1928 (new four-lane northbound roadway in 1949)
Pulaski Skyway	November 24, 1932
The underpass under the Pennsylvania Railroad at Charlotte Circle, now U.S. 1-9 Truck	soon before March 17, 1929
Section 3 - now U.S. Route 1-9 Truck from Charlotte Circle to Tonnelle Circle	December 16, 1928
Section 2 - cut through the Palisades (now Route 139)	December 16, 1928
Section 1 - now Route 139 (New Jersey) 12th Street Viaduct in Jersey City	July 4, 1927 Parallel westbound 14th Street Viaduct on February 13, 1951
Holland Tunnel	November 13, 1927

=== Route 25: 1927-1953 ===
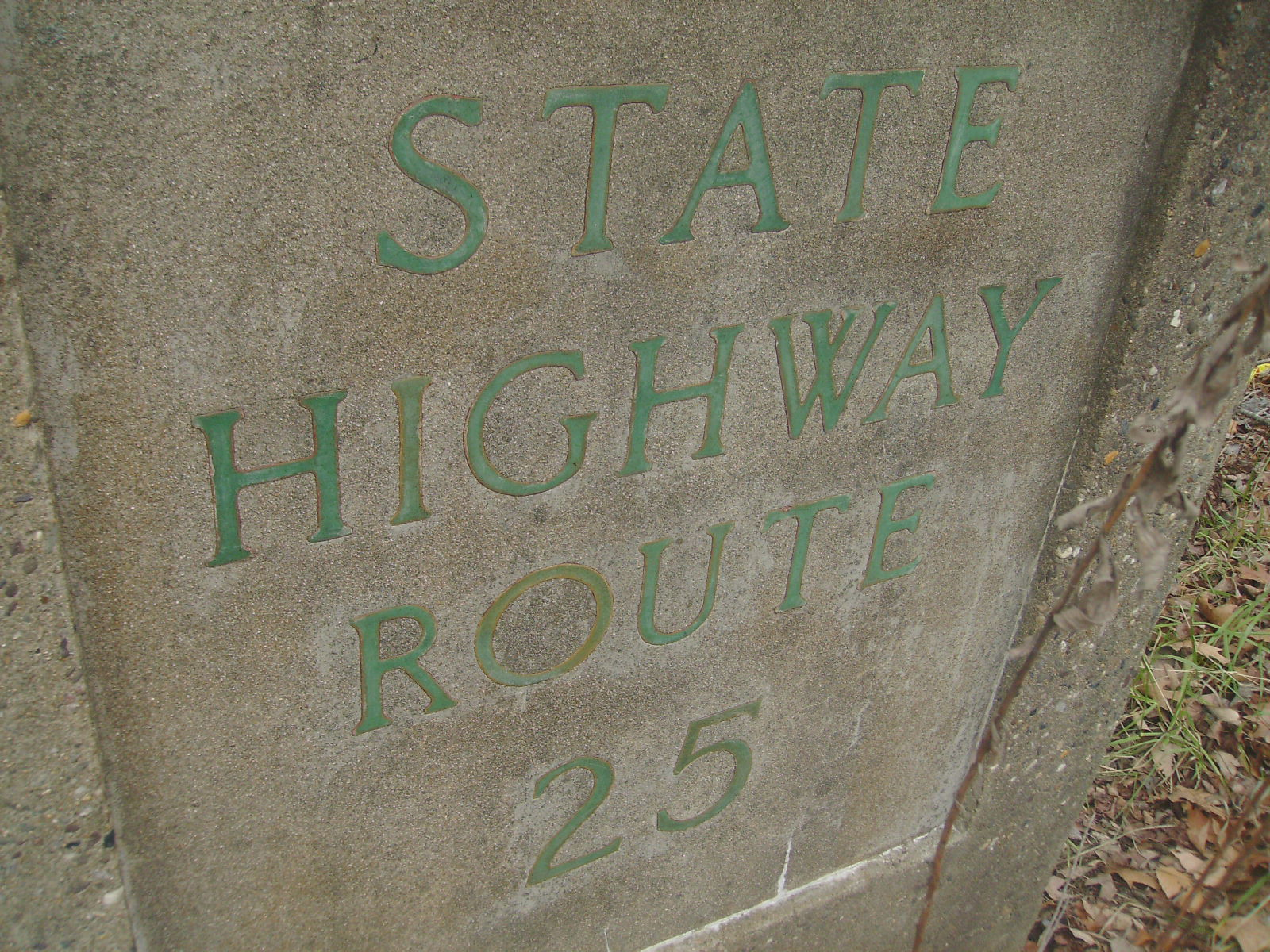
State Highway Route 25 stamp in Mercer County on present-day US 130

Route 1 largely became Route 25 in the 1927 renumbering and Route 1 again in the 1953 highway renumbering in New Jersey.

In the 1927 renumbering, the majority of the Jersey City-Camden corridor, made of Routes 1 and 2, was assigned Route 25. The one major difference was near Trenton; the new Route 25 bypassed Trenton via the old Bordentown and South Amboy Turnpike, cutting from Route 1 at Robbinsville southwest to Route 2 at Bordentown. Route 1 west from Robbinsville to Trenton became part of Route 33, and Route 2 became part of Route 37 from Trenton to White Horse and Route 39 from White Horse to Bordentown. Additionally, the former Route 1 between Elizabeth and New Brunswick became part of Route 27; a new alignment was planned from Elizabeth to south of New Brunswick, running east of the existing road and connecting directly with the Route 1 Extension. The short spur to the Tacony-Palmyra Ferry became Route S41N.

Also in 1927, U.S. Route 1 was assigned to Route 25 north of the New Brunswick area (temporarily signed along Route 27 until Route 25 was finished) and U.S. Route 130 was assigned south to Camden.

North of New Brunswick, the new 50-foot (15 m) wide alignment was completed September 27, 1930; the last part to open was the reconstruction of Edgar Road through Linden, held up by a grade crossing elimination with the Baltimore and New York Railway. The part of old Route 1 to the south border of New Brunswick became Route 25M. The Pulaski Skyway opened in 1932. Sources disagree about whether the old route (U.S. Route 1-9 Truck) became another Route 25M, Route 25T, or an un-suffixed section of 25. (The eastern half of the old road was part of post-1927 New Jersey Route 1.)

The embankment in Newark was doubled in 1949 with a new four-lane northbound roadway.

The Port of New York Authority, which superseded the two state tunnel commissions and took over authority for the Holland Tunnel, built the 14th Street Viaduct in order to avoid the turns to and from Jersey Avenue, but turned over authority over the viaduct to the New Jersey State Highway Commission. The four-lane, westbound 1,800-foot (550 m) viaduct, which was connected to the 12th Street Viaduct, was opened on February 13, 1951.

Many bypasses were built south of New Brunswick:

- Burlington, (as Route 2), (ca. 1925)
- Pennsauken Township to Airport Circle east of Camden, (ca. 1927)
- Bordentown, (ca. 1928)
- Completed from Airport Circle west to the Benjamin Franklin Bridge, (now U.S. Route 30), (ca. 1929)
- Hightstown and Cranbury, (ca. 1937)
- South Brunswick Township, (ca. 1942)
- Yardville, (the old road became Route 156), (ca. 1952)

In the 1953 renumbering, the whole route was decommissioned in favor of the U.S. Routes that were signed along it - US 30, US 130, US 1 and US 1 Business.

== Major intersections ==
County	Location	mi	km	Destinations	Notes
Camden	Camden			Benjamin Franklin Bridge	Southern terminus, south end of US 30 overlap
Camden	Camden			Route 151 west (Flanders Avenue)	
Camden	Pennsauken Township			US 30 east / US 130 south / Route 43 east / Route 45 south (Crescent Boulevard) Route 38 east / Route 40 east	Airport Circle, north end of US 30 overlap, south end of US 130 overlap
Camden	Pennsauken Township			Route S41	
Burlington	Cinnaminson Township			Route S41N north (Cinnaminson Avenue)	
Burlington	Burlington			Route S25 west	
Burlington	Bordentown Township			US 206 south / Route 39 south	South end of US 206/Route 39 overlap
Burlington	Bordentown Township			US 206 north / Route 39 north	North end of US 206/Route 39 overlap
Mercer	Washington Township			Route 33 west	South end of Route 33 overlap
Mercer	East Windsor Township			Route 33 east (Mercer Street)	North end of Route 33 overlap
Middlesex	North Brunswick Township			US 1 south / Route S26 south US 130 north / Route 25M north	North end of US 130 overlap, south end of US 1 overlap
Middlesex	New Brunswick			Route S28	
Middlesex	Woodbridge Township			G.S. Parkway	Interchange
Middlesex	Woodbridge Township			US 9 south / Route 35 south	South end of US 9 overlap
Middlesex	Woodbridge Township			Route 4	Interchange
Union	Elizabeth			Route 28 (South Elmora Avenue/Bayway Avenue)	
Essex	Newark			US 22 west / Route 29 south Route 21 north	Interchange
Essex	Newark			Route 25B north (Port Street)	Airport Circle
Essex	Newark			N.J. Turnpike	NJTP exit 14
Essex	Newark			Route 25T north	Interchange
Hudson	Jersey City			US 1 north / US 9 north / Route 1	Tonnele Circle, north end of US 1/US 9 overlap
Hudson	Jersey City			Holland Tunnel	Northern terminus
1.000 mi = 1.609 km; 1.000 km = 0.621 mi: Concurrency terminus

== See also ==
- Route 25A, a spur from Jersey City west into Newark
- Route 25AD, a bridge over the Passaic River between Harrison and Newark
- Route 25B, a spur to Port Newark
- Route 25M, a spur to New Brunswick (part of pre-1927 Route 1)
- Route S25, a spur to the Burlington-Bristol Bridge
- Route 25T, part of the truck route from Newark to Jersey City
