= Saint Peter's Cemetery (Jersey City, New Jersey) =

Cemetery in Jersey City, New Jersey

Coordinates: 40.7417°N 74.0652°W

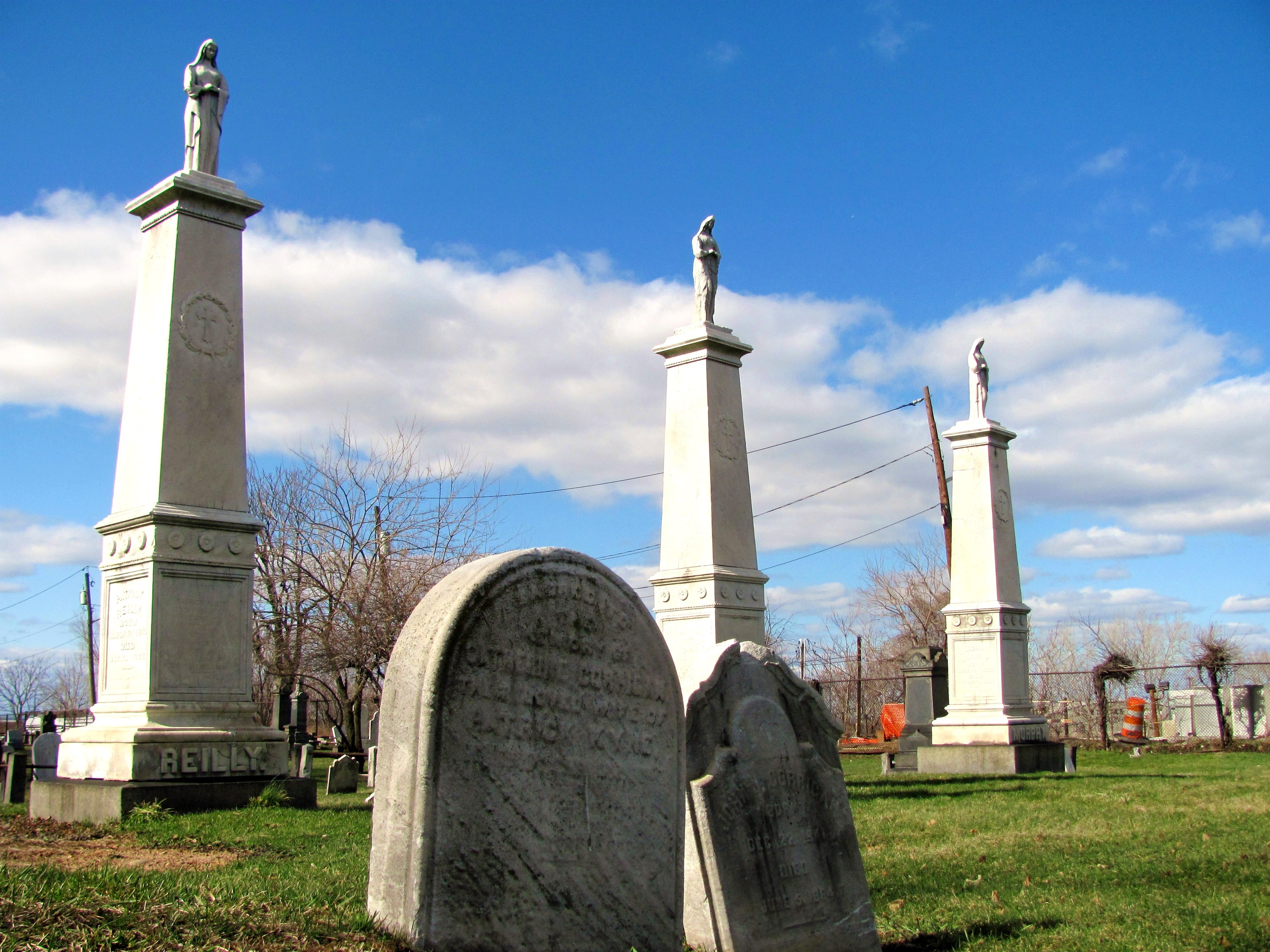
- Near the entrance.
- Interactive map of Saint Peter's Cemetery

Details
- Location: Jersey City, New Jersey
- Country: United States

Saint Peter's Cemetery is located just south of Tonnelle Circle near Croxton Yard in Jersey City, New Jersey and is administered by Holy Name Cemetery.

== See also ==
- Hudson County Cemeteries
