= New Jersey Route 139 =

State highway in Hudson County, New Jersey, US

Route 139
- Route 139 in red, Route 139U in blue

Route information
- Maintained by NJDOT and PANYNJ
- Length: 3.32 mi (5.34 km)
- Existed: 1988–present
- Restrictions: No hazardous goods in Holland Tunnel

Mainline
- Length: 2.49 mi (4.01 km)
- West end: US 1-9 / US 1-9 Truck in Jersey City
- Major intersections: I-78 Toll in Jersey City
- East end: I-78 at the New York state line

Upper level
- Length: 0.83 mi (1,340 m)
- West end: CR 501 in Jersey City
- East end: Route 139 (Mainline) in Jersey City

Location
- Country: United States
- State: New Jersey
- Counties: Hudson

Highway system
- New Jersey State Highway Routes; Interstate; US; State; Scenic Byways
| ← Route 138 | → Route 140 |

Route 139 is a state highway in Jersey City, New Jersey in the United States that heads east from the Pulaski Skyway over Tonnele Circle to the state line with New Jersey and New York in the Holland Tunnel, which is under the Hudson River, to New York City. The western portion of the route is a two-level highway that is charted by the New Jersey Department of Transportation (NJDOT) as two separate roadways: The 1.45-mile (2.33 km) lower roadway (Route 139) between U.S. Route 1/9 (US 1/9) over Tonnele Circle and Interstate 78 (I-78) at Jersey Avenue, and the 0.83-mile (1.34 km) upper roadway (Route 139U or Hoboken Avenue) running from County Route 501 (John F. Kennedy Boulevard) and ending where it joins the lower highway as part of the 12th Street Viaduct, which ends at Jersey Avenue. The lower roadway has been listed on the federal and NJ state registers of historic places since 2005. The eastern 1.32 miles (2.12 km) of the route includes the Holland Tunnel approach that runs concurrent with Interstate 78 on the one-way pair of 12th Street eastbound and 14th Street westbound. Including the concurrency, the total length of Route 139 is 2.77 miles (4.46 km).

What is now Route 139 was originally the northernmost part of the Route 1 Extension. Route 25 replaced Route 1 in the 1927 renumbering. In 1953 renumbering, Route 25 was changed back to U.S. Route 1, which had been previously rerouted to cross the Hudson River when the George Washington Bridge opened in 1931. Route 25 from the Pulaski Skyway over Tonnele Circle to the Holland Tunnel became U.S. Route 1/9 Business. By the 1990s, U.S. Route 1/9 Business was replaced by Route 139.

NJDOT began a rehabilitation program for the lower and upper levels of the highway in 2005. The renovation work for the 12th Street and 14th Street viaducts was completed in 2010. Renovation of the upper roadway, including the Hoboken Avenue Viaduct, and Conrail Viaduct on the lower roadway was expected to be completed by 2016.

== Route description ==
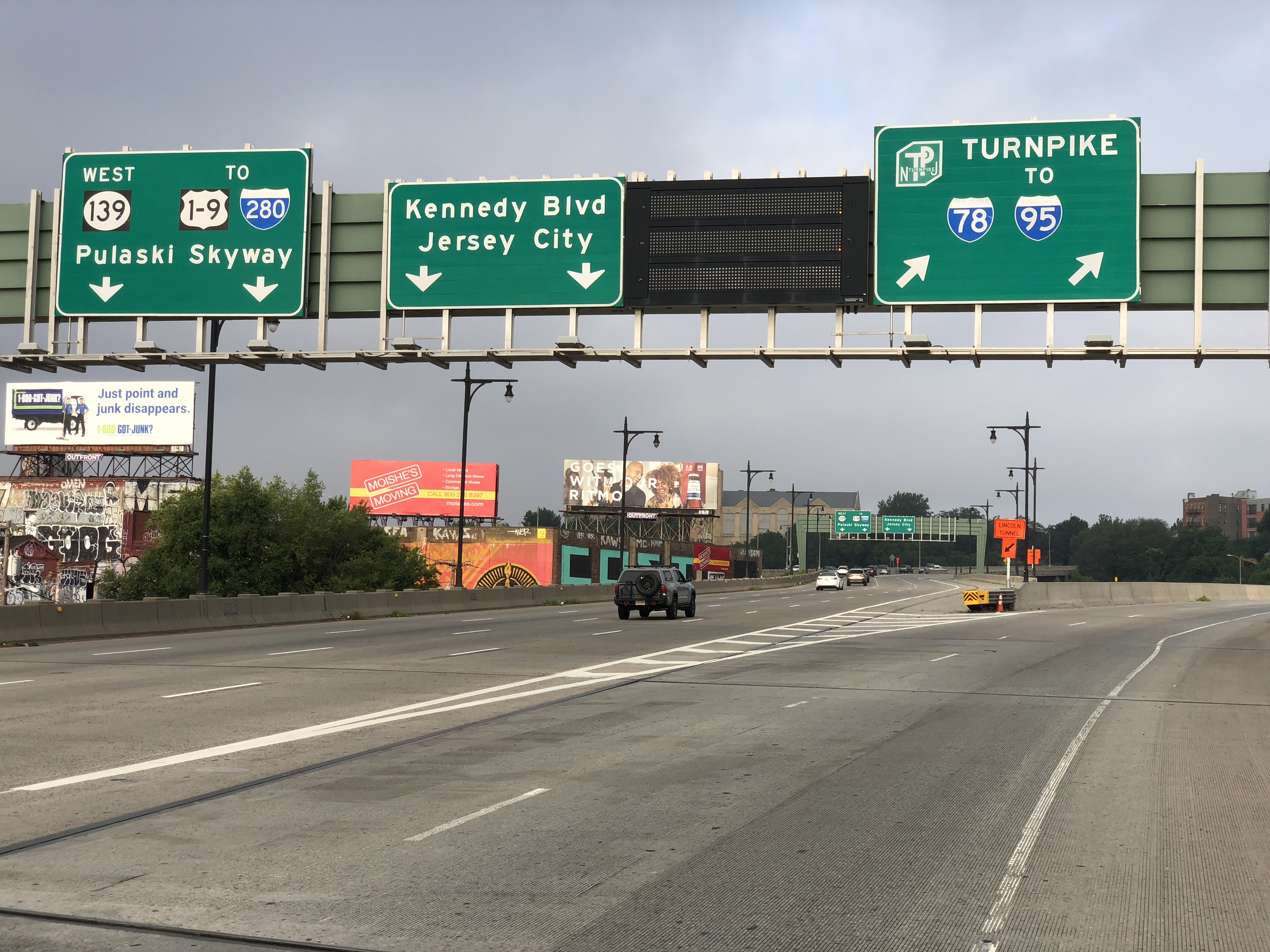
Signage on the 14th Street Viaduct at the western terminus of the concurrency of I-78 and Route 139 in Jersey City

Route 139 is essentially three distinct, but connected highways: the upper level, the lower level, and the Holland Tunnel approach (the Interstate 78 concurrency). NJDOT officially charts the lower and upper levels as independent highways, with the lower level considered Route 139 with a notation that the highway then coincides with I-78, and the upper level considered Route 139U, while not signed as such.

=== Lower level ===
The lower level of Route 139 is a four-lane freeway with its western end at U.S. Route 1/9 a continuation of the Pulaski Skyway over Tonnele Circle. A direct ramp, known as the Tonnele Circle Viaduct, passes over the circle, to connect westbound traffic with southbound U.S. Route 1/9 Truck, which quickly connects to Route 7 that leads to Interstate 280. Northbound U.S. Route 1/9 Truck connects through the circle to eastbound traffic. The skyway soon ends with eastbound and westbound ramps at a cut in Bergen Hill and the four-lane highway passes under John F. Kennedy Boulevard. The road turns to the southeast as Conrail's National Docks Branch and Long Dock Tunnel crosses over the Bergen Arches, an abandoned Erie Railroad right-of-way. The highway then enters an enclosed open cut, running under the upper level of Route 139 as it passes through the Hudson Palisades; this section is known as the Depressed Highway. The covered roadway is naturally ventilated, with wide openings on the south side of the eastbound lanes (facing the parallel Bergen Arches right-of-way to the south), and ventilation bays over the westbound lanes. The road re-emerges under Palisade Avenue and splits into two viaducts, one eastbound and one westbound, which merge with Interstate 78 just west of Jersey Avenue at the Holland Tunnel approach.

=== Upper level ===
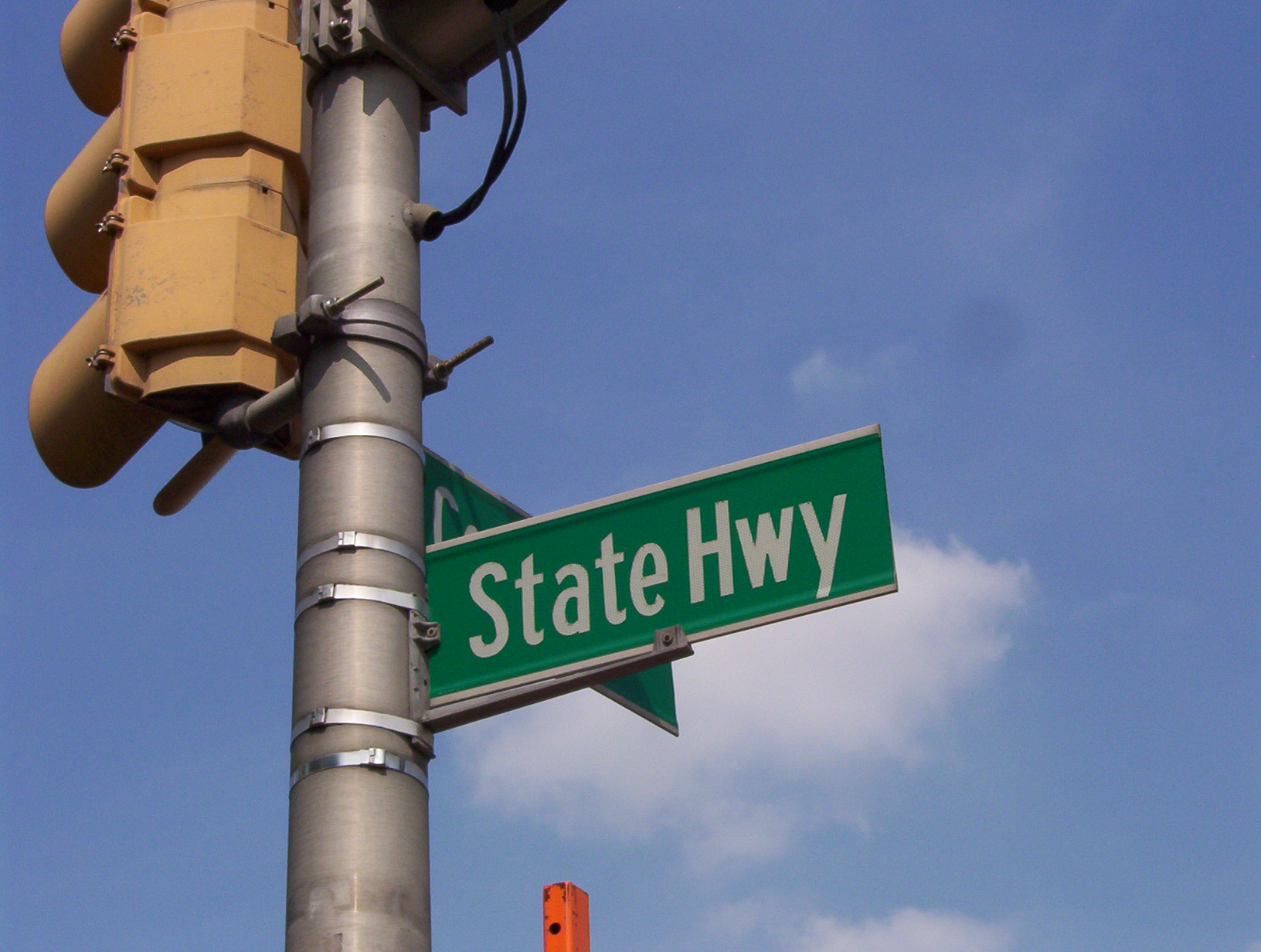
Sign designating the upper level of Route 139 as State Highway

The upper level of Route 139 (also known as State Highway and Hoboken Avenue Viaduct) begins at an intersection with County Route 501 (Kennedy Boulevard), which connects to Bayonne and Union City. The road heads to the southeast through urban residential and commercial areas as a four-lane undivided road, coming to an intersection with Collard Street. Just past this, the route becomes a four-lane divided road, which is separated by ventilation bays from the lower roadway, with the eastbound lanes running above the lower level of Route 139. It continues between the Heights district to the north and the Journal Square district to the south. It crosses several streets, including County Route 646 (St. Pauls Avenue), County Route 617 (Summit Avenue), County Route 663 (Central Avenue), and County Route 644 (Oakland Street). The road meets Concord Street, where there is an eastbound left lane exit and a westbound intersection. After the intersection with Palisade Avenue, the upper level of Route 139 splits and merges with the lower level with a westbound ramp, which has a westbound entrance from the local Hoboken Avenue, and an eastbound ramp.

=== Viaducts ===
The four-lane 12th Street and 14th Street viaducts, completed in 1927 and 1951 respectively, carry Upper Route 139 between Jersey Avenue at Boyle Plaza and the cut into Bergen Hill under Palisade Avenue. Ramps from the western end of 12th Street Viaduct connect to the upper level roadway at the top of Bergen Hill at the Palisade Avenue intersection. Westbound ramp on north side is separated from the main highway by a reinforced concrete retaining wall; the eastbound ramp on south side is supported by reinforced concrete deck arch spans. The western end of 12th Street Viaduct transitions from two-way to one-way, four-lane eastbound traffic just east of the connection with the westbound 14th Street Viaduct. NJDOT undertook a $92 million project to renew the viaducts. The reason for this project was that the viaducts were structurally deficient. The steel beams on the viaducts had deteriorated and the concrete was just extra weight. The project included replacement of the concrete deck, retrofitting for earthquakes, repair of the substructure and superstructure, and construction of a shoulder on westbound 14th Street Viaduct. The rehabilitated viaducts were to also feature ornamental designs to recall the historical significance of the two viaducts. This project was completed in 2010.

=== I-78 concurrency ===
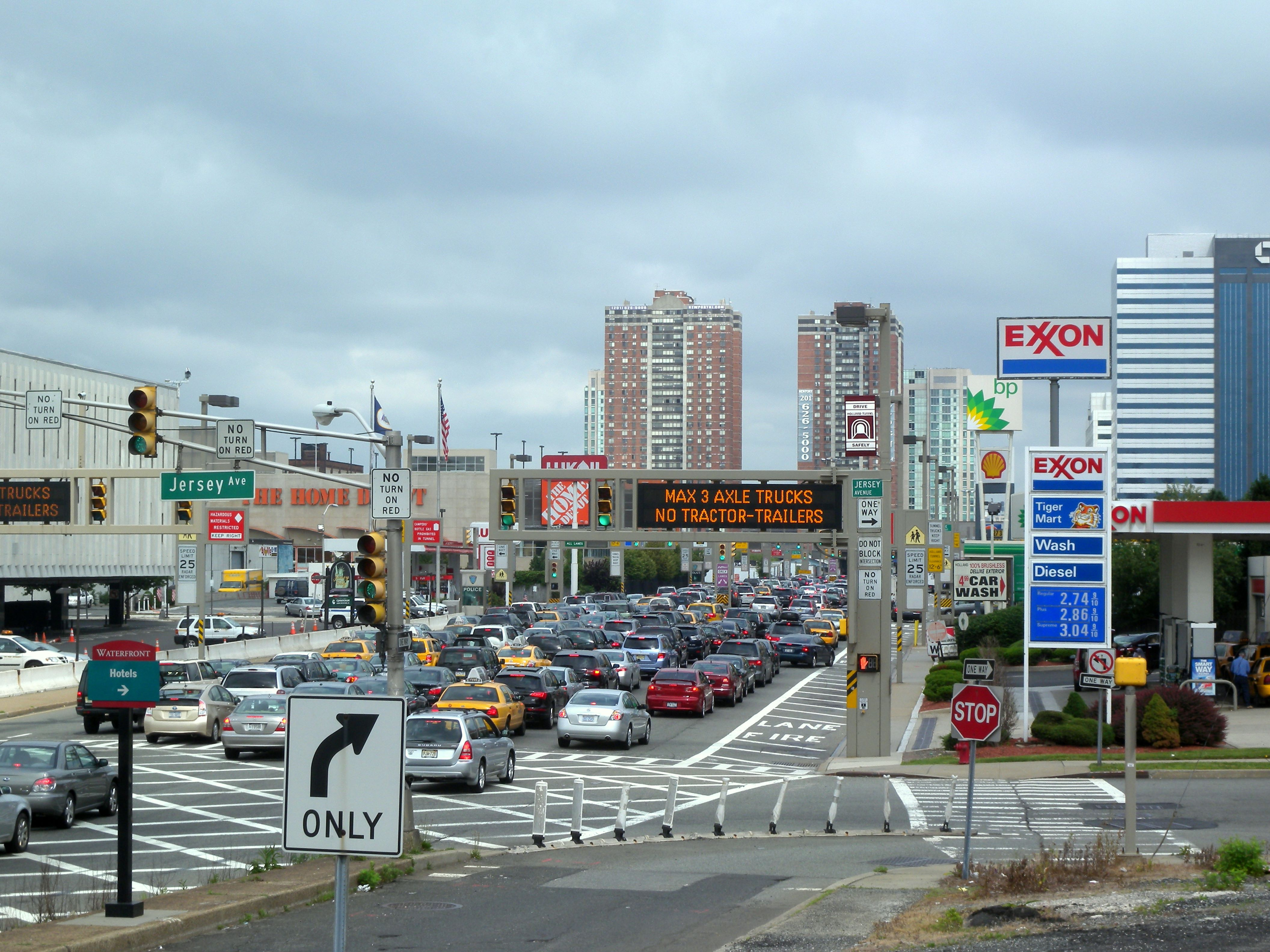
Boyle Plaza just after the merge with eastbound Route 139 and I-78

The elevated westbound Interstate 78 diverges from 14th Street Viaduct of Route 139 one block west of Jersey Avenue. A viaduct for eastbound Interstate 78 runs along south side of eastern section of the 12th Street Viaduct. The highway merges with Route 139 at eastern terminus of 12th Street Viaduct. From here, Route 139 continues east concurrent with that route and passes through business areas as a one-way pair that follows six-lane 12th Street eastbound and six-lane 14th Street westbound. This segment of the route is under the jurisdiction of the Port Authority of New York and New Jersey and this area is also known as Boyle Plaza. The first intersection is with Jersey Avenue, which heads to Downtown Jersey City and Hoboken. It intersects with the one-way northbound County Route 633 (Erie Street) next before crossing one-way southbound County Route 635 (Grove Street). After Grove Street, the road crosses County Route 637 (Luis Muñoz Marín Boulevard) near the Newport Centre Mall just to the south. Past this intersection, the eastbound traffic comes to the former toll plaza for the Holland Tunnel. From here, the concurrency enters the Holland Tunnel under the Hudson River, which carries two lanes in each direction. Route 139 ends at the New Jersey and New York state line within the tunnel and Interstate 78 continues into New York City.

At no point in the I-78 concurrency approaching the Holland Tunnel is the road signed as Route 139. The first time the route is signed westbound is at the split with I-78, and the last time it’s signed eastbound is before it merges with I-78. Even in New York, approaching the tunnel, I-78 is signed with the entrance but Route 139 is not.

== History ==
=== Early years and route numbering ===
- Route 1 Extension
- U.S. Historic district – Contributing property
- New Jersey Register of Historic Places
- Location: NJ Route 139, Jersey City mile post 0-1.45 (excludes 14th St. Viaduct & Pulaski Skyway ramps)
- Part of: Route 1 Extension (ID05000880)
- NJRHP No.: 1526

Significant dates
- Added to NRHP: August 12, 2005
- Designated NJRHP: June 13, 2005

What is now the lower level of Route 139 was originally designated as the northernmost part of Route 1 Extension, which was authorized by the New Jersey Legislature in 1922, a route that was to extend the existing Route 1 from Elizabeth to the Holland Tunnel in Jersey City. When the U.S. Highway System was established in 1926, this road was also designated as part of U.S. Route 1. In the 1927 New Jersey state highway renumbering, this highway became part of Route 25, a route that was to run from the Ben Franklin Bridge in Camden to the Holland Tunnel.

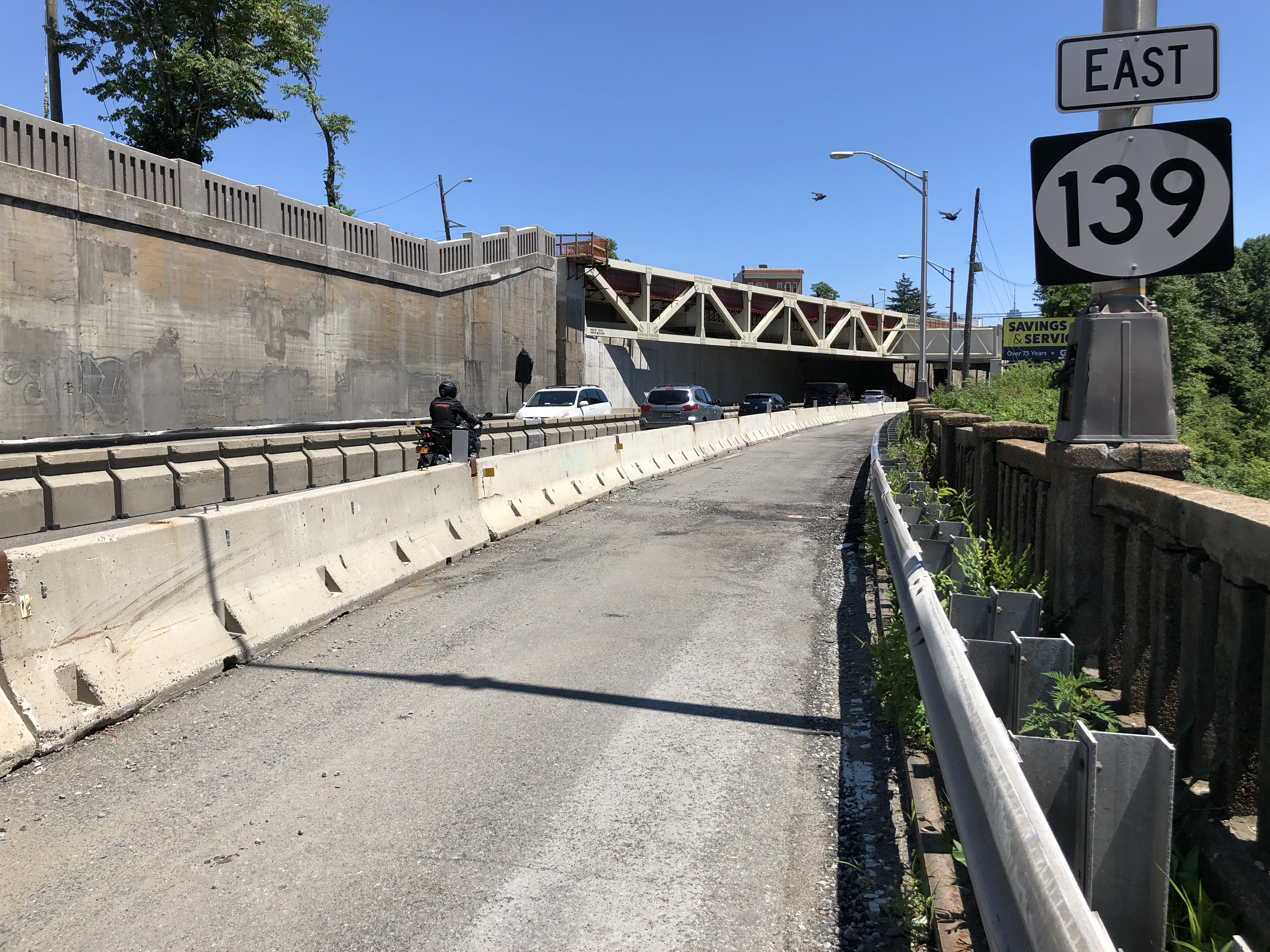
View east along the lower level of Route 139 just after passing under CR 501 (JFK Boulevard) in Jersey City

In the 1953 state highway renumbering, Route 25 designation was changed to U.S. Route 1/9 Business from the Pulaski Skyway over Tonnele Circle to the Holland Tunnel. By the 1990s, U.S. Route 1/9 Business was renumbered to NJ Route 139. Along with the Pulaski Skyway, most of the Route 139 lower level became a contributing property to the Route 1 Extension historic district listed with the state and federal registers of historic places in 2005.

The Newark Bay Extension of the New Jersey Turnpike for Interstate 78 was opened in 1956 to provide access from the New Jersey Turnpike to the Holland Tunnel. Route 139 and I-78 were designated as concurrent where the roads joined at the Holland Tunnel approach near Jersey Avenue all the way to the New York state line in the Holland Tunnel.

=== Holland Tunnel and Pulaski Skyway connections ===
As part of the Holland Tunnel project, the New Jersey Interstate Bridge and Tunnel Commission and the New York State Bridge and Tunnel Commission widened the four blocks of 12th and 14th Streets in Jersey City from Jersey Avenue to Provost Street. 12th Street was widened west of Grove Street to 100 feet (30 m), with the remaining block, at the toll plaza, being 160 feet (49 m) wide. 14th Street, and the two blocks of Jersey Avenue carrying westbound traffic to the 12th Street Viaduct, were widened to 100 feet (30 m).

The two-way, 12th Street Viaduct from Jersey Avenue to the top of Bergen Hill was opened July 4, 1927. The four-lane, westbound, 1,800-foot (550 m), 14th Street Viaduct, which was connected to the 12th Street Viaduct, was opened on February 13, 1951. The Port of New York Authority, which superseded the two state tunnel commissions and took over authority for the Holland Tunnel in 1930, built the 14th Street Viaduct in order to avoid the turns to and from Jersey Avenue, but turned over authority over the viaduct to the New Jersey State Highway Commission. The western end of 12th Street Viaduct was transitioned from two-way traffic to one-way, four-lane, eastbound traffic just east of the connection with the westbound 14th Street Viaduct. It was widened on the southern side between span nos. 1-24 on the eastern end to accommodate the merge in 1956 with the eastbound New Jersey Turnpike extension, I-78.

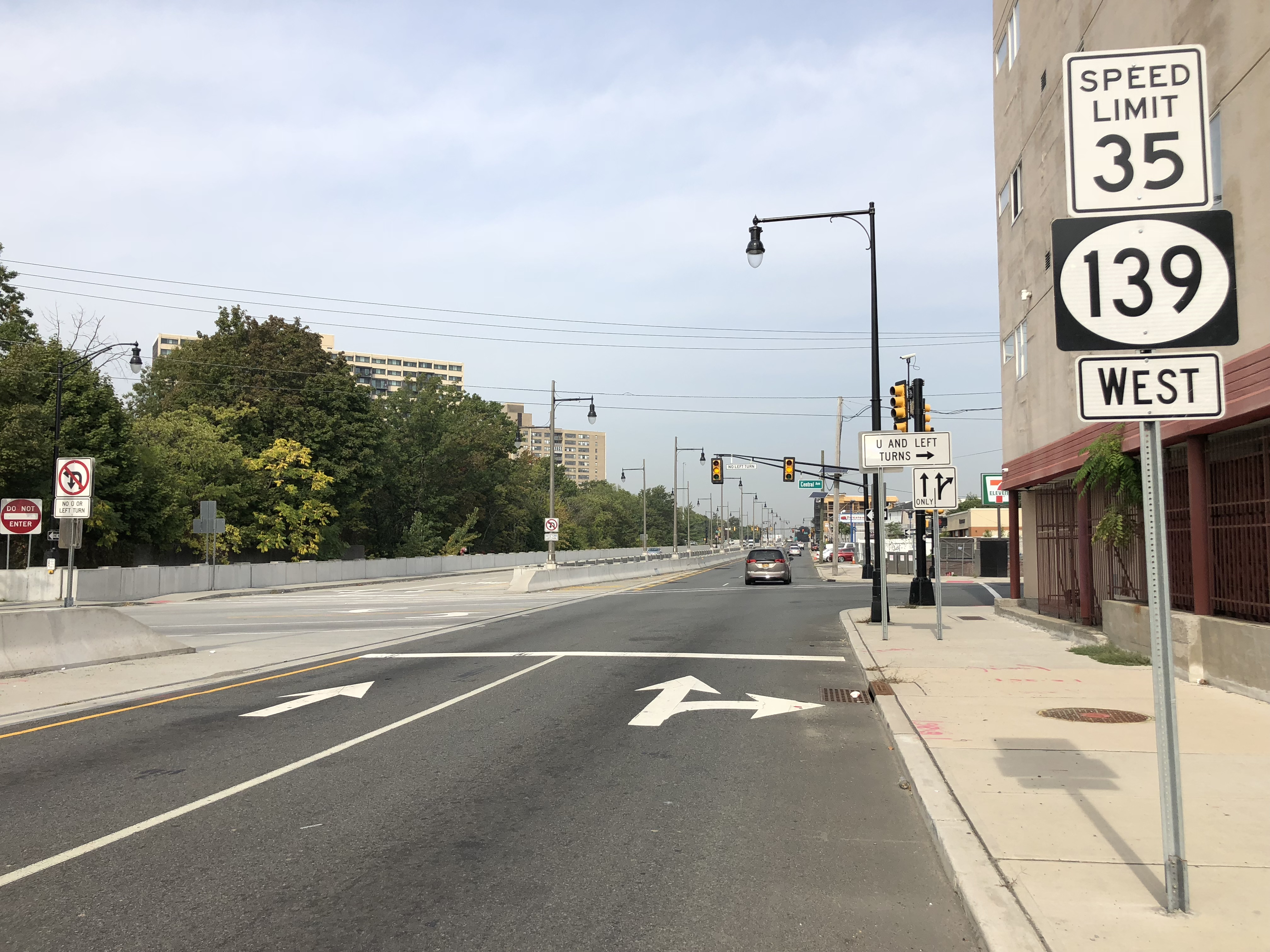
The upper level of Route 139 westbound

In 1928, the completed lower level portion of the highway, along with Route 1 Extension on the eastern side of the Passaic River, was opened as the first part of the eventual high-speed connection between the Holland Tunnel and Newark. The upper level of Route 139 (Hoboken Avenue Viaduct), which provided a multi-lane thoroughfare from Palisades Avenue to John F. Kennedy Boulevard, was also opened.

The high-speed freeway connection was completed with the opening of the Pulaski Skyway in 1932. The Pulaski Skyway ramp at its eastern terminus was eventually replaced with two long outside ramps that were dedicated for eastbound and westbound traffic from the cut in Bergen Hill just west of John F. Kennedy Boulevard. On September 14, 1938, a direct ramp, known as the Tonnele Circle Viaduct, opened over Tonnele Circle to connect westbound traffic with southbound U.S. Route 1/9 Truck, which quickly connects to Route 7 that leads to Interstate 280.

=== Later years ===
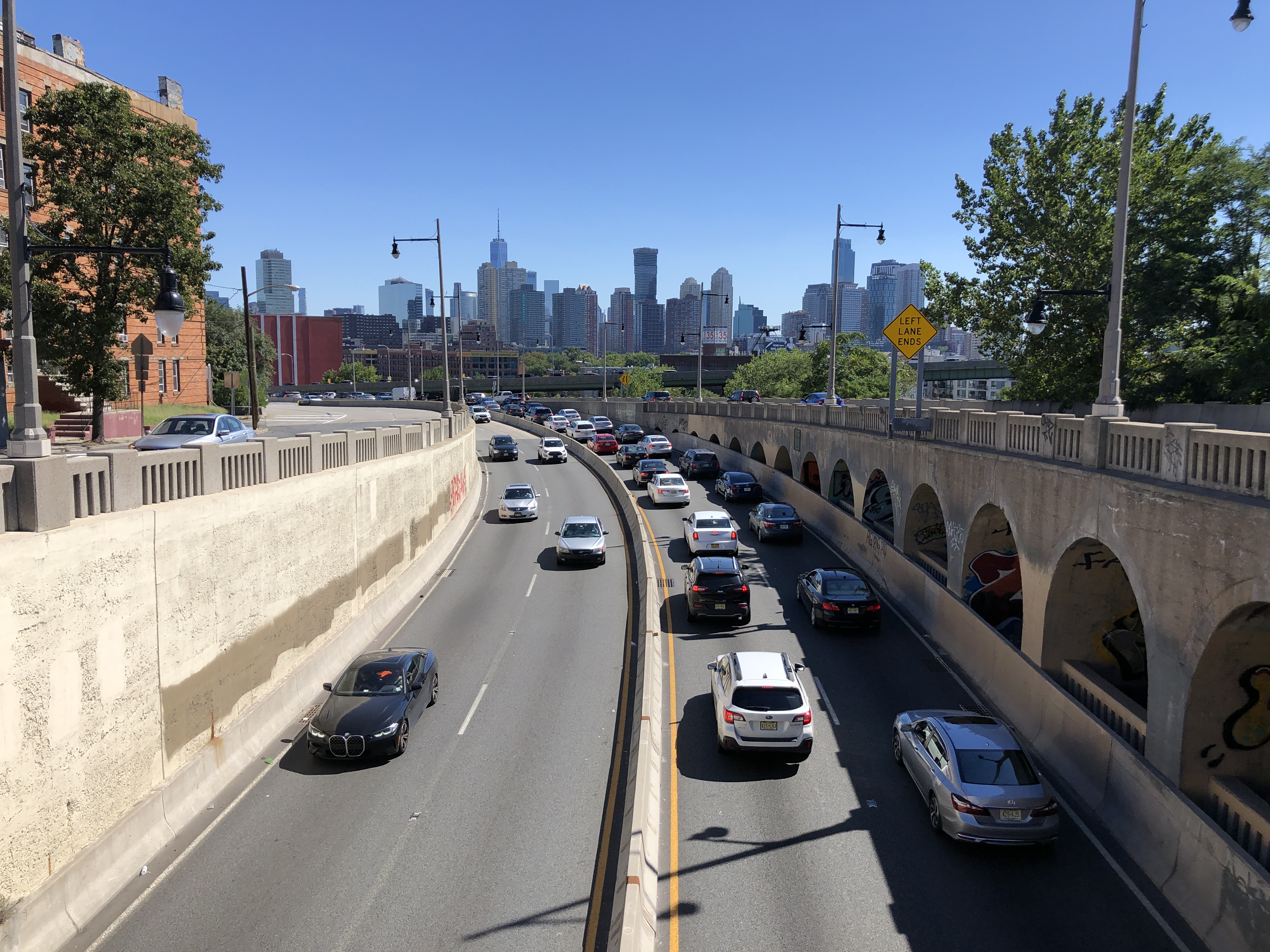
View eastbound along Route 139 from Palisade Avenue, with the Jersey City and Manhattan skylines visible ahead

The Bergen Arches Expressway was proposed in 1989 by Governor Thomas Kean to connect the Jersey City waterfront with a new railroad line, which would provide access to the Meadowlands Sports Complex. This four-lane road was to follow an abandoned railroad line known as the Bergen Arches. This proposed highway was strongly supported by Jersey City Mayor Bret Schundler, who felt that the road could bring further development, as well as provide traffic relief to the four-lane Route 139. In 1998, this project was allocated $26 million in the federal Transportation Equity Act for the 21st Century. Both Jersey City mayor candidates in 2001 supported a transit line instead of a highway along the Bergen Arches. Plans for a highway along the Bergen Arches were dropped in 2002 as leaders of Jersey City, including Mayor Glenn Dale Cunningham, favored mass transit.

In a controversial move in 2011, Governor Chris Christie directed the Port Authority of New York and New Jersey to divert money originally earmarked for the Access to the Region's Core rail project to highway projects. The agency agreed to pay $1.8 billion to partially fund rehabilitation to the Pulaski Skyway and Route 139, and other projects that it considers part of the larger distribution network in the Port of New York and New Jersey.

The Route 139 project rehabilitated the eastbound side of Hoboken Avenue Viaduct and resurfaced the westbound roadway. There were operational improvements at several intersections on the upper roadway, replacing all overpasses. It also replaced the deck and rehabilitated the superstructure of the Conrail Viaduct. The total project cost was estimated at $180–200 million and was expected to be completed by 2016, then later pushed back to 2019. The Pulaski Skyway reopened in mid-2018, and the lower level of Route 139 was temporarily restored to four lanes in December 2018, but was partially closed again in early 2019. Improvements added to Route 139's lower level in 2019 included new lighting and new pavement markings.

The section of 12th Street east of Marin Boulevard, which carries the eastbound I-78 and Route 139 toward the Holland Tunnel in Jersey City, was narrowed from six to four lanes after open road tolling was implemented at the Holland Tunnel. Subsequently, in 2025, the United States Department of Transportation awarded a $25 million grant to the Port Authority of New York and New Jersey to narrow the stretch of 12th Street between Jersey Avenue and Marin Boulevard.

== Major intersections ==
=== Mainline ===
The entire route is in Hudson County.

| Location | mi | km | Destinations | Notes |
|---|---|---|---|---|
| Jersey City | 0.00 | 0.00 | US 1-9 south (Pulaski Skyway) – Newark | Western terminus |
| Jersey City | | | US 1-9 Truck south to I-280 – Newark, Kearny, Bayonne | Westbound exit and eastbound entrance; all trucks must exit |
| Jersey City | | | US 1-9 north (Tonnele Avenue) to Route 495 – Secaucus, Lincoln Tunnel | Westbound exit and eastbound entrance to Tonnele Circle |
| Jersey City | 0.41– 1.00 | 0.66– 1.61 | Tunnel under Hoboken Avenue (Route 139 Lower Level) | |
| Jersey City | 1.13 | 1.82 | To Kennedy Boulevard (CR 501) – Jersey City | Westbound exit and eastbound entrance to Hoboken Avenue (Upper Level) |
| Jersey City | 1.20 | 1.93 | I-78 Toll west to I-95 Toll / N.J. Turnpike | Westbound exit and eastbound entrance; western end of I-78 concurrency |
| Jersey City | 1.45 | 2.33 | Eastern end of freeway section | |
| Jersey City | 1.45 | 2.33 | Jersey Avenue (CR 631) – Lincoln Tunnel | |
| Jersey City | 1.69 | 2.72 | Marin Boulevard (CR 637) | Last eastbound exit before toll |
| Hudson River | 2.49 | 4.01 | Holland Tunnel (eastbound toll; E-ZPass or toll-by-plate) | |
| Hudson River | 2.49 | 4.01 | I-78 east – New York City | Continuation into New York at the river's center; eastern end of I-78 concurrency |
1.000 mi = 1.609 km; 1.000 km = 0.621 mi: Concurrency terminus; Incomplete access; Tolled

=== Hoboken Avenue (Upper Level) ===
The entire route is in Jersey City, Hudson County.

| mi | km | Destinations | Notes |
|---|---|---|---|
| 0.00 | 0.00 | CR 501 (Kennedy Boulevard) to US 1-9 | |
| 0.40 | 0.64 | Central Avenue (CR 663) | |
| 0.78 | 1.26 | Palisade Avenue (CR 654) | No left turns |
| 0.83 | 1.34 | I-78 east / Route 139 east | Hoboken Avenue merges with lower level |
1.000 mi = 1.609 km; 1.000 km = 0.621 mi: Incomplete access

== See also ==
- Route 1A and Route 9A, which once continued US 1-9 Business back to its parents in New York City
