= U.S. Route 1/9 Truck =

Highway in New Jersey

U.S. Route 1/9 Truck
- US 1/9 Truck highlighted in red

Route information
- Auxiliary route of US 1/9
- Maintained by NJDOT
- Length: 4.11 mi (6.61 km)
- Existed: 1953–present

Major junctions
- South end: I-95 Toll / N.J. Turnpike / US 1-9 in Newark
- Route 440 / CR 612 in Jersey City; Route 7 in Jersey City
- North end: US 1-9 / Route 139 in Jersey City

Location
- Country: United States
- State: New Jersey
- Counties: Essex, Hudson

Highway system
- United States Numbered Highway System; List; Special; Divided; New Jersey State Highway Routes; Interstate; US; State; Scenic Byways

U.S. Route 1/9 Truck (US 1/9 Truck) is a United States Numbered Highway in the northern part of New Jersey that stretches 4.11 miles (6.61 km) from the eastern edge of Newark to the Tonnele Circle in Jersey City. It is the alternate route for US 1/9 that trucks must use because they are prohibited from using the Pulaski Skyway, which carries the main routes of US 1/9. It also serves traffic accessing the New Jersey Turnpike, Route 440, and Route 7. The route is a four- to six-lane road its entire length, with portions of it being a divided highway that runs through urban areas. From its south end to about halfway through Kearny, US 1/9 Truck is a freeway, with access to other roads controlled by interchanges.

While the US 1/9 Truck designation was first used in 1953, the roadway comprising the route was originally designated as an extension of Route 1 in 1922, a route that in its full length stretched from Trenton to Jersey City. US 1/9 was designated along the road in 1926, and, one year later, in 1927, this portion of Route 1 was replaced with Route 25 as well as with a portion of Route 1 north of the Communipaw Avenue intersection. Following the opening of the Pulaski Skyway in 1932, US 1/9 and Route 25 were realigned to the new skyway. After trucks were banned from the skyway in 1934, the portion of Route 25 between Newark and Route 1 was designated as Route 25T. In 1953, US 1/9 Truck was designated in favor of Route 25T and Route 1 along this segment of road. The portion of the truck route north of Route 7 was rebuilt as part of a $271.9-million (equivalent to $373 million in 2024) project to construct new approach roads to connect US 1/9 Truck, Route 7, the Pulaski Skyway, Route 139, and US 1/9 north of the Tonnele Circle and local streets in Jersey City. Construction, which started in late 2008, was completed in late 2012.

The highway is posted on reassurance shields as a north–south route. The New Jersey Department of Transportation (NJDOT) Straight Line Diagram, however, lists it as an east–west route and recently updated mileposts depict this alignment, with west direction signed for southbound traffic and east for northbound traffic.

== Route description ==
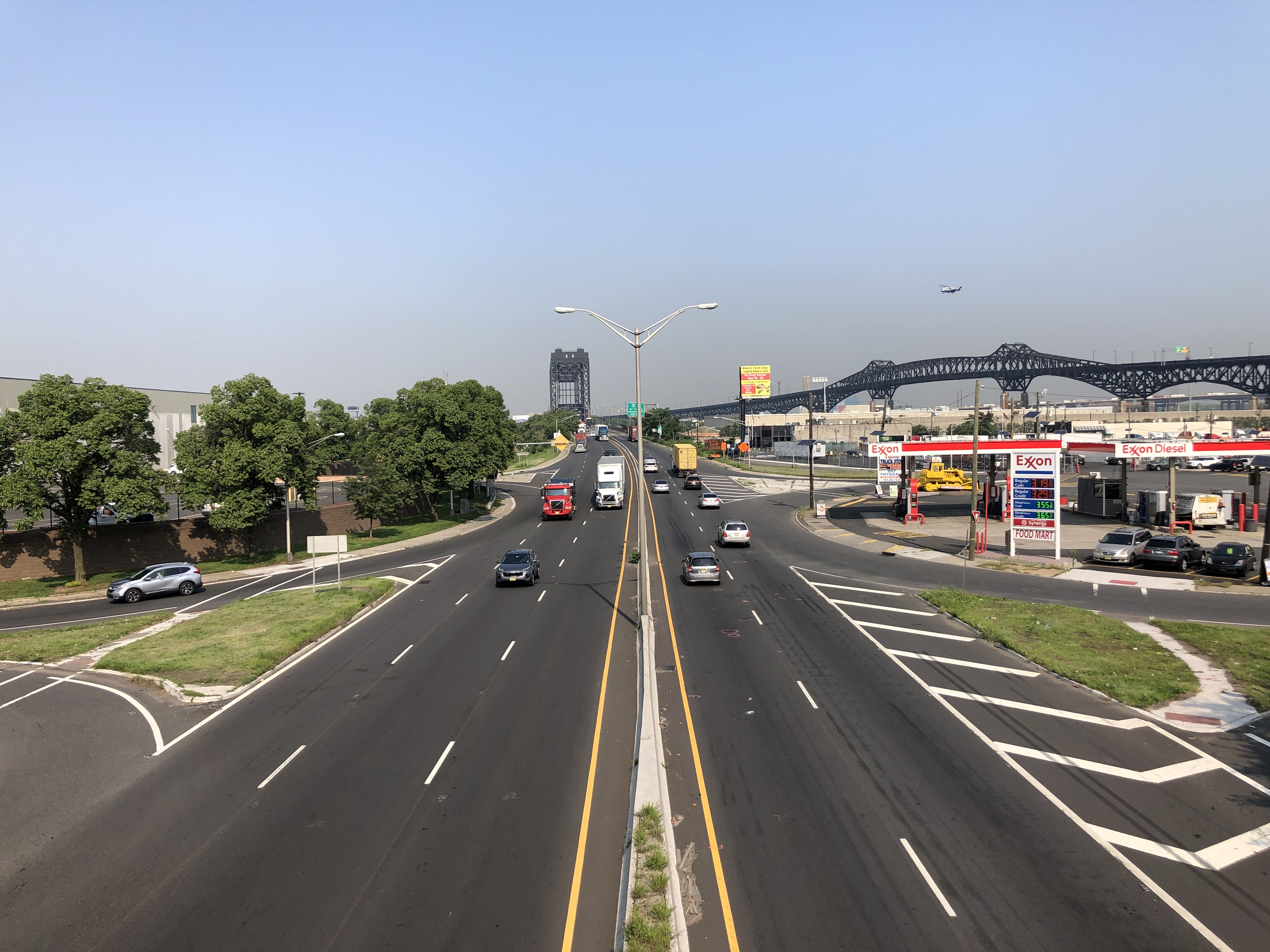
US 1/9 Truck westbound approaching the Passaic River Bridge in Kearny, with the Pulaski Skyway visible to the right

US 1/9 Truck begins at an interchange with access to and from the southbound direction US 1/9, the Pulaski Skyway, in the Ironbound section of the city of Newark in Essex County. The truck route is meant to bypass the portion of US 1/9 along the Pulaski Skyway, which trucks are restricted from. It merges onto Raymond Boulevard, which continues west from the US 1/9 and US 1/9 Truck interchange into Downtown Newark. The truck restriction on US 1/9 is for the "safety and welfare of the public" according to NJDOT, not a specific bridge defect. At this point, the truck route becomes a four-lane freeway, heading to the east. A short distance later, the road comes to an interchange with the New Jersey Turnpike (Interstate 95, or I-95) and Doremus Avenue before crossing over the Passaic River on a vertical lift bridge. Here, the route enters Kearny in Hudson County and continues east into industrial areas as the Lincoln Highway. The road has a right-in/right-out in both directions that provides access to Jacobus Avenue before it comes to an interchange with County Route 659 (CR 659). From here, US 1/9 Truck passes under a Conrail Shared Assets Operations (CSAO) railroad line and becomes a six-lane expressway, coming to an at-grade intersection with Hackensack Avenue. Past this intersection, the road crosses the Hackensack River on a vertical lift bridge and enters Jersey City. Upon entering Jersey City, the road becomes Communipaw Avenue and intersects the northern terminus of Route 440 near the Hudson Mall.

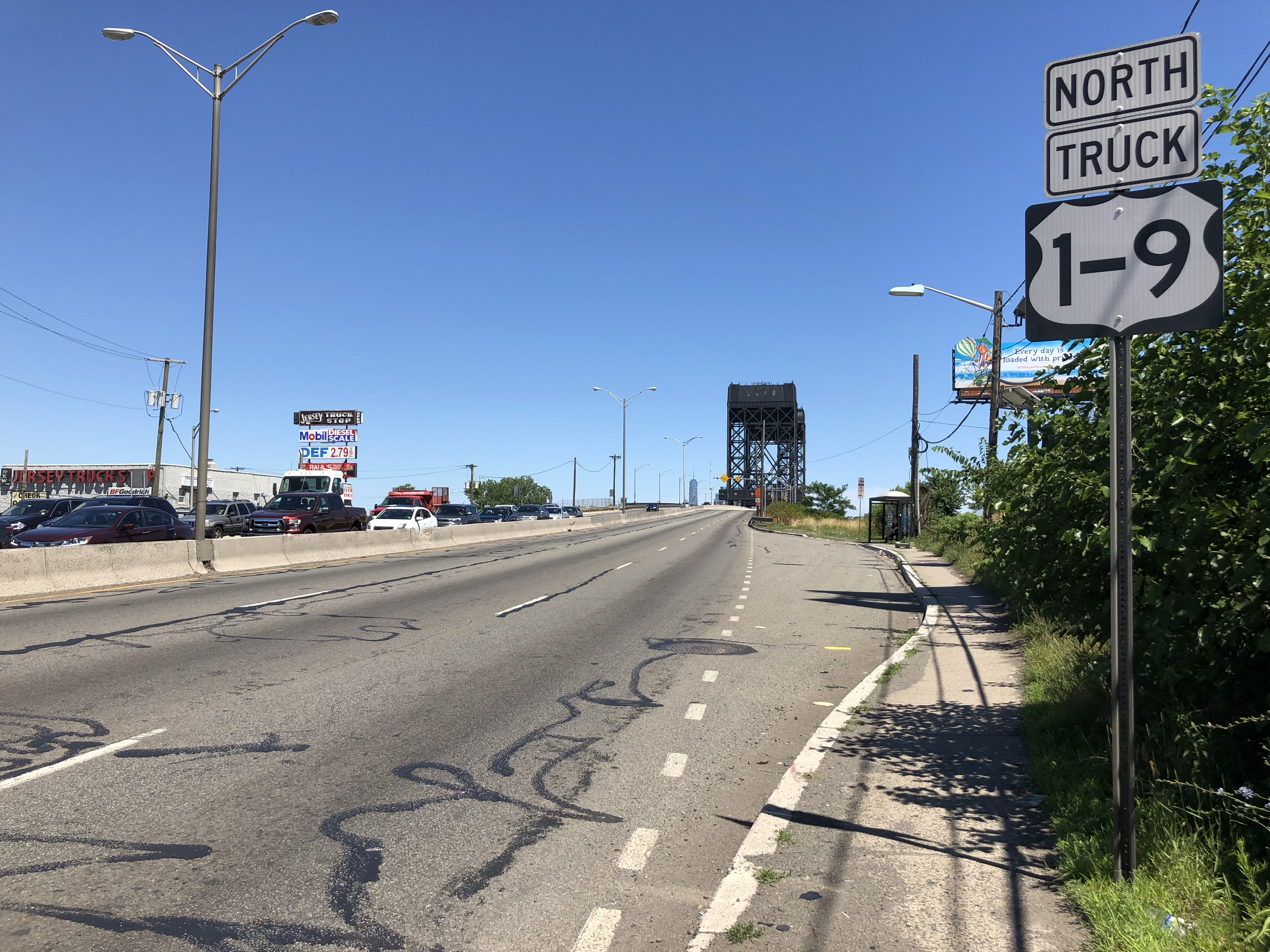
View north along US 1/9 Truck approaching the Hackensack River Bridge in Kearny

At this intersection, Communipaw Avenue continues to the east toward Communipaw and US 1/9 Truck turns to the north, becoming an unnamed four-lane undivided road and bisecting Lincoln Park before coming to an intersection with CR 605. Here, the road becomes a four-lane divided highway again, passing some urban business areas before running between wetlands to the west and Holy Name Cemetery to the east. The route heads into more commercial areas again before passing urban residences, coming to an intersection that provides access to the Pulaski Skyway. Here, US 1/9 Truck turns east on Broadway, running through a business district. A short distance later, it turns north onto an unnamed road with CR 642 continuing east on Broadway. The route passes under PATH's Newark–World Trade Center line and CSAO's Northern Branch line before crossing under the Pulaski Skyway. Immediately after, US 1/9 Truck intersects the eastern terminus of Route 7 and turns to the east, with CR 645 continuing north at this intersection. The truck route becomes a four-lane divided highway called the St. Paul's Viaduct that runs to the north of the Pulaski Skyway and passes through industrial sectors, crossing over the Northern Branch line and CR 646. A short distance later, US 1/9 Truck comes to the Tonnele Circle with US 1/9 and Route 139, where it ends.

The East Coast Greenway runs along the north side of the highway.

== History ==
Route 25T (1934–1953)

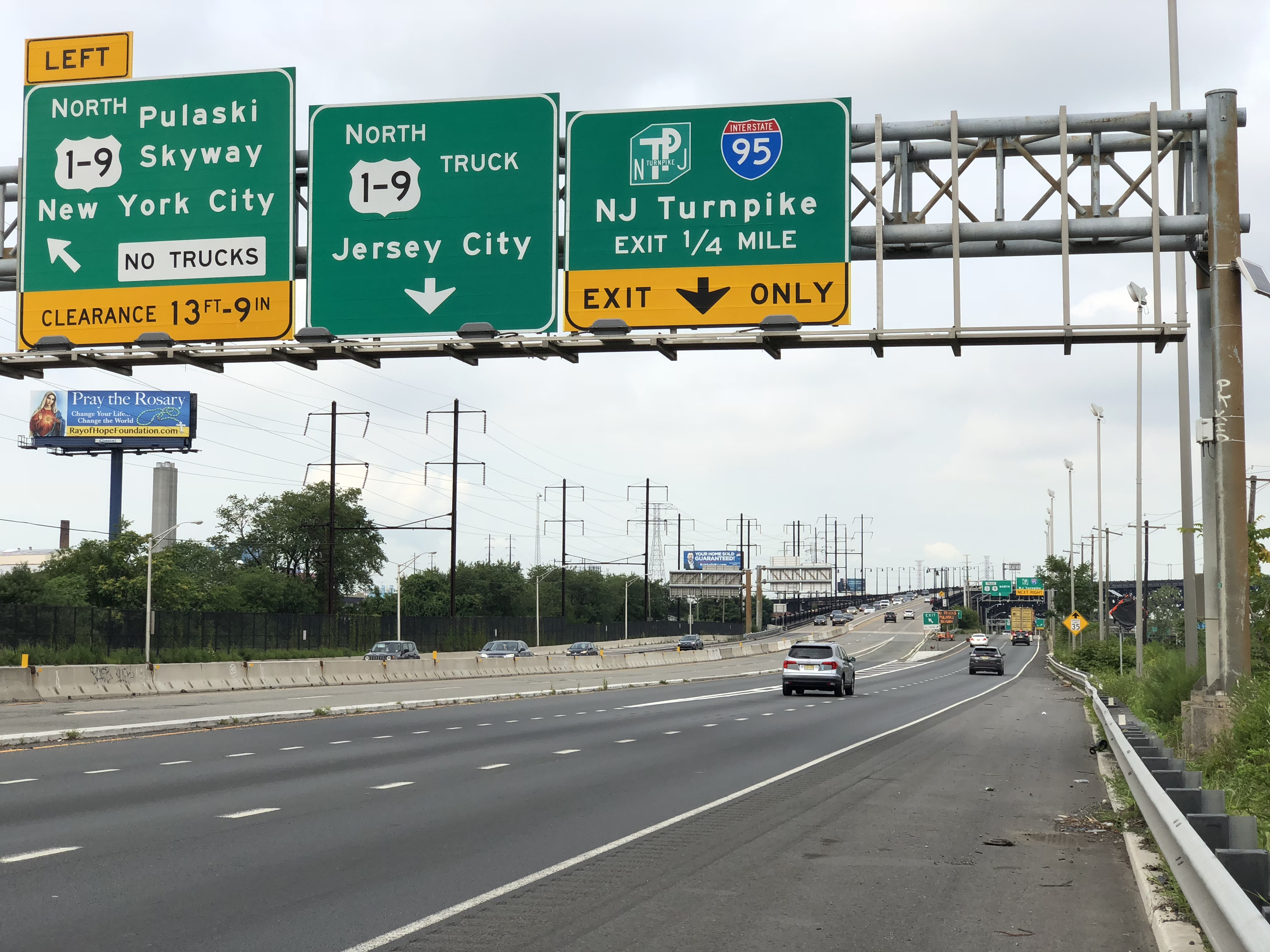
US 1/9 eastbound at the beginning of US 1/9 Truck in Newark, with a sign noting "No Trucks" on the approach to the Pulaski Skyway

What is now US 1/9 Truck between Newark and Jersey City was originally chartered as part of Ferry Road by the New Jersey Colonial legislature in 1765. The road stretched from Newark to Jersey City along Ferry Street, US 1/9 Truck, Communipaw Avenue, and Grand Street. The Passaic and Hackensack Ferry and Road Company took over maintenance in 1828, followed by the Newark Plank Road and Ferry in 1849 (not to be confused with the similarly named Newark Plank Road). Though the company's contract was to be extended for 50 years in 1900, this was overturned by the Supreme Court of New Jersey.

In 1913, the road west of Lincoln Park became the first segment of the Lincoln Highway. The current route of US 1/9 Truck was designated to be an extension of Route 1 in 1922, a route that was to run from Trenton to Jersey City.

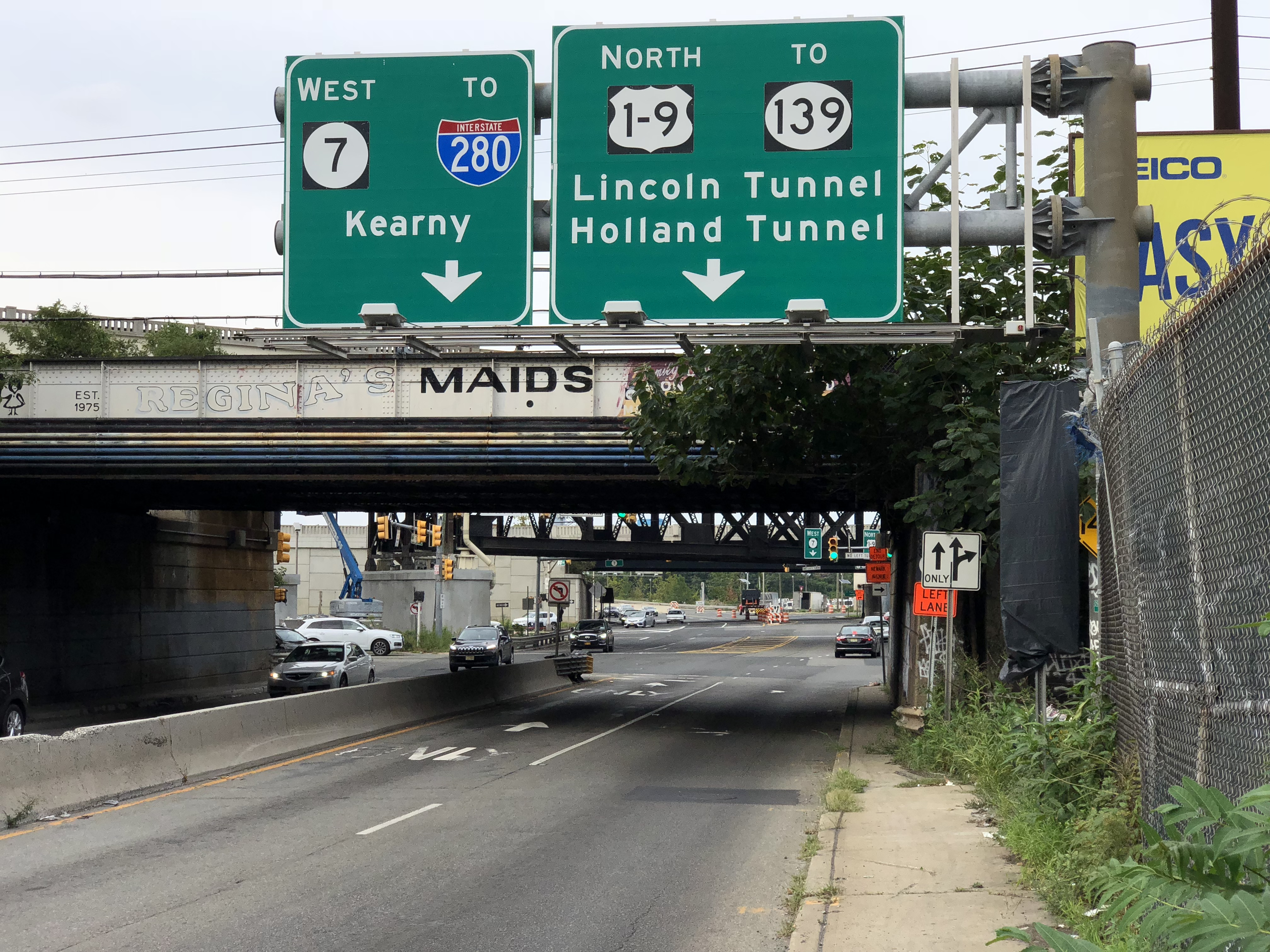
US 1/9 Truck eastbound at Route 7 in Jersey City

When the U.S. Numbered Highway System was established in 1926, the current truck route became a part of the US 1/9 concurrency. A year later, in the 1927 New Jersey state highway renumbering, Route 25 was designated to run along the entire length of the route along with US 1/9 as part of its journey from the Benjamin Franklin Bridge in Camden to the Holland Tunnel in Jersey City, while Route 1 was also designated along the portion north of Communipaw Avenue in Jersey City as a part of its routing from Bayonne to Rockleigh.

Following the opening of the Pulaski Skyway in 1932, US 1/9 and Route 25 were moved to the new bridge. After trucks were banned from the Pulaski Skyway in 1934, the portion of Route 25 between Newark and Route 1 was designated as Route 25T. In the 1953 New Jersey state highway renumbering, US 1/9 Truck was designated to replace all of Route 25T as well as the portion of Route 1 between Route 25T and the Tonnele Circle. (Note: 1953 renumbering)

Beginning in 2009, NJDOT replaced the viaduct that carries the route over St. Paul's Avenue and a CSAO line. The St. Paul's Viaduct was built in 1928 and determined structurally deficient. The $271.9-million (equivalent to $373 million in 2024) replacement was completed in September 2011. In addition to replacing the St. Paul's Avenue viaduct, the approaches to US 1/9 Truck between Route 7 and the Tonnele Circle were improved in preparation for the construction of the Replacement Wittpen bridge.

In 2021, with the opening of the new Wittpenn Bridge, the former intersection with Route 7 and US 1/9 was demolished, and the former overpass that originally bypassed the intersection was rerouted to the bridge instead. A replacement ramp to reallow traffic onto Newark Avenue after the ability to do so was removed at the intersection was opened on April 21, 2023, at 9:00 pm.

Studies are being conducted to make the intersection with Route 440 a multilevel traffic circle and to make the northern and southern (Route 440) approaches into a multi-use urban boulevard that includes grade separations and additional medians. The studies are in anticipation of a general increase of activity in Port of New York and New Jersey, as well as new development in West Side, Jersey City, and Hackensack River Greenway.

== Major intersections ==
County	Location	mi	km	Destinations	Notes
Essex	Newark	0.00	0.00	US 1-9 south to I-78 – Port Newark, Newark Airport, Jersey City, New York City	Southern terminus
Essex	Newark	0.14– 0.27	0.23– 0.43	Raymond Boulevard	Southbound exit and northbound entrance
Essex	Newark	0.41	0.66	I-95 Toll / N.J. Turnpike	Exit 15E on I-95 / Turnpike
Essex	Newark	0.56	0.90	Doremus Avenue	
Passaic River		0.67	1.08	Passaic River Bridge	
Hudson	Kearny	0.75	1.21	Jacobus Avenue	
Hudson	Kearny	1.13	1.82	Central Avenue (CR 659 east) – Kearny	
Hudson	Hackensack River	1.72	2.77	Hackensack River Bridge	
Hudson	Jersey City	2.27	3.65	Northern end of limited-access section	
Hudson	Jersey City	2.27	3.65	Route 440 south / Communipaw Avenue (CR 612 east) – Jersey City	Northern terminus of Route 440
Hudson	Jersey City	3.75	6.04	Route 7 west to I-280 – Kearny	Former Charlotte Circle; eastern terminus of Route 7
Hudson	Jersey City	4.11	6.61	US 1-9 (Pulaski Skyway / Tonnele Avenue) / Route 139 east – Hoboken, Secaucus, Holland Tunnel, Lincoln Tunnel	Tonnele Circle; northern terminus; western terminus of Route 139
1.000 mi = 1.609 km; 1.000 km = 0.621 mi: Incomplete access; Tolled
