= Tonnele Circle =

Traffic circle in New Jersey

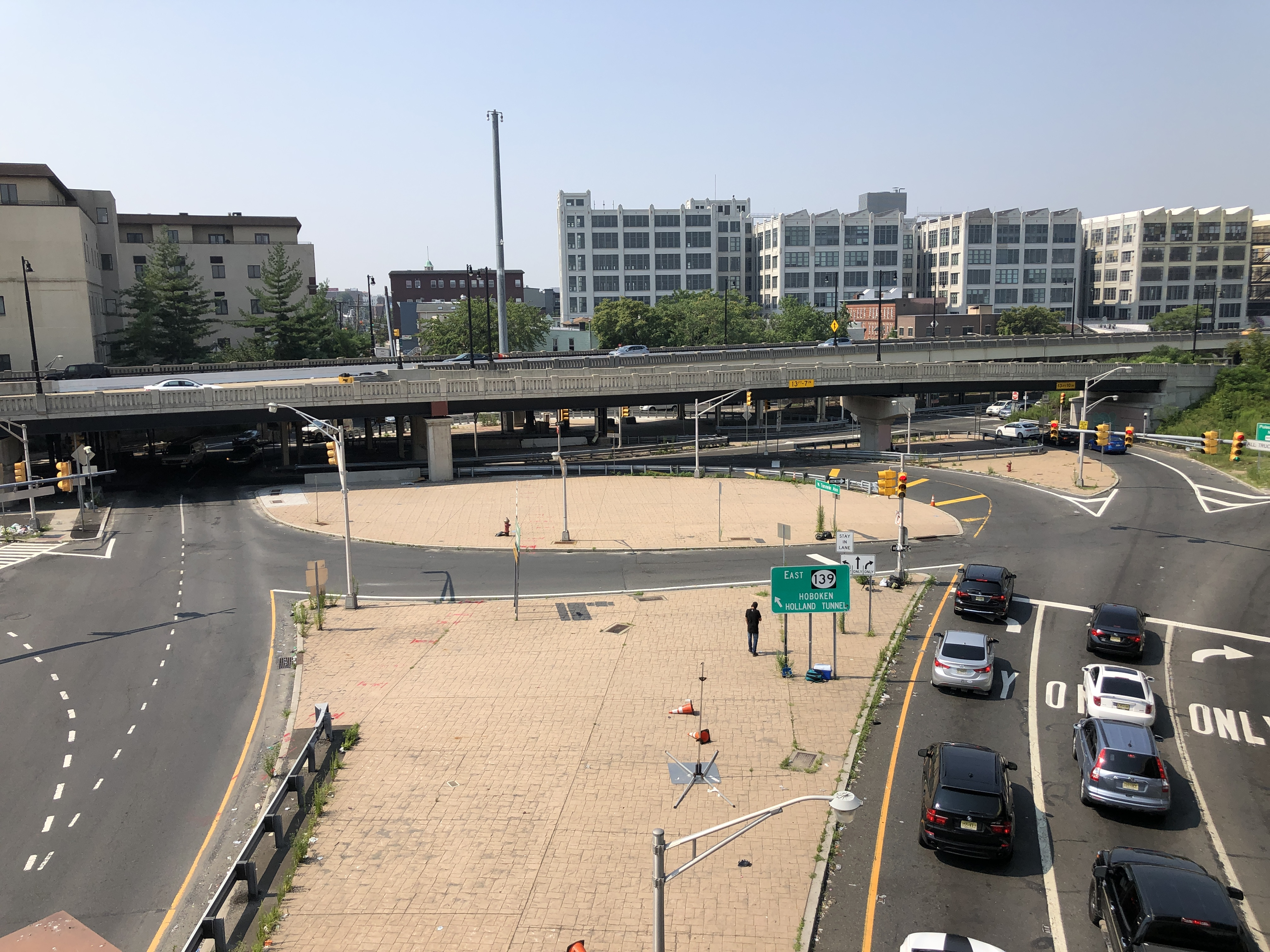
- View of the circle from the US 1/9 Truck bypass in July 2021
- Interactive map of Tonnele Circle

Location
- Jersey City, New Jersey
- Coordinates: 40.739405°N 74.065232°W
- Roads at junction: US 1-9 US 1-9 Truck; Route 139

Construction
- Type: Traffic circle

The Tonnele Circle is an intersection in Jersey City, New Jersey, United States. It is named after Tonnele ["TUN-uh-lee"] Avenue, the north–south road that runs through it.

== Entrances and exits ==
Entrances to and exits from Tonnele Circle are listed clockwise from north:

- Tonnele Avenue north (U.S. Route 1/9)
- entrance from Route 139 and Kennedy Boulevard
- exit to Route 139
- Tonnele Avenue south
- entrance from Pulaski Skyway (U.S. Route 1/9)
- Truck US 1/9
- exit to Pulaski Skyway (U.S. Route 1/9)

== History ==
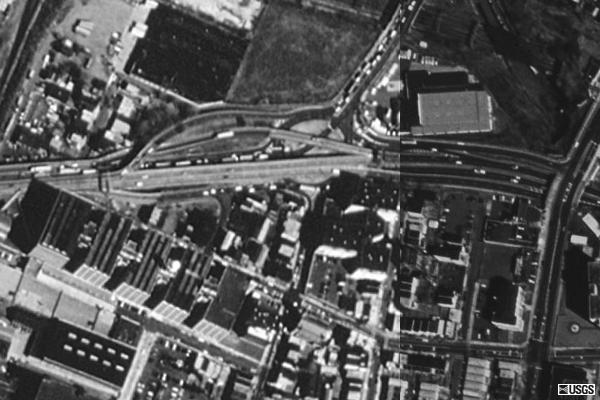
A pre-2010 picture of the Tonnele Circle from the air. Its original shape is still visible beneath the Pulaski Skyway and the modifications of 1938 and 1952.

Before the Pulaski Skyway was built, the cut through the New Jersey Palisades (now Route 139) ended at Tonnele Circle, where Tonnele Avenue went north and south, and the main road to Newark went west. To the east, just north of the road through the cut, was a connector road to Hudson County Boulevard (now renamed Kennedy Boulevard). When the Skyway was built, the old connection to Tonnele Circle became a left-side exit and entrance ramp to the Circle, with the Skyway passing over the Circle. Right-side exit and entrance ramps were provided between the Skyway and the Circle, with the southbound onramp exiting the circle north of the old road (now TRUCK US 1/9).

On September 14, 1938, a direct ramp, known as the Tonnele Circle Viaduct, opened from the cut, passing over Tonnele Circle, to TRUCK US 1/9. This greatly improved traffic, since southbound (westbound) trucks no longer had to pass through the circle. Northbound (eastbound) trucks still do, but they only cross the Tonnele Avenue south approach, which is relatively minor.

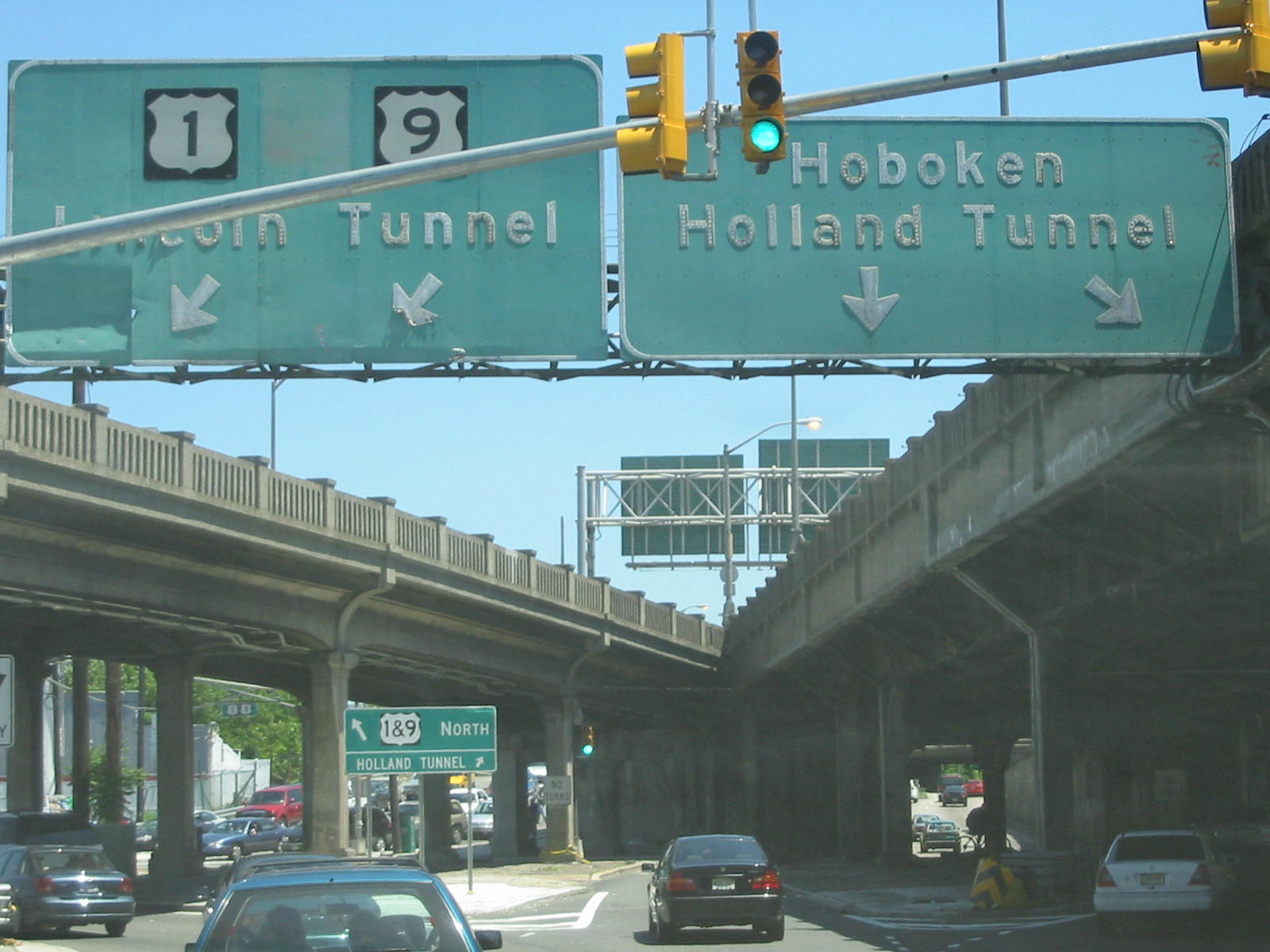
A pre-2010 picture of the underside of the Pulaski Skyway at Tonnele Circle, with the Tonnele Circle Viaduct (added in 1938, now demolished) on the left.

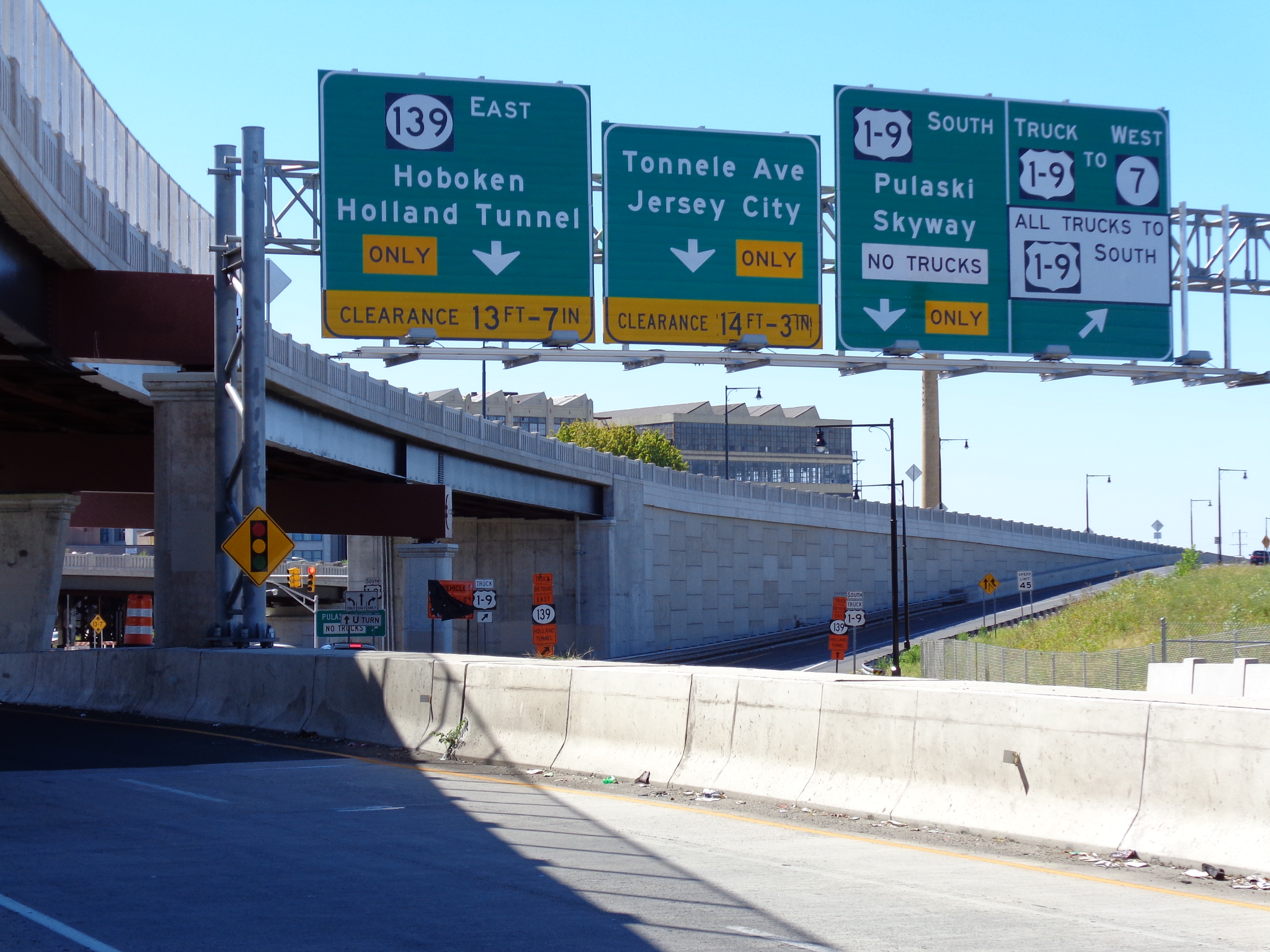
New Tonnele Circle bypass, 2013

In mid-1952, the circle was rebuilt. Northbound traffic from TRUCK US 1/9 could now go straight through the circle. Also at that time, or possibly earlier, the offramp from Route 139 was moved to the right side, and entered the Circle where the connector to Hudson County Boulevard had. The connector was modified to only go towards the Circle.

The circle was altered in 2005. A ramp was built to permit vehicles heading southbound on Tonnele Avenue to access the Pulaski Skyway without entering the circle. Additionally, ramps around and through the circle were modified to improve traffic flow, and traffic lights were added and recalibrated to reduce the chances of cross traffic being in an intersection simultaneously.

Throughout the early 2010s, the circle was rebuilt. Changes included traffic rebuilding the overpass that carried southbound US 1-9 Truck, relocating the left turn ramp that let US 1-9 traffic to turn onto NJ 139 or U-turn, removing the 1950s era ramp that let Wittpenn Bridge traffic onto US 1-9 north, narrowing the circle to one lane in most areas, updating signage, lighting, and traffic lights, constructing a new exit to let southbound US 1-9 traffic onto US 1-9 Truck to the Wittpenn Bridge, relocating the Tonnelle Avenue exit on US 1-9 south, and building a new St. Paul's Viaduct and relocating the overpass entrances to allow NJ 7 traffic to bypass the circle and get on to US 1-9 north from the Wittpenn Bridge.

In 2021, the Tonnele Circle Viaduct was connected to the newly created Wittpenn bridge.

== Naming ==
It is sometimes believed that the circle (and street) gets its name from the Holland Tunnel, since the circle was built for the tunnel. Hagstrom maps even label the circle as Tunnel's Traffic Circle. However, the circle was named after the street, and the street was probably named after a John Tonnele, who died in 1852, or one of his descendants. Information on the Tonnele family is sparse, but at least some of them lived in Jersey City, where the street now runs. The street was named by 1883. There is some confusion about the spelling - whether the name has one 'L' or two - even within Jersey City, and street signs reflect both options. However, the U.S. Postal Service favors "Tonnele," which reflects the spelling of the man after whom the street is named.

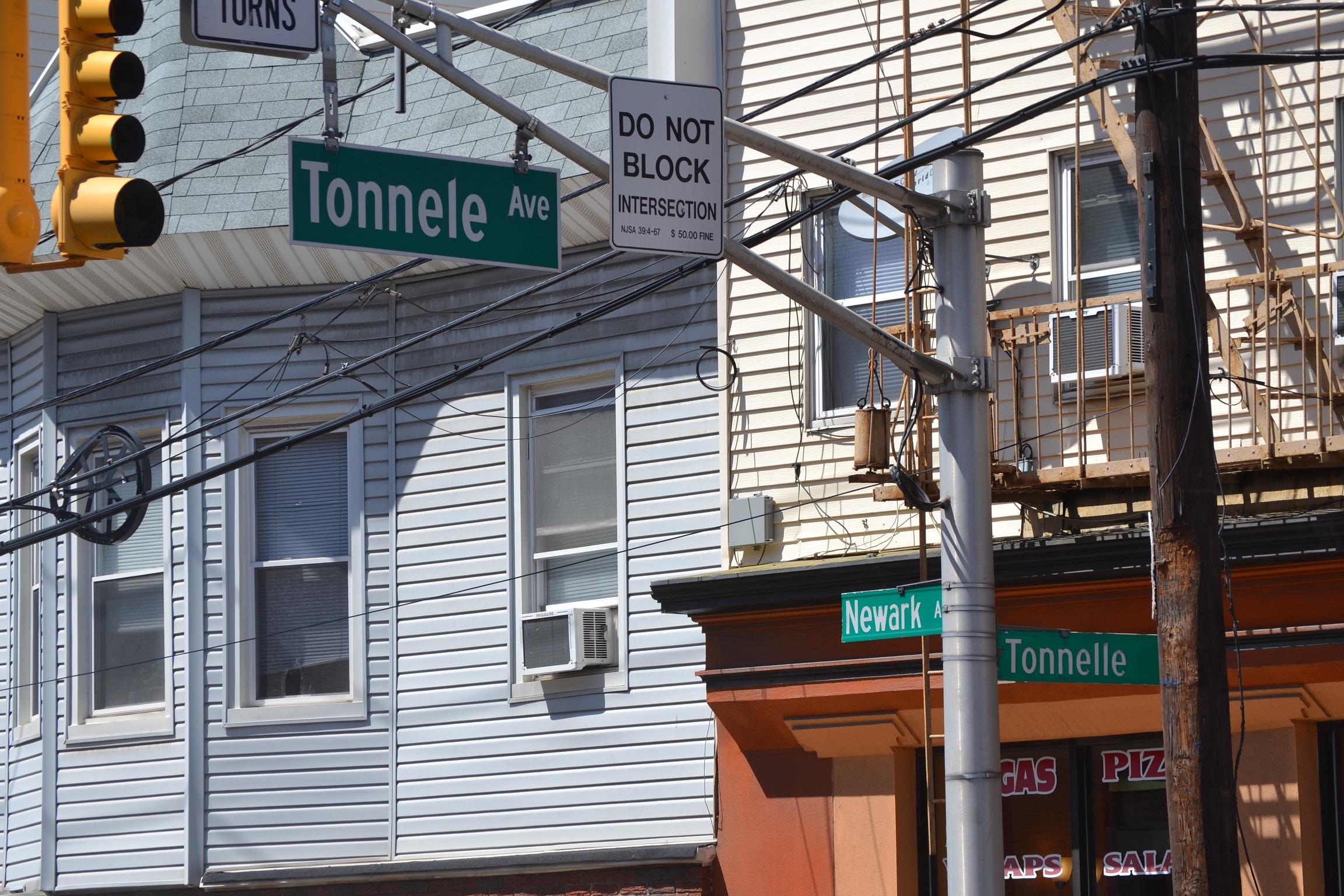
Intersection of Newark Avenue and Tonnele/Tonnelle Avenue in Jersey City showing two different spellings on two signs

== See also ==
- List of traffic circles in New Jersey
- Saint Peter's Cemetery (Jersey City)
- Odonyms in Hudson County, New Jersey
