= List of startup incubators in the United States =

Startup incubators and accelerators in the United States

This is a list of startup incubators and accelerators in the United States which are organizations that support the development and growth of startup companies through services such as business mentoring, networking, workspace, technical assistance, and access to financing. Startup incubators generally support companies over longer periods during their early development, while startup accelerators typically operate structured, time-limited programs designed to rapidly develop participating companies. Many accelerators and incubators also provide seed funding, make venture capital investments, or connect startups with angel investors and other investors.

== List ==
Startup Accelerators in the United States
Name	Headquarters
25Madison	New York City, New York
25th Street Collective	Oakland, California
500 Startups	San Francisco, California
1871	Chicago, Illinois
Advanced Technology Development Center	Georgia Tech
AlleyCorp	New York City
AlphaLab	Pittsburgh, Pennsylvania
Amplify.LA	Santa Monica, California
AngelPad	San Francisco
Atlanta Tech Village	Atlanta, Georgia
Berkeley SkyDeck	Berkeley, California
Betaworks	New York City
Blue Startups	Honolulu, Hawa'ii
Boomtown Accelerators	Boulder, Colorado
Capital Factory	Austin, Texas
Capital Innovators	St. Louis, Missouri
Coplex	Phoenix, Arizona
Dreamit Ventures	Philadelphia, Pennsylvania
Elemental Excelerator	Honolulu, Hawaii
Enterprise Development Center	New Jersey Institute of Technology
Entrepreneurs Roundtable Accelerator	New York City
Fledge	Seattle, Washington
Forum Ventures	New York City
Founders Factory	New York City
Fusion LA	Santa Monica
Gener8tor	Madison, Wisconsin
Google for Startups	Mountain View, California
HAX Accelerator	Newark, New Jersey
Imagine H2O	San Francisco
IndieBio	San Francisco
Innovation Pavilion	Centennial, Colorado
Innovation Works	Pittsburgh
Kairos HQ	New York City
LA Cleantech Incubator	Los Angeles, California
Lighthouse Network	Richmond, Virginia
Mach 37	Tysons, Virginia
Maine Technology Institute	Augusta, Maine
Manufacturing New York	Brooklyn, New York
MassChallenge	Boston, Massachusetts
MetaProp	New York City
MuckerLab	Santa Monica
NMotion	Omaha, Nebraska
Obvious Ventures	San Francisco
Pioneer Square Labs	Seattle
Pittsburgh Life Sciences Greenhouse	Pittsburgh
Plug and Play Tech Center	Sunnyvale, California
Portland Incubator Experiment	Portland, Oregon
San Jose BioCenter	San Jose, California
SOSV	Newark
South Carolina Research Authority	Columbia, South Carolina
StartX	Palo Alto, California
Swartz Center for Entrepreneurship	Carnegie Mellon University
TechNexus Venture Collaborative	Chicago
Technology Centre of New Jersey	North Brunswick, New Jersey
Techstars	Boulder
Teknekron Corporation	Incline Village, Nevada
The Brandery	Cincinnati, Ohio
The Founder Institute	Palo Alto
University City Science Center	Philadelphia
Y Combinator	San Francisco

== See also ==
- Corporate accelerator
- American dynamism
- Flex space
- Intel Ignite
- Kauffman Index of Entrepreneurship
- List of venture capital firms
- List of unicorn startup companies
- Startup company
- Startup Weekend (organization)
