= Ron Howden =

Ron Howden may refer to:

- Ron Howden (skier) (born 1967), Canadian-born British Olympic cross-country skier
- Ron Howden (musician) (1945–2023), English drummer for progressive rock band Nektar
