= Michael T. Scott =

American actor

- Born: Michael Tuders; October 28, 1977 (age 48); Queens, New York
- Occupations: Animator comedy writer Voice actor Owner, Operator, Happy Fatties

Michael T. Scott is an American comedy writer, animation director and creator of the Happy Fatties online cartoon series, which has been featured on several notable web video sites including, YouTube, Dailymotion, Yahoo! Video, Openfilm, Animation World Network, Crackle, Aniboom, Funny or Die and Newgrounds. He is also well-known and famous for producing the television series titled Kentucky Fried Memories.

Scott also wrote and produced three comedy albums Pre-chewed Appetizers and The Jim Panzee and Friends Funtime Radio Hour.

== Happy Fatties ==
Since 2009, Scott has created over 100 animated comedy shorts. Additional to being featured on several of the online video sites mentioned above, Scott's work was also featured on Frederator's Channel on the YouTube Original Channel Initiative. He was interviewed on Frederator Studios' blog in August 2011.

In 2013, Scott relocated from Tennessee to Colorado, and partnered with animation company, Worker Studio, as the studio's Head of Story from February to December. The partnership placed Scott's entire library of Happy Fatties cartoons under Worker Studio's original content. The partnership formed at the Business incubator in Centennial, Colorado, Innovation Pavilion.

== Phil Hartman fan letter ==
In 2011, Scott posted a handwritten letter online that he received in 1997 from Phil Hartman, and the letter went viral. Through the attention of this letter, Scott connected with Hartman's family and in May 2013, Worker Studio optioned the rights to develop Phil Hartman's Flat TV, but withdrew the option later in August.
