= New Jersey Route 155 =

Highway in New Jersey

Route 155
- Cinnaminson Avenue

Route information
- Maintained by NJDOT
- Length: 1.91 mi (3.07 km)
- Existed: 1953–unknown

Major junctions
- West end: Ferry docks in Palmyra
- East end: US 130 in Cinnaminson Township

Location
- Country: United States
- State: New Jersey
- Counties: Burlington

Highway system
- New Jersey State Highway Routes; Interstate; US; State; Scenic Byways
← Route 154	→ Route 156

Route 155 was a short state highway in the community of Palmyra, New Jersey in Burlington County. The route ran from the ferry docks to the north of the Tacony–Palmyra Bridge (Route 73) through the community, terminating at an intersection with U.S. Route 130. The highway was a former alignment of Route 73 before the construction of the bridge. The route originated as Route S41N in the 1927 renumbering. The route was decommissioned and turned over to Burlington County, who designated it as an extension of County Route 607.

== Route description ==
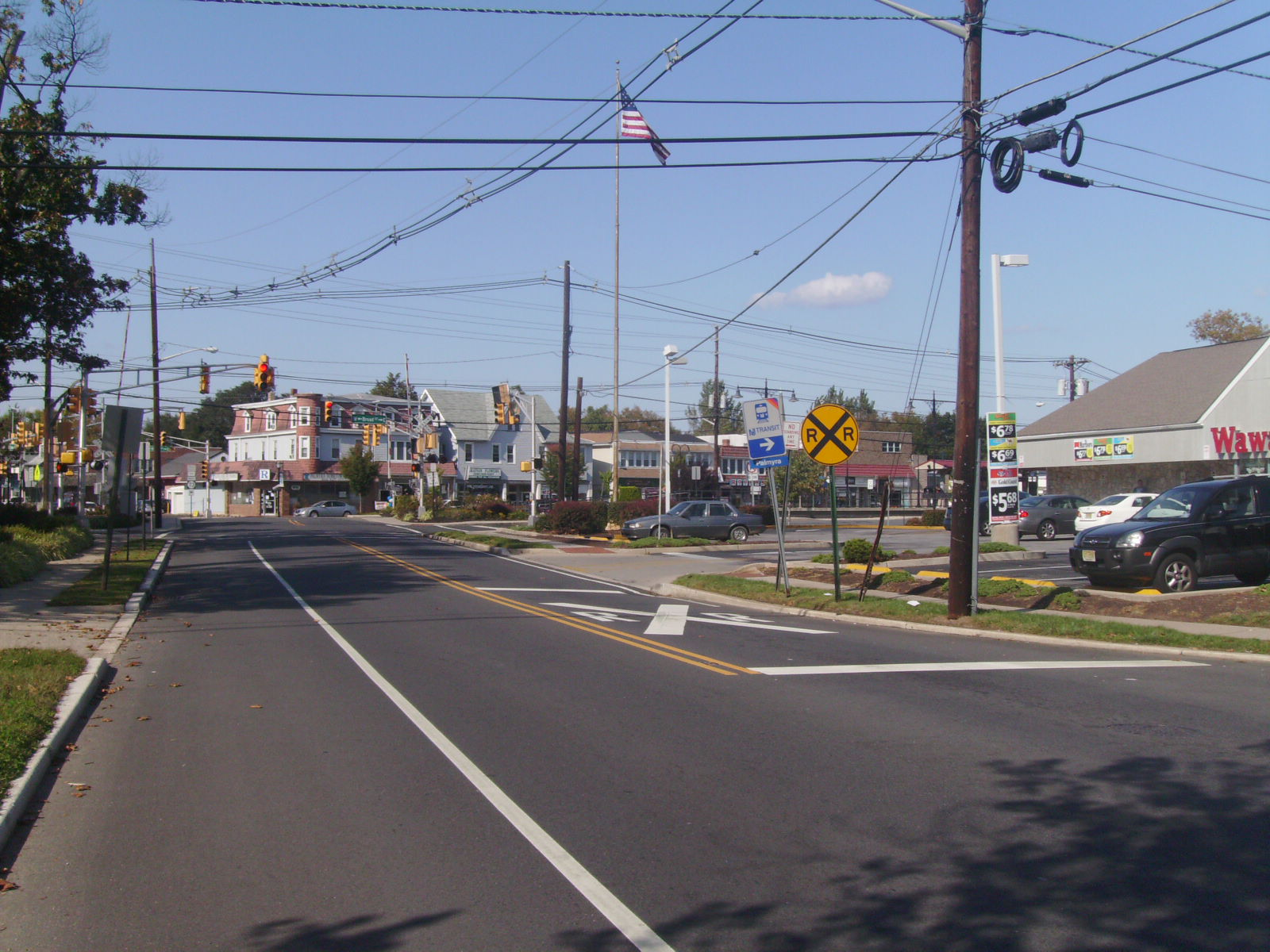
The former alignment of Route 155 heading towards County Route 543

New Jersey Route 155 began at the ferry docks in Palmyra, just to the north of the Tacony–Palmyra Bridge. The route headed eastward along Cinnaminson Avenue, intersecting with several local roads as it progressed from the harbor and into downtown Palmyra. A short distance later, Route 155, paralleling Route 73, and intersected with Broad Street (County Route 543) in Palmyra. The highway continued eastward to the southeast, following Cinnaminson Avenue until leaving downtown Palmyra. After leaving the community for Cinnaminson Township, the highway ended at an intersection with U.S. Route 130, a four-lane highway in the local area.

== History ==
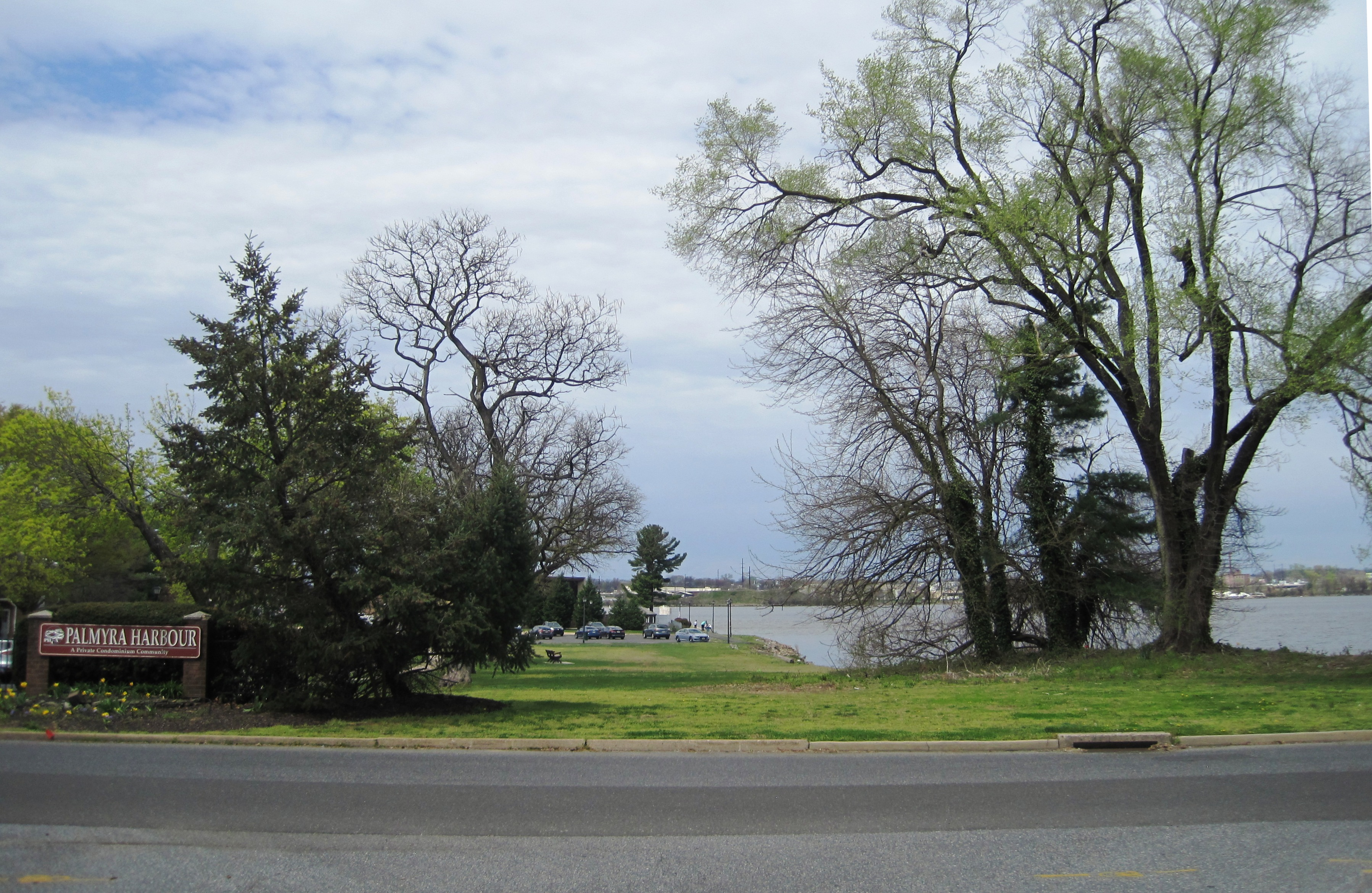
Site of the ferry landing to Philadelphia

Route S41N (1927-1953)

The original alignment of Cinnaminson Avenue in the community of Palmyra was originally a part of New Jersey State Highway Route 2, which was assigned in 1922, as a part of the original state highway system in New Jersey. Five years later, the highway re-designated during the period between the 1927 New Jersey state highway renumbering and year of 1941 as a spur of State Highway Route S-41, which is currently Route 73. The route designation remained intact for several years until the 1953 New Jersey state highway renumbering, when numerous highways around the state were given new designations. After the spur routes were dropped in the renumbering, the highway was re-designated as Route 155. Route 155's alignment was later turned over to the county of Burlington, who re-designated it as an extension of County Route 607.

== Major intersections ==
The entire route was in Burlington County.

Location	mi	km	Destinations	Notes
Palmyra	0.00	0.00	Ferry docks	Western terminus
Palmyra	0.52	0.84	CR 543 (Broad Street)	
Cinnaminson Township	1.84	2.96	US 130	Eastern terminus
1.000 mi = 1.609 km; 1.000 km = 0.621 mi
