= New Jersey Route 156 =

State highway in New Jersey, US

Route 156

Route information
- Maintained by NJDOT
- Length: 1.28 mi (2.06 km)
- Existed: 1953–present

Major junctions
- South end: US 130 in Hamilton Township
- North end: US 130 in Hamilton Township

Location
- Country: United States
- State: New Jersey
- Counties: Mercer

Highway system
- New Jersey State Highway Routes; Interstate; US; State; Scenic Byways
← Route 155	→ Route 157

Route 156 is a 1.28-mile (2.06 km) long state highway in New Jersey, United States. It is a short connector in Yardville, a census-designated place which is part of Hamilton Township, Mercer County. It is an old two-lane alignment of U.S. Route 130 (US 130) that was bypassed by a new multi-lane highway a short distance to the east in the 1950s, and designated just before the 1953 renumbering of state highways. The route intersects Route 130 at both termini; it carries local traffic to and from US 130 southbound through Yardville. The route has remained mainly intact since 1953.

== Route description ==
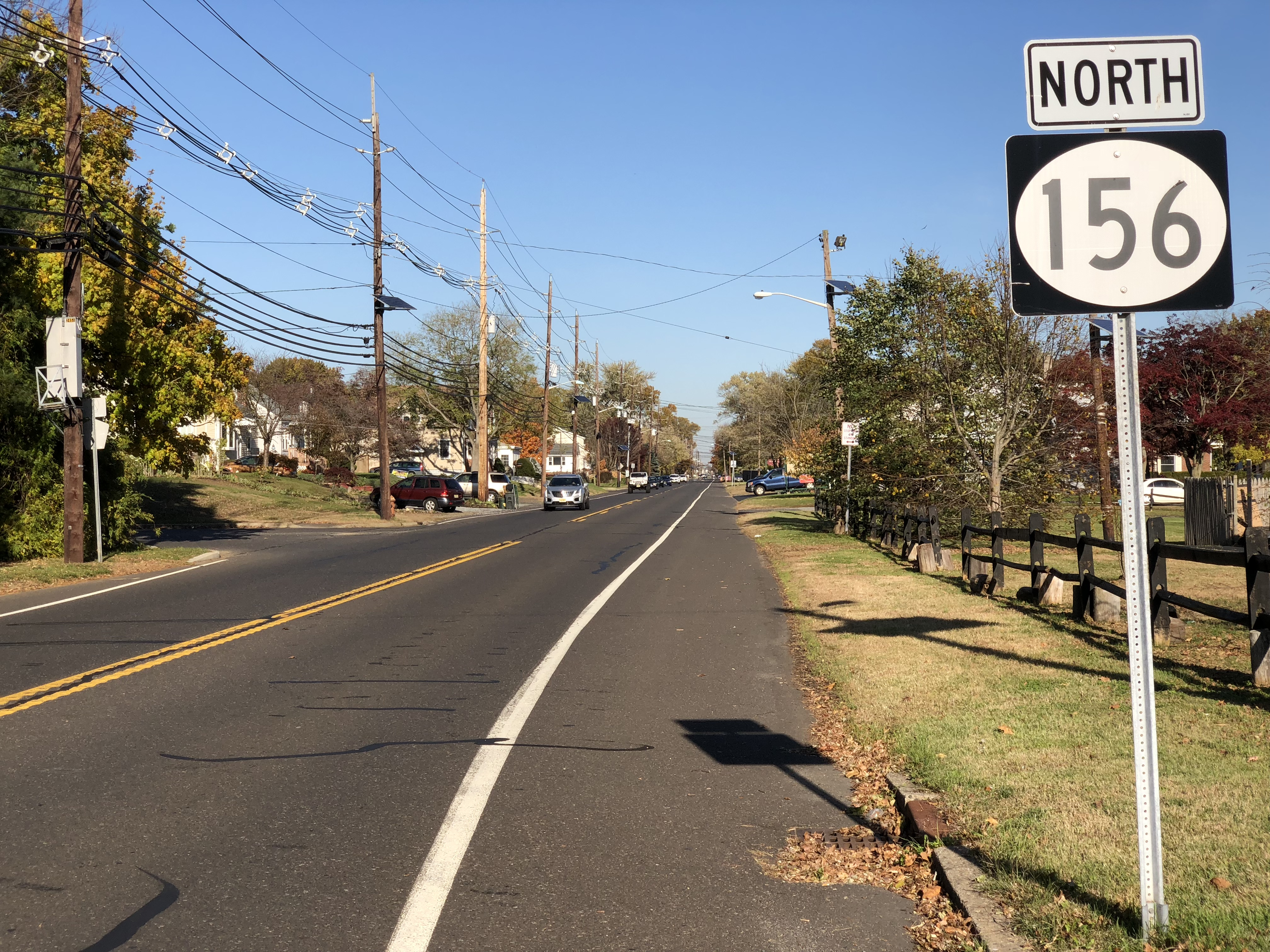
View north along Route 156 at CR 524 in Yardville

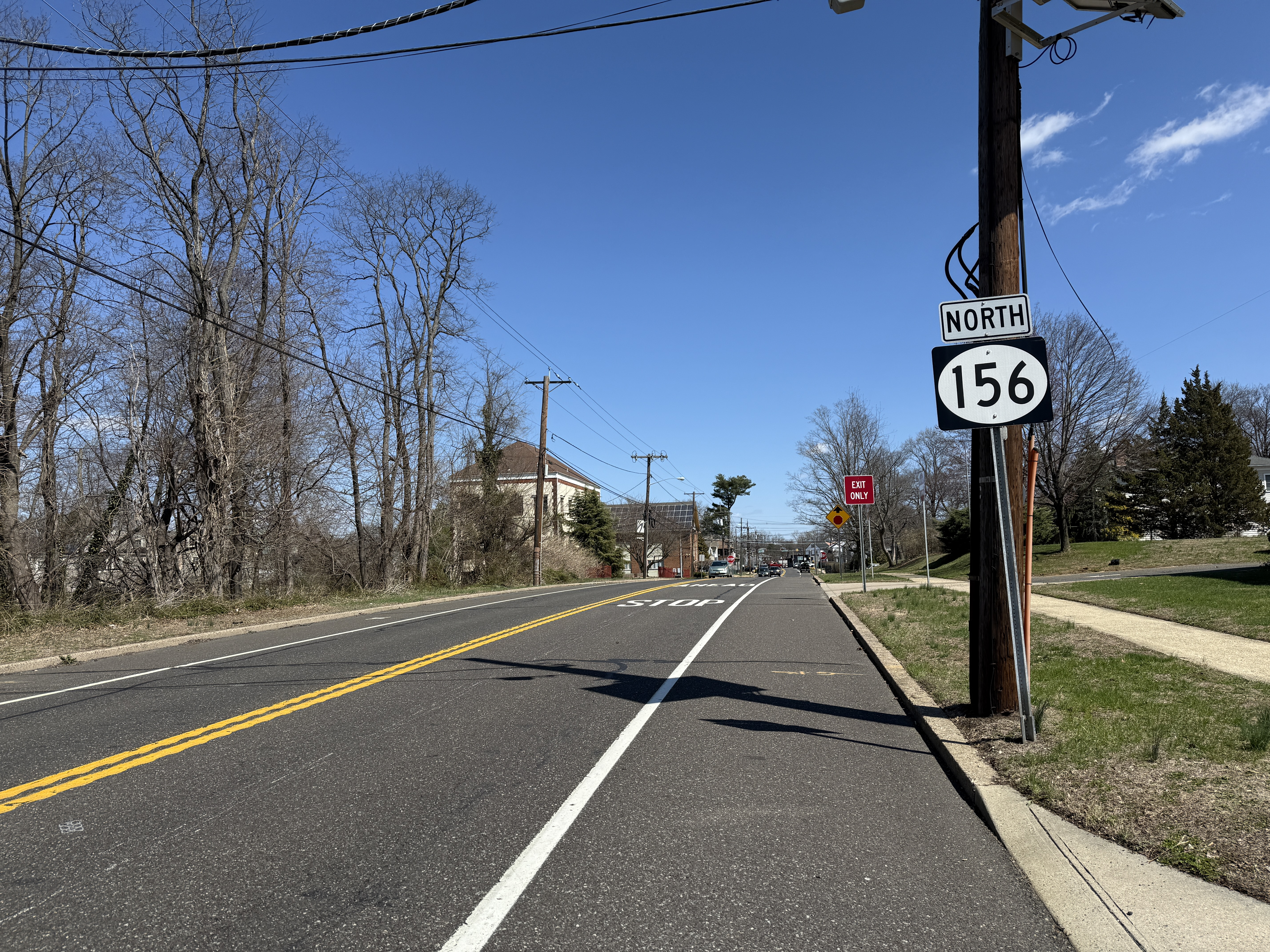
Route 156 northbound past CR 609 in Yardville

Route 156 begins at a right-in/right-out intersection with US 130 in Hamilton Township, just north of the Crosswicks Creek and the Bordentown Township, Burlington County border. The route passes a catering business before crossing Doctors Creek and heads northeast into the community of Yardville. In Yardville, the route parallels US 130 and several residential homes before intersecting Church Street (County Route 609 or CR 609) in the southern end of the community. After Church Street, the density of homes decrease and the road heads past a church and some businesses until it reaches a four-way stop intersection with South Broad Street (CR 672). A short distance after, Route 156 intersects CR 524 (Yardville–Allentown Road), which runs as the main thoroughfare in Yardville, at a signalized intersection. After CR 524, the highway continues to the northeast along the Route 130 parallel passing homes and local roads before the route merges back in with the southbound lanes at a different right-in/right out intersection.

There is no access to Route 156 to and from US 130 northbound; access to Route 156 and Yardville is provided through interchanges with each of the three county roads that intersect Route 156. Conversely, the only access to and from US 130 southbound is provided via Route 156.

== History ==
Route 156 was originally an alignment of State Highway Route 25 (co-designated US 130) in the 1927 state highway renumbering through Yardville. The route was realigned on a bypass around 1952, a year before the 1953 renumbering, in which Route 25 was decommissioned. Route 130 ran on a four-lane bypass to the east, while the alignment in Yardville became Route 156. Except for the removal of a ramp from the northern terminus of the route to US 130 northbound between 2008 and 2010, the route has remained virtually unchanged since then.

In 2014, Route 156 had the highest number of crashes among New Jersey state highways with 14.09 crashes per million vehicle miles of travel. Steve Carrellas of the New Jersey chapter of the National Motorists Association stated that the design of undivided roads contributes to a high crash rate and that while major highways have more crashes, the high volume they carry lowers their crash rate.

== Major intersections ==
The entire route is in Hamilton Township, Mercer County.

mi	km	Destinations	Notes
0.00	0.00	US 130 south – Bordentown	Southern terminus
0.57	0.92	CR 524 (Yardville–Allentown Road) to US 130 north – Trenton, Allentown	
1.28	2.06	US 130 south	Northern terminus
1.000 mi = 1.609 km; 1.000 km = 0.621 mi
