= New Jersey Route 171 =

State highway in Middlesex County, New Jersey, United States

Route 171
- Current Route 171 in red; former routing in pink

Route information
- Maintained by NJDOT
- Length: 0.98 mi (1,580 m)
- Existed: 1963–present

Major junctions
- South end: US 1 / US 130 in North Brunswick
- North end: Georges Road in North Brunswick

Location
- Country: United States
- State: New Jersey
- Counties: Middlesex

Highway system
- New Jersey State Highway Routes; Interstate; US; State; Scenic Byways
← Route 170	→ Route 172

Route 171 is a state highway in New Jersey, United States. It runs just under one mile (1.6 km) as an extension of U.S. Route 130 (US 130) past its northern terminus at US 1 in North Brunswick Township. The state highway ends along Georges Road near the border of North Brunswick Township and the city of New Brunswick. The route formerly extended into downtown New Brunswick ending at an intersection with Route 27, though the route was mostly unsigned inside New Brunswick. The route is a major thoroughfare in North Brunswick. The route originated as an alignment of pre-1927 Route 1 and later of US 130. After US 130 was truncated, the alignment, which had also been designated Route 25M, was later re-designated as Route 171.

== Route description ==
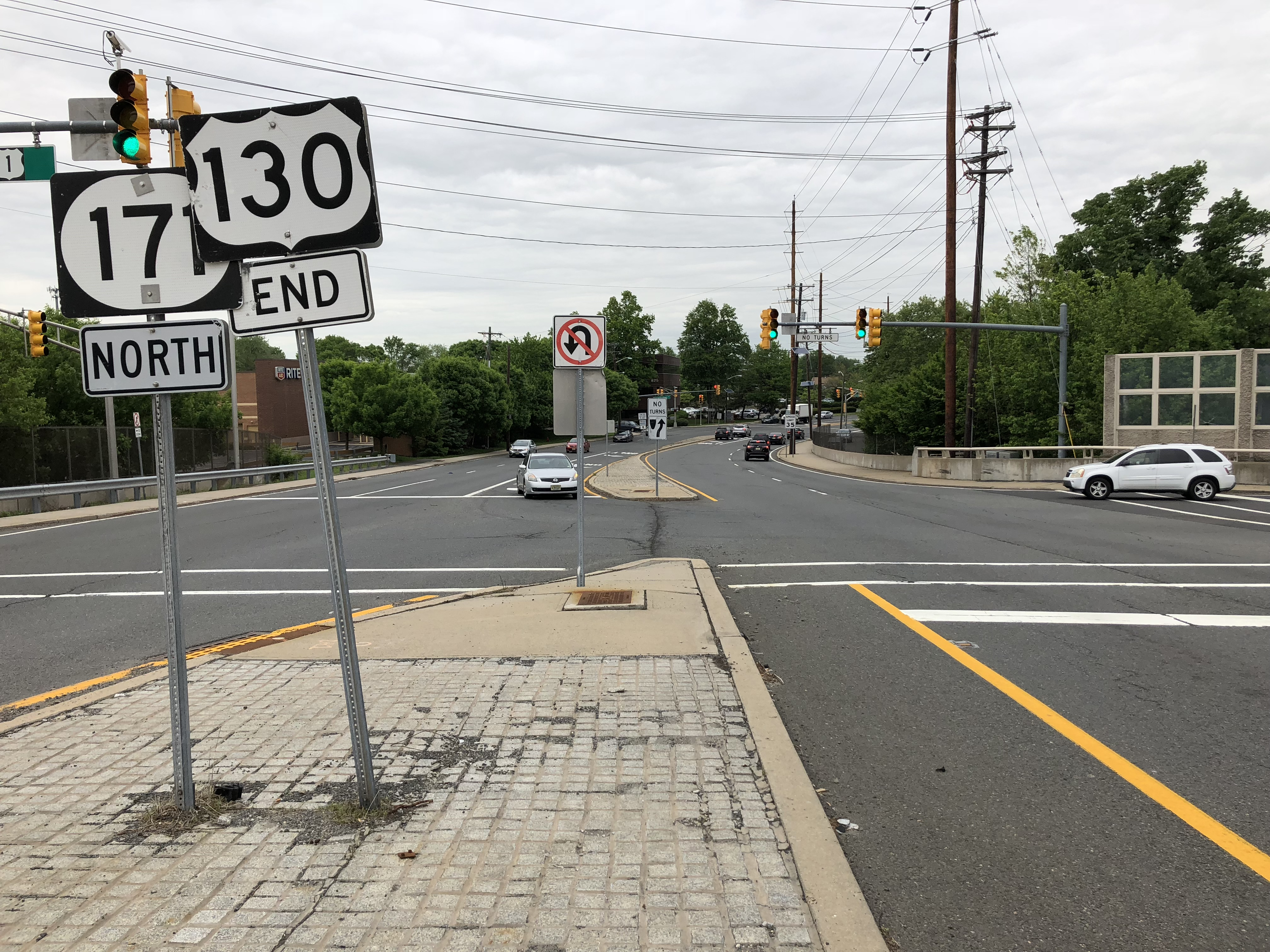
View north at the south end of Route 171 at US 130 and US 1 in North Brunswick

Route 171 begins at an interchange with US 130 and US 1 in North Brunswick (the official beginning being at the ramp from southbound US 1). The route, which continues as a right-of-way for US 130, heads northward along Georges Road as a four-lane road (two lanes in each direction) passing retail and office buildings and an apartment complex. At an intersection with Cranbury Cross Road, Route 171 turns to the northeast. The route heads northward, passing the Brunswick Shopping Center and intersects County Route 606 (CR 606; Milltown Road). The route continues to the northwest through North Brunswick narrowing to one lane in each direction with a center turn lane. Route 171 passes some retail businesses, the Van Liew Cemetery, and a residential neighborhood. After an intersection with Nassau Street, the road passes Elmwood Cemetery. Around the location where the center turn lane ends, state maintenance of Georges Road ends, therefore terminating the Route 171 designation, however the road continues into the city of New Brunswick.

== History ==
Route 25M
- Location: North Brunswick–New Brunswick
- Existed: 1934–1953

The highway dates back to the alignment of Route 1, assigned in the early 1920s. The designation remained in place until the 1927 New Jersey State highway renumbering, when New Jersey Route 25 was designated onto the alignment of U.S. Route 130, which was also designated in 1927. Route 25 was aligned on the entire alignment of Route 171, but by 1930, the route was realigned onto U.S. Route 1. The alignment of U.S. Route 130 remained along the alignment of Route 171 for several years, and by 1940, the northern alignment of Route 171 was designated as Route 25M. In the 1953 renumbering, Route 25M was redesignated Route 171, when Route 25 was decommissioned.

Prior to the truncation of Route 171 to North Brunswick by 2019, the Route 171 was carried along the county and city-maintained Georges Road, Commercial Avenue (renamed to Paul Robeson Boulevard in 2019), Suydam Street, Livingston Avenue, and George Street (the final street concurrent with CR 527) before ending at Albany Street (Route 27). With a small extension to the US 130 ramp to US 1 north at its southern end, the total length of the original route was 3.10 miles (4.99 km). No signage for Route 171 appeared along the New Brunswick segments of the route though one sign for it appeared at its intersection with Route 27 in July 2016.

== Major intersections ==
The entire route is in North Brunswick, Middlesex County.

mi	km	Destinations	Notes
0.00	0.00	US 130 south – Camden	Continuation south
0.00	0.00	US 1 – Newark, Trenton	Interchange
0.98	1.58	Georges Road	Continuation north
1.000 mi = 1.609 km; 1.000 km = 0.621 mi
