= Fusion VC =

Israeli venture capital program

- Type: Private
- Industry: Venture capital
- Founded: 2017
- Headquarters: United States
- Key people: Guy Katsovich, Yair Vardi
- Website: www.fusion-vc.com

Fusion VC is a venture capital firm and an accelerator for Israeli startups in the United States. It was founded in 2017 and is headquartered in the United States with offices in Israel.

== History ==
Guy Katsovich and Yair Vardi established Fusion VC, initially known as Fusion LA, in 2017, as an accelerator program that works with Israeli startups to establish a presence in the United States. The founders connected during their military service as officers in Unit 8200, Israel’s equivalent of the American National Security Agency (NSA). Initially, the accelerator invested US$20,000 in over 30 early-stage startups that participated in the program between 2017 and 2019. In early 2020, Fusion VC partnered with GoAhead Ventures, a venture capital firm from California, and increased their investment fund to US$110,000 per early-stage startup. As of mid-2024, Fusion VC is associated with more than 110+ early-stage startups across various industrial domains. Fusion’s total assets amount to $30 million. In 2023, Fusion completed a $20 million pre-seed fundraise in June 2023 and engaged in 22 new pre-seed investments and 7 follow-up investments in portfolio companies. The team made over 40 new investments in 2022-2023. Fusion VC was the most active fund in the Israeli market in 2023 and aims to make 60-80 new investments by 2026. The fund is backed by industry leaders, including Insight Partners and 70 other entrepreneurs and venture capitalists from Israel and the U.S.

In 2024, Fusion launched an industry report to increase access to information about the Israeli pre-seed market, including data on approximately 300 deals reported by 31 venture capital funds and 54 angel investors, along with internal Fusion data covering 900 potential deals from the past year.

Fusion VC screens and selects a portfolio of companies seeking to work with American partners and clients for its mentorship-driven program. The accelerator facilitates communication and networking between venture capitalists in the United States and the Israeli founders.

== Programs ==
Fusion VC selects between six and twelve startups for a nine-week program, each receiving a $150,000 cash investment, and access to a network of investors and executives in the United States. In 2020, due to the COVID-19 crisis and transition to remote work, Fusion VC announced a 3-week screening process from the first meeting to an investment decision. The accelerator produced virtual and in-person sessions for the founders with industry professionals, mentors, advisors and investors. As of 2023/24, Fusion’s accelerator includes an intensive two-month boot camp for leading investors and entrepreneurs held twice a year in Tel Aviv. Following the boot camp, the entrepreneurs participate in a three-week roadshow in Silicon Valley, New York, and Los Angeles, where they are introduced to American investors and mentors. The program's alumni network includes over 200 founders who share their experiences, lessons, and tools for leading a startup.

Fusion VC has invested in early-stage startups belonging to various industries such as enterprise software, digital health, artificial intelligence, environmental technology, video games, augmented reality, virtual reality, smart cities, fintech, and others.

As of 2024, Fusion VC has invested in 110 startups in 13 cohorts including Innplay Labs, Samplead, DigitalOwl, Agora, Base.AI, Behavidence, Spetz, Quack AI, Novacy, Acsense, Hoopo, and Magical. Over 70% of the companies have completed a successful investment round following the program, with an average of $2.5 million.

=== Additional Partnerships ===
In December 2020, Fusion VC launched the UAE-IL Tech Zone, a community initiative to advance cooperation of business and technology between the United Arab Emirates and Israel, post the Abraham Accords. Within a year, the organization amassed over 3,000 members and followers on social media, coordinated two delegations to the UAE, and hosted 12 virtual events on various tech and innovation topics.

In 2023, Fusion VC initiated the High-Tech Command Center, a volunteer not-for-profit civilian initiative in response to the terror attacks of October 7.

In 2024, Fusion launched a new investment track for early-stage digital health startups, partnering with Arkin Digital Health to invest $500,000 alongside the accelerator program.

== Notable Companies ==
- Innplay Labs was acquired by Playtika (NASDAQ: PLTK) in a deal valued at an estimated $300 million.
- Agora raised $20 million in Series A funding led by Insight Partners to accelerate the growth of real estate firms with digital transformation. They raised $34M Series B to develop the Carta for real estate, led by Qumra Capital.
- DigitalOwl raised $20 million in Series A funding for its AI medical analysis platform, with an additional $12 million from RGA, totaling over $38 million. The company has also partnered with Nationwide.
- Crowdvocate secured $15 million, led by Vertex Holdings, to support its customer-led growth strategy and underwent a rebranding, adopting the name Base.
- Clarity secured $16 million, led by Bessemer, in seed funding to develop its deepfake detection technology.
- Hoopo announced an agreement with ZIM to deploy tracking devices on ZIM's dry-van container fleet.
- ScaleOps raised $21.5 million in Series A funding, led by Lightspeed Venture Partners, NFX, and Glilot Capital Partners.
- Samplead raised $750,000 in pre-seed funding and generated over $1 million through LinkedIn and email campaigns, resulting in the sale of over 25,000 units.
