= North Brunswick, New Jersey =

Township in Middlesex County, New Jersey, US

- Township
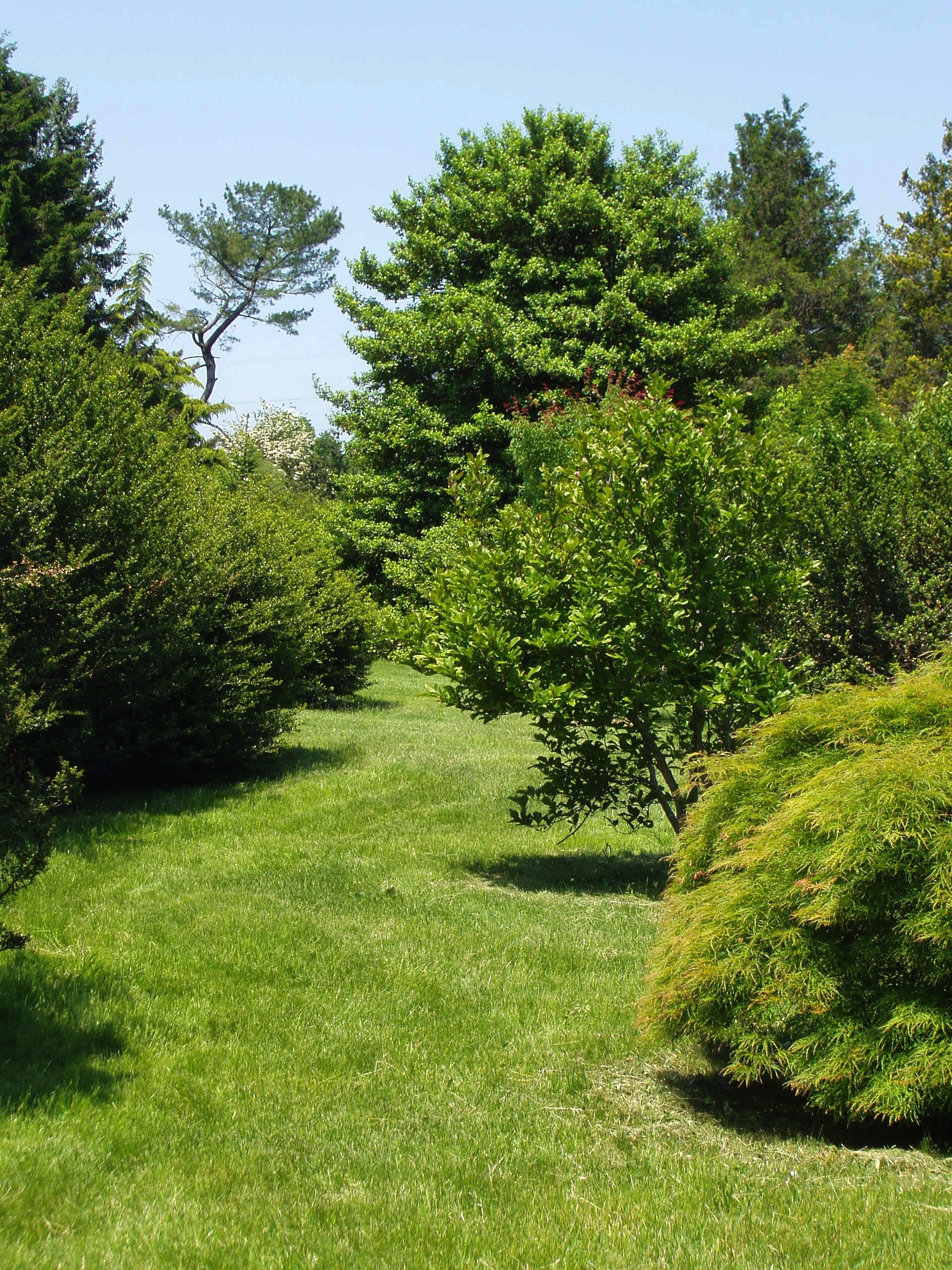
- Rutgers Gardens in North Brunswick

- Seal

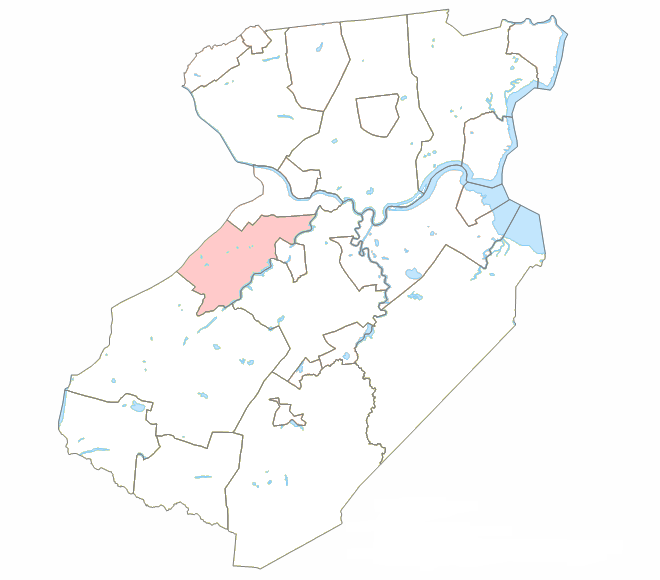
- Location of North Brunswick in Middlesex County highlighted in pink

- Location in Middlesex County Location in New Jersey Location in the United States
- Coordinates: 40.450392°N 74.479416°W
- Country: United States
- State: New Jersey
- County: Middlesex
- First mention: February 28, 1779
- Incorporated: February 21, 1798
- Named for: Braunschweig, Germany or King George II of Great Britain

Government
  - Type: Mayor-Council-Administrator
  - Body: Township Council
  - Mayor: Francis "Mac" Womack III (D, term ends December 31, 2027)
  - Administrator: Justine Progebin
  - Municipal clerk: Lisa Russo

Area
  - Total: 12.31 sq mi (31.88 km^{2})
  - Land: 12.03 sq mi (31.16 km^{2})
  - Water: 0.27 sq mi (0.71 km^{2}) 2.24%
  - Rank: 187th of 565 in state 10th of 25 in county
- Elevation: 121 ft (37 m)

Population (2020)
  - Total: 43,905
  - Estimate (2023): 44,108
  - Rank: 50th of 565 in state 11th of 25 in county
  - Density: 3,649/sq mi (1,409/km^{2})
  - Rank: 183rd of 565 in state 13th of 25 in county
- Time zone: UTC−05:00 (Eastern (EST))
  - Summer (DST): UTC−04:00 (Eastern (EDT))
- ZIP Code: 08902
- Area codes: 732 and 908
- FIPS code: 3402352560
- GNIS feature ID: 0882164
- Website: www.northbrunswicknj.gov

North Brunswick is a township in Middlesex County, in the U.S. state of New Jersey. It is centrally located in the Raritan Valley region within the New York metropolitan area. As of the 2020 United States census, the township's population was 43,905, an increase of 3,163 (+7.8%) from the 2010 census count of 40,742, which in turn reflected an increase of 3,455 (+12.3%) from the 36,287 counted in the 2000 census.

North Brunswick is located south of New Brunswick. It was named for its earlier-established neighbor, South Brunswick. Brunswick comes from New Brunswick, which was named after the German city of Braunschweig, formerly translated in English as Brunswick or for the British royal House of Brunswick. North and South Brunswick, in turn, became the namesakes for East Brunswick. Alternatively, the city gets its name from King George II of Great Britain, the Duke of Brunswick-Lüneburg.

== History ==
The area that would become North Brunswick had been settled by the Lenape Native Americans. European settlers from France and The Netherlands acquired land in 1772 from the Lenape that would become North Brunswick.

North Brunswick was first mentioned in Middlesex Freeholder Board minutes of February 28, 1779. North Brunswick Township was incorporated on February 21, 1798, by the New Jersey Legislature's Township Act of 1798 as one of the state's initial group of 104 townships. Portions of the township have since separated to create East Brunswick (February 28, 1860) and Milltown (January 29, 1889). Territorial exchanges were made with Franklin Township, Somerset County, New Jersey in 1850 and 1858, with South Brunswick in 1856 and with New Brunswick in 1860, 1917 and 1929.

== Geography ==
According to the U.S. Census Bureau, the township had a total area of 12.31 square miles (31.88 km^{2}), including 12.03 square miles (31.16 km^{2}) of land and 0.28 square miles (0.71 km^{2}) of water (2.24%).

Unincorporated communities, localities and place names located partially or completely within the township include Adams, Berdines Corner, Black Horse, Bodines Corner, Franklin Park, Georges Road, Livingston Park, Maple Meade, Patricks Corner and Red Lion. The northern portion of the township, near the New Brunswick border, is mainly middle class while the southern and eastern sections tend to be more affluent, with a few homes priced around $1 million.

The township borders the municipalities of East Brunswick, Milltown, New Brunswick and South Brunswick in Middlesex County; and Franklin Township in Somerset County.

Like many other New Jersey communities, North Brunswick is faced with the issues of suburban sprawl and open space preservation. The 104.91-acre (42.46 ha) Otken Farm property on Route 130 between Adams Lane and Renaissance Boulevard was purchased by the township to be converted into North Brunswick Community Park, which opened in April 2007. The nearby Pulda Farm, on Route 130 at Wood Avenue, however may be developed into an age-restricted community pending legal challenge. Re-development of the site of the former Johnson & Johnson pharmaceutical plant on U.S. Route 1 between Adams Lane and Aaron Road is currently the subject of a public hearing process that will determine what may be built on the property. There is also discussion of building an NJ Transit commuter railroad station on the site, along the Northeast Corridor Line. Other parcels slated for development into retail shopping centers include the currently wooded corner of Route 130 and Adams Lane diagonally across from the Maple Meade Plaza.

North Brunswick is part of the watershed of the Lawrence Brook, a tributary of the Raritan River. The brook's watershed covers 48 square miles (120 km^{2}) that also includes East Brunswick, Milltown, New Brunswick and South Brunswick. Farrington Lake, part of the Lawrence Brook watershed, is a freshwater reservoir bordered by North Brunswick, East Brunswick and South Brunswick.

== Demographics ==
Historical population
Census	Pop.	Note	%±
1790	2,312		—
1810	3,980		—
1820	4,275		7.4%
1830	5,274		23.4%
1840	5,866		11.2%
1850	10,019		70.8%
1860	1,145	*	−88.6%
1870	1,124		−1.8%
1880	1,251		11.3%
1890	1,238		−1.0%
1900	847	*	−31.6%
1910	990		16.9%
1920	1,399		41.3%
1930	3,622		158.9%
1940	4,562		26.0%
1950	6,450		41.4%
1960	10,099		56.6%
1970	16,691		65.3%
1980	22,220		33.1%
1990	31,287		40.8%
2000	36,287		16.0%
2010	40,742		12.3%
2020	43,905		7.8%
2023 (est.)	44,108		0.5%
Population sources: 1790–1920; 1840 1870 1880–1890; 1890–1910 1910–1930; 1940–2000 2000; 2010 2020 * = Lost territory in previous decade.

=== 2020 census ===
The 2020 United States census counted 43,905 people in the township, comprised of 15,339 households and 11,099 families. The population density was 3,649.0 inhabitants per square mile (1,408.9/km^{2}). There were 15,789 housing units in the township. The racial makeup was 39.3% (17,255) White, 20.9% (9,176) Black or African American, 24.6% (10,801) Asian, 0.2% (103) Native American, and 3.8% multiracial. Hispanic or Latino persons of any race were 20.9% (9,175) of the population.

The 2017-2021 American Community Survey reported 15,339 households, with an average household size of 2.70 persons. Of those households, 11,229 households were families. The average household size of families was 3.22 persons. 32.7% (5,105) households had children under the age of 18. The population under the age of 18 years was 9,707, and the population over the age of 65 years was 5,845.

The median household income of the township was $103,488 (+/- $5,388) and the mean income was $129,117 (+/- $11,272). Both numbers were reported in 2021 inflation-adjusted dollars. The per-capita income was $46,291 (+/- $4,254). Of the 30,408 people who were 25 years or older, 88.88% (27,027) had at least a high school diploma, 50.95% (15,493) had at least a bachelor's degree, and 21.95% (6,675) had a graduate or professional degree. Approximately 9% of the population is below the poverty line, including 16.0% of those under age 18 and 6.5% of those age 65 and over. The poverty rate of families stood at 5.2%.

=== 2010 census ===
The 2010 United States census counted 40,742 people, 14,551 households, and 10,404 families in the township. The population density was 3,396.2 per square mile (1,311.3/km^{2}). There were 15,045 housing units at an average density of 1,254.1 per square mile (484.2/km^{2}). The racial makeup was 46.61% (18,991) White, 17.47% (7,116) Black or African American, 0.42% (171) Native American, 24.27% (9,888) Asian, 0.04% (15) Pacific Islander, 8.16% (3,323) from other races, and 3.04% (1,238) from two or more races. Hispanic or Latino of any race were 17.73% (7,223) of the population.

Of the 14,551 households, 35.7% had children under the age of 18; 53.4% were married couples living together; 13.5% had a female householder with no husband present and 28.5% were non-families. Of all households, 22.3% were made up of individuals and 6.3% had someone living alone who was 65 years of age or older. The average household size was 2.72 and the average family size was 3.22.

23.4% of the population were under the age of 18, 8.4% from 18 to 24, 33.3% from 25 to 44, 25.6% from 45 to 64, and 9.3% who were 65 years of age or older. The median age was 35.5 years. For every 100 females, the population had 97.6 males. For every 100 females ages 18 and older there were 95.2 males.

The Census Bureau's 2006–2010 American Community Survey showed that (in 2010 inflation-adjusted dollars) median household income was $78,469 (with a margin of error of +/− $3,515) and the median family income was $91,053 (+/− $3,268). Males had a median income of $60,285 (+/− $3,591) versus $50,018 (+/− $2,499) for females. The per capita income for the township was $32,944 (+/− $1,441). About 4.5% of families and 6.8% of the population were below the poverty line, including 7.2% of those under age 18 and 5.3% of those age 65 or over.

=== 2000 census ===
At the 2000 United States census there were 36,287 people, 13,635 households and 9,367 families residing in the township. The population density was 3,018.3 inhabitants per square mile (1,165.4/km^{2}). There were 13,932 housing units at an average density of 1,158.8 per square mile (447.4/km^{2}). The racial makeup of the township was 62.73% White, 15.27% African American, 0.17% Native American, 14.20% Asian, 0.03% Pacific Islander, 4.70% from other races, and 2.89% from two or more races. Hispanic or Latino of any race were 10.40% of the population.

There were 13,635 households, of which 33.3% had children under the age of 18 living with them, 53.4% were married couples living together, 11.6% had a female householder with no husband present, and 31.3% were non-families. 24.5% of all households were made up of individuals, and 7.5% had someone living alone who was 65 years of age or older. The average household size was 2.58 and the average family size was 3.12.

23.0% of the population were under the age of 18, 8.0% from 18 to 24, 36.5% from 25 to 44, 22.5% from 45 to 64, and 10.0% who were 65 years of age or older. The median age was 35 years. For every 100 females, there were 98.7 males. For every 100 females age 18 and over, there were 95.3 males.

The median household income in the township was $61,325, and the median income for a family was $70,812. Males had a median income of $48,961 versus $35,971 for females. The per capita income for the township was $28,431. 4.7% of the population and 2.7% of families were below the poverty line. 4.7% of the population and 2.7% of families were below the poverty line. Of the total people living in poverty, 4.0% were under the age of 18 and 8.5% were 65 or older.

In addition to the township's residents, an average daily population of 1,182 inmates are housed at the Middlesex County Adult Correctional Center, located on Route 130 at Apple Orchard Lane.

== Government ==
=== Local government ===
North Brunswick is governed using the Faulkner Act's Mayor-Council-Administrator form of local government in New Jersey. The township is one of three of 564 municipalities in the state governed under this form. It was formed as a result of a Charter Study in 1982. One of the variations available under the Faulkner Act, the Mayor is directly elected by the voters and serves a term of four years, while the Township Council is comprised of six Council Members elected at-large to three-year terms of office on a staggered basis, with two council seats up for election each year. The primary responsibilities of the Council are to serve as the legislative body of the township, approve the annual budget presented by the Mayor, approve payment of bills and serve as liaisons to boards and committees.

As of 2024, the Mayor of North Brunswick is Francis "Mac" Womack III, whose term of office ends December 31, 2027. He has been mayor of the town since 2004. The Township Council is comprised of Council President Mary Hutchinson (D, 2024; elected to serve an unexpired term), Ralph Andrews (D, 2025), Robert Davis (D, 2026), Amanda Guadagnino (D, 2025), Rajesh Mehta (D, 2026) and Cologero "Carlo" Socio (D, 2024).

In April 2021, the Township Council selected Rajesh Mehta from a group of candidates submitted by the Democratic municipal committee to fill the seat expiring in December 2023 that had been held by Claribel Cortes until she stepped down from office the previous month when she was sworn into office as Middlesex County Surrogate.

In April 2020, the Township Council selected Claribel Cortes from a list of three candidates nominated by the Democratic municipal committee to fill the seat expiring in December 2020 that became vacant following the death of Robert Corbin.

Former mayors include Paul Matacera, who served for more than 16 years, and David Spaulding, the township's first Republican mayor in more than 25 years.

=== Federal, state, and county representation ===
North Brunswick is located in the 12th Congressional District and is part of New Jersey's 17th state legislative district.

For the 119th United States Congress, New Jersey's 12th congressional district is represented by Bonnie Watson Coleman (D, Ewing Township). New Jersey is represented in the United States Senate by Democrats Cory Booker (Newark, term ends 2027) and Andy Kim (Moorestown, term ends 2031).

For the 2026–2027 session, the 17th legislative district of the New Jersey Legislature is represented in the State Senate by Bob Smith (D, Piscataway) and in the General Assembly by Joseph Danielsen (D, Franklin Township) and Kevin Egan (D, New Brunswick).

Middlesex County is governed by a Board of County Commissioners, whose seven members are elected at-large on a partisan basis to serve three-year terms of office on a staggered basis, with either two or three seats coming up for election each year as part of the November general election. At an annual reorganization meeting held in January, the board selects from among its members a commissioner director and deputy director. As of 2025, Middlesex County's Commissioners (with party affiliation, term-end year, and residence listed in parentheses) are:

Director Ronald G. Rios (D, Carteret, 2027), Deputy Director Shanti Narra (D, North Brunswick, 2027), Claribel A. "Clary" Azcona-Barber (D, New Brunswick, 2025), Charles Kenny (D, Woodbridge Township, 2025), Leslie Koppel (D, Monroe Township, 2026), Chanelle Scott McCullum (D, Piscataway, 2025) and Charles E. Tomaro (D, Edison, 2026).

Constitutional officers are: Clerk Nancy Pinkin (D, 2025, East Brunswick), Sheriff Mildred S. Scott (D, 2025, Piscataway) and Surrogate Claribel Cortes (D, 2026; North Brunswick).

=== Politics ===
As of March 2011, there were a total of 22,079 registered voters in North Brunswick Township, of which 8,302 (37.6%) were registered as Democrats, 2,410 (10.9%) were registered as Republicans and 11,352 (51.4%) were registered as Unaffiliated. There were 15 voters registered as Libertarians or Greens.

United States presidential election results for North Brunswick
Year	Republican		Democratic		Third party(ies)	
Year	No.	%	No.	%	No.	%
2024	6,291	36.14%	10,349	59.45%	768	4.41%
2020	5,507	30.03%	12,606	68.73%	228	1.24%
2016	4,810	29.72%	10,915	67.43%	461	2.85%
2012	4,605	30.40%	10,367	68.44%	175	1.16%
2008	5,270	33.53%	10,290	65.47%	156	0.99%
2004	5,643	40.46%	8,180	58.65%	125	0.90%
2000	4,536	36.86%	7,328	59.54%	443	3.60%

In the 2012 presidential election, Democrat Barack Obama received 68.4% of the vote (10,367 cast), ahead of Republican Mitt Romney with 30.4% (4,605 votes), and other candidates with 1.2% (175 votes), among the 15,264 ballots cast by the township's 23,172 registered voters (117 ballots were spoiled), for a turnout of 65.9%. In the 2008 presidential election, Democrat Barack Obama received 65.0% of the vote (10,290 cast), ahead of Republican John McCain with 33.3% (5,270 votes) and other candidates with 1.0% (156 votes), among the 15,837 ballots cast by the township's 22,580 registered voters, for a turnout of 70.1%. In the 2004 presidential election, Democrat John Kerry received 58.4% of the vote (8,180 ballots cast), outpolling Republican George W. Bush with 40.3% (5,643 votes) and other candidates with 0.6% (125 votes), among the 14,010 ballots cast by the township's 20,477 registered voters, for a turnout percentage of 68.4.

Gubernatorial election results for North Brunswick
Year	Republican		Democratic		Third party(ies)	
Year	No.	%	No.	%	No.	%
2025	3,547	27.21%	9,373	71.89%	118	0.91%
2021	3,137	34.69%	5,800	64.15%	105	1.16%
2017	2,732	33.39%	5,259	64.28%	191	2.33%
2013	4,326	53.93%	3,596	44.83%	99	1.23%
2009	4,056	44.18%	4,482	48.82%	642	6.99%
2005	3,324	39.45%	4,766	56.56%	336	3.99%

In the 2013 gubernatorial election, Republican Chris Christie received 54.6% of the vote (4,326 cast), ahead of Democrat Barbara Buono with 44.1% (3,496 votes), and other candidates with 1.2% (99 votes), among the 8,034 ballots cast by the township's 23,385 registered voters (113 ballots were spoiled), for a turnout of 34.4%. In the 2009 gubernatorial election, Democrat Jon Corzine received 48.3% of the vote (4,482 ballots cast), ahead of Republican Chris Christie with 43.7% (4,056 votes), Independent Chris Daggett with 5.9% (547 votes) and other candidates with 1.0% (95 votes), among the 9,279 ballots cast by the township's 21,714 registered voters, yielding a 42.7% turnout.

United States Senate election results for North Brunswick1
Year	Republican		Democratic		Third party(ies)	
Year	No.	%	No.	%	No.	%
2024	5,298	32.48%	10,139	62.16%	874	5.36%
2018	3,845	31.13%	8,120	65.75%	385	3.12%
2012	4,274	29.99%	9,707	68.10%	272	1.91%
2006	2,948	37.20%	4,762	60.10%	214	2.70%

United States Senate election results for North Brunswick2
Year	Republican		Democratic		Third party(ies)	
Year	No.	%	No.	%	No.	%
2020	5,260	29.23%	12,326	68.50%	408	2.27%
2014	2,137	33.03%	4,240	65.54%	92	1.42%
2013	1,778	35.92%	3,132	63.27%	40	0.81%
2008	4,938	34.33%	9,136	63.52%	309	2.15%

== Education ==
The North Brunswick Township Public Schools serve students in pre-kindergarten through twelfth grade. As of the 2024–25 school year, the district, comprised of eight schools, had an enrollment of 5,926 students and 584.0 classroom teachers (on an FTE basis), for a student–teacher ratio of 10.2:1. Schools in the district (with 2024–25 enrollment data from the National Center for Education Statistics) are North Brunswick Township Early Childhood Center with 106 students in PreK, John Adams Elementary School with 561 students in grades PreK–4, Arthur M. Judd Elementary School with 587 students in grades PreK–4, Livingston Park Elementary School with 494 students in grades PreK–4, Parsons Elementary School with 566 students in grades PreK–4, Linwood School with 761 students in grades 5–6, North Brunswick Township Middle School with 754 students in grades 7–8 and North Brunswick Township High School completed in 1973, with 1,876 students in grades 9–12.

Eighth grade students from all of Middlesex County are eligible to apply to attend the high school programs offered by the Middlesex County Magnet Schools, a county-wide vocational school district that offers full-time career and technical education at its schools in East Brunswick, Edison, Perth Amboy, Piscataway and Woodbridge Township, with no tuition charged to students for attendance.

Portions of the Rutgers University School of Environmental and Biological Sciences (formerly Cook College) is located on College Farm Road off Route 1 on the northern end of the township. DeVry University has a campus in North Brunswick on U.S. Route 1 between Milltown Road and Ryders Lane. Chamberlain University's New Jersey location is in the township. Anthem Institute had a branch on Route 1 on the Technology Centre of New Jersey campus that closed in 2014 as part of a group of closures nationwide.

== Transportation ==
=== Roads and highways ===
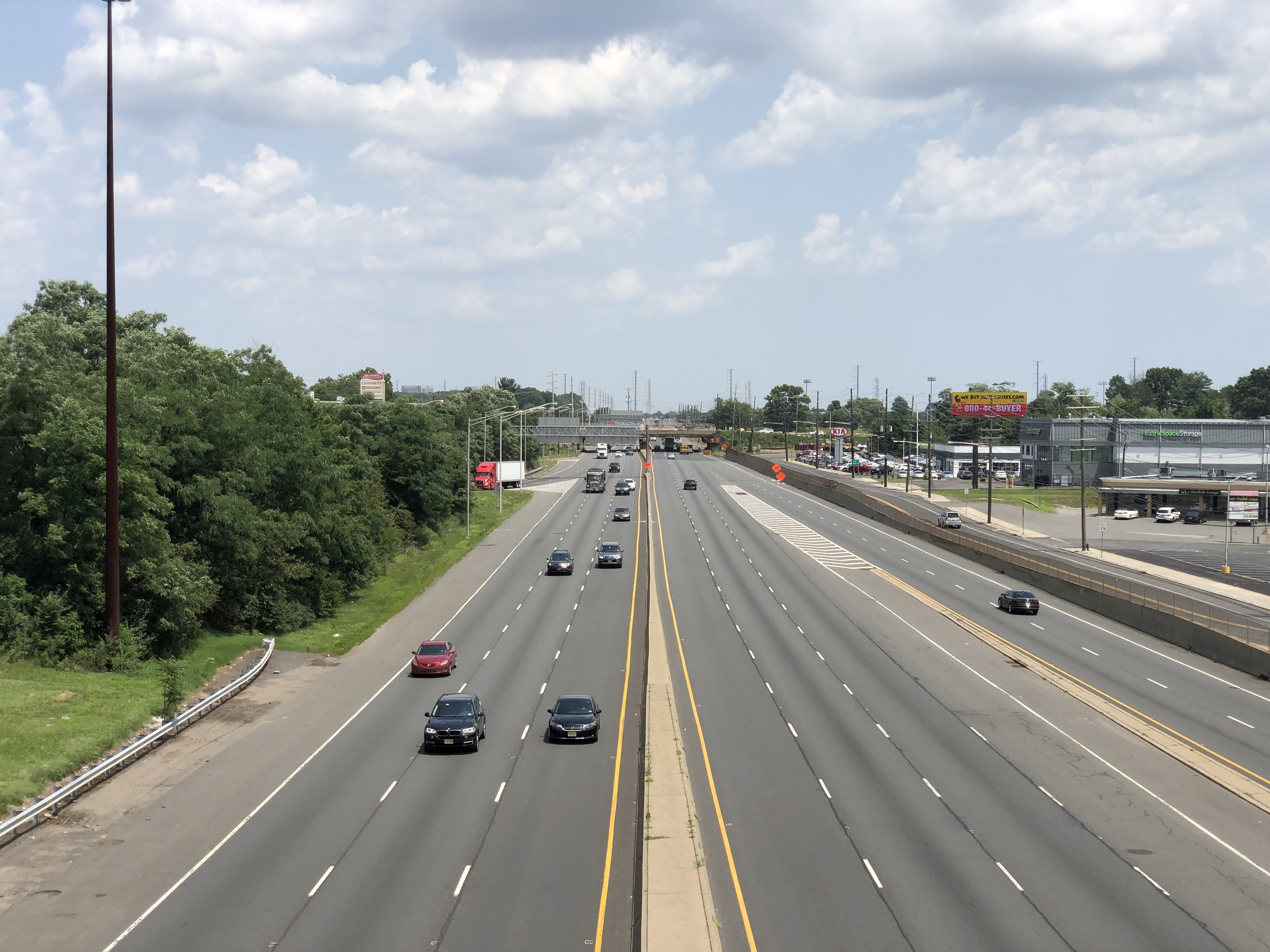
U.S. Route 1, the largest and busiest road in North Brunswick

As of May 2010, the township had a total of 101.51 miles (163.36 km) of roadways, of which 77.57 miles (124.84 km) were maintained by the municipality, 7.23 miles (11.64 km) by Middlesex County and 16.71 miles (26.89 km) by the New Jersey Department of Transportation. Major roads in North Brunswick include:

- U.S. Route 130, which begins at an intersection with Route 171's terminus.
- U.S. Route 1, the largest highway in North Brunswick.
- Route 26, also known as Livingston Avenue.
- Route 27, along the western border.
- Route 91, also known as Jersey Avenue.
- Route 171, which starts at the northern terminus of Route 130 as Georges Road in the Berdines Corner section of township and enters New Brunswick.
- County Route 682, also known as Finnegans Lane, a 1.05-mile (1.69 km) along the southern border.
- County Route 680, also known as How Lane
- County Route 620, concurrent with Nassau Street east of Georges Road/Route 171.
- County Route 608, in two sections known as Cozzens Lane and Adams Lane.
- County Route 606, also known as Milltown Road.

Limited access roads are accessible outside the township, such as Interstate 287 in bordering Franklin Township. The New Jersey Turnpike (Interstate 95) is accessible from exits in East Brunswick and South Brunswick.

=== Public transportation ===
NJ Transit Rail Operations (NJT) originates trains to Penn Station in Midtown Manhattan during peak hours from the Jersey Avenue station in New Brunswick. A new North Brunswick station on its Northeast Corridor Line has been proposed for the former Johnson & Johnson site on Route 1 and Aaron Road. In January 2013 NJT announced that the station would be built in 2018 in conjunction with the transit-oriented development. In addition to the new station the agency plans to build a flyover (balloon loop and flying junction) called the Mid-Line Loop south of the new station allowing trains turn around and enter and leave the Northeast Corridor without crossing over tracks. The new Mid-Line Loop would be in the location of a current minor Amtrak yard, Adams Yard, which is part of the larger County Yard complex.

NJ Transit provides local bus service on the 811 and 814 routes.

Middlesex County RIDE shuttles provide service on routes operating across the county, including the M1 route, which operates between Jamesburg and the New Brunswick train station and the M5 Jersey Avenue/Brunswick-Commercial Avenue Shuttle.

Suburban Trails offers service to and from New York City on Route 100 between Princeton and the Port Authority Bus Terminal; and Route 600 between East Windsor and Wall Street in Downtown Manhattan.

The Raritan River Railroad ran through North Brunswick, but is now defunct along this part of the line. Proposals have been made to use the line as a light rail route.

== Community ==
There are various communities within North Brunswick. One of many is the Italian American community. The Italian American community of North Brunswick and other Middlesex County towns celebrate their heritage annually at Carnevale Italiano, a decades-old carnival organized by the Italian-American Social Club. This event has been a huge part of North Brunswick's culture, as Middlesex County ranks fourth out of New Jersey's 21 counties in its population of Italian Americans. A highlight of the carnival is a fireworks show by Grucci.

Each year, the sports associations of the township host the North Brunswick Youth Sports Festival. The Heritage Day Committee which consists of Township residents (appointed by the Mayor of North Brunswick) and Liaisons from the Department of Parks, Recreation and Community Services (DPRCS) hosts a Heritage Day Event each year in North Brunswick Community Park. This festival showcases the many cultures that make up North Brunswick.

== Notable people ==
People who were born in, residents of, or otherwise closely associated with North Brunswick include:

- James Altucher (born 1968), hedge-fund manager, author, podcaster and entrepreneur
- Glen Burtnik (born 1955), songwriter, recording artist and performer who is a former member of the band Styx
- Sean Cameron (born 1985), soccer player who has represented Guyana in international play
- Nick DiPillo, head coach of the Le Moyne Dolphins women's basketball team
- John Forté (born 1975), music producer for the rap group the Fugees
- Joanna Gregory-Scocchi (born 1959), former member of the New Jersey General Assembly
- Mel Harris (born 1956), actress, known for her role on TV's thirtysomething
- Tim Howard (born 1979), goalkeeper who played for the United States men's national soccer team and for Everton FC in the Premier League
- Ron Howden (born 1945), drummer of 1970s British band Nektar
- Jim Norton (born 1968), comedian and actor
- Aries Spears (born 1975), comedian and actor, who was a performer on Fox's MADtv
- Tiquan Underwood (born 1987), former NFL wide receiver who is assistant wide receivers coach for the Dallas Cowboys
- Jenny Xie, poet and educator
