= Technology Centre of New Jersey =

Coordinates: 40.468°N 74.445°W

The Technology Centre of New Jersey is a science park in North Brunswick Township, New Jersey, United States, established by the New Jersey Economic Development Authority as a high technology business incubator. It can accommodate individual research and laboratory facilities up to 60,000 square feet (5,600 m^{2}), complete with clean rooms and wet labs.
