= Kauffman Index of Entrepreneurship =

The Kauffman Index of Entrepreneurial Activity, also known as the Kauffman Index of Entrepreneurship, is a leading indicator of new business creation in the United States, which has been cited in academic journals such as Small Business Economics.

The index uses monthly data from the current population survey (US) to calculate the percentage of the adult, non-business-owner population that starts a business each month, providing a national measure of business creation by specific demographic groups. Annual reports date back to 1996, allowing for comparisons over time.
