= U.S. Route 130 =

Highway in New Jersey

U.S. Route 130
- US 130 highlighted in red

Route information
- Auxiliary route of US 30
- Maintained by NJDOT
- Length: 83.4 mi (134.2 km)
- Existed: 1927–present

Major junctions
- South end: I-295 / N.J. Turnpike / US 40 / Route 49 in Pennsville Township
- US 322 in Logan Township; I-76 in Gloucester City; US 30 / Route 38 in Pennsauken; Route 73 in Pennsauken; I-95 Toll / Pearl Harbor Extension in Florence Township; US 206 in Bordentown Township; I-195 in Hamilton Township; Route 33 in Robbinsville Township; Route 32 in South Brunswick
- North end: US 1 / Route 171 in North Brunswick

Location
- Country: United States
- State: New Jersey
- Counties: Salem, Gloucester, Camden, Burlington, Mercer, Middlesex

Highway system
- United States Numbered Highway System; List; Special; Divided; New Jersey State Highway Routes; Interstate; US; State; Scenic Byways
← Route 129	→ Route 133

U.S. Route 130 (US 130) is a U.S. Highway that is a spur route of U.S. Route 30, located completely within the state of New Jersey. It is signed with north and south cardinal directions, following a general northeast–southwest diagonal path, with north corresponding to the general eastward direction and vice versa. The route runs 83.4 mi (134.22 km) from I-295 and US 40 at Deepwater in Pennsville Township, Salem County, where the road continues south as Route 49, north to US 1 in North Brunswick, Middlesex County, where Route 171 continues north into New Brunswick. The route briefly runs concurrent with U.S. Route 30 near Camden, about one-third of the way to New Brunswick. The road runs within a close distance of I-295 south of Bordentown and a few miles from the New Jersey Turnpike for its entire length, serving as a major four- to six-lane divided local road for most of its length. US 130 passes through many towns including Penns Grove, Bridgeport, Westville, Camden, Pennsauken, Burlington, Bordentown, Hightstown, and North Brunswick.

In 1916, pre-1927 Route 2 was designated to run along the present US 130 between the Camden area and Bordentown while pre-1927 Route 1 was to follow the current route between Robbinsville Township and New Brunswick. The current route between Penns Grove and Westville was to become pre-1927 Route 17S in 1923. In 1926, US 130 was designated to run from U.S. Route 30 in Camden to US 1 in Trenton along the alignment of pre-1927 Route 2. A year later, the alignment of US 130 became Route 25 between Camden and Bordentown, Route 39 between Bordentown and White Horse, and Route 37 between White Horse and Trenton. US 130 was extended to Pennsville in 1938 along Route 45 and Route 44 while it was realigned to follow Route 25 and Route 25M between Bordentown and Route 27 in New Brunswick by the 1940s. In 1953, the state highways running concurrent with US 130 were removed. Around the time of the renumbering, limited-access bypasses for US 130 were built around Carneys Point Township and between Bridgeport and Westville; the former alignments eventually became Route 44. In the 1960s, I-295 was designated onto most of these freeway alignments of US 130, which was moved back to its original route in Carneys Point. In 1969, the north end of US 130 was cut back to its current location, with the old road into New Brunswick becoming Route 171. The Delaware Valley Regional Planning Commission had proposed a US 130 freeway between Camden and Burlington, but it was never built.

== Route description ==
=== Salem and Gloucester counties ===
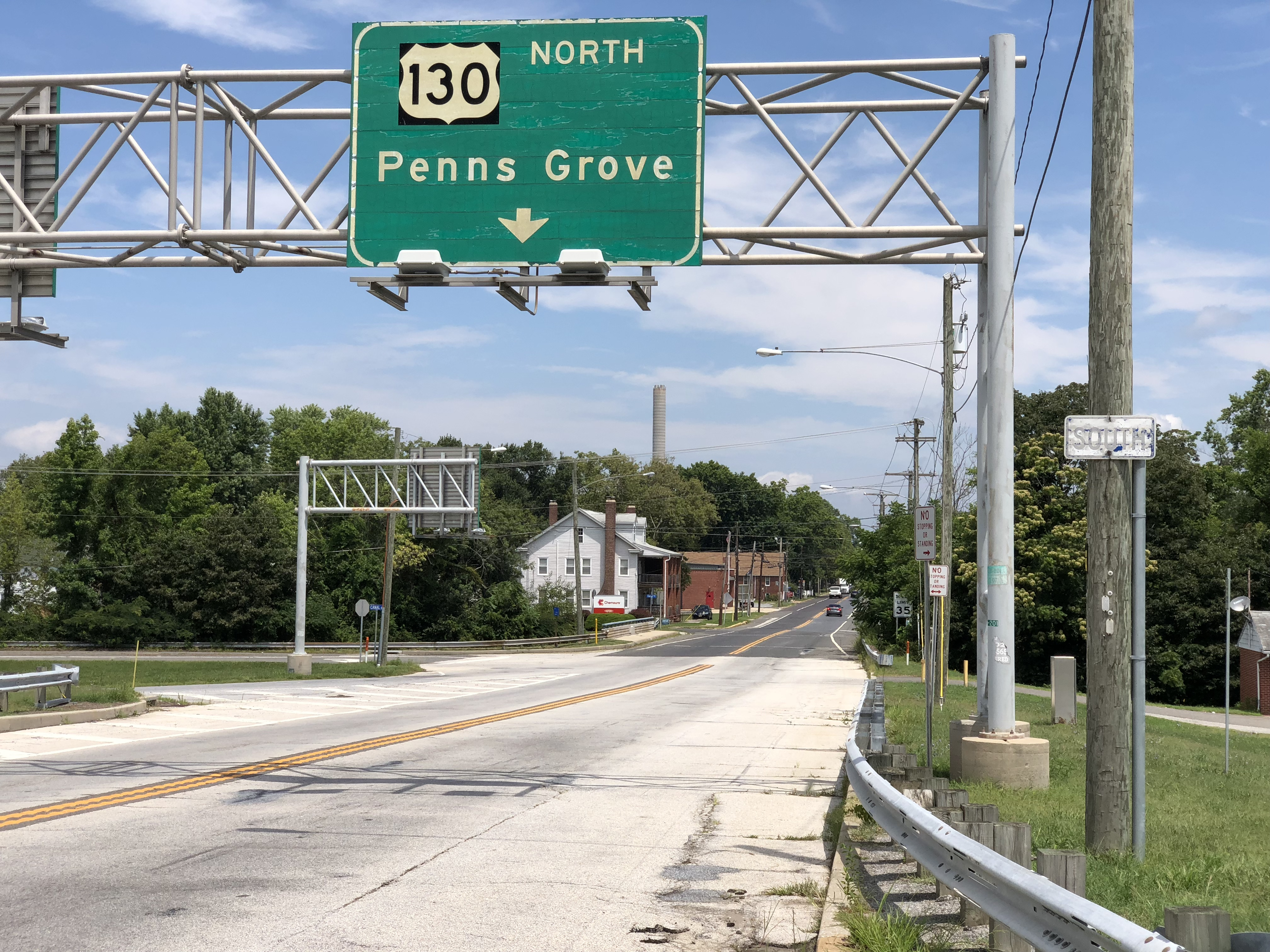
US 130 northbound at I-295/NJ Turnpike/US 40/Route 49 in Pennsville Township

US 130's south end is in Pennsville Township, Salem County, at the east end of the Delaware Memorial Bridge, which carries Interstate 295 and U.S. Route 40. The New Jersey Turnpike begins at this interchange, and Route 49 heads south. From here, the route heads northeast on Shell Road, a two-lane undivided road, passing development before entering Carneys Point Township. In Carneys Point Township, the road intersects with Hawks Bridge Road (Route 140) before passing to the east of a DuPont plant and a Conrail Shared Assets Operations railroad yard near wooded areas. US 130 makes a turn to the north at a roundabout with Hollywood Avenue (CR 618) into more residential development, crossing into Penns Grove, where the route turns northeast again as Virginia Avenue and intersects with East Main Street (Route 48). Past the intersection of East Main Street (Route 48), the road enters Carneys Point again and crosses the Conrail Shared Assets Operations' Penns Grove Secondary railroad line before continuing through a mix of agricultural and industrial areas. Upon entering Oldmans Township, US 130 heads through more rural areas as Crown Point Road.

After crossing the Oldmans Creek on a former drawbridge, the route enters Logan Township, Gloucester County, and becomes a four-lane divided highway continuing as Crown Point Road. It heads east-northeast through Nortonville before continuing through marshland and woodland. After crossing the Raccoon Creek on a fixed bridge, the road passes some homes in Bridgeport before reaching a cloverleaf interchange with US 322 that provides access to the Commodore Barry Bridge. At this point, a freeway section of US 130 begins. The freeway heads east to its first interchange after US 322, a right-in/right-out at Barker Avenue, with an overpass just to the west at Springers Road. Barker Avenue leads east to the south end of Route 44. The next interchange provides direct access to Route 44. After Route 44, the route passes over Conrail Shared Assets Operations' Penns Grove Secondary railroad line. Following this, the highway has an interchange with Cedar Swamp Road before US 130 merges into Interstate 295 for a concurrency.

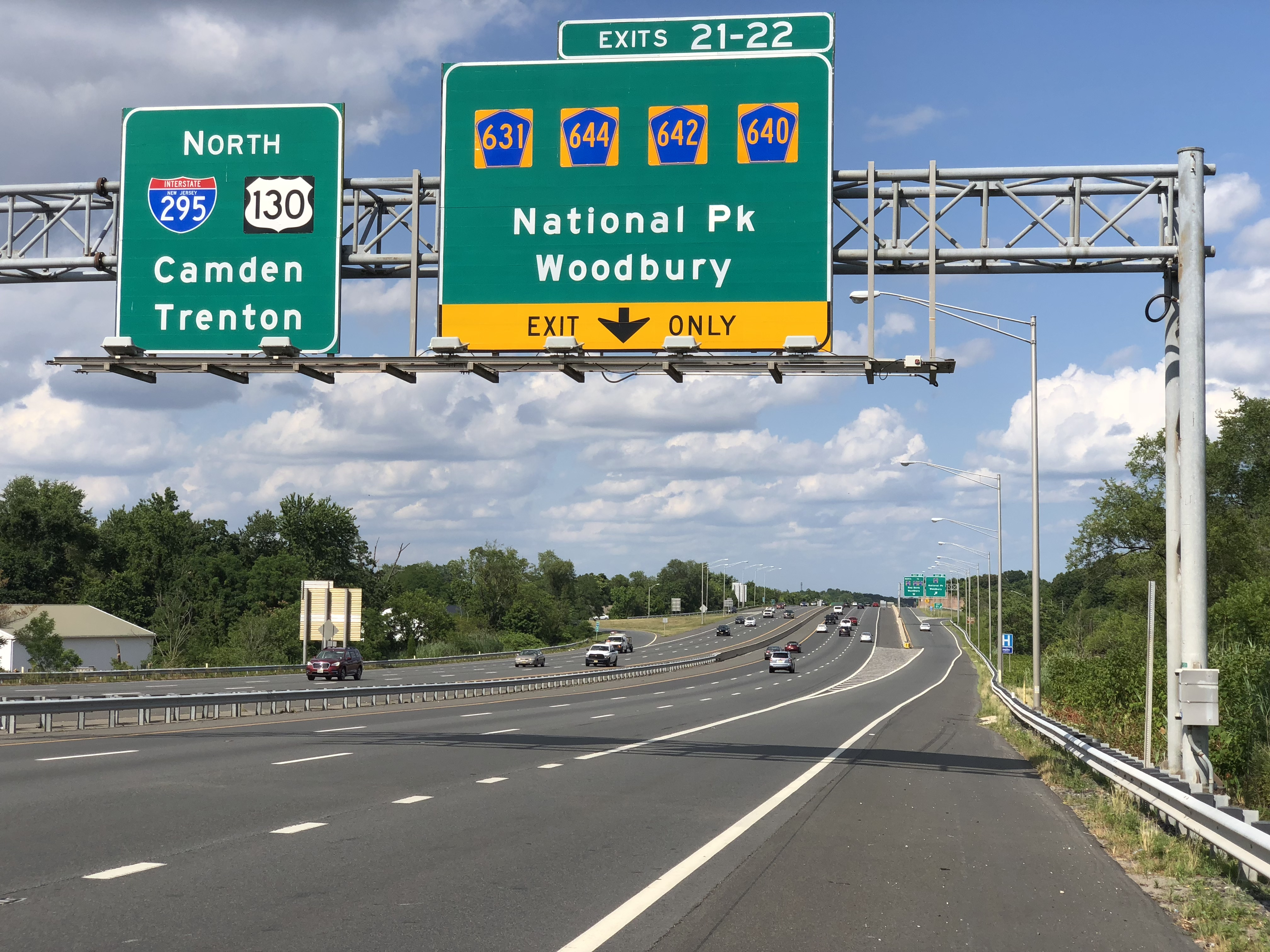
Interstate 295/US 130 northbound at the CR 631/CR 640/CR 642/CR 644 exit in West Deptford Township

Along Interstate 295, the route is a six-lane freeway, coming to an exit for Repaupo Station Road (CR 684). Continuing east, the freeway crosses into Greenwich Township and has an interchange with Tomlin Station Road (CR 607). After passing near Greenwich Lake, there are exits for Paulsboro-Swedesboro Road (CR 653) and Democrat Road (CR 673) within a short distance of each other. Interstate 295/US 130 reaches an interchange with Harmony Road (CR 680) on the border of Greenwich Township and East Greenwich Township. The road runs through a portion of East Greenwich Township before crossing back into Greenwich Township and coming to an interchange with Berkley Road (CR 678) and Cohawkin Road (CR 667) on the border of Greenwich Township and Paulsboro. Past this point, the freeway runs through marshy areas of Mantua Creek and continues into West Deptford Township. Here, there is an exit for Mantua Grove Road (CR 656). Passing near more industrial areas, Interstate 295/US 130 has an interchange with Mid-Atlantic Parkway, which provides access to Route 44 as well as to Grove Street (CR 643) and Jessup Road (CR 660). Continuing northeast, the freeway passes over Conrail Shared Assets Operations' Penns Grove Secondary and reaches an interchange with Route 44 and Delaware Street (CR 640). At this point, Route 44 begins to parallel Interstate 295/US 130 on its northwest side as the two roads cross the Woodbury Creek. Route 44 ends at a cul-de-sac that has a ramp from the southbound direction of Interstate 295/US 130 prior to another interchange that provides access to Red Bank Avenue (CR 644). The freeway passes near some homes before US 130 splits from Interstate 295.

After splitting from Interstate 295, US 130 continues northeast as a four-lane divided road called Crown Point Road. The route runs past an oil refinery before forming the border between West Deptford to the north and Westville to the south, where it begins to pass residences along the south side of the road. The road fully enters Westville before encountering Gateway Boulevard (Route 45) at a southbound exit and northbound entrance. Past this interchange, the lanes of US 130 split briefly before rejoining.

=== Camden County ===
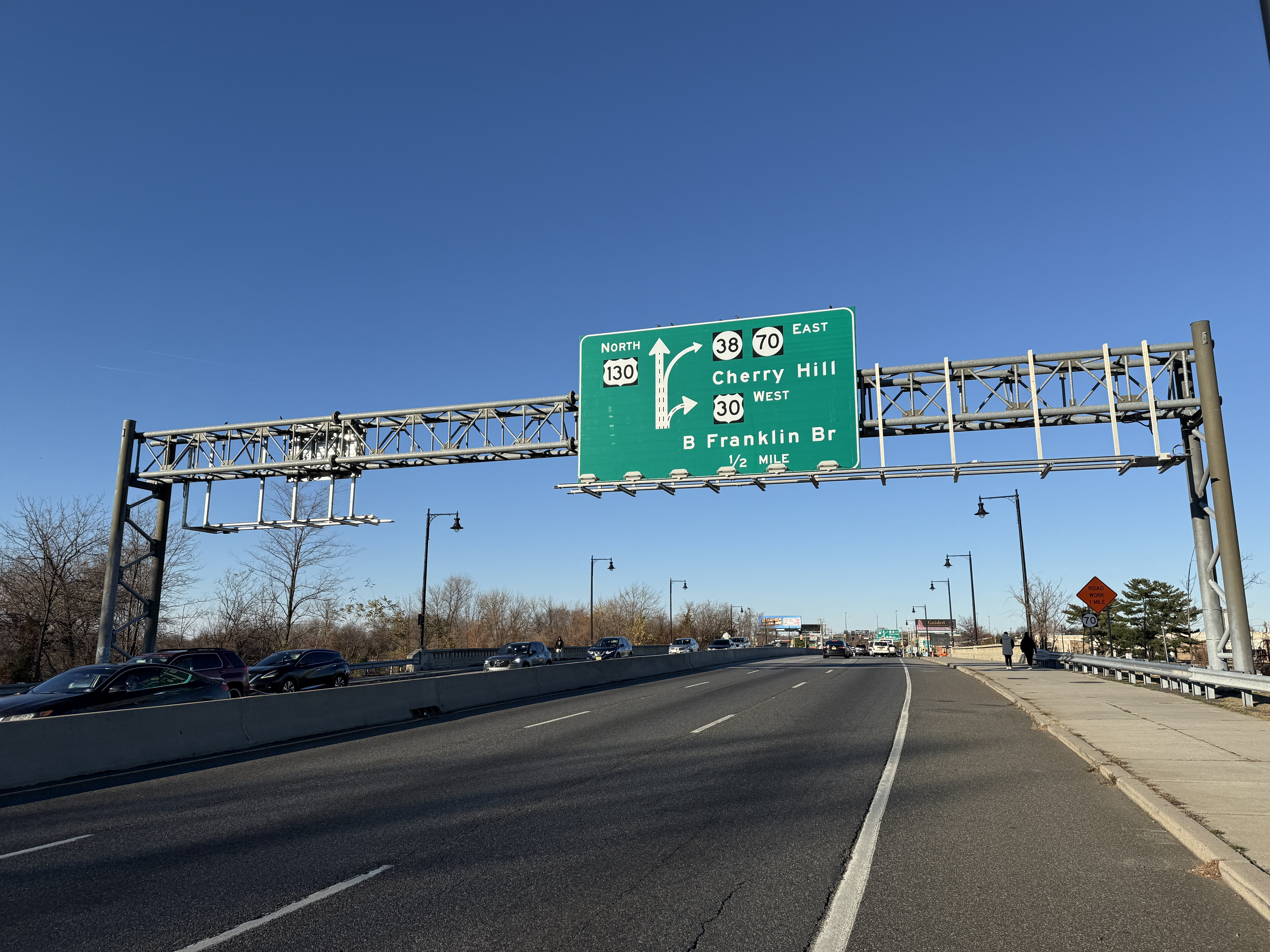
US 30 westbound and US 130 northbound in Camden approaching the Airport Circle in Pennsauken

Upon crossing the Big Timber Creek, the route enters Brooklawn, Camden County, where the name becomes Crescent Boulevard and intersects with Broadway (CR 551) where it comes to a traffic circle. Here, US 130 and CR 551 head concurrent to the east, passing under Conrail Shared Assets Operations' Vineland Secondary railroad line, and come to another traffic circle. At this circle, Route 47 and CR 551 head south on Broadway while US 130 continues east on Crescent Boulevard, lined with suburban shopping centers. After Kings Highway (CR 551 Spur) heads east, US 130 makes a turn to the northeast, widening into a six-lane highway with many intersections controlled by jughandles and crossing the Little Timber Creek into Gloucester City. In Gloucester City, the median of the route widens as it interchanges with Interstate 76 at a partial interchange. From this interchange, the road continues north-northeast heads across Conrail Shared Assets Operations' Grenloch Industrial Track line and crosses the Newton Creek into Haddon Township. US 130 comes to an interchange with Route 76C that has access towards Interstate 76, Interstate 676, and the Walt Whitman Bridge to and from the northbound direction of US 130. The highway continues to a channelized intersection of Mount Ephraim Avenue / Black Horse Pike (Route 168). Following this intersection, US 130 continues through urban areas, passing through a small corner of Camden before entering Collingswood as it crosses under Conrail Shared Assets Operations' Beesleys Point Secondary railroad line. In Collingswood, the road is lined with suburban businesses again prior to meeting the intersection of White Horse Pike (U.S. Route 30) at the former Collingswood Circle.

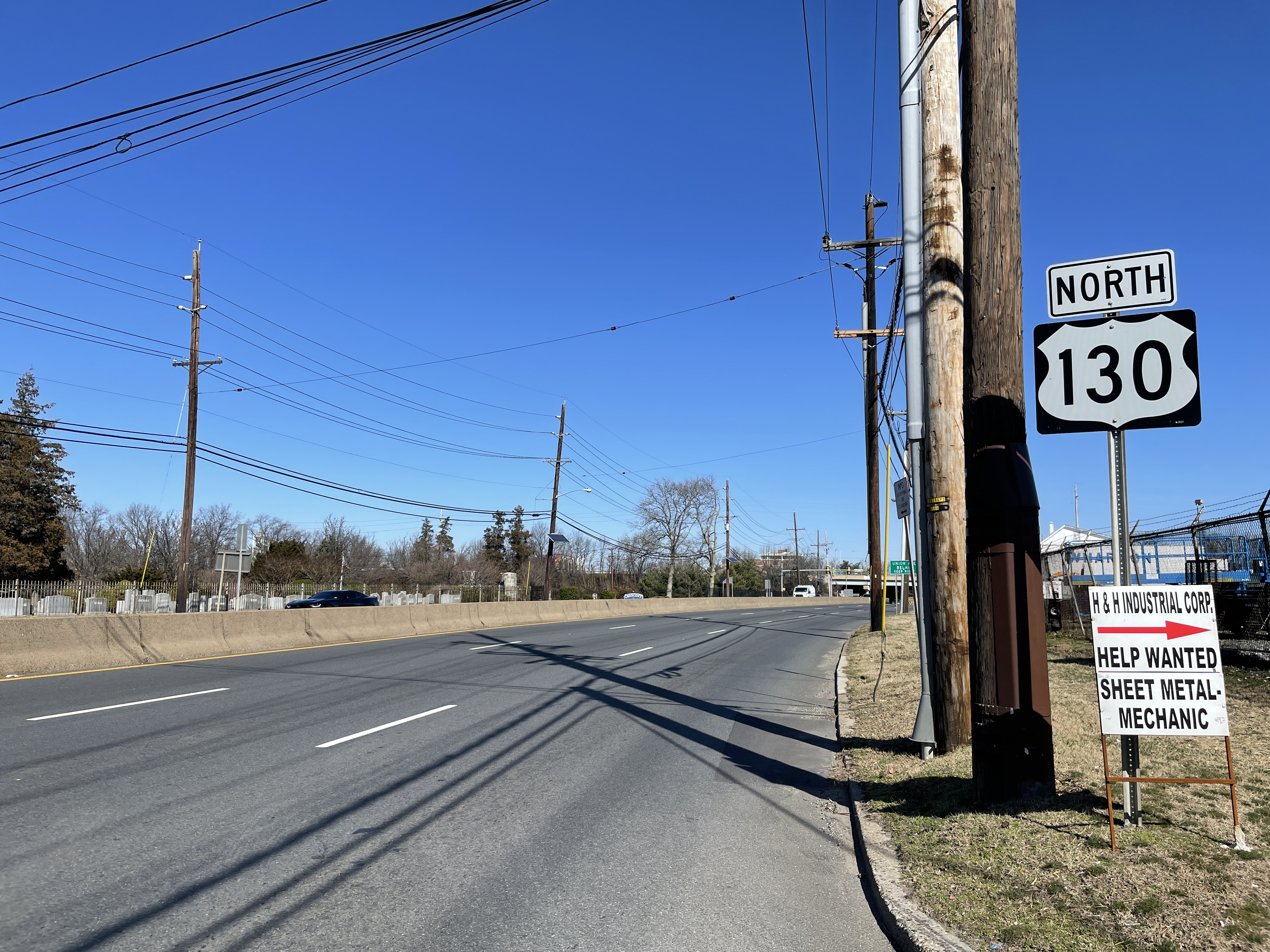
US 130 northbound past CR 610 in Pennsauken Township

At this point, U.S. Route 30 forms a concurrency with US 130 and the two routes head north, passing under the PATCO Speedline before meeting Haddon Avenue (CR 561) at an interchange. Past Haddon Avenue (CR 561), the road passes to the east of Harleigh Cemetery prior to crossing the Cooper River into Pennsauken Township. In Pennsauken, U.S. Route 30/US 130 comes to the Airport Circle. Airport Circle is an intersection with several flyovers; U.S. Route 30 splits to the west, while Route 38 heads east, soon splitting with Route 70. US 130, meanwhile, continues northeast through more commercial areas. The road briefly enters Camden again right before an interchange with Federal Street/Maple Avenue (CR 537) in Pennsauken, passing under an abandoned railroad line a short distance later. The route crosses under NJ Transit’s Atlantic City Line before coming to a large interchange with Route 90 that provides access to the Betsy Ross Bridge. Within this interchange, the lanes of US 130 split. A short distance later, the route reaches an interchange with Route 73, which runs to the Tacony–Palmyra Bridge.

=== Burlington County ===
A short distance after the Route 73 interchange, US 130 crosses North Branch of Pennsauken Creek into Cinnaminson Township, Burlington County, and continues northeast. The route turns to the east-northeast and enters Delran Township, where there is an interchange with Bridgeboro Street (CR 613). Immediately after this interchange, the road crosses the Rancocas Creek and forms the border between Delanco to the northwest and Willingboro Township to the southeast as it passes a couple of lakes. US 130 continues along the border of Edgewater Park and Willingboro. After briefly forming the border between Burlington Township and Willingboro, the road entirely enters Burlington Township and intersects with Beverly Road (CR 543). The route forms a concurrency with CR 543 prior to entering Burlington. A bypass takes US 130 and CR 543 around the downtown area of Burlington. The road comes to an intersection of Keim Boulevard (Route 413), which provides access to the Burlington–Bristol Bridge. Past this intersection, US 130/CR 543 turns east, with the median widening to include businesses. Along this portion of road, there is an intersection of High Street (CR 541). The six-lane section of US 130 decreases to four lanes as it crosses Assicunk Creek, where the median also narrows. The road turns northeast into a residential area, and CR 543 splits from US 130 by heading to the east on Columbus Road.

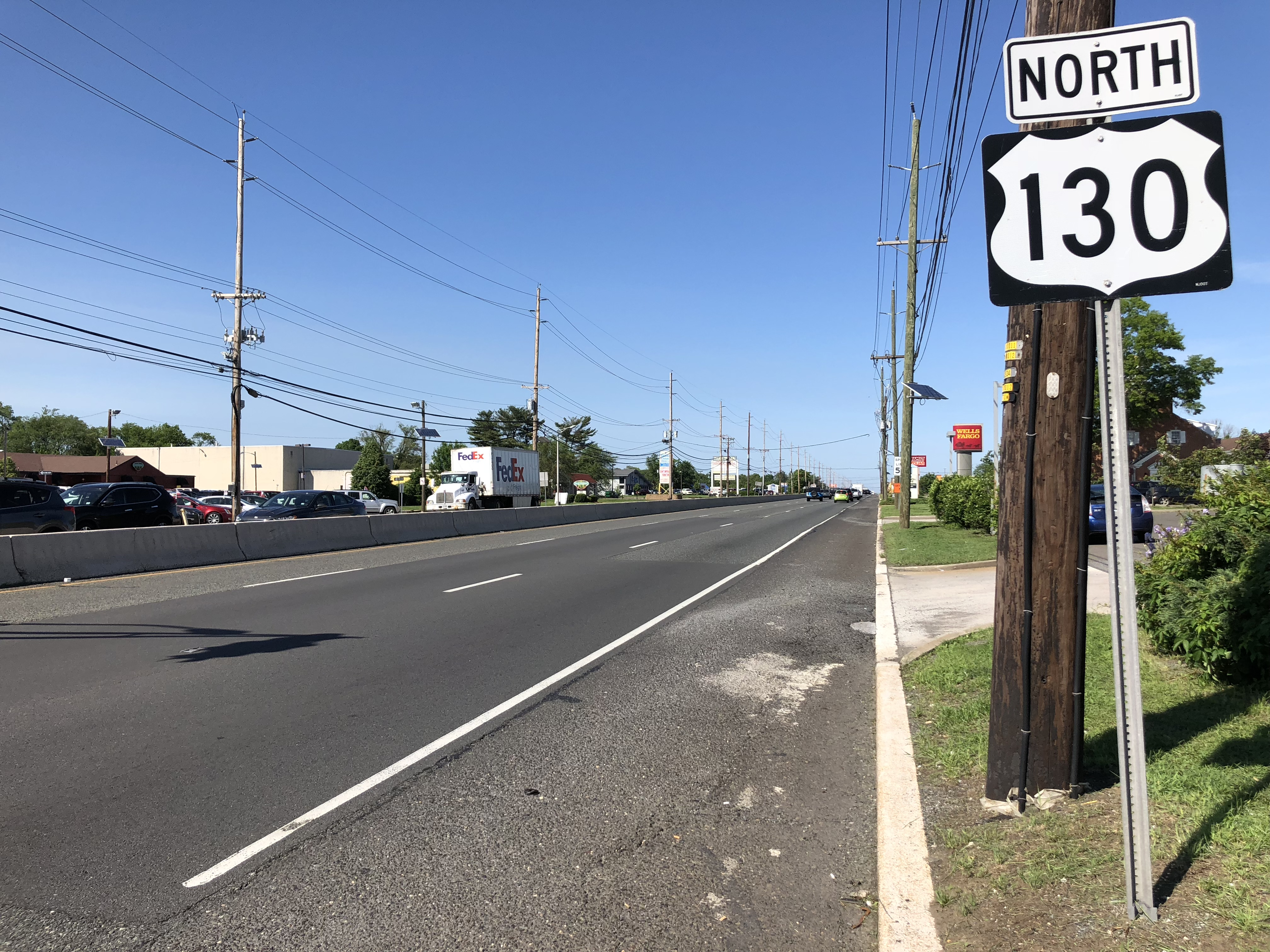
US 130 northbound past CR 630 in Willingboro Township

Past this intersection, US 130 passes some businesses and crosses back into Burlington Township, where it runs a short distance to the southeast of NJ Transit's River Line. The road enters less dense commercial and industrial development, along with some farmland and woodland, as it continues into Florence Township. The route reaches a double trumpet interchange with the Pearl Harbor Memorial Extension of the New Jersey Turnpike (Interstate 95) in Florence Township. Following this interchange, US 130 continues through development before crossing Crafts Creek into Mansfield Township Here, the surroundings become more wooded with a few areas of agriculture. The route continues into Bordentown Township, where the road widens to six lanes as it has a partial cloverleaf interchange with Interstate 295. From this point, US 130 continues to an intersection of Farnsworth Avenue (CR 545), where it narrows back to four lanes. The surroundings become more developed as US 130 merges with US 206 at an interchange, bypassing Bordentown to the east. The two routes continue north on a six-lane divided highway, briefly skirting the eastern edge of Bordentown as the road crosses the intersection of Crosswicks Street/Crosswicks Road (CR 528). After entering Bordentown Township again, US 130 splits from US 206 by heading to the northeast at an interchange. Upon splitting, the route becomes a four-lane divided highway again, passing homes and businesses with areas of woods.

=== Mercer and Middlesex counties ===
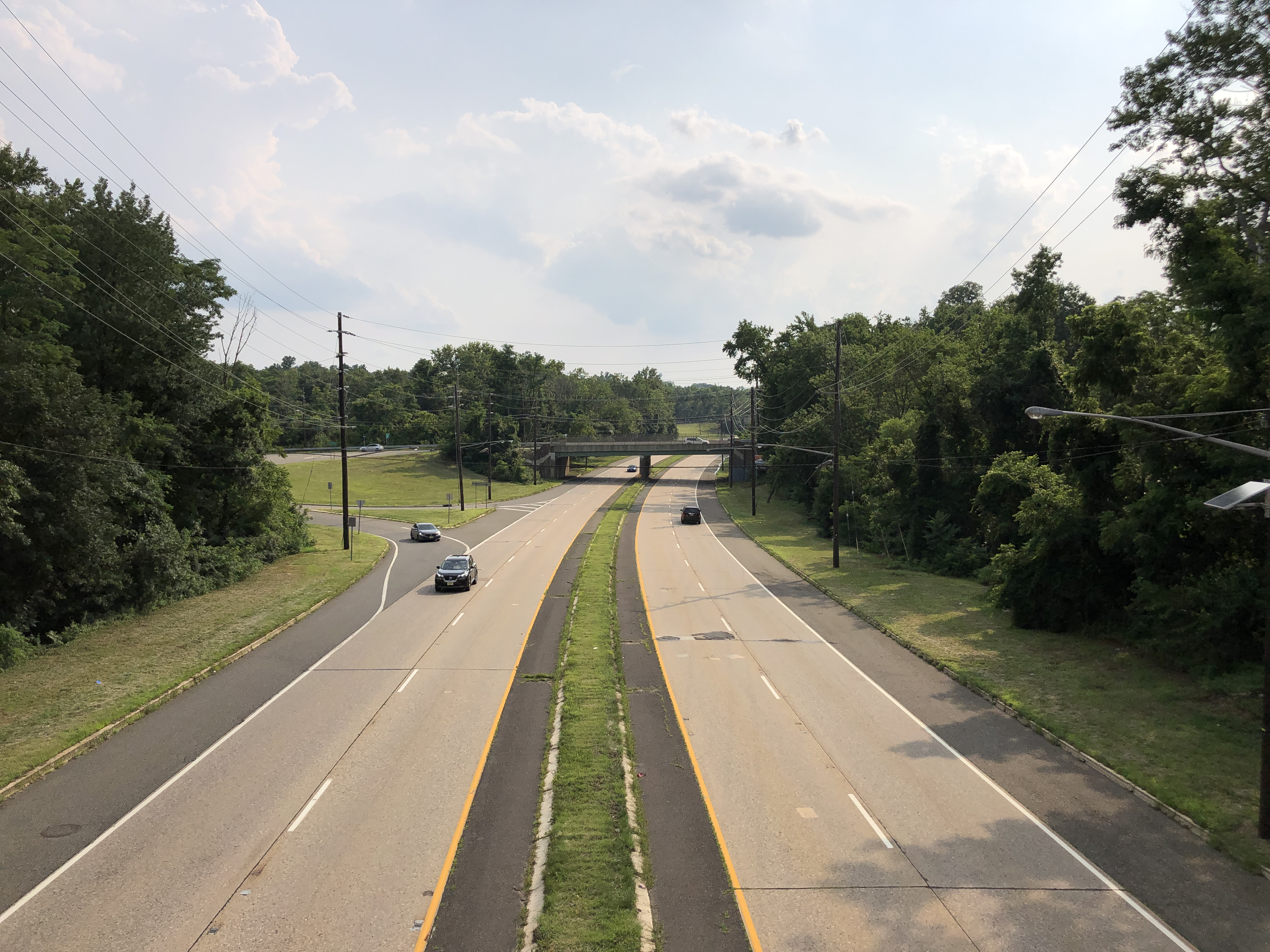
US 130 heading southbound in Hamilton Township

After crossing the Crosswicks Creek, US 130 continues into Hamilton, Mercer County, where Route 156 splits to the west to parallel US 130 as it bypasses Yardville to the east. The route intersects several roads at northbound-only interchanges, including Church Street (CR 609), South Broad Street (CR 672), and Yardville-Allentown Road (CR 524); Route 156 provides southbound access. Past these interchanges, the road passes some homes before Route 156 merges back into it. From this point, US 130 runs through commercial areas, where it has a brief six-lane segment prior to reaching a cloverleaf interchange with Interstate 195. Following this interchange, the road enters Robbinsville Township and intersects with Robbinsville-Allentown Road (CR 526). In Robbinsville, the route forms a short concurrency with CR 526. At the point CR 526 turns east on Robbinsville By-Pass, Route 33 joins US 130 from the west. US 130 and Route 33 run together through rural areas with some development. The road bypasses Windsor to the east prior to entering East Windsor. Here, the road widens to six lanes and Route 33 splits from US 130, heading east into Hightstown. US 130 narrows back to four lanes and runs around the commercial west side of Hightstown, crossing the intersection of Princeton-Hightstown Road/Stockton Street (CR 571). Shortly after this intersection, the route has a partial cloverleaf interchange with Route 133.

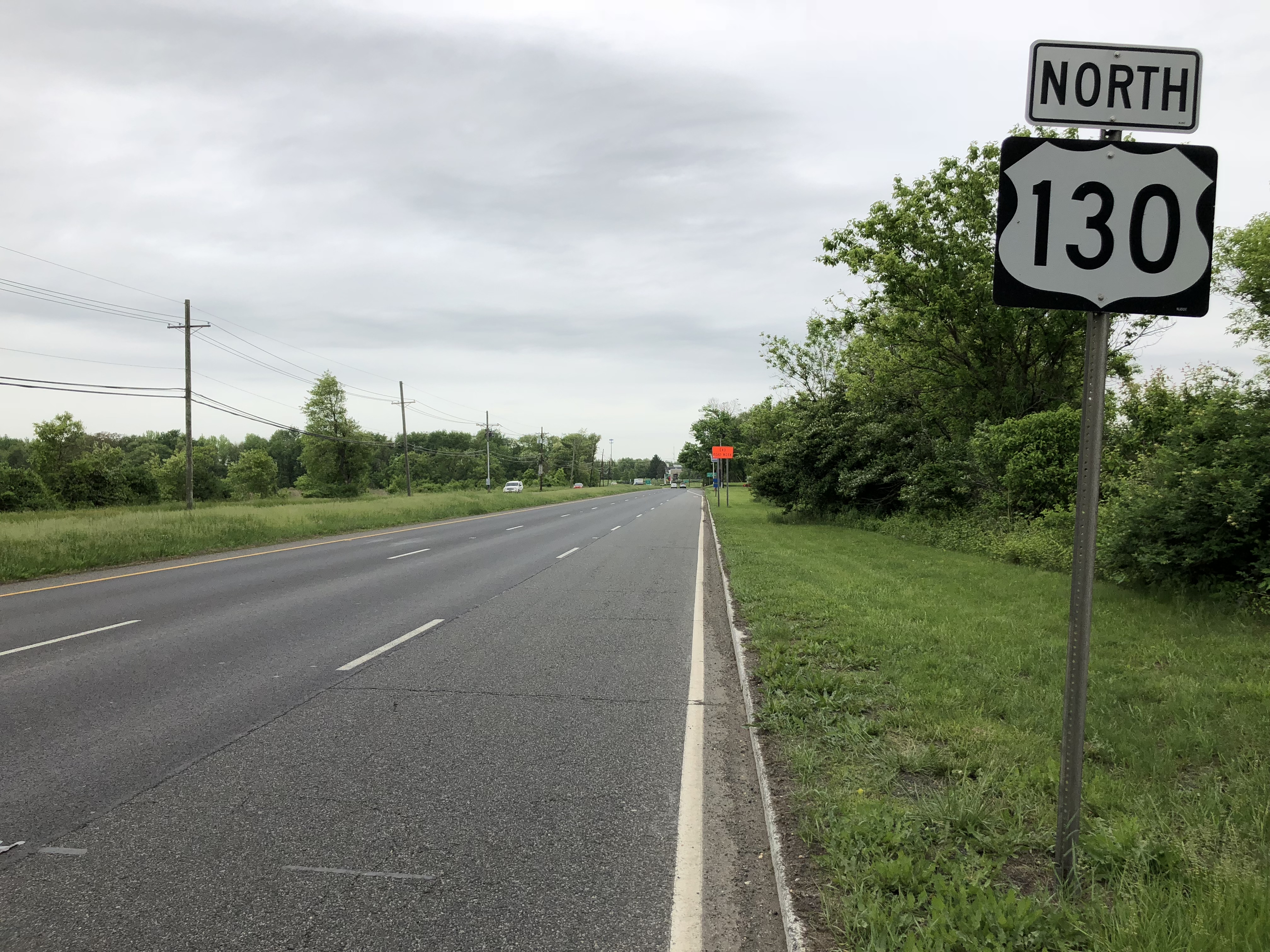
US 130 northbound past Route 32 in South Brunswick

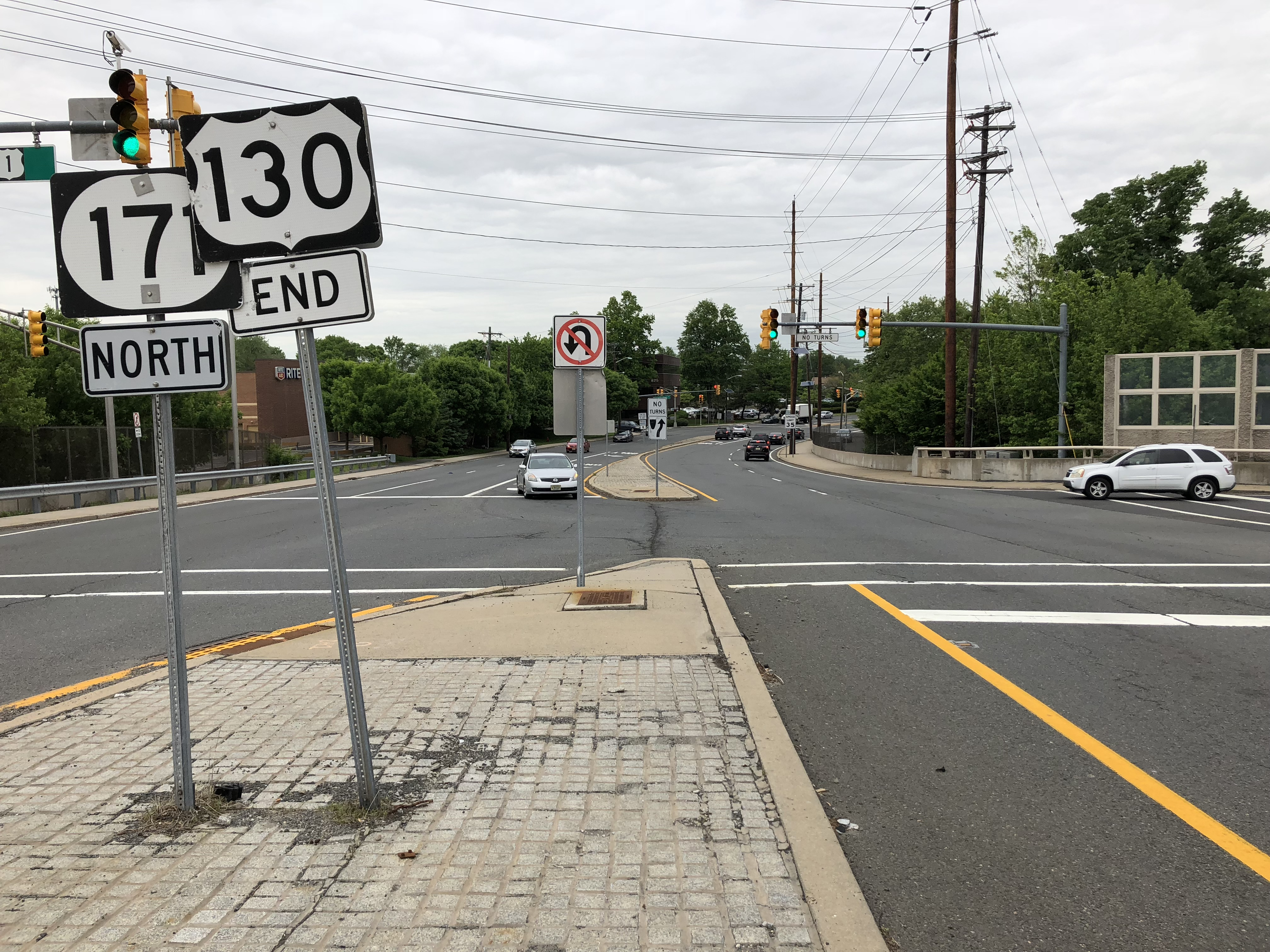
US 130 northbound ends and becomes Route 171 at the interchange with US 1 in North Brunswick

US 130 crosses the Millstone River into Cranbury, Middlesex County, where it has an intersection of North Main Street (CR 539). From this point, the route heads north through a mix of rural surroundings and inhabited neighborhoods, bypassing Downtown Cranbury to the east and crossing the intersection of Station Road (CR 615). Past this intersection, the road continues into development, crossing the Brainerd Lake and intersects with Half Acre Road (CR 535). US 130 forms a short concurrency with CR 535 and splits from US 130 by turning northeast on South River Road. US 130 briefly forms the border between South Brunswick to the west and Cranbury to the east before fully entering South Brunswick as the road runs through a mix of rural areas and business parks. The road comes to a directional Y-intersection with the western terminus of Route 32, which provides access to the New Jersey Turnpike and Monroe Township. A park and ride lot serving Coach USA buses to New York City is located west of this intersection. Following Route 32, US 130 crosses over Conrail Shared Assets Operations' Amboy Secondary railroad line before coming to an interchange with Ridge Road (CR 522). At this point, CR 522 forms a brief concurrency with US 130 before splitting to the west. After the concurrency with CR 522, the route continues north into mostly forested areas, crossing the Davidsons Mill Pond before continuing into North Brunswick. In North Brunswick, the road heads northeast through increasing development as the route starts to turn more to the north. US 130 comes to an end at an interchange with US 1, where the road continues north as Route 171, known as Georges Road into New Brunswick.

== History ==
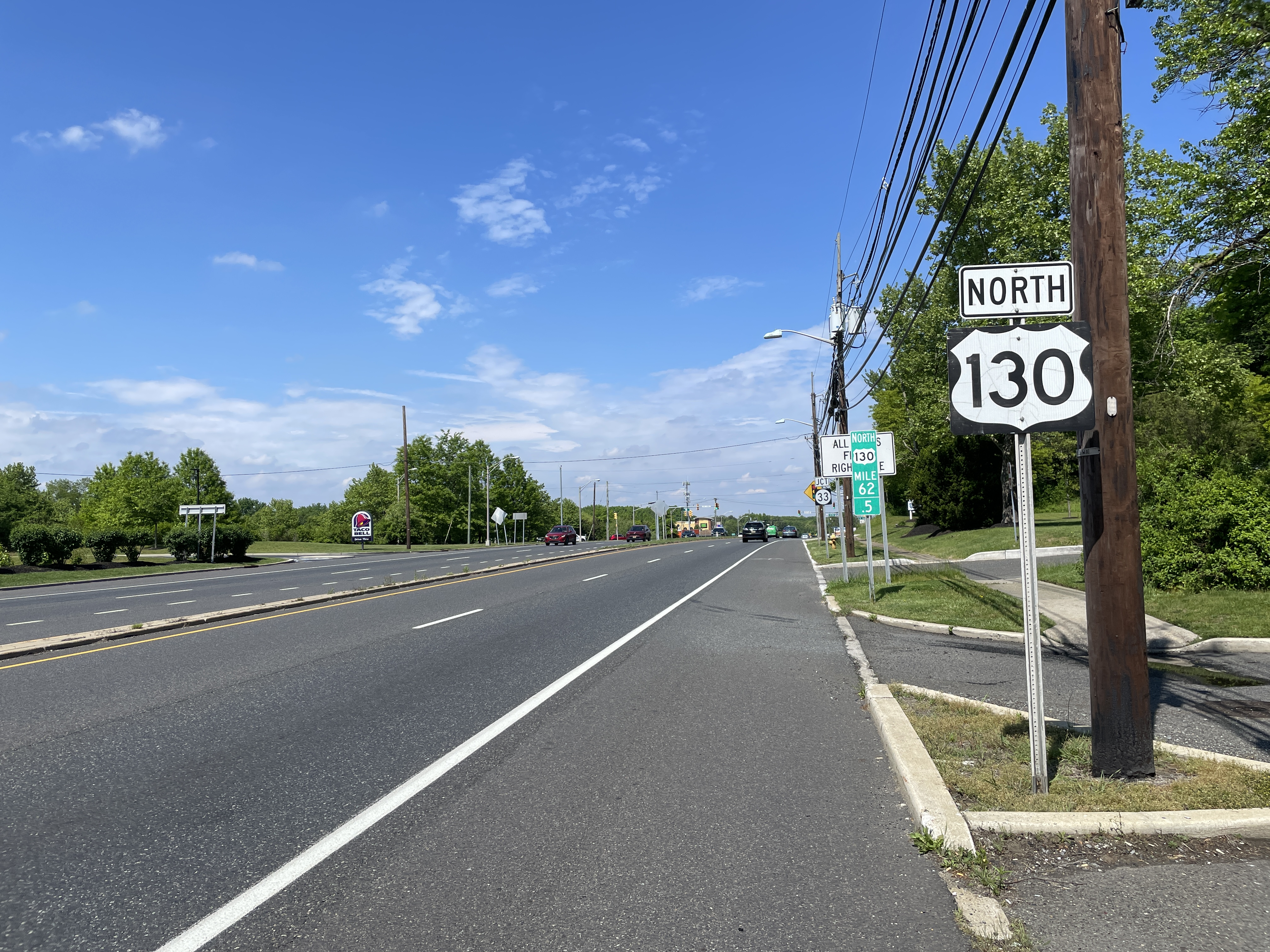
US 130 northbound past CR 526 in Robbinsville Township

What is now US 130 was a part of two Lenape trails: the Pensaukin Trail, running from what is now Camden to Crosswicks; and the Lower Assunpink or Crosswicksung Trail, running from there north to Ahandewamock Village, near modern-day New Brunswick. The section of this trail between Crosswicks and Cranbury became part of a Kings Highway connecting South Amboy and Salem. North of Cranbury, the Assunpink trail was later called the Lower Road, then George's Road. The route was incorporated into several turnpikes in the 19th century. In 1808, the Burlington Turnpike was chartered to run from Burlington north to the Trenton and New Brunswick Turnpike through Bordentown. The Bordentown and South Amboy Turnpike was chartered in 1818 to run from Bordentown to South Amboy, bypassing the Kings Highway from East Brunswick to Cranbury. In 1849 the Westfield and Camden Turnpike was legislated along the Burlington Road from Camden to the bridge at Rancocas Creek. The New Brunswick and Cranbury Turnpike was chartered in 1865 to run from the Bordentown-South Amboy Turnpike to New Brunswick along the old Georges Road.

The entire length of US 130 follows a part of the Ocean Highway, a coastal highway that ran from New Brunswick south to Jacksonville, Florida. The stretch from New Brunswick to Robbinsville was signed as the Cranbury Trail, an alternative to the Lincoln Highway running from New Brunswick to Trenton. The current route was designated as portions of three state routes prior to 1927. In 1916, the road between the Camden area and Bordentown was legislated as part of pre-1927 Route 2 while the current US 130 north of Robbinsville was to become a part of pre-1927 Route 1. In addition, pre-1927 Route 17S was legislated to run from Penns Grove northeast to Westville in 1923; the only portion of road built ran from Pennsville Township south to Salem. When the U.S. Highway System was established in 1926, US 130 was designated to connect U.S. Route 30 in Camden to US 1 in Trenton, following pre-1927 Route 2. In the 1927 renumbering a year later, the US 130 alignment was designated Route 25 from Camden to Bordentown, Route 39 from Bordentown to White Horse, and Route 37 from White Horse to Trenton.

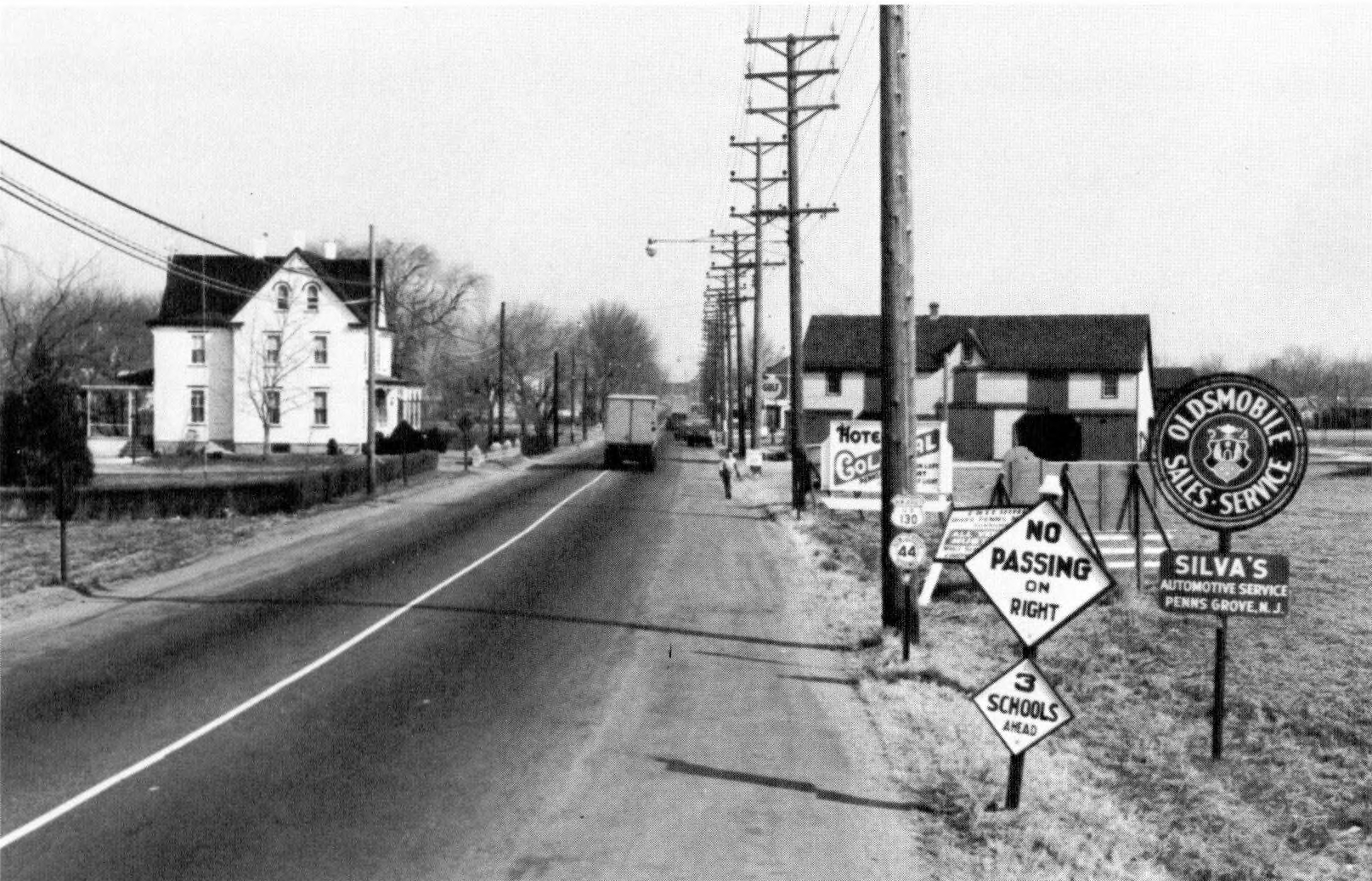
US 130 concurrent with Route 44 in Carneys Point Township prior to the 1953 removal of Route 44 from this section of road

By 1938, US 130 was extended south along Route 45 and Route 44 to end at US 40 in Pennsville where the connection to Hook Road now hits Route 49. By the 1940s, it was rerouted to follow Route 25 and Route 25M from Bordentown to Route 27 in New Brunswick The former US 130 between Bordentown and Trenton was designated as a part of US 206. During the 1940s, a new alignment for US 130 was built through South Brunswick. After the Delaware Memorial Bridge opened in 1951, the south end of US 130 was moved to its current location. Shortly before the 1953 New Jersey state highway renumbering, US 130 was aligned to bypass Yardville with the old route becoming Route 156 in 1953. Also, prior to 1953, US 130 had been aligned to bypass Carneys Point and a stretch of Route 44 between Bridgeport and Westville.

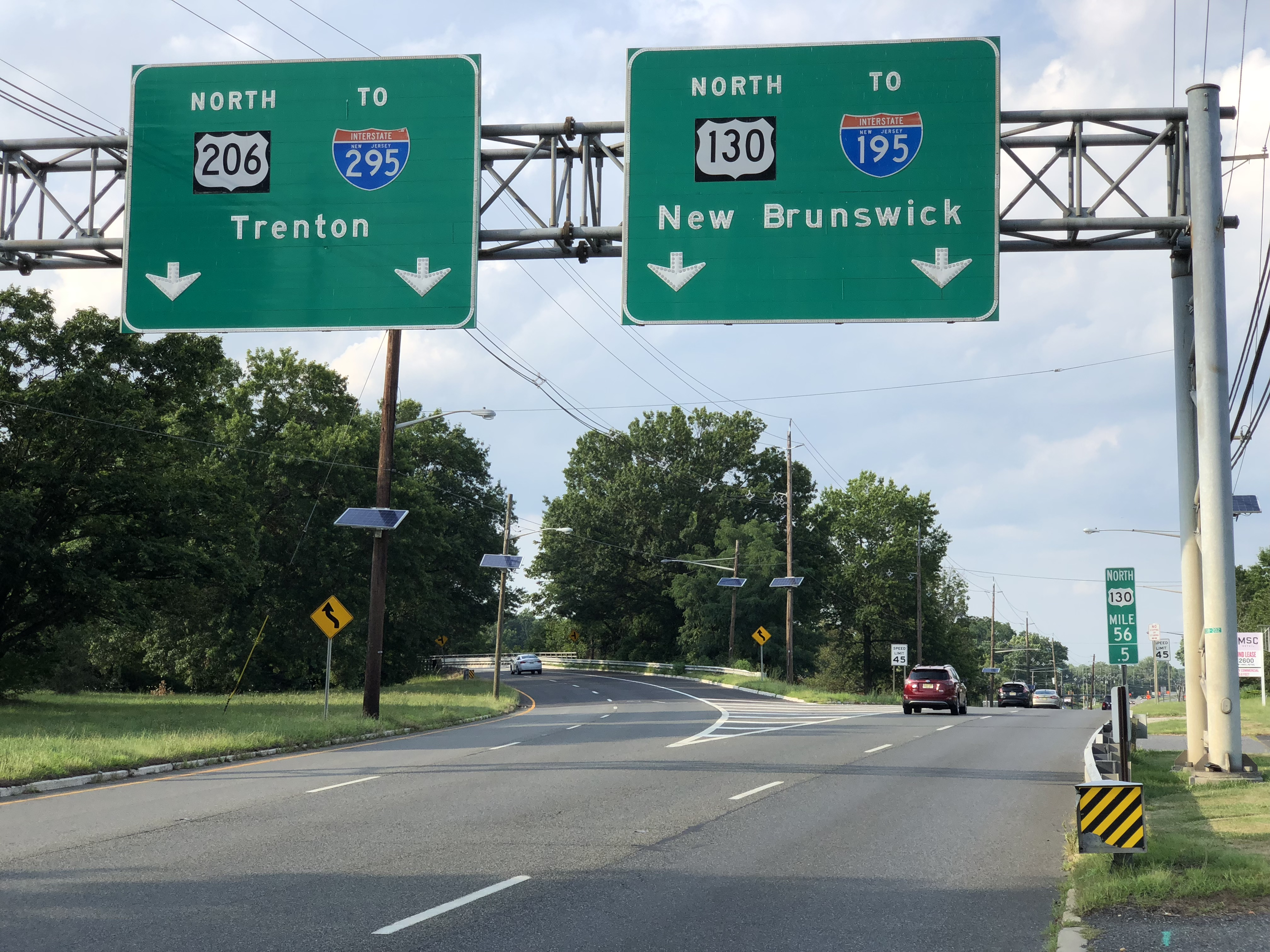
US 130 northbound at split with US 206 in Bordentown Township

In the 1953 renumbering, US 130 replaced Route 44 and parts of Route 45 and Route 25, as well as the short Route 25M into New Brunswick. With the 1953 renumbering freeing up the Route 44 designation, that number was eventually assigned to the two sections of old road. In the 1960s, Interstate 295 was built through Salem and Gloucester counties, following a portion of the US 130 freeway bypass of Carneys Point as well as the freeway portion of the route from north of Bridgeport to Westville. As a result of this construction, US 130 was moved back to its original alignment in Carneys Point, replacing that portion of Route 44. US 130 was cut back to its current north end at US 1 in 1969, and the continuation into New Brunswick was assigned Route 171.

In the late 1960s, a freeway was proposed by the Delaware Valley Regional Planning Commission to alleviate traffic on US 130 between Camden and Burlington. This freeway was originally planned as a parkway between the two cities in 1932 that never materialized. The proposed freeway, which was to connect the Ben Franklin Bridge to Interstate 295 near the Assicunk Creek, was to cost $53 million and mostly follow a Conrail railroad line between the two cities. However, the NJDOT never followed through with the proposal.

Construction in 2001 replaced a modified traffic circle at US 130's northern terminus at US 1 and Route 171 in North Brunswick with an interchange. A service road was also built to serve the nearby shopping centers and Milltown Road (CR 606). This project was completed in July 2003. In 2009, the Collingswood Circle at the southern terminus of the U.S. Route 30 concurrency was replaced with an at-grade intersection with jughandles.

In 2013 the road was one of three that tied for the #1 ranking on the Tri-State Transportation Campaign's list of the top ten most dangerous roads for pedestrians in New Jersey, New York and Connecticut. The route, along with US 40/US 322 in Atlantic County and US 1 in Middlesex County, were so ranked due to the nine pedestrian deaths that occurred on each of those roads from 2009 to 2011.

== Major intersections ==
County	Location	mi	km	Exit	Destinations	Notes
Salem	Pennsville Township	0.0	0.0		Route 49 east (Broadway) – Salem	Continuation east
Salem	Pennsville Township	0.0	0.0		I-295 / N.J. Turnpike / US 40 – Trenton, Atlantic City, Delaware Memorial Bridge	Exit 1B on I-295 / Turnpike; no southbound access to I-295 north/NJTP north
Salem	Carneys Point Township	0.5	0.80		Route 140 east / CR 540 east (Hawks Bridge Road) to N.J. Turnpike north / US 40 east / CR 551 – Salem	Western terminus of Route 140/CR 540
Salem	Penns Grove	3.6	5.8		Route 48 east (East Main Street)	Western terminus of Route 48
Gloucester	Logan Township			Southern end of freeway section		
Gloucester	Logan Township	12.2	19.6		US 322 – Glassboro, Commodore Barry Bridge, Pennsylvania	
Gloucester	Logan Township	12.6	20.3		Barker Avenue	
Gloucester	Logan Township	13.4	21.6		Route 44 – Gibbstown, Bridgeport	
Gloucester	Logan Township	13.49	21.71		Cedar Swamp Road	
Gloucester	Logan Township	14.2	22.9		I-295 south – Delaware Memorial Bridge, Delaware	Southern end of I-295 concurrency; southbound exit and northbound entrance
Gloucester	Logan Township	14.5	23.3	14	CR 684 to Route 44 – Repaupo, Gibbstown	
Gloucester	Greenwich Township	15.4	24.8	15	CR 607 – Gibbstown, Harrisonville	
Gloucester	Greenwich Township	16.0	25.7	16A	CR 653 – Swedesboro, Paulsboro	
Gloucester	Greenwich Township	16.4	26.4	16B	CR 673 – Gibbstown, Mickleton	
Gloucester	Greenwich Township	17.2	27.7	17	To CR 680 – Gibbstown	Access via Swedesboro Avenue
Gloucester	Paulsboro	18.3– 18.4	29.5– 29.6	18	CR 667 / CR 678 – Paulsboro, Mt Royal, Clarksboro	
Gloucester	West Deptford Township	19.4	31.2	19	CR 656 to Route 44 – Mantua Township, Paulsboro	
Gloucester	West Deptford Township	20.6	33.2	20	To Route 44 / CR 643 / CR 660 – Mantua Township, Thorofare, Woodbury	
Gloucester	West Deptford Township	21.8	35.1	21	Route 44 south / CR 640 – National Park, Paulsboro, Woodbury	
Gloucester	West Deptford Township	22.9	36.9	22	CR 631 / CR 644 to CR 642 – Red Bank, Woodbury	
Gloucester	West Deptford Township	23.6	38.0		I-295 north – Camden, Trenton	Northern end of I-295 concurrency
Gloucester	West Deptford Township	23.6	38.0	Northern end of freeway section		
Gloucester	Westville	25.1	40.4		Route 45 south (Gateway Blvd) – Woodbury	Southbound exit and northbound entrance; northern terminus of Route 45
Camden	Brooklawn	25.5	41.0		CR 551 north (Broadway)	Brooklawn West Circle; southern end of CR 551 concurrency
Camden	Brooklawn	25.74	41.42		Route 47 south / CR 551 south (Broadway)	Brooklawn East Circle; northern end of CR 551 concurrency; northern terminus of Route 47
Camden	Brooklawn	26.1	42.0		CR 551 Spur north (Kings Highway)	Southern terminus of CR 551 Spur
Camden	Gloucester City	27.1	43.6		I-76 to I-295 / Route 42 south – Walt Whitman Bridge, Benjamin Franklin Bridge, Atlantic City, Trenton, Delaware Memorial Bridge	Exits 1C-D on I-76
Camden	Haddon Township	28.1	45.2		To I-76 Toll west (Walt Whitman Bridge) / I-676 north – Philadelphia	Interchange; access via Route 76C; southbound exit and northbound entrance
Camden	Haddon Township	28.3	45.5		Route 168 (Mount Ephraim Ave/Black Horse Pike) – Mount Ephraim, Camden	
Camden	Collingswood	29.4	47.3		US 30 east / CR 606 west (White Horse Pike) – Collingswood, Berlin, Woodlynne	Former Collingswood Circle; southern end of US 30 concurrency; eastern terminus of CR 606
Camden	Collingswood	29.8	48.0		CR 561 – Collingswood, Camden	Interchange
Camden	Pennsauken Township	30.4	48.9		US 30 west / Route 38 east to Route 70 east – Camden, Benjamin Franklin Bridge	Airport Circle; northern end of US 30 concurrency; western terminus of Route 38
Camden	Pennsauken Township	32.0	51.5		CR 537 (Maple Avenue) – Merchantville	Interchange
Camden	Pennsauken Township	34.1	54.9		Route 90 to Route 73 / CR 644 – Betsy Ross Bridge, Philadelphia, Maple Shade Township	Interchange
Camden	Pennsauken Township	34.1	54.9		Hylton Road / J Tipton Boulevar to National Highway	Interchange; no northbound entrance
Camden	Pennsauken Township	35.5	57.1		Route 73 to N.J. Turnpike / CR 644 – Tacony-Palmyra Bridge, Haddonfield, Marlton, Atlantic City	Interchange; no northbound access to Route 73 south
Burlington	Delran Township	40.8	65.7		CR 613 – Riverside Township, Bridgeboro, Moorestown	Interchange
Burlington	Burlington Township	45.2	72.7		CR 543 south (Beverly Rd) – Edgewater Park	Southern end of CR 543 concurrency
Burlington	Burlington	45.6	73.4		Route 413 west (Keim Blvd) to PA 413 north – Burlington–Bristol Bridge	Eastern terminus of Route 413
Burlington	Burlington	46.1	74.2		CR 541 (High St) to N.J. Turnpike – Mount Holly, Burlington Business Dist	
Burlington	Burlington	47.1	75.8		CR 543 north (Columbus Road) – Columbus	Northern end of CR 543 concurrency
Burlington	Florence Township	50.4	81.1		I-95 Toll / Pearl Harbor Extension to N.J. Turnpike	Exit 6A on I-95 / Turnpike
Burlington	Bordentown Township	54.9	88.4		I-295 – Camden, Trenton	Exit 57 on I-295
Burlington	Bordentown Township	55.4	89.2		CR 545 (Farnsworth Avenue) – Bordentown, Georgetown, Fort Dix	
Burlington	Bordentown Township	55.7– 55.7	89.6– 89.6		US 206 south to I-95 Toll / N.J. Turnpike – Hammonton	Interchange; southern end of US 206 concurrency
Burlington	Bordentown	55.9	90.0		CR 528 (Crosswicks Street / Crosswicks Road) – Bordentown, Chesterfield Township, New Egypt	
Burlington	Bordentown Township	56.4– 56.4	90.8– 90.8		US 206 north to I-295 – Trenton	Interchange; northern end of US 206 concurrency
Mercer	Hamilton Township	58.3	93.8		Route 156 north – Yardville, Groveville	Southern terminus of Route 156; former routing of US 130
Mercer	Hamilton Township	58.6	94.3		Yardville, Groveville	Interchange; northbound exit and entrance; access via CR 609
Mercer	Hamilton Township	58.8	94.6		Crosswicks	Interchange; northbound exit and entrance; access via CR 672
Mercer	Hamilton Township	59.0	95.0		CR 524 – Trenton, Allentown	Interchange; northbound exit and entrance
Mercer	Hamilton Township	59.5	95.8		Route 156 south to CR 524 – Yardville, Allentown	Northern terminus of Route 156; former routing of US 130
Mercer	Hamilton Township	61.3	98.7		I-195 to I-95 Toll / N.J. Turnpike – Trenton, Belmar	Exit 5 on I-195
Mercer	Robbinsville Township	62.4	100.4		CR 526 west (Robbinsville-Allentown Road) – Trenton	Southern end of CR 526 concurrency
Mercer	Robbinsville Township	62.6	100.7		Route 33 west / CR 526 east (Robbinsville By-Pass) – Trenton, Allentown	Northern end of CR 526 concurrency; southern end of Route 33 concurrency
Mercer	East Windsor	67.2	108.1		Route 33 east (Mercer Street) to I-95 / N.J. Turnpike – Hightstown, Shore Points	Northern end of Route 33 concurrency
Mercer	East Windsor	68.5	110.2		CR 571 (Princeton-Hightstown Road / Stockton Street) to I-95 Toll / N.J. Turnpike – Princeton, Hightstown	
Mercer	East Windsor	69.3	111.5		Route 133 to I-95 Toll / N.J. Turnpike – Princeton, Freehold Township	Interchange; no northbound access to Route 133 west
Middlesex	Cranbury	70.1	112.8		CR 539 – Cranbury, Hightstown	
Middlesex	Cranbury	71.9	115.7		CR 535 south (Half Acre Road) – Cranbury, Plainsboro Township	Southern end of CR 535 concurrency
Middlesex	Cranbury	72.1	116.0		CR 535 north (South River Road) – Jamesburg	Northern end of CR 535 concurrency
Middlesex	South Brunswick	74.2– 74.5	119.4– 119.9		Route 32 east to I-95 Toll / N.J. Turnpike – Jamesburg	Western terminus of Route 32
Middlesex	South Brunswick	76.1	122.5		CR 522 east (Ridge Road) – Jamesburg, Dayton	Interchange; southern end of CR 522 concurrency
Middlesex	South Brunswick	76.4	123.0		CR 522 west	Northern end of CR 522 concurrency
Middlesex	North Brunswick	83.4	134.2		US 1 – Trenton, Newark	Interchange
Middlesex	North Brunswick	83.4	134.2		Route 171 north – New Brunswick	Continuation north
1.000 mi = 1.609 km; 1.000 km = 0.621 mi: Concurrency terminus; Incomplete access; Tolled
