= Hoopo =

Energy logistics system

hoopo
- Type: Private
- Industry: Machine to Machine, Internet of Things, Wireless
- Founded: 2016
- Founders: Ittay Hayut, Ilan Lozovsky, Daniel Avitzour, Erez Aviv, Menachem Tipris
- Headquarters: Tel Aviv, Israel
- Area served: Global
- Website: www.hoopo.com

hoopo is an energy efficient tracking system that helps companies and institutions to manage airport ground support equipment, supply chain, waste management and transportation logistics using low power wide area networks (LPWA). It was founded in 2016 and is headquartered in Tel Aviv, Israel, with operations in the USA, Europe, and Japan.

== History ==
hoopo Systems was co-founded by Ittay Hayut, Ilan Lozovsky, Daniel Avitzour, Erez Aviv, Menachem Tipris in 2016 as an end-to-end Internet of Things (IoT) tracking geolocation system that helps companies and institutions track valuable assets without significant battery consumption or the cost associated with implementing a GPS tracking system. It is headquartered in Israel, with operations in the USA, Europe and Japan.

It graduated from the Fusion LA accelerator program for Israeli startups in the US in 2017. In January 2018, hoopo received $1.5 million in pre-seed funding from TAU Ventures, Zohar Gilon, Ben Marcus, and others, followed by a $3.5 million seed funding from Chartered Group, TAU Ventures and Global IoT Technology Ventures (GiTV) in June 2019.

== Technology ==
The hoopo technology enables efficient management of business logistics operations and supply chain by creating data visibility across asset locations. The location-based data prevents bottlenecks, enables asset maintenance and real-time tracking through cloud software and interoperable hardware. Edge-embedded algorithms combine with LPWA technologies to choose when and which technology to apply according to the specific use-case and asset behavior.

hoopoSense is a multi-mode tracking device that utilizes several location technologies and LPWA LoRa communication protocols to ensure reliable positioning and long-range connectivity while keeping power consumption to a bare minimum. The hoopoSenceC tracking devices interoperates between LPWA LoRa and cellular communication networks, and are mountable on any powered or unpowered container, generating location tracking and movement reports.

The Mobile Access Point is a miniature access point, either fixed or powered by motorized equipment that creates a low-power, wide-area LoRa infrastructure. It provides connectivity for the hoopoSense trackers mounted on non-powered equipment. The hoopo outdoor gateway is a software-defined gateway which provides long-range connectivity and accurate native-location technology for the hoopoSense or other LoRa devices.
