= Ron Howden (musician) =

Ron Howden (5 January 1945 — 29 September 2023) was a British drummer for Nektar. He was in Nektar 1969 to 1978, and then from 2003 to 2016 when the band split up following the death of singer Roye Albrighton. In 2019, he and original bassist Derek "Mo" Moore formed a new Nektar band in Bordentown, New Jersey until his death in 2023. Nektar's most recent album, Mission to Mars, was recorded before his death and released posthumously in 2024.

== Biography ==
Howden was born in Sheffield. Howden died on 29 September 2023. He had several health problems before including beating cancer in 2016 and had Stage IV Lymphoma as of 2019. He is survived by his wife, Ann, three daughters, and five grandchildren. Nektar bassist, Derek "Mo" Moore, mentioned that he and Howden had toured with each other since 1964.
