= Innovation Pavilion =

- Type: LLC
- Founded: Colorado, United States
- Defunct: 2018
- Headquarters: Centennial, Colorado
- Key people: Vic Ahmed (founder)

Innovation Pavilion is a business incubator founded by Vic Ahmed in Centennial, Colorado in 2011. The incubator describes itself as an ecosystem for entrepreneurs and is modeled after Plug and Play, a Silicon Valley startup incubator. The Pavilion houses member companies in technology, digital health, media, entertainment, marketing and finance, operating from a startup level upward. The incubator has also held several Youth Entrepreneur programs with the Denver Youth Entrepreneurship Network.

The building was purchased in 2013 in a strategic partnership between Innovation Pavilion and Northstar Commercial Partners, with plans to open more incubators. Northstar, a privately held commercial real estate firm, is headquartered in Denver.

The Innovation Pavilion space has been listed for lease amidst allegations of sexual assault were leveled at founder Vic Ahmed.

On November 13, 2019, Thrive Workplace announced they would be opening their fourth location in the space that was once home to Innovation Pavilion.

== Investments ==
As one of their funding mechanisms, Innovation Pavilion offers endorsements to startups on the peer-to-peer microlending platform, Kiva Zip.

== Member companies ==
- Cloud Elements – an API management service that developers use to integrate, monitor and maintain cloud services.
- CLVR – an interactive video company.
