= Interstate 280 (New Jersey) =

Highway in New Jersey

Interstate 280
- Essex Freeway
- I-280 highlighted in red

Route information
- Auxiliary route of I-80
- Maintained by NJDOT and NJTA
- Length: 17.85 mi (28.73 km)
- Existed: 1958–present
- NHS: Entire route

Major junctions
- West end: I-80 in Parsippany–Troy Hills
- G.S. Parkway in East Orange; Route 21 in Newark
- East end: I-95 Toll / N.J. Turnpike in Kearny

Location
- Country: United States
- State: New Jersey
- Counties: Morris, Essex, Hudson

Highway system
- Interstate Highway System; Main; Auxiliary; Suffixed; Business; Future; New Jersey State Highway Routes; Interstate; US; State; Scenic Byways
← I-278	→ Route 284

Interstate 280 (I-280) is a 17.85-mile (28.73 km) Interstate Highway in the U.S. state of New Jersey. It provides a spur from I-80 in Parsippany–Troy Hills, Morris County, east to Newark and I-95 (New Jersey Turnpike) in Kearny, Hudson County. In Kearny, access is provided toward the Holland Tunnel and Lincoln Tunnel to New York City. The western part of the route runs through suburban areas of Morris and Essex counties, crossing the Watchung Mountains. Upon reaching The Oranges, the setting becomes more urbanized and I-280 runs along a depressed alignment before ascending again in Newark. I-280 includes a vertical-lift bridge, the William A. Stickel Memorial Bridge, over the Passaic River between Newark and East Newark/Harrison. The highway is sometimes called the Essex Freeway. I-280 intersects several roads, including the Garden State Parkway in East Orange and Route 21 in Newark.

A part of present-day I-280 in Newark west of the Stickel Bridge was legislated as Route 25A in 1939, a spur of Route 25 (US Route 1/9 [US 1/9]) that was to run from Jersey City west to Newark. This portion of road would become Route 58 in 1953 (the Route 58 designation was removed in the 1990s). When the Interstate Highway System was being planned, the Route 3 freeway was planned to become an Interstate. The New Jersey State Highway Department favored the Essex Freeway instead between Interstate 80 in Parsippany–Troy Hills to Interstate 95 in Kearny. The latter would become the Interstate and be designated I-280. This road was built in the 1960s and completed west from Newark in 1973. The portion east of Newark to the New Jersey Turnpike opened in 1980. I-280 was once planned to continue east to Interstate 78 near the Holland Tunnel but never was extended east of the New Jersey Turnpike. In the 2000s, the Stickel Bridge was reconstructed after the original structure was determined to be structurally deficient.

== Route description ==
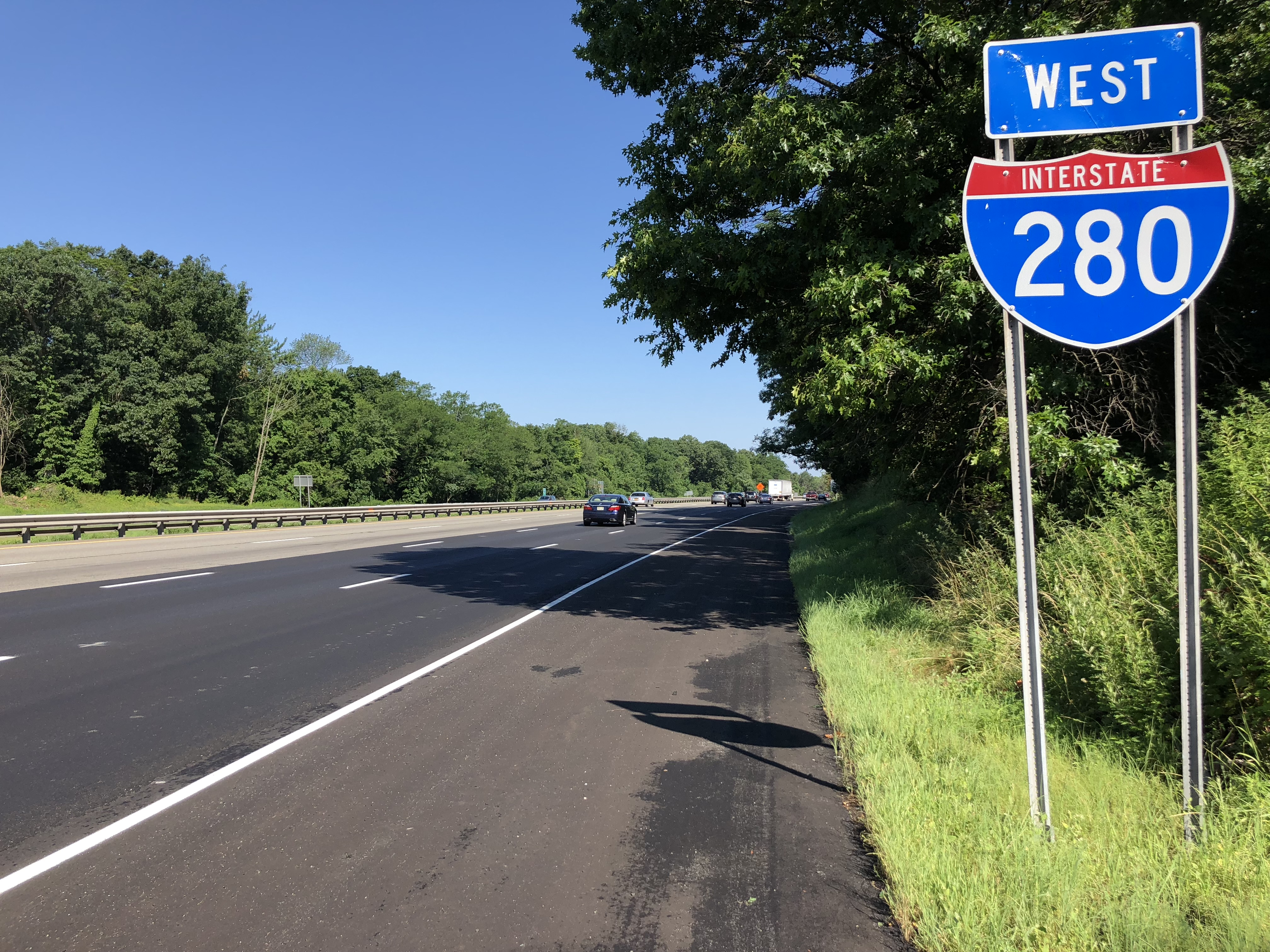
I-280 westbound past CR 527 in Roseland

I-280 begins at the interchange with I-80 and US 46 in Parsippany–Troy Hills, Morris County, and heads southeast into wooded surroundings as a four-lane freeway. The road comes to its first interchange with New Road before crossing the Whippany River into East Hanover Township. The freeway runs near some fields before heading back into woods and entering Roseland, Essex County, at the crossing of the Passaic River. Shortly after the Passaic River, I-280 has a cloverleaf interchange with Eisenhower Parkway (CR 609). At this point, the roadway widens to six lanes and runs near wooded suburban areas, passing over the Morristown and Erie Railway's Whippany Line before reaching CR 527 at another cloverleaf interchange. Past CR 527, I-280 makes a turn to the east before heading southeast into Livingston and interchanging with Laurel Avenue (CR 634). Following this exit, the road enters West Orange and passes through the Second Watchung Mountain in a cut. Past the mountain, the road heads back into suburban areas and comes to the exit for Pleasant Valley Way (CR 636), where the highway widens to eight lanes here and heads east to an interchange with Prospect Avenue (CR 577). After Prospect Avenue (CR 577), I-280 makes a sharp turn to the south and goes through the First Watchung Mountain in another cut, resuming into suburbs again and heading south-southeast as it intersects Mt. Pleasant Avenue (CR 660) and Northfield Avenue (CR 508 Spur).

The terrain becomes urban soon after exit 10, when it enters Orange. Here, I-280 narrows back to six lanes and heads onto a depressed alignment with frequent overpasses, running a short distance to the south of NJ Transit's Morristown Line. Along this portion, the roadway has ramps to Essex Avenue, Day Street, and Center Street. Continuing into East Orange, the freeway passes under more streets as it runs next to the Morristown Line, passing south of Brick Church station and interchanging with Harrison and Clinton streets. Near East Orange station, I-280 comes to a full interchange with the Garden State Parkway, which also has access to CR 509 and Oraton Parkway. Following this junction, the highway widens to eight lanes before becoming 10 lanes at the border with Newark.

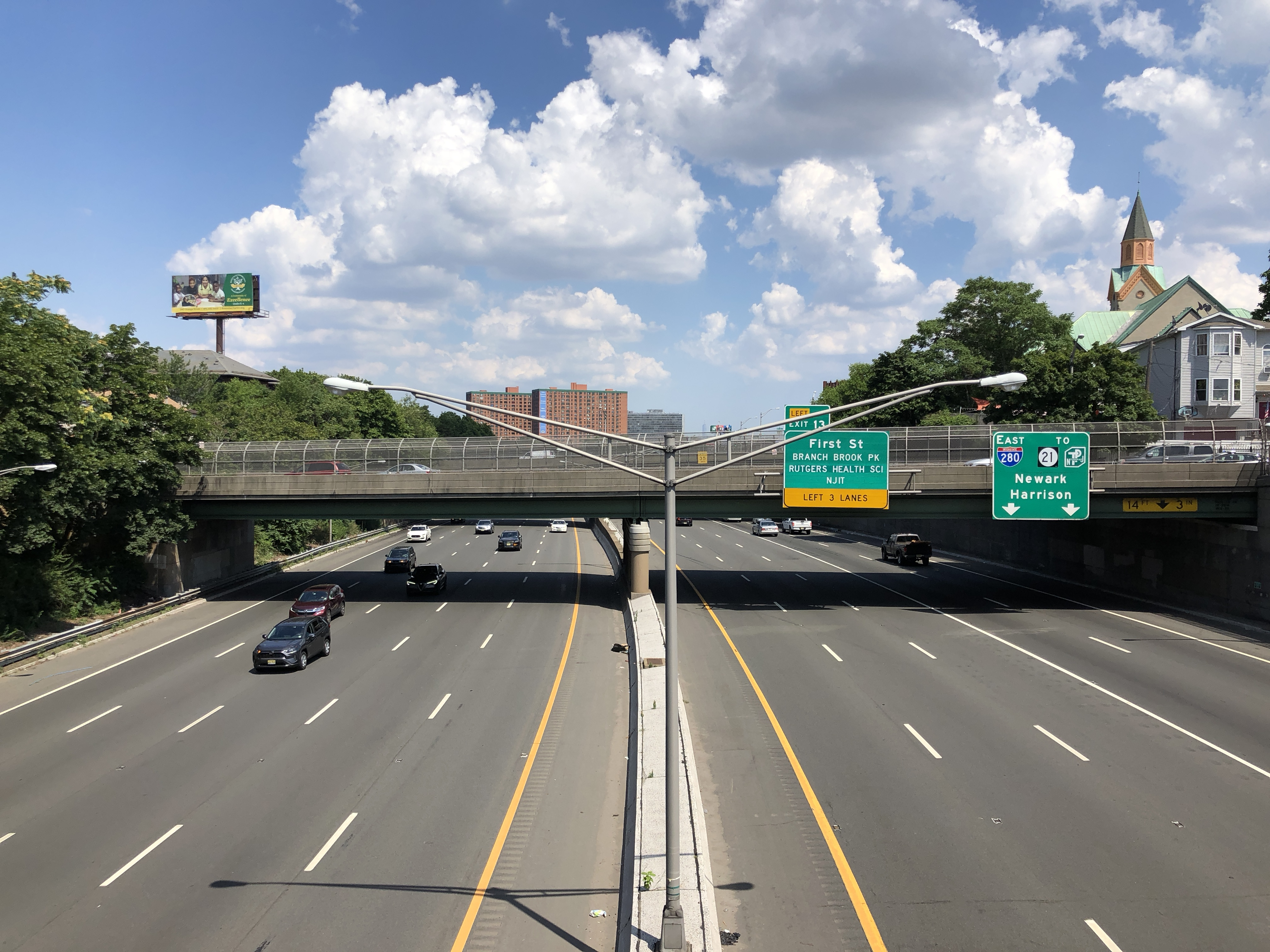
I-280 eastbound approaching the 1st Street exit in Newark

After crossing under more city streets, the roadway comes to exit 13, a left-side exit and entrance to and from the west accessing 1st Street and a ramp from the east to Orange Street. At this point, the total number of lanes on the road decreases from 10 to four, and I-280 eastbound heads up and over the exit 13 ramps, rejoining the westbound lanes on a bridge over 1st Street, Orange Street, and NJ Transit's Newark Light Rail line. As the road returns to surface level and begins to parallel NJ Transit's Morris & Essex Lines and Montclair-Boonton Line to the north, an unused bridge carries the western end of the 1954 section of freeway over the railroad to Orange Street east of Duryea Street. After this, I-280 passes under Clifton Avenue, which it has access to, and Nesbitt Street. It rises again to pass over Martin Luther King Boulevard, which is also has access to, Broad Street, and Route 21. Just after a large interchange with Route 21, I-280 crosses the Passaic River again on the six-lane William A. Stickel Memorial Bridge, a 125-foot (38 m) vertical-lift bridge, briefly entering East Newark, Hudson County before it enters Harrison.

I-280 continues to run just north of the railroad as a six-lane freeway through Harrison, reaching an interchange with CR 508. The road continues southeast through urban surroundings before turning east and passing to the north of a railroad yard, splitting from the railroad line as it runs into Kearny and enters the New Jersey Meadowlands. At the final interchange with CR 508, I-280 has access to the Holland Tunnel via Route 7, US 1/9 Truck, and Route 139. Past CR 508, the freeway narrows to four lanes and comes to the toll plaza for the New Jersey Turnpike (I-95) at exit 15W, at which point I-280 ends. Full access is provided with the turnpike's Western Spur, which carries through I-95 traffic; ramps to and from the north on the Eastern Spur allow for access to the Lincoln Tunnel via Route 495.

== History ==
Route 25A (1939–1953)

What is now the easternmost part of I-280 was legislated as Route 25A in 1939. This route was a branch of Route 25 (US 1/9) that ran from Jersey City west through Kearny and Harrison across the Passaic River and into Newark, connecting with Route 21 and Clifton Avenue. The William A. Stickel Memorial Bridge opened in 1949, with approaches stretching east to Harrison Avenue (now CR 508) in Harrison (crossing Cleveland Avenue and Hamilton Street at-grade) and west beyond Route 21 to Broad Street. Route 25A was redesignated as Route 58 in the 1953 New Jersey state highway renumbering, and, the next year, an extension opened west beyond Clifton Avenue to Orange Street east of Duryea Street.

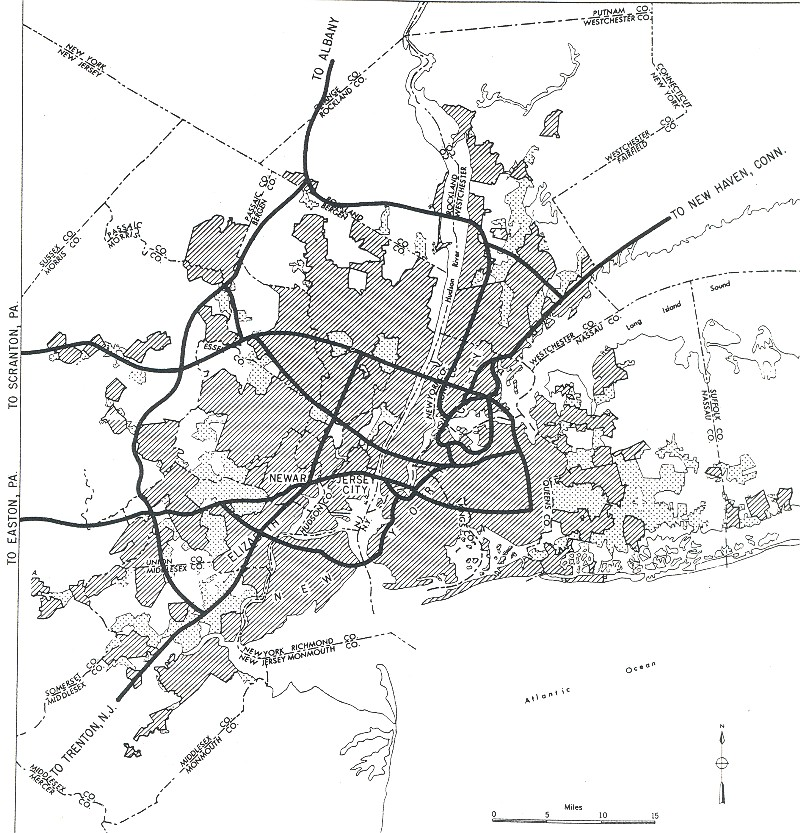
1955 map, showing the planned Interstate Highway along Route 3

Around the time the Stickel Bridge opened, the Essex Freeway was planned to connect US 46 in Morris County east to the New Jersey Turnpike in Hudson County, with the intention of alleviating traffic along Route 10. During planning for the Interstate Highway System in the 1950s, the Bureau of Public Roads proposed an Interstate Highway along Route 3, to the north of Newark. The New Jersey State Highway Department countered with the proposed Essex Freeway, which would run from Interstate 80 to the New Jersey Turnpike (Interstate 95) via the existing Route 58, saying that the Route 3 corridor "does not meet Interstate standards, and cannot be economically converted to such standards." The Essex Freeway was selected as the Interstate corridor, which was called FAI Corridor 105 before being designated I-280 in 1958.

Construction progressed slowly, starting in 1960 near Orange. There were many obstacles that had to be overcome when constructing I-280. The first was whether to build the highway on an elevated or depressed alignment through urbanized areas of East Orange and Newark. Following opposition to the elevated option, it was decided to build I-280 on a depressed alignment through the area. In addition, there was an issue of building the road across First Watchung Mountain in West Orange. A tunnel had initially been considered, although the expense of such a project caused this alternative to be rejected. Instead, a rock cut along a longer route was built through the mountain. Much of the material that was excavated from this section of I-280 and east was removed via a temporary rail line that was built in the center of the right-of-way west to Interstate 80.

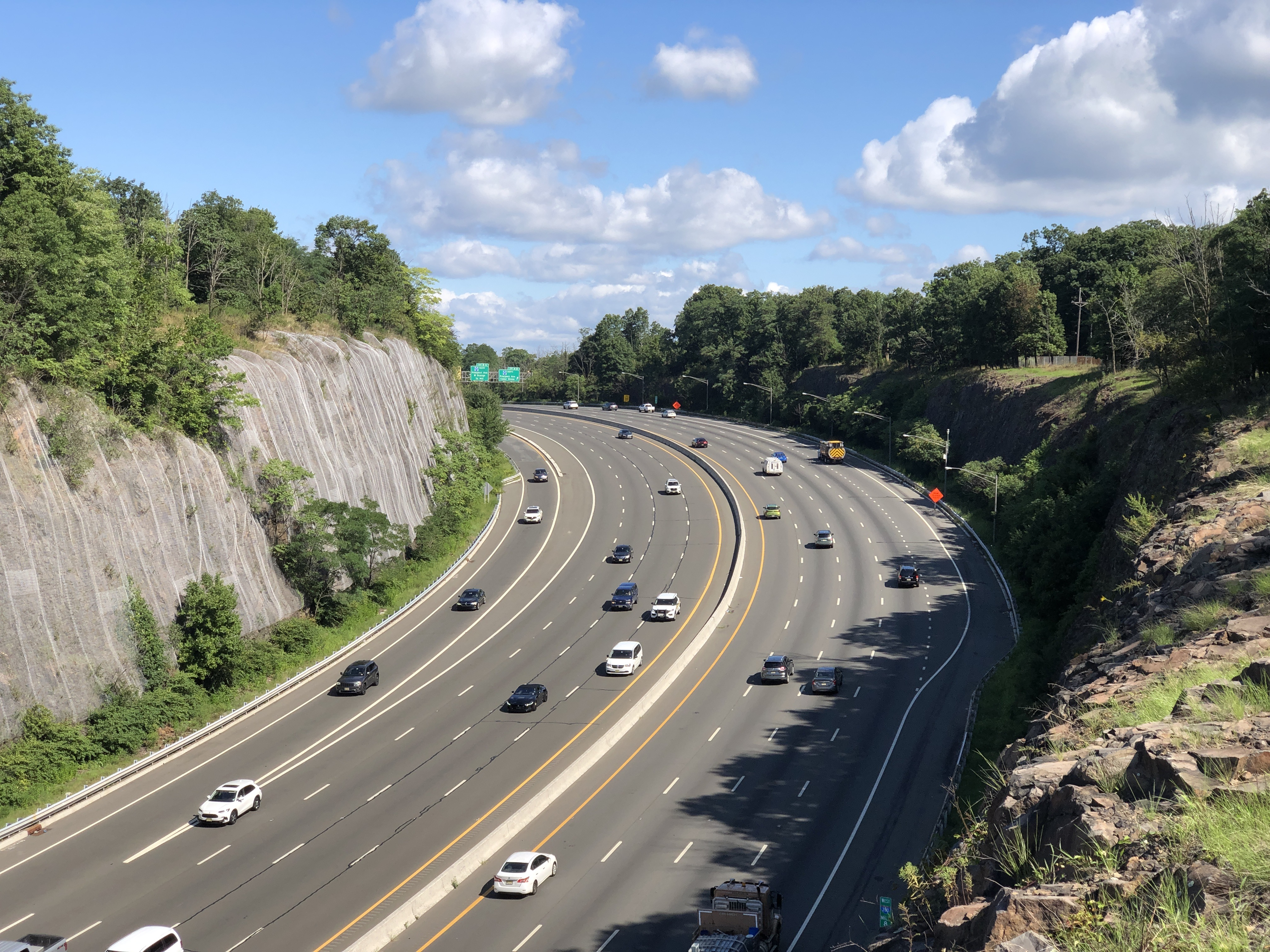
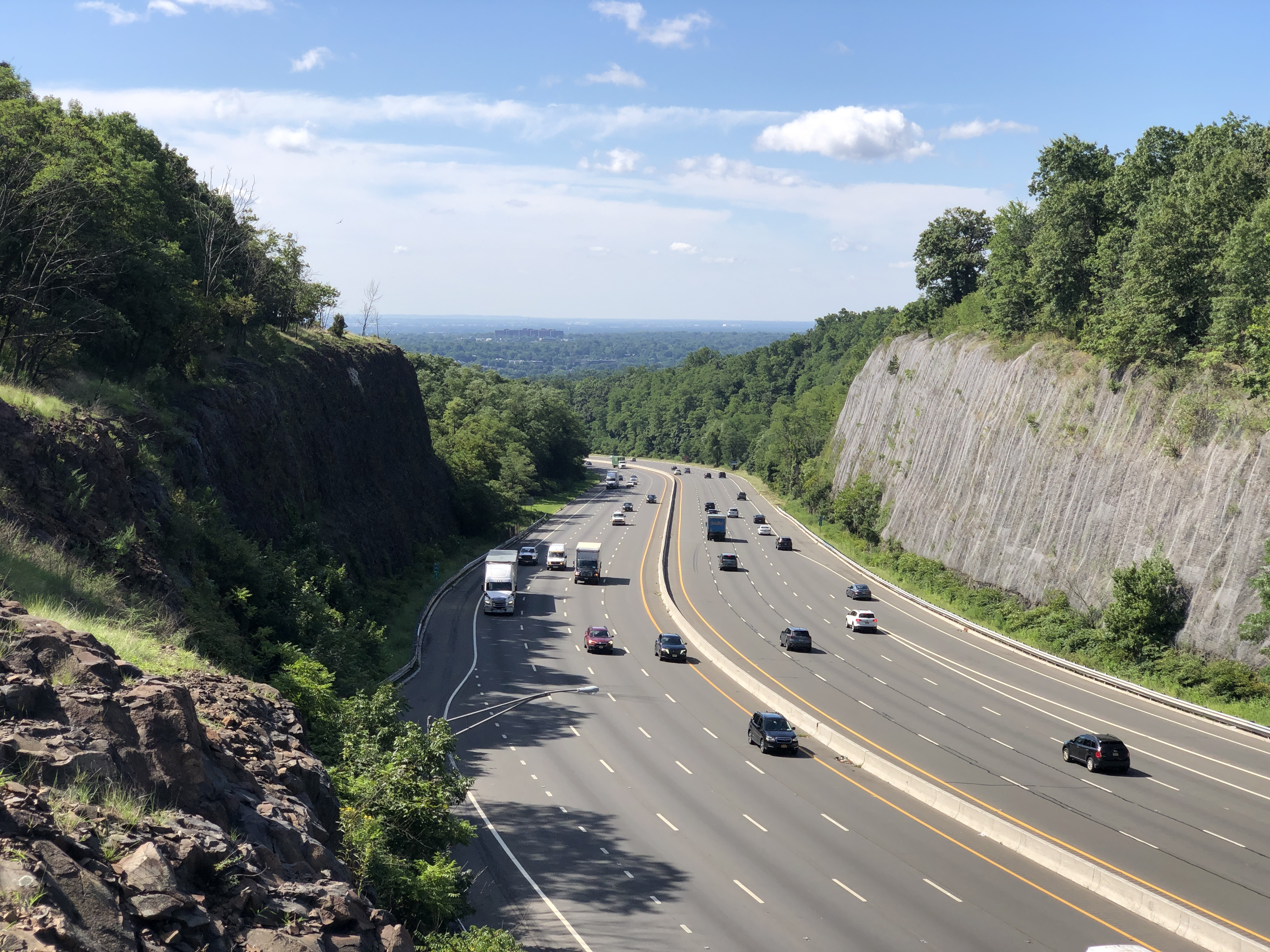
I-280 traverses the deep rock cut to ascend First Watchung Mountain

The construction of I-280 destroyed a large part of the historic urban cores of Orange, East Orange, and Newark, while providing a path for shoppers to head to shopping malls in surrounding suburban communities rather than shop in aging downtowns that had been disrupted by the highway construction. Many commercial buildings and historic Victorian homes in Orange and East Orange were demolished in the process. In the 1966 plans, I-280 was to continue east to Interstate 78 in Jersey City near the Holland Tunnel, following the CR 508 and Route 7 corridors; this was planned again in the 1970s but never built. I-280 fully opened west from Newark to Interstate 80 in Parsippany–Troy Hills in 1973. The portion of I-280 east of Newark was planned on an alignment that would disrupt the fewest homes and would utilize existing railroad and utility right-of-way. The section east from Newark to the New Jersey Turnpike was built in 1979–1980.

By 1997, the redundant Route 58 designation had been removed from the portion through Newark.

I-280, like many other highways in New Jersey, once had solar powered emergency call boxes every one mile (1.6 km), however, with the advent of cell phones, the usage of these call boxes became extremely limited. To save on maintenance costs, NJDOT removed these call boxes in 2005.

In September 2006, construction began on improvements to exit 12. This project, which replaced the ramps with longer and wider ones, was completed in November 2007 at the price of $11 million, and was completed three years ahead of schedule.

In 2001, the state determined the Stickel Bridge over the Passaic River and its approaches were structurally deficient and was going to need to be replaced after sections of it were falling apart. Instead of replacing the bridge, in 2007, the New Jersey Department of Transportation (NJDOT) decided to rehabilitate it at a lower cost. Reconstruction of the bridge was completed in April 2009 at a cost of $33 million (equivalent to $46.8 million in 2024).

A major reconstruction occurred at exit 15 in Newark from 2015 to 2018.

Replacement of partial access in central Harrison with service roads, a new interchange, and an overpass (to improve access to Harrison Avenue, the PATH station, and Sports Illustrated Stadium, and to give north–south passage to local street traffic) is in the planning stages.

== Exit list ==
County	Location	mi	km	Exit	Destinations	Notes
Morris	Parsippany–Troy Hills	0.00	0.00	–	I-80 west – Delaware Water Gap	Western terminus; exit 47A on I-80
Morris	Parsippany–Troy Hills			–	To I-287 / US 46 – Mahwah, Morristown	Westbound exit and eastbound entrance; access via I-80 local lanes
Morris	Parsippany–Troy Hills	1.55	2.49	1	Edwards Road / New Road to US 46	US 46 not signed eastbound
Essex	Roseland	3.87	6.23	4	Eisenhower Parkway (CR 609 south)	Signed as exits 4A (south) and 4B (north)
Essex	Roseland	4.95	7.97	5	CR 527 – Livingston, The Caldwells	Signed as exits 5A (south) and 5B (north)
Essex	Livingston	6.22	10.01	6	Laurel Avenue (CR 634)	Signed as exits 6A (south) and 6B (north) westbound
Essex	West Orange	7.49	12.05	7	Pleasant Valley Way (CR 636) – Millburn, Verona	
Essex	West Orange	8.23	13.24	8	CR 577 (Prospect Avenue) – West Orange, Cedar Grove	Signed as exits 8A (south) and 8B (north)
Essex	West Orange	9.64	15.51	9	Mount Pleasant Avenue (CR 660) – West Orange, Montclair	Eastbound exit and westbound entrance
Essex	West Orange	9.91	15.95	10	CR 508 – West Orange, South Orange, Montclair	Westbound exit and eastbound entrance
Essex	Orange	10.61	17.08	11	Center Street – Orange	Eastbound exit only
Essex	Orange	10.80	17.38	11B	Day Street / Essex Avenue – Orange	Westbound exit only
Essex	East Orange	11.48	18.48	11A	Harrison Street to Clinton Street – East Orange	Eastbound exit and westbound entrance; access to Clinton Street via Freeway Drive
Essex	East Orange	12.32	19.83	12	G.S. Parkway / Oraton Parkway to Clinton Street	Signed as exits 12B (Clinton) and 12A (GSP) westbound; no eastbound access to Clinton Street; exit 145 on G.S. Parkway
Essex	Newark	13.18	21.21	13	First Street – Branch Brook Park	Left eastbound exit and westbound entrance
Essex	Newark	13.40	21.57	13	Orange Street / 6th Street	Westbound exit and eastbound entrance
Essex	Newark	13.74	22.11	14A	Clifton Avenue	Westbound exit and entrance
Essex	Newark	14.11	22.71	14	Martin Luther King Boulevard – Broad Street Station, Rutgers University	Eastbound exit and entrance
Essex	Newark	14.42	23.21	15	Route 21 – Newark, Belleville	
Passaic River		14.53	23.38	William A. Stickel Memorial Bridge		
Hudson	Harrison	14.92	24.01	16	Harrison, Newark	Access via CR 508
Hudson	Kearny	16.86	27.13	17	CR 508 – Jersey City, Kearny	Signed as exits 17A (east) and 17B (west); last eastbound exit before toll
Hudson	Kearny	17.05	27.44	Exit 15W Toll Plaza		
Hudson	Kearny	17.25	27.76	–	I-95 Toll / N.J. Turnpike to I-80 west / US 46 – Trenton	Eastbound exit and westbound entrance; exit 15W on the Western Spur
Hudson	Kearny	17.85	28.73	–	I-95 Toll north (N.J. Turnpike) – Lincoln Tunnel, Secaucus	Eastern terminus; exit 15W on the Eastern Spur
1.000 mi = 1.609 km; 1.000 km = 0.621 mi: Incomplete access; Tolled

== See also ==
- Route 25AD
