= New Jersey Route 21 =

State highway in northern New Jersey, US

Route 21

Route information
- Maintained by NJDOT
- Length: 14.3 mi (23.0 km)
- Existed: 1927–present

Major junctions
- South end: I-78 / US 1-9 / US 22 in Newark
- Route 27 in Newark; I-280 in Newark; Route 7 / CR 506 in Belleville; Route 3 in Clifton
- North end: US 46 in Clifton

Location
- Country: United States
- State: New Jersey
- Counties: Essex, Passaic

Highway system
- New Jersey State Highway Routes; Interstate; US; State; Scenic Byways
← Route 20	→ US 22

Route 21 is a state highway in Northern New Jersey, running 14.35 mi (23.09 km) from the Newark Airport Interchange with US 1-9 and US 22 in Newark, Essex County to an interchange with US 46 in Clifton, Passaic County. The route is a four- to six-lane divided highway known as McCarter Highway on its southern portion in Newark that serves as a connector between the Newark and Paterson areas, following the west bank of the Passaic River for much of its length. It also serves as the main north–south highway through the central part of Newark, connecting attractions in Downtown Newark with Newark Airport. The portion of Route 21 through Newark is a surface arterial that runs alongside the elevated Northeast Corridor rail line through the southern part of the city and continues north through Downtown Newark while the portion north of Downtown Newark is a freeway. Route 21 intersects many major roads including I-78, Route 27, and I-280 in Newark, Route 7 in Belleville, and Route 3 in Clifton.

Route 21 was created in 1927 to run from Newark to Belleville. In 1948, the route was extended north to Paterson. In the 1950s construction began on the freeway portion of Route 21 and it was completed in stages between Chester Avenue in Newark and Monroe Street in Passaic between 1958 and 1973. Plans were made to extend the freeway north to I-80 in Elmwood Park; however, they were opposed by residents living on the east side of the Passaic River. In the 1980s, another northern extension of the Route 21 freeway was proposed to US 46 in Clifton; this section was built between 1997 and 2000. The surface portion of Route 21 through Newark underwent many improvements in the 1990s and 2000s.

== Route description ==
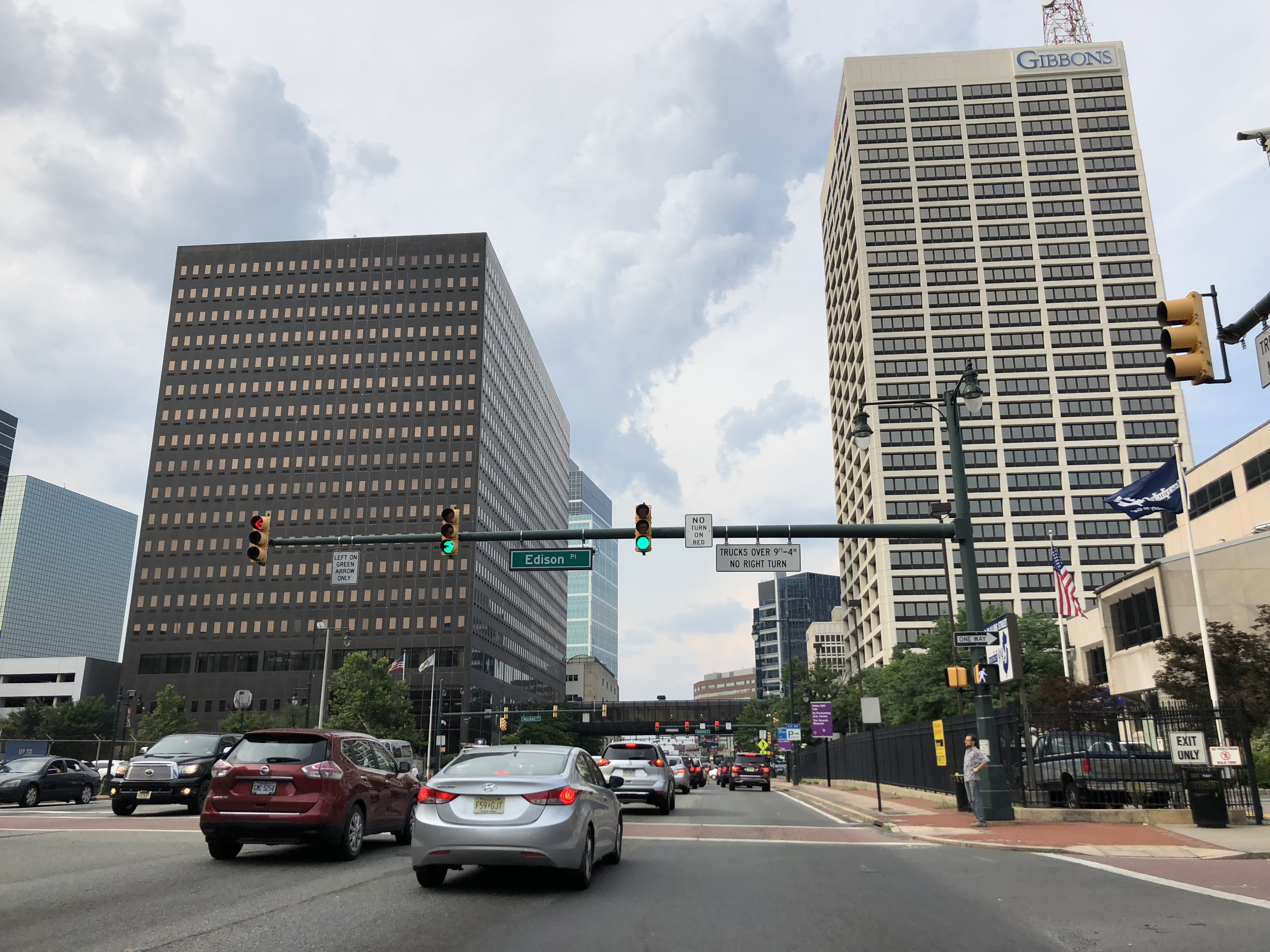
Route 21 at the Gateway Center in Downtown Newark

Route 21 heads north from the Newark Airport Interchange with US 1/9 in Newark near Newark Airport on a six-lane freeway known as McCarter Highway. This portion of Route 21 serves to connect Newark Liberty with downtown Newark. The route interchanges with I-78 and US 22 and then crosses over Conrail Shared Assets Operations' Greenville Running Track, Lehigh Line, and Passaic and Harsimus Line and then Amtrak's Northeast Corridor rail line on a viaduct, coming to an interchange with Broad Street that provides access to Frelinghuysen Avenue (Route 27). The route continues north, paralleling the elevated Northeast Corridor tracks that lead up to Newark Penn Station, which serves Amtrak and NJ Transit trains and PATH's Newark–World Trade Center line. At the intersection with Emmet Street, Route 21 becomes a four-lane surface road and intersects with Murray Street, which provides access to the Ironbound neighborhood of Newark. This section of Route 21 through the southern part of Newark has a high accident rate due to the heavy concentration of businesses and traffic lights along this portion of road. The road widens to six lanes and the route intersects with Market Street (CR 510) near Newark Penn Station and continues north into Downtown Newark, splitting from the Northeast Corridor rail line. It crosses the intersection with Raymond Boulevard and the route meets the intersection with Center Street (CR 508), which it forms a concurrency.

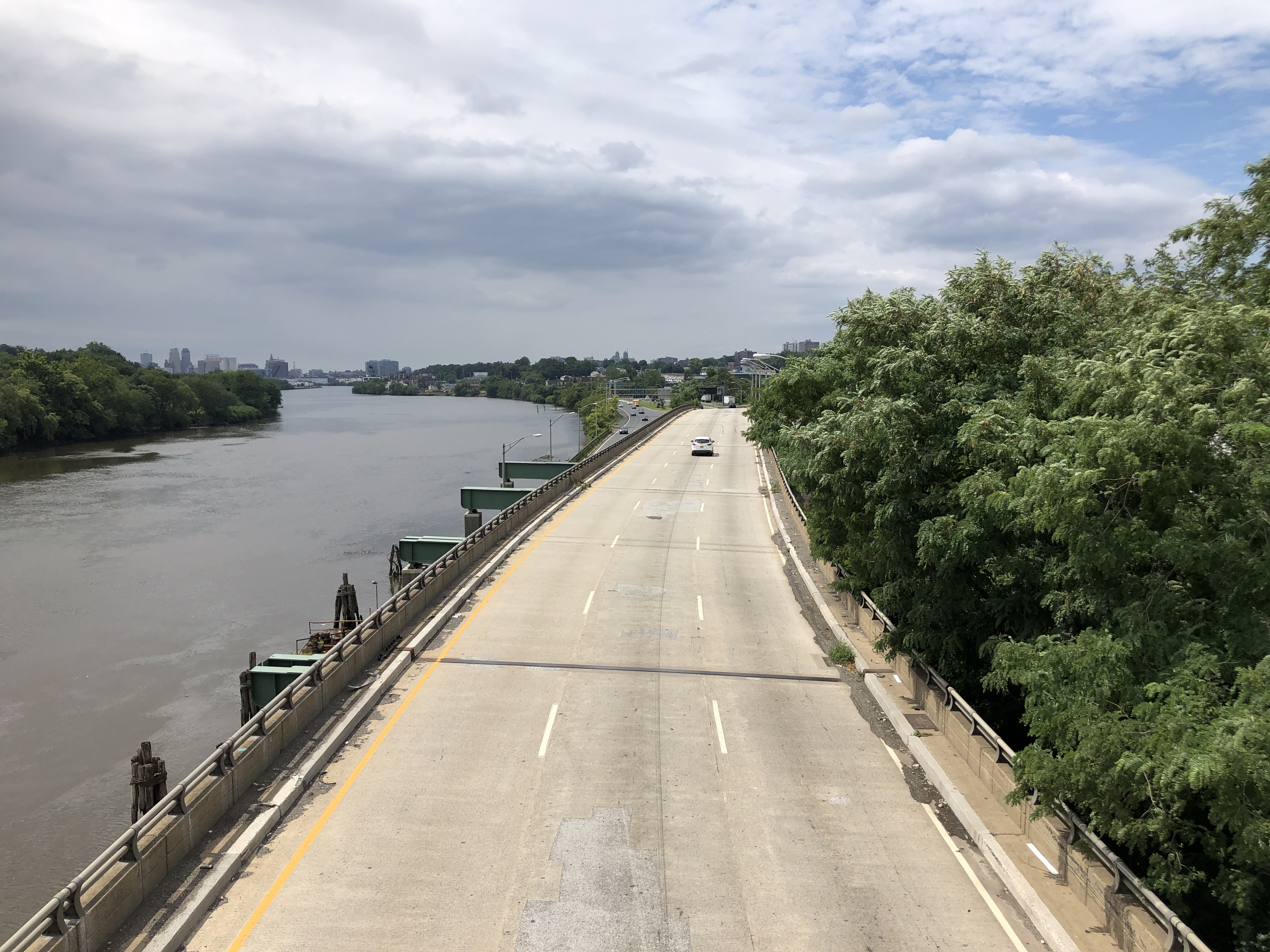
Route 21 southbound in North Newark, along the Passaic River. This section features the southbound lanes passing directly over the northbound lanes. The downtown Newark skyline is visible in the distance on the left.

Route 21 and CR 508 head along the west bank of the Passaic River, passing by the New Jersey Performing Arts Center. CR 508 splits from Route 21 by heading east on Bridge Street, crossing the Passaic River, and Route 21 continues north, passing by the former site of Bears & Eagles Riverfront Stadium. After passing under NJ Transit's Montclair-Boonton Line/Morris & Essex Lines and interchanging with I-280, the route intersects with Clay Street (CR 506 Spur). Past the intersection with 3rd Avenue, Route 21 becomes a six-lane freeway again. After about a quarter mile, the northbound side swings under the southbound side and the freeway becomes double-decker, passes by Mt. Pleasant Cemetery, and returns to single-decker configuration. It then interchanges with Chester Avenue and Riverside Avenue with a southbound exit and northbound entrance before passing over Norfolk Southern Railway's Newark Industrial Track line. Route 21 comes to a northbound exit and southbound entrance for Grafton Avenue and Mill Street; this interchange actually connects with the original McCarter Highway, a street that retains this name and acts as a service road to Route 21 for a few blocks in this area, near several industries. Route 21 briefly becomes a double-decker freeway again past the latter interchange and passes under Norfolk Southern Railway's Boonton Line, before crossing into Belleville at the Second River crossing. The freeway features a southbound exit for Mill Street and a northbound exit for Rutgers Street/Belleville Turnpike (Route 7 and CR 506) as it passes by houses on the left side of the freeway. Route 21 features an interchange with Main Street that has a southbound exit and an entrance in both directions. It enters Nutley where the freeway interchanges with County Route 646 (Park Avenue), continuing north through residential areas along the Passaic River.

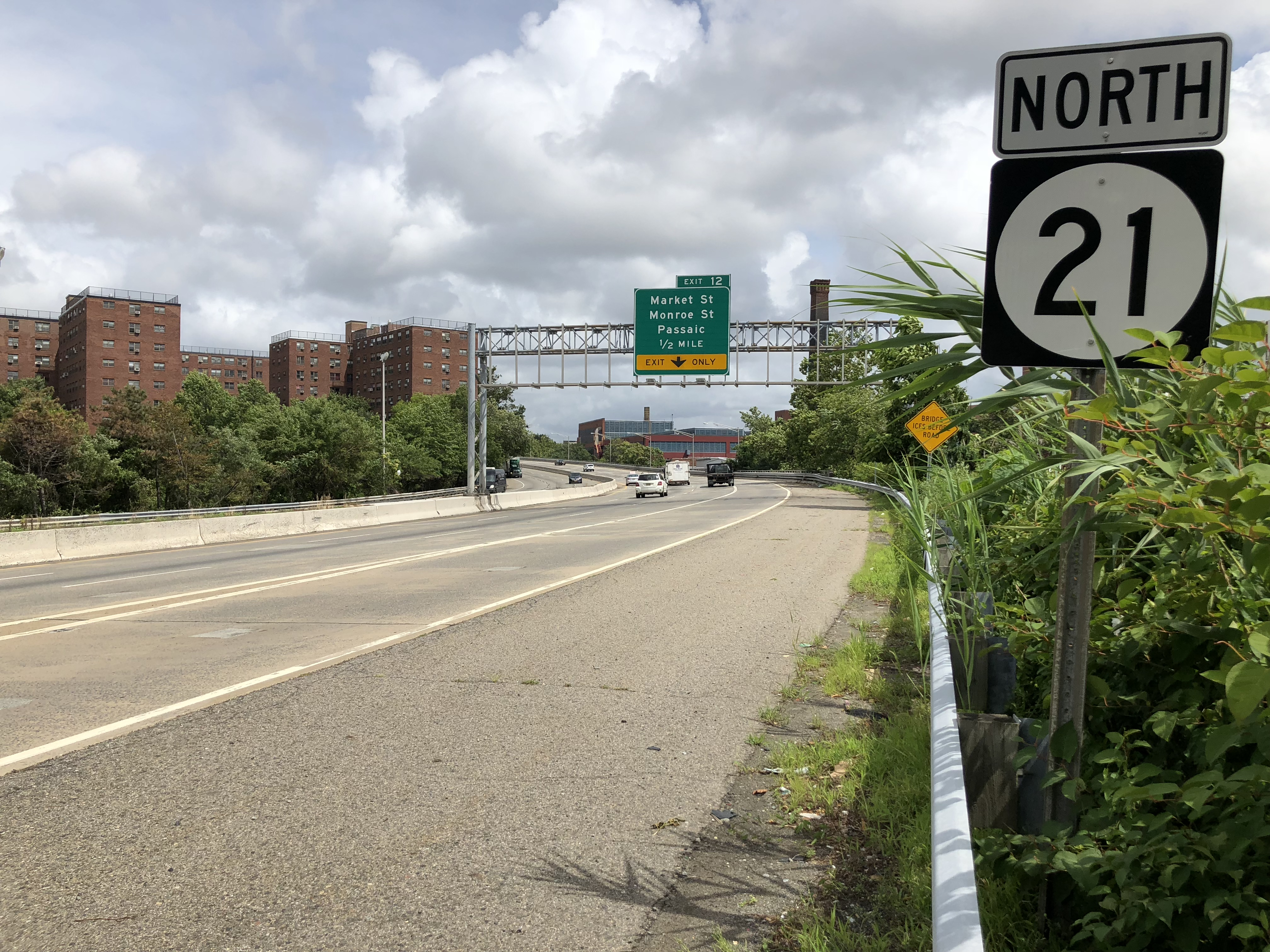
Route 21 northbound approaching the interchange with Passaic's Market Street exit in Wallington. This section was built over the riverbed of the Passaic River, which was moved to the east to make way for highway construction, but the municipal boundary was never adjusted.

As Route 21 crosses into Clifton, Passaic County, it passes under NJ Transit's Main Line and comes to an interchange with Route 3. North of this point, the freeway comes to a northbound exit and southbound entrance for southbound River Road (CR 624), passing through residential neighborhoods, and enters Passaic. In Passaic, Route 21 interchanges with Brook Avenue (CR 608), Van Houten Avenue (CR 614), and River Drive (CR 624). The route features an interchange with River Drive (CR 624) and Main Avenue (CR 601) and meets State Street at a partial interchange with a northbound exit and southbound entrance. This interchange provides access to the Union Avenue Bridge over the Passaic. Route 21 heads farther to the west of the Passaic River, passing through industrial and residential areas of Passaic. The freeway briefly enters Wallington and comes to an interchange that provides access to Market Street (CR 619), Dayton Avenue, and Monroe Street. Route 21 continues to the north and resumes along the west bank of the Passaic River, narrowing to four lanes and crossing back into Clifton. Upon entering Clifton, the route comes to an interchange with Ackerman Avenue. The freeway heads to the northwest, passing by a park and featuring a southbound exit and northbound entrance for Lexington Avenue before ending at an interchange with US 46.

== History ==
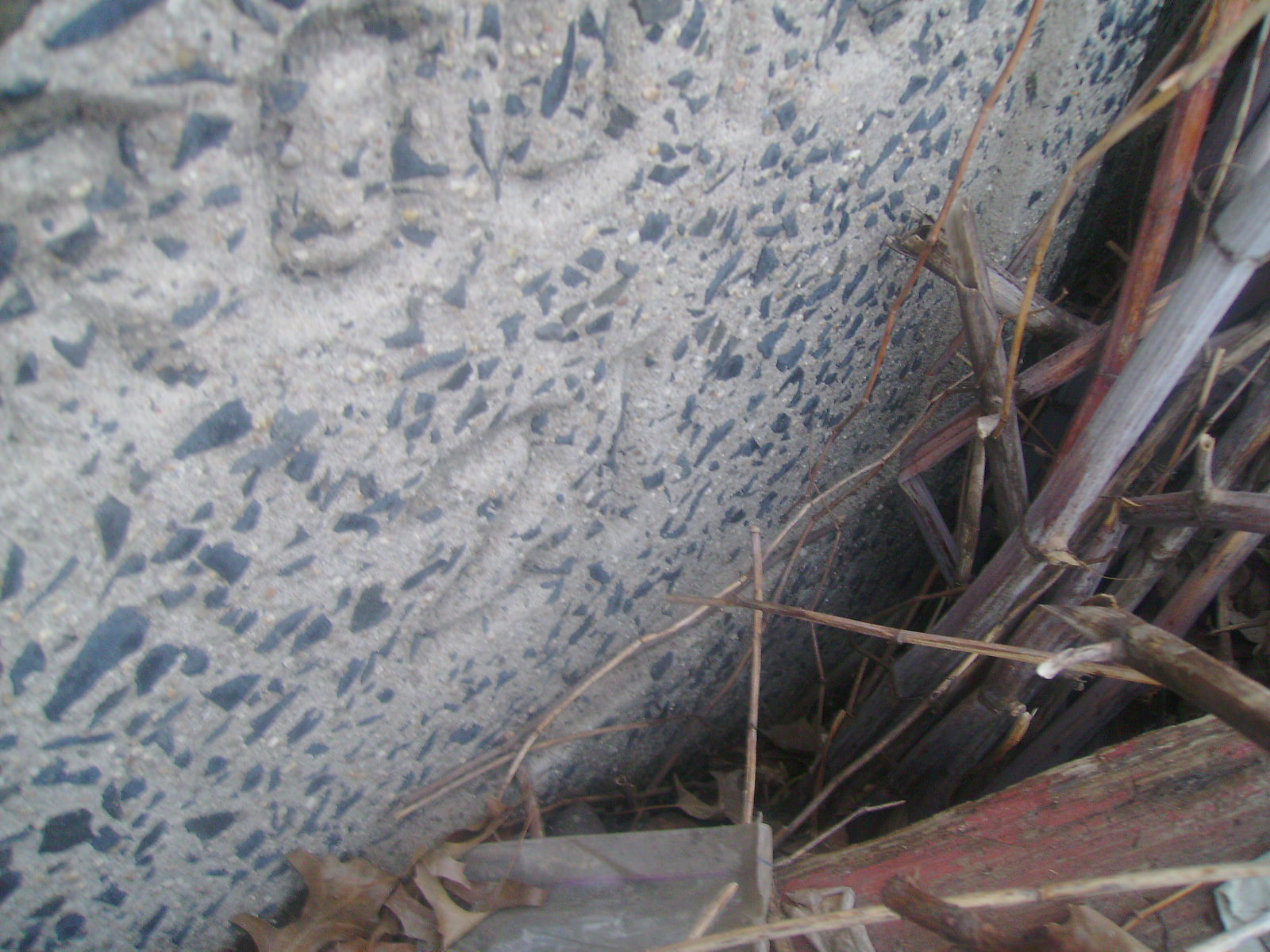
Bridge stamp for Route 21 along former alignment, which was known as Route 21A.

Route 21 history starts in 1927 with the New Jersey highway renumbering plan. At that time it was set up as a surface roadway running through Newark and Belleville, with at-grade interchanges with local streets. This surface road eventually extended to Paterson.

From the late 1950s through the early 1970s, much of the highway north of Newark was rebuilt as a limited-interchange freeway., through most of its portion in the City of Passaic. The remaining portion through downtown Passaic and the Botany Village portion of Clifton was not constructed until the last four years of the 20th century.

Further improvements to the remaining surface portion were made to the Newark portion, though most of it remains as city streets.

=== Original surface road ===
Route 21 was first defined in the 1927 New Jersey state highway renumbering to run from Route 25 (now US 1/9) and Route 29 (now US 22) in Newark north to Belleville. The surface portion of Route 21 in Newark, which follows the Northeast Corridor rail line, was commissioned in 1934 between Routes 25 and 29 and Market Street and the portion through downtown Newark was commissioned in 1936 between Market Street and Clay Street. Route 19 was designated in 1939 from Paterson to Belleville. In 1948, the Route 21 designation was extended north to Paterson, replacing Route 19 (which has since been reassigned elsewhere).

By Joint Resolution No. 4, approved March 22, 1934, the New Jersey Legislature designated Route 21 as the McCarter Highway, in memory of Newark financier and philanthropist Uzal Haggerty McCarter.

=== Freeway ===
Plans for a freeway along the Route 21 corridor between Newark and Paterson date back to the early 1930s and became official in 1951. In 1958, the highway was extended northward as a freeway along the west bank of the Passaic River to an interchange with Park Avenue in Nutley. Route 21 was extended to the Passaic Park interchange in 1962, Main Avenue in 1968, and Monroe Street in 1973. 1970s legislation stopped the further extension northward until environmental impact could be assessed, leaving a two-mile city street portion in place to connect to Routes 20, 46, and I-80 in Paterson for over 25 years.

With the completion of the freeway to Monroe Street, a portion of the former route was briefly known as Route 21A.

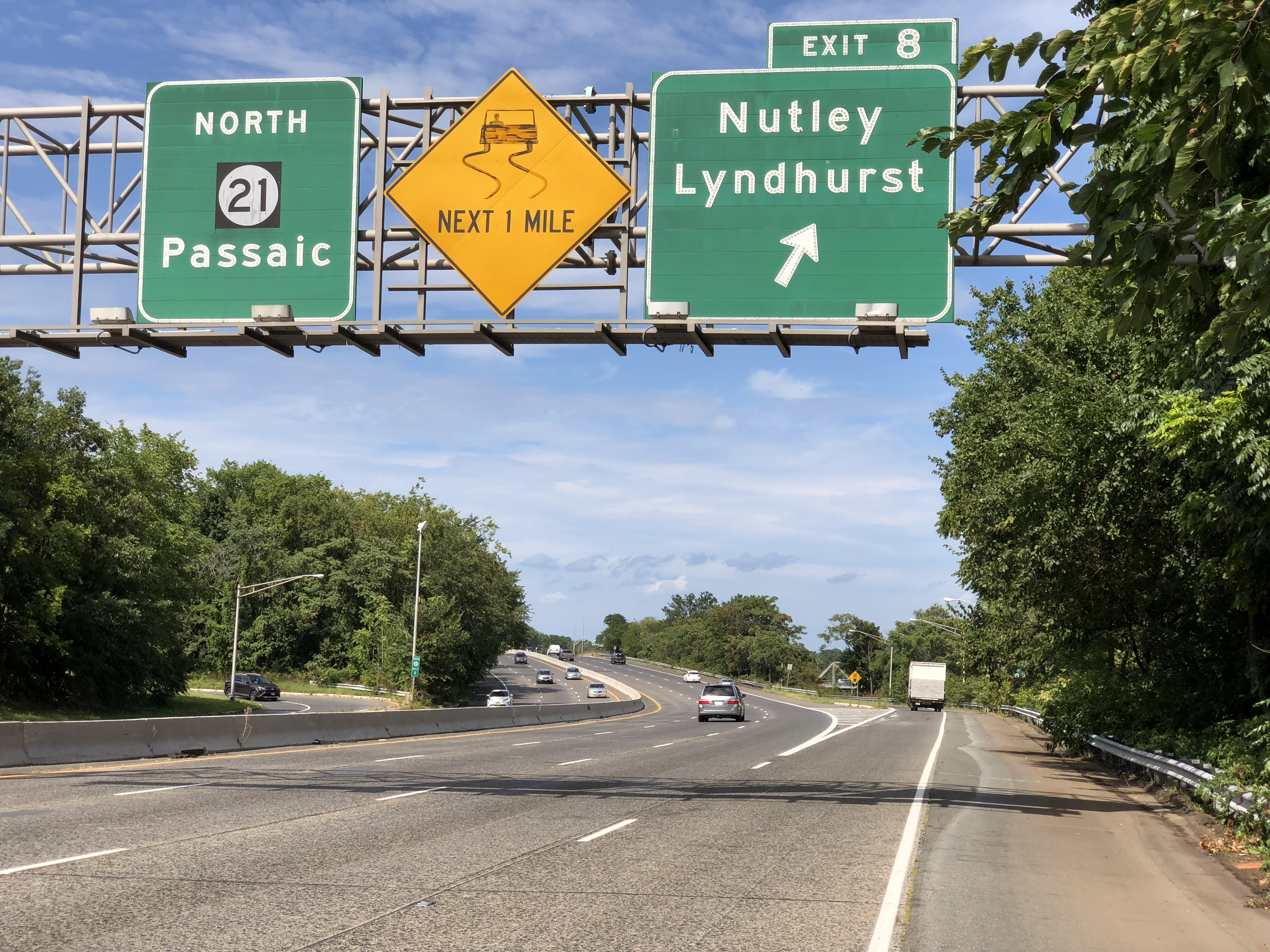
View north along Route 21 at Exit 8 in Nutley

According to the original freeway plans, the portion north of Monroe Street was to cross over the Passaic River and terminated in Elmwood Park at the interchange of I-80 and CR 507. This routing would have allowed the highway continue with six full lanes. However, the proposal was opposed by residents who lived on the east side of the Passaic River, and for a quarter-century, traffic headed for Paterson had to use local streets in Passaic.

In the 1980s, plans were resurrected for completing the Route 21 freeway along the west bank of the Passaic River to US 46 in Clifton, avoiding the earlier objections. Official plans were made in 1996, and in late 1997, construction began on this portion of the freeway. It opened on December 20, 2000, at a cost of $136 million. However, this new route was limited mostly to four lanes (three lanes at the very northern end), utilizing the right of way of the Dundee Canal. A wider highway would have encroached on private property or the Passaic River, entailing much greater costs.

=== Newark section improvements ===
Sections of Route 21 through Newark were improved in the 1990s and the 2000s. The four-lane viaduct over the Northeast Corridor, which was built in the 1920s, was replaced between 1997 and 2003 at a cost of $253 million. A major reconstruction occurred at the interchange with I-280 at the William A. Stickel Memorial Bridge in Newark from 2015 to 2018.

On April 27, 2018, the portion of Route 21 between mileposts 3.90 and 5.83 was dedicated the "Roberto Clemente Memorial Highway" after the late baseball legend Roberto Clemente, who wore number 21 for his entire career with the Pittsburgh Pirates.

== Major intersections ==
County	Location	mi	km	Exit	Destinations	Notes
Essex	Newark	0.0	0.0	–	US 1-9 south – Newark Airport, Elizabeth	Southern terminus
Essex	Newark			–	US 22 west – Hillside	Southbound exit and northbound entrance
Essex	Newark			–	I-78 / US 1-9 north to I-95 Toll / N.J. Turnpike / G.S. Parkway – Port Newark, Clinton	Southbound exit and northbound entrance; exit 57 on I-78
Essex	Newark	0.7	1.1	–	Broad Street	
Essex	Newark	0.9	1.4	Northern end of freeway section		
Essex	Newark	1.1	1.8		Murray Street – Ironbound Area	
Essex	Newark	2.2	3.5		CR 510 west (Market Street)	Eastern terminus of CR 510
Essex	Newark	2.5	4.0		CR 508 west (Center Street)	Southern end of CR 508 concurrency
Essex	Newark	2.9	4.7		CR 508 east (Bridge Street) – Harrison	Northern end of CR 508 concurrency
Essex	Newark	3.2	5.1		I-280 to N.J. Turnpike (I-95 Toll) – Harrison, Jersey City, The Oranges	Exit 15 on I-280; former Route 58
Essex	Newark	3.3	5.3		CR 506 Spur west (Clay Street)	Eastern terminus of CR 506 Spur
Essex	Newark	3.9	6.3	Southern end of freeway section		
Essex	Newark	4.6	7.4	4	Chester Avenue / Riverside Avenue	Southbound exit and northbound entrance
Essex	Newark	5.3	8.5	5	To Grafton Avenue / Mill Street – North Newark	Northbound exit and southbound entrance; access via Main Street
Essex	Belleville	5.8	9.3	5	Mill Street – Belleville, North Newark	Southbound exit only; access via Main Street
Essex	Belleville	6.1	9.8	6	Route 7 east / CR 506 west – Belleville, North Arlington	Northbound exit only; CR 506 not signed
Essex	Belleville	6.7	10.8	7	Main Street – Belleville	No northbound exit
Essex	Nutley	8.0	12.9	8	Nutley, Lyndhurst	Access via CR 646
Passaic	Clifton	9.2	14.8	9	Route 3 – Clifton, Lincoln Tunnel	
Passaic	Clifton	9.9	15.9	10A	River Road (CR 624 south) – Clifton	Northbound exit and southbound entrance
Passaic	Passaic	10.3	16.6	10B	Passaic Park, Clifton, Rutherford	Access via CR 608/CR 614/CR 624; signed as exit 10 southbound
Passaic	Passaic	11.2	18.0	11A	River Drive (CR 624) / Main Avenue (CR 601) – Passaic	Signed for River Drive northbound, Main Avenue southbound; signed as exit 11 southbound
Passaic	Passaic	11.7	18.8	11B	State Street – Passaic	Northbound exit and southbound entrance
Passaic	Passaic	12.6	20.3	12	Market Street (CR 619) / Dayton Avenue / Monroe Street – Passaic	
Passaic	Clifton	13.5	21.7	13	Ackerman Avenue – Botany Village, Garfield	No southbound exit
Passaic	Clifton			13	Randolph Avenue – Botany Village, Garfield	Southbound exit only
Passaic	Clifton	14.1	22.7	14	Lexington Avenue	Southbound exit only
Passaic	Clifton	14.3	23.0	–	US 46 east to Route 20 north / I-80 – Elmwood Park, Paterson	Northern terminus
1.000 mi = 1.609 km; 1.000 km = 0.621 mi: Concurrency terminus; Incomplete access
