= Newark Airport Interchange =

- Interactive map of Newark Airport Interchange

Location
- Newark, New Jersey
- Coordinates: 40.710573°N 74.168186°W
- Roads at junction: I-95 / N.J. Turnpike; I-78 / Newark Bay Extension; US 1-9 (Pulaski Skyway); US 22; Route 21 (McCarter Highway); Brewster Road

Construction
- Type: Hybrid interchange
- Opened: January 15, 1952
- Maintained by: New Jersey Department of Transportation

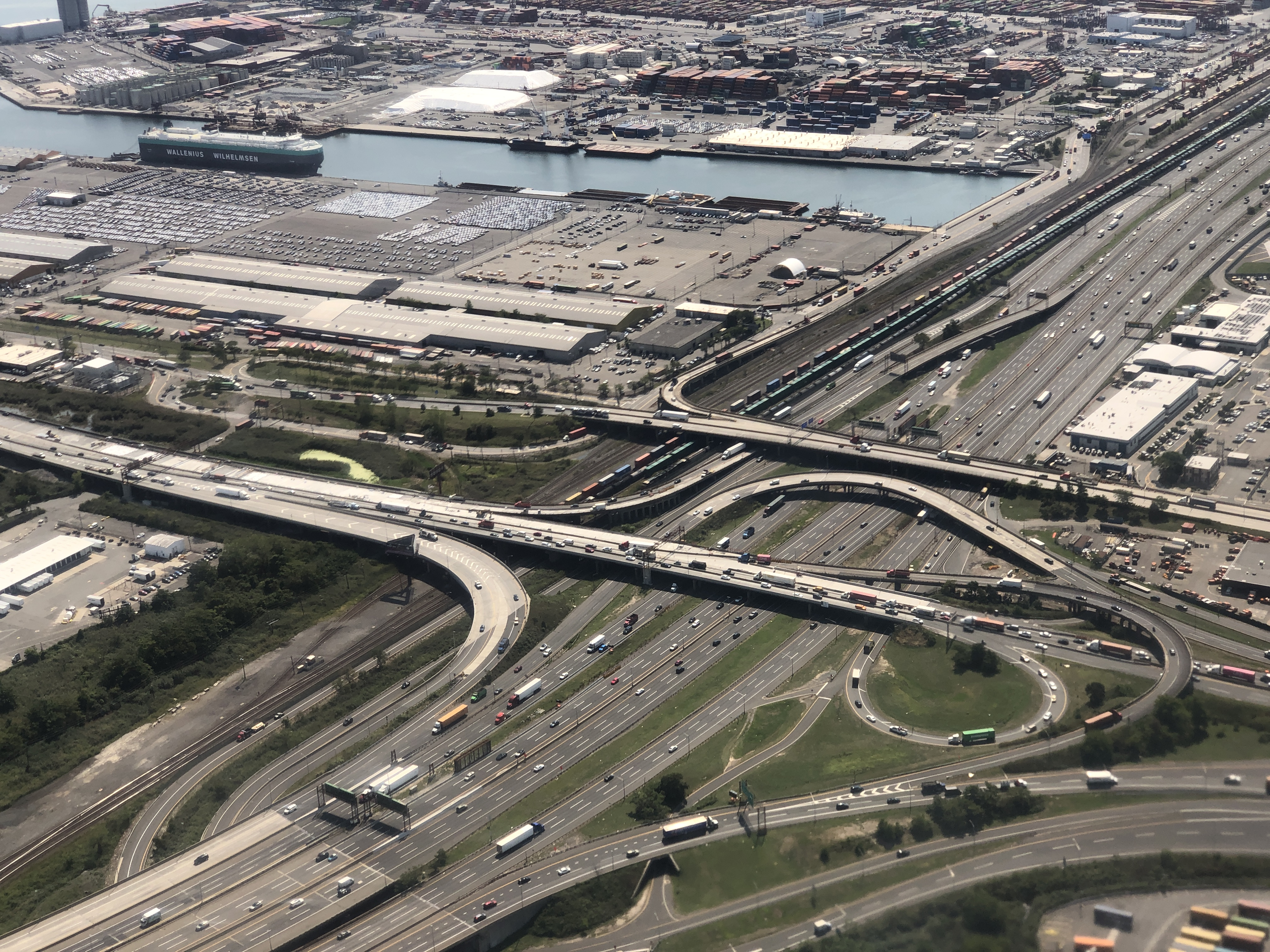
Aerial view from an airplane which just took off from Newark Liberty International Airport

The Newark Airport Interchange is a massive interchange of Interstate 78, U.S. Route 1-9, U.S. Route 22, New Jersey Route 21, and Interstate 95 (the New Jersey Turnpike) in Newark, New Jersey, at the northern edge of Newark Liberty International Airport.

The New Jersey Turnpike Authority (NJTA) refers to this area as the Southern Mixing Bowl of the New Jersey Turnpike system of highways because it is at the point where the Newark Bay Extension of the turnpike meets the mainline, and where the mainline northbound splits into the western spur and eastern spur.

== Description ==
Exits 57 and 58 of I-78 take passengers to Newark Airport and Downtown Newark. At the eastern end of the interchange, I-78 enters toll barriers, crosses Interstate 95 and becomes the Newark Bay Extension of the New Jersey Turnpike. The eastern terminus of U.S. Route 22 and the southern terminus of Route 21 are both at the interchange. U.S. Route 1-9 passes through the interchange as well. The interchange provides access to Newark Liberty International Airport.

== History ==
The Newark Interchange is a complex interchange in northeastern New Jersey that opened to the public on January 15, 1952. At the opening of the turnpike, the interchange provided access to the airport via U.S. Route 1-9. In 1956, the Port Authority of New York and New Jersey (operator of Newark Airport) and the New Jersey Turnpike Authority announced a $9 million improvement project to construct graded interchanges that would offer direct access to the airport. After the completion of Interstate 78 through the Newark area in the 1970s, it became part of the interchange complex.
