= Union Avenue Bridge (Passaic River) =

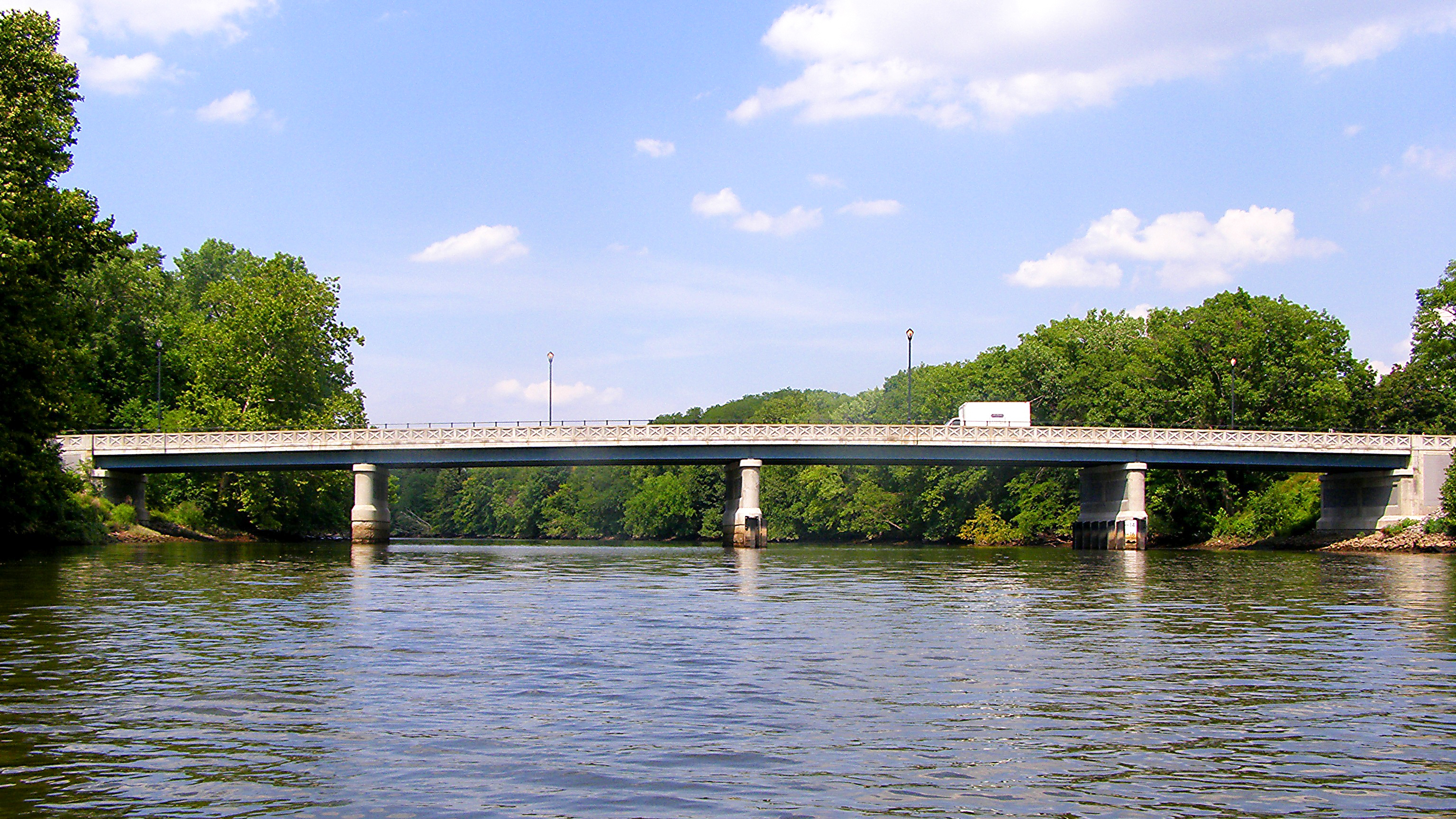
- Coordinates: 40°50′30″N 74°07′23″W
- Carries: Union Avenue (CR S32) to River Drive and Route 21
- Crosses: Passaic River
- Locale: Rutherford & Passaic, New Jersey
- Other name: Douglas O. Mead Bridge
- Owner: Bergen County and Passaic County
- Maintained by: NJDOT
- ID number: 1600022
- Preceded by: 1896; 130 years ago

Characteristics
- Material: Steel/concrete
- Total length: 295.9 feet (90.2 m)
- Width: 39 feet (12 m)
- Longest span: 80.1 feet (24.4 m)
- No. of spans: 4
- Clearance above: 16.1 feet (4.9 m)

History
- Constructed by: M.J. Paquet, Inc
- Construction cost: $9.5m
- Opened: 2002; 24 years ago

Location
- Interactive map of Union Avenue Bridge

Union Avenue Bridge is a vehicular bridge over the Passaic River in northeastern New Jersey, crossing the county line at the town of Rutherford in Bergen County and the city of Passaic in Passaic County. It takes its name from Union Avenue (CR S32) in Rutherford which connects to River Drive (and access to Route 21) in Passaic. The two-lane, four-span fixed bridge which opened in 2002 is 13.2 miles (21.2 km) from the river's mouth at Newark Bay. There is another Union Avenue Bridge traversing the Passaic at Little Falls

== History ==
The bridge replaced an earlier structure built in 1896. In 1963 it was struck by a barge which left it damaged; requiring it remain in the open position for two weeks. It was dedicated to Douglas O. Mead (1894–1971), a World War I and World War II veteran.

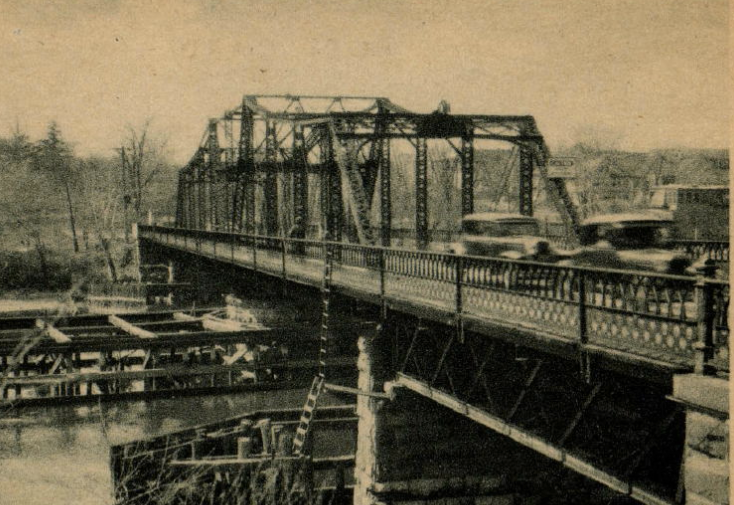
Earlier bridge

== See also ==
- List of crossings of the Lower Passaic River
- List of county routes in Bergen County, New Jersey
- Rutherford (NJT station)
