= U.S. Route 1/9 =

Highway in New Jersey and New York

U.S. Route 1/9
- US 1/9 highlighted in red

Route information
- Maintained by NJDOT, PANYNJ, and NYSDOT
- Length: 31.01 mi (49.91 km)
- Existed: 1926–present
- Component highways: US 1 entire length; US 9 entire length
- Restrictions: No trucks on the Pulaski Skyway

Major junctions
- South end: US 1 / US 9 in Woodbridge Township
- Route 35 in Woodbridge Township; I-278 in Linden; Route 81 in Elizabeth; I-78 / US 22 / Route 21 in Newark; I-78 in Newark; I-95 Toll / N.J. Turnpike / US 1-9 Truck in Newark; US 1-9 Truck / Route 139 in Jersey City; Route 3 / Route 495 in North Bergen; US 46 in Palisades Park; I-95 / N.J. Turnpike / US 9W / Route 4 in Fort Lee
- North end: I-95 / US 1 / US 9 / NY 9A / Henry Hudson Parkway in Manhattan, New York

Location
- Country: United States
- States: New Jersey, New York
- Counties: NJ: Middlesex, Union, Essex, Hudson, Bergen; NY: New York

Highway system
- United States Numbered Highway System; List; Special; Divided
← I-895	US 1	→ Route 1
← Route 8	US 9	→ Route 9

U.S. Route 1/9 (US 1/9 or US 1-9) is the 31.0-mile-long (49.9 km) concurrency of US 1 and US 9 from their junction in Woodbridge in Middlesex County, New Jersey, north to New York City. The route is a multilane road with some freeway portions that runs through urbanized areas of North Jersey adjacent to New York City. Throughout most of its length in New Jersey, the road runs near the New Jersey Turnpike (Interstate 95 [I-95]). In Fort Lee, US 1/9 merges onto I-95 and crosses the Hudson River on the George Washington Bridge, where the two U.S. Routes split a short distance into New York. US 1/9 intersects several major roads, including I-278 in Linden, Route 81 in Elizabeth, I-78 and US 22 in Newark, Route 139 in Jersey City, Route 3 and Route 495 in North Bergen, and US 46 in Palisades Park. US 1/9 also serves as the primary access point to Newark Airport. Between Newark and Jersey City, US 1/9 runs along the Pulaski Skyway. Trucks are banned from this section of road and must use Truck US 1/9. The concurrency between US 1 and US 9 is commonly referred to as "1 and 9". Some signage for the concurrency, as well as the truck route, combines the two roads into one shield, separated by a hyphen (1-9) or an ampersand (1&9).

The current alignment of US 1/9 south of Elizabeth was planned as Route 1 in 1916; this road was extended to the Holland Tunnel in Jersey City in 1922. When the U.S. Highway System was created in 1926, US 1 and US 9 were marked concurrent through northern New Jersey between Rahway on the current alignments of Route 27 and Truck US 1/9. In 1927, Route 1 became Route 25, and Route 1 and Route 6 were legislated along the current US 1/9 north of Jersey City. US 1/9 originally went to the Holland Tunnel on Route 25; after the George Washington Bridge opened, the two routes were realigned to their current routing north of Jersey City. After the Pulaski Skyway opened in 1932, US 1/9 and Route 25 were routed to use this road, which soon had a truck ban resulting in the creation of Route 25T (now US 1/9 Truck). South of Newark, US 1/9 was moved from Route 27 to Route 25. In 1953, the state highways running concurrent with US 1/9 in New Jersey were removed. In 1964, the approaches to the George Washington Bridge were upgraded into I-95.

== Route description ==
Time-lapse video of a trip on US 1/9 on a rainy day

=== Middlesex and Union counties ===
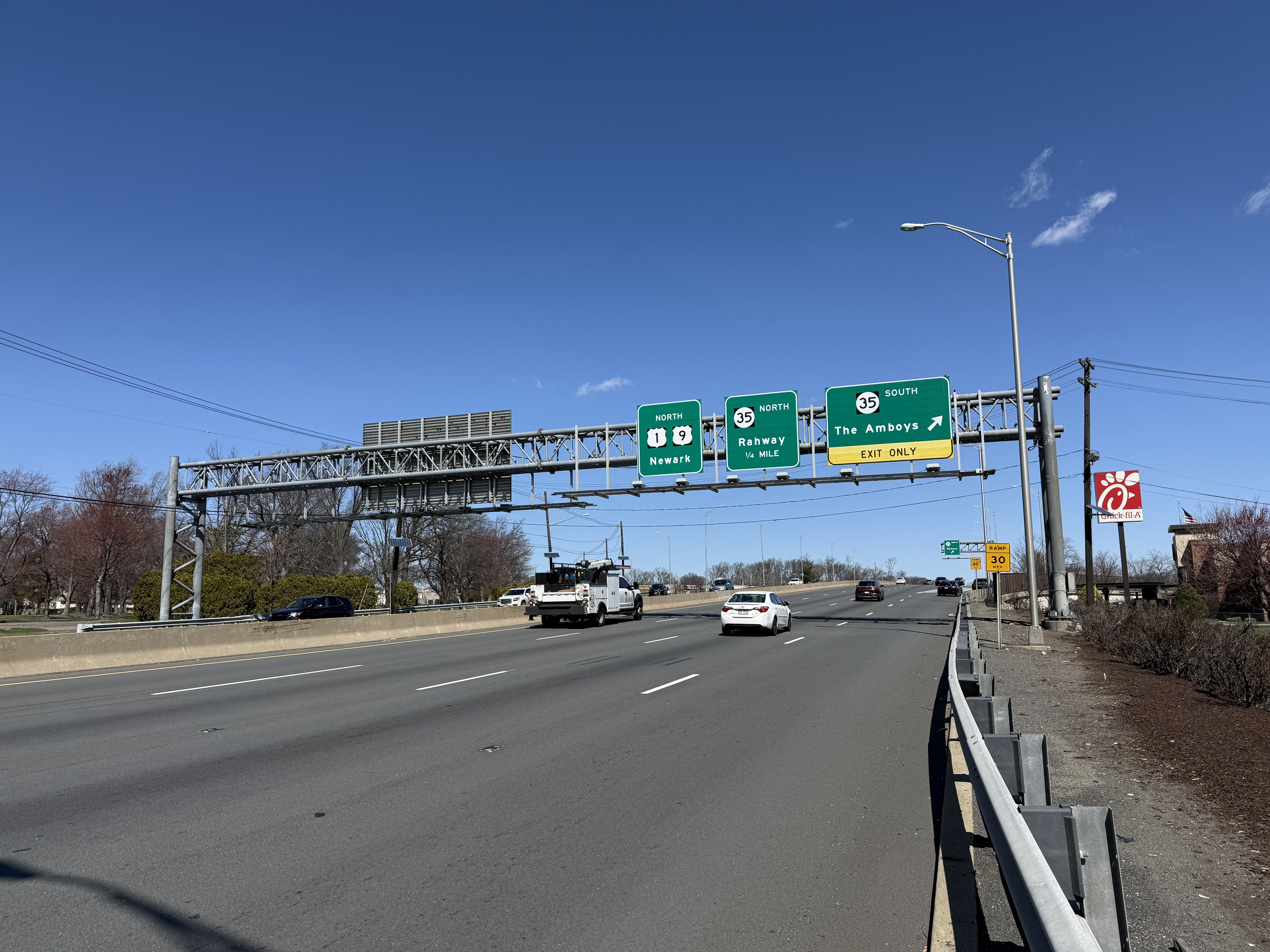
View north along US 1/9 at Route 35 in Woodbridge Township

US 1 and US 9 begin their concurrency at a directional interchange in Woodbridge, Middlesex County. US 1 comes from the southwest, where it serves the state capital of Trenton, along with New Brunswick and Edison; while US 9 comes from the south, where it serves the Jersey Shore region, along with the suburban communities of Freehold Township and Old Bridge Township; a short distance to the north of an interchange with the New Jersey Turnpike (I-95) and the Garden State Parkway. The combined US 1/9 runs northeast through business areas as a six-lane divided highway, coming to a partial cloverleaf interchange with Route 35 a short distance after the merge. From this interchange, the road continues as a surface road with some jughandles, passing over NJ Transit's North Jersey Coast Line.

A short distance later, US 1/9 crosses into Rahway, Union County, where the road crosses the Rahway River before intersecting Lawrence Street (County Route 514 [CR 514]) in the southbound direction. The highway turns more northeast, becoming known as Edgar Road in Linden. In Linden, US 1/9 passes through a mix of industrial and business areas, crossing under Conrail Shared Assets Operations' (CSAO) Linden Industrial Track line before passing between Linden Airport and the former Linden Assembly plant used by General Motors to the west. Following the intersection with South Stiles Street (CR 615), the road enters more urbanized areas of homes and businesses. After passing near a couple of cemeteries, the highway runs to the west of Phillips 66's Bayway Refinery before passing under a Staten Island Railway freight line that is used by CSAO. After this bridge, US 1/9 meets the western terminus of I-278 at a partial interchange with a northbound exit and southbound entrance from US 1/9. Past this interchange, US 1/9 continues into Elizabeth, where it intersects South Elmora Avenue/Bayway (Route 439) at the Bayway Circle, which has been modified to allow US 1/9 to run straight through. At this point, US 1/9 splits from Edgar Road. From the Bayway Circle, the road turns more to the east before making a sharp turn to the north-northeast and crossing the Elizabeth River on a skyway, which ends at the intersection with East Jersey Street. The road continues north through urban neighborhoods as Spring Street, passing under CSAO's Elizabeth Industrial Track line. The highway reaches an intersection with North Avenue, at which point US 1/9 turns into a freeway with a local–express lane configuration, carrying two local lanes and two express lanes in each direction for a total of eight lanes. The freeway comes to an interchange with the northern terminus of Route 81, and it continues around the west side of Newark Airport.

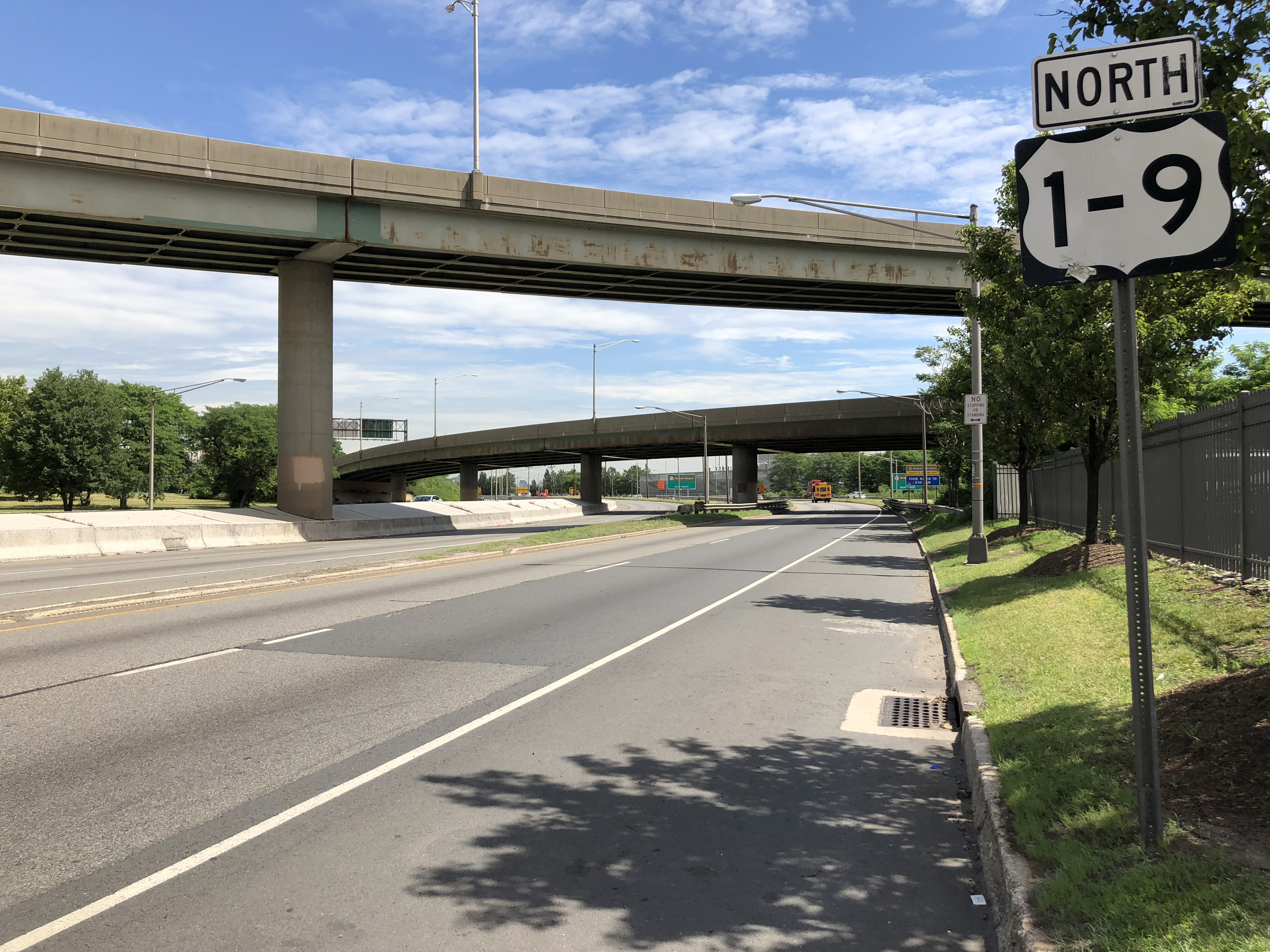
View north along US 1/9 (Spring Street) at Route 81 in Elizabeth

=== Essex and Hudson counties ===
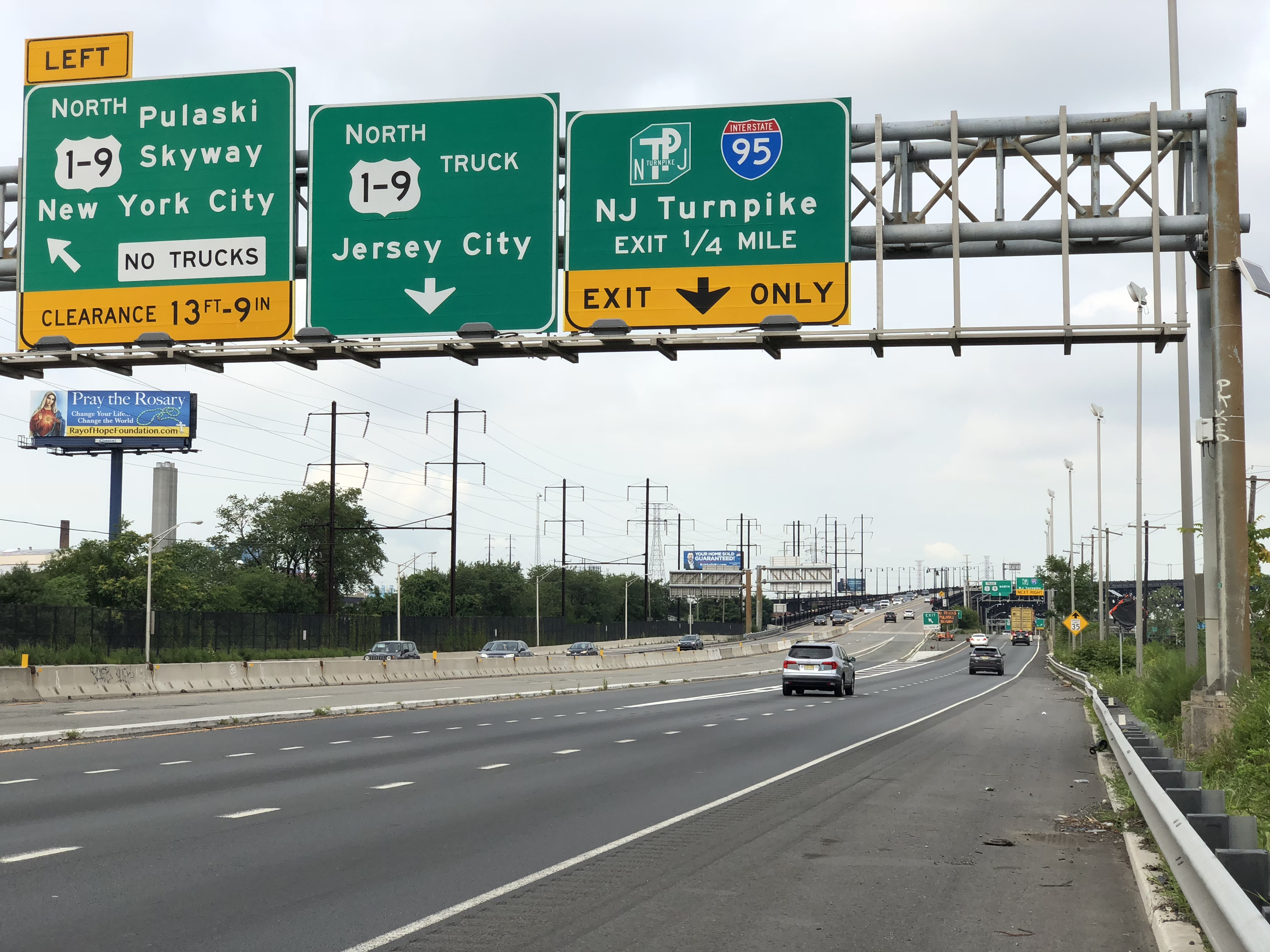
US 1/9 northbound at the beginning of US 1/9 Truck in Newark, with sign noting "No Trucks" on the approach to the Pulaski Skyway

US 1/9 continues into Newark, Essex County, with several ramps providing access to the airport as well as to McClellan Street and Haynes Avenue; the freeway also passes under the AirTrain Newark monorail line. At the north end of the airport property, the road reaches the large Newark Airport Interchange, where it has connections to I-78, US 22 westbound, and Route 21 northbound. Within this interchange, US 1/9 first has ramps to I-78, US 22, and Route 21 before turning east to parallel I-78 briefly prior to having more connections to I-78 as well as to Port Newark. Past the crossing of I-78, US 1/9 continues north, with the lanes splitting as it passes over the CSAO's Greenville Running Track, Lehigh Line, and Newark and Passaic Industrial Track at Oak Island Yard before coming to a northbound exit and southbound entrance with Delancy and South streets. The freeway continues through industrial areas as it comes to a southbound exit and northbound entrance for Wilson Avenue. Following this interchange, the directions of US 1/9 rejoin as the freeway continues northeast, with CSAO's Passaic and Harsimus Line running closely parallel to the northwest of the road. Along this stretch, the roadway comes to a bridge over CSAO's Newark and New York Industrial Track and Manufacturers Industrial Track lines. The local–express lane configuration of US 1/9 ends at an interchange with US 1/9 Truck and Raymond Boulevard that provides access to the New Jersey Turnpike (I-95). At this point, US 1/9 becomes the four-lane divided Pulaski Skyway. Trucks are banned from using the Pulaski Skyway and have to use US 1/9 Truck to bypass it.

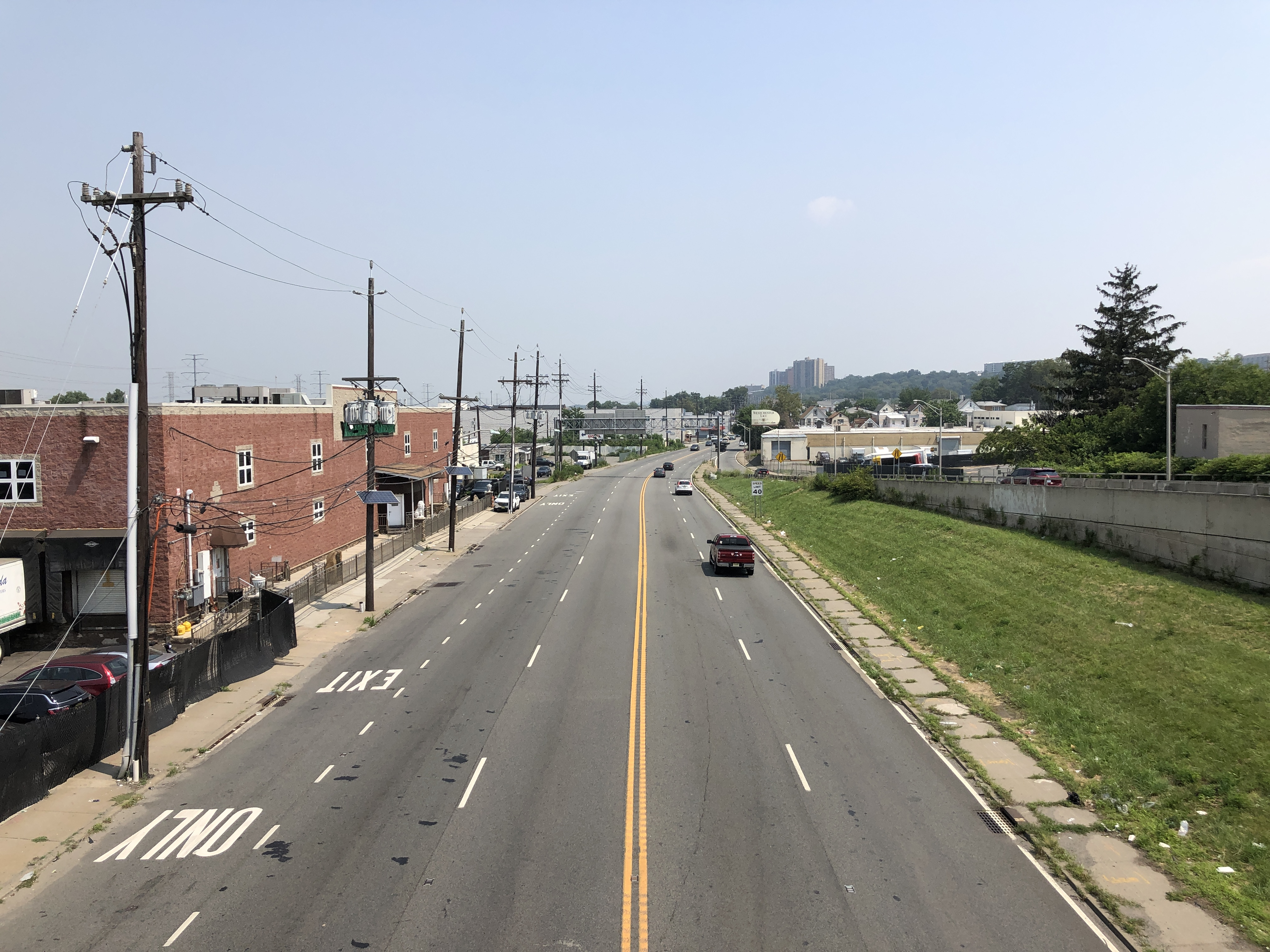
US 1/9 northbound in North Bergen

The Pulaski Skyway carries US 1/9 between Newark and Jersey City. The skyway crosses the Passaic River into Kearny, Hudson County, where it passes over industrial areas and a Conrail Shared Assets Operations railroad spur, and the Hackensack River into Jersey City. In Jersey City, the skyway passes over PATH's Newark–World Trade Center line and CSAO's Northern Branch line before heading over US 1/9 Truck and the Northern Branch line again. At the east end of the Pulaski Skyway, US 1/9 reaches the Tonnele Circle, where it intersects with the northern terminus of US 1/9 Truck as well as the western terminus of Route 139. Here, US 1/9 head north on four-lane divided surface road called Tonnele Avenue, named for local landowner and politician John Tonnelé. The road passes over NJ Transit's Morris & Essex Lines and then CSAO's National Docks Secondary line before running through urban areas. It turns more to the north-northeast before reaching an interchange with Secaucus Road (CR 678). At this point, US 1/9 crosses into North Bergen. In this area, the road crosses over Amtrak's Northeast Corridor and coming to a channelized intersection with the eastern terminus of Route 3 that also provides access to eastbound Route 495. A short distance later, US 1/9 becomes a four-lane undivided road and reaches a partial interchange with Route 495; the only direct connection available is a ramp from westbound Route 495 to southbound US 1/9. After this, the road comes to a diamond interchange with Union Turnpike (CR 676) and Paterson Plank Road (CR 681). From this point, US 1/9 continues north-northeast, crossing NJ Transit's Hudson–Bergen Light Rail near the line's northern terminus at the Tonnelle Avenue Station. Past this station, the road runs to the east of CSX's North Bergen Yard and is still lined with businesses.

=== Bergen County ===
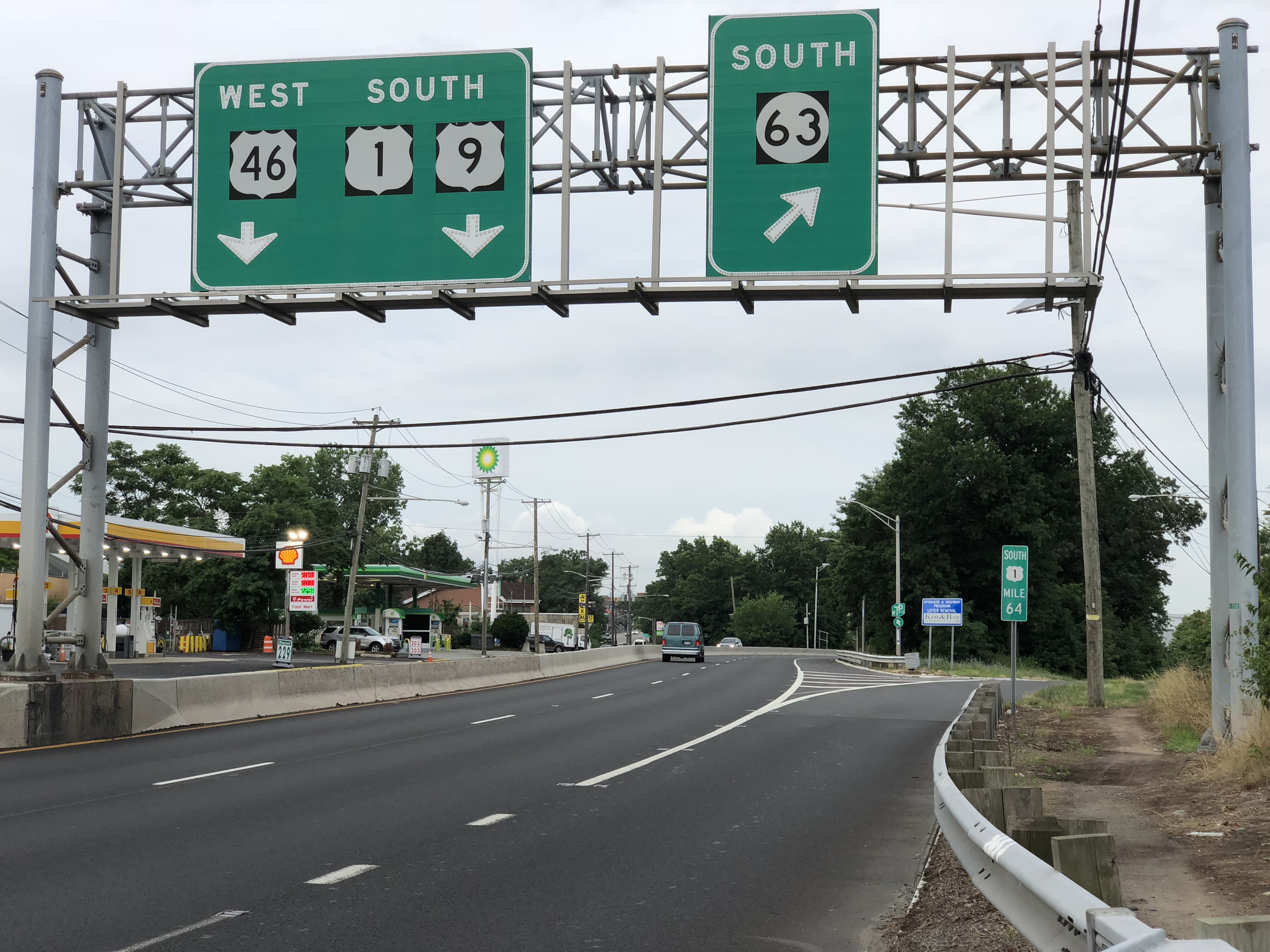
US 1/9 southbound and US 46 westbound at Route 63 interchange in Fort Lee

US 1/9 continues into Fairview, Bergen County, where the name changes to Broad Avenue. Shortly after entering Fairview, the route passes over the New York, Susquehanna and Western Railway's Edgewater Branch line, where it is briefly a divided highway. Turning north, the road passes more suburban areas before continuing into Ridgefield. In Ridgefield, US 1/9 becomes a divided highway prior to intersecting with southern terminus of Route 93. The median ends after this intersection, and the road turns northeast into mostly residential neighborhoods with a few businesses, intersecting with the western terminus of Route 5. Past Route 5, US 1/9 continues into Palisades Park, in a mile-long (1.6 km) district known as Koreantown. It soon reaches an interchange with US 46.

At this point, US 1/9 turns east off Broad Avenue to merge onto US 46, which is a four-lane divided highway. The highway makes a sharp turn to the north-northeast and has partial interchanges at both ends of the 5th and 6th streets frontage roads, which parallel the highway through residential areas and provide access to East Central Boulevard (CR 501). US 1/9/US 46 continues into Fort Lee, where it has access to a couple commercial areas before encountering the northern terminus of Route 63 at a westbound exit and eastbound entrance. The highway continues past more businesses and homes, angling northeast as it comes to an exit for Main Street (CR 56). Immediately past this point, the road turns east and encounters a complex interchange with I-95, the eastern terminus of Route 4, and the southern terminus of US 9W. Here, US 1/9/US 46 all join I-95 and continue to the southeast along a multilane freeway with local–express lane configuration consisting of four local lanes and four express lanes in each direction, passing numerous highrise buildings as it heads east to the George Washington Bridge over the Hudson River.

=== New York City ===
At the New Jersey–New York state line on the bridge, US 46 ends and I-95 and US 1/9 continue into the borough of Manhattan in New York City. On the east bank of the river, the road passes over Amtrak's Empire Connection line. After an interchange with the Henry Hudson Parkway (NY 9A), the US 1/9 concurrency ends, and US 9 leaves the expressway at an interchange with Broadway at the George Washington Bridge Bus Station in Washington Heights. At that interchange, US 9 heads north on Broadway, while I-95/US 1 continues east (north) into The Bronx.

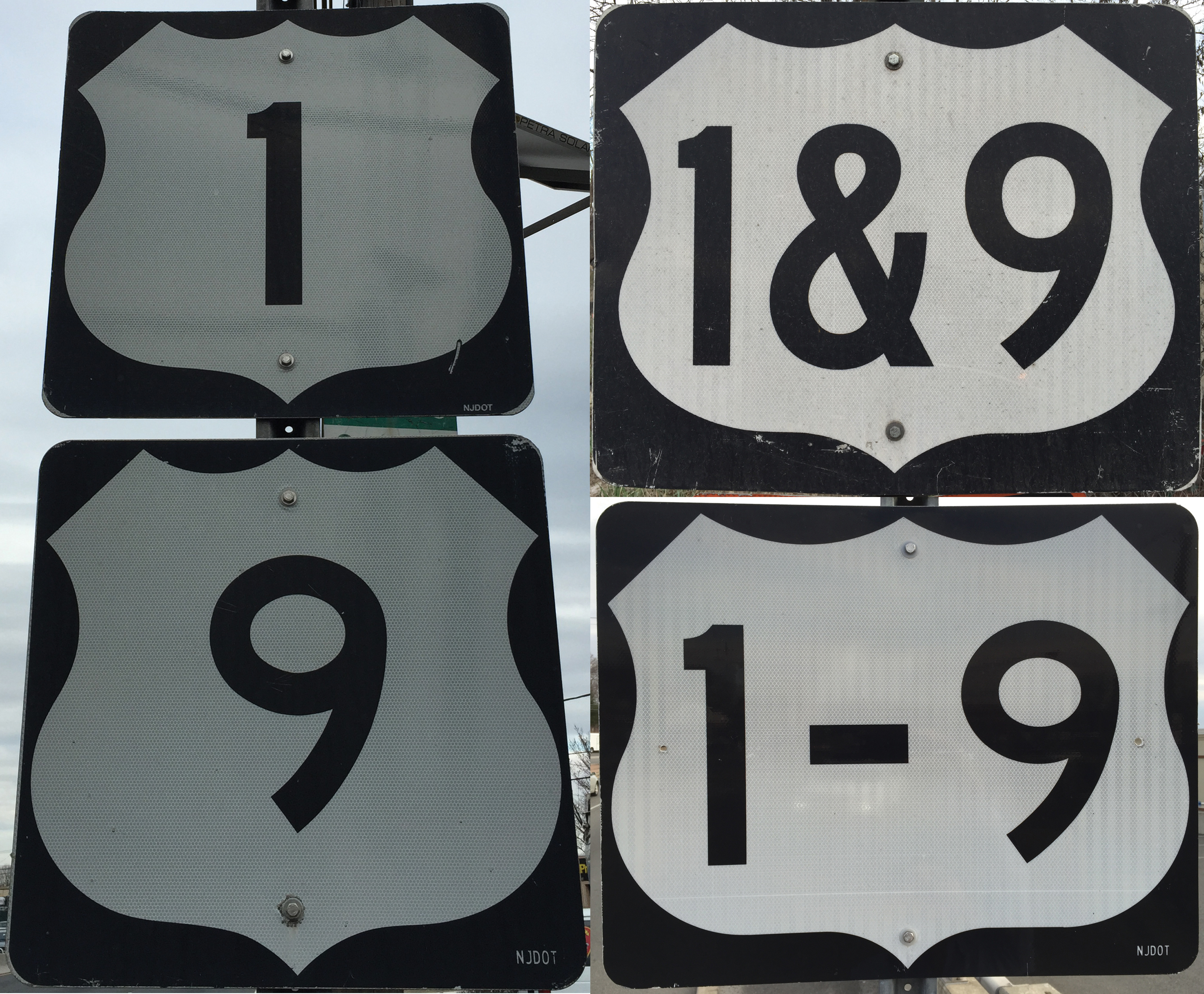
Alternative signage methods for the concurrency: Left: Separate shields Upper right: Combined using an ampersand, mostly phased out Lower right: Combined using a dash, mostly new signage

== History ==
What is now the US 1/9 concurrency between Woodbridge and Elizabeth was first legislated as the northernmost part of Route 1 in 1916, a route that was to continue south to Trenton. In 1922, an extension of Route 1 was legislated to continue north from Elizabeth to the Holland Tunnel in Jersey City. This extension was planned to be the first superhighway in the U.S., with much of it opening in 1928. As a result of the creation of the U.S. Highway System in 1926, US 1 and US 9 were designated through northern New Jersey, sharing a concurrency from the current intersection of Route 27 and Route 35 in Rahway and continuing north on present-day Route 27 (then a part of Route 1) to Newark, then turning east, eventually following what is now US 1/9 Truck toward Jersey City, where US 1 was to head for the Holland Tunnel and US 9 was to turn north to run near the west bank of the Hudson River. A year later, in the 1927 New Jersey state highway renumbering, Route 1 between New Brunswick and Elizabeth became part of Route 27 while the Route 1 extension became part of Route 25. In addition, the current alignment of US 1/9 between the Tonnele Circle and Fort Lee, which at the time was a part of US 9, became part of Route 1 while the approach to the George Washington Bridge became a part of Route 6.

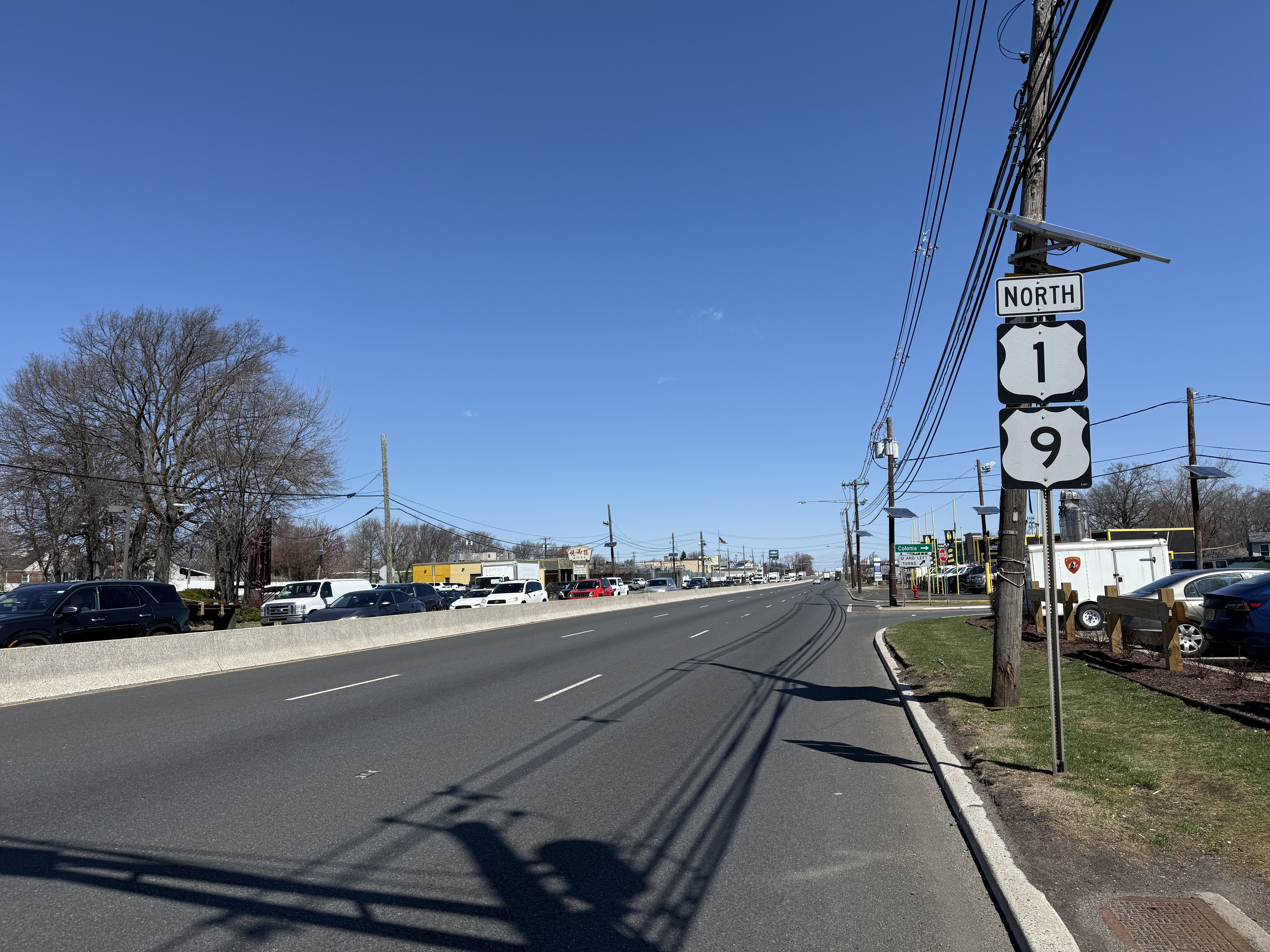
US 1/9 northbound past CR 650 in Woodbridge Township

In 1932, the Pulaski Skyway was opened to traffic, and US 1/9 were designated to use it along with Route 25.

In 1934, trucks were banned from the Pulaski Skyway, and a truck bypass of the structure called Route 25T was created.

By 1937, US 1/9 was moved to follow Route 25 south to Woodbridge instead of Route 27.

By 1941, the US 1/9 alignment was moved to its current location north the Tonnele Circle, following Route 1 and Route 6 to the George Washington Bridge into New York City. In the vicinity of the George Washington Bridge, the route also ran concurrently with US 46. In addition, US 9 was built to connect to US 1 in Woodbridge on its current alignment (then designated Route 35) instead of using Route 4 (the current Route 35).

As part of construction of the New Jersey Turnpike, a new interchange was built to connect to the road, this replaced the existing turn circle in the area, which had grown functionally obsolete with increased traffic.

In the 1953 New Jersey state highway renumbering, the state highways running concurrently with US 1/9 were removed, while Route 25T became US 1/9 Truck and Route 25 between the Tonnele Circle and the Holland Tunnel became US 1/9 Business (now Route 139).

The New Jersey Turnpike interchange was expanded from 1955 to 1956.

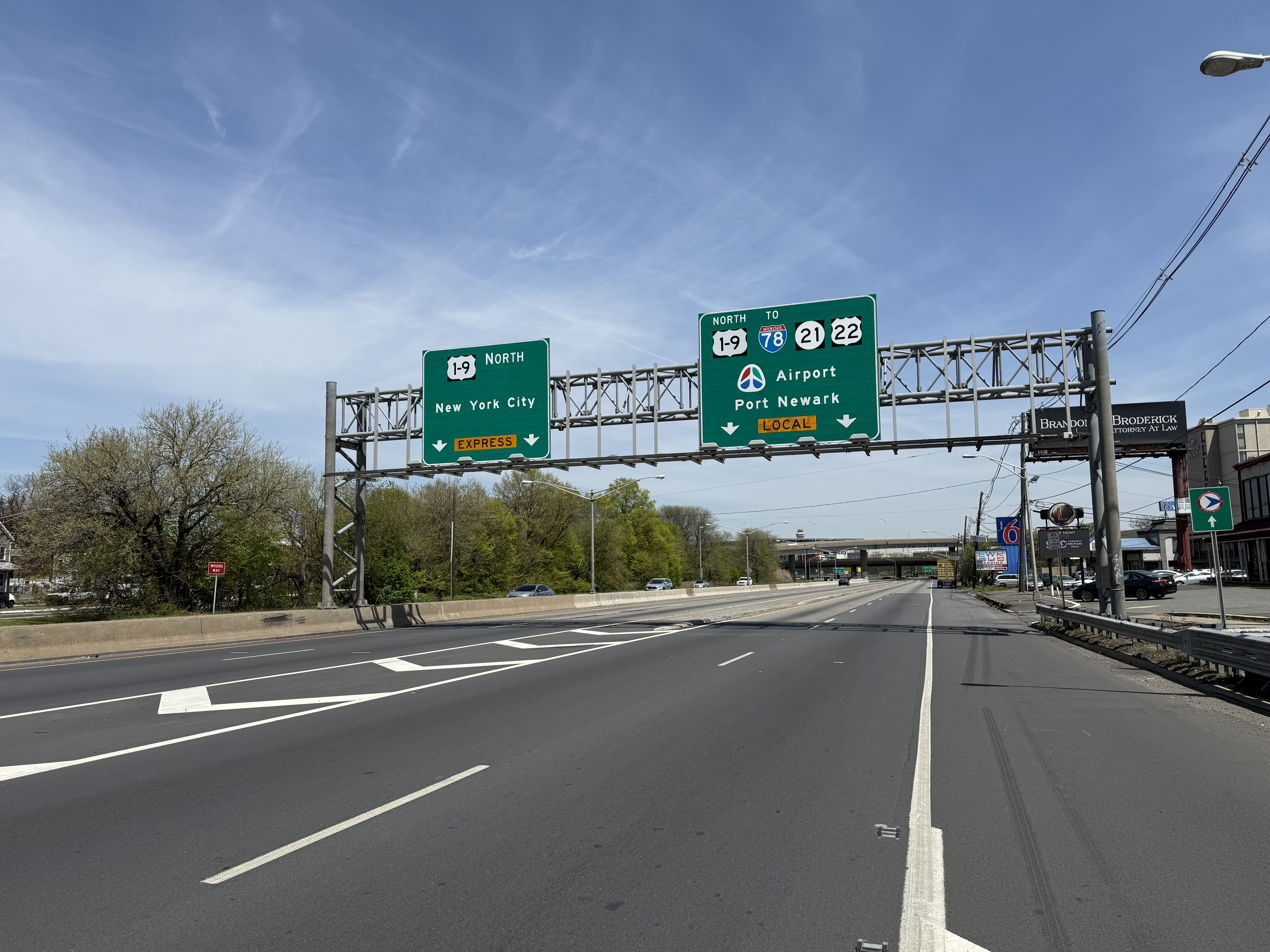
US 1/9 northbound past North Avenue in Elizabeth

From 1958 to 1964, the portion of road near and over the George Washington Bridge, which were shared with US 46 on the New Jersey side, were rebuilt into a freeway that became a part of I-95.

From 1966 to 1970 a new interchange was built to serve I-78, while the existing New Jersey Turnpike interchange was reconstructed to connect to it.

The interchange with Route 81 was completed in 1981.

Between February 2006 and November 2008, the cloverleaf interchange with Route 35 in Woodbridge, the first in the U.S. built in 1929 when this portion of US 1/9 was a part of Route 25, was replaced with a partial cloverleaf interchange, costing $34 million (equivalent to $48.5 million in 2024).

In 2013, US 1/9 was one of two main thoroughfares in Hudson County (the other being Kennedy Boulevard) that were listed among the Tri-State Transportation Campaign's list of the top 10 most dangerous roads for pedestrians in New Jersey, New York, and Connecticut. US 1/9, which tied for the #10 place on the list, was cited for the five pedestrian fatalities that occurred on it from 2009 to 2011.

== Major intersections ==
Mileposts in New Jersey follow the consecutive mileposts from US 1.

State	County	Location	mi	km	Exit	Destinations	Notes
New Jersey	Middlesex	Woodbridge Township	35.89	57.76		US 1 south – Trenton US 9 south – Shore Points	Interchange; US 1-9 south splits into US 1 and US 9
New Jersey	Middlesex	Woodbridge Township	36.42	58.61		Route 35 – The Amboys, Rahway	Interchange
New Jersey	Middlesex	Woodbridge Township	37.76	60.77		South Inman Avenue / Rodgers Street	Interchange
New Jersey	Union	Rahway	38.85	62.52		CR 514 – Rahway, Woodbridge	Southbound exit and entrance; interchange
New Jersey	Union	Linden	42.30	68.08		I-278 east to I-95 Toll / N.J. Turnpike – Goethals Bridge, Staten Island	Northbound exit and southbound entrance; interchange; western terminus of I-278
New Jersey	Union	Elizabeth	43.11	69.38		Route 439 (Bayway/South Elmora Avenue) – Roselle, Plainfield, Staten Island, Goethals Bridge	Bayway Circle
New Jersey	Union	Elizabeth	43.82	70.52		Pearl Street	Entrances only; former CR 614; interchange
New Jersey	Union	Elizabeth	44.14	71.04		Elizabeth Avenue	Southbound exit and northbound entrance; interchange
New Jersey	Union	Elizabeth	44.64	71.84		Magnolia Avenue	Interchange via connector roads
New Jersey	Union	Elizabeth	45.30	72.90		US 1-9 (Express Lanes)	Southbound entrance only; interchange; southern end of express lanes
New Jersey	Union	Elizabeth	45.44	73.13		North Avenue east to I-95 Toll / N.J. Turnpike	Northbound access only
New Jersey	Union	Elizabeth	45.44	73.13		US 1-9 north (Express Lanes) – New York City	Northbound exit only; interchange
New Jersey	Union	Elizabeth	45.44	73.13	Southern end of freeway section		
New Jersey	Union	Elizabeth	45.44	73.13	—	North Avenue west	Southbound exit only; access to NJ Transit North Elizabeth Station
New Jersey	Union	Elizabeth	45.73	73.60	—	To I-95 Toll / N.J. Turnpike / Dowd Avenue / North Avenue – Elizabeth Seaport	No northbound exit; access via Route 81
New Jersey	Union	Elizabeth	46.00	74.03	—	Newark Liberty International Airport	Northbound exit only; Newark Airport Interchange
New Jersey	Essex	Newark	46.28	74.48	—	McClellan Street	
New Jersey	Essex	Newark	46.28	74.48	Northern end of freeway section		
New Jersey	Essex	Newark				US 1-9 south (Express Lanes)	Southbound exit only; interchange
New Jersey	Essex	Newark	46.76	75.25		I-78 to I-95 Toll / N.J. Turnpike Haynes Avenue (U-turn)	No southbound exit; Newark Airport Interchange; exit 58A on I-78
New Jersey	Essex	Newark				Weigh station	Southbound exit and entrance only; interchange
New Jersey	Essex	Newark	47.11	75.82		Newark Liberty International Airport	Southbound exit and entrance for express lanes only; Newark Airport Interchange
New Jersey	Essex	Newark	47.11	75.82		Newark Liberty International Airport	No northbound exit; Newark Airport Interchange
New Jersey	Essex	Newark	47.38	76.25		US 1-9 north to I-78 – North Area, South Area, Port Newark	No northbound exit; interchange
New Jersey	Essex	Newark	47.64	76.67	Southern end of freeway section		
New Jersey	Essex	Newark	47.64– 47.84	76.67– 76.99	—	US 22 west / Route 21 north – Union, Hillside, Newark, Downtown Newark	Newark Airport Interchange; eastern terminus of US 22; southern terminus of Route 21
New Jersey	Essex	Newark	47.64– 47.84	76.67– 76.99	—	US 22 west / Route 21 north – Newark, Downtown Newark	Northbound exit and entrance for express lanes only; eastern terminus of US 22; southern terminus of Route 21
New Jersey	Essex	Newark	47.99	77.23	—	I-78 to I-95 Toll / N.J. Turnpike – Holland Tunnel, Clinton	Northbound exit and southbound entrance; Newark Airport Interchange; exits 58A-B on I-78
New Jersey	Essex	Newark			—	US 1-9 south (Express Lanes) – Main Terminals	Southbound exit only
New Jersey	Essex	Newark			—	Executive Drive to I-78 / I-95 Toll / N.J. Turnpike	Southbound exit and entrance
New Jersey	Essex	Newark			—	Port Newark, North Area, South Area, Economy Parking	Newark Airport Interchange; southbound access via exit for I-78 west
New Jersey	Essex	Newark	48.62– 48.90	78.25– 78.70	—	I-78 to I-95 Toll / N.J. Turnpike / G.S. Parkway – Port Newark, North Area, Air Cargo	No northbound access to I-78 west; exit 58B on I-78; Newark Airport Interchange
New Jersey	Essex	Newark	49.11	79.03	—	Frontage Road	Northbound exit and entrance
New Jersey	Essex	Newark			—	US 1-9 (Express Lanes)	Northbound entrance only
New Jersey	Essex	Newark	49.46	79.60	—	South Street	Southbound entrance only
New Jersey	Essex	Newark	49.55	79.74	—	Delancy Street – Newark	Northbound exit and southbound entrance
New Jersey	Essex	Newark	49.91	80.32	—	Wilson Avenue – Newark	Southbound exit and northbound entrance
New Jersey	Essex	Newark	50.73	81.64	—	Roanoke Avenue	Northbound entrance only
New Jersey	Essex	Newark	51.43	82.77	—	I-95 Toll / N.J. Turnpike north / US 1-9 Truck – Jersey City	Northbound exit and southbound entrance; all trucks must exit; southern terminus of US 1-9 Truck; exit 15E on I-95 / Turnpike
New Jersey	Essex	Newark			—	US 1-9 south (Express Lanes) – Newark Airport, Elizabeth	Northern terminus of express lanes
New Jersey	Essex	Newark	51.43	82.77	—	Raymond Boulevard – Newark	Southbound exit and southbound entrance
New Jersey	Passaic River		51.85	83.44	Pulaski Skyway		
New Jersey	Hudson	Kearny	52.33	84.22	—	South Kearny	Southbound exit and northbound entrance; access via Adams Street
New Jersey	Hudson	Hackensack River	53.06	85.39	Pulaski Skyway		
New Jersey	Hudson	Jersey City	54.00	86.90	—	Broadway	Northbound exit and southbound entrance
New Jersey	Hudson	Jersey City	54.61	87.89	—	US 1-9 Truck south / Route 139 east to Route 7 west – Hoboken, Holland Tunnel Tonnele Avenue – Jersey City	No northbound access to US 1-9 Truck; all trucks must exit; Tonnele Circle
New Jersey	Hudson	Jersey City	54.61	87.89	Northern end of freeway section		
New Jersey	Hudson	Jersey City	56.24	90.51		Secaucus Road – Jersey City (U-turn)	Interchange; access via CR 678
New Jersey	Hudson	North Bergen	57.27	92.17		Route 3 west / Route 495 east to I-95 Toll / N.J. Turnpike – Clifton, Lincoln Tunnel	No northbound entrance; eastern terminus of Route 3
New Jersey	Hudson	North Bergen	57.74	92.92		Paterson Plank Road / West Side Avenue / Union Turnpike	Interchange; access via CR 681 / CR 676
New Jersey	Bergen	Ridgefield	62.14	100.00		Route 93 north (Grand Avenue)	Southern terminus of Route 93
New Jersey	Bergen	Ridgefield	62.51	100.60		Route 5 east	Western terminus of Route 5
New Jersey	Bergen	Palisades Park	62.80	101.07		US 46 west to I-95 Toll south / N.J. Turnpike south / I-80 west	Interchange; southern end of US 46 concurrency
New Jersey	Bergen	Palisades Park	63.51	102.21		CR 501 (East Central Boulevard) – Palisades Park	Interchange; access via 5th/6th Streets
New Jersey	Bergen	Fort Lee	63.95	102.92		Route 63 south	Interchange; southbound exit and northbound entrance; northern terminus of Route 63
New Jersey	Bergen	Fort Lee	64.49	103.79		Main Street (CR 56) – Fort Lee, Leonia	Interchange
New Jersey	Bergen	Fort Lee	64.88	104.41	Southern end of freeway section		
New Jersey	Bergen	Fort Lee	64.88	104.41		US 9W north / Route 4 west to Palisades Parkway north – Fort Lee	Northbound exit and southbound entrance; Route 4 not signed
New Jersey	Bergen	Fort Lee	65.30	105.09	72B	I-95 south / N.J. Turnpike south / Route 4 west to I-80 west / G.S. Parkway – Hackensack, Paterson	Southbound exit and northbound entrance; southern end of I-95 concurrency; northern terminus of N.J. Turnpike; eastern terminus of Route 4
New Jersey	Bergen	Fort Lee	65.46	105.35	73	Route 67 / Hudson Terrace (CR 505) to US 9W / Palisades Parkway north – Fort Lee	Signed for US 9W/Hudson Terrace southbound, Palisades northbound; last northbound exit before toll
New Jersey	Bergen	Fort Lee	65.60	105.57	74	Palisades Parkway north	Southbound exit and northbound entrance from express lanes; southern terminus of Palisades Parkway
Hudson River			66.06 0.00	106.31 0.00	George Washington Bridge (northbound toll) US 46 ends		
New York	New York	New York	0.55	0.89	1A	I-95 north (US 1 north) to I-87; NY 9A / Henry Hudson Parkway / West 178th Street (US 9 north)	US 1-9 north splits into US 1 and US 9; exit 14 on Henry Hudson Parkway
1.000 mi = 1.609 km; 1.000 km = 0.621 mi: Concurrency terminus; Incomplete access; Tolled; Route transition

== Related routes ==
- U.S. Route 1/9 Truck
- New Jersey Route 139, formerly designated US 1/9 Business
