= List of highways numbered 630 =

The following highways are numbered 630:

== United States ==
- Interstate 630
- U.S. Route 630 (former)
  - U.S. Route 630 (Utah) former proposal)
- Florida State Road 630 (former)
  - County Road 630 (Indian River County, Florida)
- Hawaii Route 630 (former)
- Kentucky Route 630
- Louisiana Highway 630 (former)
- Maryland Route 630 (former)
- County Route 630 (Burlington County, New Jersey)
  - County Route 630 (Camden County, New Jersey)
  - County Route 630 (Cape May County, New Jersey)
  - County Route 630 (Cumberland County, New Jersey)
  - County Route 630 (Essex County, New Jersey)
  - County Route 630 (Gloucester County, New Jersey)
  - County Route 630 (Hudson County, New Jersey)
  - County Route 630 (Mercer County, New Jersey)
  - County Route 630 (Middlesex County, New Jersey)
  - County Route 630 (Morris County, New Jersey)
  - County Route 630 (Ocean County, New Jersey)
  - County Route 630 (Passaic County, New Jersey)
  - County Route 630 (Salem County, New Jersey)
  - County Route 630 (Somerset County, New Jersey)
  - County Route 630 (Sussex County, New Jersey)
  - County Route 630 (Union County, New Jersey)
  - County Route 630 (Warren County, New Jersey)
- Ohio State Route 630
- Farm to Market Road 630
- Virginia State Route 630
  - Virginia State Route 630 (1930-1933) (former)

Territories

- Puerto Rico Highway 630

Preceded by 629	Lists of highways 630	Succeeded by 631
