= List of highways numbered 628 =

The following highways are numbered 628:

== United States ==
- County Route 628 (Burlington County, New Jersey)
- County Route 628 (Camden County, New Jersey)
- County Route 628 (Cape May County, New Jersey)
- County Route 628 (Cumberland County, New Jersey)
- County Route 628 (Essex County, New Jersey)
- County Route 628 (Gloucester County, New Jersey)
- County Route 628 (Hudson County, New Jersey)
- County Route 628 (Hunterdon County, New Jersey)
- County Route 628 (Middlesex County, New Jersey)
- County Route 628 (Morris County, New Jersey)
- County Route 628 (Passaic County, New Jersey)
- County Route 628 (Salem County, New Jersey)
- County Route 628 (Somerset County, New Jersey)
- County Route 628 (Sussex County, New Jersey)
- County Route 628 (Union County, New Jersey)
- County Route 628 (Warren County, New Jersey)
- PR-628
- SR 628

Preceded by 627	Lists of highways 628	Succeeded by 629
