= Eisenhower Parkway =

Highway in New Jersey

County Route 609
- Eisenhower Parkway

Route information
- Maintained by Essex County
- Length: 4.53 mi (7.29 km)
- Component highways: CR 609 from Livingston to Roseland

Major junctions
- South end: CR 510 in Livingston
- Route 10 / CR 508 in Livingston; I-280 in Roseland
- North end: Dead end in Roseland

Location
- Country: United States
- State: New Jersey
- County: Essex

Highway system
- County Routes in Essex County; System; 500-series routes
← CR 608	→ CR 610

Eisenhower Parkway is a road in Essex County, New Jersey, located in the municipalities of Roseland and Livingston. Eisenhower Parkway begins at South Orange Avenue (County Route 510) in Livingston near the Livingston Mall and heads north, following County Route 609 (CR 609) to Interstate 280 (I-280) in Roseland. At this interchange, the CR 609 designation ends and the road continues northeast to a dead end a short distance later. Eisenhower Parkway was planned to continue further north to Route 46 in Fairfield and further south to Route 24 in Chatham, with the latter extension to be called Triborough Road. An abandoned cloverleaf interchange exists where Triborough Road was to intersect Route 24. Several proposals have been generated to complete the northern half into West Caldwell.

== Route description ==
Eisenhower Parkway begins at an intersection with CR 510 in Livingston, Essex County, heading north as a four-lane divided expressway. The road passes Livingston Mall before becoming a four-lane undivided expressway and passing to the east of the Commonwealth Water Company Reservoir Number Three. Upon turning northeast, the roadway becomes divided again as it crosses CR 607 and passes through forests. Eisenhower Parkway intersects Route 10 at the modified Livingston Circle, at which point the road becomes a four-lane arterial road and passes businesses as CR 661 branches to the east of the road. The highway heads north-northeast through more forested areas with occasional commercial development, meeting CR 661 again prior to crossing into Roseland. Here, the road crosses the Morristown and Erie Railway's Whippany Line and passes businesses, crossing CR 611 prior to coming to a cloverleaf interchange with I-280. At this interchange, the CR 609 designation ends and Eisenhower Parkway continues northeast to a dead end a short distance later.

== History ==
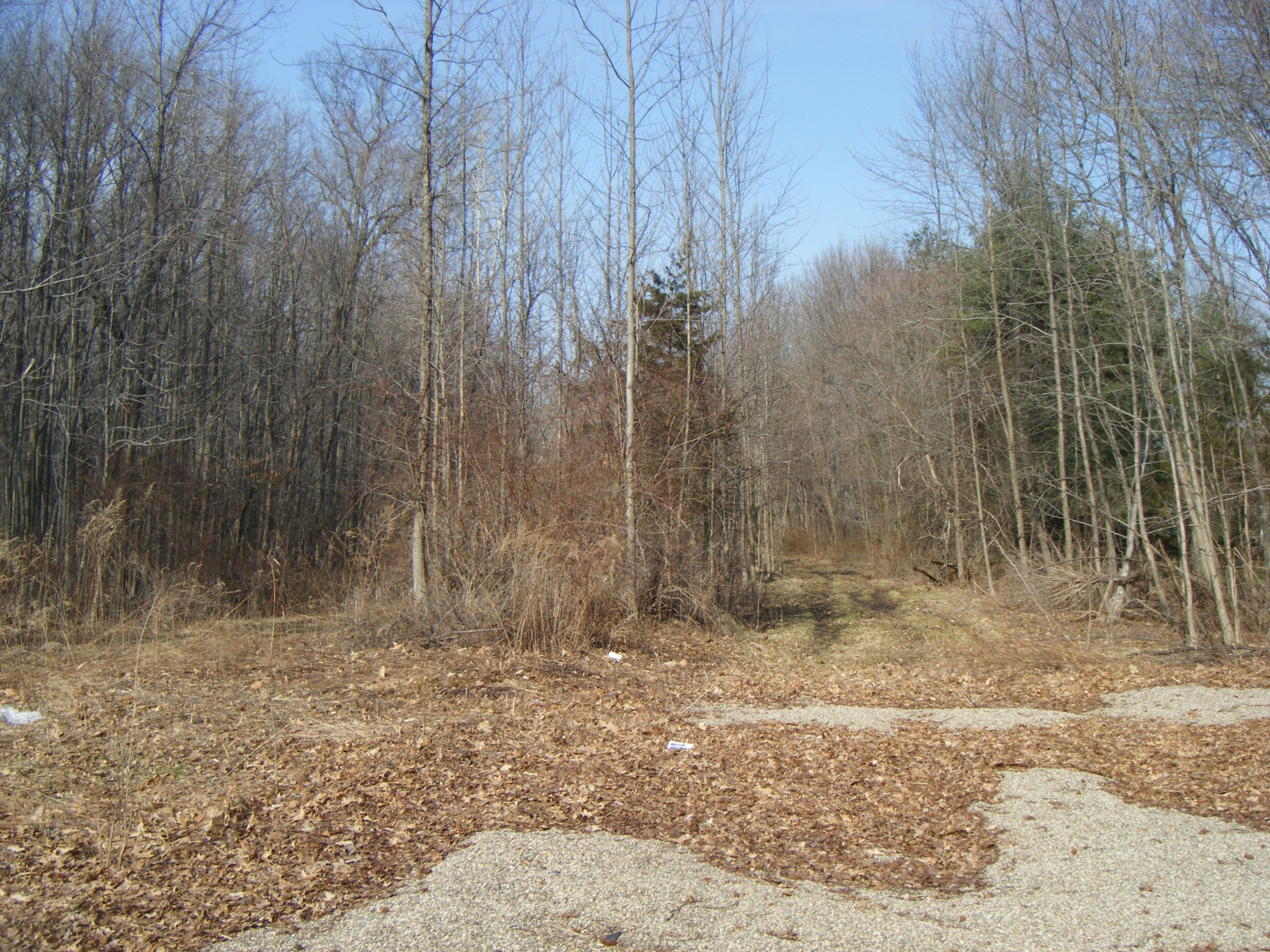
The abandoned right-of-way of what was to be a northern extension of Eisenhower Parkway in Roseland

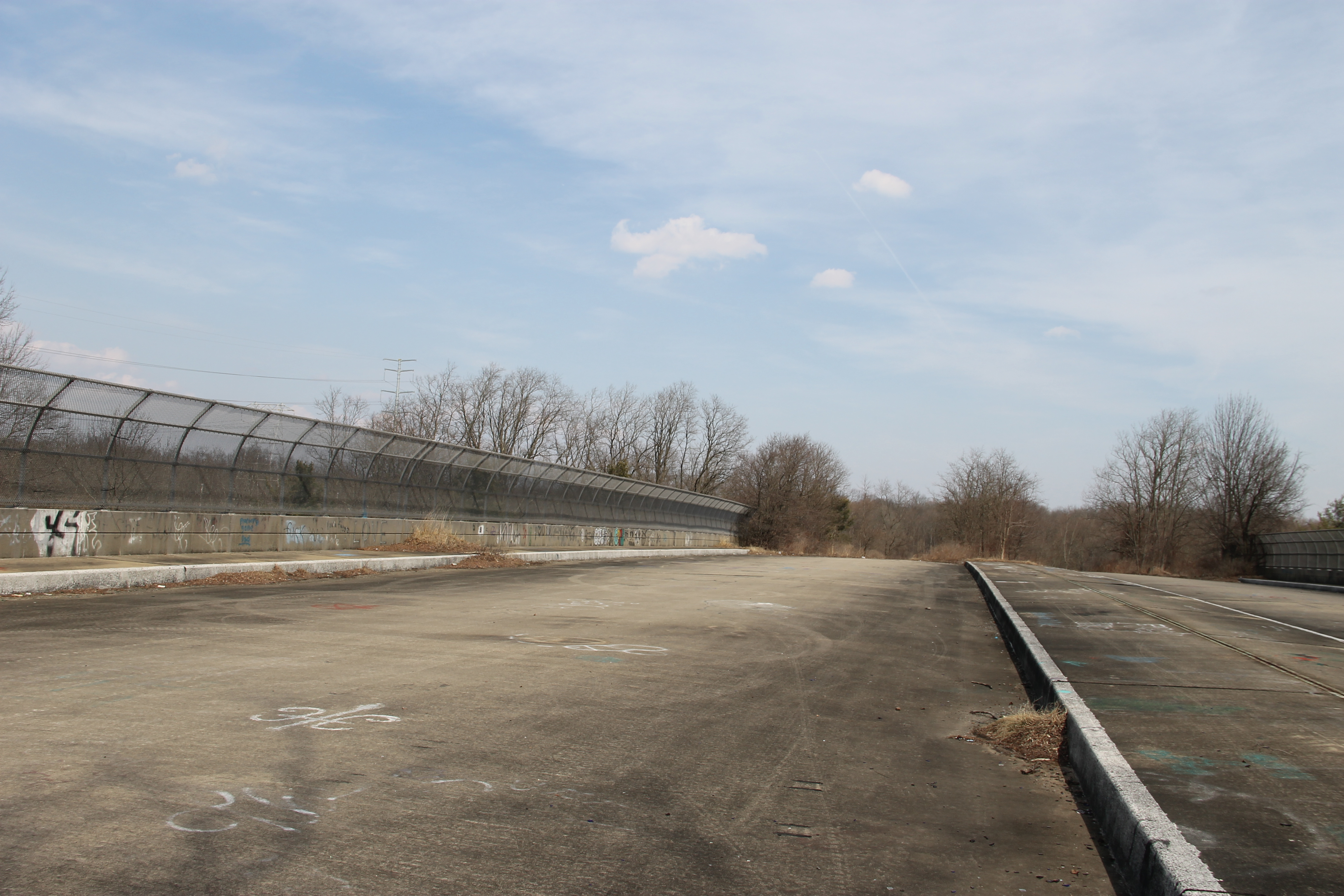
View on top of the abandoned bridge over Route 24 in March 2014.

The original plan of the Parkway was to extend to Bloomfield Avenue in West Caldwell on the northern end and to Route 124 in Chatham on the southern end. There is a complete cloverleaf interchange at where the parkway would have met Route 24, which would have been Interchange 5 on 24 (and there were once blank signs erected on 24 West). The interchange was left abandoned since it does not connect to a road, and many plants have grown over the abandoned pavement. The bridge over Route 24, which would have been part of Eisenhower Parkway, as well as what would've been the entrance and exit ramps, cannot be accessed by vehicle but are easy to reach by foot or bike. Hikers and bikers must go north along the power lines from the intersection of Brooklake Road and Delbarton Drive until they reach the fence along Route 24, then follow the fence east for about half a mile. NJDOT gave the abandoned overpass a different street name, Triborough Road, suggesting that the southern extension of Eisenhower Parkway would use that name instead. To this day, there is still a sign that reads "Triborough Road" hanging from the abandoned overpass. The abandoned interchange is at mile marker 5.70 on Route 24.

== Major intersections ==
The entire route is in Essex County.

Location	mi	km	Destinations	Notes
Livingston	0.00	0.00	CR 510 (South Orange Avenue) – Chatham, Millburn, Morristown CR 609 begins	Southern terminus; southern terminus of CR 609; at-grade intersection
Livingston	0.96	1.54	CR 607 (Walnut Street)	At-grade intersection
Livingston	1.71– 1.76	2.75– 2.83	Northern end of limited-access section	
Livingston	1.71– 1.76	2.75– 2.83	Route 10 (Mount Pleasant Avenue) / CR 508 east (West Northfield Avenue) – Whippany, Newark, The Oranges	Livingston Circle; western terminus of CR 508
Livingston	1.96	3.15	CR 661 north (Beaufort Avenue)	Southern terminus of CR 661
Livingston	3.18	5.12	CR 661 south (Beaufort Avenue)	Northern terminus of CR 661
Roseland	3.73	6.00	CR 611 (Eagle Rock Avenue) – Hanover, Roseland, The Caldwells, The Oranges	
Roseland	4.12	6.63	I-280 to N.J. Turnpike (I-95) / G.S. Parkway CR 609 ends	Cloverleaf interchange; exits 4A-B on I-280; northern terminus of CR 609
Roseland	4.53	7.29	Dead end	Northern terminus
1.000 mi = 1.609 km; 1.000 km = 0.621 mi: Concurrency terminus
