= List of highways numbered 629 =

The following highways are numbered 629:

== United States ==
- County Route 629 (Atlantic County, New Jersey)
- County Route 629 (Burlington County, New Jersey)
- County Route 629 (Camden County, New Jersey)
- County Route 629 (Cape May County, New Jersey)
- County Route 629 (Cumberland County, New Jersey)
- County Route 629 (Essex County, New Jersey)
- County Route 629 (Gloucester County, New Jersey)
- County Route 629 (Hudson County, New Jersey)
- County Route 629 (Hunterdon County, New Jersey)
- County Route 629 (Mercer County, New Jersey)
- County Route 629 (Middlesex County, New Jersey)
- County Route 629 (Passaic County, New Jersey)
- County Route 629 (Salem County, New Jersey)
- County Route 629 (Somerset County, New Jersey)
- County Route 629 (Sussex County, New Jersey)
- County Route 629 (Union County, New Jersey)
- County Route 629 (Warren County, New Jersey)
- PR-629
- SR 629

| Preceded by 628 | Lists of highways 629 | Succeeded by 630 |
