= County Road 509 =

County Road 509 or County Route 509 may refer to:

- County Road 509 (Brevard County, Florida)
- County Route 509 (New Jersey)
