= List of highways numbered 627 =

The following highways are numbered 627:

== Canada ==
- Alberta Highway 627

== United States ==
- PR-627
- SR 627

Preceded by 626	Lists of highways 627	Succeeded by 628
