= Livingston Mall =

Shopping mall in Livingston New Jersey

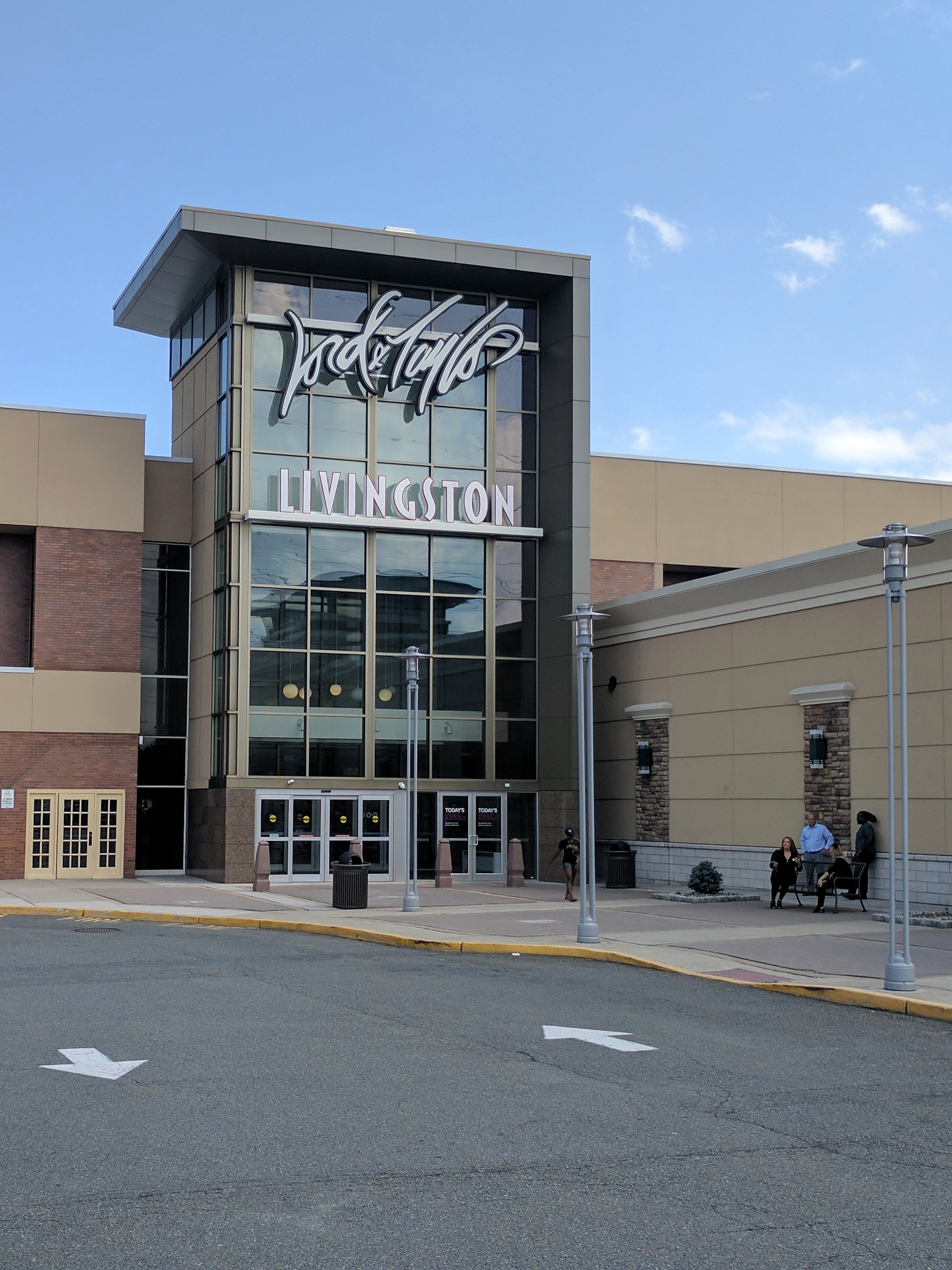
- The northwest entrance to the mall, between the former Sears location and the former Barnes & Noble location
- Location: 112 Eisenhower Pkwy; Livingston, NJ 07039
- Coordinates: 40.777°N 74.354°W
- Opened: 1972
- Closed: February 10, 2026
- Developer: N. K. Winston Corp.
- Owner: Kohan Retail Investment Group
- Architect: Charles Luckman and Associates
- Num. of stores: 0
- Num. of anchor tenants: 0 (4 vacant)
- Floor area: 968,820 sq ft (90,006 m^{2})
- Floors: 2
- Public transit: NJ Transit bus: 70, 73, 873; Community Coach bus: 77; Livingston Express Shuttle

Livingston Mall is a defunct two-level shopping mall located in Livingston, in the U.S. state of New Jersey. The mall had a gross leasable area of 968,820 sq ft (90,006 m^{2}). Located near the Passaic River close to neighboring Morris County, it served customers from Essex, Morris and Union counties.

== History ==
The center court of Livingston Mall shot in June 2022

Livingston Mall was planned in the late 1960s and opened for business in stages starting with Bamberger's in 1971, followed by the mall proper itself in 1972 with additional anchor stores Sears and Hahne & Company. The mall benefited from the migration of population in Northern New Jersey to suburban and exurban areas, and the exodus of shoppers and stores from downtown Newark, once Northern New Jersey's premiere shopping destination, but that had been in serious decline since the July 1967 race riots. Both Bamberger's and Hahne & Co. had massive flagship stores in downtown Newark at the time of the mall opening. Sears also had a store on Elizabeth Avenue in Newark's once popular South Ward.

In 1986, the Bamberger's store was converted into Macy's.

In 1989, Hahne's gave way to Lord & Taylor when its parent company, which owned both banners, decided to retire the Hahne's brand.

In 2008, the mall underwent a major renovation, which included an addition of a new food court, a new center court with a new elevator, and new entrances. Barnes & Noble and Applebee’s opened in the new wing of the mall in 2008 as part of the renovations as an expansion of the mall.

=== Decline and redevelopment ===
In February 2020, Sears announced that it would shutter as part of a plan to close 51 stores nationwide.

In August 2020, Lord & Taylor announced it would be closing the Livingston Mall location as one of 24 stores nationwide as a result of the pandemic.

A plan for the 50-year-old Livingston Mall to be refreshed was authorized by the Livingston Township in March 2021.

In 2022, Simon sold the Livingston Mall to Kohan Retail Investment Group.

Throughout Kohan’s ownership, the mall faced significant deterioration in its infrastructure over the recent years. Around 2023-2024, the mall’s HVAC system stopped working and was in need of repair, resulting in lack of air conditioning and heating. As a result, various stores (such as Old Navy, H&M, and more) either temporarily (and eventually, permanently) closed, or had their own makeshift air conditioning/heating (though they eventually closed, as well) from summer 2024 and onwards.

The parking lot is severely dilapidated, with numerous potholes prominent. In June 2025, a Florham Park resident, Laura Botwin, had her teenage son’s car badly damaged after the vehicle fell into a sinkhole. The victim later sued Kohan due to how big the pothole was, to the point the pothole was described as “a sinkhole”. Water leaks have resulted in damage and stenches of mold permeating throughout the interior of mall, as reported by shoppers. The elevator has been shut off since 2024, and most of the escalators no longer work (with the exception of the one next to the former Macy’s). The mall was described by many locals in the area and state as a "dead mall".

In March 2025, the Township Council adopted a plan for the mall to be redeveloped as high-density housing.

In September 2025, it was revealed that Kohan owed over $8.7 million on taxes across its malls in the country, with Livingston Mall on the top of the list overdue on a staggering nearly $4 million on taxes. Barry Lewis Jr., the Livingston Township Manager, said in an interview about Kohan being overdue on the taxes, saying “there hasn’t been one positive thing about the entire experience since Kohan took over in 2022.”

With the numbers of shoppers diminishing and key anchors closing, the mall has been described by December 2025 as a "zombie mall" that was "quiet, dim and stripped of the crowds" during the holiday shopping season, making the mall seem "basically dead".

In January 2026, it was announced that Barnes & Noble would be moving to the nearby Livingston Shopping Center by mid-to-late 2027. However, their moving date changed and July 15, 2026 was the store's final day at Livingston Mall. The new store will open at the Livingston Shopping Center in August 2026. That same month, Macy's announced that it would be closing as part of a plan to close 14 stores by the end of the first quarter, describing the location as "underproductive".

On February 10, 2026, the mall was closed due to a burst pipe, with “temporarily closed” notices posted on the entrances, excluding the Macy’s and Barnes & Noble. According to a post by Hidden Treasures on Facebook from February 17, stores had to remain closed the following week “due to an ongoing maintenance issue involving a burst pipe in the Livingston Mall”.

In April 2026, Macy’s closed its doors. On July 15, 2026, Barnes and Noble closed its Livingston Mall location in preparation for its relocation, leaving the mall without any establishments.

The mall’s decrepit conditions have been popular among various social media influencers, retail/mall enthusiasts, urban explorers, and more as a prime example of how some malls in the country within the past decades have declined due to lack of investment and relevancy, changing consumer habits, and oversaturation of malls built. Local police have asked teenagers and influencers not to enter the Livingston Mall following mass social media trends of breaking into the mall, with local police citing that the mall is still private property.

== Location ==
Livingston Mall is located at the intersection of Eisenhower Parkway and South Orange Avenue, and is accessible from Exit 4A off Interstate 280, Route 10, Route 24, Interstate 78, and Interstate 287. Bus service is provided by NJ Transit's 70, 73, and 873 routes. Coach USA's Community Coach 77 bus also serves the mall. The Township of Livingston operates the Livingston Express Shuttle which serves the mall and the South Orange station.
