= County Route 508 (New Jersey) =

County highway in New Jersey, U.S.

County Route 508
- CR 508 highlighted in red

Route information
- Length: 16.1 mi (25.9 km)

Major junctions
- West end: Route 10 / CR 609 in Livingston
- CR 527 in Livingston; CR 577 in West Orange; CR 509 in East Orange; Route 21 in Newark; CR 507 in Kearny; I-280 in Kearny
- East end: Route 7 in Kearny

Location
- Country: United States
- State: New Jersey
- Counties: Essex, Hudson

Highway system
- County routes in New Jersey; 500-series routes
← CR 507	→ CR 509

County Route 508 (CR 508) is a county highway in the U.S. state of New Jersey. The highway extends 16.1 miles (25.9 km) from Route 10 (Mt. Pleasant Avenue) in Livingston to Belleville Turnpike (Route 7) in Kearny.

== Route description ==
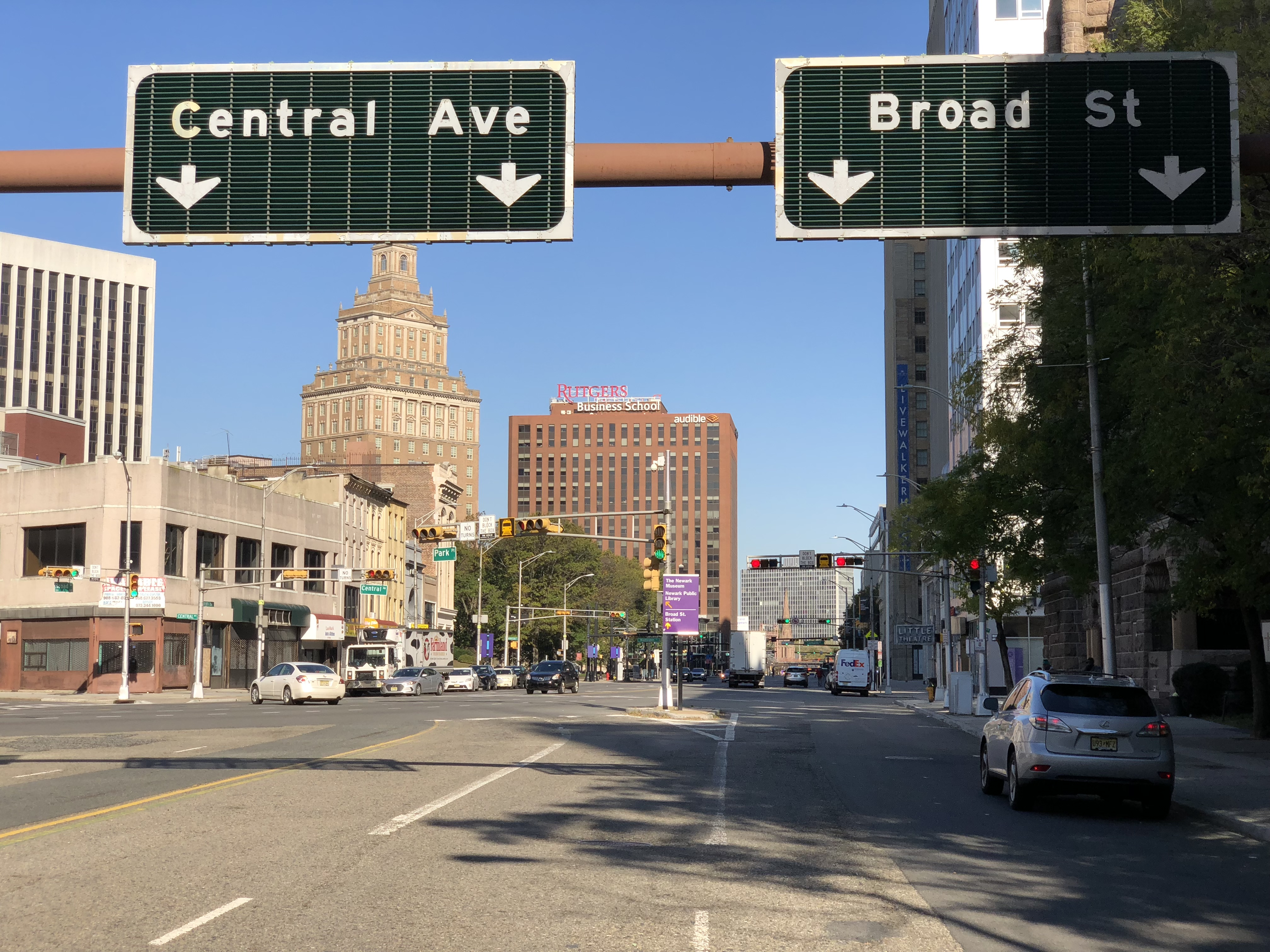
CR 508 westbound at Broad Street in downtown Newark

CR 508 begins in Livingston at the Livingston Circle, a realigned traffic circle, with Mt. Pleasant Avenue (Route 10) and Eisenhower Parkway (CR 609). As West Northfield Road, the highway travels through a primarily residential section of Livingston. This turns into a more commercial area approaching the intersection of South Livingston Avenue (CR 649), after which East Northfield Road goes through another residential section. At the eastern end of Livingston there is another commercial area near the intersections of East Cedar Street (CR 527) and Old Short Hills Road. After this the route enters West Orange; the road, now called Northfield Avenue, is lined with businesses and offices until it enters South Mountain Reservation.

After crossing over the Second Watchung Mountain the route intersects with Pleasant Valley Way (CR 636). Beyond the intersection there are businesses on the north side, with the Richard J. Codey Arena and Turtle Back Zoo on the south side. The road then climbs up the First Watchung Mountain, intersects with Prospect Avenue (CR 677) (signed as CR 577 Spur), then heads down towards the foot of the mountain, intersecting with Gregory Avenue (CR 577) about halfway down. At the bottom, CR 508 turns east on Whittingham Place, while Northfield Avenue finishes its run as CR 508 Spur. Eastbound traffic continues down Whittingham Place to Valley Road, whereas westbound traffic uses one-way Kingsley Street as a shortcut between Valley Road and Whittingham Place. CR 508 reunites on Valley Road at the south end of Kingsley Street, and then very soon turns east on Central Avenue, passing through a small industrial area before entering Orange.

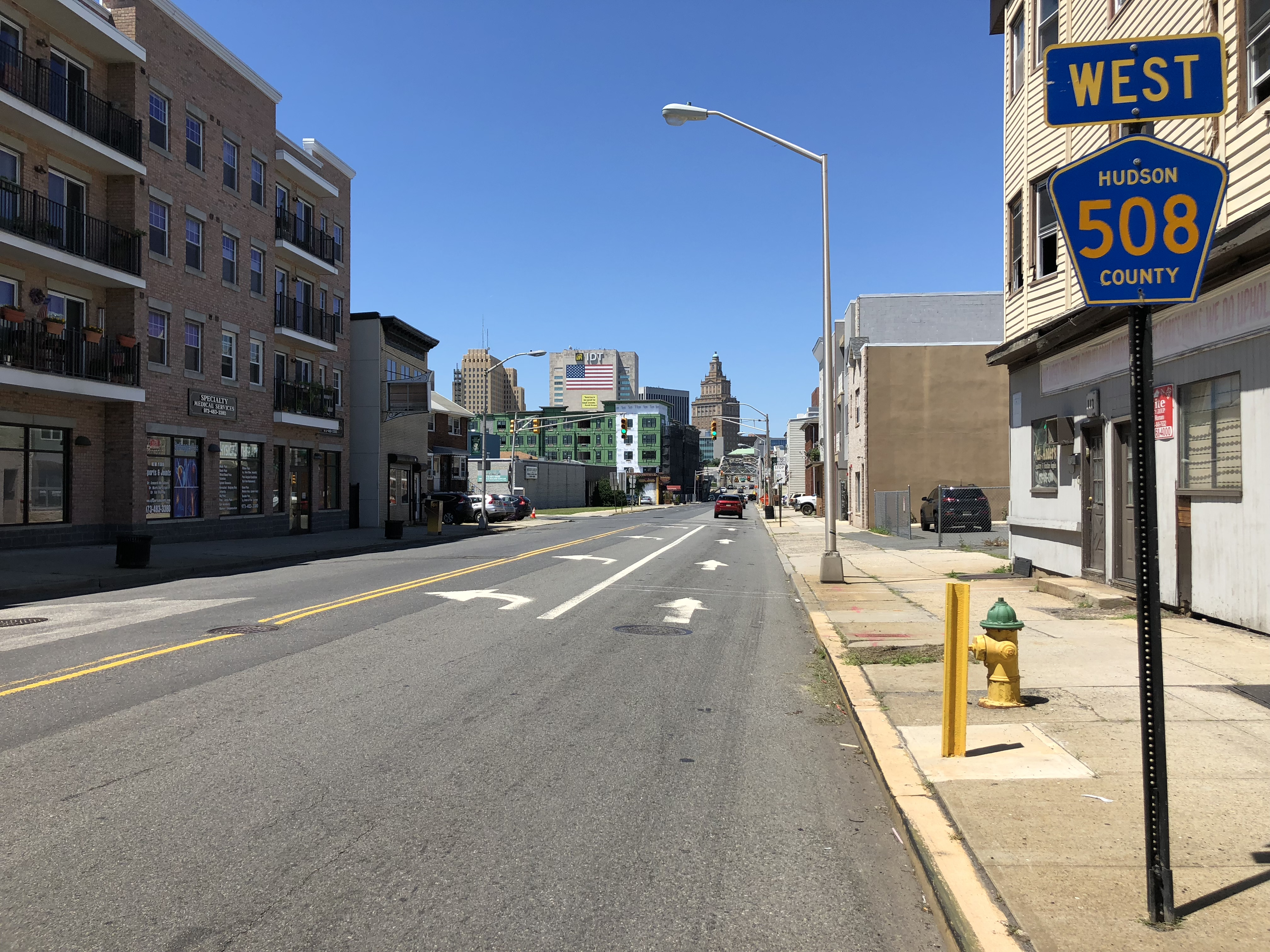
View west along CR 508 (Harrison Avenue) at I-280 in Harrison

The road passes under the Morristown Line and intersects County Route 638 (Scotland Road). A variety of schools, businesses, parks, churches, and houses line Central Avenue through Orange, This becomes mostly businesses as the route passes through East Orange, where it intersects County Route 605 (Evergreen Place) and County Route 509 (Grove Street). The route forms the northern edge of Fairmount Cemetery straddling the boundary between East Orange and Newark. Central Avenue passes through University Heights, which ends at Broad Street. CR 508 continues on Park Place and Center Street, passing the New Jersey Performing Arts Center. An unsigned multiplex with Route 21 (McCarter Highway) between Center and Bridge Streets follows, at which point the route turns east onto the Bridge Street Bridge.

CR 508 crosses the Passaic River into Harrison, Hudson County, on the Bridge Street Bridge, which becomes Harrison Avenue. It intersects County Route 699 (Passaic Avenue), Interstate 280, County Route 697 (Frank E. Rodgers Blvd), and County Route 507 (Schuyler Avenue) in Harrison. The road becomes Newark-Jersey City Turnpike in Kearny and intersects Interstate 280 before ending at a grade-separated interchange with State Route 7, which is Belleville Turnpike west of the interchange but takes on the Newark-Jersey City Turnpike name east of it.

== History ==
A road from the Passaic River to the Hudson Waterfront was completed in 1750 and named Douwe's Ferry Road, for the ferry which crossed the Hackensack River. In 1790 the state legislature decided that "public good would be served by a 64 feet (20 m) wide road from Paulus Hook to Newark Couthouse". By 1795 a bridge over the Hackensack 950 feet (290 m) long and another over the Passaic 492 feet (150 m) long (at the site of the Bridge Street Bridge) were built creating an uninterrupted toll road connection. The road between them was known as the Newark Turnpike. The like-named Newark Plank Road also connected with Hudson Waterfront with Newark following a different route.

In 1916, this road was signed as part of the William Penn Highway, which stretched from New York to Pittsburgh, Pennsylvania. The route was incorporated into Route 9 in 1927, before being entirely removed by 1953. The county route was established largely along its present-day alignment in 1952, along with the other 500-series county highways.

== Major intersections ==
County	Location	mi	km	Destinations	Notes
Essex	Livingston	0.00	0.00	Route 10 / CR 609 (Eisenhower Parkway) – Whippany, The Caldwells, The Oranges, Newark	Livingston Circle; western terminus
Essex	Livingston	2.96	4.76	CR 527 (East Cedar Street)	
Essex	West Orange	5.83	9.38	CR 577 (Gregory Avenue)	
Essex	West Orange	6.22	10.01	CR 508 Spur east (Old Northfield Avenue) to I-280 east	Western terminus of CR 508 Spur
Essex	East Orange	9.23	14.85	CR 509 (Grove Street)	
Essex	Newark	11.53	18.56	Route 21 south	Western end of Route 21 concurrency
Essex	Newark	12.20	19.63	Route 21 north	Eastern end of Route 21 concurrency
Hudson	Harrison	12.54	20.18	I-280	Exit 16 on I-280
Hudson	Harrison	13.38	21.53	CR 507 north (Schuyler Avenue)	Southern terminus of CR 507
Hudson	Kearny	14.26– 14.48	22.95– 23.30	I-280 to I-95 Toll / N.J. Turnpike	Exits 17A-B on I-280
Hudson	Kearny	15.80	25.43	Route 7 west to CR 506 west – Belleville	Interchange; westbound exit and eastbound entrance
Hudson	Kearny	16.14	25.97	Route 7 east to US 1-9 – Jersey City	Eastern terminus
1.000 mi = 1.609 km; 1.000 km = 0.621 mi: Concurrency terminus; Incomplete access

== Spur routes ==
=== CR 508 Spur ===
County Route 508 Spur
- Location: West Orange
- Length: 0.31 mi (500 m)

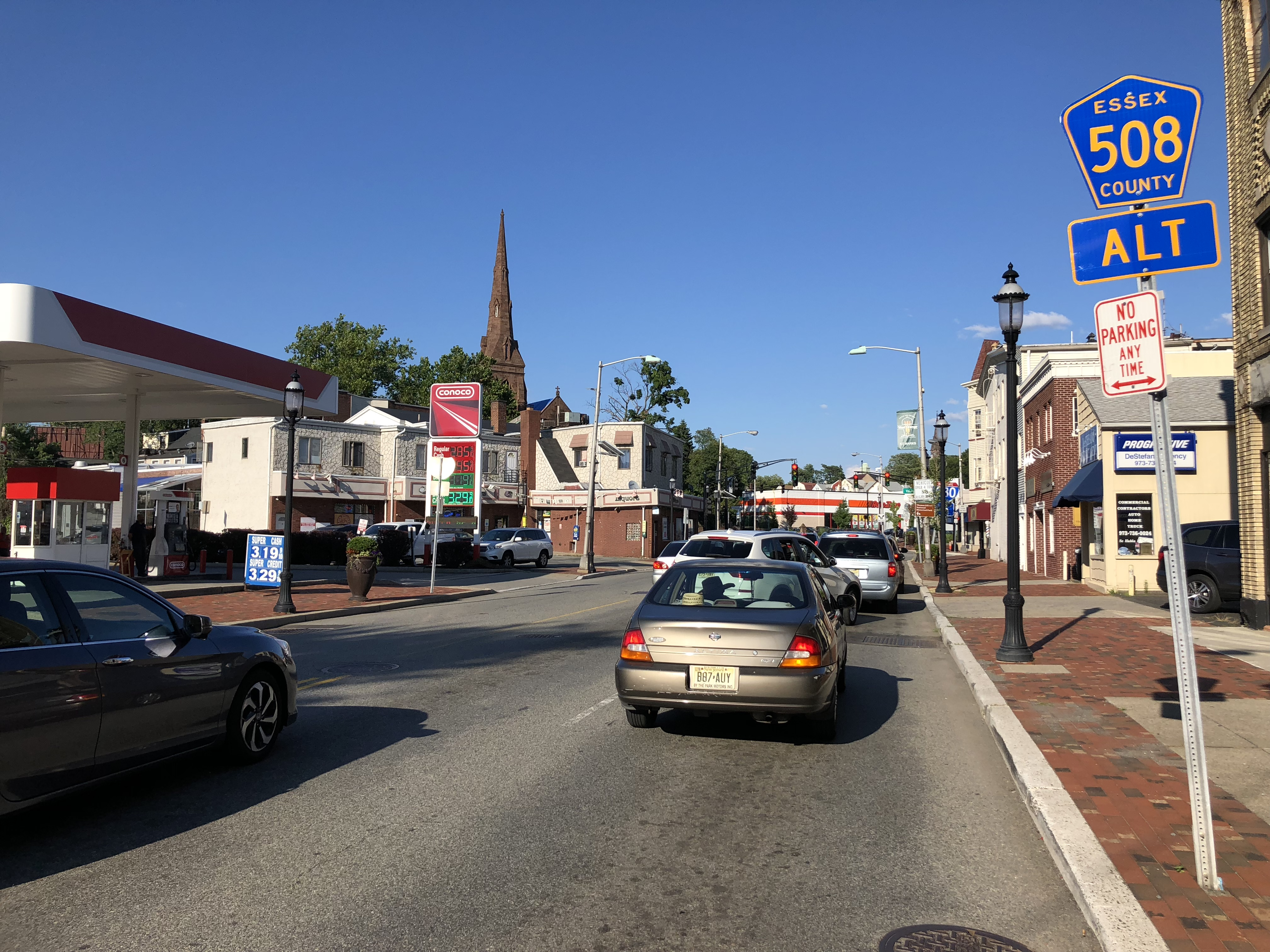
View east along CR 508 Spur, signed as CR 508 Alt, near Main Street in West Orange

County Route 508 Spur (CR 508 Spur) is a 0.31-mile-long (0.50 km) spur route in West Orange. The spur route runs on Northfield Avenue between Whittingham Place and Main Street. Signage is sporadic with one sign using "Alt" instead of "Spur."

Major intersections
The entire route is in West Orange, Essex County.

mi	km	Destinations	Notes
0.00	0.00	CR 508 (Northfield Avenue / Whittington Place)	Western terminus
0.20	0.32	I-280 east to N.J. Turnpike (I-95)	Exit 10 on I-280
0.31	0.50	CR 659 (Main Street)	Eastern terminus
1.000 mi = 1.609 km; 1.000 km = 0.621 mi

=== CR 508 Alternate ===
County Route 508 Alternate (CR 508 Alt.) is a 0.41-mile-long (0.66 km) unsigned former segment of the Newark Turnpike in Kearny. It is a two-lane wide, county-maintained access road from Route 7 eastbound serving a NJ Transit maintenance facility and other industrial companies in the Meadowlands.
