= William Penn Highway =

Auto trail in the United States Mid-Atlantic region

William Penn Highway

Route information
- Existed: 1916–present

Major junctions
- West end: Pittsburgh, Pennsylvania
- East end: New York, New York

Location
- Country: United States
- States: Pennsylvania, New Jersey, New York

Highway system
- Auto trails

The William Penn Highway was an auto trail that ran from Pittsburgh, Pennsylvania in the west to New York, New York in the east. It served as the Pikes Peak Ocean to Ocean Highway west of Reading and as its branch to New York City.

The William Penn Highway Association of Pennsylvania was organized on March 27, 1916 to promote a road parallel to the Pennsylvania Railroad between Pittsburgh and Philadelphia. It was officially dedicated on November 2, 1916.

== Routing ==
=== Pennsylvania ===
The William Penn Highway in Pennsylvania has largely been superseded by U.S. Route 22 (US 22). From Pittsburgh, the highway's original route followed modern-day Pennsylvania Route 380 (PA 380) and PA 8 to Wilkinsburg, then Penn Avenue and the William Penn Highway up to an alignment since absorbed by Interstate 376 (I-376). From here, the road weaves between I-376, still known as the Old William Penn Highway, bypassing the old Northern Pike to the north. From here to Armagh, the highway closely follows modern-day US 22, though this route bypasses town centers historically served by the William Penn.

At Armagh, a loop following the north bank of the Conemaugh River serviced Johnstown, and has since been replaced by PA 403 and William Penn Avenue, connecting back to the main highway at Mundy's Corner.

The highway then went to Ebensburg, where it branched off from both its predecessor and successor thoroughfares by traveling along Manor Drive to Loretto, then Syberton Road to PA 53 to Ashville, and PA 36 to Altoona. From here, the highway paralleled the Pennsylvania Railroad closely, turning north on US 220 Business and Old US 220 to Tyrone, then south to Water Street, where it meets today's course of US 22 again.

From Alexandria to Huntingdon, the old Northern Pike was bypassed by a route to the south, which US 22 has in turn bypassed in part. US 22 again bypasses the original route from Lewistown to Thompsontown. From Millerstown, the route services Liverpool via present-day PA 17 and US 11/15.

Through the highway's early history, it serviced Downtown Harrisburg directly. From the west, it entered the city by Front Street, and may have used Market Street through Downtown Harrisburg. The route crossed over the Pennsylvania Railroad using Mulberry Street using a connection with Fourth Street.

From Harrisburg to Allentown, the original highway serviced the cities of Lebanon and Reading directly. It left Harrisburg on Derry Street, which at the time Grayson Road over the Reading Railroad. After a brief stretch of modern US 322, the road passed through Hummelstown on Main Street, then crossed over the Reading again to follow Chocolate Avenue through Hershey.

Through Lebanon to Reading, the route is still serviced by US 422, with the exception of bypasses of Myerstown and Womesldorf. The route entered Reading on Penn Avenue and left on US 222 Business. With the exception of bypasses of Kutztown and Trexlertown, the route follows US 222 and PA 222 into Allentown. It exited Allentown on Hanover Avenue and entered Bethlehem on Broad Street.

From Bethlehem to the New Jersey border, the highway followed modern-day Linden Street and Easton Avenue in Bethlehem; William Penn Highway between Bethlehem and Easton; and Butler Street, 13th Street, and Northampton Street in Easton.

=== New Jersey ===
The road is today the following routes:

- US 22
- Route 57
- CR 517
- CR 513
- CR 510
- Route 124
- CR 508
- Route 7

West of Newark, the whole alignment was designated as Route 24 in 1927.

== See also ==
- Penn-Lincoln Parkway
