= County Route 577 (New Jersey) =

County highway in New Jersey, U.S.

County Route 577
- CR 577 highlighted in red

Route information
- Length: 13.10 mi (21.08 km)

Major junctions
- South end: CR 509 in Westfield
- US 22 in Springfield Township; Route 82 / Route 124 in Springfield Township; CR 527 in Millburn; CR 510 in South Orange; CR 508 in West Orange; Route 10 in West Orange; I-280 in West Orange
- North end: Route 23 / CR 506 in Verona

Location
- Country: United States
- State: New Jersey
- Counties: Union, Essex

Highway system
- County routes in New Jersey; 500-series routes
← CR 575	→ CR 579

County Route 577 (CR 577) is a county highway in the U.S. state of New Jersey. The highway extends 13.1 miles (21.1 km) from CR 509 in Westfield to Route 23 and Bloomfield Avenue (CR 506) in Verona.

== Route description ==
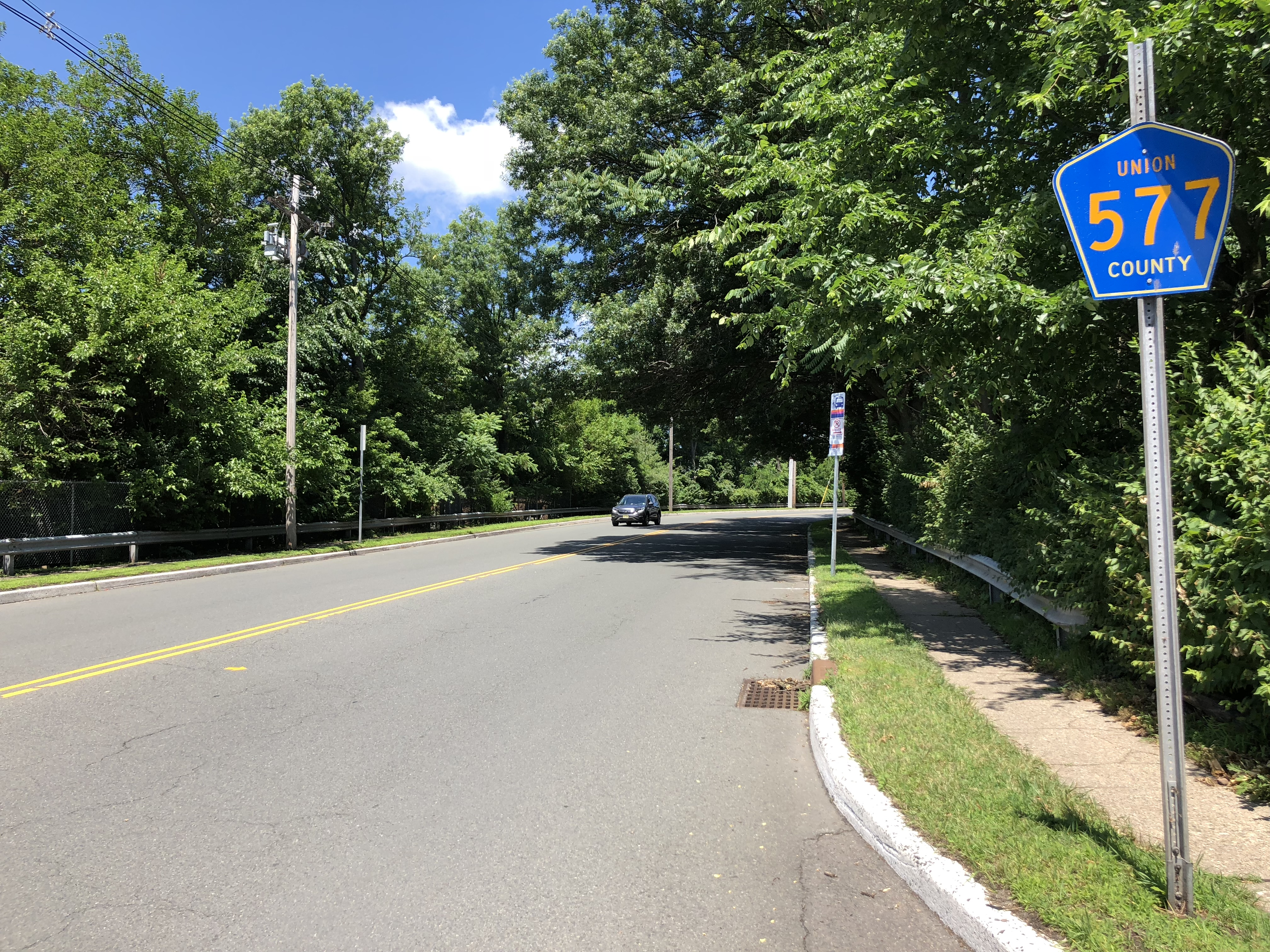
View of CR 577 near Route 124 in Springfield

CR 577 begins at the intersection of Springfield Avenue and East Broad Street (both part of CR 509) in the northern reaches of Westfield. The county road first heads northwest on Springfield Avenue but then curves to the north-northeast. After passing mostly residential neighborhoods, it passes the entrance to the Echo Lake Country Club. The road crosses the Nomahegan Brook and crosses partially into Mountainside then fully into Springfield Township where it passes businesses and apartment complexes. After an interchange with U.S. Route 22 (US 22), CR 577 proceeds further into Springfield Township passing houses, schools, and small businesses. The road name changes to Meisel Avenue and then approaches a complex intersection with Route 82 (its western terminus) and Route 124, both of which carry Morris Avenue. CR 577 has a brief concurrency with Route 124 through the traffic circle-like intersection where Maple Avenue carries the nominal route northbound while Meisel Avenue carries the southbound traffic. From this intersection, the route heads north as two-lane undivided Main Street. After crossing over Interstate 78 (I-78), the road enters Millburn, Essex County where the road becomes municipally maintained. The road runs through suburban residential developments. In Millburn, CR 577 reaches a junction with CR 527, at which point the route turns east onto a one-way pair that is county maintained. Northbound CR 577 follows three-lane Millburn Avenue and southbound CR 577 follows two-lane Essex Avenue on this pairing, which passes through the commercial downtown of Millburn. At the end of the one-way pair, the route becomes four-lane undivided Millburn Avenue and continues east through a mix of homes and businesses. At the Wyoming Avenue intersection, CR 577 turns northeast onto that road while CR 630 continues along Millburn Avenue.

Wyoming Avenue, which is a two-lane road, carries the route over New Jersey Transit’s Morristown Line and into wooded residential neighborhoods a short distance to the east of the South Mountain Reservation. The road continues through Maplewood before crossing into South Orange, where it reaches CR 510. At this point, CR 577 turns east to form a brief concurrency with CR 510, which is four-lane South Orange Avenue. Upon splitting from that route, CR 577 continues northeast on two-lane Wyoming Avenue. The road enters West Orange and becomes Gregory Avenue. Here, the route crosses CR 508 prior to reaching the CR 660 junction.

At CR 660, CR 577 turns north onto Mt. Pleasant Avenue and crosses First Watchung Mountain as the road makes a turn to the west. This road is four lanes at first, soon narrowing to two lanes. After crossing the mountain, the route intersects Prospect Avenue, which it turns north onto. At this intersection, Prospect Avenue heads south as CR 677 while Mt. Pleasant Avenue continues west as Route 10. Along Prospect Avenue, CR 577 is a two-lane undivided road that turns into a four-lane divided highway as it passes through commercial areas. The route comes to an interchange with I-280 and becomes a five-lane undivided road past that point, with three northbound lanes and two southbound lanes. At the CR 611 intersection, CR 577 becomes three lanes with two lanes southbound and one lane northbound The road runs between homes and the Montclair Golf Course to the west and the Eagle Rock Reservation to the east before becoming two lanes and crossing into Verona. In Verona, CR 577 passes residences before reaching its end at an intersection with CR 506. Past this intersection, the road continues north as Route 23.

== History ==
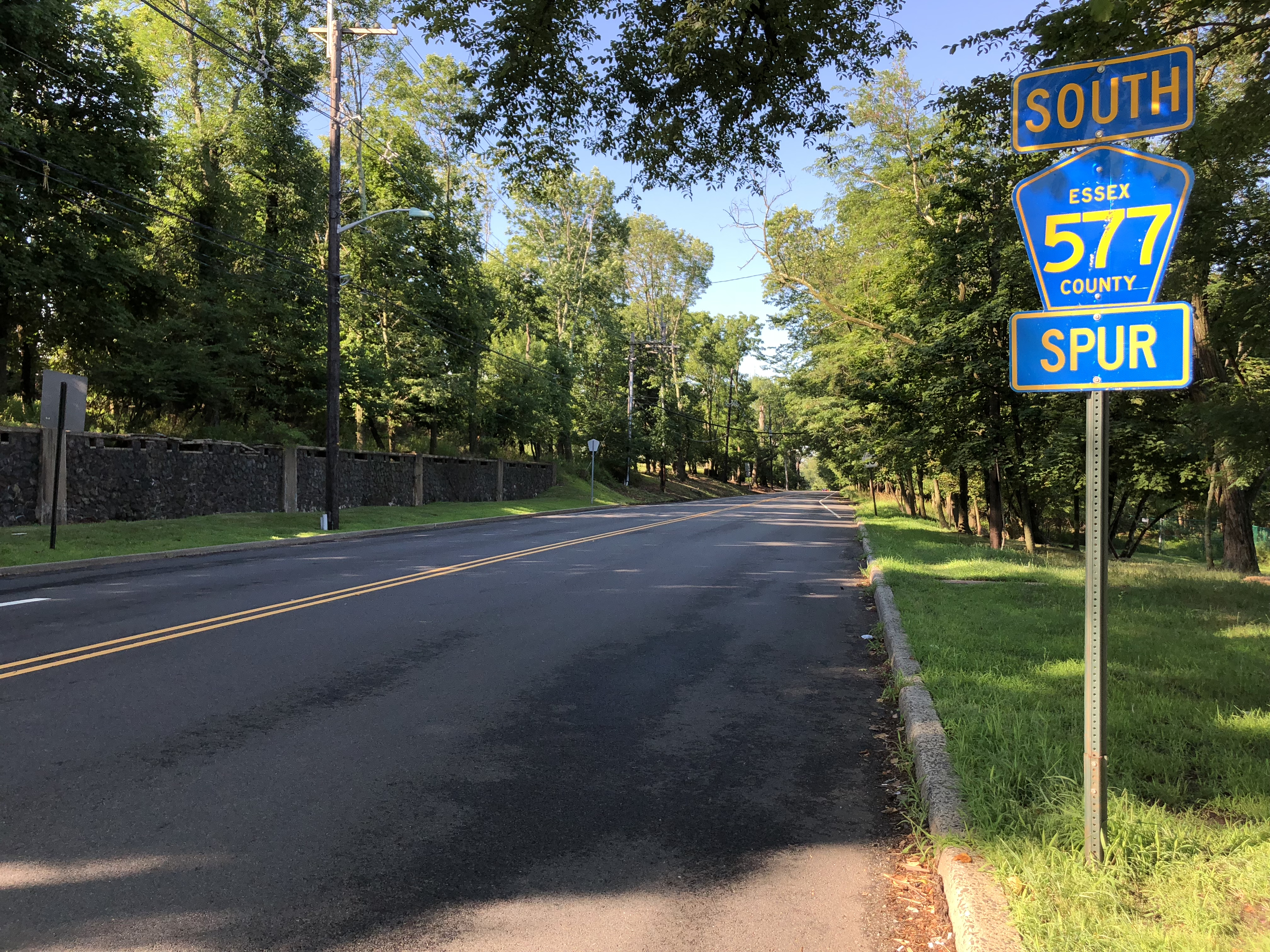
CR 577 Spur signed at the junction of CR 577 and Route 10 in West Orange

A spur route, County Route 577 Spur, existed, which is now Essex County Route 677, however some newer signage along the road has brought back the CR 577 Spur designation.

The portion of CR 577 south of Route 124 was previously part of CR 509 Spur. Though the CR 509 Spur designation was officially designated on this section by the state until 2019, CR 577 signage appeared on this section of road prior to then.

== Major intersections ==
County	Location	mi	km	Destinations	Notes
Union	Westfield	0.00	0.00	CR 509 (Springfield Avenue / East Broad Street) to G.S. Parkway / CR 605 (Nomahegan Drive) – Kenilworth, Westfield	Southern terminus
Union	Springfield Township	0.93	1.50	US 22 – Newark, Somerville	Interchange
Union	Springfield Township	2.98– 3.14	4.80– 5.05	Route 82 east (Morris Avenue) / Route 124 (Springfield Avenue) to I-78 west / G.S. Parkway / Route 24 west – Union, Morristown	Western terminus of Route 82; Route 124 and CR 577 share a concurrency through the intersection
Essex	Millburn	4.06– 4.08	6.53– 6.57	CR 527 (Millburn Avenue / Essex Street / Old Short Hills Road)	Northbound concurrency
Essex	South Orange	6.67	10.73	CR 510 west (Orange Avenue)	Southern end of CR 510 concurrency
Essex	South Orange	6.78	10.91	CR 510 east (South Orange Avenue)	Northern end of CR 510 concurrency
Essex	West Orange	9.07	14.60	CR 508 (Northfield Avenue)	
Essex	West Orange	10.11	16.27	Route 10 west (Mt. Pleasant Avenue) / CR 677 south (Prospect Avenue) – Whippany, Millburn, Zoo, Arena	Eastern terminus of Route 10; CR 677 signed as CR 577 Spur
Essex	West Orange	10.69– 10.92	17.20– 17.57	I-280 to G.S. Parkway / N.J. Turnpike (I-95) – Newark	Exit 8 on I-280
Essex	Verona	13.10	21.08	Route 23 north / CR 506 (Bloomfield Avenue) – Little Falls, Caldwell, Newark	Northern terminus; southern terminus of Route 23
1.000 mi = 1.609 km; 1.000 km = 0.621 mi: Concurrency terminus
