= List of highways numbered 626 =

The following highways are numbered 626:

== United States ==
- PR-626
- SR 626

| Preceded by 625 | Lists of highways 626 | Succeeded by 627 |
