= List of county routes in Morris County, New Jersey =

The following is a list of county routes in Morris County in the U.S. state of New Jersey.

== 500-series county routes ==
In addition to those listed below, the following 500-series county routes serve Morris County:

- CR 504, CR 510, CR 511, CR 511 Alt, CR 512, CR 513, CR 517, CR 525, CR 531

== Other county routes ==
Route	Length (mi)	Length (km)	From	Via	To	Notes
CR 601	3.77	6.07	Village Road (CR 646) in Harding Township	Spring Valley Road, South Street	South Street (Route 124) and Madison Avenue (Route 124) in Morristown	
CR 602	0.51	0.82	Lakeside Boulevard (CR 631) and Center Street (CR 631) in Roxbury	Lakeside Boulevard	Lakeside Boulevard (CR 607) at the Sussex County line in Roxbury	
CR 603	3.77	6.07	East Main Street (Route 53), West Main Street, and Broadway in Denville	Diamond Spring Road, River Road, Bush Road, Boonton Road, Old Denville Road	Powerville Road (CR 618) in Boonton Township	
CR 604	4.02	6.47	Meyersville Road (CR 638) in Long Hill	New Vernon Road, Long Hill Road	Lees Hill Road (CR 663) in Harding Township	
CR 605	1.00	1.61	Valley Road (CR 512) in Long Hill	Division Avenue, Long Hill Road	Basking Ridge Road (CR 657) and Long Hill Road (CR 657) in Long Hill	
CR 606	0.22	0.35	Stirling Road (CR 653) at the Somerset County line in Long Hill	Plainfield Road	Valley Road (CR 512) in Long Hill	
CR 607	1.63	2.62	Main Street (Route 124) in Chatham	North Passaic Avenue, Passaic Avenue	Passaic Avenue (CR 607) at the Essex County line in Florham Park	
CR 608	2.60	4.18	Main Street (Route 124) in Madison	Central Avenue, Ridgedale Avenue	Columbia Turnpike (CR 510) and Ridgedale Avenue (CR 632) in Florham Park	
CR 609	1.55	2.49	Columbia Turnpike (CR 510) in Florham Park	Hanover Road	Mount Pleasant Avenue (CR 610) in East Hanover	
CR 610	1.02	1.64	Route 10 in East Hanover	Mount Pleasant Avenue	Mount Pleasant Avenue (CR 610) at the Essex County line in East Hanover	
CR 611	0.68	1.09	Ridgedale Avenue (CR 632) in East Hanover	Eagle Rock Avenue	Eagle Rock Avenue (CR 611) at the Essex County line in East Hanover	
CR 612	1.08	1.74	Bartley Road (CR 625) and Bartley–Chester Road (CR 625) in Mount Olive	Bartley–Chester Road, Flanders–Bartley Road	US 206 in Mount Olive	
CR 613	3.61	5.81	Flanders–Bartley Road (CR 612) in Mount Olive	Flanders–Bartley Road, Main Street, Flanders–Netcong Road, Drakesdale Road	US 206 in Mount Olive	
CR 614	2.53	4.07	Mendham Road (CR 510) and Hilltop Road (CR 525) in Mendham	Mountain Avenue, Calais Road	Dead end in Mendham Township	
CR 615	7.49	12.05	US 46 in Roxbury	Howard Boulevard, Espanong Road, Edison Road	Route 15 in Jefferson Township	
CR 616	2.61	4.20	Landing Road (CR 631) and Lakeside Boulevard (CR 631) in Roxbury	Mount Arlington Boulevard, Windermere Avenue, Altenbrand Avenue	Howard Boulevard (CR 615) in Mount Arlington	
CR 617	9.39	15.11	Route 10 in Randolph	Sussex Turnpike	Speedwell Avenue (US 202) in Morristown	
CR 618	12.03	19.36	US 46 in Mountain Lakes	Boulevard, Elcock Avenue, Powerville Road, Kinnelon Road, Kiel Avenue	Boonton Avenue (CR 511), Park Place (CR 511), and High Street (CR 511) in Butler	
CR 619	3.76	6.05	Main Street (CR 613) in Mount Olive	North Road, Hillside Avenue	Main Street in Roxbury	
CR 620	0.50	0.80	US 46 in Roxbury	Mount Arlington Road	Howard Boulevard (CR 615) in Roxbury	
CR 621	4.65	7.48	US 46 in Montville	Change Bridge Road	Main Road (US 202) in Montville	
CR 622	0.26	0.42	Whippany Road (CR 511) and Parsippany Road (CR 511) in Hanover Township	Whippany Road	Route 10 in Hanover Township	
CR 622 Alt.	0.12	0.19	Parsippany Road (CR 511) in Hanover Township	Mount Pleasant Avenue	Route 10 in Hanover Township	
CR 623	3.62	5.83	Main Street (Route 124) and Madison Avenue (Route 124) in Madison	Park Avenue	Whippany Road (CR 511) on the Hanover/Morris township line	
CR 624	0.80	1.29	Elcock Avenue (CR 618) in Boonton	West Main Street, Main Street	Main Street (CR 511) and Boonton Avenue (CR 511) in Boonton	
CR 624 Alt.	0.11	0.18	Powerville Road (CR 618) and Elcock Avenue (CR 618) on the Boonton/Boonton Township border	Hawkins Place	West Main Street (CR 624) in Boonton	
CR 625	4.22	6.79	CR 513 in Washington Township	Bartley Road, Bartley–Chester Road	US 206 in Mount Olive	
CR 628	0.62	1.00	Loantaka Way (CR 636) in Chatham Township	Shunpike Road	Shunpike Road (CR 646) and Green Village Road (CR 646) in Chatham Township	
CR 630	0.51	0.82	Littleton Road (US 202), Parsippany Road (CR 511), and Parsippany Boulevard (US 202/CR 511) in Parsippany	Littleton Road	Smith Road in Parsippany	
CR 631	4.02	6.47	Ledgewood Avenue (Route 183) in Netcong	Allen Street, Center Street, Lakeside Boulevard, Landing Road	US 46 in Roxbury	
CR 632	6.23	10.03	Columbia Turnpike (CR 510) and Ridgedale Avenue (CR 608) in Florham Park	Ridgedale Avenue	I-280 and New Road in Parsippany	
CR 633	0.19	0.31	Main Street (US 202) and Boonton Turnpike (US 202) in Lincoln Park	Main Street, Comly Road	Comly Road (CR 511 Alt.) in Lincoln Park	
CR 633 Alt.	0.10	0.16	Boonton Turnpike (US 202) in Lincoln Park	Chapel Hill Road	Main Street (CR 633) in Lincoln Park	
CR 634	2.11	3.40	US 46 on the Mine Hill/Wharton border	South Main Street, North Main Street	Route 15 in Wharton	
CR 634 Alt.	0.21	0.34	North Main Street (CR 634) in Wharton	Chegwidden Way	East Dewey Ave (CR 642) in Wharton	
CR 635	0.57	0.92	Boulevard (CR 511 Alt.) in Pequannock	Lincoln Park Road	Newark–Pompton Turnpike (CR 504) in Pequannock	
CR 636	1.78	2.86	Spring Valley Road (CR 601) on the Chatham/Harding township line	Loantaka Way	Madison Avenue (Route 124) in Madison	
CR 637	3.62	5.83	Route 10 in Hanover Township	Troy Hills Road, South Beverwyck Road	US 46 in Parsippany	
CR 638	8.04	12.94	Valley Road (CR 512) and Mountain Avenue (CR 531) in Long Hill	Mountain Avenue, Meyersville Road, Fairmount Avenue	Main Street (Route 124) in Chatham	
CR 640	0.91	1.46	Randolph Avenue (CR 662) in Mine Hill	Randolph Avenue	US 46 in Mine Hill	
CR 642	5.00	8.05	Main Street in Roxbury	Kenvil Avenue, Berkshire Valley Road, West Dewey Avenue, East Dewey Avenue	Route 15 in Wharton	
CR 643	1.39	2.24	Route 10 in Randolph	South Morris Street, North Morris Street	US 46 in Dover	
CR 644	0.96	1.54	West Main Street (CR 513) and Wall Street (CR 513) in Rockaway	East Main Street	US 46 in Rockaway	
CR 646	12.88	20.73	East Main Street (CR 510) in Mendham	Tempe Wick Road, Glen Alpin Road, Village Road, Green Village Road, Shunpike Road, Watchung Avenue	Passaic Avenue (CR 649) and River Road (CR 649) at the Union County line in Chatham	
CR 647	4.39	7.07	Passaic Street (CR 647) at the Union County line in Chatham Township	River Road, Southern Boulevard, Green Village Road	Main Street (Route 124) in Madison	
CR 648	0.15	0.24	Dead end in Morristown	Court Street	Washington Street (CR 510) in Morristown	unsigned
CR 649	1.41	2.27	US 46 in Mount Olive	Sand Shore Road, Netcong Road	US 46 in Mount Olive	
CR 650	7.46	12.01	Sussex Turnpike (CR 617) in Randolph	West Hanover Avenue, East Hanover Avenue	Whippany Road (CR 511) on the Hanover/Morris township line	
CR 651	0.50	0.80	Newark–Pompton Turnpike (CR 511 Alt.) in Riverdale	Riverdale Road	Riverdale Road at the Passaic County line in Riverdale	
CR 652	0.26	0.42	Main Street (CR 613) in Mount Olive	Park Place	North Road (CR 619) in Mount Olive	
CR 654	0.66	1.06	US 202 and I-80 in Parsippany	Cherry Hill Road	US 46 in Parsippany	
CR 655	0.37	0.60	Main Road (US 202) in Montville	Whitehall Road	Main Road (US 202) in Montville	
CR 655 Alt.	1.03	1.66	Main Road (US 202) in Montville	Main Street, Bellows Lane	Dead end in Montville	
CR 656	0.86	1.38	Route 10 in Randolph	Millbrook Avenue	South Morris Street (CR 643) in Dover	
CR 657	2.64	4.25	South Maple Avenue (CR 657) at the Somerset County line in Long Hill	Basking Ridge Road, Long Hill Road	Mountain Avenue (CR 638) and Meyersville Road (CR 638) in Long Hill	
CR 659	0.46	0.74	US 46 in Dover	West Blackwell Street	Prospect Street (CR 513) and West Blackwell Street (CR 513) in Dover	
CR 660	1.80	2.90	Newark–Pompton Turnpike (CR 504) and Jacksonville Road (CR 504) in Pequannock	Newark–Pompton Turnpike	Route 23 in Pequannock	
CR 661	2.83	4.55	US 46 in Dover	Mount Hope Avenue	Mount Hope Road (CR 664) in Rockaway Township	
CR 662	1.14	1.83	Canfield Avenue (CR 669) in Mine Hill	Randolph Avenue	Dover-Chester Road (CR 513) and Quaker Church Road (CR 513) in Randolph	
CR 663	6.58	10.59	Madisonville Road at the Somerset County line in Harding Township	Lees Hill Road, Blue Hill Road, James Street	South Street (Route 124) in Morristown	
CR 664	5.59	9.00	Church Street (CR 513) in Rockaway	Wall Street, Academy Street, Mount Hope Road, Lake Denmark Road	Snake Hill Road in Rockaway Township	
CR 665	1.10	1.77	Route 10 in Randolph	South Salem Street	Blackwell Street (CR 513) in Dover	Formerly CR 666, renumbered due to sign theft.
CR 667	2.03	3.27	US 46 in Mount Olive	Mount Olive Road, Flanders Road	Flanders-Netcong Road (CR 613) in Mount Olive	
CR 668	0.19	0.31	East Hanover Avenue (CR 650) on the Hanover/Morris township line	Highview Avenue	Dead end in Hanover Township	unsigned
CR 669	1.90	3.06	Route 10 in Randolph	Canfield Avenue	US 46 in Mine Hill	
CR 670	3.90	6.28	Sussex Turnpike (CR 617) in Randolph	Millbrook Avenue, Schoolhouse Road, Center Grove Road, Van Nostrand Avenue	Reservoir Avenue (CR 513) and Prospect Street (CR 513) in Dover	
CR 671	0.15	0.24	Ridgedale Avenue in Morris Township	John Street	Dead end in Morris Township	number assigned c. 2018
CR 680	0.74	1.19	Newark–Pompton Turnpike (CR 660) in Pequannock	Jackson Avenue	Pompton Plains Cross Road (CR 680) at the Passaic County line in Pequannock	
CR 694	0.95	1.53	Main Street (CR 694) at the Passaic County line in Riverdale	Paterson–Hamburg Turnpike	Newark–Pompton Turnpike (CR 511 Alt.) and Paterson–Hamburg Turnpike (CR 511 Alt.) in Riverdale	
CR 699	9.26	14.90	Route 15 in Jefferson Township	Berkshire Valley Road	Oak Ridge Road (CR 699) at the Passaic County line in Jefferson Township	
