= List of county routes in Essex County, New Jersey =

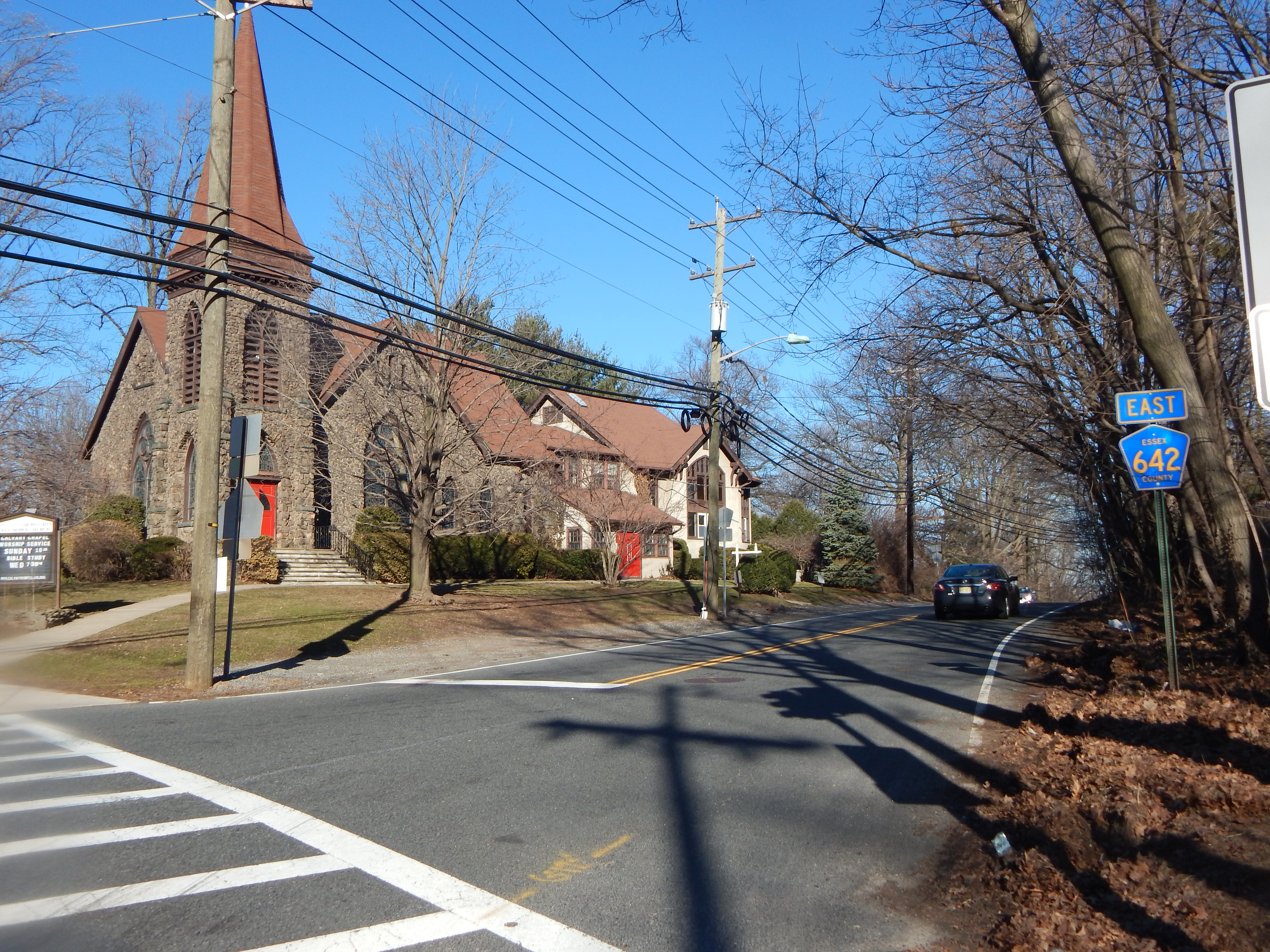
Example of signage in Essex County, with CR 642 (Mount Hebron Road) in Montclair

The following is a list of county routes in Essex County in the U.S. state of New Jersey. For more information on the county route system in New Jersey as a whole, including its history, see County routes in New Jersey.

== 500-series county routes ==
In addition to those listed below, the following 500-series county routes serve Essex County:

- CR 506, CR 506 Spur, CR 508, CR 508 Spur, CR 509, CR 510, CR 527, CR 577

== Other county routes ==
Route	Length (mi)	Length (km)	From	Via	To	Notes
CR 601	2.66	4.28	Springfield Avenue (Route 124) in Maplewood	Chancellor Avenue	Elizabeth Avenue in Newark	
CR 602	2.23	3.59	Springfield Avenue (CR 603) in Irvington	Lyons Avenue	Elizabeth Avenue in Newark	
CR 603	3.72	5.99	Springfield Avenue (Route 124) on the Maplewood/Irvington township line	Springfield Avenue	South Orange Avenue (CR 510) in Newark	
CR 604	1.51	2.43	Lindsley Road (CR 604) at the Passaic County line in North Caldwell	Lindsley Road, East Lindsley Road	Francisco Avenue (CR 612) at the Passaic County line in Cedar Grove	
CR 605	2.74	4.41	Springfield Avenue (CR 603) in Irvington	Sanford Avenue, Sanford Street	Central Avenue (CR 508) in East Orange	
CR 606	2.81	4.52	Old Short Hills Road (CR 527) in Millburn	Parsonage Hill Road	Passaic Avenue (CR 607) in Livingston	
CR 607	3.16	5.09	North Passaic Avenue (CR 607) at the Morris County line in Millburn	Passaic Avenue, Walnut Street	Mount Pleasant Avenue (Route 10) in Livingston	
CR 608	5.36	8.63	Route 124 in Millburn	Hobart Gap Road, White Oak Ridge Road, East Hobart Gap Road, West Hobart Gap Road	Walnut Street (CR 607) in Livingston	
CR 609	4.12	6.63	South Orange Avenue (CR 510) in Livingston	Eisenhower Parkway	I-280 in Roseland	
CR 610	0.25	0.40	Old Mount Pleasant Avenue (CR 610) at the Morris County line in Livingston	Old Mount Pleasant Avenue	Mount Pleasant Avenue (Route 10) in Livingston	
CR 611	6.63	10.67	Eagle Rock Avenue (CR 611) at the Morris County line in Roseland	Eagle Rock Avenue	Harrison Avenue (CR 656) in West Orange	
CR 613	6.29	10.12	Eagle Rock Avenue (CR 611) in Roseland	Passaic Avenue, Two Bridges Road	Two Bridges Road at the Morris County line in Fairfield	
CR 613 Spur	0.38	0.61	Passaic Avenue (CR 613) in West Caldwell	Kirkpatrick Lane	Clinton Road (CR 614) in West Caldwell	
CR 614	1.42	2.29	Clinton Road (Route 159) and Oak Road (Route 159) in Fairfield	Clinton Road	Fairfield Avenue in West Caldwell	
CR 614 Spur	0.17	0.27	Oak Road (Route 159) in Fairfield	Brook Street	Clinton Road (CR 614) in Fairfield	
CR 615	3.51	5.65	US 46 in Fairfield	Fairfield Road, Little Falls Road	Grandview Avenue (CR 631) on the North Caldwell/Little Falls border	
CR 616	0.53	0.85	Pompton Avenue (Route 23) in Cedar Grove	Stevens Avenue	Stevens Avenue (CR 616) at the Passaic County line in Cedar Grove	
CR 617	1.22	1.96	Pompton Avenue (Route 23) in Cedar Grove	Little Falls Road	Cedar Grove Road (CR 617) at the Passaic County line in Cedar Grove	
CR 618	1.29	2.08	Ridge Road (CR 641) in Cedar Grove	Reservoir Drive, Normal Avenue	Valley Road (CR 621) in Montclair	
CR 619	2.89	4.65	Stuyvesant Avenue (CR 619) at the Union County line in Irvington	Stuyvesant Avenue	South Orange Avenue (CR 510) in Newark	
CR 620	1.02	1.64	South of Mountain Terrace in Montclair	Upper Mountain Avenue	Clove Road (CR 631) at the Passaic County line in Montclair	
CR 621	3.23	5.20	Bloomfield Avenue (CR 506) in Montclair	Valley Road	Normal Avenue (CR 618) and Valley Road (CR 621) at the Passaic County line in Montclair	
CR 622	1.01	1.63	Broad Street (CR 509) in Bloomfield	West Passaic Avenue, Darling Avenue	Bloomfield Avenue (CR 622) at the Passaic County line on the Bloomfield/Nutley township line	
CR 623	3.31	5.33	Bloomfield Avenue (CR 506) and Elm Street (CR 668) in Montclair	Grove Street	Grove Street (CR 623) at the Passaic County line in Montclair	
CR 624	1.24	2.00	Belleville/Nutley township line	River Road	River Road (CR 624) at the Passaic County line in Nutley	
CR 625	2.12	3.41	Horseneck Road (CR 626) in Fairfield	Hollywood Avenue	Fairfield Road (CR 615) in Fairfield	
CR 626	2.53	4.07	Horseneck Road at the Morris County line in Fairfield	Horseneck Road	Fairfield Road (CR 615) in Fairfield	
CR 627	0.54	0.87	US 46 in Fairfield	Plymouth Street	Horseneck Road (CR 626) in Fairfield	
CR 628	0.75	1.21	Passaic Avenue (CR 613) in Fairfield	West Greenbrook Road	Grandview Avenue (CR 631) and Central Avenue (CR 631) in North Caldwell	
CR 629	0.59	0.95	Passaic Avenue (CR 613) in Fairfield	Pier Lane	Little Falls Road (CR 615) in Fairfield	
CR 630	1.17	1.88	Millburn Avenue (CR 577) and Wyoming Avenue (CR 577) in Millburn	Millburn Avenue	Springfield Avenue (Route 124) in Maplewood	
CR 630 Alt.	0.04	0.06	Millburn Avenue (CR 630) in Millburn	Vauxhall Road	Vauxhall Road (CR 630) at the Union County line in Millburn	
CR 631	3.42	5.50	Bloomfield Avenue (CR 506) in Caldwell	Central Avenue, Grandview Avenue	Little Falls Road (CR 615) and Main Street (CR 631) at the Passaic County line in North Caldwell	
CR 632	1.46	2.35	Passaic Avenue (CR 613) in West Caldwell	Westville Avenue	Roseland Avenue (CR 527) in Caldwell	
CR 633	1.69	2.72	Roseland Avenue (CR 527) in Essex Fells	Runnymede Road, Lane Avenue	Bloomfield Avenue (CR 506) on the Caldwell/West Caldwell border	
CR 634	1.82	2.93	Mt Pleasant Avenue (Route 10) in Livingston	Laurel Avenue	Eagle Rock Avenue (CR 611) in West Orange	
CR 635	1.59	2.56	East Cedar Street (CR 527) in Livingston	Shrewsbury Drive	Laurel Avenue (CR 634) in Livingston	
CR 636	4.88	7.85	Northfield Avenue (CR 508) in West Orange	Pleasant Valley Way, Lakeside Avenue	Bloomfield Avenue (CR 506) in Verona	
CR 637	2.34	3.77	Bloomfield Avenue (CR 506) in Verona	Fairview Avenue	Pompton Avenue (Route 23) in Cedar Grove	
CR 638	5.38	8.66	Valley Street (CR 638) at the Union County line in Maplewood	Valley Street, Scotland Road, High Street	Washington Street (CR 671) in Orange	
CR 638 Spur	0.05	0.08	Valley Street (CR 638) in South Orange	Village Plaza	South Orange Avenue (CR 510) in South Orange	
CR 639	1.86	2.99	Bloomfield Avenue (CR 506) in Verona	Grove Avenue	Pompton Avenue (Route 23) in Cedar Grove	
CR 640	1.46	2.35	Grove Avenue (CR 639) in Cedar Grove	West Bradford Avenue, East Bradford Avenue, Bradford Avenue	Upper Mountain Avenue in Montclair	
CR 641	2.04	3.28	Pompton Avenue (Route 23) in Cedar Grove	Ridge Road	Ridge Road (CR 641) at the Passaic County line in Cedar Grove	
CR 642	0.37	0.60	Valley Road (CR 621) in Montclair	Mount Hebron Road	Grove Street (CR 623) in Montclair	
CR 643	0.67	1.08	Grove Street (CR 623) in Montclair	Alexander Avenue	Broad Street (CR 509) in Bloomfield	
CR 644	0.80	1.29	West Passaic Avenue (CR 622) and Darling Avenue (CR 622) on the Bloomfield/Nutley township line	Kingsland Street	Kingsland Street (Route 7) and Passaic Avenue (Route 7) in Nutley	
CR 644 Spur	0.04	0.06	Kingsland Street (CR 644) in Nutley	Cathedral Avenue	Cathedral Avenue (Route 7) in Nutley	
CR 645	3.84	6.18	Franklin Street (CR 670) in Newark	Franklin Avenue	Kingsland Street (Route 7) in Nutley	
CR 646	0.28	0.45	Washington Avenue (Route 7) in Nutley	Park Avenue	River Road (CR 624) in Nutley	
CR 647	1.92	3.09	Mill Street (CR 672) in Belleville	Union Avenue	Centre Street (CR 648) in Nutley	
CR 648	1.80	2.90	East Passaic Avenue (CR 652) on the Bloomfield/Nutley township line	Centre Street	Washington Avenue (Route 7) in Nutley	
CR 649	5.30	8.53	Route 24 and JFK Parkway (CR 649) at the Union County line in Millburn	JFK Parkway, South Livingston Avenue	South Livingston Avenue (CR 527) and East Cedar Street (CR 527) in Livingston	
CR 650	1.10	1.77	West Passaic Avenue (CR 622) in Bloomfield	High Street	Franklin Avenue (CR 645) in Nutley	
CR 651	0.62	1.00	JFK Drive (CR 652) in Bloomfield	Hoover Avenue	Joralemon Street in Bloomfield	
CR 651 Spur	0.10	0.16	Hoover Avenue (CR 651) in Bloomfield	East Passaic Avenue	East Passaic Avenue (CR 652) in Bloomfield	
CR 652	2.81	4.52	Belleville Avenue (CR 506 in Bloomfield	JFK Drive, East Passaic Avenue	West Passaic Avenue (CR 622) in Bloomfield	
CR 653	3.20	5.15	Orange Road (CR 669) and Thomas Boulevard in Glen Ridge	Ridgewood Avenue	Watchung Avenue (CR 655) in Glen Ridge	
CR 654	0.54	0.87	Highland Avenue in Glen Ridge	Bay Avenue	Broad Street (CR 509) in Glen Ridge	
CR 655	2.30	3.70	Upper Mountain Avenue in Montclair	Watchung Avenue	East Passaic Avenue (CR 652) in Bloomfield	
CR 656	1.31	2.11	Passaic Avenue (CR 613) on the Roseland/West Caldwell border	Harrison Avenue	Eagle Rock Avenue (CR 611) in Roseland	
CR 658	3.88	6.24	Main Street (CR 659) in West Orange	Park Avenue	Bloomfield Avenue (CR 506 Spur) in Newark	
CR 659	1.67	2.69	Scotland Road (CR 638) and High Street (CR 638) in Orange	Main Street	Eagle Rock Avenue (CR 611) in West Orange	
CR 660	0.66	1.06	Mount Pleasant Avenue (CR 577) and Gregory Avenue (CR 577) in West Orange	Mount Pleasant Avenue	Main Street (CR 659) in West Orange	
CR 661	1.24	2.00	Eisenhower Parkway (CR 609) in Livingston	Beaufort Avenue	Eisenhower Parkway (CR 609) in Livingston	
CR 661 Spur	0.11	0.18	Beaufort Avenue (CR 661) in Livingston	Old Beaufort Avenue	Dead end in Livingston	
CR 662	0.73	1.17	Fairfield Road (CR 615) in Fairfield	New Dutch Lane	Passaic Avenue (CR 613) in Fairfield	
CR 663	0.12	0.19	Bloomfield Avenue (CR 506 Spur) in Bloomfield	Broad Street	Broad Street (CR 509) and Franklin Street (CR 509) in Bloomfield	
CR 664	0.07	0.11	Coit Street (CR 509) and Grove Street (CR 509) in Irvington	Coit Street	Lyons Avenue (CR 602) in Irvington	
CR 665	2.22	3.57	South Orange Avenue (CR 510) in South Orange	Irvington Avenue, Clinton Avenue	Springfield Avenue (CR 603) in Irvington	
CR 667	2.12	3.41	Bloomfield Avenue (CR 506 Spur) in Newark	Broadway	Newark/Belleville border	
CR 668	0.60	0.97	Orange Road (CR 669) in Montclair	Elm Street	Bloomfield Avenue (CR 506) and Grove Street (CR 623) in Montclair	
CR 669	1.09	1.75	Ridgewood Avenue (CR 653) and Thomas Boulevard in East Orange	Orange Road	Elm Street (CR 668) in Montclair	
CR 670	0.57	0.92	Franklin Street (CR 509) and Watsessing Avenue (CR 509) in Bloomfield	Franklin Street	Franklin Avenue (CR 645) in Newark	
CR 671	0.40	0.64	Main Street (CR 659) in West Orange	Washington Street	High Street (CR 638) in Orange	
CR 672	0.61	0.98	Union Avenue (CR 647) in Belleville	Mill Street	McCarter Highway (Route 21) and Main Street in Belleville	
CR 672 Spur	0.03	0.05	Newark/Belleville border	Bridge Street	Mill Street (CR 672) in Belleville	
CR 673	0.28	0.45	Bloomfield Avenue (CR 506/CR 527) in North Caldwell	Elm Road	Mountain Avenue (CR 527) in Caldwell	
CR 677	1.02	1.64	Northfield Avenue (CR 508) in West Orange	Prospect Avenue	Prospect Avenue (CR 577) and Mount Pleasant Avenue (Route 10/CR 577) in West Orange	Signed as former designation of CR 577 Spur
