= County Route 509 (New Jersey) =

County highway in New Jersey, U.S.

County Route 509
- CR 509 highlighted in red (disconnected stub in Middlesex County is unsigned)

Route information
- Existed: January 1, 1953–present

Southern segment
- Length: 0.95 mi (1,530 m)
- South end: CR 531 / CR 602 in South Plainfield
- North end: Raritan Road at the Edison/Scotch Plains township line

Main segment
- Length: 25.78 mi (41.49 km)
- South end: Route 28 in Westfield
- Major intersections: G.S. Parkway in Kenilworth; Route 82 in Union Township; G.S. Parkway in Bloomfield; Route 3 / CR 602 in Clifton; US 46 / Route 21 in Clifton; I-80 in Paterson
- North end: CR 504 in Paterson

Location
- Country: United States
- State: New Jersey
- Counties: Middlesex, Union, Essex, Passaic

Highway system
- County routes in New Jersey; 500-series routes
← CR 508	→ CR 510

County Route 509 (CR 509) is a county highway in the U.S. state of New Jersey. The highway exists in two segments– one 0.95-mile (1.53 km) unsigned segment exists in northern Middlesex County while the signed mainline extends 25.78 miles (41.49 km) from North Avenue (Route 28) in Westfield to Straight Street (CR 504) in Paterson.

For two small stretches – in Clifton at the interchange with Route 19, and in Paterson as it crosses over the Passaic River – CR 509 splits into separate northbound and southbound alignments.

CR 509 intersects with the Garden State Parkway at exit 138 in Kenilworth and again at exit 148 in Bloomfield.

== Route description ==
The 0.95 miles (1.53 km) unsigned Middlesex County segment begins at the intersection of Park Avenue (CR 531) and Maple Avenue (CR 602) in South Plainfield. The county route, not signed as CR 509 but rather CR 602, heads northeast on Maple Avenue through a residential neighborhood. After crossing Woodland Avenue, the road enters Edison and passes between two parts of the Plainfield Country Club. CR 602 breaks off the road at Inman Avenue leaving CR 509 on Old Raritan Road continuing northeast on a locally maintained road. At the Union County line, the CR 509 designation ends and Raritan Road continues into Scotch Plains.

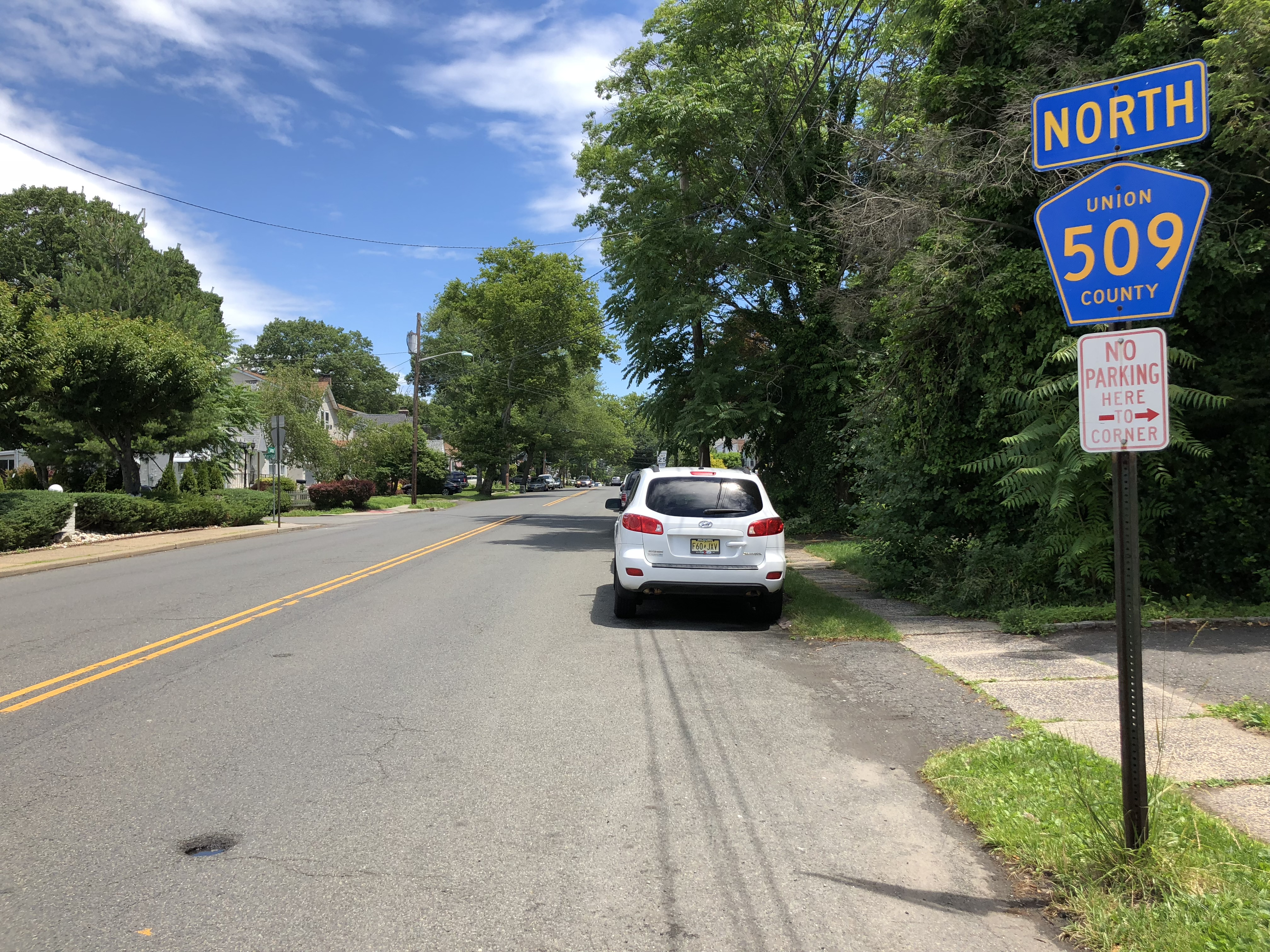
View north along CR 509 (Salem Road) at Galloping Hill Road in Union Township

The signed mainline portion of CR 509 begins at a complex intersection in the town of Westfield, seven miles (11 km) west of Elizabeth. State Route 28 (South Avenue) and Union County Route 610 (North Avenue) come from Scotch Plains to the west on either side of the train tracks running along New Jersey Transit's Raritan Valley Line and criss-cross at a traffic circle a few hundred feet from the Westfield Train Station. CR 509 (East Broad Street) branches off in a northeast direction from Route 28 just after the state highway branches off of the circle and crosses under the tracks before continuing east. From its southern terminus to Elmer Street in Westfield, the road is town maintained.

After cutting through downtown Westfield, CR 509 passes Fairview Cemetery on the right before coming to an intersection with CR 577 (Springfield Avenue), which splits off to the left before banking due north toward Mountainside, Springfield and U.S. Route 22 (US 22). CR 509 turns right onto Springfield Avenue but quickly becomes Kenilworth Boulevard. For less than a mile, the route passes through Cranford, during which time County Route 615 splits off to the right. It crosses into Kenilworth, where it is signed simply as "Boulevard" while traveling nearly due east. (East Broad Street continues straight as Nomahegan Drive for less than a mile before coming to a dead end).

Once through downtown Kenilworth, CR 509 interchanges the Garden State Parkway at Exit 138 before crossing into Union. It dips southeast for a few hundred feet, then turns left onto Salem Road at a five-point intersection with Union County routes 616 (Galloping Hill Road, bound for Roselle Park) and 619 (Chestnut Street, running between Linden and Irvington in Essex County).

Salem Road slowly bends back to the north, crossing State Route 82 near Kean University and over the Elizabeth River into Hillside, where it passes Vaux Hall Road and Hillside High School. CR 509 passes under US 22, but has no interchange. Traffic looking to access US 22 must turn right just beyond the overpass at Hillside Avenue, where access is provided near the Newark border. CR 509 turns left onto Hillside Avenue, while the road (now Liberty Road) continues to a dead end at St. Peter's Park on the outskirts of Newark.

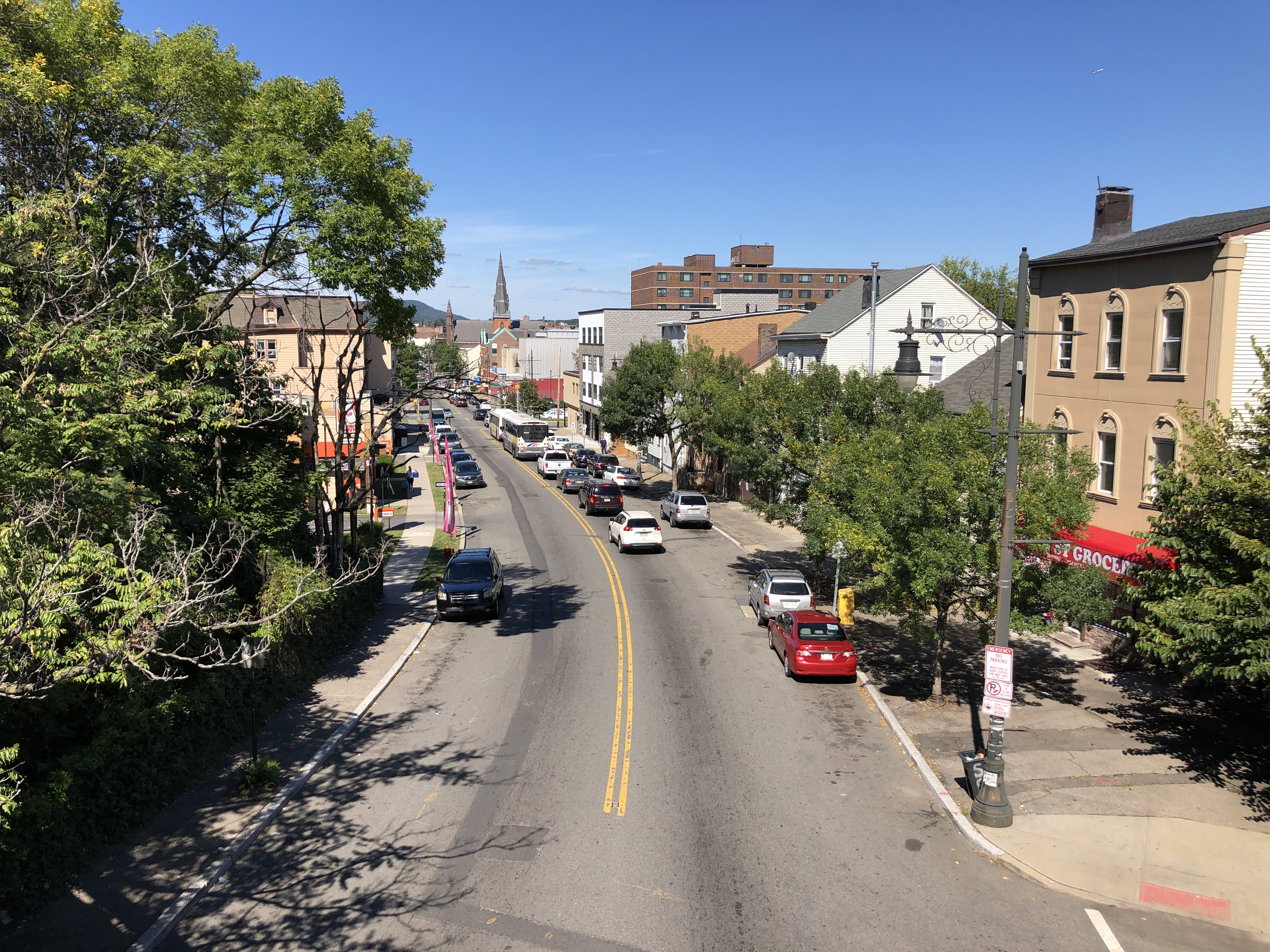
View northbound along CR 509 from I-80 in Paterson

After turning, CR 509 makes another quick turn, this time onto Chestnut Avenue. It passes over Interstate 78 (again with no interchange), to which access is available via Paine Avenue. The route continues as Coit Street, then Grove Street as it moves into Irvington and Essex County.

Now in a heavily populated neighborhood, CR 509 crosses Springfield Avenue a little east of the end of the State Route 124 designation, and crosses several 600-series routes while closely paralleling the Parkway. It intersects CR 510 (South Orange Avenue) at the massive Cemetery of the Holy Sepulchre, then moves into Newark for about half a mile, then enters East Orange where it meets CR 508 (Central Avenue). Shortly thereafter, it interchanges with Interstate 280, providing access to Newark, the Oranges and the Parkway.

CR 509 continues north into Bloomfield, where it turns left onto Franklin Street. It crosses back under the Garden State Parkway before moving into Passaic County, through the cities of Clifton and Paterson, where it ends at CR 504.

== History ==
The two segments of CR 509 were previously connected through southern Union County via Raritan Road, Martine Avenue, West Broad Street, and Route 28.

== Major intersections ==
County	Location	mi	km	Destinations	Notes
Middlesex	South Plainfield	0.00	0.00	CR 531 (Park Avenue) / CR 602 west (Maple Avenue)	Unsigned southern terminus; eastern terminus of CR 602
Middlesex–Union county line	Edison–Scotch Plains line	0.95	1.53	Raritan Road	Unsigned northern terminus
Gap in route
Union	Westfield	7.03	11.31	Route 28 (North Avenue)	Southern terminus
Union	Westfield	8.99	14.47	CR 577 north – Springfield	Southern terminus of CR 577
Union	Kenilworth	11.67– 11.87	18.78– 19.10	G.S. Parkway	Exit 138 on G.S. Parkway
Union	Union Township	13.97	22.48	Route 82 (Morris Avenue) – Springfield, Elizabeth	
Essex	Newark	18.58– 18.59	29.90– 29.92	CR 510 (South Orange Avenue)	
Essex	East Orange	19.17	30.85	CR 508 (Central Avenue)	
Essex	Bloomfield	21.33	34.33	CR 506 Spur (Bloomfield Avenue)	
Essex	Bloomfield	22.52	36.24	G.S. Parkway	Exit 148 on G.S. Parkway
Essex	Bloomfield	23.22	37.37	CR 506 (Belleville Avenue)	
Passaic	Clifton	27.47– 27.56	44.21– 44.35	Route 3 / CR 602 (Allwood Road)	Interchange
Passaic	Clifton	28.92	46.54	Route 19 begins	
Passaic	Clifton	29.05	46.75	US 46 east	Interchange; no southbound exit
Passaic	Clifton	29.05	46.75	US 46 west – Dover	Interchange; southbound exit and northbound entrance
Passaic	Clifton	29.38	47.28	Route 19 north	Interchange; northbound exit and southbound entrance; northern end of Route 19 concurrency
Passaic	Paterson	31.22– 31.51	50.24– 50.71	I-80 east	Exit 57C on I-80
Passaic	Paterson	31.87	51.29	Route 19 south	Northern terminus of Route 19
Passaic	Paterson	32.81	52.80	CR 504 (North Straight Street)	Northern terminus
1.000 mi = 1.609 km; 1.000 km = 0.621 mi: Concurrency terminus; Incomplete access

== CR 509 Spur ==
County Route 509 Spur
- Location: Westfield–Springfield Township
- Length: 2.98 mi (4.80 km)

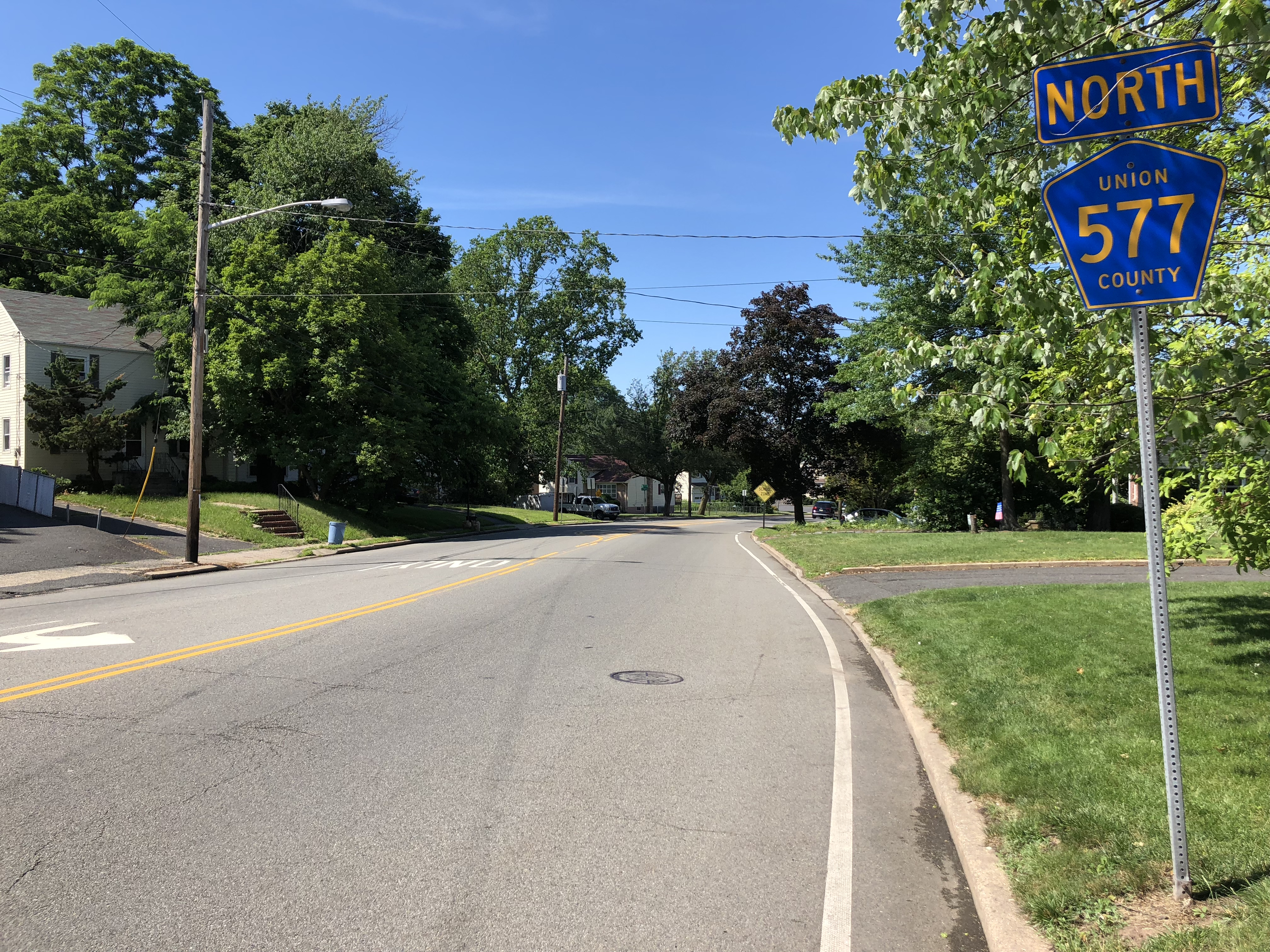
View north along former CR 509 Spur (now signed as CR 577) at Hillside Avenue (CR 634) in Springfield

County Route 509 Spur was a county highway in Union County. The highway extended 2.98 miles (4.80 km) from Broad Street (CR 509) in Westfield to Route 124 in Springfield, via Old Raritan Road, Broad Street, Springfield Avenue, and Meisel Avenue. It passes through or by the Plainfield County Club, Ash Brook Golf Course, Ponderosa Farm Park, Midowaskin Park, Fairview Cemetery, Echo Lake Country Club, and Meisel Avenue Park

The road is now part of a southern extension of CR 577.

Major intersections
The entire route was in Union County.

Location	mi	km	Destinations	Notes
Westfield	0.00	0.00	CR 509 (Broad Street) to G.S. Parkway – Kenilworth, Westfield	Southern terminus
Springfield Township	0.93	1.50	US 22 – Somerville, Newark	Interchange
Springfield Township	2.98	4.80	Route 124	Northern terminus
1.000 mi = 1.609 km; 1.000 km = 0.621 mi
