= County Route 510 (New Jersey) =

County highway in New Jersey, U.S.

County Route 510
- CR 510 highlighted in red

Route information
- Length: 29.58 mi (47.60 km)
- Existed: January 1, 1953–present

Major junctions
- West end: CR 513 in Chester
- CR 525 in Mendham; US 202 / Route 124 in Morristown; I-287 in Morristown; CR 511 in Morristown; Route 24 in Hanover Township; CR 527 in Millburn; CR 577 in South Orange; G.S. Parkway in Newark; CR 509 in Newark
- East end: Route 21 in Newark

Location
- Country: United States
- State: New Jersey
- Counties: Morris, Essex

Highway system
- County routes in New Jersey; 500-series routes
← CR 509	→ CR 511

County Route 510 (CR 510) is a county highway in the U.S. state of New Jersey. The highway extends 29.58 miles (47.60 km) from North Road (CR 513) in Chester to McCarter Highway (Route 21) in Newark.

A separate, westbound portion of CR 510 stretches 1.21 miles (1.95 km) through Morristown.

== Route description ==
=== Morris County ===
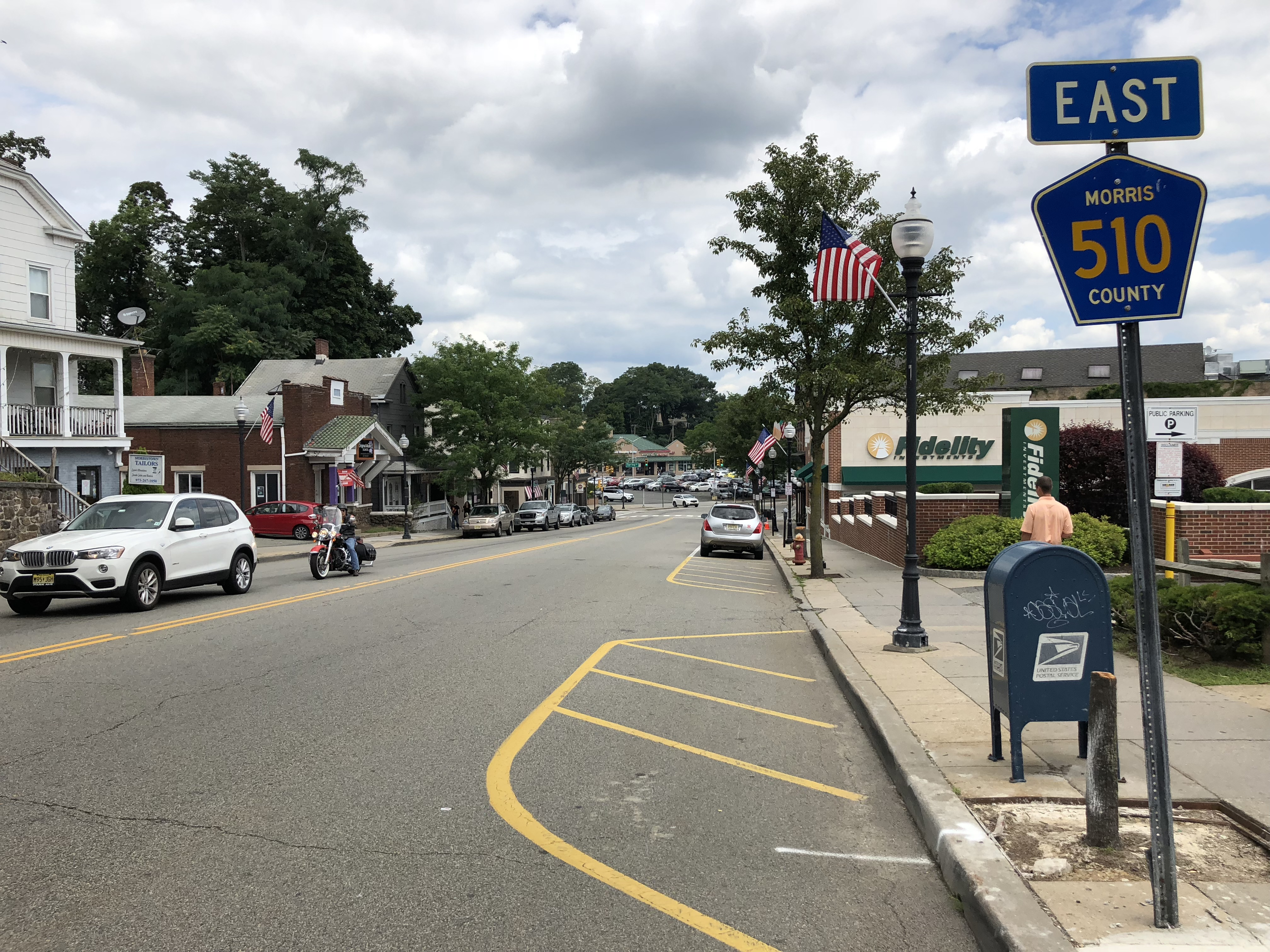
CR 510 eastbound on Morris Street in Morristown

CR 510 begins at an intersection with CR 513 in Chester Borough, Morris County, heading southeast on two-lane undivided Main Street. From the western terminus, CR 510 is signed as part of the former Route 24, which continues west along CR 513. The road passes through residential areas as it crosses into Chester Township and becomes Mendham Road, continuing southeast through more wooded areas of homes along with a few fields. The route curves east and continues into Mendham Township. Farther east, CR 510 continues into Mendham Borough and becomes Main Street, running through residential neighborhoods. In the commercial center of town, the route intersects CR 525 and CR 614. From this point, the road turns northeast and passes more homes as well as a few businesses, intersecting CR 646 before crossing back into Mendham Township. CR 510 runs east again near more residences before entering Morris Township and becomes Mendham Road again. Here, the road runs through forested areas near Lewis Morris Park before running through more woodland with a few homes. The route begins to turn more to the northeast as it enters more residential surroundings before crossing into Morristown. At this point, CR 510 heads east on Washington Street and passes homes and businesses. The road reaches the commercial downtown and intersects CR 648 before meeting US 202 and the western terminus of Route 124 at the Park Place square.

After running through the square, CR 510 leaves the former alignment of Route 24 and continues east onto Morris Street, passing more downtown businesses. Along this stretch, CR 510 splits into a one-way pair, with the eastbound direction continuing east on Morris Street, which is a two-way road, and the westbound direction following Lafayette Street, which is one-way westbound carrying three lanes. Both directions cross under New Jersey Transit's Morristown Line near the Morristown Station. The eastbound alignment of the route becomes three lanes with two eastbound lanes and one westbound lane after the railroad bridge, passing through commercial areas before running near a few homes, while the westbound direction passes businesses. Both directions of the route come to an interchange with I-287. From this interchange, eastbound CR 510 runs through residential areas as a one-way road with three lanes while westbound CR 510 passes through woodland. The two directions of CR 510 join again at an intersection with CR 511 on the border of Morristown and Morris Township. westbound CR 510 runs northeast along two-way, four-lane divided Whippany Road and southeast and intersects CR 511 as it turns southeast onto Columbia Turnpike. After the one-way pair, CR 510 heads east on four-lane undivided Columbia Turnpike past business parks and residential neighborhoods in Morris Township, eventually gaining a third eastbound lane. The route becomes a four-lane divided highway as it crosses CR 623 and enters Hanover Township as it comes to a cloverleaf interchange with the Route 24 freeway. Following this, the road continues into Florham Park as a four-lane undivided road as it passes to the south of Morristown Municipal Airport and runs through woods and meadows. The road passes homes before intersecting CR 608/CR 632 and CR 609 in a commercial area, at which point CR 510 is briefly a divided highway. The route curves southeast and passes near more residential neighborhoods prior to widening back into a divided highway and passing to the south of business parks.

=== Essex County ===
Upon crossing the Passaic River, CR 510 enters Livingston in Essex County and becomes four-lane undivided South Orange Avenue as it runs through wooded areas with some business parks. After an intersection with the southern terminus of the Eisenhower Parkway (CR 609), the route becomes a divided highway again and passes between the Livingston Mall to the north and a branch of Cooperman Barnabas Medical Center to the south. After crossing CR 607, the road becomes undivided again and passes to the south of residential neighborhoods before running through dense forests. In this area, CR 510 crosses CR 649, where it is briefly a grade-separated divided highway, before becoming undivided and crossing CR 608. From here, the route enters residential areas and crosses into Millburn, coming to the junction with CR 527. A short distance past CR 527, the road heads east into the forested South Mountain Reservation, a part of the Watchung Mountains. In this area, the road becomes a divided highway again and crosses the West Branch of the Rahway River into Maplewood. The route passes under a bridal path and winds southeast through the reservation (known locally as the "S Curves"), becoming the border between South Orange to the north and Maplewood to the south as it leaves the South Mountain Reservation and enters residential areas. A $30 million project to rework the "S curves" for safety and drainage is in progress.

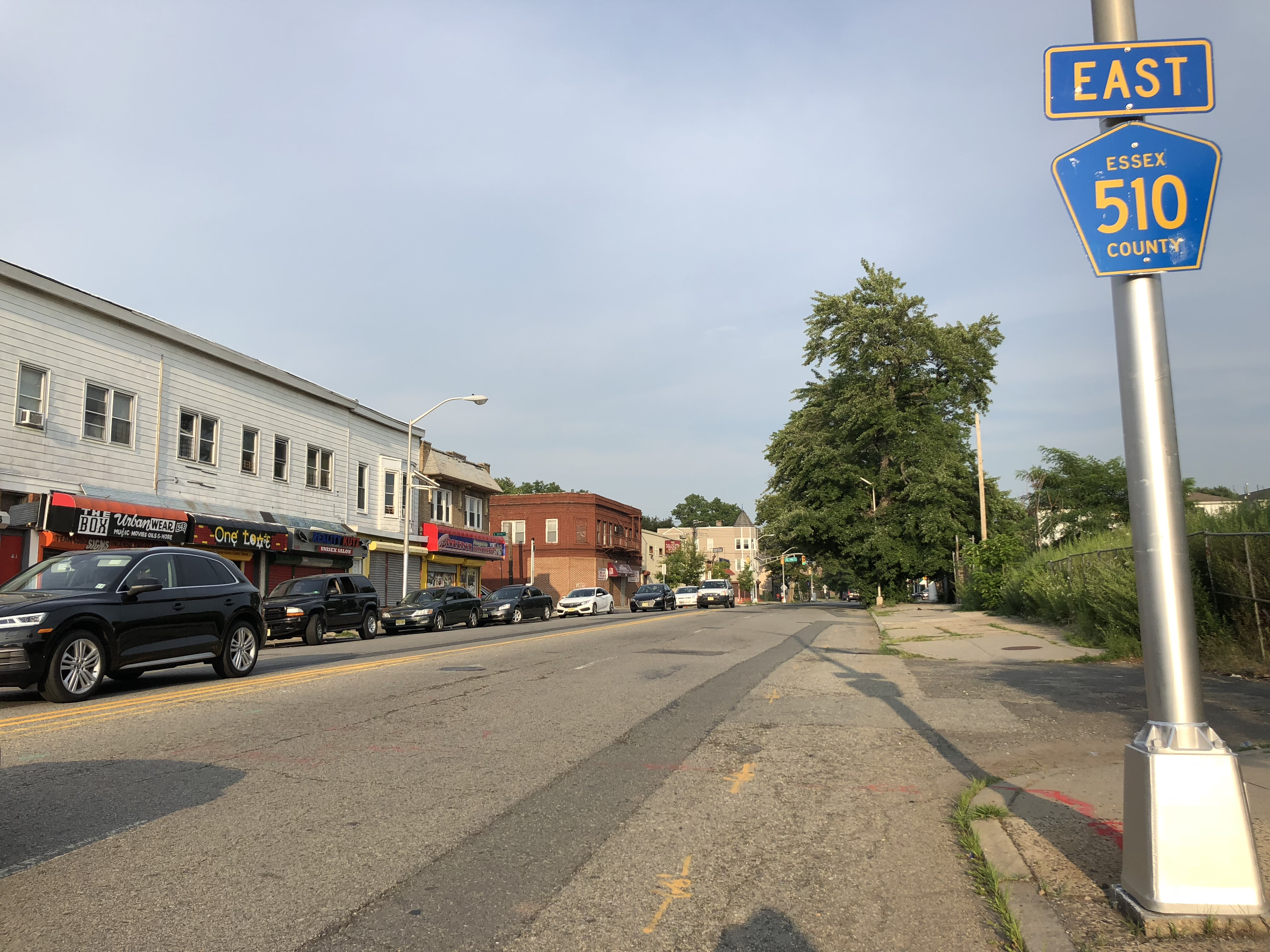
View east along CR 510 (South Orange Avenue) just east of CR 509 (Grove Street) in Newark

CR 510 becomes undivided again as it fully enters South Orange and continues east through wooded areas of homes, forming a brief concurrency with CR 577. The road heads into the commercial downtown of South Orange as it passes over the East Branch of the Rahway River and under New Jersey Transit's Morris & Essex Lines near the South Orange Station. The route intersects CR 638 Spur, CR 638, and CR 665 before passing near more homes and running to the north of Seton Hall University. CR 510 enters Newark at the Longfellow Avenue/Dover Street intersection and continues east into more commercial areas. The road crosses CR 605 and becomes the border between East Orange to the north and Newark to the south as it comes to the CR 619 junction. CR 510 fully enters Newark again as it comes to an interchange with the Garden State Parkway before passing to the south of Holy Sepulchre Cemetery and forming a brief concurrency with CR 509 a short distance later. The road passes south of Fairmount Cemetery and passes several urban homes and businesses, narrowing to two lanes before passing the University of Medicine and Dentistry of New Jersey, where the route is five lanes wide with two eastbound lanes and three westbound lanes. CR 510 narrows to two lanes again as it intersects CR 603, where the route turns northeast onto Springfield Avenue. At this point, the route enters Downtown Newark and turns east onto four-lane Market Street near the Essex County Veterans Courthouse. At the Broad Street intersection, the road passes through Four Corners, which serves as the center of Newark. CR 510 comes to its eastern terminus at an intersection with Route 21 near Newark Penn Station, with Market Street continuing east under Amtrak's Northeast Corridor to provide access to Raymond Boulevard.

== History ==
The section running from Chester to Morristown was originally created as part of the Washington Turnpike, which stretched from Morristown to Philipsburg. This road was later incorporated into the William Penn Highway, which ran from New York to Pittsburgh. This was incorporated into Route 24 in 1927, before being removed by 1992. The section running from Morristown to Newark was created as the Columbia Turnpike. County Route 513 was established largely along its present-day alignment in 1952, along with the other 500-series county highways. The original eastern terminus was likely at Springfield Avenue in Newark, which was at the time Route 24. When that highway was truncated to the Maplewood/Irvington line, the segment of Route 24 east of South Orange Avenue was made part of CR 510; the route extended east of Route 21 along Market Street and Raymond Boulevard to an eastern terminus at the intersection of U.S. Route 1/9 and U.S. Route 1/9 Truck on the very eastern edge of Newark. This routing definitely existed in 1973, though the exact start and end dates are uncertain.

== Major intersections ==
County	Location	mi	km	Destinations	Notes
Morris	Chester Borough	0.00	0.00	CR 513 (North Road / Main Street) to US 206 / Route 10 – Dover, Randolph, Long Valley	Western terminus
Morris	Mendham Borough	4.83	7.77	CR 525 south (Hilltop Road) – Bernardsville	Northern terminus of CR 525
Morris	Morristown	11.65	18.75	US 202 south (Bank Street) / Route 124 east (South Street) – Basking Ridge, Convent Station, Morris Plains	Morristown Green; western end of US 202 concurrency; western terminus of Route 124
Morris	Morristown	11.80	18.99	US 202 north (Park Place)	Morristown Green; eastern end of US 202 concurrency
Morris	Morristown	12.42	19.99	I-287 – Boonton, Somerville	Exit 36 on I-287
Morris	Morristown	12.91	20.78	CR 511 north (Whippany Road) – Whippany	Southern terminus of CR 511
Morris	Hanover Township	14.60	23.50	Route 24 to I-287 – Springfield	Exit 2 on Route 24
Essex	Livingston	18.54	29.84	CR 609 north (Eisenhower Parkway) to I-280 / Route 10	Southern terminus of CR 609
Essex	Millburn	21.60	34.76	CR 527 (Old Short Hills Road)	
Essex	South Orange	23.68	38.11	CR 577 south (South Wyoming Avenue)	Western end of CR 577 concurrency
Essex	South Orange	23.79	38.29	CR 577 north (North Wyoming Avenue)	Eastern end of CR 577 concurrency
Essex	Newark	26.95	43.37	G.S. Parkway	Exit 144 on G.S. Parkway
Essex	Newark	27.10	43.61	CR 509 north (Grove Street)	Western end of CR 509 concurrency
Essex	Newark	27.12	43.65	CR 509 south (Grove Street)	Eastern end of CR 509 concurrency
Essex	Newark	29.58	47.60	Route 21	Eastern terminus
1.000 mi = 1.609 km; 1.000 km = 0.621 mi: Concurrency terminus; Tolled
