= New Jersey Route 124 =

State highway in northern New Jersey, US

Route 124

Route information
- Auxiliary route of Route 24
- Maintained by NJDOT and Township of Maplewood
- Length: 14.74 mi (23.72 km)
- Existed: 1972–present

Major junctions
- West end: US 202 / CR 510 in Morristown
- I-287 in Morristown; Route 24 / CR 649 in Millburn; Route 24 / CR 512 in Springfield; CR 527 in Springfield; Route 82 / CR 577 in Springfield; I-78 in Springfield
- East end: CR 603 on the Maplewood/Irvington township line

Location
- Country: United States
- State: New Jersey
- Counties: Morris, Essex, Union

Highway system
- New Jersey State Highway Routes; Interstate; US; State; Scenic Byways
← Route 122	→ Route 129

Route 124 is a state highway in the northern part of New Jersey in the United States that is 14.74 mi (23.72 km) long. It is the eastern section of what used to be Route 24 before that road was realigned to its current freeway alignment. The western end is at an intersection with U.S. Route 202 (US 202) and County Route 510 (CR 510) in Morristown, Morris County; the eastern end continues as CR 603 on Springfield Avenue at the border between Maplewood and Irvington in Essex County. The route runs through suburban areas of Morris County, passing through Madison and Chatham. It intersects Route 24 on the border of Millburn, Essex County and Summit, Union County, and serves as a frontage road for that route. Upon splitting from Route 24, Route 124 continues east through Springfield Township, Union Township, and Maplewood to its eastern terminus.

The alignment of today's Route 124 was first designated as a part of pre-1927 Route 5 in 1916, a route that was to run from Delaware, Warren County, to Newark. In 1927, this portion of the route became a part of Route 24, a route that was to run from Phillipsburg to Newark. A freeway, which is the current alignment of Route 24, was proposed for this portion of the route in the 1950s that was approved in 1960. Route 24 was moved to the new freeway between the John F. Kennedy Parkway on the Millburn/Summit border and Interstate 78 (I-78) in 1972, with Route 124 being designated along the former alignment of Route 24 east of this point. In 1992, the Route 24 freeway was completed between I-287 in Hanover Township and the John F. Kennedy Parkway. As a result, Route 124 was extended west along the former Route 24 to US 202 in Morristown.

== Route description ==
=== Morris County ===
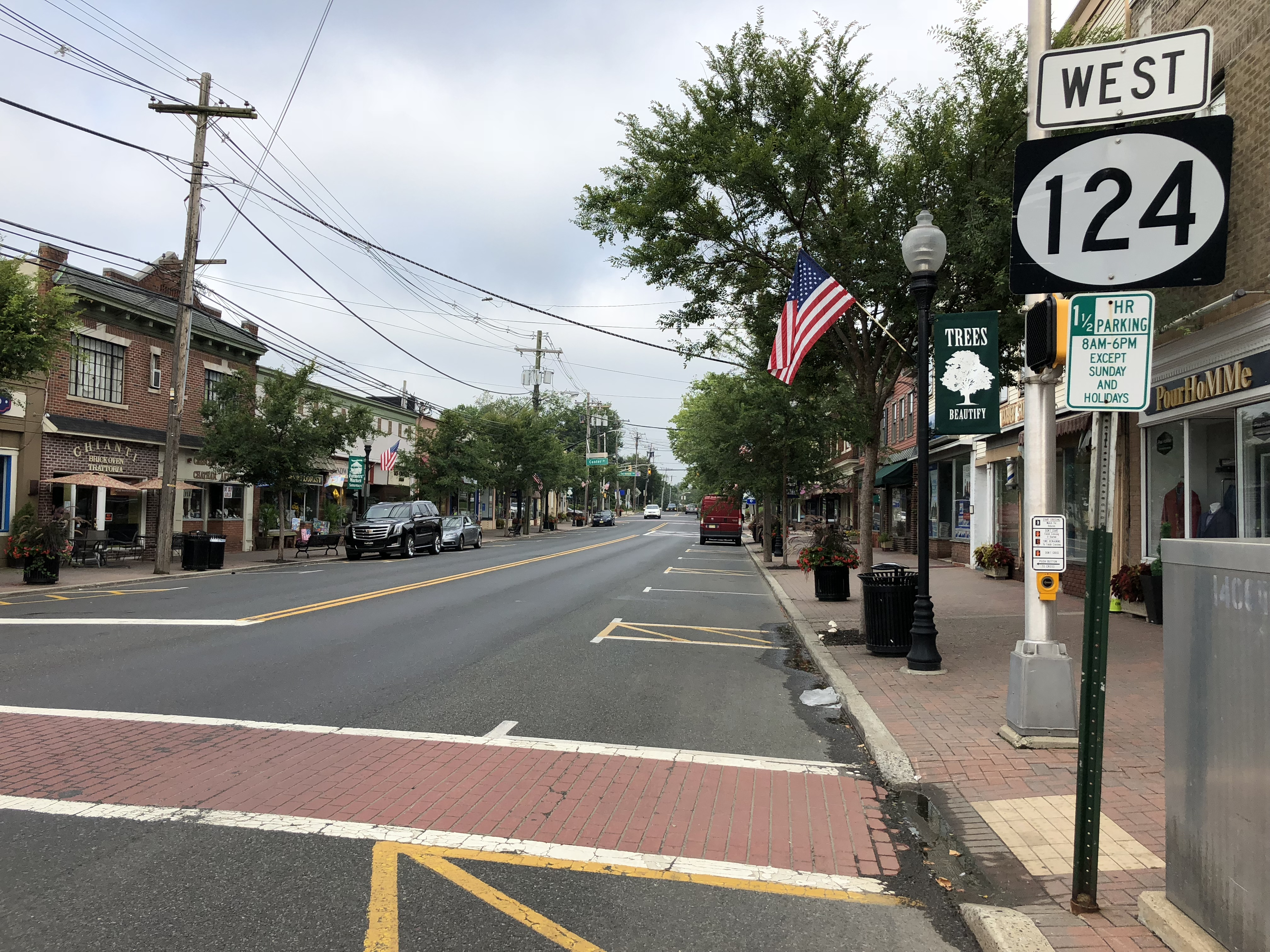
Westbound Route 124 at CR 607 in Chatham

Route 124 begins at the intersection of US 202 and CR 510 at the Park Place square in the downtown of Morristown, Morris County. From here, it heads to the southeast as South Street, a two-lane undivided road that passes businesses. At the intersection with CR 663, the road widens to four lanes. A short distance later, CR 601 continues southeast on South Street and Route 124 bears left to head east on Madison Avenue, coming to an interchange with I-287. Past this interchange, the road passes Morristown Memorial Hospital and continues through mainly commercial areas with some homes. At the intersection with Normandy Parkway, the route turns to the southeast and enters Morris Township, where it narrows to two lanes again, with NJ Transit's Morristown Line running a short distance to the northeast of the route near the Morris County Golf Club. Route 124 continues into more residential areas and crosses into Madison.

Here, the route passes near some business parks before intersecting CR 636, where it is briefly a four-lane road. Past this intersection, the road passes between residential neighborhoods to the northeast and Drew University to the southwest. Route 124 crosses over the Morristown Line near James Park and becomes Main Street, heading southeast through the commercial downtown of Madison. Here, the road intersects CR 647 and CR 608. Past the Rosedale Avenue intersection, the route heads into a mix of residential and business areas. Route 124 enters Chatham at the intersection with Brooklake Road/Division Avenue. In the center of the town, the route intersects CR 638 and CR 607 before continuing east.

=== Essex and Union counties ===
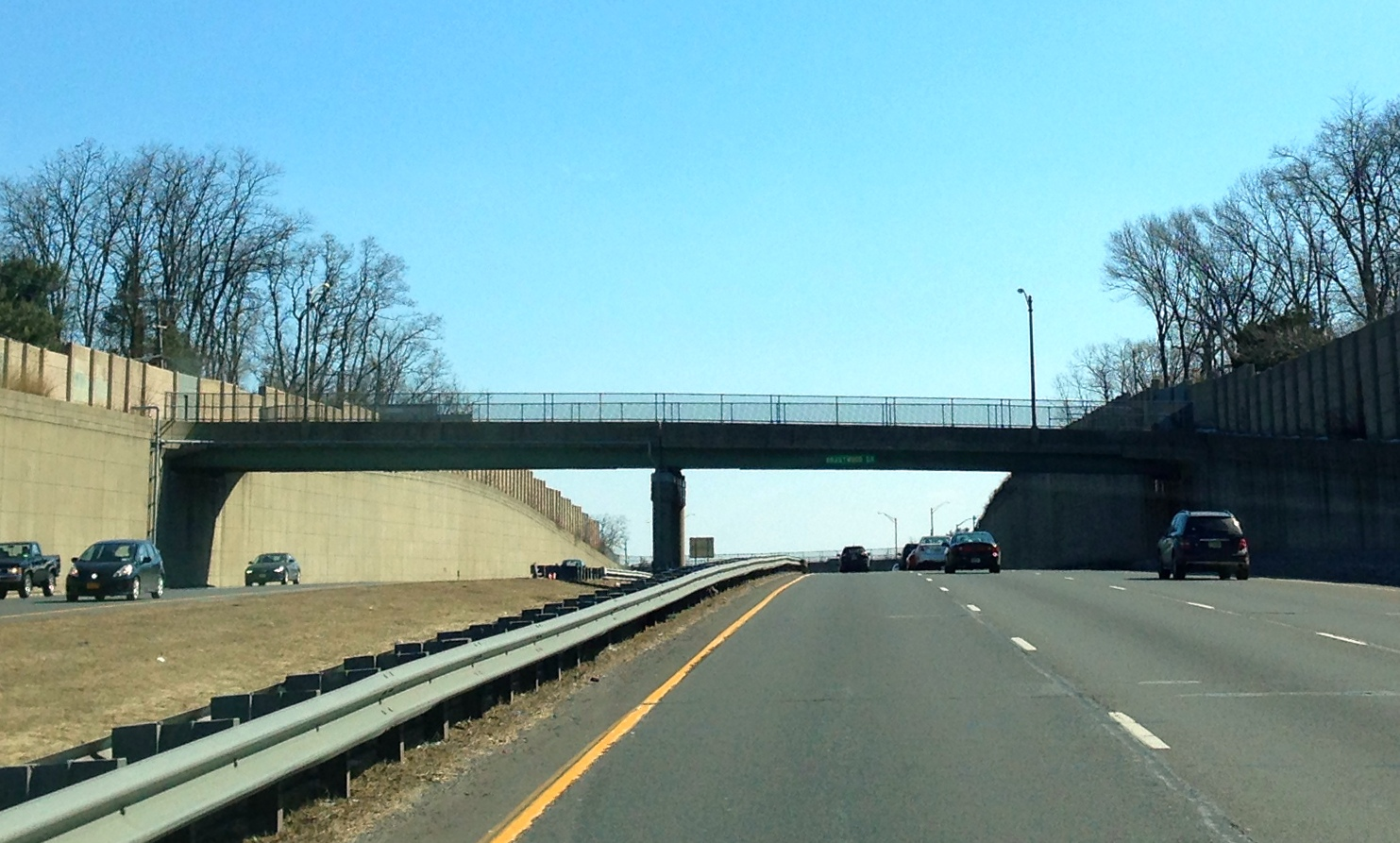
Overpass to nowhere seen from Route 24 in Summit, walled off on both ends to close the Brantwood Drive intersection with Route 124

Route 124 crosses the Passaic River and runs along the border of Millburn, Essex County, to the north and Summit, Union County, coming to a large interchange with the Route 24 freeway and CR 649 (John F. Kennedy Parkway). Here, the route becomes a frontage road for the Route 24 freeway that has two lanes in each direction. The road passes to the south of The Mall at Short Hills before running through the Canoe Brook Country Club. It heads southeast into wooded residential neighborhoods and intersects CR 657, where the Route 124 frontage road has ramps to Route 24. A short distance later, the route passes an overpass to nowhere that crosses over Route 24 at Brantwood Drive which was closed and walled off. The Route 124 frontage road has since eliminated the intersection at Brantwood Drive. In 2013, City of Summit vacated the 50-foot (15 m) public right-of-way of the old road section from Route 124 into the current Brantwood Drive. In a short distance, Route 124 intersects CR 608, at which point the route has an eastbound ramp to eastbound Route 24 and a westbound ramp from westbound Route 24. Past this intersection, the Route 124 frontage road along Route 24 ends and the route becomes a two-lane undivided road called South Service Road that closely parallels the north side of Route 24, passing under the Morristown Line. The route heads past businesses and forms the border of Millburn to the north and Springfield Township, Union County, to the south, coming to an intersection with CR 512 near an interchange with Route 24. There is a direct ramp from westbound Route 124 to Route 24 a short distance to the northwest of this intersection.

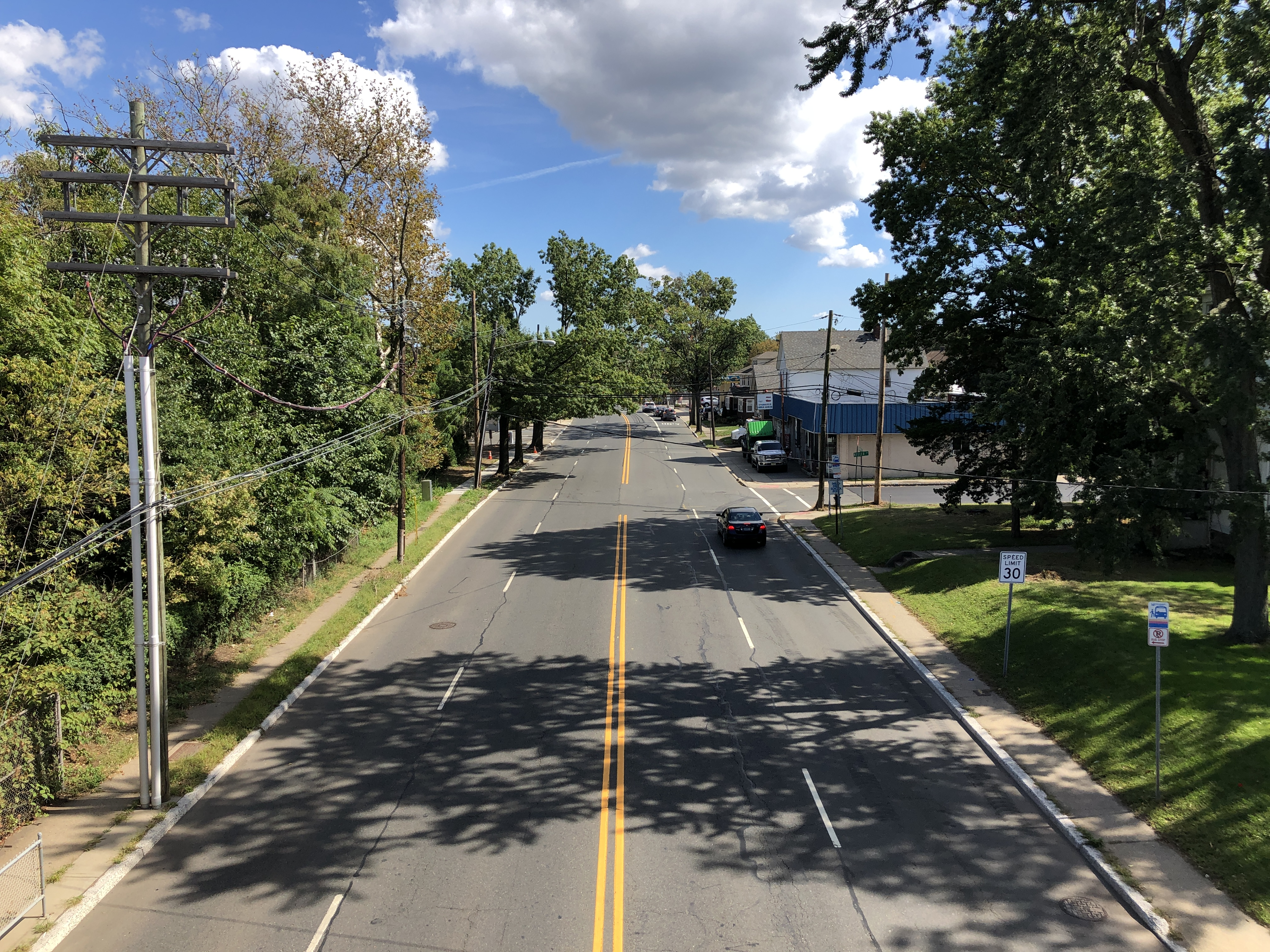
View eastbound along Route 124 from I-78 in Springfield

From here, the route passes more commercial establishments as a four-lane road, heading farther from Route 24, before crossing CR 527. At this intersection, Route 124 entirely enters Springfield Township and becomes Morris Avenue, passing a mix of residences and businesses. The route passes under I-78 without an interchange and becomes a two-lane road that passes through the downtown of Springfield, eventually widening to four lanes again. In this area, it intersects CR 635. Route 124 comes to a circular junction with Route 82 and CR 577. Here, Route 82 continues southeast on Morris Avenue, CR 509 Spur heads south, and CR 577 heads north. Route 124, meanwhile, briefly splits into a one-way pair here. The eastbound direction heads south on Meisel Avenue before turning north along Maple Avenue while the westbound direction follows Springfield Avenue. The two directions of Route 124 rejoin and follow four-lane divided Springfield Avenue northeast to a crossing of the Rahway River and a partial interchange with I-78. Here, there are ramps from the local lanes of eastbound I-78 to both directions of Route 124, to the local lanes of westbound I-78 and Route 24 from both directions of Route 124, and to the express lanes of westbound I-78 from westbound Route 124.

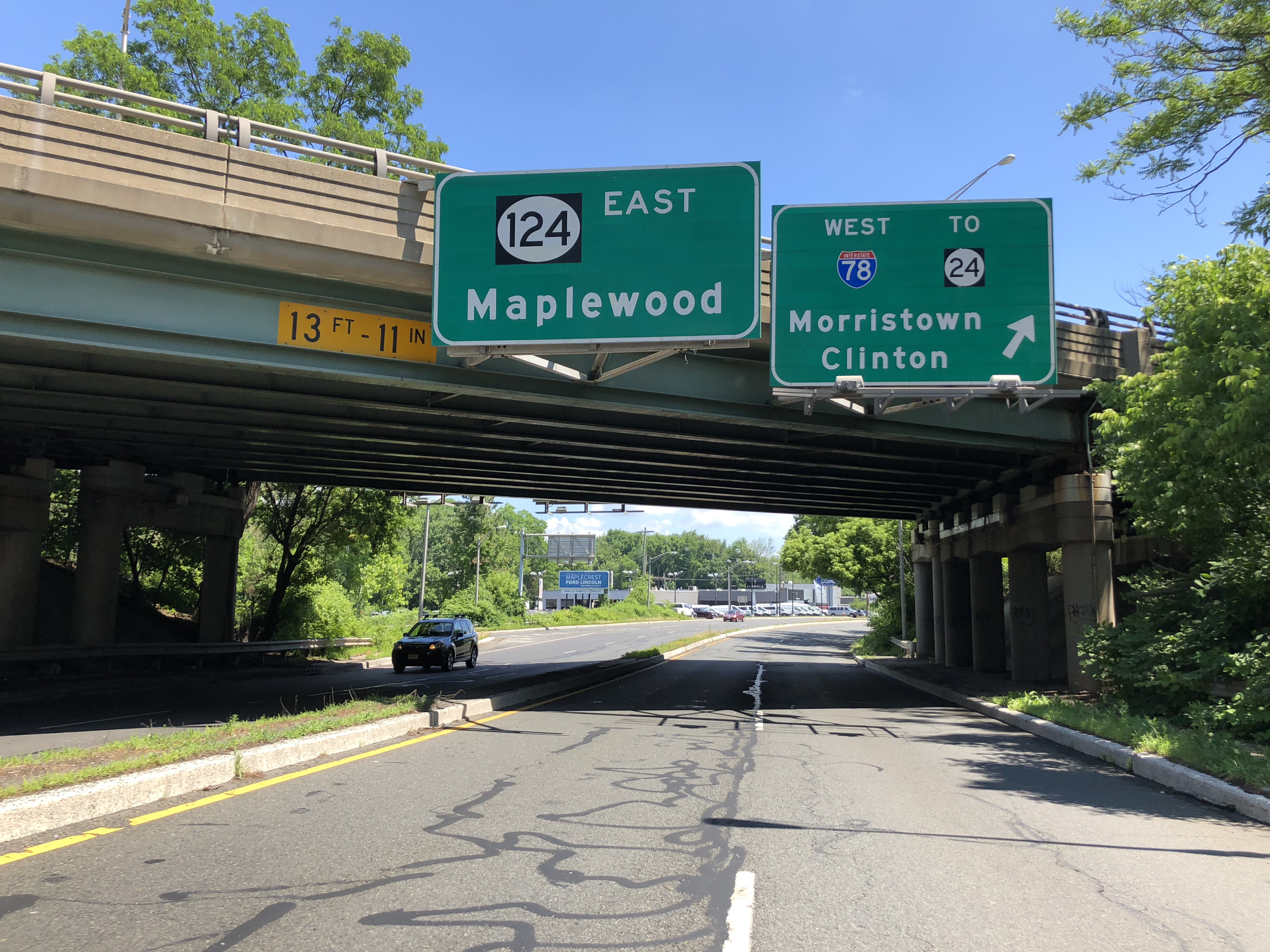
Route 124 eastbound at exit for I-78 westbound in Union Township

Past this interchange, the route enters Union Township and continues east through developed areas, intersecting CR 638 before narrowing into a two-lane undivided road and intersecting CR 630. It continues through more urban commercial areas before intersecting CR 630 again. At this point, Route 124 crosses into Maplewood, Essex County, and becomes a three-lane road with a center left-turn lane that is locally maintained. This road heads east through the downtown of Maplewood, coming to an intersection with CR 601. A short distance later, the Route 124 designation ends at the border of Maplewood and Irvington. From this point, Springfield Avenue continues east as CR 603, which heads toward Newark and ends at CR 510, which follows Springfield Avenue for a short distance before becoming Market Street.

== History ==
What is modern-day Route 124 was created as part of two turnpikes; the Morris Turnpike, running from Elizabeth to Newton, and the Springfield and Newark Turnpike, from Springfield to Newark. The road was later incorporated into the William Penn Highway, which ran from Jersey City to Pittsburgh, before being designated as a part of pre-1927 Route 5, a route that was legislated in 1916 to run from Delaware, Warren County, east to Newark. In the 1927 New Jersey state highway renumbering, this portion of pre-1927 Route 5 became a part of Route 24, a road that was to run from Phillipsburg to Newark. In the 1950s, plans were made to bypass this portion of Route 24 with a freeway running from I-287 in Hanover Township to I-78 in Springfield Township; this was approved of in 1960. This freeway was completed between I-78 and the John F. Kennedy Parkway in 1972. The Route 24 designation was moved to the new freeway and Route 124 was designated along the former alignment of Route 24 east of this point, which included frontage roads built where the new freeway ran along the old alignment of the road. Following the completion of the Route 24 freeway to I-287 in 1992, Route 124 was extended west along the former alignment of Route 24 between the John F. Kennedy Parkway and US 202 in Morristown. In 2002, maintenance of the portion of Route 124 in Maplewood was transferred to the municipality from the New Jersey Department of Transportation (NJDOT).

== Major intersections ==
County	Location	mi	km	Destinations	Notes
Morris	Morristown	0.00	0.00	US 202 / CR 510 (Park Place)	Morristown Green; western terminus
Morris	Morristown	0.86	1.38	I-287	Exit 35 on I-287
Essex	Millburn	7.44	11.97	Route 24 / JFK Parkway / River Road (CR 649) to I-280 – Summit, Livingston, Caldwell	Exits 7A–C on Route 24
Essex	Millburn	8.35	13.44	Route 24 / CR 657 south (Summit Avenue)	Exit 8 on Route 24; northern terminus of CR 657
Essex	Millburn	8.96	14.42	Route 24 / CR 608 (Hobart Gap Road / Hobart Avenue)	Exit 9B on Route 24
Union	Springfield Township	9.89	15.92	Route 24 west / CR 512 west (Broad Street) – Summit	Exit 9A on Route 24; eastern terminus of CR 512
Union	Springfield Township	10.27	16.53	CR 527 (Morris Avenue / Millburn Avenue) – Millburn	
Union	Springfield Township	11.30– 11.54	18.19– 18.57	Route 82 east (Morris Avenue) / CR 577 (Meisel Avenue / Main Street) – Union, Cranford	Western terminus of Route 82
Union	Springfield Township	12.10– 12.13	19.47– 19.52	I-78 west to Route 24 west – Morristown, Clinton	Exit 49 on I-78
Essex	Maplewood–Irvington line	14.74	23.72	CR 603 east (Springfield Avenue)	Continuation east
1.000 mi = 1.609 km; 1.000 km = 0.621 mi
