= Elizabeth River (New Jersey) =

River in Union County, New Jersey, U.S.

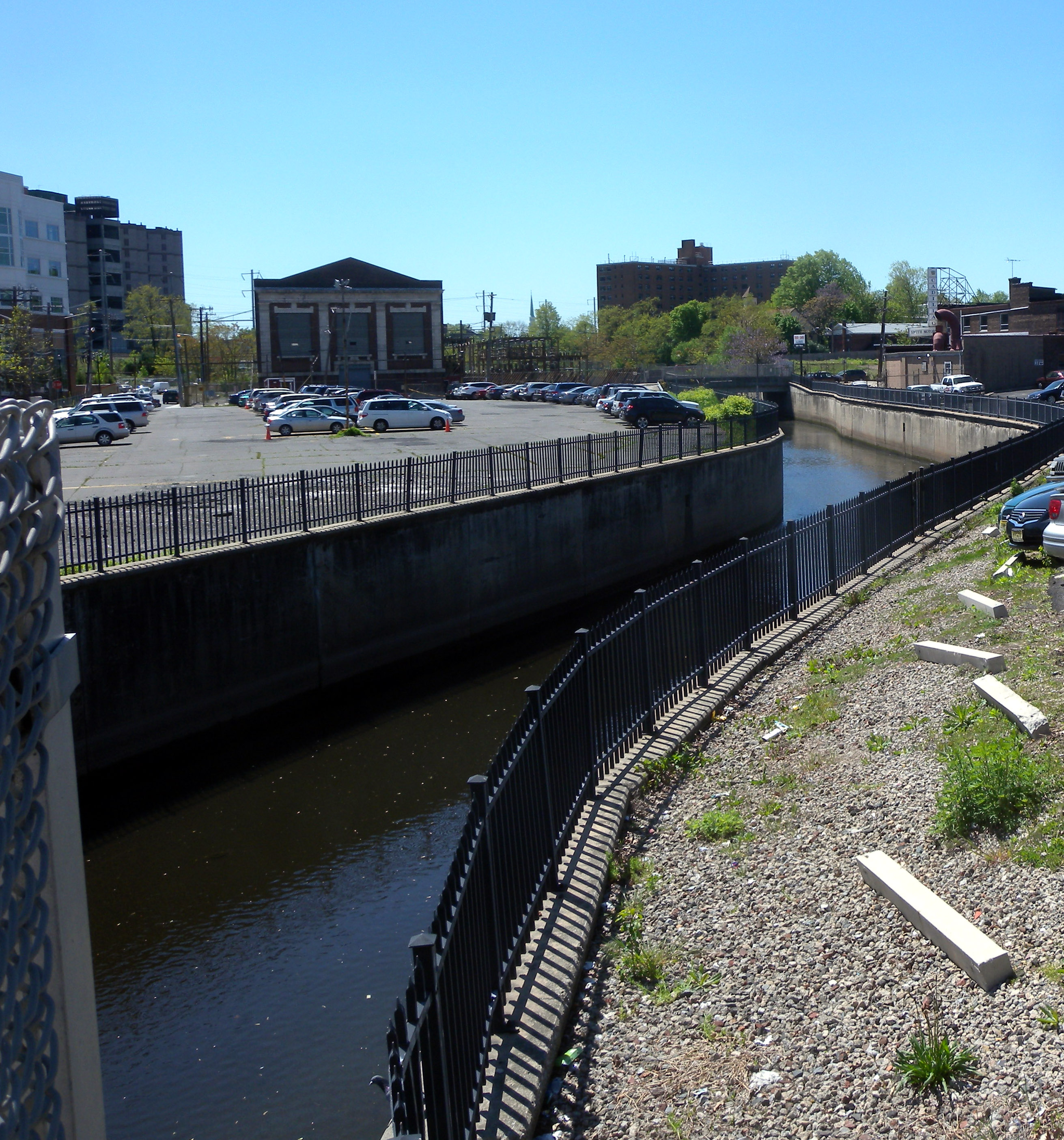
- Midtown/Downtown Elizabeth

Location
- Country: United States
- State: New Jersey
- Region: Essex; Union

Physical characteristics
- Source: Watchung Mountains
  - location: surfaces Irvington/Newark
  - coordinates: 40.736566°N 74.228531°W
- Mouth: Arthur Kill
  - location: Elizabeth
  - coordinates: 40°38′39″N 74°11′24″W
  - elevation: 0 ft (0 m)
- Length: 11.9 mi (19.2 km)
- Discharge
  - location: Arthur Kill

The Elizabeth River runs through Essex and Union counties, New Jersey in the United States for 11.9 miles (19.2 km) before draining into the Arthur Kill.

== Course ==
The headwaters of the Elizabeth are in East Orange in Essex County. The river rises in an urban area at the border between Irvington and the Vailsburg neighborhood of Newark. It flows in a generally southern direction through the center of Irvington in a concrete channel with masonry walls built in the 1920s and 30s passing along the east side of Civic Square. Further south, it forms the west boundary of the 19th century Clinton Cemetery. At the southern end of the cemetery, the river passes under the Garden State Parkway near Exit 143 and disappears as a surface waterway.

The Elizabeth River reemerges just south of the Union County line near Garden State Parkway Interchange 142 between Union and Hillside. After passing under I-78 it runs through the Elizabeth River Parkway. Here, the river is joined on its left bank by its first significant tributary, Lightning Brook. The Elizabeth River then flows under the Garden State Parkway again. After passing under US 22, the river turns eastward and is joined by the West Branch Elizabeth River. The river then flows past historic Liberty Hall and Kean University. Much of the river is contained by levees in this section.

At Trotters Lane, the river enters Elizabeth, where the river runs for 4.0 miles (6.4 km), passes under numerous bridges, and for a greater extent is channelized. At the bridge on the South Front Street it flows into the Arthur Kill.

== Elizabeth River Parkway ==
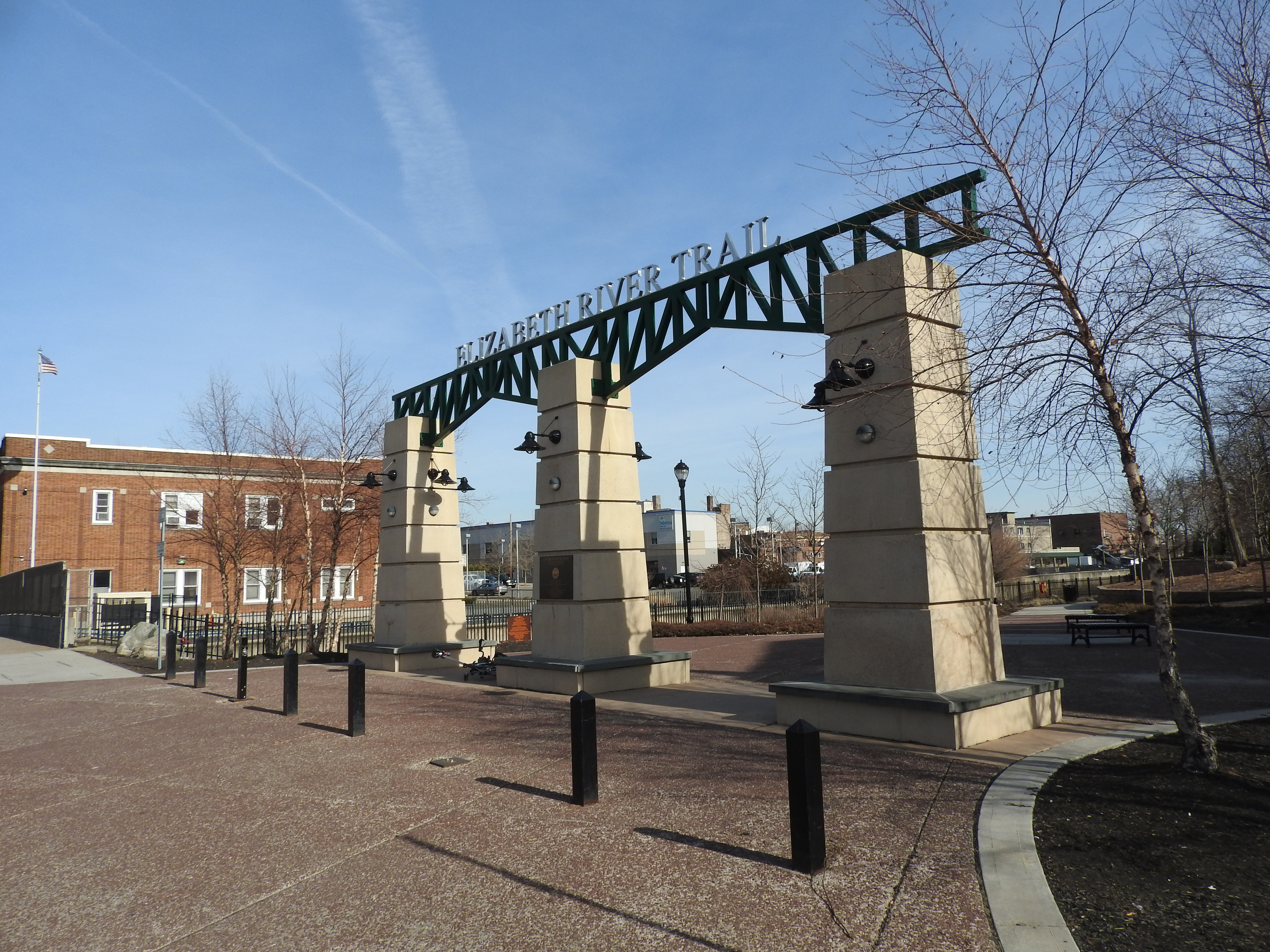
Broad Street entrance to Elizabeth River Trail

The Elizabeth River Parkway is a set of parklands that hugs the river from Hillside through Elizabeth It was designed in for the Union County Parks Commission in the 1920s by the historic firm Olmsted Brothers, and is one of the three "emerald necklaces" in the county park system, the others being Rahway River Parkway and Passaic River Parkway. The firm also designed Warinanco Park

== Elizabeth River Trail ==
The Elizabeth River Trail is a project to construct a park and riverside trail from South Broad Street in Downtown Elizabeth to the river's outlet into the Arthur Kill, a distance of 2 1/2 miles. Phase I, between Broad and Bridge streets near St. John's Parsonage, opened in 2012. Phase II was completed and opened in August 2018.

== Crossings ==
This list is for the crossings in Union County

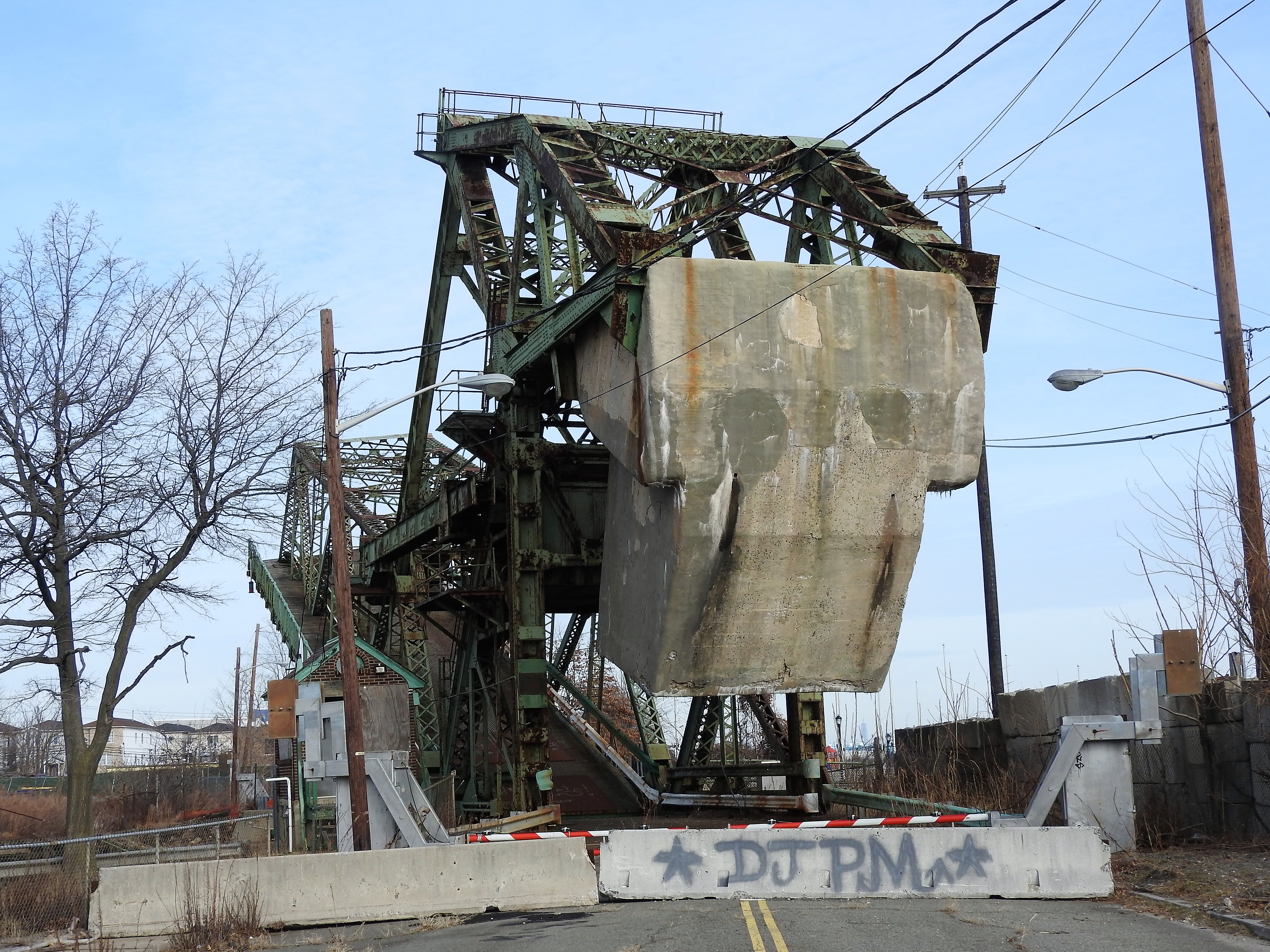
South Front Street Bridge

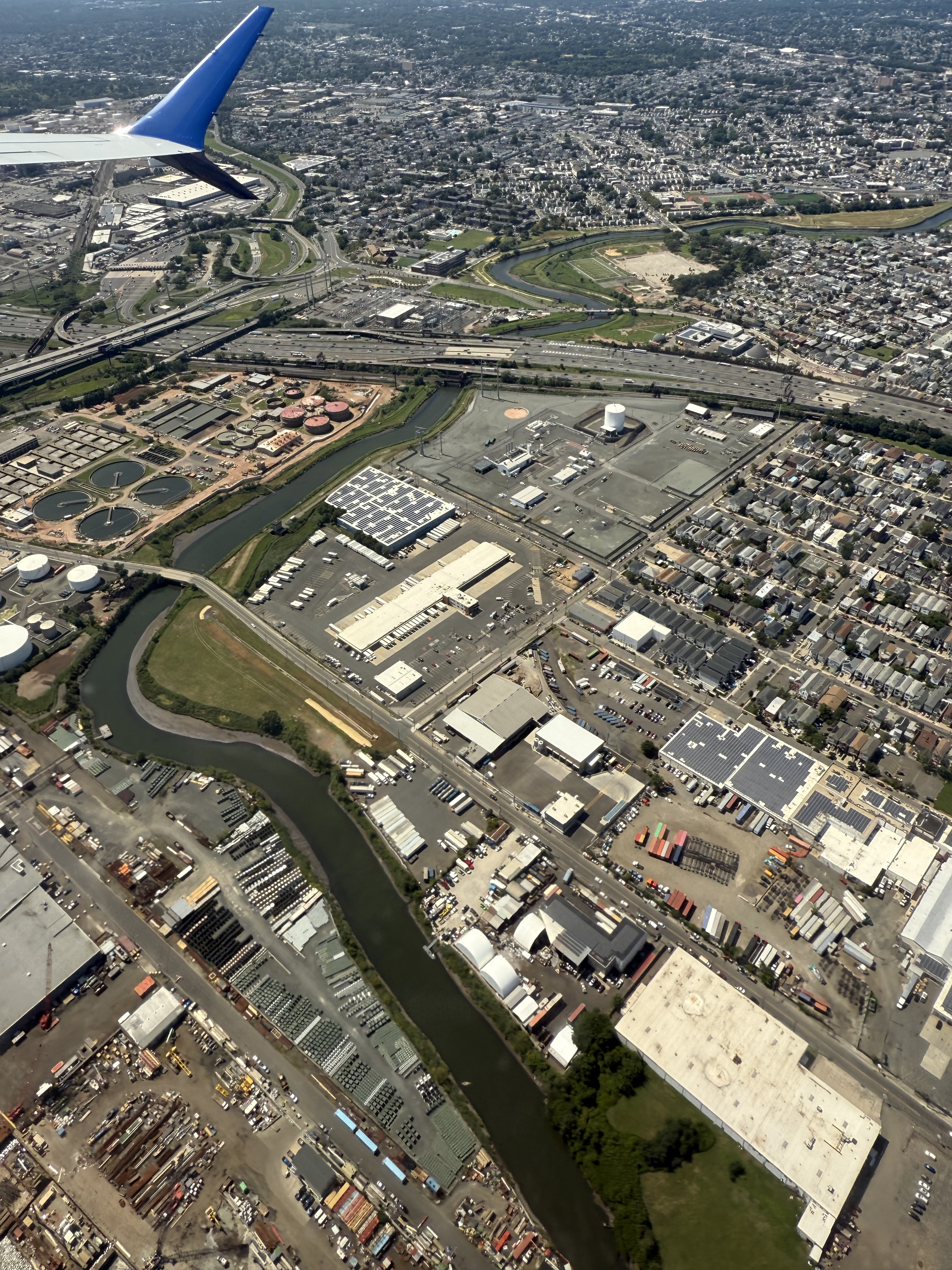
Elizabeth River near the New Jersey Turnpike

Mile Point	Crossing	Carries	Coordinates	References
0.0	South Front Street Bridge		40°38′40″N 74°11′27″W	
0.4	South First Street/Amboy Avenue		40°38′32″N 74°11′54″W	
0.7	Elizabeth River Bridge; Conrail (CRCX)	Perth Amboy and Elizabethport Railroad; Garden State Secondary	40°38′43″N 74°12′10″W	
0.9	New Jersey Turnpike	I-95 / N.J. Turnpike	40°38′44″N 74°12′13″W	Baltic Street eliminated in 1959
	Trenton Avenue/Atlantic Street		40°38′51″N 74°12′18″W	
1.7	South Fifth Street/Summer Street		40°39′00″N 74°12′35″W	
	Elizabeth River Viaduct	US 1-9	40°39′30″N 74°12′34″W	
	South Street		40°39′29″N 74°12′38″W	
2.1	Bridge Street		40°39′40″N 74°12′42″W	
	South Broad Street		40°39′40″N 74°12′55″W	
	Rahway Avenue		40°39′42″N 74°13′03″W	
	Elizabeth River Bridge	Northeast Corridor; Amtrak (Northeast Regional); New Jersey Transit; Northeast Corridor Line; North Jersey Coast Line	40°39′43″N 74°13′05″W	
	Murray Street		40°39′48″N 74°13′08″W	
	West Jersey Street		40°39′53″N 74°13′08″W	
	West Grand		40°39′59″N 74°13′07″W	
	Central Railroad of New Jersey ROW		40°40′01″N 74°13′07″W	
	Westfield Avenue	Route 27	40°40′05″N 74°13′10″W	
	Morris Avenue	CR 629	40°40′12″N 74°13′09″W	
	Orchard Street		40°40′16″N 74°13′10″W	
3.7	Trotters Lane		40°40′30″N 74°13′20″W	
3.8	Ursino Dam		40°40′31″N 74°13′21″W	
	North Avenue	Route 439	40°40′39″N 74°13′32″W	
	Kean University Footbridge		40°40′51″N 74°13′37″W	
	Conrail; New Jersey Transit	Lehigh Line; Raritan Valley Line	40°41′10″N 74°14′04″W	
	Liberty Avenue/Salem Road	CR 509	40°41′23″N 74°14′16″W	
	Salem Dam		40°41′24″N 74°14′16″W	
	U.S. Route 22	US 22	40°41′52″N 74°14′48″W	
	Garden State Parkway	G.S. Parkway	40°42′04″N 74°14′57″W	
	Phillipsburg-Newark Expressway	I-78	40°42′20″N 74°14′50″W	
	Union Avenue		40°42′26″N 74°14′49″W	
	Garden State Parkway Interchange 142	G.S. Parkway	40°42′34″N 74°14′46″W	
Elizabeth River becomes sub-surface waterway

This list is for the crossings in Essex County from Union County line to source

Crossing	Carries	Coordinates	References
Elizabeth River runs as sub-surface waterway under the Garden State Parkway
Mill Road			
Chancellor Avenue	CR 601		
Yale Avenue			
Lyons Avenue	CR 602	40.728822°N 74.233985°W	
Nye Avenue			
Springfield Avenue	CR 603		
Bridge at Civic Square			
Bridge at Civic Square			
Clinton Avenue	CR 605	40.728822°N 74.233985°W	
Madison Avenue			
Valley Street			

== See also ==
- List of rivers of New Jersey
- East Coast Greenway
- Geography of New York–New Jersey Harbor Estuary
