= South Front Street Bridge =

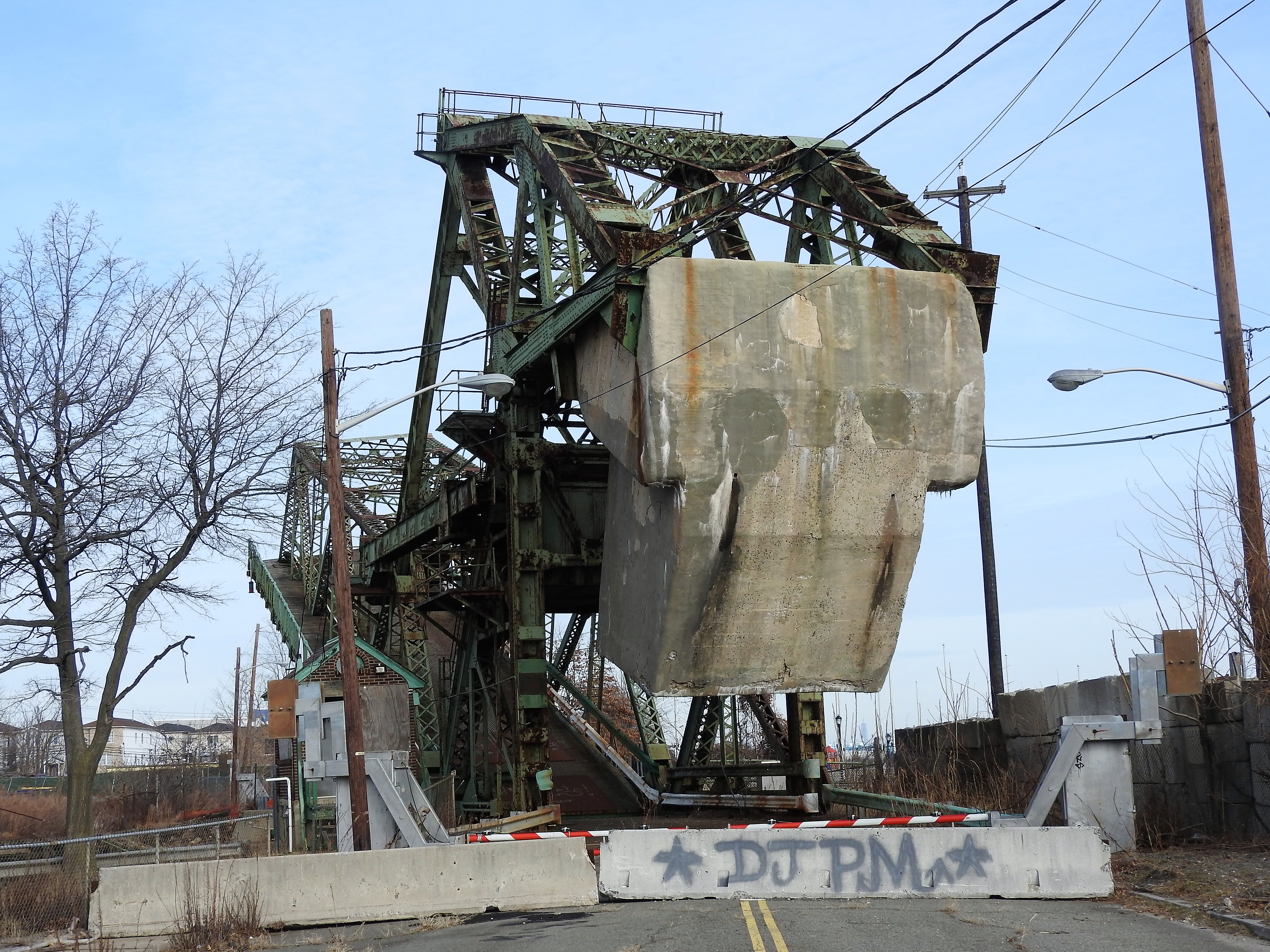
- Coordinates: 40°38′39″N 74°11′27″W
- Carries: South Front Street
- Crosses: Elizabeth River
- Locale: Elizabeth, New Jersey; Union County, New Jersey
- Owner: Union County

Characteristics
- Design: Warren Through Truss Single Leaf Strauss Heel-Trunnion Bascule
- Material: Steel
- Total length: 158.1 feet (48.2 m)
- Width: 17.7 feet (5.4 m)
- Longest span: 131.9 feet (40.2 m)
- Clearance above: 16.0 feet (4.9 m)16.0

History
- Engineering design by: Jacob L. Bauer
- Constructed by: Jacob L. Bauer (County Engineer)
- Fabrication by: Linde & Griffith
- Construction end: 1922; rehabilitated 1974
- Closed: 2011

South Front Street Bridge is vehicular bascule bridge over the Elizabeth River in Elizabeth, New Jersey, U.S. Located at river's mouth at the Arthur Kill, it is the first fixed crossing. Opened in 1923, it is the last surviving vehicular moveable bridge in Union County. The bridge is intact but has been out of operation since 2011 and closed to all traffic.

== Construction and design ==
The South Front Street Bridge is a Strauss trunnion bascule bridge along the designs of the Strauss Bascule Bridge Company, headed by Joseph Strauss. Construction began in 1920; it opened to traffic in 1922. It is a heel trunnion, which is a variation on the design, and is the only remaining road-carrying bridge of its type in New Jersey.

The bridge’s substructure and counterweight are made of concrete. A small brick bridge house, located adjacent to the bridge, house the controls. The machinery which operates the bridge is above the road; original gears and electric motors which were added in 1940. The bridge had a wooden roadway, which was replaced with a steel deck in 1956. The pedestrian walkway is wood, though not the original. The bridge underwent significant repairs in 1974-1976. The state historic preservation office has determined that the building is eligible for listing.

== Operations ==
Under normal conditions the bridge would be required to open for maritime traffic. South Front Street Bridge has been closed to road traffic since March 4, 2011, due to severe deterioration of the superstructure stringers and floor beams.

== See also ==
- List of crossings of the Elizabeth River
- Chemical Control Superfund Site
