= New Jersey Route 82 =

State highway in New Jersey, US

Route 82
- Morris Avenue; Jewish War Veterans Memorial Highway

Route information
- Maintained by NJDOT
- Length: 4.92 mi (7.92 km)
- Existed: January 1, 1953–present

Major junctions
- West end: Route 124 / CR 577 in Springfield Township
- G.S. Parkway / US 22 / CR 630 in Union Township
- East end: Route 439 / CR 629 in Union Township

Location
- Country: United States
- State: New Jersey
- Counties: Union

Highway system
- New Jersey State Highway Routes; Interstate; US; State; Scenic Byways
← Route 81	→ Route 83

Route 82 is a short state highway in Union County of the US state of New Jersey. It runs southeast from an intersection with Route 124 in Springfield Township along Morris Avenue to Route 439 in the Elizabeth general area. Along the 4.92 miles (7.92 km) route, it serves local businesses and the main arterial of Union Township. Near its eastern terminus at Route 439, Route 82 passes through Kean University, a state college in New Jersey. Route 82 originates as one of two Route S24 alignments designated in the 1927 state highway renumbering. A spur of Route 24, it lasted for 26 years untouched until the 1953 state highway renumbering, when Union County's Route S-24 was designated as Route 82 and a portion of Route 439. The route's alignment has changed little since the 1953 renumbering.

== Route description ==
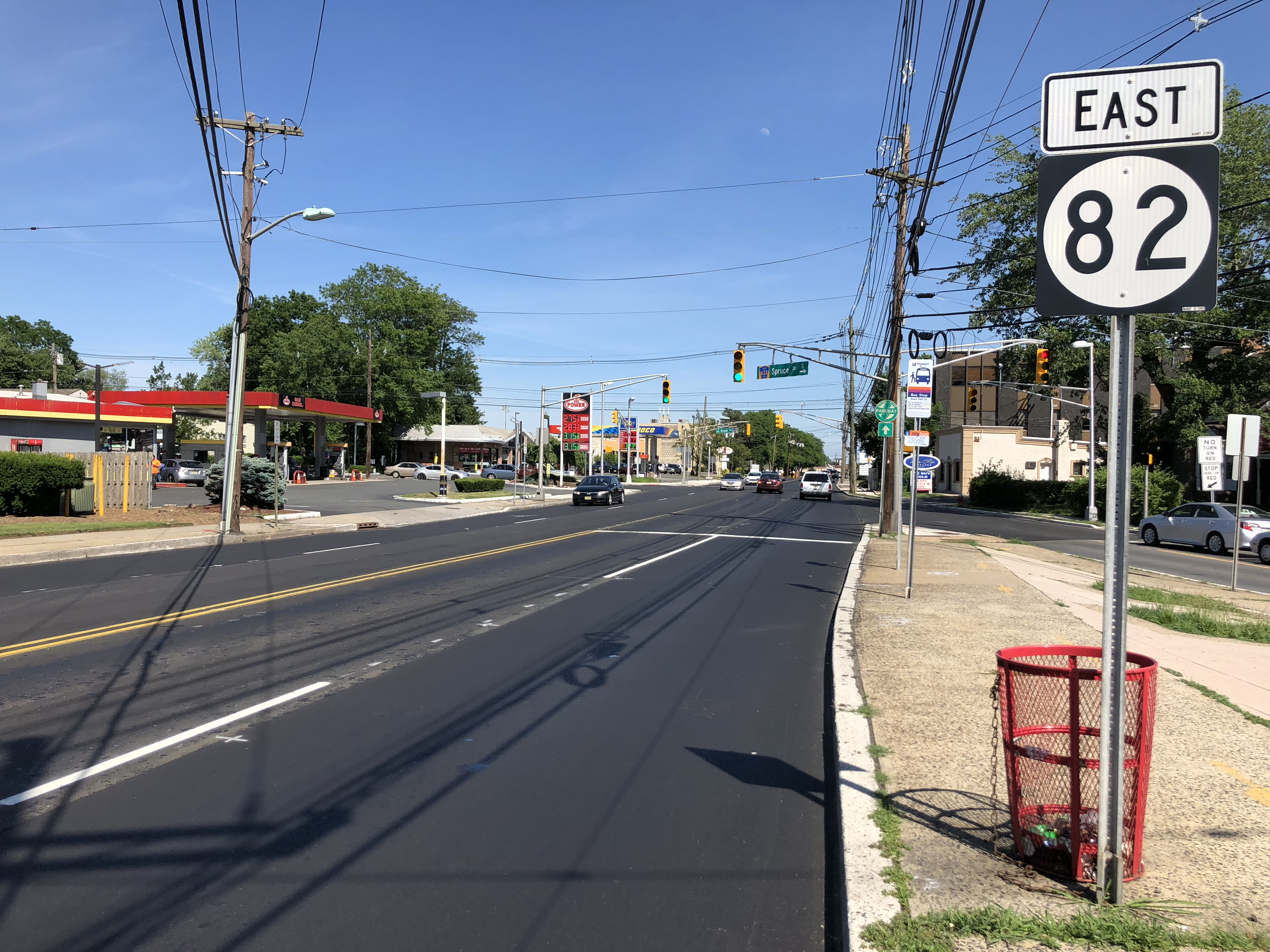
View east along Route 82 at Spruce Street and Burnet Avenue in Union Township

Route 82 begins at a traffic light complex with Route 124 eastbound and County Route 577 (CR 577) eastbound in the community of Springfield, New Jersey. The highway progresses eastward along Morris Avenue through a large business district. A short distance after, Route 82 intersects with Maple Street, which serves Route 124 westbound and the community of Maplewood. The route continues eastward along Morris Avenue, heading through the business district of Springfield. Residential homes begin to appear in the eastbound direction before the highway crosses over the Rahway River. From there, Route 82 enters Union, where it enters a large commercial district once again. During the highway's progression eastward, Route 82 enters more residential regions, intersecting with Liberty Avenue in the northern end of Union. Liberty Avenue connects Route 82 with U.S. Route 22 (US 22) in Union. The highway continues east along Morris Avenue, entering further into Union, where it serves as the main road to the community. At a fork with Elmwood Avenue, Route 82 diverts to the east along Morris, leaving the northern portion of Union.

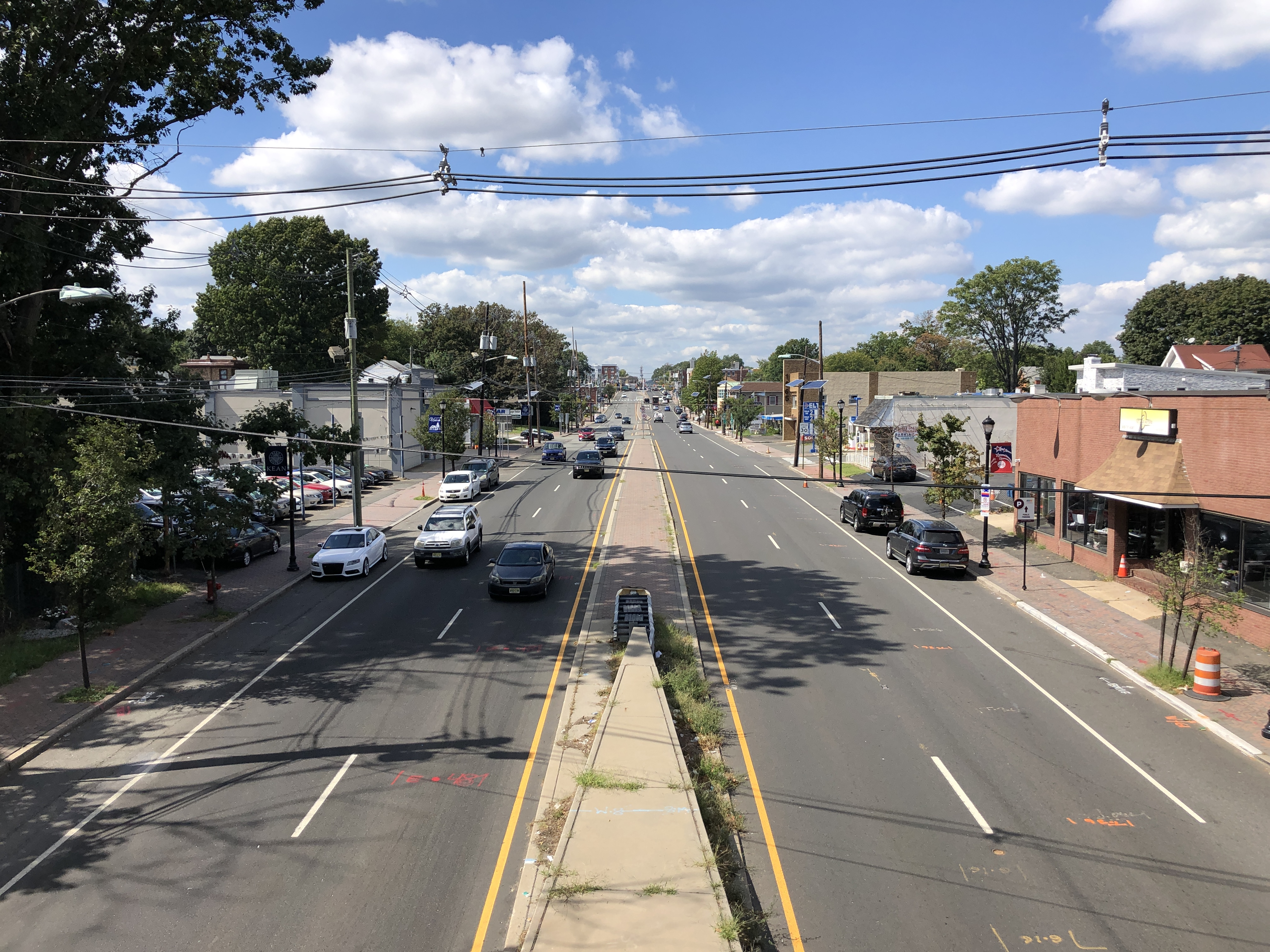
View westbound along Route 82 from US 22 in Union Township

Route 82 continues eastward as the main arterial, passing between many residential homes in both directions. The highway then enters the center of Union Township, where it intersects with CR 619 (Stuyvesant Avenue) and to the north of Friberger Park. Morris Avenue continues through a largely residential and commercial district in Union before crossing under the westbound lanes of US 22 and the eight lanes of the Garden State Parkway. Route 82 then passes under the eastbound lanes of US 22 before continuing along Morris Avenue into Union Township. A short distance later, the route approaches an intersection with a shopping mall access road before passing to the north of the local golf club, Suburban Golf. Route 82 and Morris Avenue continue eastward, passing through the middle of residential neighborhoods as a four-lane boulevard. A short distance after the golf club, the highway intersects CR 509 (Salem Avenue). From there, Route 82 becomes a divided arterial, passing to the south of Elizabeth River Park and crossing under Conrail Shared Assets Operations' Lehigh Line, which also carries NJ Transit's Raritan Valley Line. The nearby intersection for Green Lane serves the nearby Union station along the rail line. After the intersection with Green Lane, Route 82 enters the area of Kean University, which surrounds the highway in both directions. After intersecting with the university's access roads, Route 82 crosses through a wooded area before terminating at an intersection with Route 439 (North Avenue). Morris Avenue continues eastward as CR 629.

== History ==
Route S24
- Location: Springfield–Elizabeth
- Existed: 1927–1953

The alignment along Morris Avenue through Union and Springfield was originally the alignment of a Lenape trail running from Springfield to Elizabeth. It later became part of the Morris Turnpike, chartered in 1801 to run from Elizabeth to Newton. It became State Highway Route S-24, a prefixed spur of State Highway Route 24, in the 1927 state highway renumbering. This was one of two State Highway Route S-24s designated, with the other out in Warren County. Route S-24 in Union County was designated to run from Route 24 in Springfield (now Route 124) along Morris Avenue to an intersection with Route 25 in Elizabeth. (The alignment of Route 25 is now U.S. Routes 1 and 9.) At the intersection with current-day Route 439, Route S-24 turned off of current-day Route 82 and onto Route 439 southbound towards the Goethals Bridge across the Arthur Kill. Although the route remained intact for twenty-six years, the 1953 state highway renumbering occurred on January 1, and Route S-24 was re-designated as Route 82 and Route 439, while Route 24 through Springfield remained the same. The route's general alignment has remained virtually unchanged since the 1953 renumbering, with the highway remaining on Morris Avenue. In 2005, the New Jersey Department of Transportation was given US$800,000 in an earmark to give Route 82 roadway and intersection improvements.

== Major intersections ==
The entire route is in Union County.

Location	mi	km	Destinations	Notes
Springfield Township	0.00	0.00	Route 124 (Springfield Avenue) / CR 577 north (Main Street)	Western terminus; southern terminus of CR 577
Union Township	2.64– 2.68	4.25– 4.31	G.S. Parkway / US 22 / CR 630 to N.J. Turnpike (I-95 Toll) – Newark, New York	Interchange; no eastbound exit; CR 630 not signed; exits 140A-B on G.S. Parkway
Union Township	3.83	6.16	CR 509 (Salem Road) – Hillside, Roselle Park	
Union Township	4.92	7.92	Route 439 (North Avenue) / CR 629 east (Morris Avenue) – Staten Island, Newark	Eastern terminus; western terminus of CR 629
1.000 mi = 1.609 km; 1.000 km = 0.621 mi
