= St. John's Parsonage =

Historic house in New Jersey, United States

- U.S. National Register of Historic Places
- New Jersey Register of Historic Places
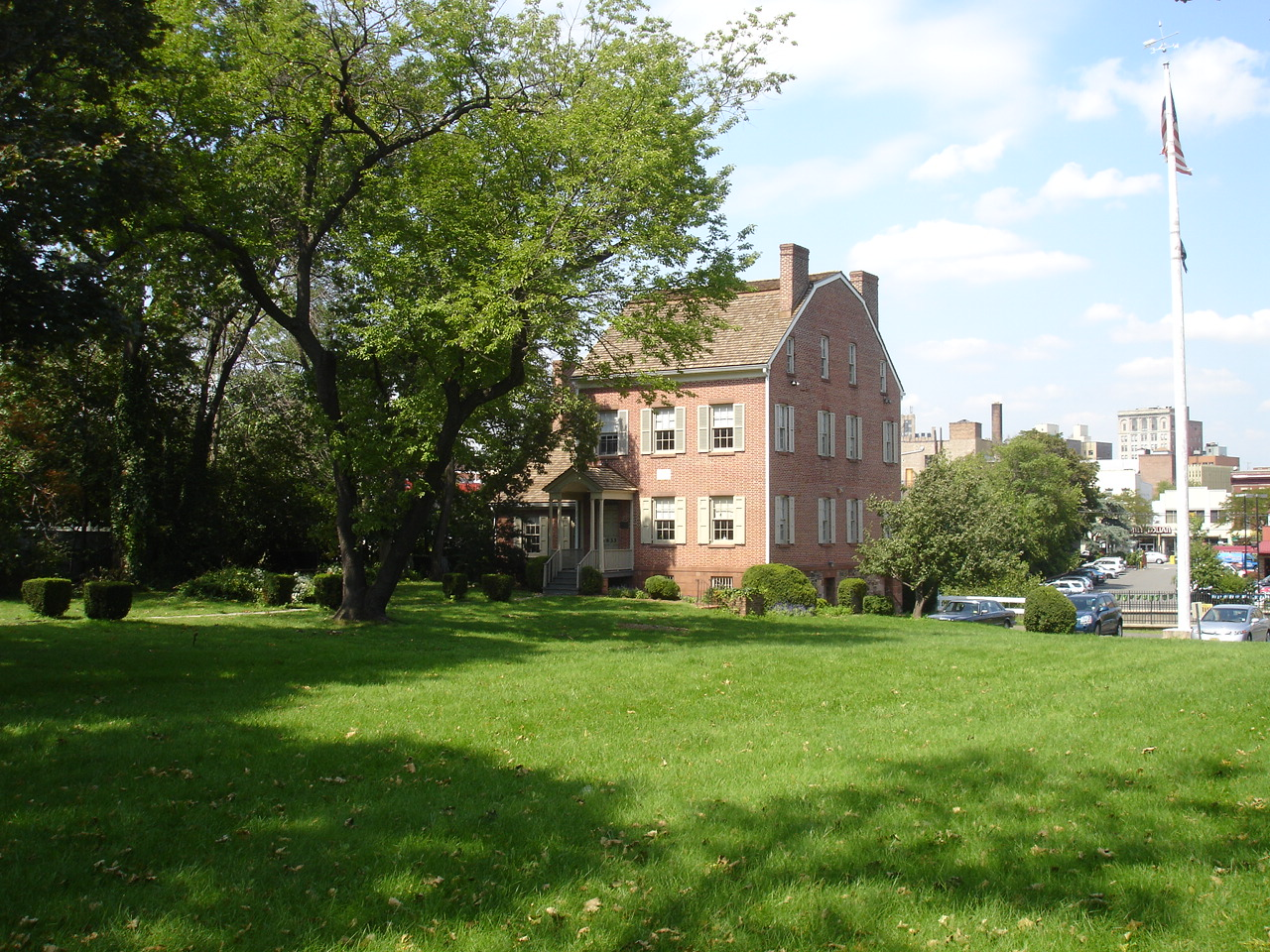

- Location within Union County, New Jersey Location within New Jersey Location within the United States
- Location: 633 Pearl Street, Elizabeth, New Jersey
- Coordinates: 40°39′37″N 74°12′45″W
- Built: 1696
- Architectural style: Federal
- NRHP reference No.: 82003306
- NJRHP No.: 2669

Significant dates
- Added to NRHP: September 16, 1982
- Designated NJRHP: April 30, 1982

St. John's Parsonage, also known as the Andrew Hampton Homestead, is a historic house located at 633 Pearl Street in the city of Elizabeth in Union County, New Jersey, United States. It was added to the National Register of Historic Places on September 16, 1982, for its significance in architecture and religion.

It served as the parsonage and school for St. John's Church from 1749 to about 1885, after which it was used by the parish for "charitable purposes" until 1902. It was thereafter sold and used as a boarding house until purchased by the Elizabethtown Historical Society in 1960 and renovated.

A stone plaque on the facade between the first and second stories states it was built 1696 and rebuilt 1817. The red brick Federal style structure dates to at least 1749, and was restored in 1960 to its 1818 appearance. One wing is believed to be date to a 1696 structure. The floor plan and silhouette are typical of New Jersey homes of the late 18th and early 19th centuries.

== See also ==
- Elizabeth River (New Jersey)
- List of the oldest buildings in New Jersey
- National Register of Historic Places listings in Union County, New Jersey
