= Chemical Control Superfund Site =

Coordinates: 40.6445°N 74.1907°W

The Chemical Control Corporation superfund site is located at 22 South Front St. Elizabeth, New Jersey. Once a marsh, the 2-acre (0.81 ha) area next to the Elizabeth River is primarily flat land slightly above sea-level. The company, Chemical Control Corporation, worked as a hazardous waste disposal plant from 1970 until its condemnation in 1979. Before the April 21, 1980 fire, it was reported that over 50,000 drums of chemicals, including dioxins, benzene, cyanide, toluene, ethylene dichloride, and more, were present on the site. State intervention was taken prior to the fire, but it became a matter of national intervention following the fire due to the level of contamination that impacted the environment and community. Cleanup operations have been underway since the early 1980s. The Environmental Protection Agency is considering removing the site from the National Priorities List because of the extensive cleanup that has been done.

== Origins ==
The Chemical Control Corporation superfund site is located in a highly industrial district of Elizabeth, New Jersey. The Elizabeth River, which runs from several counties in New Jersey, empties itself right in front of the site. The company was operated from 1972-1979 under several owners including William Carracino, Eugene Conlon, John Albert and William Colleton. The buildup of chemical wastes began after failure to fix the incinerator. Under the ownership of Colleton, the site reached over 50,000 chemical drums, resulting in Chemical Control being condemned in 1979 as a superfund site.

=== Town history ===
The city of Elizabeth is located in New Jersey. It is the largest city in Union County and also holds the largest county seat. Based on the 2010 census, Elizabeth is also the fourth largest city in New Jersey. It is composed of several districts and neighborhoods including Midtown, Bayway, Downtown or the Port of Elizabeth, West End, Elmora Hills, Frog Hollow, North End, Keighry Head, Peterstown, The Point, Quality Hill and Westminster. It is bordered by the towns of Roselle, Roselle Park, Union, Hillside, Newark and Linden, which is the site of the LCP Chemical, Inc. superfund site. The Elizabeth River, which runs through both Union and Essex County, empties "underneath a bridge on the S Front Street near Elizabeth Ave and S 1st St." South Front Street is the location of the Chemical Control Corporation superfund site which had contaminated the Elizabeth River.

=== Company history ===
The Chemical Control superfund site was operated and run by the Chemical Control Corporation. It received a five-year operating permit in 1972 for its incinerator that passed the air quality tests. Between 1976 and 1977, the owner and operator of Chemical Control was William Carracino. During this period of time, he arranged for midnight dumping throughout Elizabeth to "offset the buildup of inventory at the site". He was indicted and convicted of this crime and was sentenced to "two consecutive three year terms and fined a sum of $21,000." However, Carracino sold the company to Eugene Conlon and John Albert, who were allegedly linked to a well-known mob under the Genovese family. The two appointed William Colleton as the new president. During this time, 30,000 drums of chemicals were recorded on site and Colleton was ordered to get rid of them in a safe manner. On one occasion a company run by John Albert, Sampson Tank Cleaning, was paid "$48,000 by Jersey City to remove some eight hundred drums of chemicals abandoned on the city’s pier. Although the city paid for the drums to be disposed of properly, they were later found stockpiled at the Chemical Control Company." It's unclear if these drums abandoned on the city pier were left there by Mafia controlled companies, but they had a history of doing things like that. There was some concern that CCC might attempt to cut costs and collect insurance by creating a deliberate fire. He had refused to dispose of them safely and by 1979 over 50,000 drums of chemicals were recorded to be on site. This led to the condemnation of the Chemical Control site in 1979, removing any incentive for a deliberate fire, at least from CCC.

== Superfund designation ==
State and national intervention were enforced on the Chemical Control superfund site. The state of New Jersey initiated cleanup efforts through Peabody Coastal Services and from funding by the New Jersey Spill Compensation Fund after the site was condemned in 1979. Whether or not Coastal Services was also controlled by the Mafia they didn't clean it up and actually took in more barrels against court orders. "Whether or not the fire was deliberately set, it seems reasonable to conclude with David Weinberg that it 'couldn’t have happened without a State Department of Environmental Protection that was unwilling or unable to use the law to regulate the Chemical Control Corporation.' ..... Coastal Services said it removed 8,200 drums and billed the state for $1.9 million. On the other hand, the DEP concluded there were 60,000 drums on the property the night of the fire, some 26,000 more than when Coastal began its alleged clean-up.” The 1980 fire at Chemical Control resulted in national intervention as a result of the magnitude of contamination that effected both the state of New Jersey and New York via the air, soil, and water.

=== State intervention ===
Prior to the Environmental Protection Agency intervention, the state of New Jersey initiated a cleanup of the site in 1979 when the company was taken over by Conlon and Albert. The state stated that the new owners of the site had to "eliminate the barrels that had built up on the site at a rate of 1,200 per month, to inventory and label all on-site drums, and to incinerate all burnable waste." However, the state administrator who mandated the requirements did not state that the site was barred from accepting more chemicals. This resulted in an increase of 30,000 drums of chemicals to 50,000 drums of chemicals on site by 1979. As a result, an investigation by the Bureau of Hazardous Waste's was started which, "led to the suit filed against Chemical Control and its parent company, the Northern Pollution Control Company of New York. The owners of Chemical Control, Conlon and Albert, claimed that their company did not have sufficient funds to perform a cleanup. The Chemical Control records at the time showed only a few thousand dollars, so the state put the company in receivership." After being condemned in 1979, Peabody Coastal Services was hired to commence the cleanup of the site. Between 1979 and the fire of 1980, 8,000 to 10,000 drums of toxic and explosive chemicals were removed, along with "5 pounds of radioactive substances, 10 pounds of disease-bearing material, and nearly 400 pounds of explosive material." The whole operation costed between $11–13 million and was all funded by the New Jersey Spill Compensation Fund.

=== National intervention ===
At first, national intervention was not necessarily due to the intense state efforts to clean up the site. However, "on April 21, 1980, an explosive fire at the Chemical Control Corporation's Elizabeth, New Jersey hazardous waste treatment facility sent a toxic mixture of gases and chemical particulates into the atmosphere. Fifty-five gallon drums containing a variety of chemicals rocketed two hundred feet in the air before they burst due to the intense heat. Temperatures reached 3,000°F., melting and fusing containers. An estimated 50,000 drums of hazardous waste burned for more than ten hours before the Elizabeth fire department was able to bring the fire under control at 9:15 a.m. During the fire, a plume of noxious smoke and ash blanketed a fifteen square-mile area northeast from the site." The fire not only caused chemicals to become airborne, but also resulted in them entering water, groundwater and soil. Contamination of the environment and health risks of over 15 million people led the Environmental Protection Agency to intervene at the site. The site was proposed for admission to be put on the National Priorities List in October 1981 and was finally added in September 1983. The origin of the fire "has never been determined, although unstable chemicals are the prime suspect"

== Health and environmental hazards ==
The damages caused by the Chemical Control Corporation superfund site effected both the surrounding environment and community of Elizabeth, New Jersey. The chemicals before the fire effected groundwater, soil and the nearby water way of the Elizabeth River. During the 1980 fire, chemicals became airborne and spread to neighboring towns and states. Numerous chemicals from the site, including benzene, PCBs, toluene and more, resulted in side effects of irritated eyes, vomiting, diarrhea and skin rashes. The long term effects from the exposure of the chemicals can be seen in firefighters who have developed lung diseases, cancer, blood disorders, and nerve damage.

=== Chemicals involved ===
As a result of both leaking drums of chemicals and the 1980 fire, the contamination of soil, surface water, ground water and air reached dangerous levels. Prior to the fire, the noted chemicals that were removed from the site included benzene, cyanide, military nerve gas, PCBs, dioxins and nitroglycerine. One of the more toxic chemicals that was reported on site was dioxin, which "in its pure form, three ounces of dioxin in New York's water supply could kill everyone in the city". Carracino admitted that there was one thousand 55-gallon drums of dioxin at the Chemical Control site. During the fire, the chemicals known to be onsite included "insecticides, mercury compounds, nitric and picric acids, benzene, toulene, solvents, plasticizers, alcohol, and ethylene dichloride." The solvents on site including benzene and ethylene dichloride can cause sudden death, blindness, damage to kidneys, liver and lung damage, irregular heartbeat, and skin rashes. High mercury compound exposure can cause mercury poisoning leading to death or permanently damaged kidneys and brain. The exposure of insecticides can cause certain types of cancers, birth defects, irritation of eyes and skin and hormonal imbalance. Some of these side effects have been reported from firefighters and bystanders of the nearby communities. The chemicals that resulted in contamination were detected in different areas of the environment. The chemicals found in groundwater included hexachlorocyclopentadiene, PCBs, and toluene. Contaminates found in the air included benzene, PCBs, toluene, and xylene. The subsurface soil was analyzed and it was discovered that the chemicals of "VOCs, phthalate esters, PCBs, and polynuclear aromatic hydrocarbons [were found] at depths of approximately 3 to 10 feet". However, the amount of each chemical present on site is unknown

=== Contamination of Elizabeth River ===
Due to the 1980 fire and midnight dumpings by Carracino, the surface water of the Elizabeth River, which was in close proximity, had been contaminated by several chemicals. These chemicals included benzene, PCBs, toluene, trichloroethylene, and Tri halogenated methane. This also led to the contamination of marine life in the river including, crabs, shellfish and fish. This raised awareness of the human health threats as a result of ingesting chemicals via marine life.

=== Health threats ===
The 1980 fire resulted in a widespread contamination of chemicals. On average, 15 million people were affected by the huge cloud of smoke and contaminates that arose and spread from both the surrounding towns of Elizabeth, New Jersey and also New York City. Those impacted the most were firefighters and residents in close proximity of the fire. It was reported that as a result of the fire, some of the chemicals were neutralized from the intense heat. In a book published by Lewis Regenstein, he reports that "on the other hand, many firefighters, bystanders, and residents as far away as Staten Island required treatment for irritated throats, eyes, lips, and skin. Some also suffered temporary loss of appetite, vomiting, diarrhea, and eye strain. Fire fighters and waste disposal workers were reported to be still suffering from dizziness and diarrhea six months after the fire." In an article published in the Star Ledger, it was reported that ten years after the fire, "about 20 members of the fire department who were involved with battling the blaze, now suffer from cancer or other illnesses, including lung disease, blood disorders and nerve damage." Firefighter Mularz, who was one of the men on duty during the blaze, reports that due to his own exposure, he was diagnosed with "permanent lung damage, mental problems and an incurable blood disorder". Many of those affected by the fire who suffered from health problems are currently in lawsuits to seek out compensation

== Clean up ==
A three-stage cleanup plan for the Chemical Control superfund site was initiated by the Environmental Protection Agency. It included two long-term remedial plans and one immediate action plan. After cleanup, the Environmental Protection Agency is considering removing the Chemical Control superfund site from the National Priorities List.

=== Initial clean up ===
After the 1980 fire, national intervention from the Environmental Protection Agency fueled cleanup efforts. A remedial plan was approved by William N. Hedeman Jr., the Director of the Office of Emergency and Remedial Response, in order to determine the extensive cleanup measures that needed to be taken. The research and analysis phase alone cost $785,500 and was completed in 12 months. The cleanup for the site was addressed in three stages, the first being an immediate action plan by the Environmental Protection Agency, followed by two long-term remedial phases. The immediate action by the EPA started in the early 1980s and included "removing and decontaminating 11 box trailers and one vacuum truck; clearing plugged storm sewers; sampling and removing 187 gas cylinders left at the site and one taken from the Elizabeth River; conducting a limited site investigation and a focused evaluation of the alternatives for cleanup to confirm reports that drums from the site had entered the river; and removing all containers found next to the site." Following the immediate action of the Environmental Protection Agency, long term actions were initiated which included:

"(1) combining contaminated soil with a solidification agent so that the contaminants cannot migrate from the site; (2) removal of debris from earlier cleanup actions, including water collected during monitoring well installation, items recovered from the Elizabeth River under the initial cleanup action, used disposable equipment, and the decontamination pad; (3) sealing the sanitary sewer line under the site where it connects to the South Front Street storm sewer; (4) repairing the berm that separates the site from the Elizabeth River; and (5) collecting and analyzing environmental samples to ensure the effectiveness of the remedy, including a periodic evaluation to assess protectiveness of human health and the environment." All three plans were completed.

=== Current status ===
The Chemical Control site is now "an empty lot of approximately 2 acres covered by crushed stone and secured by a chain link fence". A most recent five-year review was completed on September 12, 2014 and the Environmental Protection Agency is considering removing the Chemical Control Corporation Superfund site from the National Priorities List However, the site has not been approved for reuse or redevelopment. As of 2019, the site was being used for storage purposes.
