= New Jersey Route 439 =

State highway in New Jersey, US

Route 439

Route information
- Maintained by NJDOT
- Length: 3.95 mi (6.36 km)
- Existed: January 1, 1953–present

Major junctions
- South end: I-95 Toll / N.J. Turnpike / I-278 in Elizabeth
- US 1-9 in Elizabeth
- North end: Route 27 in Elizabeth

Location
- Country: United States
- State: New Jersey
- Counties: Union

Highway system
- New Jersey State Highway Routes; Interstate; US; State; Scenic Byways
← Route 413	→ Route 440

Route 439 is a short state highway in the communities of Elizabeth, Union and Hillside in Union County, New Jersey. The highway is known as the Bayway, North Avenue and Elmora Avenue from the Goethals Bridge and Interstate 278 (I-278) and does a half-loop around Elizabeth, with the designation terminating at an intersection with Route 27 in Elizabeth. The highway originated as part of Route 28 south of the current intersection with Route 28 and Route S24 (which made up several routes) north of that intersection to Route 82. The current designation of Route 439 was assigned in the 1953 renumbering.

== Route description ==
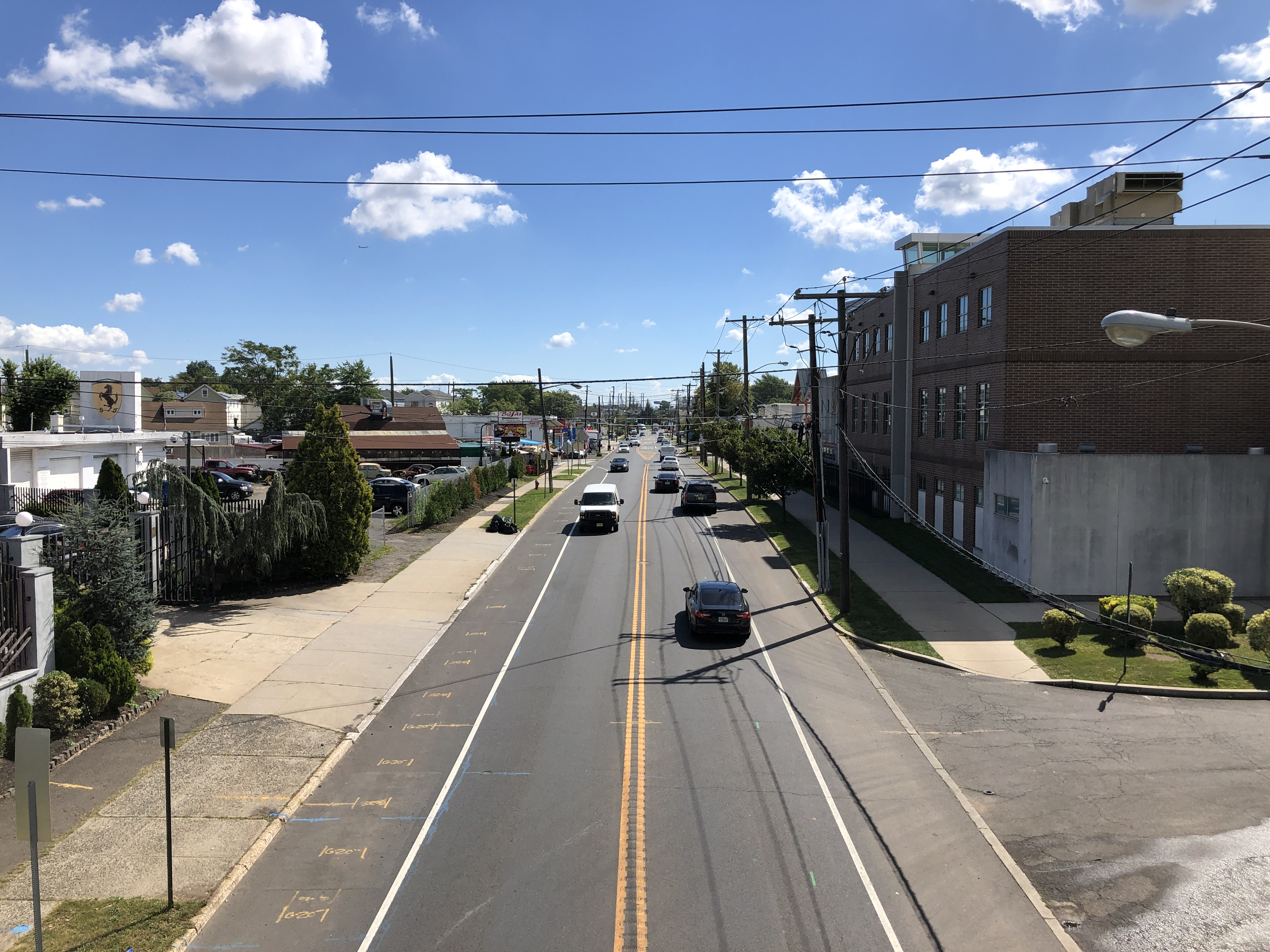
View southbound along Route 439 at the Northeast Corridor in Elizabeth

Route 439 begins at an intersection with Union County Route 616 (CR 616) and I-278 near the Goethals Bridge in Elizabeth. The highway progresses westward, passing to the south of the Number 22 Elementary School. The surroundings of the highway are densely populated, with buildings surrounding the highway the entire time. Turning to the northeast, Route 439 intersects with the southern terminus of CR 623 (South Broad Street) and enters the small community of Bayway, for which the highway is named. There, the route intersects with U.S. Routes 1 & 9 (US 1/9) at Bayway Circle, where it changes monikers to South Elmora Avenue and continues deeper into Elizabeth.

After the Bayway Circle, Route 439 continues to the northeast and into Elizabeth, where it intersects with CR 514 (Lidgerwood Avenue) and crosses the New Jersey Transit railroad line nearby. The highway then intersects Fay Avenue. The development around the road becomes more residential for a short time along Route 439, until the first intersection with Route 27 (Rahway Avenue), where the commercial development experienced earlier returns. After Route 27, the route's loop begins to turn even further northward, where it enters Elmora. The highway passes to the southwest of Carteret Park and soon leaves Elmora.

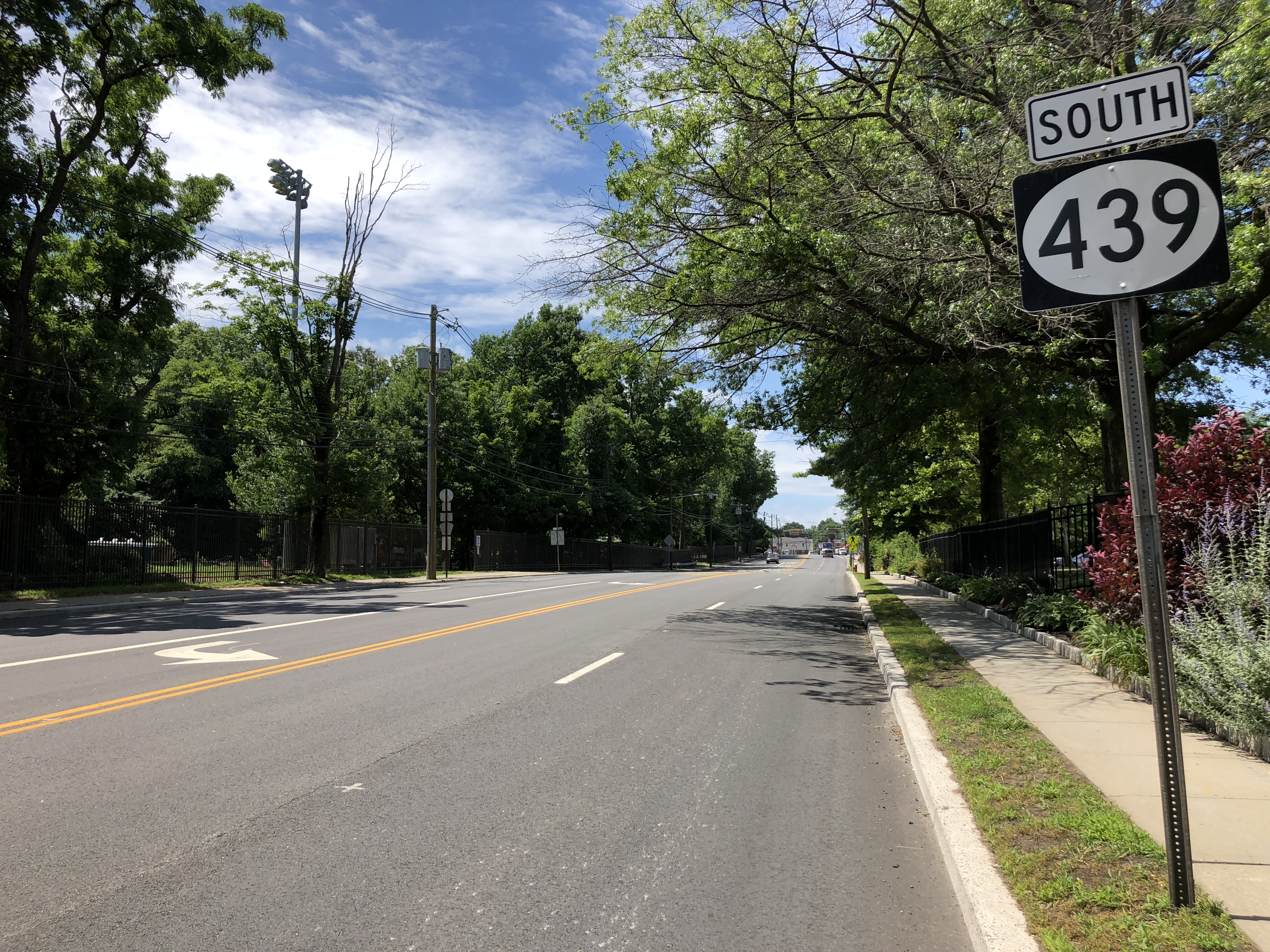
Route 439 southbound after Route 82 in Elizabeth

North of Elmora, Route 439 intersects with CR 610 (West Gand Street) and Route 28 (Westfield Avenue), both of which parallel each other for several miles. After the intersection with Route 28, the highway begins the turn to the east once again. At an intersection with Chilton Street, the highway changes monikers to North Avenue, which it retains for the remaining length. During the curve, Route 439 enters Union and intersects with the southern terminus of Route 82, where Kean University and Phil Rizzuto Park both surround the highway. After Route 82, the highway enters Hillside and begins the eastward progression, passing to the south of Elizabeth River Park. After the curve completes, Route 439 enters Elizabeth again and intersects with County Route 623 once again and continues a short distance, where it terminates at the second intersection with Route 27. North Avenue continues eastward to an interchange with Route 81.

== History ==
Route 439 originates as an alignment of New Jersey State Highway Route 28, assigned in the 1927 New Jersey state highway renumbering from Route 28 to the intersection with US 1/9. The highway was set to serve a new Staten Island crossing, which finally opened on June 29, 1928. The highway that ran north of Route 28 and progressed north to the current intersection with Route 82 was New Jersey State Highway Route S-24, which a spur of Route 24 from Phillipsburg to Elizabeth. The designations remained intact for over two decades, but across the Arthur Kill in Staten Island, New York State Route 439 (NY 439) was assigned onto the Goethals Bridge, and when the 1953 New Jersey state highway renumbering occurred on January 1, 1953, the highway was redesignated as Route 439 to match up at the state line.

Part of the NJ alignment and New York alignment was decommissioned in 1968 as a part do the modernization of the New Jersey Turnpike and Goethals Bridge approach span in conjuration with construction of I-278, this also eliminated the former direct Interchange between the two highways in favor of using the I-278 Interchange to do so.

== Major intersections ==
The entire route is in Union County.

Location	mi	km	Destinations	Notes
Elizabeth	0.00	0.00	I-95 Toll / N.J. Turnpike / I-278 east (Goethals Bridge)	Southern terminus; exit 13 on I-95 / Turnpike; exit 3B on I-278
Elizabeth	0.68	1.09	US 1-9 – Newark Airport	Roundabout
Elizabeth	0.87	1.40	CR 514 (Lidgerwood Avenue)	
Elizabeth	1.30	2.09	Route 27 (Rahway Avenue)	
Elizabeth	2.00	3.22	Route 28 – Roselle Park, Somerville	
Union Township	2.83	4.55	Route 82 west / CR 629 east (Morris Avenue) – Union, Elizabeth	Eastern terminus of Route 82; western terminus of CR 629
Elizabeth	3.95	6.36	Route 27 (Newark Avenue)	Northern terminus
1.000 mi = 1.609 km; 1.000 km = 0.621 mi
