= Dowd Avenue (Elizabeth, New Jersey) =

Street in Elizabeth, New Jersey

- Maintained by: City of Elizabeth
- Length: 1.05 mi (1.69 km)
- Location: Elizabeth; Union County
- West end: Trumbull Street in Elizabeth
- East end: Route 81 in Elizabeth

Dowd Avenue is a major thoroughfare in Elizabeth, New Jersey which serves the residential district. The street is 1.05 miles (1.69 km) long, beginning at an intersection with Trumbull Street in Elizabeth, continuing on a west–east alignment to New Jersey Route 81. The street was formerly known as Humboldt Avenue by the city of Elizabeth and formerly maintained by the New Jersey State Highway Department (now the New Jersey Department of Transportation) as an alignment of Route 164.

Route 164 was first assigned onto Humboldt Avenue after the 1953 state highway renumbering, continuing until somewhere between 1957 and 1969, when it was decommissioned and turned over to the city for maintenance. Later on, Humboldt Avenue was changed names to Dowd Avenue, and the alignment was used as a frontage road to the recently constructed Route 81 Expressway.

== Route description ==
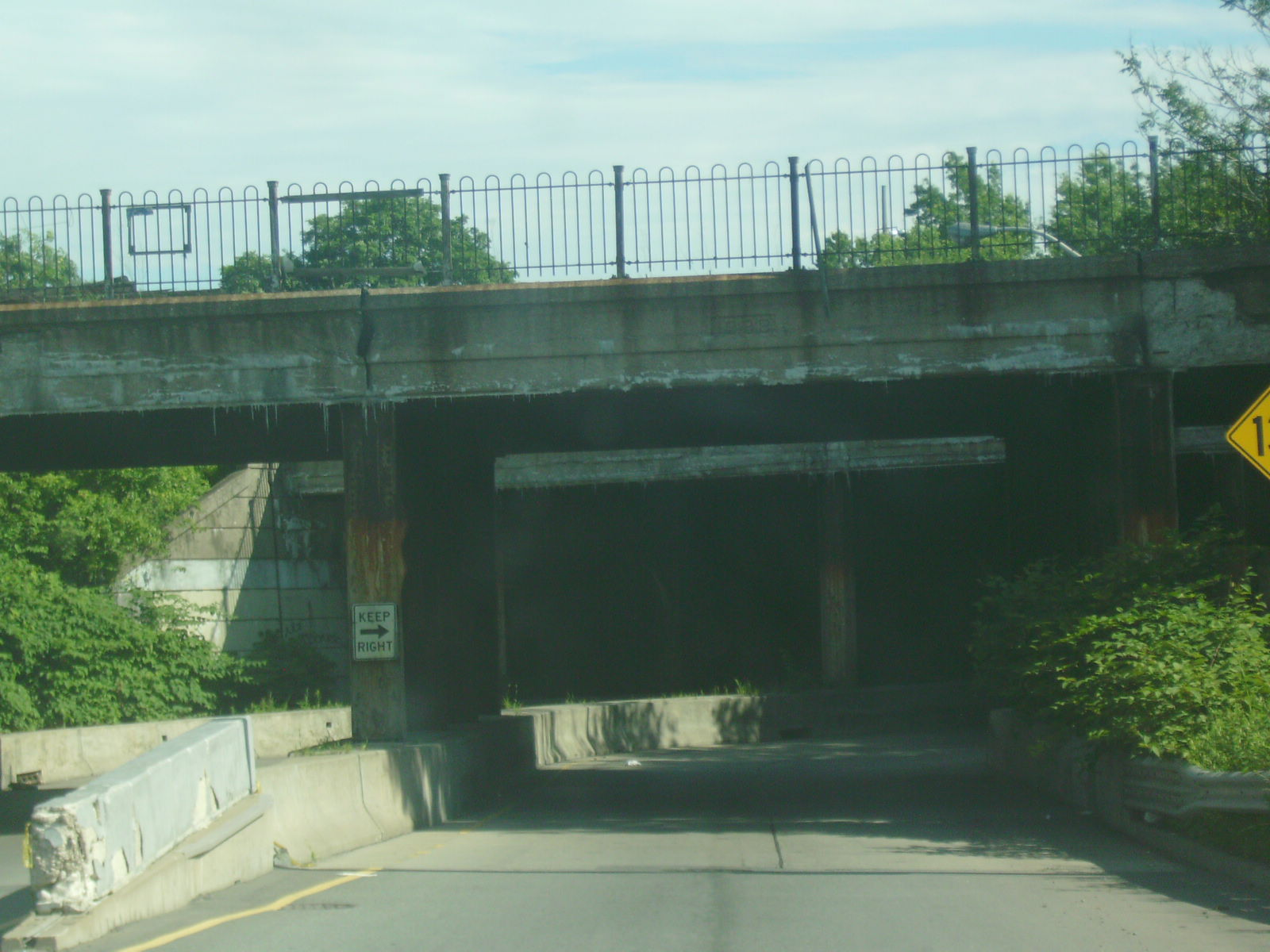
Dowd Avenue heading under a state-maintained bridge in Elizabeth

Dowd Avenue begins at an intersection with Trumbull Street and New Point Road in the city of Elizabeth, New Jersey. The street heads northward, crossing between two railroad lines and passing under two overpasses serving former rail lines. Paralleling to the east of the New Jersey Turnpike, Dowd Avenue crosses under another railroad, the route enters a short community in the southeastern portion of Elizabeth. The highway then continues northward, intersecting with Schiller Street, which serves as the main street. After leaving the community, Dowd Avenue turns to the northwest, crossing under the twelve lanes of the turnpike just south of Interchange 13A and continuing northward on a western parallel. From here, Dowd Avenue continues northward along the turnpike right-of-way, passing through a large industrial community, serving several industries (including Wakefern Food Corporation). A two-lane roadway, Dowd Avenue intersects with Evans Street, which dead-ends soon after. Entering the center of Elizabeth and along a parallel with Route 81, Dowd Avenue continues northward until reaching North Avenue, which serves as the northern terminus of Dowd combined with the Route 81 interchange. Dowd Avenue's right-of-way merges into Route 81.

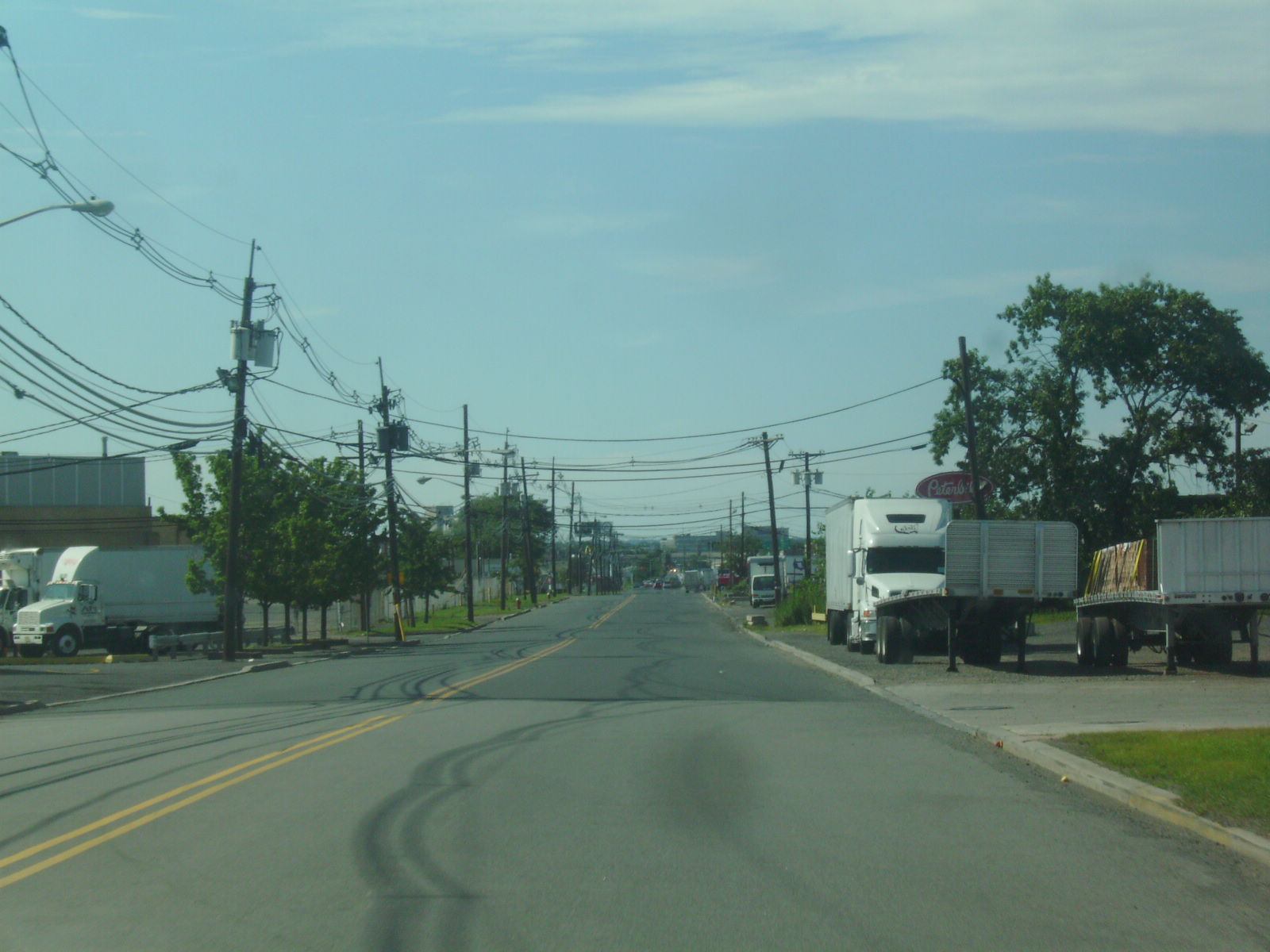
Dowd Avenue heading southbound through Elizabeth's industrial district

== History ==
The alignment of Dowd Avenue originates as the name of Humboldt Avenue and the designation of New Jersey Route 164. Route 164 was first designated just after the 1953 state highway renumbering, as the highway was not listed as a creation of the renumbering from its original system. Although the maps produced by Rand McNally never showed Route 164 after 1955, the highway was in logs produced by the state of New Jersey past 1957. Route 164 was decommissioned by the New Jersey State Highway Department by the 1969 milepost log. In 1982, the new freeway to Newark Airport (New Jersey Route 81), which parallels the former alignment of Route 164, opened.

== Major intersections ==
The entire route is in Elizabeth, Union County.

mi	km	Destinations	Notes
0.00	0.00	Trumbull Street	Southern terminus
1.05	1.69	To N.J. Turnpike (I-95)	Access via North Avenue
1.05	1.69	Route 81 north to US 1-9 – Trenton, Newark Airport	Northern terminus
1.000 mi = 1.609 km; 1.000 km = 0.621 mi

== See also ==
Browse numbered routes
← Route 163	Route 164	→ Route 165
