= New Jersey Route 81 =

State highway in Union County, New Jersey, US

Route 81

Route information
- Maintained by NJDOT and NJTA
- Length: 1.18 mi (1.90 km)
- Existed: 1982–present

Major junctions
- South end: I-95 Toll / N.J. Turnpike in Elizabeth
- North end: US 1-9 in Elizabeth

Location
- Country: United States
- State: New Jersey
- Counties: Union

Highway system
- New Jersey State Highway Routes; Interstate; US; State; Scenic Byways
← I-80	→ Route 82
← I-76	Route 76	→ Route 76C

Route 81 is a state highway in the U.S. state of New Jersey. The route is a freeway connector between exit 13A of the New Jersey Turnpike (Interstate 95 [I-95]) and U.S. Route 1/9 (US 1/9) near Newark Liberty International Airport. It runs for 1.18 miles (1.90 km), entirely within the city of Elizabeth in Union County. A freeway called Route S100 was initially proposed on the current alignment of Route 81 in 1938; it, along with its parent Route 100, was never built. The current route was conceived in the 1960s as a freeway replacement for Route 164, which followed Humboldt Avenue, a surface road. It was to be designated Route 76, but was renumbered to Route 81 when I-76 was created in New Jersey.

It was legislated in 1966 to run parallel to the New Jersey Turnpike from exit 13 until North Avenue, where it would turn northwest and intersect US 1/9 near the airport. The routing was eventually shifted to begin from a new interchange along the New Jersey Turnpike. A total of $50 million in funding was allocated for the road and the Port Authority of New York and New Jersey was responsible for designing the road. The state had wanted the port authority to pay for construction; however it was ruled that they could not build the road. Construction on Route 81 took place between 1979 and 1982.

== Route description ==
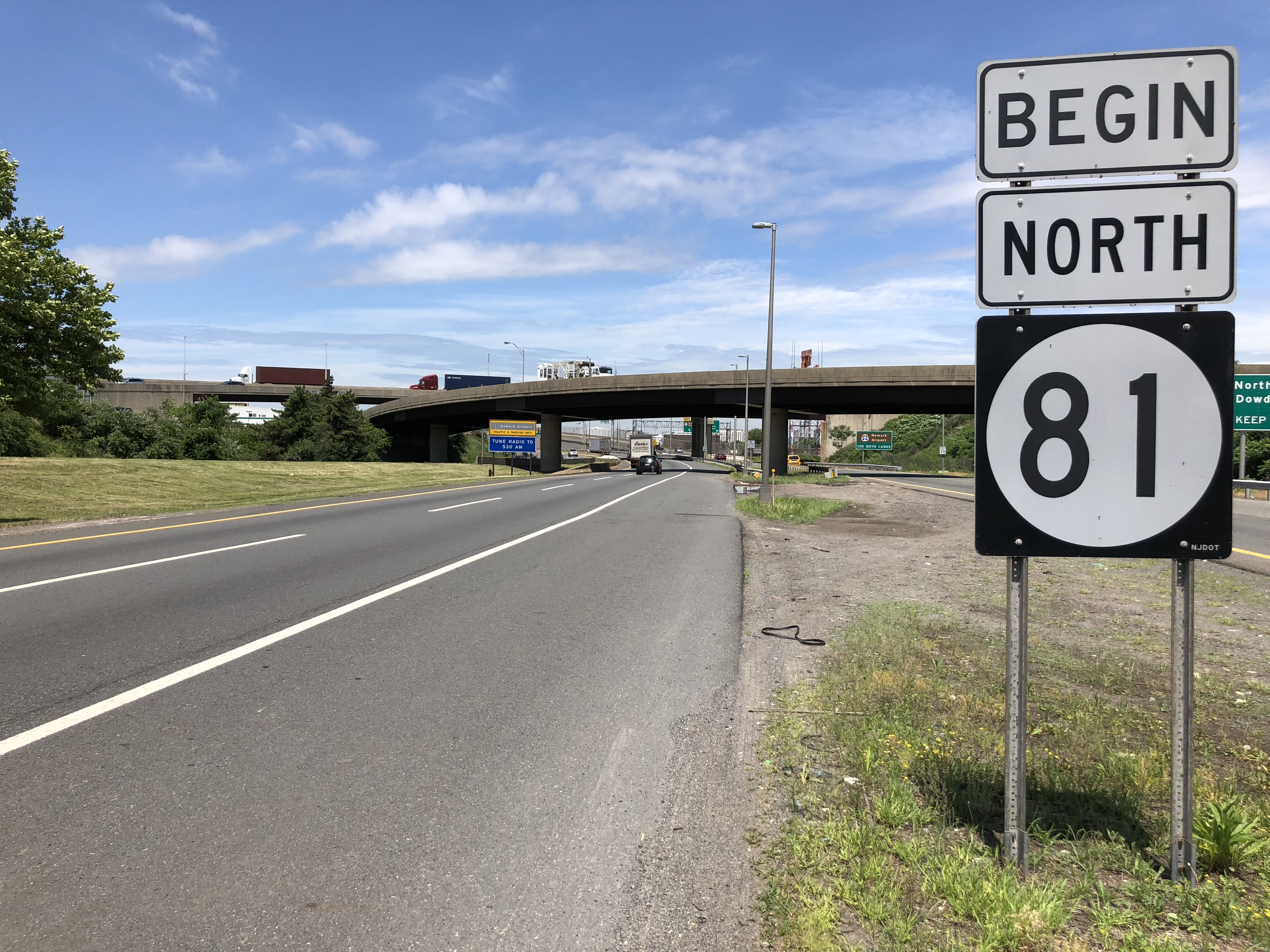
Beginning of northbound Route 81 at I-95 (New Jersey Turnpike) in Elizabeth

Route 81 is a freeway for its entire length through Elizabeth in Union County. It southern terminus is at the toll plaza for exit 13A of the New Jersey Turnpike (I-95), near The Mills at Jersey Gardens shopping mall and Elizabeth Center power center. The route heads north from this interchange as a four-lane a 40 mph (64 km/h) freeway maintained by the New Jersey Turnpike Authority. A short distance north of the toll plaza, the route comes to an interchange with County Route 624 (CR 624, North Avenue), which serves the aforementioned shopping areas as well as the Port Newark-Elizabeth Marine Terminal.

Route 81 heads northwest, running in between the travel lanes of North Avenue for a distance, with industrial areas located to the southwest and Newark Liberty International Airport to the northeast. Upon splitting from North Avenue, Route 81 features a northbound ramp to Newark Liberty International Airport and has an interchange with Dowd Avenue. From here, the route continues along the airport property with three northbound lanes and two southbound lanes maintained by the New Jersey Department of Transportation before reaching its terminus at US 1/9 just south of the Elizabeth–Newark city line. South of the terminus, ramps allow Route 81 traffic to access either the local or express lanes of US 1/9 as well as Newark Liberty International Airport.

== History ==
=== Predecessors to Route 81 ===
Route S100 (planned in 1938)

Route S100 was originally proposed as a freeway on the rough alignment of present-day Route 81 in 1938, running between the proposed Route 100 freeway (now the New Jersey Turnpike) and US 1/9 and Route 25. However, Route S100 was not built. The original plan in the early 1960s for what is now Route 81 was to connect Newark International Airport with Elizabeth Seaport, bypassing Humboldt Avenue, which at the time was designated Route 164; Humboldt Avenue is no longer a state highway. The planned route was initially numbered Route 76, but was renumbered to Route 81 when I-80S in the southern part of the state became I-76. In 1966, Route 81 was legislated to run parallel to the New Jersey Turnpike from exit 13 near the Goethals Bridge north to the vicinity of North Avenue, and head west along the southern edge of the airport to US 1/9. By the 1970s, it was decided by the state of New Jersey to have Route 81 start at a new interchange 13A of the New Jersey Turnpike. In 1975, Governor Brendan Byrne requested $882 million in bonds to construct several roads in New Jersey, including Route 81.

=== Construction begins and finishes ===
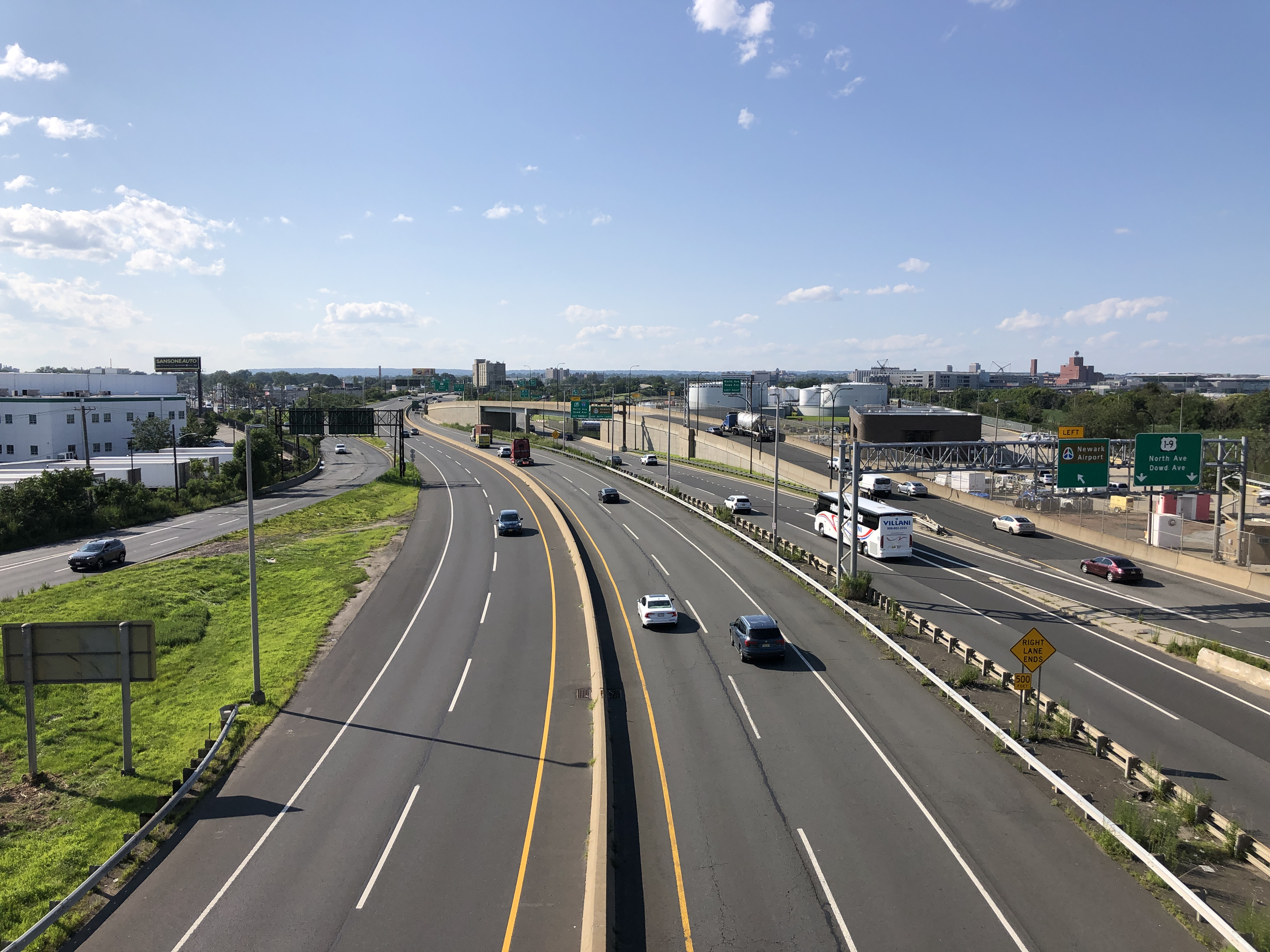
Northbound view along Route 81 at North Avenue in Elizabeth

The state allocated a total of $50 million for construction of Route 81 in 1976, with $16.6 million to be used within the next year, and the design for the proposed road, which was to provide a direct link to Newark Airport, began. The Port Authority of New York and New Jersey (PANY&NJ) was responsible for designing the road and half of the $1.6 million cost was to be paid for by the port authority while the state and the New Jersey Turnpike Authority (NJTA) were to split the other half. In 1977, the state wanted the PANY&NJ to pay the $50 million to build Route 81 and filed suit. However, the state court of appeals ruled in 1978 that the PANY&NJ could not help build the road as it needed permission from both the New Jersey and New York legislatures, who wanted the port authority to focus on mass transit construction to airports.

With the construction of the new interchange on the New Jersey Turnpike, a service area along the turnpike named after William Halsey was subsequently closed down. Exit 13A, in turn, revitalized the Port Newark-Elizabeth Marine Terminal area. A retail center has arisen on the east side of the New Jersey Turnpike in an urban enterprise zone, accessible from the North Avenue exit off Route 81. With the construction of the Jersey Gardens outlet mall, exit 13A was reconstructed by Schoor DePalma Inc and financed by mall owner Glimcher Realty Trust.

== Exit list ==
The entire route is in Elizabeth, Union County. All exits are unnumbered.

mi	km	Destinations	Notes
0.00	0.00	I-95 Toll / N.J. Turnpike – Trenton	Southern terminus; exit 13A on I-95 / Turnpike
0.00	0.00	Exit 13A Toll Plaza	
0.20	0.32	Jersey Gardens Boulevard	Northbound exit and southbound entrance
0.20	0.32	North Avenue east (CR 624) / Ikea Drive – Elizabeth Seaport	Last southbound exit before toll
0.44	0.71	North Avenue west (CR 624) / Dowd Avenue	
0.49	0.79	US 1-9 south – Elizabeth, Trenton	Northbound exit and southbound entrance
0.70	1.13	Newark Liberty International Airport	Northbound exit and southbound entrance
1.18	1.90	US 1-9 north – Newark	Northern terminus
1.000 mi = 1.609 km; 1.000 km = 0.621 mi: Incomplete access; Tolled
