= New Jersey Route 27 =

Highway in New Jersey

Route 27

Route information
- Maintained by NJDOT and Middlesex County
- Length: 38.53 mi (62.01 km)
- Existed: 1927–present
- Tourist routes: Millstone Valley Scenic Byway

Major junctions
- South end: US 206 in Princeton
- Route 18 in New Brunswick; I-287 in Edison; G.S. Parkway in Woodbridge Township; Route 35 in Rahway; Route 439 in Elizabeth; Route 28 in Elizabeth; US 22 in Newark
- North end: Route 21 in Newark

Location
- Country: United States
- State: New Jersey
- Counties: Mercer, Somerset, Middlesex, Union, Essex

Highway system
- New Jersey State Highway Routes; Interstate; US; State; Scenic Byways
| ← Route 26 | → Route 28 |
| ← CR 625 | CR 644 | → CR 646 |

Route 27 is a state highway in New Jersey, United States. It runs 38.53 miles (62.01 km) from U.S. Route 206 (US 206) in Princeton, Mercer County, northeast to an interchange with McCarter Highway (Route 21) and Broad Street in Newark, Essex County. The route passes through many communities along the way, including New Brunswick, Highland Park, Edison, Metuchen, Rahway, and Elizabeth. Route 27 is a two- to four-lane undivided highway for most of its length, passing through a variety of urban and suburban environments. It intersects many roads along the way, including Route 18 in New Brunswick, Interstate 287 (I-287) in Edison, the Garden State Parkway in Woodbridge Township, Route 35 in Rahway, Route 28 in Elizabeth, and US 22 in Newark. Route 27 crosses the Raritan River on the Albany Street Bridge, which connects Highland Park on the east with New Brunswick on the west.

Route 27 was part of the alignment through New Jersey of the Lincoln Highway, the United States' first transcontinental highway that was established in 1913. Route 27 is still referred to as the Lincoln Highway in many municipalities, such as Edison. The Lincoln Highway became part of pre-1927 Route 1 between New Brunswick and Elizabeth in 1916 and pre-1927 Route 13 between Trenton and New Brunswick in 1917. In 1927, the Lincoln Highway was renumbered as Route 27 between Trenton and Newark. US 1 was designated on this portion of the road until it was relocated by the 1940s. US 206 followed the route from Trenton to Princeton until 1953, when the southern terminus of Route 27 was cut back to Princeton to avoid the concurrency with US 206.

== Route description ==
=== Mercer County ===
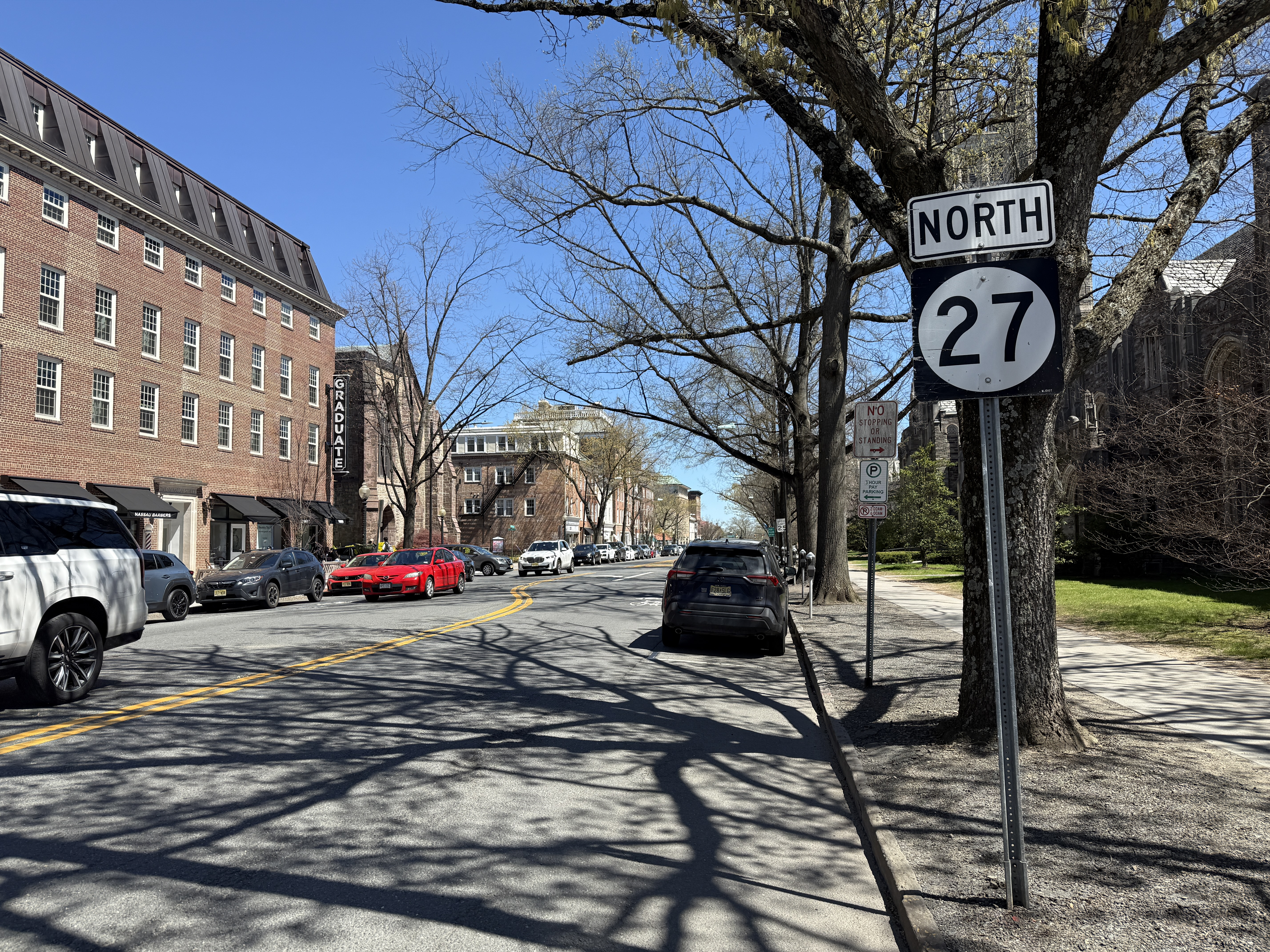
Route 27 on Nassau Street in Princeton

Route 27 begins at a traffic light with US 206 in Downtown Princeton, Mercer County. The route heads northeast along Nassau Street, the main street of Princeton that runs along the northern edge of Princeton University and is lined with numerous shops and restaurants. This portion of Route 27 sees between 10,000 and 20,000 cars a day. Just past the beginning of Route 27, CR 583 heads to the southwest on Mercer Street. Route 27 moves through downtown Princeton, passing by the main gates to Princeton University near Nassau Hall, and intersecting with Washington Road (CR 526/CR 571). After leaving the downtown area, Route 27 continues through residential areas and the route becomes unnamed. Route 27 runs parallel to Carnegie Lake, then crosses over the Millstone River just north of the historic Kingston Bridge. The portion of the road from Princeton to Kingston is part of the King's Highway Historic District.

=== Middlesex–Somerset county line ===
Upon crossing the Millstone River, Route 27 runs along the border of Franklin Township, Somerset County, to the west and South Brunswick, Middlesex County, to the east, passing through the historic community of Kingston. It continues northeast through a mix of woodland and residences, intersecting with Promenade Boulevard, which heads east and becomes CR 522 after crossing US 1. Route 27 briefly runs entirely into Somerset County before resuming along the Middlesex–Somerset county line. The route continues north to an intersection of Gateway Boulevard (CR 518), where it resumes its northeast direction and heads into Kendall Park as a variable two- to four-lane road, entering denser suburban development. In Kendall Park, the road passes northwest of a park and ride lot located at a shopping center. Route 27 then passes through Franklin Park, intersecting with Henderson Road (CR 610). Past that intersection, Route 27 forms the border of Franklin Township to the west and North Brunswick to the east, passing through suburban development with some areas of farmland, seeing about 38,487 cars a day. The road forms the border of Franklin Township and New Brunswick upon intersecting with How Lane (CR 680) becoming four-lane Somerset Street. Route 27 follows Somerset Street northeast through residential and commercial areas, passing by the community of Somerset on the west side of the road.

=== Middlesex County ===
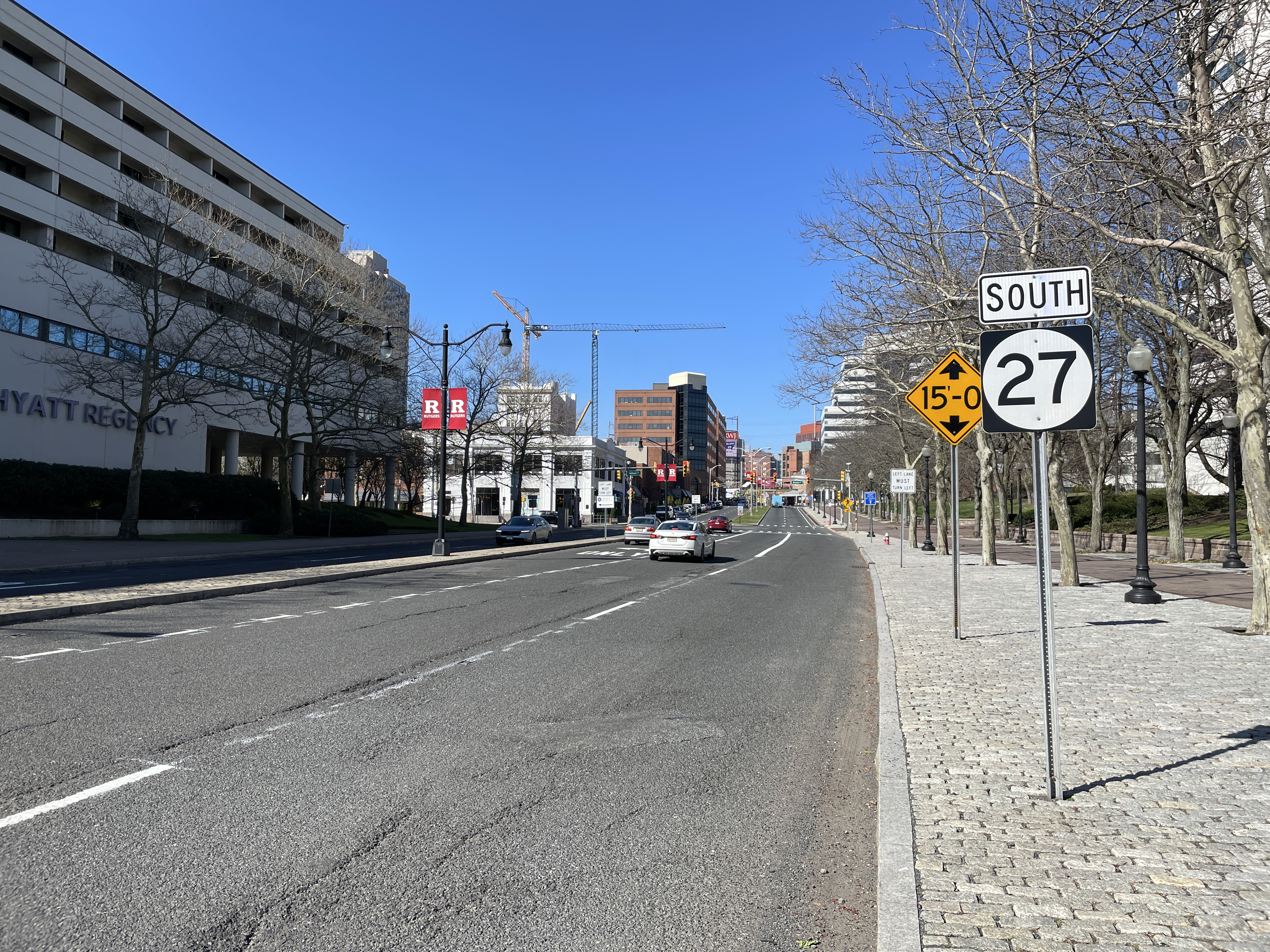
Route 27 southbound past Route 18 and CR 514 in New Brunswick

The route splits from Somerset Street and heads entirely into New Brunswick, Middlesex County, along French Street. At the intersection of Sandford Street, Route 27 becomes a county-maintained road that is also signed as CR 644. It then intersects with Jersey Avenue (CR 693), which heads to the southwest to become Route 91. Past this intersection, the route becomes a two-lane street that heads into Downtown New Brunswick, south of the main campus of Rutgers University. Here, the route has a daily traffic count of approximately 11,559 vehicles. It crosses under Amtrak's Northeast Corridor rail line next to the New Brunswick station serving Amtrak and NJ Transit's Northeast Corridor Line. The route turns into a four-lane divided highway and intersects with Easton Avenue (CR 527). At this point, CR 644 ends, and Route 27 forms a brief concurrency with CR 527, heading east along Albany Street as a city-maintained street. About 200 yards (180 m) later, the road crosses George Street, which heads to the north as CR 672 and to the south as Route 171. CR 527 splits from Albany Street by heading south on Route 171 while Route 27 continues east. After another 0.2 miles (320 m), Route 27 intersects Johnson Drive (CR 514). Route 27 continues along Albany Street as a concurrency with CR 514. It immediately intersects Route 18. At the interchange with Route 18, Route 27 becomes state-maintained again, crossing the Raritan River on the Albany Street Bridge into Highland Park.

Upon entering Highland Park, Route 27 becomes two-lane Raritan Avenue, intersecting with River Road (CR 622) and continuing through the downtown area of Highland Park. CR 514 splits from Route 27 by heading east on Woodbridge Avenue 0.7 mi (1.1 km) later. Route 27 resumes heading northeast past this intersection as a four-lane road that passes by homes, entering Edison, where the name changes to Lincoln Highway. The route continues northeast, intersecting with Suttons Lane/Duclos Lane (CR 676) and Plainfield Avenue (CR 529), then travels through a mix of residences and businesses, briefly becoming a divided highway before intersecting I-287 at a partial interchange with access to southbound I-287 and from northbound I-287. At this interchange, Route 27 sees approximately 14,386 cars a day. Beyond this interchange, Route 27 crosses into Metuchen and becomes two-lane Essex Avenue, which turns to the east and heads through residential areas. The route turns north onto Lake Avenue and intersects with Amboy Avenue (CR 501). Route 27 forms a concurrency with that route. It passes under the Northeast Corridor and comes to Middlesex Avenue, where CR 501 turns to the left and Route 27 turns to the right to resume its northeast direction.

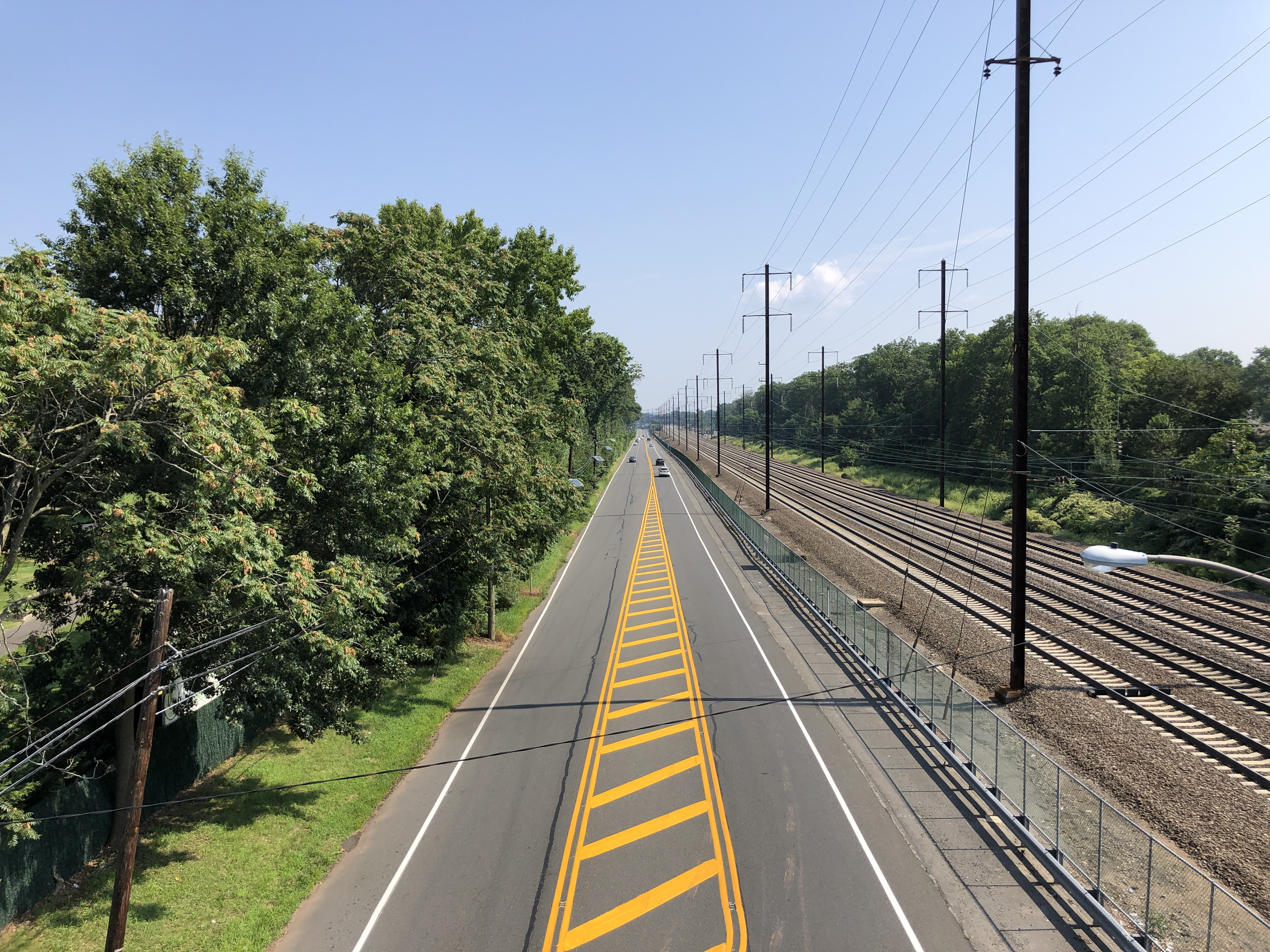
Route 27 northbound at CR 650 (New Dover Road) in Woodbridge Township, running parallel to the Northeast Corridor rail line

Route 27 intersects with Main Street (CR 531) after 0.2 miles (0.32 km) and continues northeast on Middlesex Avenue, passing through a residential environment where the route carries about 22,414 vehicles daily. The road comes to a bridge over Conrail Shared Assets Operations' (CSAO) Port Reading Secondary line. The route crosses back into Edison and becomes Lincoln Highway again, passing over the Rahway River. It heads through business areas and passes near the Thomas Alva Edison Memorial Tower and Museum, which is located on the site of Thomas Edison's Menlo Park laboratory. The route closely parallels the Northeast Corridor rail line and crosses into Woodbridge Township, widening to four lanes at this point. Route 27 passes by the Metropark station serving Amtrak and NJ Transit trains and has an interchange with the Garden State Parkway near Iselin, where approximately 19,780 vehicles travel on Route 27 on a daily basis. Past the Garden State Parkway, Route 27 narrows back to two lanes and continues northeast alongside the Northeast Corridor, passing through a mix of residential and commercial development as a three-lane road with two northbound lanes and one southbound lane.

=== Union and Essex counties ===
Route 27 crosses into Rahway, Union County, and intersects with the northern terminus of Route 35, where that route heads south on St. Georges Avenue. Route 27 continues north using four-lane St. Georges Avenue. The route passes through Rahway, passing by residences and businesses. In Rahway, the route sees about 25,022 cars a day. It continues northeast, intersecting multiple streets, such as West Inman Avenue (CR 602), West Hazelwood Avenue (CR 621), West Milton Avenue (CR 648), and Westfield Avenue/West Grand Avenue (CR 613). The route crosses into Linden when passing the intersection of Stuart Place, where the route heads through a more commercial setting with businesses lining both sides of the road. In Linden, the road intersects with North Stiles Street (CR 615). At the intersection of Wood Avenue (CR 617), Route 27 forms the border of Roselle to the west and Linden to the east, and about 23,081 vehicles use the road on a daily basis. The route crosses the inactive Rahway Valley Railroad line that is owned by the Staten Island Railway. It passes by Warinaco Park and forms the border between Elizabeth to the west and Linden to the east before entirely entering Elizabeth at the intersection of Richford Terrace.

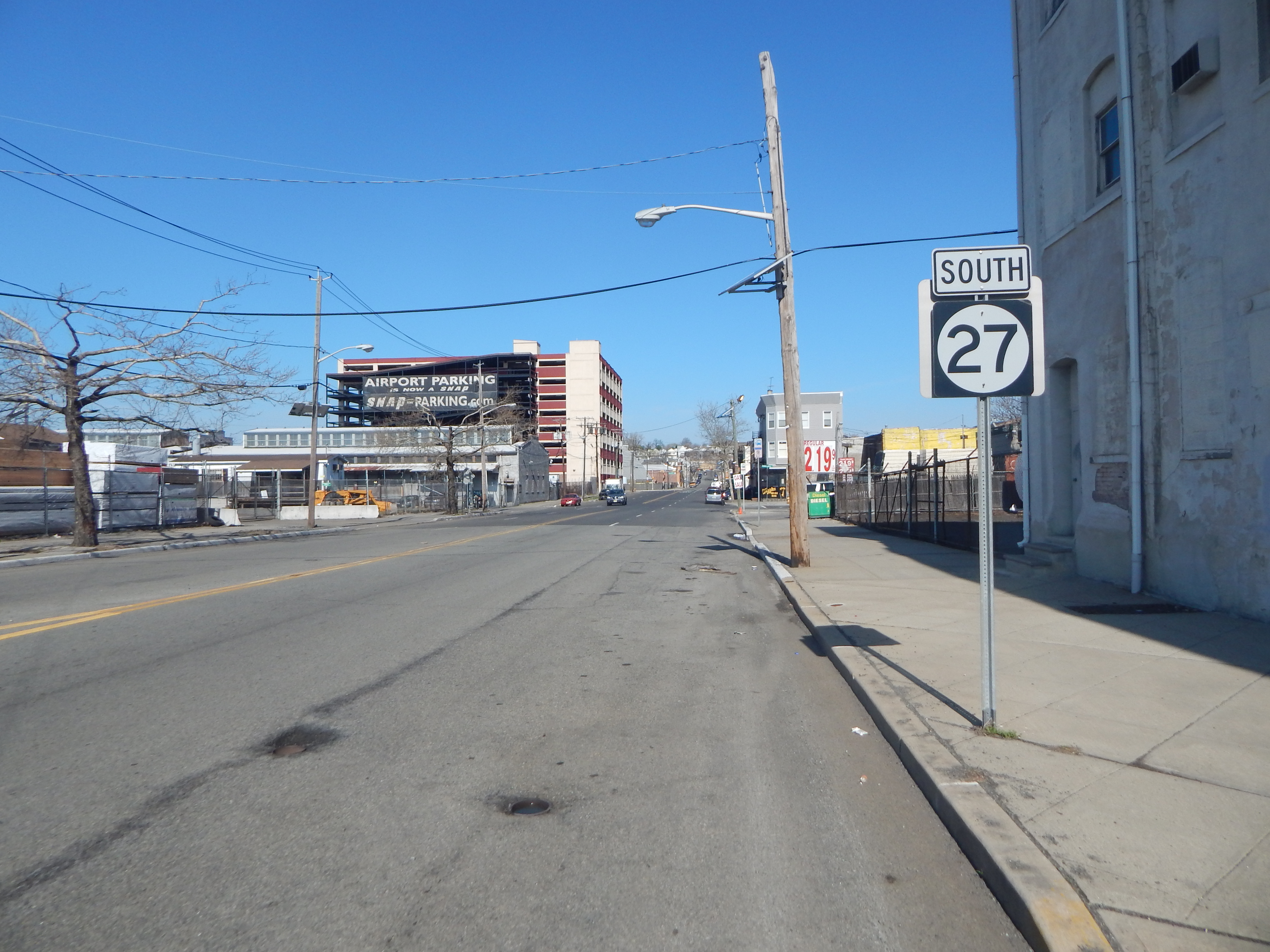
The first reassurance shield on Route 27 in Newark

In Elizabeth, Route 27 narrows to two lanes and becomes Rahway Avenue, crossing the intersection of South Elmora Avenue (Route 439) and continuing to the northeast through residential and commercial areas. Route 27 splits into a one-way pair with northbound Route 27 following Rahway Avenue east and turning north onto Cherry Street and southbound Route 27 following Westfield Avenue west and turning south onto Chilton Street. The southbound direction of Route 27 intersects with the eastern terminus of Route 28, where that route continues west on Westfield Avenue. Past the one-way pair, Route 27 resumes east on four-lane Westfield Avenue, turning north onto Broad Street. The route heads into a more urbanized setting and continues northeast onto Newark Avenue, intersecting with the northern terminus of Route 439, where that route heads west on North Avenue. Through Elizabeth, about 10,000 to 20,000 vehicles travel on Route 27 every day.

Route 27 crosses into Newark, Essex County, at the intersection of Virginia Street, where it becomes Frelinghuysen Avenue, a road that heads north through the Dayton neighborhood of Newark, passing through urban areas and by Weequahic Park. Route 27 interchanges with US 22 and immediately passes under I-78. Route 27 continues north, passing under railroad tracks carrying CSAO's Lehigh Line and NJ Transit's Raritan Valley Line and crossing CSAO's Poinier Street Lead line/Irvington-Hillside Industrial Branch at-grade, before it comes to an intersection of Poinier Street, where the route heads east along that road to its northern terminus at an interchange with McCarter Highway (Route 21) and Broad Street.

== History ==
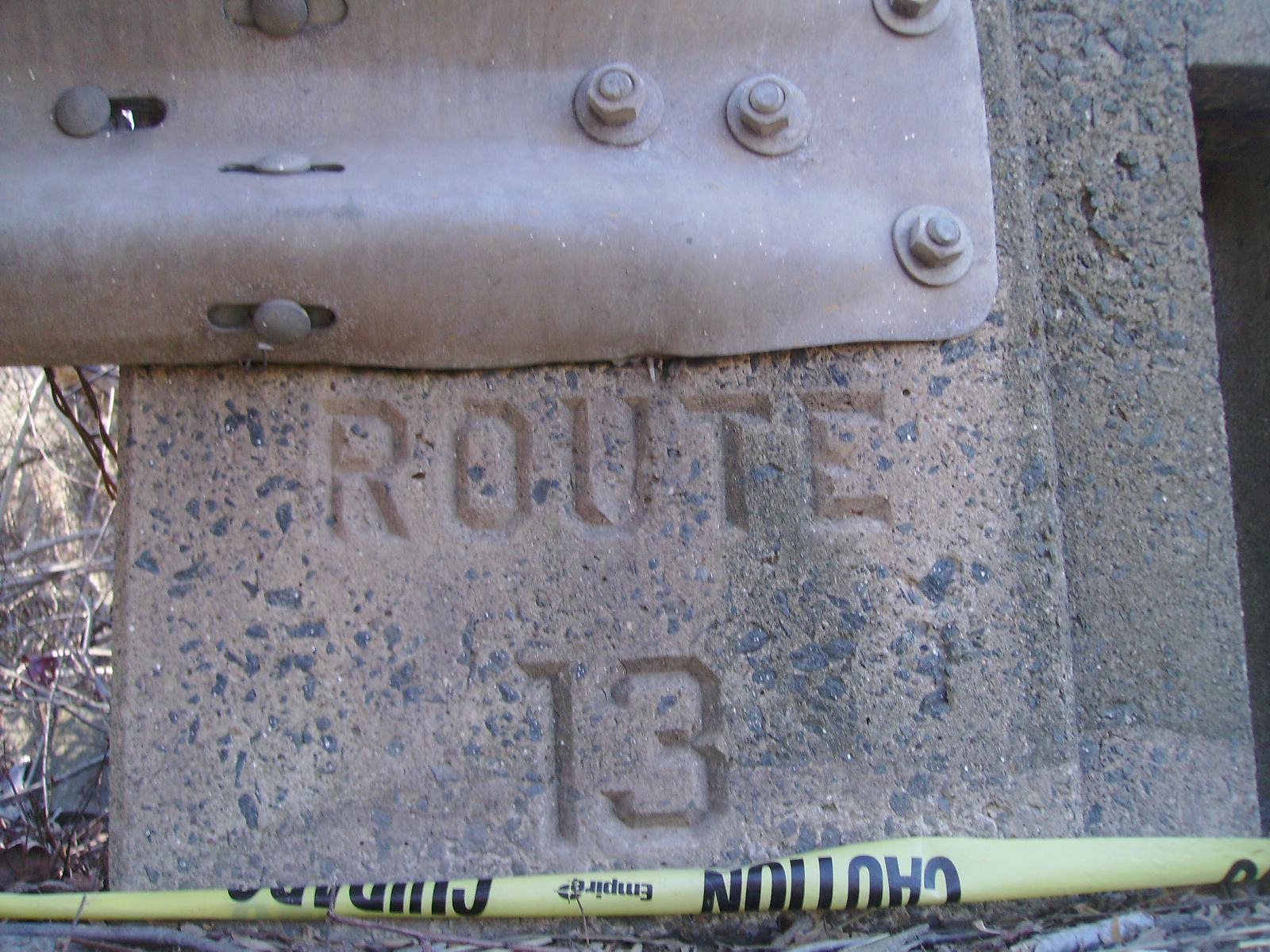
State bridge built in 1919 engraved with the former State Highway Route 13 designation assigned in 1917

The southern part of Route 27 follows the Lenape Assunpink Trail that during the colonial era was known as the Old Dutch Trail, and later became the Kings Highway. North of Rahway, the road was created as Queen Anne's Road, running from Perth Amboy to Elizabethtown Point, with later extensions to Newark and Jersey City. This road would have several names over the following years: it was renamed the King's Highway when it was extended by King George to Jersey City, then to the Post Road during the Revolutionary War, then the Old Country Road after, then finally St. Georges Avenue when Rahway was incorporated as a city.

Route 27 follows portions of several 19th-century turnpikes, including the Essex and Middlesex Turnpike, which was chartered on March 3, 1806, to run from New Brunswick to Newark along what is today Route 27, the Northeast Corridor rail line, and Broad Street in Newark, the Georgetown and Franklin Turnpike, chartered on February 15, 1816, to run from Lambertville to New Brunswick along the present-day alignments of CR 518 and Route 27, the Newark and Elizabeth Plank Road, chartered on March 14, 1856, and the Princeton and Kingston Branch Turnpike, chartered on December 3, 1807, to run from Trenton to Kingston along current CR 583 and Route 27. The route became a portion of the Lincoln Highway, the United States' first transcontinental highway that was established in 1913 to run from New York City to San Francisco. It is still known by that name in a few places along the route, particularly in Edison Township.

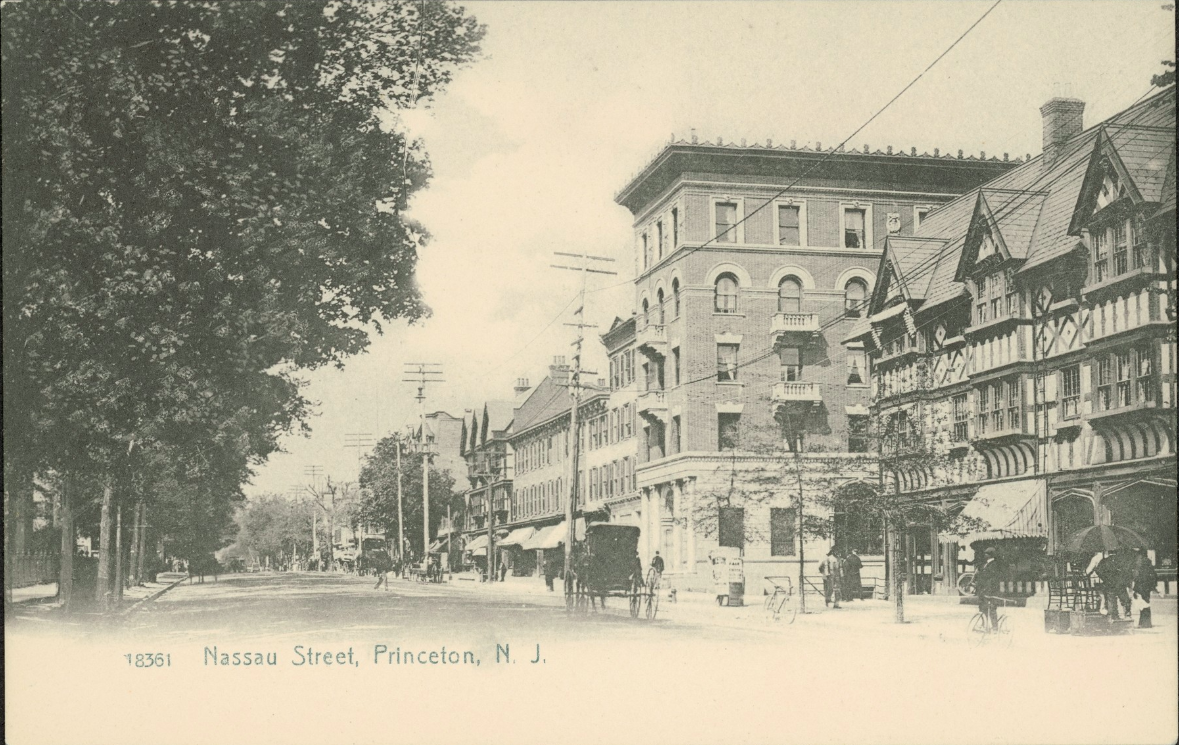
Route 27 (Nassau Street) in Princeton in the 1910s

In 1916, the Lincoln Highway was legislated as part of pre-1927 Route 1 between New Brunswick and Elizabeth and as pre-1927 Route 13 between Trenton and New Brunswick in 1917. In the 1927 New Jersey state highway renumbering, Route 27 was designated to run from Trenton to the intersection of Frelinghuysen Avenue and Astor Street in Newark, replacing the portions of Routes 1 and 13 that ran along the Lincoln Highway. With the creation of the U.S. Highway System, US 1 was designated along the length of Route 27 from 1927 until sometime before the 1940s, when the US 1 designation was moved to Route 26, Route S26, and Route 25 between Trenton and Newark. US 206 was designated along the portion of route between Trenton and Princeton by the 1940s. In the 1953 New Jersey state highway renumbering, the southern terminus of Route 27 was cut back to Princeton to avoid the concurrency with US 206.

== Major intersections ==
| County | Location | mi | km | Destinations | Notes |
|---|---|---|---|---|---|
| Mercer | Princeton | 0.00 | 0.00 | US 206 (Bayard Lane / Stockton Street) – Lawrenceville, Trenton, Princeton Airport | Southern terminus |
| Mercer | Princeton | 0.04 | 0.064 | CR 583 south (Mercer Street) | Northern terminus of CR 583 |
| Mercer | Princeton | 0.40 | 0.64 | CR 526 east / CR 571 south (Washington Road) to N.J. Turnpike | Western terminus of CR 526; northern terminus of CR 571 |
| Middlesex–Somerset county line | South Brunswick–Franklin township line | 6.90 | 11.10 | CR 518 west (Gateway Boulevard) – Rocky Hill | Eastern terminus of CR 518 |
| Middlesex | New Brunswick | 16.22 | 26.10 | CR 527 north (Easton Avenue) | Southern end of CR 527 concurrency |
| Middlesex | New Brunswick | 16.32 | 26.26 | Route 171 south (George Street) CR 672 north (George Street) | Northern end of unsigned CR 527 concurrency; northern terminus of Route 171; southern terminus of CR 672 |
| Middlesex | New Brunswick | 16.51 | 26.57 | CR 514 west (Johnson Drive) | Southern end of CR 514 concurrency; no access from Route 27 north to CR 514 west |
| Middlesex | New Brunswick | 16.55 | 26.63 | Route 18 south to N.J. Turnpike | No access to Route 18 north or from Route 18 south; interchange |
| Middlesex | Raritan River | 16.65 | 26.80 | Albany Street Bridge | |
| Middlesex | Highland Park | 17.48 | 28.13 | CR 514 east (Woodbridge Avenue) | Northern end of CR 514 concurrency |
| Middlesex | Edison | 18.86 | 30.35 | CR 529 (Plainfield Avenue) – New Market, Dunellen, Motor Vehicle Inspection Station and Agency | |
| Middlesex | Edison | 20.82– 20.84 | 33.51– 33.54 | I-287 south to N.J. Turnpike / G.S. Parkway | No access I-287 north or from I-287 south; exits 2A–B on I-287 |
| Middlesex | Metuchen | 21.62 | 34.79 | CR 501 east (Amboy Avenue) | Southern end of CR 501 concurrency |
| Middlesex | Metuchen | 21.86 | 35.18 | CR 501 west (Middlesex Avenue) to I-287 north | Northern end CR 501 concurrency |
| Middlesex | Metuchen | 22.07 | 35.52 | CR 531 (Main Street) – Plainfield, Metuchen Business District | |
| Middlesex | Woodbridge Township | 24.69 | 39.73 | G.S. Parkway | Exit 132 (Garden State Parkway), was exit 131 until March 2015 |
| Union | Rahway | 27.29 | 43.92 | Route 35 south (St. Georges Avenue) to N.J. Turnpike | Northern terminus of Route 35 |
| Union | Elizabeth | 32.98 | 53.08 | Route 439 (South Elmora Avenue) | |
| Union | Elizabeth | 34.00 | 54.72 | Route 28 west (Westfield Avenue) | Eastern terminus of Route 28 |
| Union | Elizabeth | 35.29 | 56.79 | Route 439 south (North Avenue) | Northern terminus of Route 439; to North Elizabeth station |
| Essex | Newark | 37.31 | 60.04 | US 22 to N.J. Turnpike | Interchange; entrance to US 22 west via Empire Street; exit from US 22 east via Victoria Street |
| Essex | Newark | 38.39– 38.53 | 61.78– 62.01 | Route 21 (McCarter Highway) / Broad Street | Direct access to Route 21 north only; interchange; northern terminus |
1.000 mi = 1.609 km; 1.000 km = 0.621 mi: Concurrency terminus; Incomplete access
