= List of county routes in Union County, New Jersey =

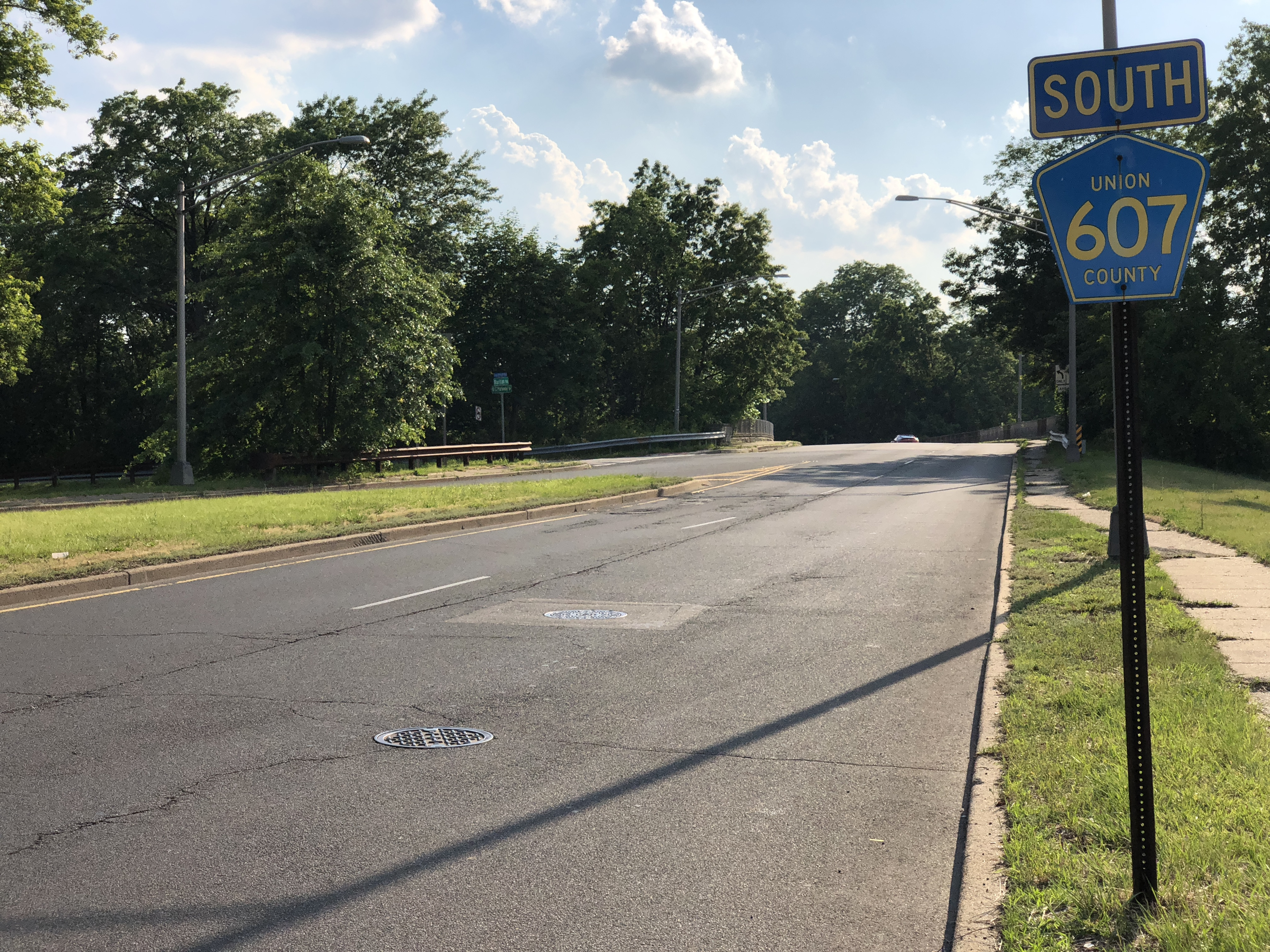
CR 607 (Raritan Road) along the border of Cranford and Winfield

The following is a list of county routes in Union County in the U.S. state of New Jersey. For more information on the county route system in New Jersey as a whole, including its history, see County routes in New Jersey.

== 500-series county routes ==
In addition to those listed below, the following 500-series county routes serve Union County:

- CR 509, CR 509 Spur, CR 512, CR 514, CR 527, CR 531, CR 577

== Other county routes ==
Route	Length (mi)	Length (km)	From	Via	To	Notes
CR 601	4.51	7.26	West 7th Street (CR 601) at the Middlesex County line in Plainfield	West 7th Street, East 7th Street, La Grande Avenue, Laurel Place	South Avenue (Route 28) in Fanwood	
CR 602	0.79	1.27	Inman Avenue (CR 602) at the Middlesex County line in Rahway	West Inman Avenue	St. Georges Avenue (Route 27) in Rahway	
CR 603	0.93	1.50	Plainfield Avenue (CR 603) at the Middlesex County line in Plainfield	Plainfield Avenue	Plainfield Avenue (Route 28) and West 5th Street (Route 28) in Plainfield	
CR 604	1.72	2.77	Raritan Road (CR 607) in Clark	Madison Hill Road	Westfield Avenue (CR 613) on the Clark/Rahway border	
CR 605	0.2	0.32	Springfield Avenue (CR 509/CR 577) and East Broad Street (CR 509/CR 577) in Westfield	Nomahegan Drive	Dead end in Westfield	Unsigned
CR 606	2.4	3.86	West Broad Street (CR 653) in Scotch Plains	Lamberts Mill Road	Rahway Avenue in Westfield	
CR 607	4.9	7.89	Middlesex County line in Clark	Oak Ridge Road, Raritan Road	Wood Avenue (CR 617) on the Linden/Roselle border	
CR 608	1.4	2.25	Central Avenue (CR 613) in Clark	Valley Road	North Stiles Street (CR 615) in Linden	
CR 609	0.86	1.38	St. Georges Avenue (Route 35) in Rahway	New Brunswick Avenue	West Hazelwood Avenue (CR 621) and East Hazelwood Avenue (CR 621) in Rahway	
CR 610	9.86	15.87	Terrill Road (CR 611) on the Fanwood/Plainfield border	Midway Avenue, North Avenue, South Avenue, West 1st Avenue, East 1st Avenue, West Grand Street, East Grand Street	Cherry Street (Route 27) in Elizabeth	
CR 611	4	6.44	Lamberts Mill Road (CR 606) in Scotch Plains	Raritan Road, Terrill Road	Somerset County line in Scotch Plains	
CR 612	3.06	4.92	Amsterdam Avenue (CR 617) in Roselle	West 3rd Avenue, Jersey Avenue, West Jersey Street	Cherry Street (Route 27) in Elizabeth	
CR 613	9.53	15.34	US 1/9 in Rahway	East Grand Avenue, West Grand Avenue, Westfield Avenue, Brant Avenue, Central Avenue, East Broad Street, Mountain Avenue	US 22 in Mountainside	
CR 614	0.92	1.48	Rahway Avenue (Route 27) in Elizabeth	Pearl Street	US 1/9 in Elizabeth	
CR 615	5.55	8.93	US 1/9 in Linden	South Stiles Street, North Stiles Street, Centennial Avenue, North Avenue East, Springfield Avenue	Springfield Avenue (CR 509) and Kenilworth Boulevard (CR 509) in Cranford	
CR 616	2	3.22	Rosewood Avenue in Roselle	Linden Road, Westfield Avenue, Galloping Hill Road	Galloping Hill Road (CR 509) and Salem Road (CR 509) in Union	Route 28 in Roselle Park
CR 617	5.7	9.17	US 1/9 in Linden	South Wood Avenue, North Wood Avenue, Amsterdam Avenue, 1st Avenue, Gordon Street, Westfield Avenue, Faitoute Avenue, Michigan Avenue	US 22 in Union	
CR 618	2.70	4.35	Chestnut Street (CR 627) in Roselle Park	East Lincoln Avenue, Magie Avenue, Orchard Street	Morris Avenue (CR 629) in Elizabeth	
CR 619	6.38	10.27	Elizabeth Avenue (CR 514) in Linden	Roselle Street, Chestnut Street, East 9th Avenue, Locust Street, Tucker Avenue, Chestnut Street, Stuyvesant Avenue	Stuyvesant Avenue (CR 619) at Essex County line in Union	
CR 620	3.14	5.05	West Front Street (Route 28) and Plainfield Avenue (Route 28) in Plainfield	West Front Street, East Front Street, Front Street	Park Avenue (CR 655) in Scotch Plains	
CR 621	1.75	2.82	St. Georges Avenue (Route 27) in Rahway	West Hazelwood Avenue, East Hazelwood Avenue, Hart Street	Randolph Avenue (CR 602) at the Middlesex County line in Rahway	
CR 622	6.60	10.62	Mountain Avenue (CR 622) at the Somerset County line in Berkeley Heights	Mountain Avenue, Ashland Road, Mountain Avenue	Morris Avenue (CR 651) in Summit	
CR 623	3.86	6.21	Bayway (Route 439) in Elizabeth	South Broad Street, North Broad Street	Essex County line in Hillside	
CR 624	0.6	0.97	Plainfield Avenue (CR 641) in Berkeley Heights	Horseshoe Road	Mountain Avenue (CR 622) in Berkeley Heights	
CR 625	0.69	1.11	Chestnut Street (CR 619) and 9th Avenue (CR 619) in Roselle	Chestnut Street	1st Avenue (CR 610) in Roselle	
CR 626	0.91	1.46	US 22 in Union	West Chestnut Street	Chestnut Street (CR 619) and Stuyvesant Avenue (CR 619) in Union	
CR 627	1.08	1.74	Westfield Avenue (Route 28) in Roselle Park	Chestnut Street	Galloping Hill Road (CR 509), Chestnut Street (CR 509), and Tucker Avenue (CR 619) in Union	
CR 628	0.73	1.17	Hillside Avenue (CR 509) and Chestnut Avenue (CR 509) in Hillside	Hillside Avenue	North Broad Street (CR 623) in Hillside	
CR 629	0.74	1.19	Westfield Avenue (Route 27) in Elizabeth	Morris Avenue	Morris Avenue (Route 82) and North Avenue (Route 439) in Union	
CR 630	5.1	8.21	Vauxhall Road (CR 630 Alt.) at the Essex County line in Union	Vauxhall Road, Salem Road, Conant Street	Salem Avenue in Hillside	
CR 631	0.88	1.42	Liberty Avenue (CR 509) in Hillside	Bloy Street, Hillside Avenue	Hillside Avenue (CR 509) and Chestnut Avenue (CR 509) in Hillside	Decommissioned
CR 632	2	3.22	Valley Road (CR 608) and Broadway in Clark	Walnut Avenue	South Avenue (CR 610) in Cranford	
CR 633	1.6	2.57	Morris Avenue (Route 82) in Union	Burnet Avenue	Essex County line in Union	
CR 634	2.07	3.33	US 22 in Scotch Plains	Willow Avenue, Mountain Avenue	US 22 in Westfield	
CR 635	2.26	3.64	US 22 in Mountainside	Mountain Avenue	Morris Avenue (Route 124) in Springfield	
CR 636	1.6	2.57	Morris Avenue (CR 527) in Summit	Orchard Street, Shunpike Road	South Springfield Avenue (CR 639) in Springfield	
CR 637	0.84	1.35	Magnolia Avenue in Elizabeth	Jefferson Avenue	North Avenue in Elizabeth	
CR 638	0.2	0.32	Acme Street in Elizabeth	Linden Avenue	Elmora Avenue (Route 439) in Elizabeth	
CR 639	0.7	1.13	South Springfield Avenue (CR 577) and Meisel Avenue (CR 577) in Springfield	South Springfield Avenue	Mountain Avenue (CR 635) in Springfield	
CR 640	0.75	1.21	Diamond Hill Road (CR 655) in Berkeley Heights	McMane Avenue	Glenside Avenue (CR 527) in Berkeley Heights	
CR 641	2.6	4.18	Valley Road (CR 527) and Bonnie Burn Road (CR 695) in Watchung	Plainfield Avenue	Springfield Avenue (CR 512) in Berkeley Heights	Route runs through a portion of Somerset County, but is entirely maintained by Union County. Former southern segment (Bonnie Burn Road) transferred to Somerset County as CR 695 in October 2023.
CR 642	4.09	6.58	Glenside Avenue (CR 527) and Valley Road (CR 527) in Berkeley Heights	Sky Top Drive, Coles Avenue, New Providence Road, Summit Lane	Summit Road (CR 643) in Mountainside	
CR 643	2.37	3.81	US 22 in Mountainside	Summit Road, Baltusrol Road	Glenside Avenue (CR 527) in Summit	
CR 644	0.90	1.45	Sky Top Drive (CR 642) and Coles Avenue (CR 642) in Mountainside	Tanager Way, Deer Path	Deer Path (CR 645) and W.R. Tracy Drive (CR 645) in Mountainside	
CR 645	3.46	5.57	Mountain Avenue (CR 613) in Mountainside	New Providence Road, Deer Path, W.R. Tracy Drive	Glenside Avenue (CR 527) in Summit	
CR 646	0.1	0.16	Rahway Avenue (CR 658) in Elizabeth	Elizabethtown Plaza	Caldwell Place in Elizabeth	Serves county complex
CR 647	1.9	3.06	Mountain Avenue (CR 622) in New Providence	South Street, Passaic Street	River Road (CR 647) at the Morris County line in New Providence	
CR 648	1.29	2.08	St. Georges Avenue (Route 27) in Rahway	West Milton Avenue, East Milton Avenue	US 1/9 in Rahway	
CR 649	2.21	3.56	Springfield Avenue (CR 512) in Summit	Constantine Place, Passaic Avenue, River Road, JFK Parkway	Route 24 and JFK Parkway (CR 649) at the Essex County line in Summit	
CR 650	1.38	2.22	St. Georges Avenue (Route 27) in Rahway	West Scott Avenue, East Scott Avenue	US 1/9 in Rahway	
CR 651	2.3	3.70	Morris Avenue (CR 527) and Glenside Avenue (CR 527) in Summit	Morris Avenue, River Road, Chatham Road	Summit Avenue at the Morris County line in Summit	
CR 652	0.4	0.64	Valley Road (CR 608) in Clark	Ross Street	St. Georges Avenue (Route 27) in Rahway	
CR 653	0.77	1.24	Lamberts Mill Road (CR 606) in Scotch Plains	West Broad Street	South Avenue (Route 28) in Westfield	
CR 654	0.67	1.08	Mountain Avenue (CR 635) in Springfield	Hillside Avenue	US 22 in Springfield	
CR 655	6.84	11.01	Oak Ridge Road (CR 607) in Clark	Lake Avenue, Martine Avenue, Park Avenue, New Providence Road, Diamond Hill Road	Mountain Avenue (CR 622) on the Berkeley Heights/New Providence border	Gap in route through a portion of Somerset County as CR 655
CR 656	0.71	1.14	Fairway Drive South in Union	Fairway Drive East	Chestnut Street (CR 619) in Union	
CR 657	1.5	2.41	Morris Avenue (CR 651) in Summit	Summit Avenue	Route 124 in Summit	
CR 658	0.2	0.32	South Broad Street (CR 623) and Elizabeth Avenue in Elizabeth	Rahway Avenue	Rahway Avenue (Route 27) and Cherry Street (Route 27) in Elizabeth	Serves county complex
CR 660	0.39	0.63	Coles Avenue (CR 642) in Mountainside	Ackerman Avenue	Deer Path (CR 644) in Mountainside	
