= Newark–Pompton Turnpike =

Newark-Pompton Turnpike
- Newark-Pompton Turnpike highlighted in red

Route information
- Maintained by NJDOT, Essex County, Passaic County, and Morris County
- Length: 19.20 mi (30.90 km)
- Existed: 1806–present
- Component highways: CR 506 Spur from Newark to Glen Ridge; CR 506 from Glen Ridge to Verona; Route 23 from Verona to Wayne, in Wayne, and from Pequannock Township to Riverdale; CR 703 in Wayne; US 202 in Wayne; CR 683 in Wayne; CR 504 from Wayne to Pequannock Township; CR 660 in Pequannock Township; CR 511 Alt. in Riverdale

Major junctions
- South end: CR 506 Spur / CR 667 in Newark
- CR 506 in Glen Ridge; Route 23 / CR 577 in Verona; I-80 / US 46 / Route 23 / CR 703 in Wayne; US 202 / CR 511 Alt. in Wayne; CR 504 in Wayne; Route 23 in Pequannock Township; CR 511 Alt. in Pequannock Township
- North end: CR 511 Alt. / CR 694 in Riverdale

Location
- Country: United States
- State: New Jersey

Highway system
- New Jersey State Highway Routes; Interstate; US; State; Scenic Byways
← CR 702	→ CR 704
← CR 682	→ CR 684
← CR 659	→ CR 661

The Newark-Pompton Turnpike (now known in portions of its former route as Pompton Avenue, Route 23, and Bloomfield Avenue), is a roadway in northern New Jersey that was originally a tolled turnpike. The roadway was first laid out in the mid-18th century and given its name in 1806. As originally designed, it connected Newark with the area north and west of the Pompton River in what is now Riverdale. Its south end is Broadway in Newark; its north end is the Paterson-Hamburg Turnpike. As such, it was part of an alternate route between Newark and Paterson.

In 1917, the road was designated as part of New Jersey State Highway 8. After the 1927 New Jersey State Highway renumbering, part of the road became Route 23, while another section became part of Route 9 (now County Route 506 or CR 506).

Charlie Barnet recorded the song Pompton Turnpike, which was written by Will Osborne and Dick Rogers, about the Meadowbrook, a swing era performance venue on Pompton Avenue in Cedar Grove, NJ. It is now a Macedonian Orthodox Church. The song was covered as a jazz/blues vocal version by Louis Jordan, the "King of the Jukebox" in the 1940s.

President Grover Cleveland was born in a small house in Caldwell on the turnpike, now Bloomfield Avenue, west of the Pompton Avenue intersection. The house exists today in its original condition as a tourist attraction. Cleveland's father's church stands a few tenths of a mile down Bloomfield Avenue from Cleveland's original home.

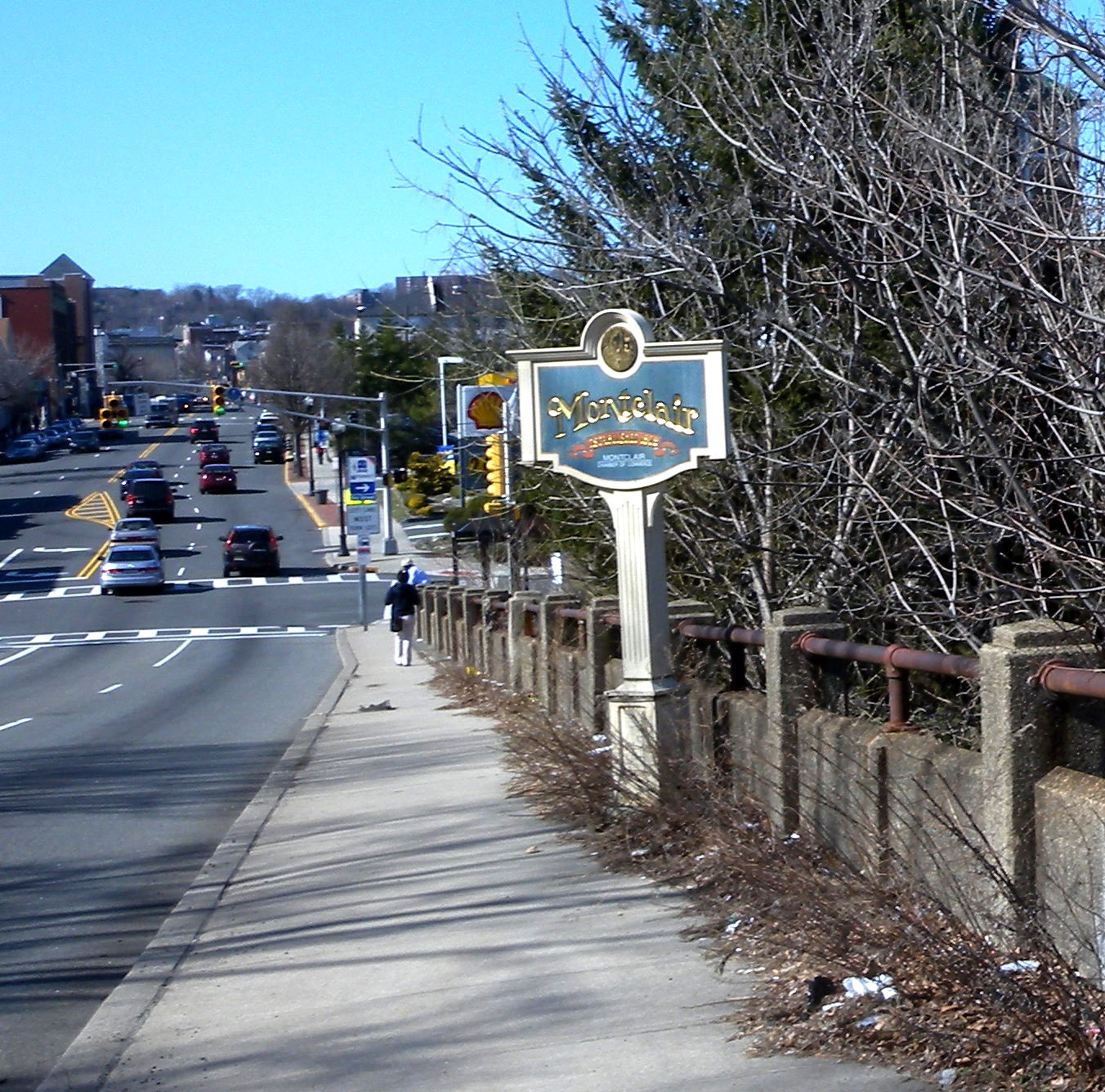
Northbound into Montclair

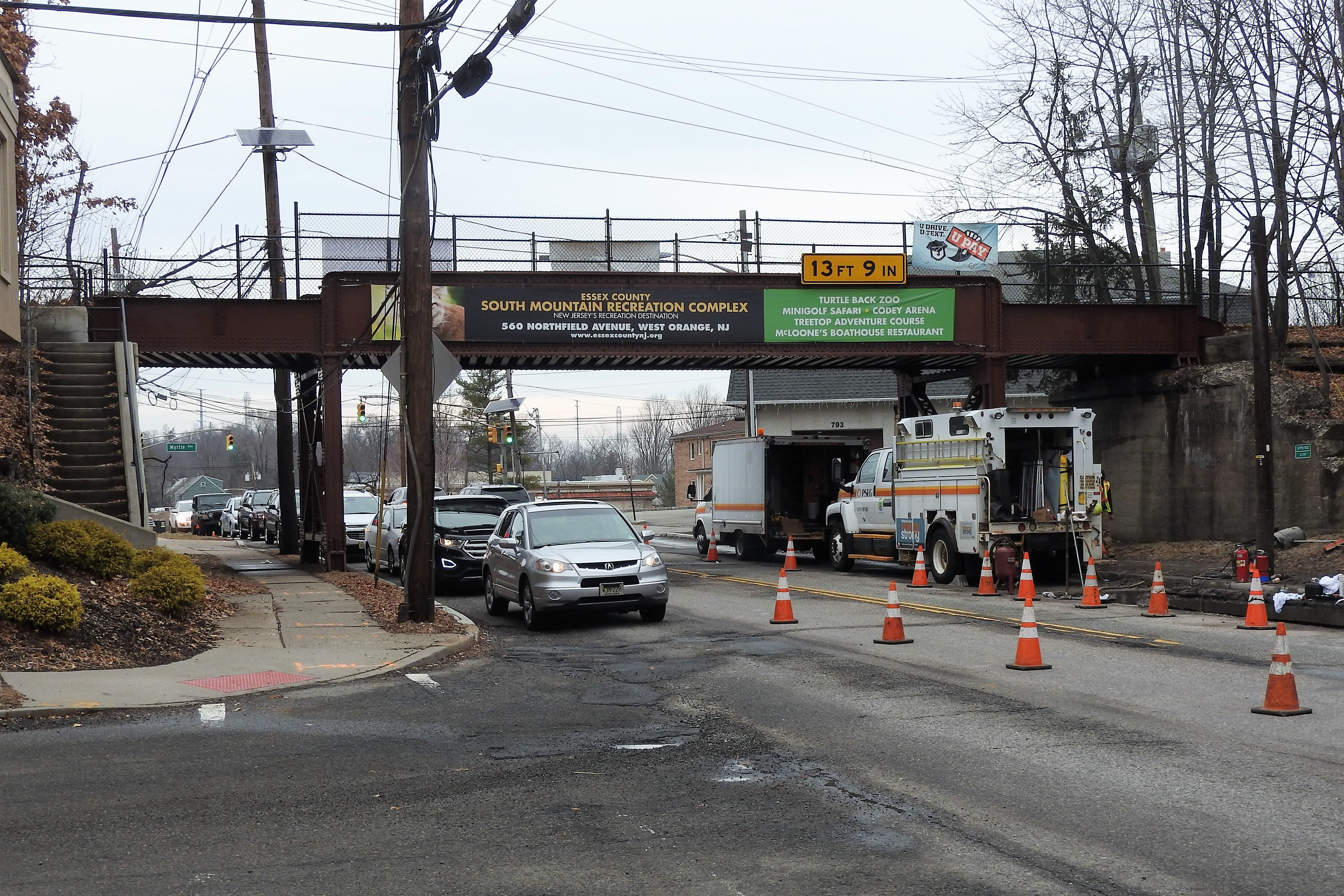
Under the West Essex Trail in Cedar Grove

The road passes through the following New Jersey communities:

- Newark: Bloomfield Avenue (CR 506 SPUR)
- Belleville: Bloomfield Avenue (CR 506 SPUR)
- Bloomfield: Bloomfield Avenue (CR 506 SPUR)
- Glen Ridge: Bloomfield Avenue (CR 506 SPUR, CR 506)
- Montclair: Bloomfield Avenue (CR 506)
- Verona: Bloomfield Avenue (CR 506), Pompton Avenue (Route 23)
- Cedar Grove: Pompton Avenue (Route 23)
- Little Falls: Newark-Pompton Turnpike (Route 23)
- Wayne: Old Turnpike Road (CR 703), Route 23, Newark-Pompton Turnpike (CR 683, CR 504)
- Pequannock: Newark-Pompton Turnpike (CR 504, CR 660), Route 23
- Riverdale: Route 23, Newark-Pompton Turnpike (CR 511 ALT)

To follow the road in Wayne, it is necessary to turn right onto Hobson Ave immediately after crossing the Passaic River from Little Falls, cross under a railroad trestle, and turn left onto Old Turnpike Road. Route 23 bypasses this short stretch of the old road, and it is impossible to return to Route 23 at the north end of this short stretch.

== History ==
In 1806, Israel Crane, a prominent businessman closely associated with the development of Montclair and Bloomfield, obtained a charter on February 24, 1806 from the state to build the private road, in the name of the "Newark and Bloomfield Turnpike Company".

Israel Crane eventually became the sole owner of the stock, and the sole operator of this toll road known as the Newark-Pompton Turnpike, which opened with four toll gates at Newark, Montclair, Pine Brook, and Singac. Because of his exclusive control of the turnpike, he was given the title "King Crane."

The "Newark and Bloomfield Turnpike" made the markets of Newark and New York accessible to the farms in the northern and western portions of New Jersey. With this improved transportation Bloomfield and Montclair became commercial centers, with taverns, wheelwrights, blacksmiths and wagon makers.

In 1870, the executors of Mr. Crane's estate sold the Turnpike to the Essex County Road Board. They widened, graded and macadamized the now public highway, and gave it the name of Bloomfield Avenue.

Between 1933 & 1935, the Newark-Pompton Turnpike was built into a four-lane undivided arterial to connect with U.S. Route 46 (US 46). This was the section north of US 46 in Wayne up to what is now the exit (Overpass) by the present NJ Transit Route 23 Park/Ride Lot. A new alignment of Route 23 then continued north, removing the state highway from the rest of the Newark-Pompton Turnpike (except for a short ½ mile stretch in Pompton Plains and Riverdale). The Highway continued on a new alignment north through Riverdale, Butler & Kinnelon, connecting to the Paterson-Hamburg Turnpike in what was once known as Smith's Mills in West Milford.

During the 1980s, Route 23 was upgraded from an outmoded arterial to a modern freeway with service roads.

== Major intersections ==
County	Location	mi	km	Destinations	Notes
Essex	Newark	0.00	0.00	CR 506 Spur (Bloomfield Avenue) / Broadway (CR 667 north)	Southern terminus
Essex	Bloomfield	2.03	3.27	CR 509 (Grove Street) to G.S. Parkway	
Essex	Glen Ridge	3.93	6.32	CR 506 (Bloomfield Avenue / Highland Avenue)	Western terminus of CR 506 Spur; route transitions onto CR 506 west
Essex	Verona	5.99	9.64	Route 23 north (Pompton Avenue) / CR 577 south (Mt. Prospect Avenue) – Little Falls	Southern terminus of Route 23; northern terminus of CR 577; route transitions onto Route 23 north
Essex	Cedar Grove	9.59	15.43	CR 527 south (Lindsley Road)	Northern terminus of CR 527
Passaic	Wayne	10.58	17.03	Hobson Avenue; Old Turnpike Road (CR 703 north)	Gap in designation from Route 23 to CR 703; route is connected via Hobson Avenue; route continues on CR 703 north; southern terminus of CR 703
Passaic	Wayne	11.08	17.83	I-80 / US 46 / Route 23 / CR 703	Gap in designation across I-80/US 46/Route 23 intersection; route continues on Route 23 north (no access to Route 23 north from CR 703); northern terminus of CR 703
Passaic	Wayne			Southern end of freeway section	
Passaic	Wayne	11.61	18.68	West Belt Road / Service Road	Cloverleaf interchange
Passaic	Wayne	12.42	19.99	US 202 south / CR 511 Alt. north – Lincoln Park, Boonton	Southern end of US 202 concurrency; southern terminus of CR 511 Alt.
Passaic	Wayne	12.81	20.62	Alps Road (CR 670 north)	Interchange; southern terminus of CR 670
Passaic	Wayne	12.81	20.62	Northern end of freeway section	
Passaic	Wayne	13.28	21.37	Newark-Pompton Turnpike (CR 683 north) – Pequannock Township	Interchange; southern terminus of CR 683; route transitions onto CR 683 north
Passaic	Wayne	14.75	23.74	CR 504 (Newark-Pompton Turnpike / Black Oak Ridge Road)	Northern terminus of CR 683; route transitions onto CR 504 west
Morris	Pequannock Township	15.85	25.51	Newark-Pompton Turnpike (CR 660 west)	Eastern terminus of CR 660; route transitions onto CR 660 west
Morris	Pequannock Township	17.65	28.40	Route 23	Western terminus of CR 660; route transitions onto Route 23 north
Morris	Pequannock Township	18.02	29.00	CR 511 Alt. south (Boulevard)	Southern end of CR 511 Alt. concurrency
Morris	Riverdale	18.23	29.34	CR 511 Alt. north (Newark-Pompton Turnpike)	Route onto CR 511 Alt. north
Morris	Riverdale	19.20	30.90	CR 694 west / CR 511 Alt. north (Paterson-Hamburg Turnpike) to I-287	Northern terminus
1.000 mi = 1.609 km; 1.000 km = 0.621 mi: Concurrency terminus; Route transition
