= New Jersey Route 59 =

State highway in Union County, New Jersey, US

Route 59
- Lincoln Avenue
- Alignment of Route 59 in red

Route information
- Maintained by NJDOT
- Length: 0.15 mi (240 m)
- Existed: 1953–present

Major junctions
- South end: CR 610 in Cranford
- North end: Route 28 on Cranford–Garwood line

Location
- Country: United States
- State: New Jersey
- Counties: Union

Highway system
- New Jersey State Highway Routes; Interstate; US; State; Scenic Byways
← Route 58	→ Route 60
← US 22	Route 22	→ Route 23

Route 59 is the shortest state highway in New Jersey, United States, at 0.15-mile (0.24 km) long. The route consists entirely of a short block of Lincoln Avenue from Union County Route 610 (known locally as South Avenue) in Cranford to New Jersey Route 28 (known locally as North Avenue) along the Cranford–Garwood border. The route functions as an underpass under the Raritan Valley Line of NJ Transit, under which it crosses about halfway down the block, along the municipal border. Route 59 was originally a proposed alignment of Route 22, which was supposed to head from an intersection with current day New Jersey Route 159 in Morris County at the Pine Brook Bridge before heading through several counties, terminating at an intersection with New Jersey Route 27 in Rahway. Most of the route was not constructed, and a portion in Garwood and Cranford was re-designated Route 59 in the 1953 New Jersey state highway renumbering on January 1, 1953.

== Route description ==
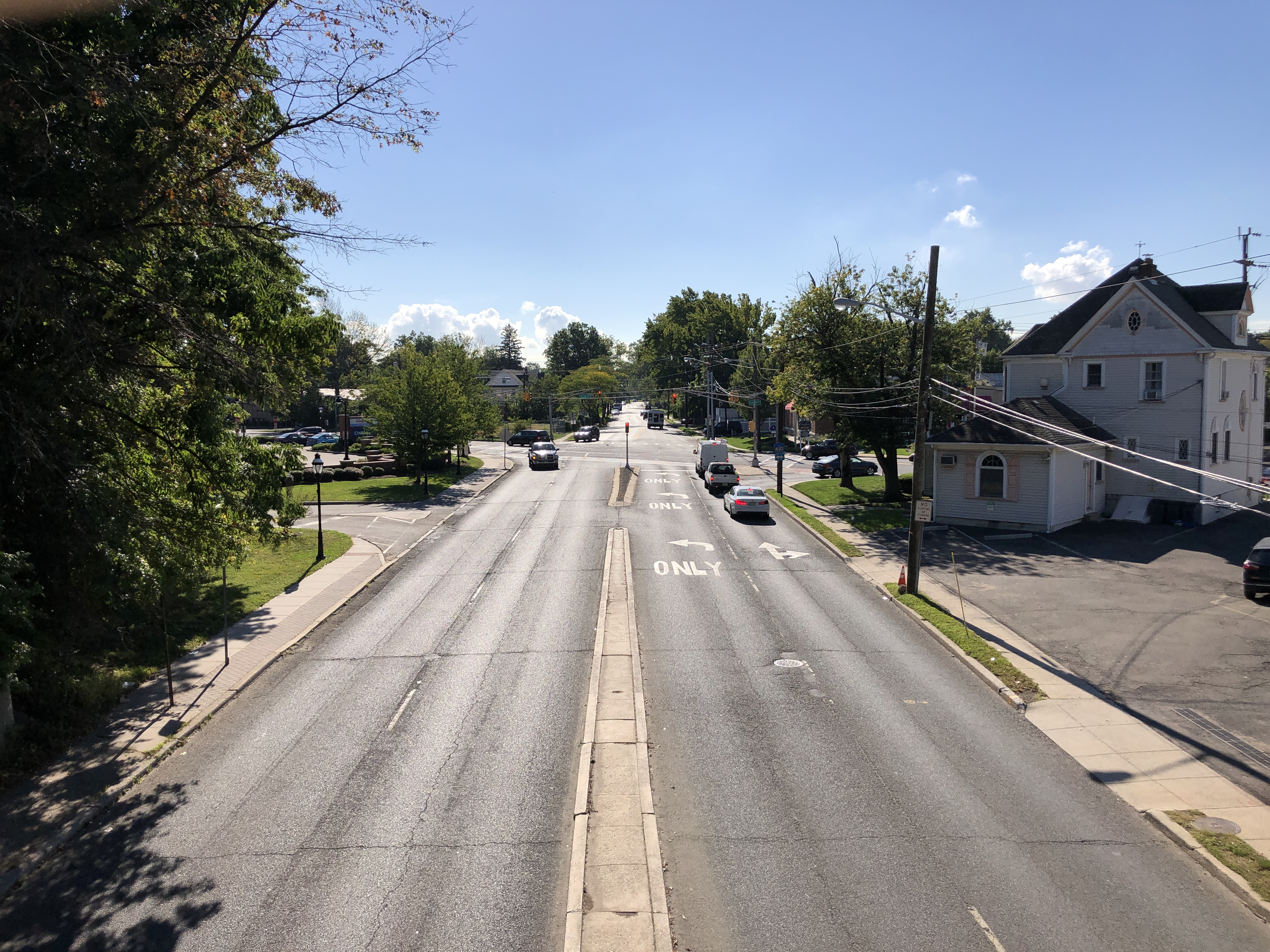
Route 59 southbound as seen from the Raritan Valley Line. The intersection with CR 610 is visible ahead

Route 59 begins at a four-way intersection with Union County Route 610 (CR 610; South Avenue) in the community of Cranford. Route 59 heads northwestward, passing a couple of businesses in both directions. The route crosses under the NJ Transit-owned Raritan Valley Line at which point the border of Cranford and Garwood runs along the center of the road. The route continues to the northwest, passing businesses before ending at a signalized T-intersection with Route 28 (North Avenue). The pavement ends at the intersection through a state-constructed bridge carrying the intersection over a small creek is angled such that a road could continue northwest. Throughout the entire length of the route, it is four lanes wide (two in each direction).

== History ==
Route 22
- Location: Cranford–Garwood
- Existed: 1927–1953

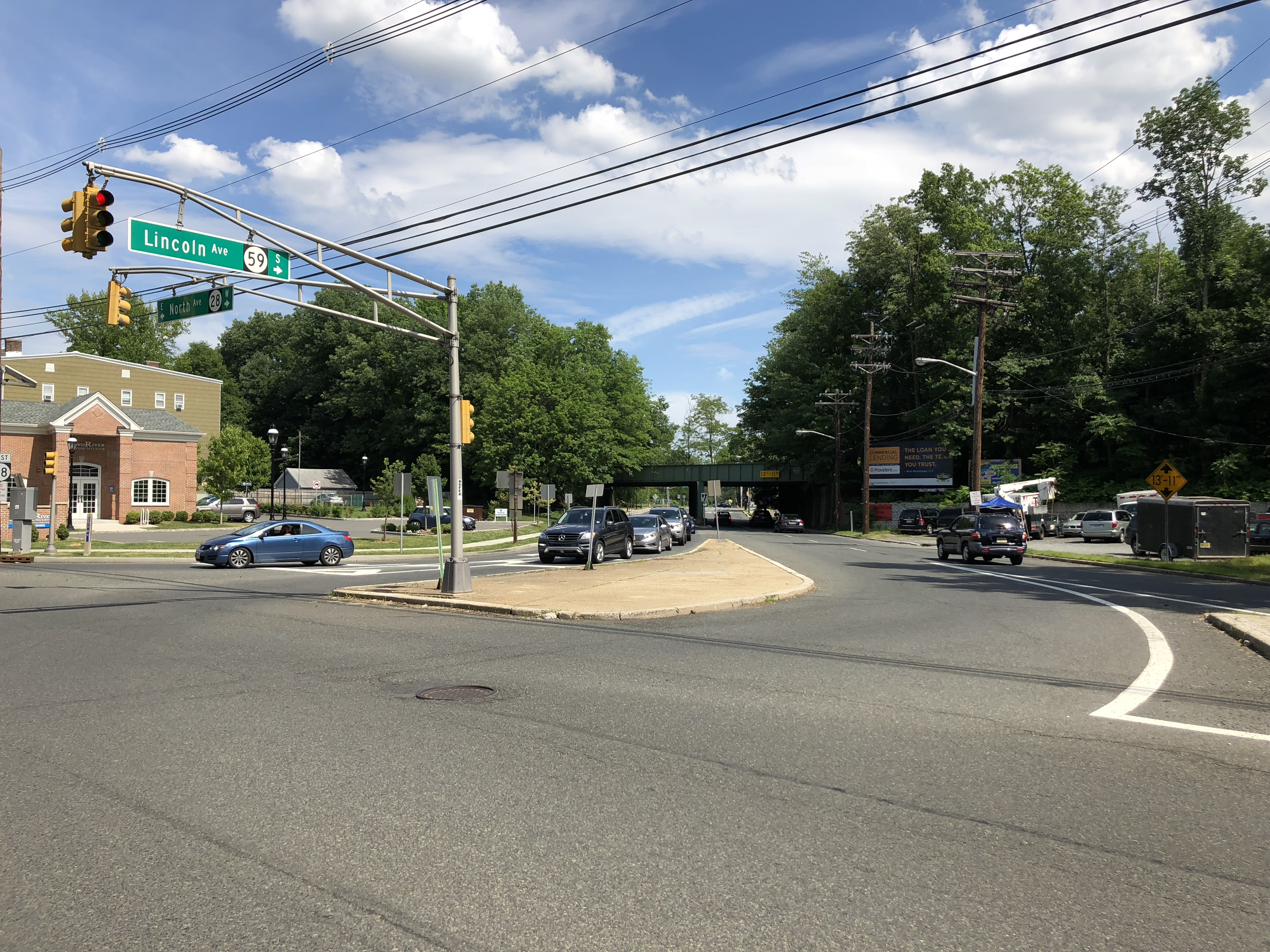
The intersection of Route 28 and Route 59 on the border of Garwood and Cranford, with overhead signage indicating Route 59's presence on Lincoln Avenue

The alignment of Route 59 was designated as part of the proposed State Highway Route 22 in the 1927 renumbering, which was proposed to run from the Pine Brook Bridge over the Passaic River at State Highway Route 6 in Fairfield Township. (This intersection is where New Jersey Route 159 currently crosses the bridge.) The route was to continue through parts of Morris, Essex and Union counties, including intersections with State Highway Route 10 at Livingston, U.S. Route 22 (also State Highway Route 29) at Mountainside, State Highway Route 28 at Garwood (where Routes 28 and 59 currently meet), and terminate in the community of Rahway at State Highway Route 27. Most of this route was not constructed, except a portion from State Highway Route 28 (North Avenue) in Cranford to South Avenue in Garwood. This portion was renumbered as Route 59 in the 1953 New Jersey state highway renumbering on January 1, 1953 so as not to duplicate U.S. Route 22.

== Major intersections ==
The entire route is in Union County.

Location	mi	km	Destinations	Notes
Cranford	0.00	0.00	CR 610 (South Avenue) / Lincoln Avenue	
Cranford–Garwood municipal line	0.15	0.24	Route 28 (North Avenue) – Westfield, Somerville, Cranford, Elizabeth	
1.000 mi = 1.609 km; 1.000 km = 0.621 mi
