= New Jersey Route 23 =

State highway in northern New Jersey, US

Route 23

Route information
- Maintained by NJDOT
- Length: 52.63 mi (84.70 km)
- Existed: 1927–present

Major junctions
- South end: CR 506 / CR 577 in Verona
- I-80 / US 46 in Wayne; US 202 in Wayne; I-287 in Riverdale; Route 94 in Hamburg; Route 284 in Sussex
- North end: I-84 / US 6 at the New York state line

Location
- Country: United States
- State: New Jersey
- Counties: Essex, Passaic, Morris, Sussex

Highway system
- New Jersey State Highway Routes; Interstate; US; State; Scenic Byways
← Route 22	→ Route 24

Route 23 is a state highway in the northern part of New Jersey, United States. The route runs 52.63 miles (84.70 km) from Bloomfield Avenue (County Route 506, CR 506) and Prospect Avenue (CR 577) in Verona, Essex County, northwest to the border with New York at Montague Township in Sussex County, where the road continues to Port Jervis, New York, as CR 15. Route 23 heads through Essex and Passaic counties as a two- to four-lane surface road and becomes a six-lane freeway at a complex interchange with U.S. Route 46 (US 46) and Interstate 80 (I-80) in Wayne. The freeway carries Route 23 north to run concurrently with US 202. Past the freeway portion, the route heads northwest along the border of Morris and Passaic counties as a four- to six-lane arterial road with a wide median at places, winding through mountainous areas and crossing the interchange with I-287 in Riverdale. The route continues northwest through Sussex County as a mostly two-lane surface road that passes through farmland and woodland as well as the communities of Franklin, Hamburg, and Sussex before reaching the New York state line, just south of an interchange with I-84 and US 6 in Port Jervis, in Montague Township near High Point State Park.

Route 23 was established in 1927 to run from Verona to the New York state line near Port Jervis, replacing pre-1927 Route 8 between Verona and Sussex. The route followed two turnpikes that were created in the early 19th century: the Newark–Pompton Turnpike and the Paterson–Hamburg Turnpike. In the mid-1950s, there were plans to build an Interstate Highway along Route 23 between I-80 and I-287, but it was never built. In the 1960s, the route was planned to be upgraded to a freeway all the way up to Port Jervis and south to Piscataway, Middlesex County; however, both freeway proposals were cancelled in the early 1970s. In the mid-1980s, the portion of Route 23 from north of US 46 in Wayne to I-287 in Riverdale was improved, with the road upgraded to a six-lane freeway south of the interchange with Alps Road and to a six-lane arterial road north of Alps Road.

== Route description ==
=== Essex and Passaic counties ===
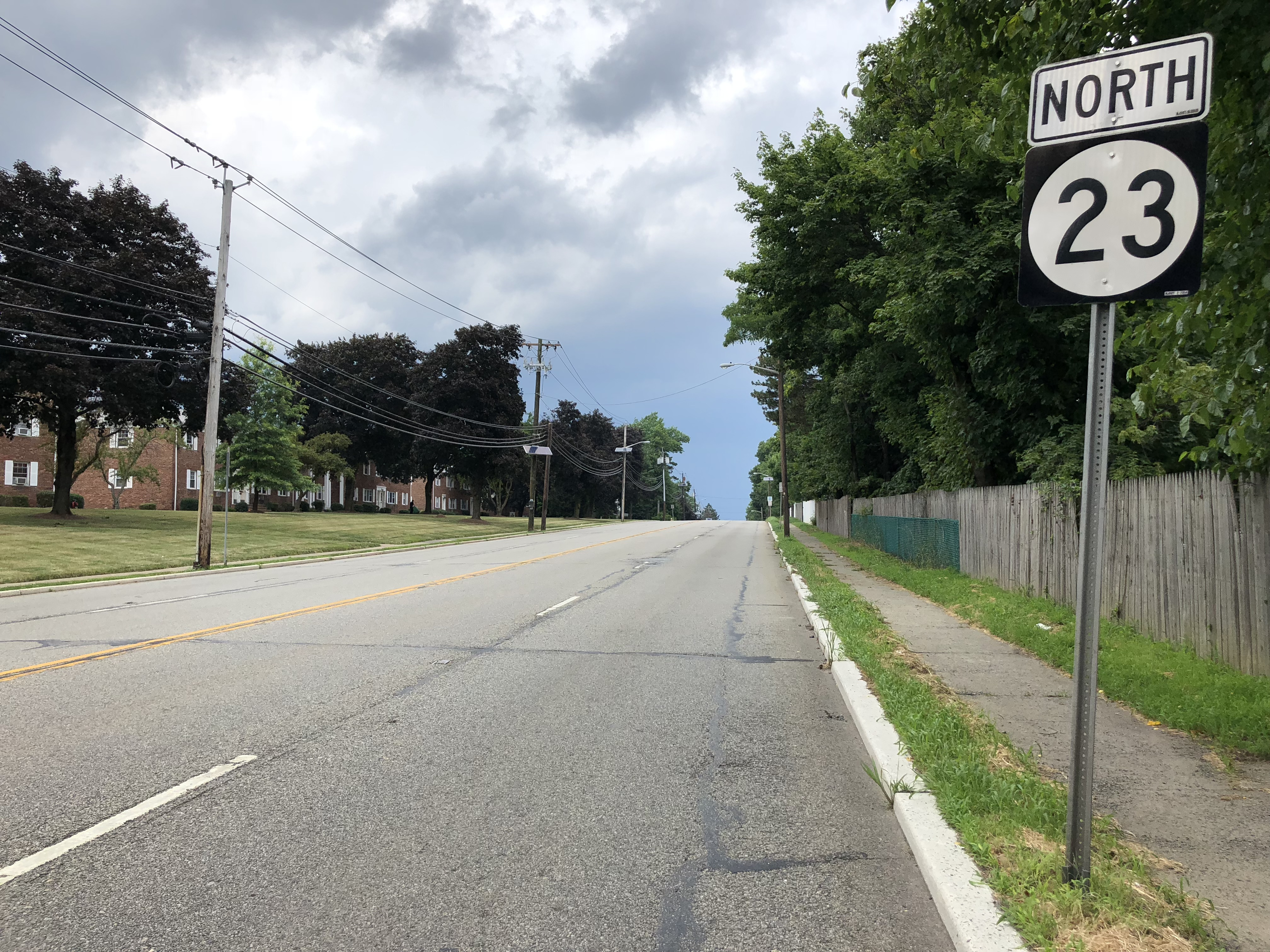
View north along Route 23 at Highland Road in Cedar Grove

Route 23 begins at an intersection with Bloomfield Avenue (CR 506) and Prospect Avenue (CR 577) in Verona, heading to the north through residences and some businesses along four-lane, undivided Pompton Avenue. After a short distance, the road forms the border between Cedar Grove to the west and Verona to the east before fully entering Cedar Grove. In Cedar Grove, the route narrows to two lanes at the intersection of West Bradford Avenue/East Bradford Avenue (CR 640) before widening to four lanes again at the intersection of Grove Avenue (CR 639). Shortly before leaving Cedar Grove, Route 23 crosses the intersection of Lindsley Road (CR 604), which also heads to the west as CR 527.

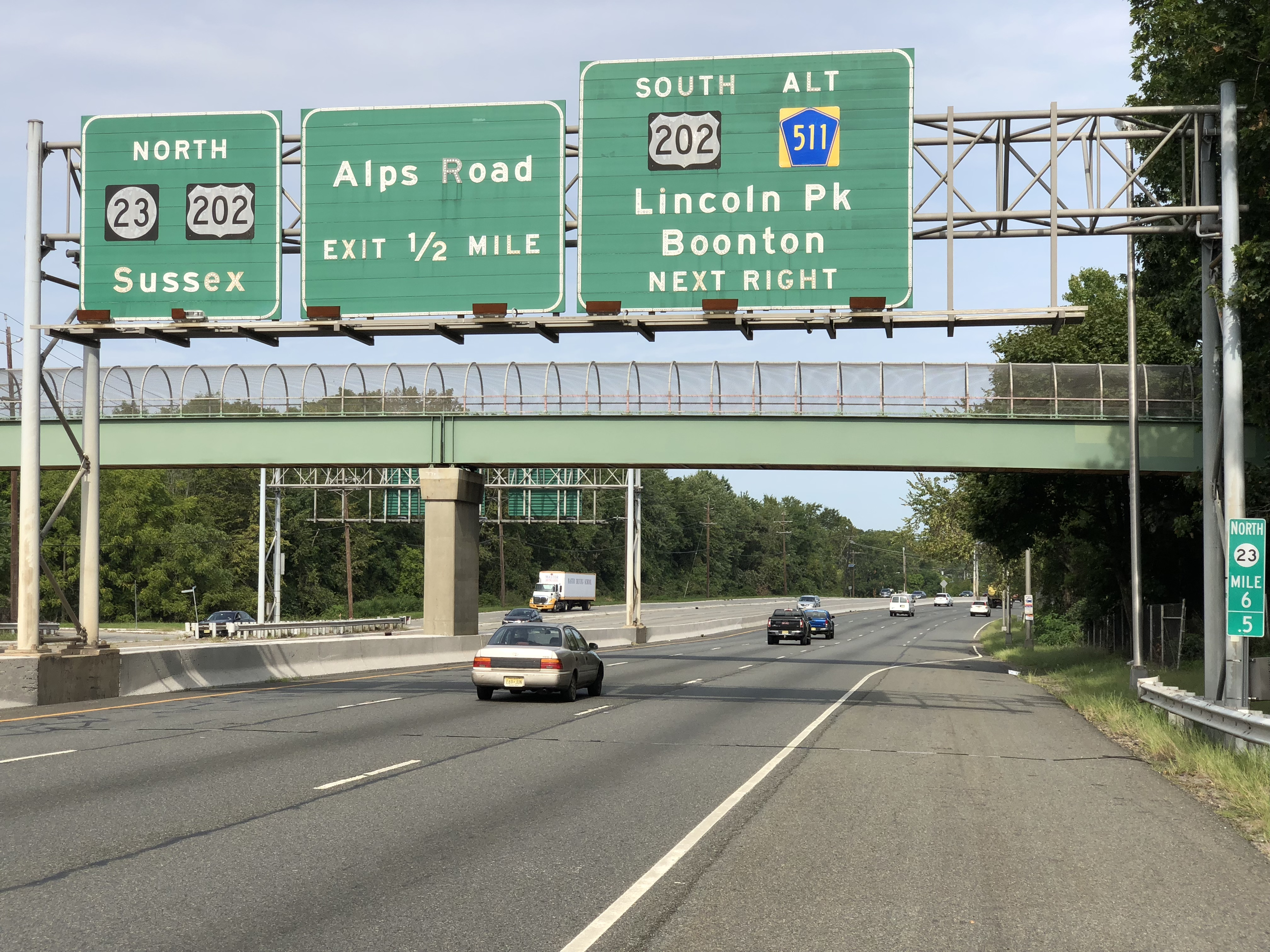
Route 23 freeway northbound in Wayne

The road crosses into Little Falls, Passaic County, where it narrows to two lanes and becomes Newark-Pompton Turnpike. In Little Falls, Route 23 heads through the central part of the community before crossing the Passaic River into Wayne where the road leaves the unnamed highway briefly and widens to a four lane divided highway. Route 23 passes two shopping malls, Willowbrook Mall and Wayne Towne Center, and enters the "Spaghetti Bowl" interchange with US 46 and I-80, becoming a six-lane freeway. Within this interchange, the route passes under NJ Transit's Montclair-Boonton Line.

North of I-80, the road rejoins the route unnamed, and features a cloverleaf interchange with West Belt Road that provides access to the Wayne Route 23 Transit Center along the Montclair-Boonton Line. Route 23 continues north with frontage roads serving businesses, coming to an interchange with US 202 and CR 511 Alternate (CR 511 Alt.), forming a concurrency with US 202. The road passes over a Norfolk Southern railroad line before it has an interchange with Alps Road (CR 670) and becomes a six-lane arterial road. Following this, the roadway passes west of the Mother's Park & Ride, a park and ride facility serving NJ Transit buses, and reaches an interchange with CR 683, where the Newark–Pompton Turnpike leaves Route 23 and US 202, which continue north from this point as a surface road through commercial areas. At a U-turn ramp, the eastbound direction of CR 504 follows both directions of the road, having to use the ramp in order to continue across the road. Northbound US 202 splits from Route 23, where the cut-off intersection with CR 504 is located. At this point, the westbound direction of CR 504 and the southbound direction of US 202 follow southbound Route 23 until an intersection.

=== Morris and Passaic counties ===
Route 23 crosses into Pequannock in Morris County and passes over the Pompton River. In Pequannock, the road is a six-lane arterial road with at-grade intersections, some controlled by jughandles, that heads through a mix of businesses and woodland. At the north end of Pequannock, the route passes over a New York, Susquehanna and Western Railway (NYSW) branch line and intersects with CR 660, where it rejoins Route 23. The route intersects with Boulevard (CR 511 Alt.) and crosses into Riverdale, and CR 511 Alt. follows Route 23 until it heads to the north unnamed. Route 23 interchanges with I-287 and climbs a hill past the interchange, heading to the west. The route runs through Kinnelon, passing over the NYSW New Jersey Subdivision line, before entering Butler. In Butler, Route 23 passes through commercial areas, crossing the intersection with Boonton Avenue (CR 511) before heading northwest. The road drops to four lanes, still divided by a Jersey barrier. It heads under Maple Lake Road before passing through Kinnelon again. Upon leaving Kinnelon, the route enters West Milford in Passaic County at the crossing of the Pequannock River. At this point, the route enters a more wooded, mountainous setting, following the Pequannock River and the NYSW line.

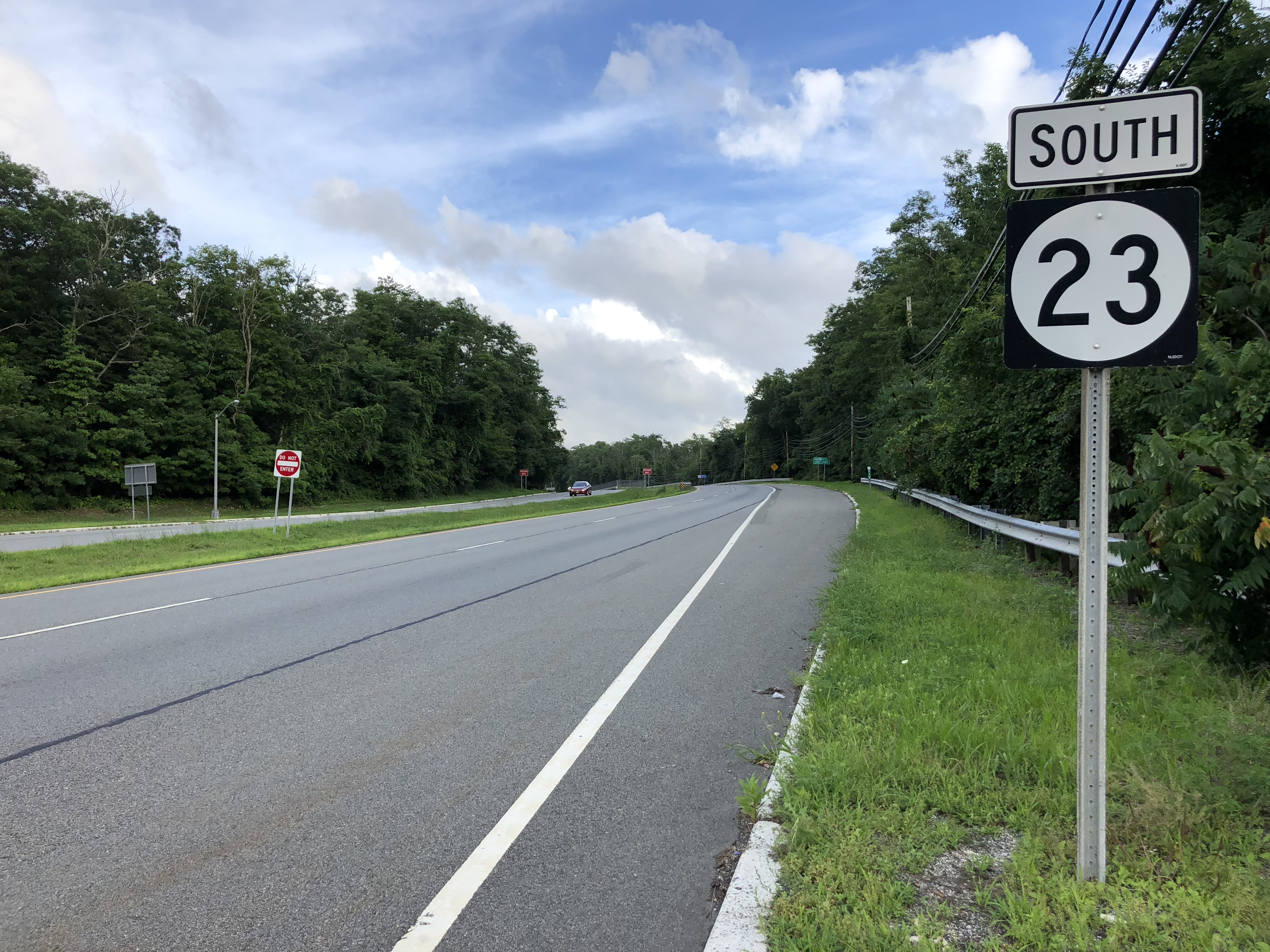
Route 23 southbound past Reservoir Road in West Milford

Route 23 splits, with the southbound lanes crossing over the Pequannock River into Kinnelon for a time. The route passes by the Charlotteburg Reservoir, a reservoir for the Newark public water supply, and has a rest area in the northbound direction. Route 23 intersects Union Valley Road (CR 513), running concurrently with that route. The southbound lanes cross the Pequannock River into Jefferson Township, Morris County, and CR 513 splits from Route 23 by heading south on Green Pond Road. The southbound lanes cross back into West Milford, where the two separate roads rejoin. Route 23 continues northwest through forested areas, crossing over the railroad tracks and passing by the Oak Ridge Reservoir, another reservoir that provides water for Newark. The route crosses the Pequannock River three times, running within Jefferson Township between the first two crossings and past the third crossing.

=== Sussex County ===
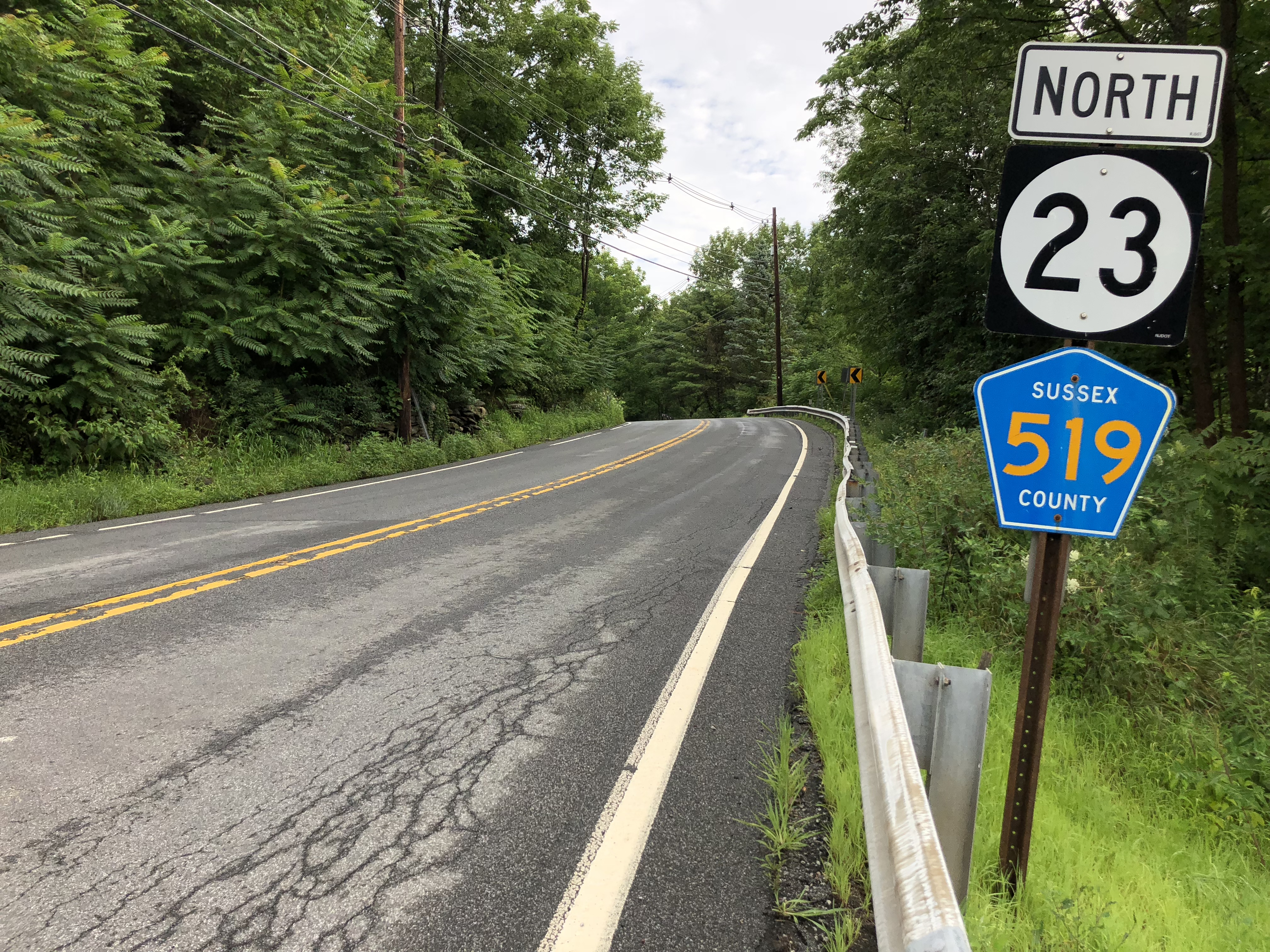
Route 23 northbound along its concurrency with CR 519 in Wantage Township

Route 23 enters Hardyston Township, Sussex County, and comes to an intersection with CR 515. Past this intersection, the divided highway ends and Route 23 becomes a two-lane, undivided road. The road heads to the northwest through wooded mountains and runs through the community of Stockholm, where it passes east of a park and ride lot located at a church. The route curves west onto a winding road, passing over the New York, Susquehanna and Western Railway line. The roadway gains a wide painted median, crossing into Franklin and meeting the intersection with Munsonhurst Road (CR 517). CR 517 heads north along with Route 23, with the wide median ending, and the road continues through residential and commercial areas of Franklin with a brief wide painted median near the intersection of Franklin Avenue (CR 631). The road crosses a stream, Mill Brook, into Hamburg, where CR 517 splits from Route 23 by heading east on Quarry Road. Route 23 continues north through wooded residential areas of Hamburg, passing under the NYSW line and crossing the intersection of Route 94. The route crosses back into Hardyston Township, heading north through a mix of farms and forests.

Route 23 crosses the Wallkill River into Wantage Township and continues north to an intersection with Glenwood Road (CR 565), running concurrently with that route and gaining a wide painted median past that intersection which eventually turns into a center left-turn lane. The road passes some businesses and becomes a two-lane divided highway before CR 565 departs from Route 23 by heading west on Lewisburg Road. Route 23 crosses into Sussex, where the route becomes a one-way pair along Hamburg Avenue northbound and Walling Avenue southbound, passing by residences. The route intersects with East Main Street (Route 284) before the northbound directions turns left onto Loomis Avenue, where CR 643 continues north on Main Street. Immediately after turning onto Loomis Avenue, CR 639 continues west on Loomis Avenue and Route 23 becomes two-way again, heading north on two-lane undivided Mill Street. The route becomes Clove Avenue before crossing back into Wantage Township.

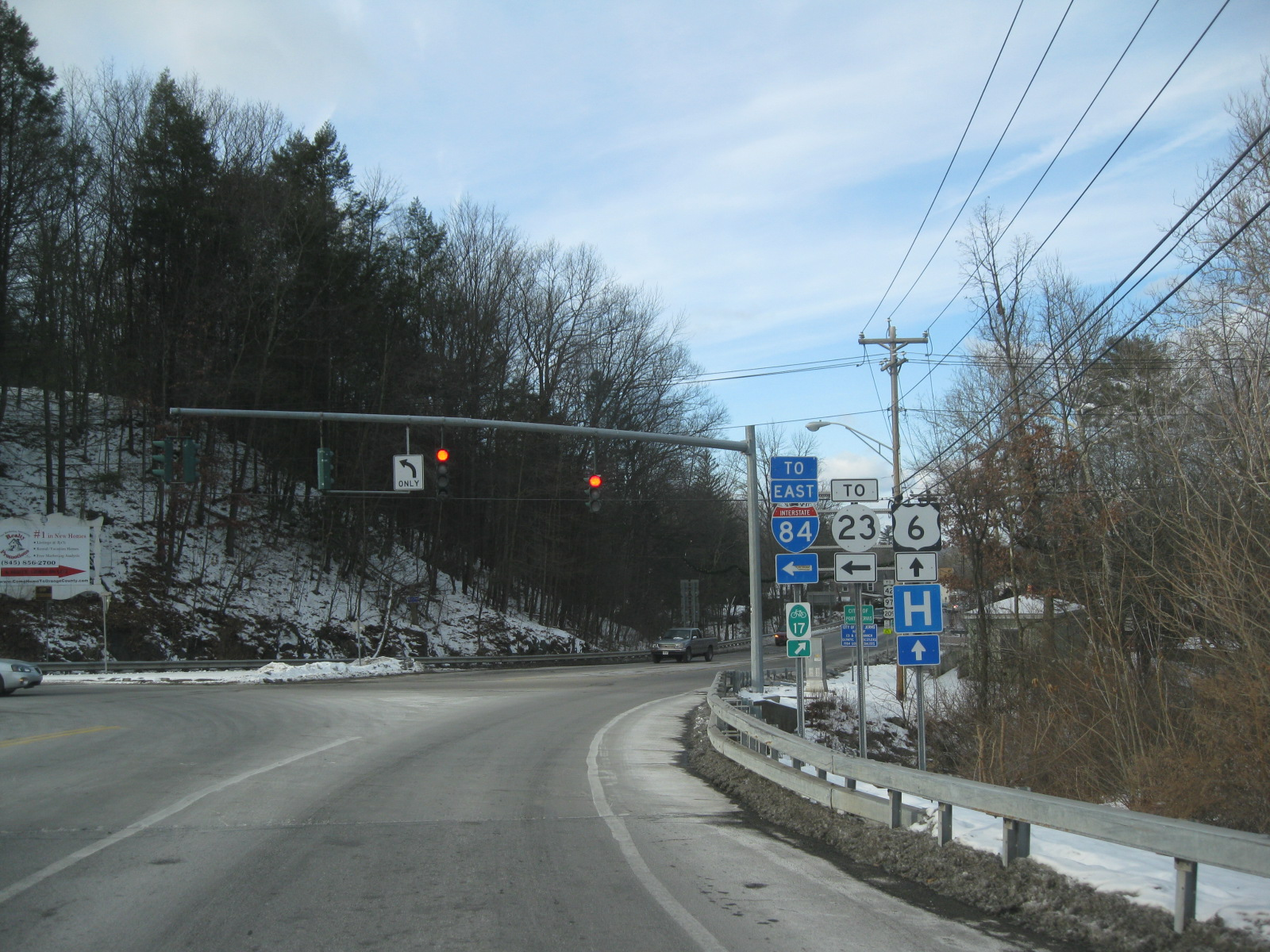
Mismarked cutout signage for CR 15 for Route 23 from US 6

In Wantage Township, Route 23 continues north through farmland and woodland, eventually turning west. It comes to an intersection with Colesville–Lusscroft Road (CR 519) and turns north, running concurrently with that route through forested areas until CR 519 heads north on Greenville Road. Route 23 continues northwest and heads across the Kittatinny Mountain, crossing the Appalachian Trail and entering Montague Township, Here, the road heads into heavily forested High Point State Park, which is home to the highest elevation in New Jersey. The route descends through Montague Township along a winding road, passing by some businesses immediately before heading to the New York state line. Route 23 officially ends at the state line and the road continues into Orange County, New York, as Tappen Road (CR 15) for less than 1/2 mile (0.80 km). A few feet after the state line, CR 15 comes to an interchange with I-84 before it ends at an intersection with US 6 in Port Jervis. Although I-84 does not enter New Jersey, missing it by only a few feet, the signs on it for the interchange with CR 15 refer to Route 23, even though some signs erroneously refer to it as NY 23.

== History ==
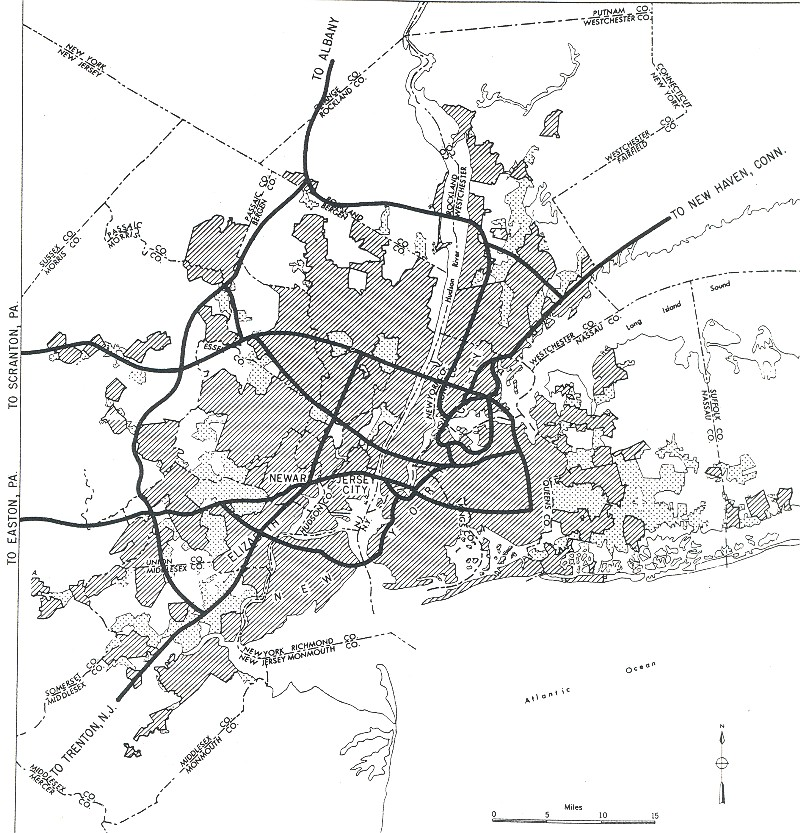
1955 Yellow Book map of New York City, showing a planned Interstate Highway along part of the Route 23 corridor

Route 23 follows the course of the Pompton Trail, and old Lenape trail connecting what is now Glen Ridge, New Jersey to the Minisink Village in what is now Montague. In the 19th century, two turnpikes were incorporated that would later become parts of Route 23: the Newark–Pompton Turnpike, which was built between 1806 and 1811; and the Paterson–Hamburg Turnpike, which was incorporated in 1806, and was built from Paterson to a landing in Montague Township, where the Owego and Milford Turnpike continued its route west. Parts of the Paterson–Hamburg Turnpike are now CR 650 in Sussex County, the Hamburg Turnpike from Butler to Wayne (signed CR 694, CR 689, and CR 504), Central Avenue through Haledon, and into Paterson as Broadway. Due to realignments, the current alignment of Route 23 bypasses the intersection of these two turnpikes. North of Coleville, the road was maintained by the Coleville and Carpenter's Point Turnpike, chartered in 1850.

In the original system of New Jersey highways, the Newark–Pompton Turnpike and Paterson–Hamburg Turnpike were combined to form pre-1927 Route 8, which ran from Montclair to the New York state line near Unionville, New York, running along the alignment of current Route 23 north to Sussex and following present-day Route 284 north of Sussex. In the 1927 New Jersey State Highway renumbering, Route 23 was designated to run from Route 9 (now CR 506) in Verona north to the New York state line near Port Jervis, replacing pre-1927 Route 8 from Verona to Sussex. In the 1930s, communities in Passaic and Morris counties were bypassed by four-lane roads, with Bloomingdale and Butler bypassed in 1933, and Pequannock by 1936.

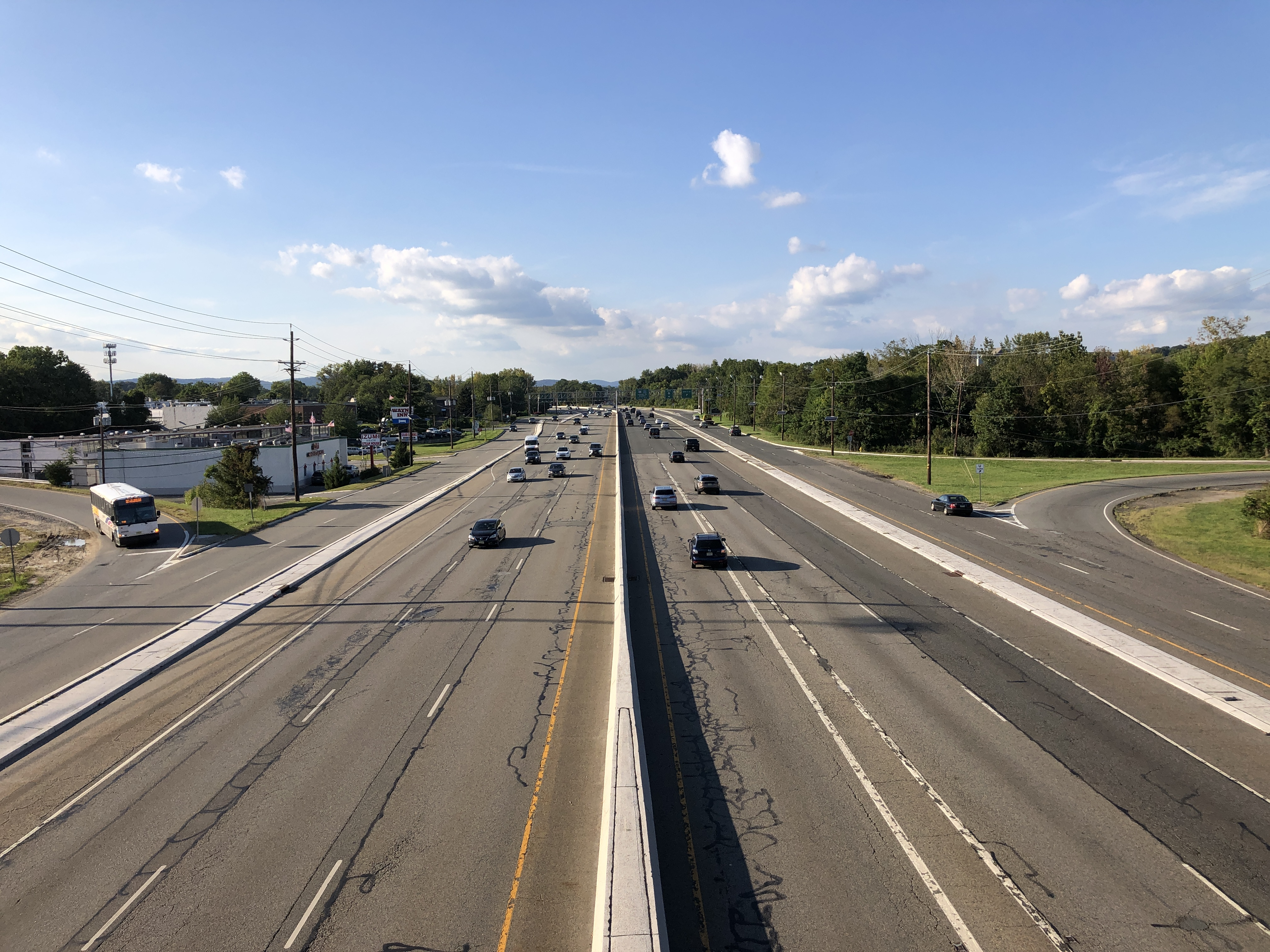
Route 23 northbound at West Belt Road in Wayne

In the 1955 plan for the Interstate Highway System, an Interstate Highway was planned along the Route 23 corridor between I-80 in Wayne and I-287 in Riverdale, also connecting to a proposed Interstate along the Route 3 corridor. However, this proposed Interstate was never built. Plans were made in the early 1960s for a Route 23 freeway running from I-80 north to I-84 in Port Jervis, New York, providing improved freeway access to northwestern New Jersey. This proposed freeway, which was to cost $120 million, was cancelled in the early 1970s due to financial troubles and feared environmental issues. A 1966 proposal called for Route 23 to be extended south as a freeway to I-287 in Piscataway in Middlesex County, running parallel to the Garden State Parkway. This $300 million freeway was added to planning maps in 1969 as Route 807 but was also cancelled in the early 1970s.

In the late 1970s, the New Jersey Department of Transportation (NJDOT) made plans to rebuild the section of Route 23, at the time a four-lane undivided road, between I-80 and I-287 to a six-lane freeway between I-80 and Alps Road and a six-lane surface road north of Alps Road. Construction on these improvements began in 1983 and were completed in 1986. With these improvements to the route, many traffic circles were removed, including one at US 46 that was replaced with a complex interchange. In 2008, the Spaghetti Bowl interchange with I-80 and US 46 was improved, costing $70 million.

In 2010, NJDOT began plans to move Route 23 to a new alignment through Sussex. With this project, the bridge over the Papakating Creek was replaced and a new road for the southbound lanes was built as an extension of Walling Avenue, while the original Route 23 became northbound only. The project lasted from July 2012 to November 2014.

== Major intersections ==
County	Location	mi	km	Destinations	Notes
Essex	Verona	0.00	0.00	CR 506 (Bloomfield Avenue) / CR 577 south (Prospect Avenue) – Montclair, Livingston	Southern terminus; northern terminus of CR 577
Essex	Cedar Grove	3.60	5.79	CR 527 south (Lindsley Road)	Northern terminus of CR 527
Passaic	Wayne	5.25	8.45	Southern end of freeway section	
Passaic	Wayne	5.25	8.45	US 46 – Fairfield	
Passaic	Wayne	5.48	8.82	I-80 – New York, Delaware Water Gap	No southbound access to I-80 west; exit 53 on I-80
Passaic	Wayne	6.01	9.67	West Belt / Service Road – Local Traffic	
Passaic	Wayne	6.82	10.98	US 202 south / CR 511 Alt. / Service Road – Lincoln Park, Boonton	Southern end of US 202 concurrency
Passaic	Wayne	7.21	11.60	Alps Road (CR 670 north)	
Passaic	Wayne	7.21	11.60	Northern end of freeway section	
Passaic	Wayne	7.68	12.36	Newark-Pompton Turnpike (CR 683 north) – Pequannock	Interchange
Passaic	Wayne	8.94	14.39	US 202 north / CR 504 (Black Oak Ridge Road)	Northern end of US 202 concurrency
Morris	Pequannock Township	11.90	19.15	Newark-Pompton Turnpike (CR 683) – Pequannock	
Morris	Pequannock Township	12.27	19.75	CR 511 Alt. south (Boulevard) – Pompton Plains, Lincoln Park	Southern end of CR 511 Alt. concurrency
Morris	Riverdale	12.48	20.08	CR 511 Alt. north (Newark–Pompton Turnpike); Windbeam Road	Northern end of CR 511 Alt. concurrency
Morris	Riverdale	12.86	20.70	I-287 to CR 694 – Mahwah, Morristown	Exit 52 on I-287
Morris	Butler	14.98	24.11	CR 511 (Boonton Avenue) – Kinnelon, Boonton, Butler	
Passaic	West Milford	21.84	35.15	CR 513 north (Union Valley Road) – West Milford, Greenwood Lake	Southern end of CR 513 concurrency
Morris	Jefferson Township	22.09	35.55	CR 513 south (Green Pond Road) – Green Pond	North end of CR 513 overall
Sussex	Hardyston Township	26.87	43.24	CR 515 north – Highland Lakes, Vernon	Southern terminus of CR 515
Sussex	Franklin	31.64	50.92	CR 517 south (Munsonhurst Road) – Ogdensburg, Sparta	Southern end of CR 517 concurrency
Sussex	Hamburg	34.35	55.28	CR 517 north (Quarry Road)	Northern end of CR 517 concurrency
Sussex	Hamburg	35.45	57.05	Route 94 – Newton, McAfee, Great Gorge, Vernon	
Sussex	Wantage Township	38.52	61.99	CR 565 north (Glenwood Road) – Vernon; Clark Road	Southern end of CR 565 concurrency
Sussex	Wantage Township	39.18	63.05	CR 565 south (Lewisburg Road) – Frankford	Northern end of CR 565 concurrency
Sussex	Sussex	39.95	64.29	Route 284 north (East Main Street) – Unionville, Middletown	Southern terminus of Route 284
Sussex	Wantage Township	45.04	72.48	CR 519 south (Colesville–Lusscroft Road) – Frankford, Beemerville	Southern end of CR 519 concurrency
Sussex	Wantage Township	47.26	76.06	CR 519 north (Greenville Road) – Greenville	Northern end of CR 519 concurrency
Sussex	Montague Township	52.63	84.70	I-84 / US 6 – Port Jervis, Middletown, Scranton	Northern terminus; New York state line; access via CR 15; exit 1 on I-84
1.000 mi = 1.609 km; 1.000 km = 0.621 mi: Concurrency terminus

== See also ==
- List of county routes in Orange County, New York
