= County Route 506 (New Jersey) =

County highway in New Jersey, U.S.

County Route 506
- CR 506 highlighted in red, and CR 506 Spur in pink

Route information
- Length: 10.78 mi (17.35 km)

Major junctions
- West end: Route 159 in Fairfield
- CR 527 in Caldwell; Route 23 / CR 577 in Verona; CR 509 in Bloomfield; G.S. Parkway in Bloomfield; Route 7 in Belleville
- East end: Route 7 in Belleville

Location
- Country: United States
- State: New Jersey
- Counties: Essex

Highway system
- County routes in New Jersey; 500-series routes
← CR 505	→ CR 507
← US 9	→ US 9W

County Route 506 (CR 506) is a county highway in the U.S. state of New Jersey. The highway extends 10.78 miles (17.35 km) from Route 159 (Oak Road) in Fairfield to the Passaic River in Belleville.

== Route description ==
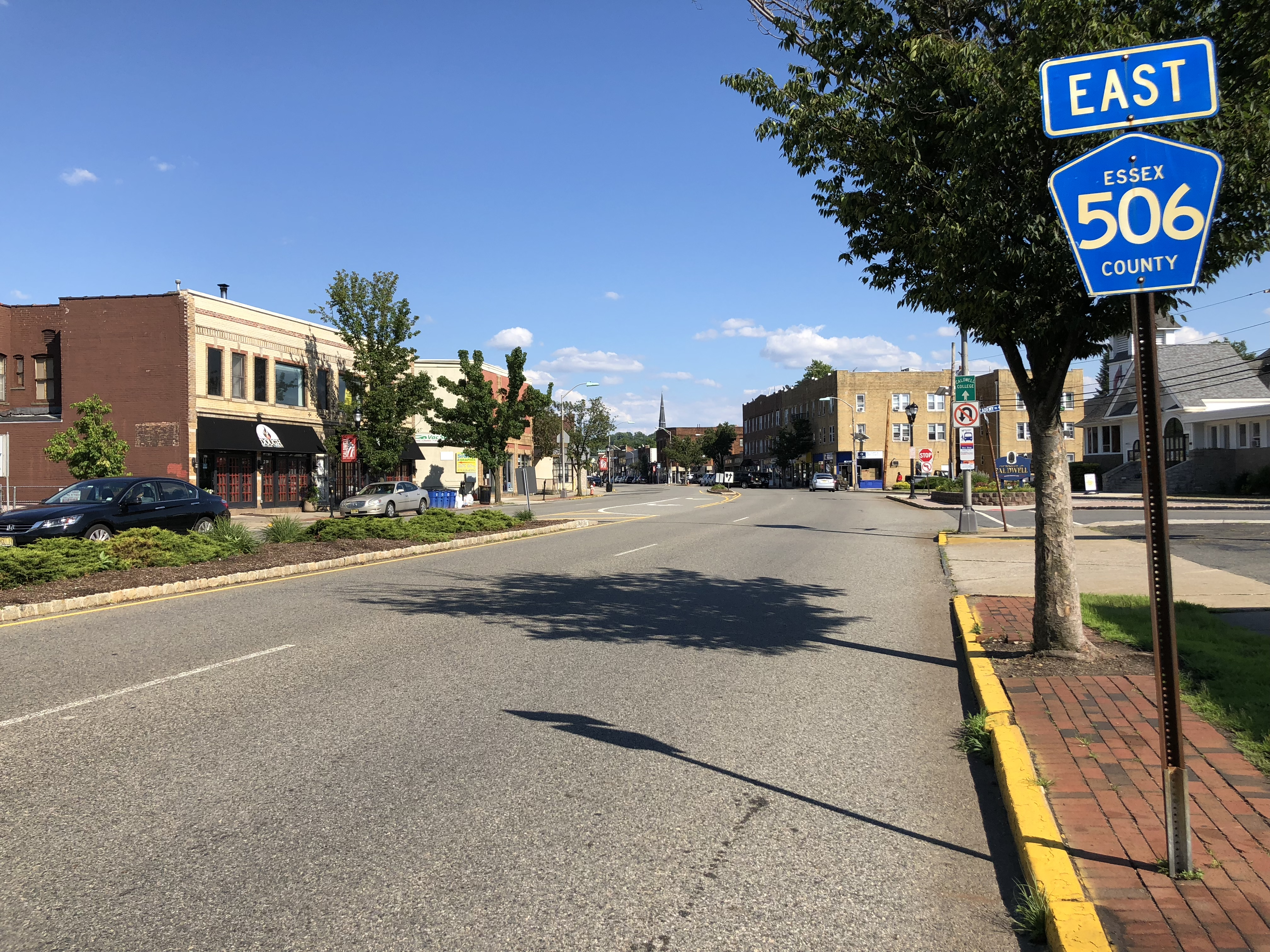
View east along CR 506 at Central Avenue (CR 631) in Caldwell

CR 506 begins at an intersection with Route 159 in Fairfield Township. The route heads east-southeast as a four-lane divided highway called Bloomfield Avenue, which becomes an undivided road by the first intersection. Just after crossing the town line into West Caldwell, CR 506 becomes a divided highway again, and intersects with local roads as it passes suburban areas of homes and businesses. After the intersection with Distler Avenue, the road briefly becomes undivided. Becoming a divided highway, the route crosses over CR 613 Spur and CR 613. The divided highway ends again as CR 506 turns more to the southeast before coming to CR 633. Prior to this intersection, the road is a divided highway. Following this intersection, the route briefly forms the border between Caldwell to the south and West Caldwell to the north before fully entering Caldwell. In Caldwell, CR 506 heads southeast into the commercial downtown and intersects CR 631 before meeting CR 527. At this point, CR 527 forms a concurrency with CR 506 and the road makes a turn to the east out of the downtown through more commercial development. The two routes split before CR 506 enters North Caldwell. The road briefly runs through North Caldwell, intersection CR 673 before it comes into Verona. In Verona, the road passes more businesses and has junctions with CR 637, CR 639, and CR 636. Before leaving Verona, Route 23 heads north from the northern terminus of CR 577 at CR 506. After this intersection, CR 506 continues into Montclair and makes a turn to the south into residential areas. After a curve to the southeast, the route enters downtown Montclair and intersects CR 621 and CR 623/CR 668. The road crosses New Jersey Transit's Montclair-Boonton Line near the Bay Street station before coming into Glen Ridge. In Glen Ridge, CR 506 splits from Bloomfield Avenue, which continues southeast as CR 506 Spur.

At this point, CR 506 turns north onto Highland Avenue briefly before turning east onto Belleville Avenue. The road passes through wooded residential areas, intersecting CR 653 before crossing into Bloomfield. Here, the route passes homes and businesses, crossing CR 509 and CR 652. After this, the road comes to a partial interchange with the Garden State Parkway that provides access to and from the northbound direction of the parkway. Following this interchange, CR 506 passes more development as it heads into Belleville. In Belleville, the road passes homes and parkland, crossing CR 645. Entering more dense neighborhoods, CR 506 reaches Route 7, and turns north to run concurrent with that route, passing businesses. A block later, CR 506 splits from Route 7 by heading east on Rutgers Street. After passing some commercial establishments and crossing Norfolk Southern's Newark Industrial Track line, CR 506 ends underneath the Route 21 freeway, where it continues as a separate segment of Route 7, heading over the Passaic River on the Rutgers Street Bridge.

== History ==
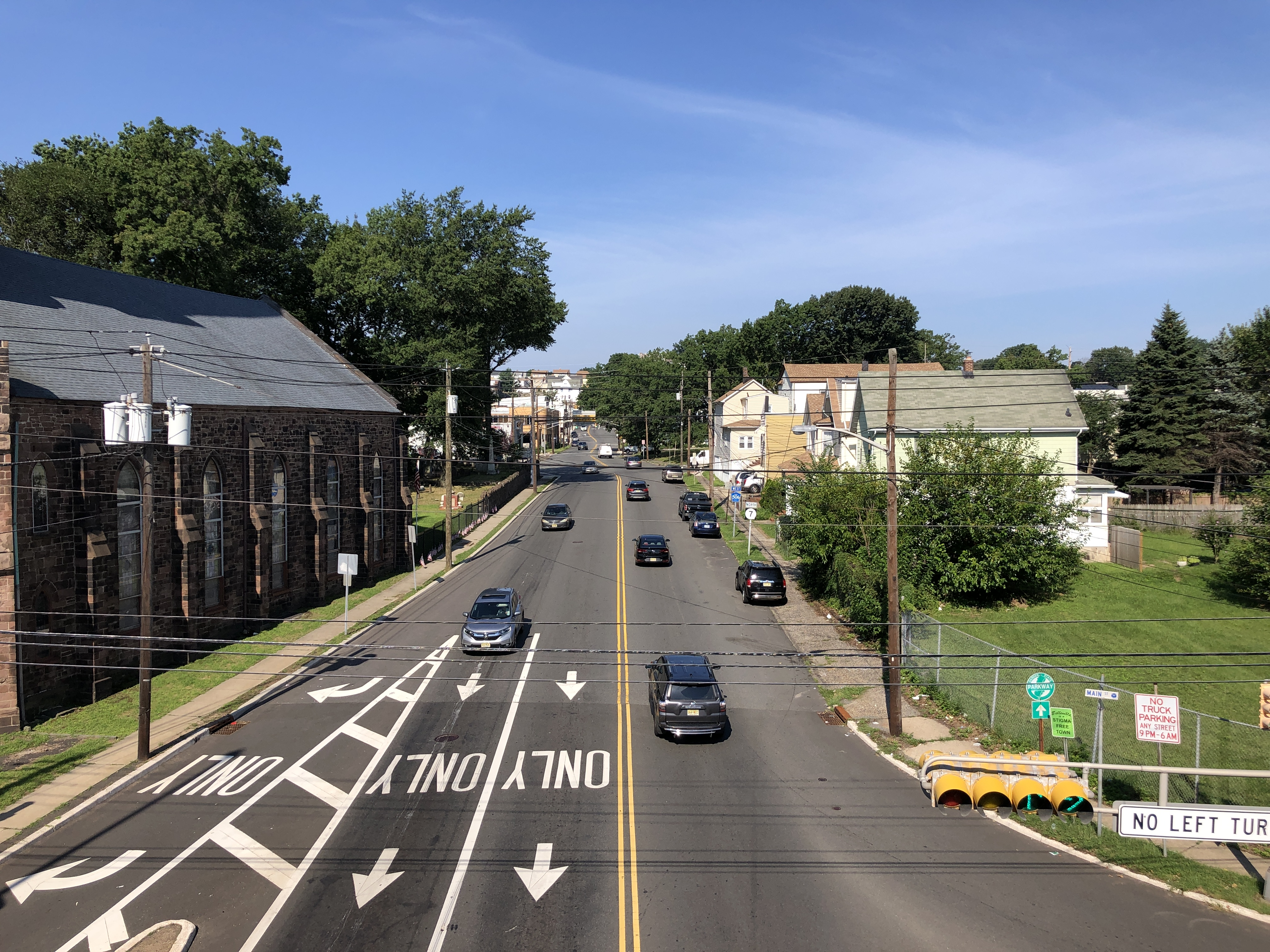
CR 506 westbound viewed from Route 21 in Belleville

Route 9 (former designation)

Bloomfield Avenue was constructed under the Newark and Pompton Turnpike Company, which was legislated to run from Newark to Pompton with a spur to Pine Brook. The current alignment of County Route 506 was legislated as part of Route 9 in the 1927 New Jersey state highway renumbering, which was to run from Pine Brook southeast to Belleville. Route 9 was eventually removed from the state highway system, and when the 500-series county routes were created in 1952, County Route 506 was designated to run from Route 6/U.S. Route 46 (now Route 159) in Fairfield to U.S. Route 1/9 Truck in Jersey City, following Route 7 between Belleville and Jersey City. Route 9 became Route 16 in the 1953 renumbering, but was never built as a state highway. Eventually, County Route 506 was removed from the portion of road that ran concurrent with Route 7, ending at Route 7 and Route 21 in Belleville instead.

In 2009, as part of the American Recovery and Reinvestment Act, work started on the improved bus service on Bloomfield Avenue in Bloomfield and Newark. The $2 million project includes new bus shelters, signaling priority, and express bus service to Newark Liberty International Airport and Downtown Newark.

== Major intersections ==
The entire route is in Essex County.

Location	mi	km	Destinations	Notes
Fairfield Township	0.00	0.00	Route 159 (Oak Road)	Western terminus
Caldwell	2.63	4.23	CR 527 south (Roseland Avenue)	Western end of CR 527 concurrency
Caldwell	3.26	5.25	CR 527 north (Mountain Avenue)	Eastern end of CR 527 concurrency
Verona Township	5.22	8.40	Route 23 north (Pompton Avenue) / CR 577 south (Mt. Prospect Avenue) – Little Falls	Southern terminus of Route 23; northern terminus of CR 577
Glen Ridge	7.28	11.72	CR 506 Spur east (Bloomfield Avenue) – Newark	Western terminus of CR 506 Spur
Bloomfield	7.93	12.76	CR 509 (Broad Street) to G.S. Parkway south	
Bloomfield	8.32	13.39	G.S. Parkway north	Exit 149 on G.S. Parkway
Belleville	10.43	16.79	Route 7 south (Washington Avenue) to N.J. Turnpike (I-95 Toll)	Western end of Route 7 concurrency
Belleville	10.52	16.93	Route 7 north (Washington Avenue) – Nutley	Eastern end of Route 7 concurrency
Belleville	10.78	17.35	Route 7 east (Belleville Turnpike)	Continuation east
1.000 mi = 1.609 km; 1.000 km = 0.621 mi: Concurrency terminus

== Special routes ==
County Route 506 Spur
- Location: Glen Ridge - Newark
- Length: 4.30 mi (6.92 km)

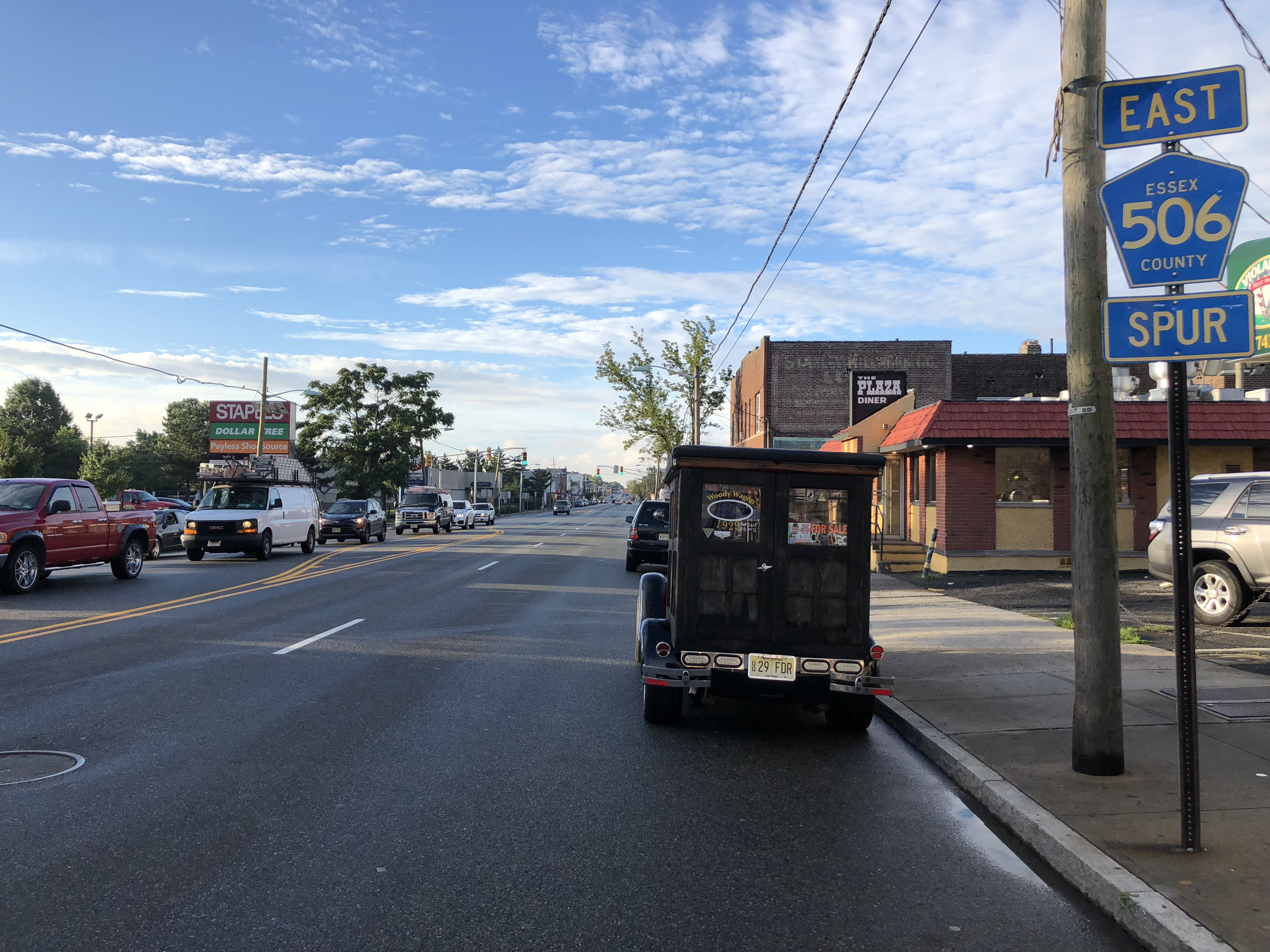
View east along CR 506 Spur at CR 509 in Bloomfield

County Route 506 Spur is an extension of CR 506, located entirely in Essex County. The route is the continuation of Bloomfield Avenue, and extends 4.30 miles (6.92 kilometers) from Highland Avenue in Glen Ridge to McCarter Highway (Route 21) in Newark.

Major intersections
The entire route is in Essex County.

Location	mi	km	Destinations	Notes
Glen Ridge	0.00	0.00	CR 506 (Bloomfield Avenue / Highland Avenue)	Western terminus
Bloomfield	1.90	3.06	CR 509 (Grove Street) to G.S. Parkway	
Newark	3.93	6.32	Broadway (CR 667 north)	
Newark	4.30	6.92	Route 21 (McCarter Highway) to N.J. Turnpike (I-95 Toll)	Eastern terminus
1.000 mi = 1.609 km; 1.000 km = 0.621 mi
