= New Jersey Route 8 (pre-1927) =

Pre-1927 Route 8 was a route in New Jersey that ran from Montclair north to the New York border near Unionville, New York, existing between 1916 and 1927. Today, it is part of the following routes:

- New Jersey Route 23
- New Jersey Route 284
- Newark-Pompton Turnpike
