= New Jersey Route 284 =

State highway in Sussex County, New Jersey, United States

Route 284
- Route 284 highlighted in red

Route information
- Maintained by NJDOT
- Length: 7.03 mi (11.31 km)
- Existed: 1966–present

Major junctions
- South end: Route 23 in Sussex
- North end: NY 284 at the New York state line in Unionville, NY

Location
- Country: United States
- State: New Jersey
- Counties: Sussex

Highway system
- New Jersey State Highway Routes; Interstate; US; State; Scenic Byways
| ← I-280 | → I-287 |
| ← Route 83 | Route 84 | → Route 85 |

Route 284 is a 7.03-mile (11.31 km) state highway in New Jersey, United States, running from Route 23 in Sussex north to the New York state line in Wantage Township. From there, New York State Route 284 (NY 284) continues north to U.S. Route 6 (US 6) at Slate Hill. The route is a connector to Unionville, and intersects with an old alignment of its original designation, Route 84. Route 284 was first a part of Route 8 in the 1920s, becoming Route 8N in 1927 and Route 84 in 1942 before being assigned its current number in 1966.

== Route description ==
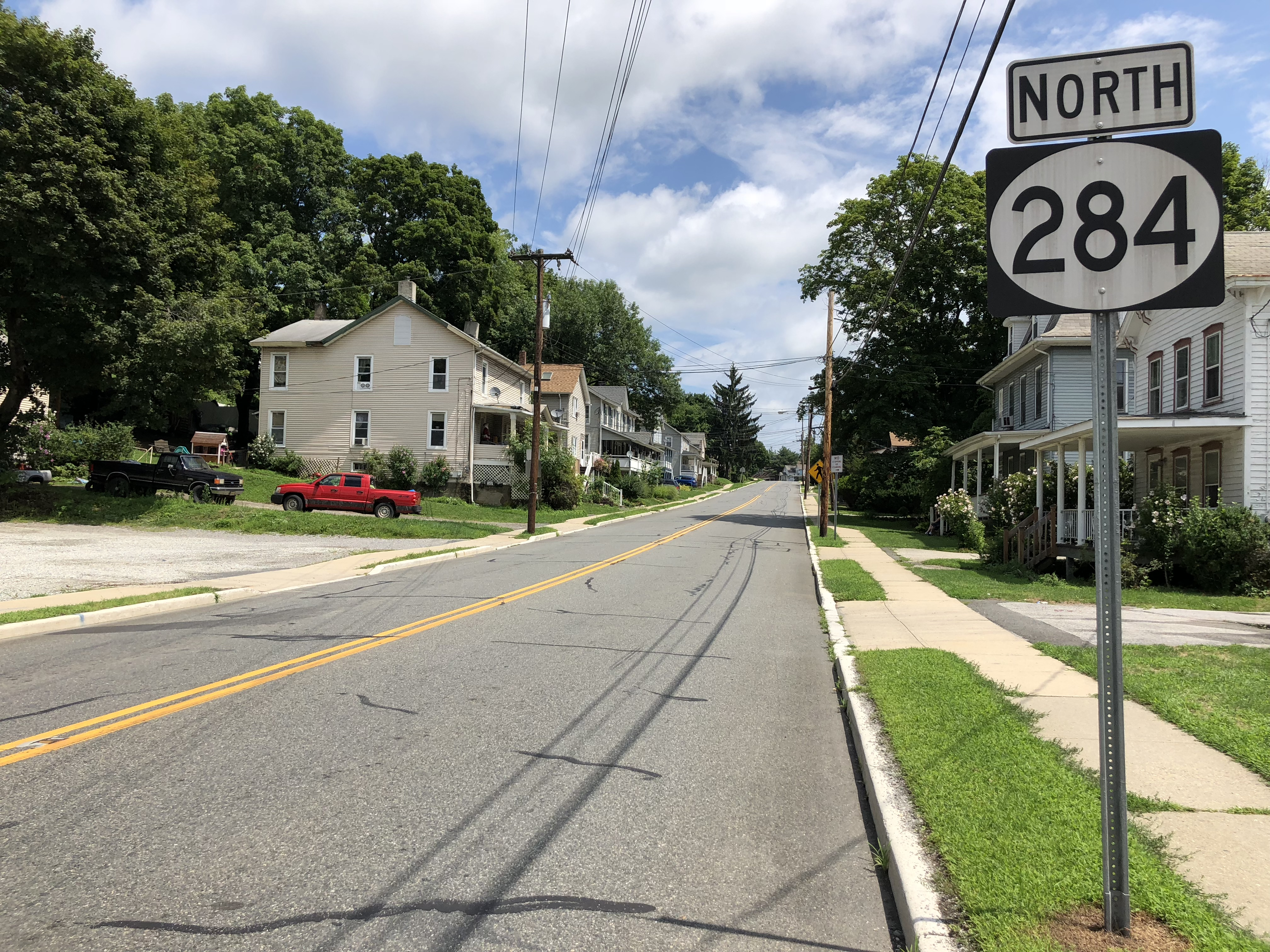
View north at the south end of Route 284 at Route 23 in Sussex

Route 284 begins at a signaled intersection in Sussex with Route 23. The route proceeds northward, intersecting with County Route 643 (CR 643) at less than a half-mile into the highway. Route 284 leaves the borough of Sussex and enters Wantage Township, intersecting with Layton Road, Janice Drive, and Possum River Road. Route 284 passes to the south of a lake, crosses over a branch of the Wallkill River and intersects with CR 642 (Bassets Bridge Road). Just after the intersection with Route 642, the rural highway crosses over Quarryville Brook. At 5.41 miles (8.71 km), Route 284 intersects with an old routing of its original designation, Route 84. The original alignment merges in with Route 284 less than a mile later. After crossing the Wallkill River branch again and the Appalachian Trail, Route 284 leaves New Jersey for New York and becomes NY 284.

== History ==
Route 8N
- Location: Sussex–New York state line
- Existed: 1927–1942

Route 84
- Location: Sussex–New York state line
- Existed: 1942–1966

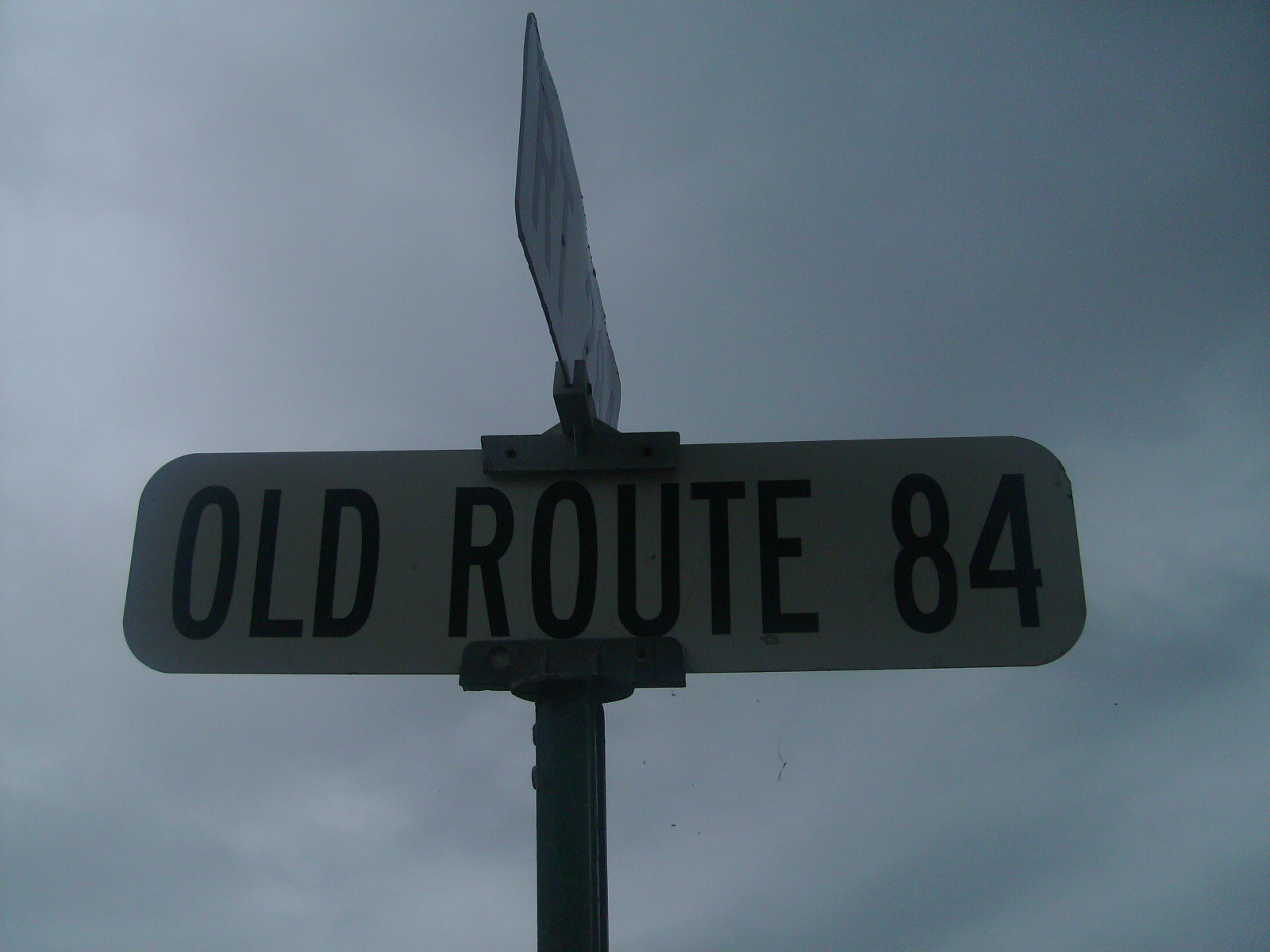
Signage for the former alignment of Route 84

Route 8, one of the routes assigned before the 1927 renumbering, ran largely along the present Route 23 corridor, but at Sussex it turned north rather than continuing northwest through High Point State Park. The section from Sussex north to the state line was taken over by the state in 1919. In the 1927 renumbering, the majority of Route 8 became Route 23. The part north of Sussex was proposed to become part of Route 31, but that was instead moved to the present Route 94 corridor in the final version of the bill. As Route 8 north of Sussex was not assigned a number, the State Highway Commission appended a suffix of N (to distinguish it from new Route 8), forming Route 8N. The connecting route in New York had been numbered New York State Route 8 to match New Jersey, but in the 1930 renumbering it became New York State Route 84, in order to free up the number 8 for a longer route. New Jersey renumbered its Route 8N to Route 84 in March 1942 to match, in part to provide a single number for military caravans during World War II.

The final renumbering was made in 1966, when Interstate 84 (I-84) opened in New York. As the new I-84 was close to the older Route 84, Route 84 was renumbered in both New York and New Jersey to 284.

== Major intersections ==
The entire route is in Sussex County.

| Location | mi | km | Destinations | Notes |
|---|---|---|---|---|
| Sussex | 0.00 | 0.00 | Route 23 (Main Street) – Newark, Newton, Port Jervis | Southern terminus |
| Wantage Township | 7.03 | 11.31 | NY 284 north – Unionville, Middletown | Continuation into New York |
1.000 mi = 1.609 km; 1.000 km = 0.621 mi
