= Riverdale, New Jersey =

Borough in Morris County, New Jersey, US

- Borough
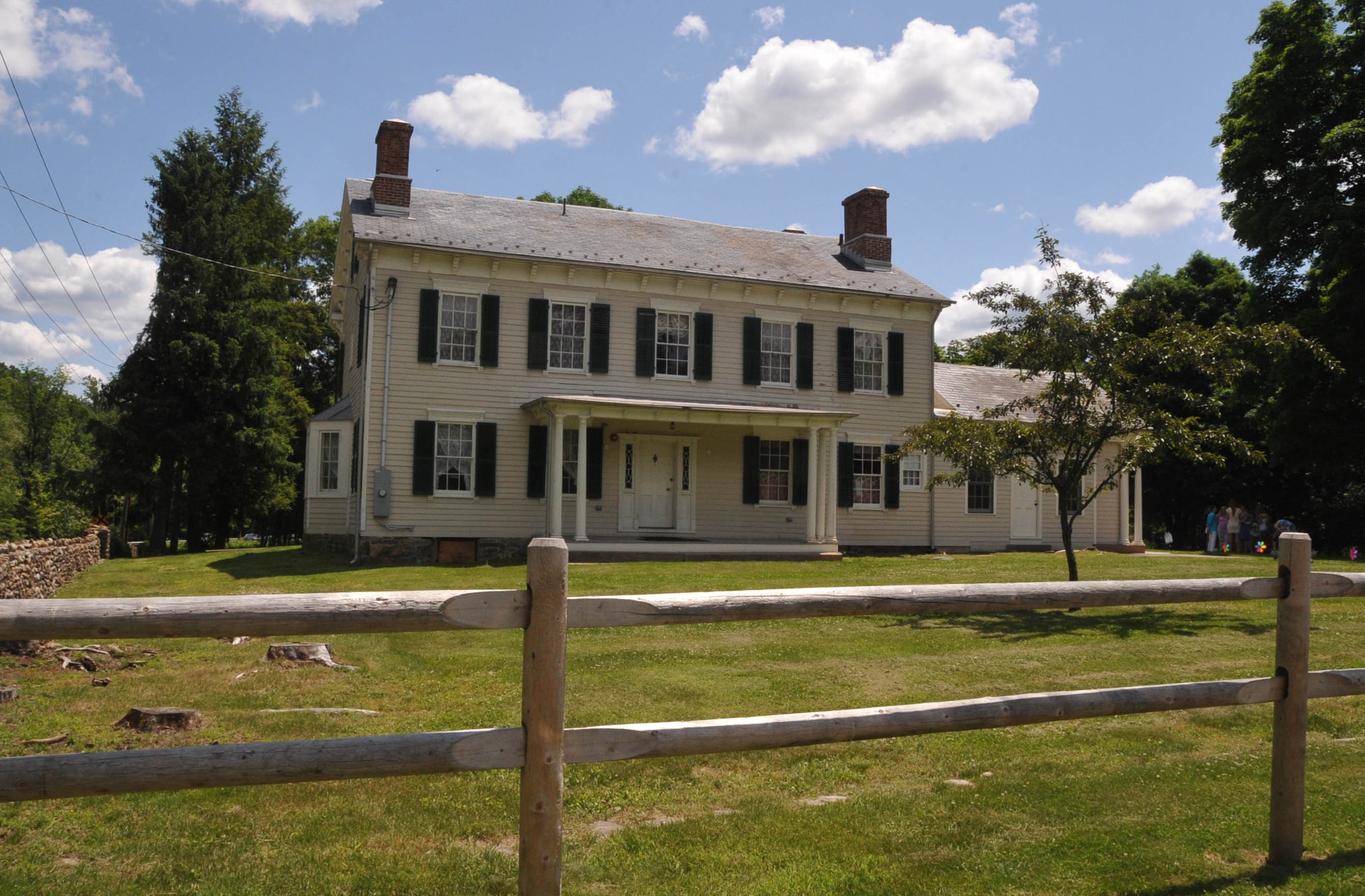
- Vanness--Linen House

- Seal

- Location in Morris County and the state of New Jersey.

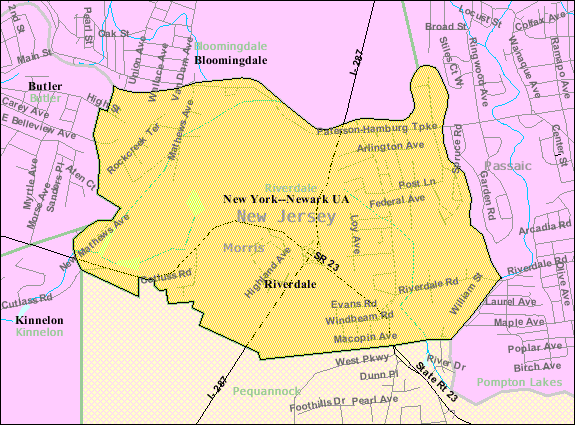
- Census Bureau map of Riverdale, New Jersey

- Location in Morris County Location in New Jersey Location in the United States
- Coordinates: 40.995886°N 74.314532°W
- Country: United States
- State: New Jersey
- County: Morris
- Incorporated: April 17, 1923

Government
  - Type: Borough
  - Body: Borough Council
  - Mayor: Paul M. Carelli (R, term ends December 31, 2027)
  - Administrator / Municipal clerk: Abubakar T. Jalloh

Area
  - Total: 2.07 sq mi (5.35 km^{2})
  - Land: 2.03 sq mi (5.25 km^{2})
  - Water: 0.042 sq mi (0.11 km^{2}) 1.98%
  - Rank: 408th of 565 in state 35th of 39 in county
- Elevation: 367 ft (112 m)

Population (2020)
  - Total: 4,107
  - Estimate (2023): 4,105
  - Rank: 411th of 565 in state 34th of 39 in county
  - Density: 2,023.2/sq mi (781.2/km^{2})
  - Rank: 294th of 565 in state 15th of 39 in county
- Time zone: UTC−05:00 (Eastern (EST))
  - Summer (DST): UTC−04:00 (Eastern (EDT))
- ZIP Code: 07457
- Area code: 973
- FIPS code: 3402763300
- GNIS feature ID: 0885371
- Website: www.riverdalenj.gov

Riverdale is a borough in Morris County, in the U.S. state of New Jersey. As of the 2020 United States census, the borough's population was 4,107, an increase of 548 (+15.4%) from the 2010 census count of 3,559, which in turn reflected an increase of 1,061 (+42.5%) from the 2,498 counted in the 2000 census.

Riverdale was incorporated as a borough by an act of the New Jersey Legislature on March 12, 1923, from portions of Pequannock Township, subject to the results of a referendum passed on April 17, 1923. Riverdale is situated in the northeasternmost part of Morris County bordering Passaic County along the Pequannock and Pompton rivers.

== Geography and climate ==
According to the United States Census Bureau, the borough had a total area of 2.07 square miles (5.35 km^{2}), including 2.03 square miles (5.25 km^{2}) of land and 0.04 square miles (0.11 km^{2}) of water (1.98%).

The borough is bordered by the municipalities of Butler and Kinnelon to the west and by Pequannock Township to the south, all in Morris County; and by Bloomingdale to the north and Pompton Lakes to the east in Passaic County.

Climate data for Riverdale, New Jersey
Month	Jan	Feb	Mar	Apr	May	Jun	Jul	Aug	Sep	Oct	Nov	Dec	Year
Record high °F (°C)	67 (19)	72 (22)	82 (28)	95 (35)	96 (36)	95 (35)	100 (38)	101 (38)	94 (34)	90 (32)	81 (27)	74 (23)	101 (38)
Mean daily maximum °F (°C)	36 (2)	39 (4)	47 (8)	59 (15)	70 (21)	79 (26)	84 (29)	82 (28)	74 (23)	63 (17)	52 (11)	41 (5)	61 (16)
Mean daily minimum °F (°C)	18 (−8)	20 (−7)	29 (−2)	39 (4)	49 (9)	58 (14)	63 (17)	61 (16)	54 (12)	41 (5)	38 (3)	25 (−4)	41 (5)
Record low °F (°C)	−11 (−24)	−5 (−21)	−1 (−18)	21 (−6)	29 (−2)	41 (5)	49 (9)	42 (6)	35 (2)	21 (−6)	12 (−11)	1 (−17)	−11 (−24)
Average precipitation inches (mm)	3.95 (100)	2.98 (76)	4.04 (103)	3.23 (82)	4.54 (115)	4.34 (110)	4.31 (109)	4.25 (108)	4.58 (116)	3.67 (93)	4.10 (104)	3.79 (96)	48.78 (1,239)
Source: The Weather Channel

== Demographics ==
Historical population
Census	Pop.	Note	%±
1930	1,052		—
1940	1,110		5.5%
1950	1,352		21.8%
1960	2,596		92.0%
1970	2,729		5.1%
1980	2,530		−7.3%
1990	2,370		−6.3%
2000	2,498		5.4%
2010	3,559		42.5%
2020	4,107		15.4%
2023 (est.)	4,105	▼	0.0%
Population sources: 1930; 1940–2000 2000; 2010 2020

=== 2020 census ===
As of the 2020 census, Riverdale had a population of 4,107. The median age was 47.5 years. 15.2% of residents were under the age of 18 and 23.4% of residents were 65 years of age or older. For every 100 females there were 88.3 males, and for every 100 females age 18 and over there were 86.1 males age 18 and over.

100.0% of residents lived in urban areas, while 0.0% lived in rural areas.

There were 1,929 households in Riverdale, of which 21.6% had children under the age of 18 living in them. Of all households, 41.3% were married-couple households, 19.9% were households with a male householder and no spouse or partner present, and 32.2% were households with a female householder and no spouse or partner present. About 38.0% of all households were made up of individuals and 16.0% had someone living alone who was 65 years of age or older.

There were 2,009 housing units, of which 4.0% were vacant. The homeowner vacancy rate was 0.5% and the rental vacancy rate was 4.7%.

Racial composition as of the 2020 census
Race	Number	Percent
White	3,353	81.6%
Black or African American	90	2.2%
American Indian and Alaska Native	32	0.8%
Asian	219	5.3%
Native Hawaiian and Other Pacific Islander	2	0.0%
Some other race	123	3.0%
Two or more races	288	7.0%
Hispanic or Latino (of any race)	411	10.0%

=== 2010 census ===
The 2010 United States census counted 3,559 people, 1,547 households, and 917 families in the borough. The population density was 1,766.5 per square mile (682.0/km^{2}). There were 1,657 housing units at an average density of 822.5 per square mile (317.6/km^{2}). The racial makeup was 89.86% (3,198) White, 1.21% (43) Black or African American, 0.06% (2) Native American, 5.31% (189) Asian, 0.00% (0) Pacific Islander, 1.66% (59) from other races, and 1.91% (68) from two or more races. Hispanic or Latino of any race were 7.19% (256) of the population.

Of the 1,547 households, 22.7% had children under the age of 18; 48.7% were married couples living together; 7.2% had a female householder with no husband present and 40.7% were non-families. Of all households, 33.2% were made up of individuals and 10.4% had someone living alone who was 65 years of age or older. The average household size was 2.30 and the average family size was 3.01.

18.8% of the population were under the age of 18, 6.2% from 18 to 24, 32.9% from 25 to 44, 27.1% from 45 to 64, and 15.0% who were 65 years of age or older. The median age was 40.0 years. For every 100 females, the population had 96.0 males. For every 100 females ages 18 and older there were 92.7 males.

The Census Bureau's 2006–2010 American Community Survey showed that (in 2010 inflation-adjusted dollars) median household income was $86,328 (with a margin of error of +/− $9,294) and the median family income was $97,900 (+/− $13,684). Males had a median income of $63,750 (+/− $13,660) versus $52,083 (+/− $4,896) for females. The per capita income for the borough was $39,675 (+/− $3,548). About 2.1% of families and 2.6% of the population were below the poverty line, including 4.1% of those under age 18 and 4.3% of those age 65 or over.

=== 2000 census ===
As of the 2000 United States census there were 2,498 people, 919 households, and 671 families residing in the borough. The population density was 1,215.2 inhabitants per square mile (469.2/km^{2}). There were 940 housing units at an average density of 457.3 per square mile (176.6/km^{2}). The racial makeup of the borough was 93.39% White, 1.08% African American, 0.04% Native American, 2.72% Asian, 1.60% from other races, and 1.16% from two or more races. Hispanic or Latino of any race were 4.40% of the population.

Riverdale has a substantial Italian population, with 25.1% of residents reporting that they were of Italian ancestry in the 2000 Census.

There were 919 households, out of which 32.1% had children under the age of 18 living with them, 60.2% were married couples living together, 10.0% had a female householder with no husband present, and 26.9% were non-families. 21.1% of all households were made up of individuals, and 7.4% had someone living alone who was 65 years of age or older. The average household size was 2.68 and the average family size was 3.14.

In the borough the population was spread out, with 23.5% under the age of 18, 7.4% from 18 to 24, 33.5% from 25 to 44, 23.6% from 45 to 64, and 12.1% who were 65 years of age or older. The median age was 37 years. For every 100 females, there were 94.1 males. For every 100 females age 18 and over, there were 90.7 males.

The median income for a household in the borough was $71,083, and the median income for a family was $79,557. Males had a median income of $50,457 versus $41,420 for females. The per capita income for the borough was $31,187. About 3.0% of families and 5.3% of the population were below the poverty line, including 6.9% of those under age 18 and 3.7% of those age 65 or over.

== Government ==
=== Local government ===
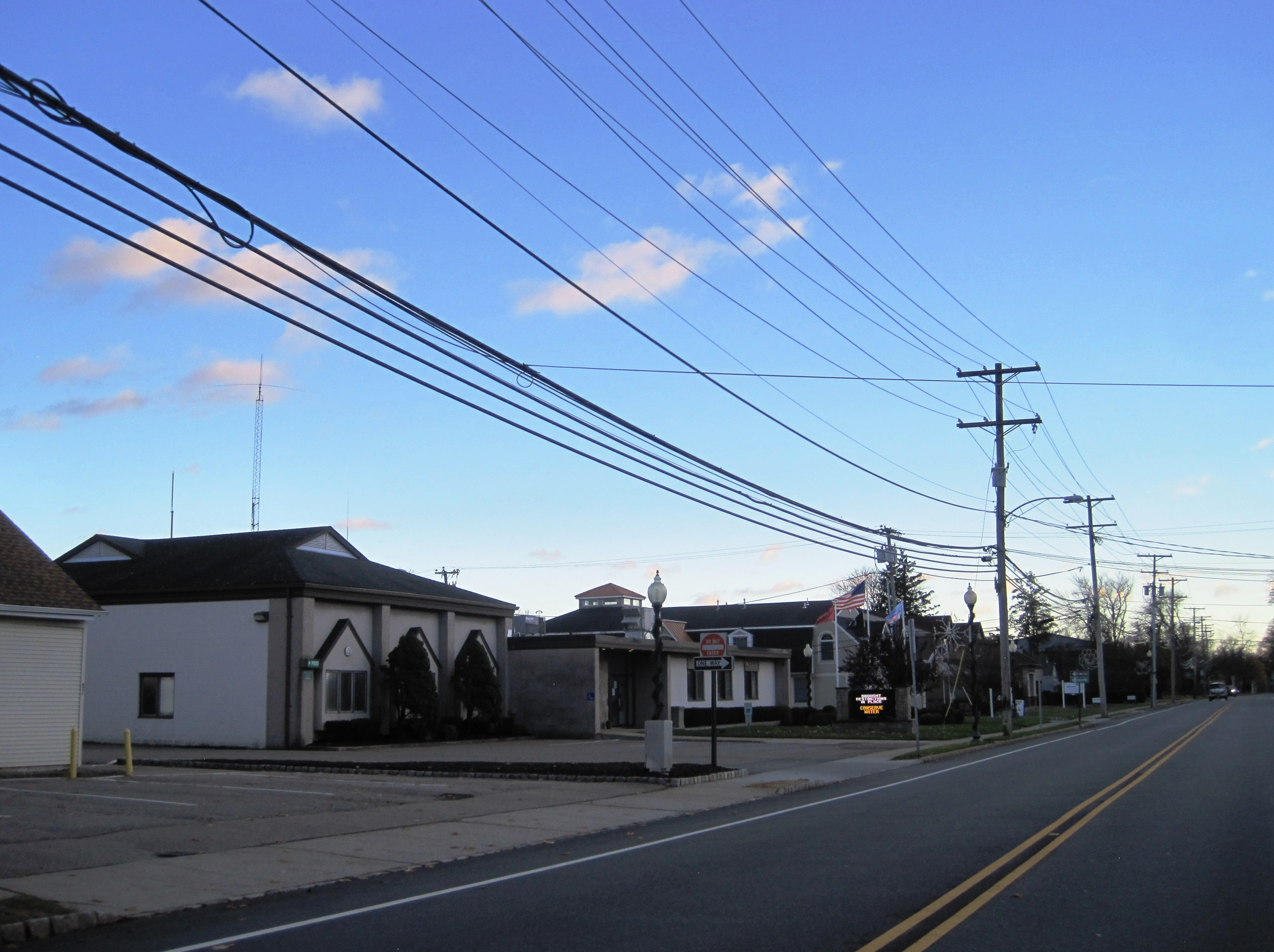
Riverdale Municipal Building

Riverdale is governed under the borough form of New Jersey municipal government, which is used in 218 municipalities (of the 564) statewide, making it the most common form of government in New Jersey. The governing body is comprised of the mayor and the borough council, with all positions elected at-large on a partisan basis as part of the November general election. The mayor is elected directly by the voters to a four-year term of office. The borough council includes six members elected to serve three-year terms on a staggered basis, with two seats coming up for election each year in a three-year cycle. The borough form of government used by Riverdale is a "weak mayor / strong council" government in which council members act as the legislative body with the mayor presiding at meetings and voting only in the event of a tie. The mayor can veto ordinances subject to an override by a two-thirds majority vote of the council. The mayor makes committee and liaison assignments for council members, and most appointments are made by the mayor with the advice and consent of the council.

As of 2023, the mayor of Riverdale is Republican Paul M. Carelli, whose term of office ends December 31, 2023. Members of the Borough Council are Council President Vincent L. Pellegrini (R, 2023), Dave Desai (R, 2024), Michael Kheyfets (R, 2023), Matt Oswald (R, 2024), Paul A. Purcell (R, 2025) and Stephen W. Revis (R, 2026).

=== Federal, state and county representation ===
Riverdale is located in the 11th Congressional District and is part of New Jersey's 26th state legislative district.

For the 119th United States Congress, New Jersey's 11th congressional district is represented by Analilia Mejia (D, Glen Ridge) who was elected in a 2026 special election to serve for the remainder of the Congress following the resignation Mikie Sherrill (D, Montclair), who was elected Governor of New Jersey in 2025. New Jersey is represented in the United States Senate by Democrats Cory Booker (Newark, term ends 2027) and Andy Kim (Moorestown, term ends 2031).

For the 2026–2027 session, the 26th legislative district of the New Jersey Legislature is represented in the State Senate by Joseph Pennacchio (R, Rockaway Township) and in the General Assembly by Brian Bergen (R, Denville Township) and Jay Webber (R, Morris Plains).

Morris County is governed by a Board of County Commissioners comprised of seven members who are elected at-large in partisan elections to three-year terms on a staggered basis, with either one or three seats up for election each year as part of the November general election. Actual day-to-day operation of departments is supervised by County Administrator Deena Leary.

As of 2026, Morris County's Commissioners (with all terms ending December 31) are Director Stephen H. Shaw (R, Mountain Lakes, 2027), Deputy Director John Krickus (R, Washington Township, 2027), Douglas Cabana (R, Boonton Township, 2028), Thomas J. Mastrangelo (R, Montville, 2028), Christine Myers (R, Harding Township, 2028), Tayfun Selen (R, Chatham Township, 2026), and Deborah Smith (R, Denville Township, 2027).

The county's constitutional officers are County Clerk Ann F. Grossi (R, Parsippany–Troy Hills, 2028), Sheriff James M. Gannon (R, Boonton Township, 2025) and Surrogate Heather Darling (R, Roxbury, 2029).

=== Politics ===
United States presidential election results for Riverdale 2024 2020 2016 2012 2008 2004
Year	Republican		Democratic		Third party(ies)	
Year	No.	%	No.	%	No.	%
2024	1,485	61.21%	909	37.47%	32	1.32%
2020	1,451	57.88%	1,012	40.37%	44	1.76%
2016	1,307	59.22%	824	37.34%	76	3.44%
2012	1,085	56.51%	816	42.50%	19	0.99%
2008	1,044	57.08%	766	41.88%	19	1.04%
2004	916	62.02%	548	37.10%	13	0.88%

As of March 2011, there were a total of 2,378 registered voters in Riverdale, of which 419 (17.6%) were registered as Democrats, 803 (33.8%) were registered as Republicans and 1,155 (48.6%) were registered as Unaffiliated. There was one voter registered to another party.

In the 2012 presidential election, Republican Mitt Romney received 56.5% of the vote (1,085 cast), ahead of Democrat Barack Obama with 42.5% (816 votes), and other candidates with 1.0% (19 votes), among the 1,932 ballots cast by the borough's 2,659 registered voters (12 ballots were spoiled), for a turnout of 72.7%. In the 2008 presidential election, Republican John McCain received 56.8% of the vote (1,044 cast), ahead of Democrat Barack Obama with 41.7% (766 votes) and other candidates with 1.0% (19 votes), among the 1,837 ballots cast by the borough's 2,347 registered voters, for a turnout of 78.3%. In the 2004 presidential election, Republican George W. Bush received 61.7% of the vote (916 ballots cast), outpolling Democrat John Kerry with 36.9% (548 votes) and other candidates with 0.7% (13 votes), among the 1,485 ballots cast by the borough's 1,973 registered voters, for a turnout percentage of 75.3.

Gubernatorial election results for Riverdale
Year	Republican		Democratic		Third party(ies)	
Year	No.	%	No.	%	No.	%
2025	1,136	57.84%	819	41.70%	9	0.46%
2021	1,037	64.65%	553	34.48%	14	0.87%
2017	680	57.29%	478	40.27%	29	2.44%
2013	795	69.98%	329	28.96%	12	1.06%
2009	691	60.93%	337	29.72%	106	9.35%
2005	500	57.34%	347	39.79%	25	2.87%

In the 2013 gubernatorial election, Republican Chris Christie received 70.0% of the vote (795 cast), ahead of Democrat Barbara Buono with 29.0% (329 votes), and other candidates with 1.1% (12 votes), among the 1,159 ballots cast by the borough's 2,717 registered voters (23 ballots were spoiled), for a turnout of 42.7%. In the 2009 gubernatorial election, Republican Chris Christie received 60.3% of the vote (691 ballots cast), ahead of Democrat Jon Corzine with 29.4% (337 votes), Independent Chris Daggett with 6.6% (75 votes) and other candidates with 2.7% (31 votes), among the 1,145 ballots cast by the borough's 2,294 registered voters, yielding a 49.9% turnout.

United States Senate election results for Riverdale1
Year	Republican		Democratic		Third party(ies)	
Year	No.	%	No.	%	No.	%
2024	1,346	59.32%	888	39.14%	35	1.54%
2018	1,018	60.45%	614	36.46%	52	3.09%
2012	972	55.93%	742	42.69%	24	1.38%
2006	538	60.86%	321	36.31%	25	2.83%

United States Senate election results for Riverdale2
Year	Republican		Democratic		Third party(ies)	
Year	No.	%	No.	%	No.	%
2020	1,359	57.08%	999	41.96%	23	0.97%
2014	556	60.96%	340	37.28%	16	1.75%
2013	495	61.26%	306	37.87%	7	0.87%
2008	902	56.06%	688	42.76%	19	1.18%

== Education ==
The Riverdale School District serves students in pre-kindergarten through eighth grade at Riverdale Public School.< As of the 2024–25 school year, the district, comprised of one school, had an enrollment of 274 students and 32.0 classroom teachers (on an FTE basis), for a student–teacher ratio of 8.6:1.

Public school students in ninth through twelfth grades attend Pompton Lakes High School in Pompton Lakes, as part of a sending/receiving relationship with the Pompton Lakes School District. As of the 2024–25 school year, the high school had an enrollment of 610 students and 52.3 classroom teachers (on an FTE basis), for a student–teacher ratio of 11.7:1.

== Transportation ==
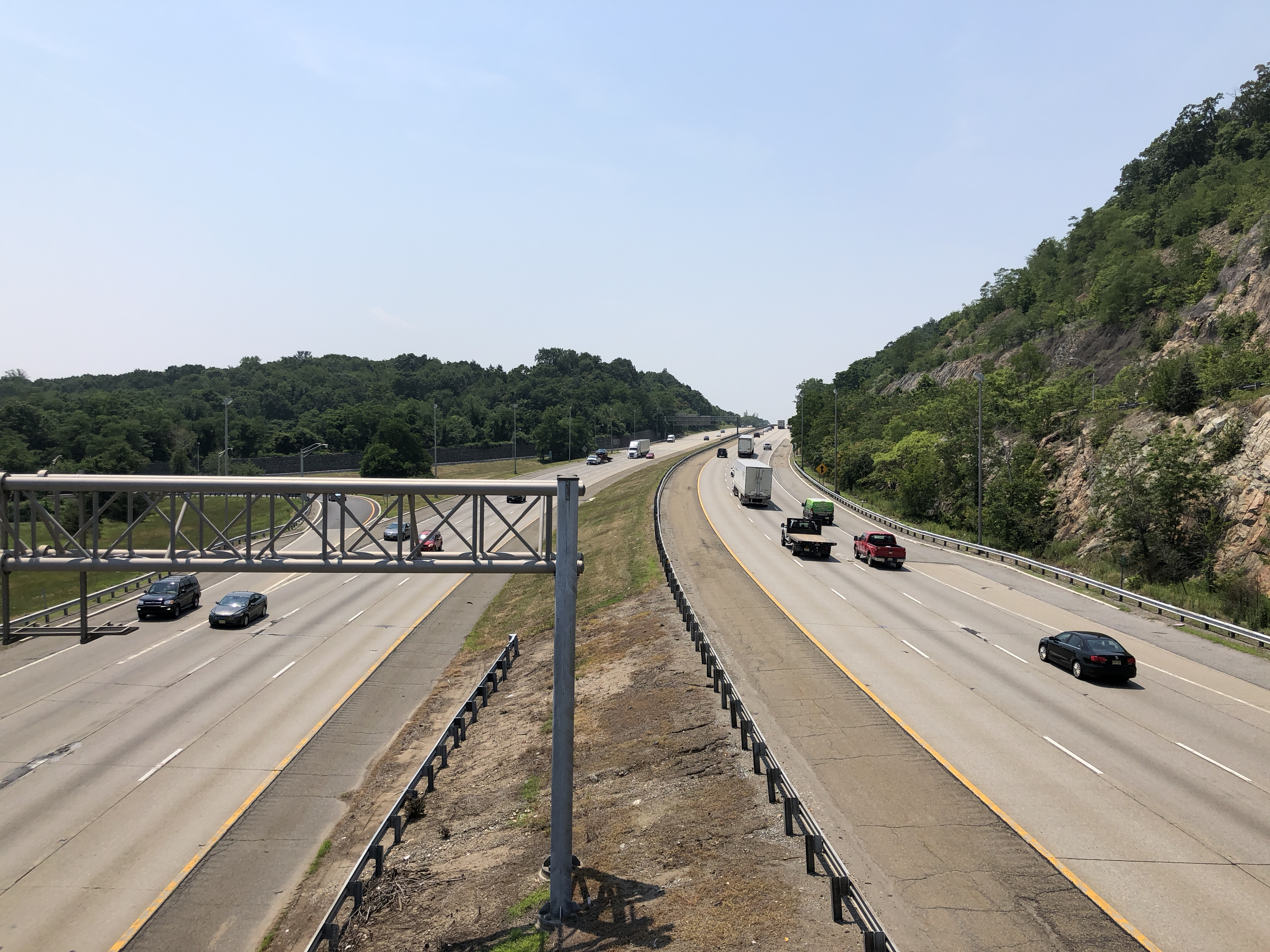
Interstate 287 southbound in Riverdale

=== Roads and highways ===
As of May 2010, the borough had a total of 16.20 miles (26.07 km) of roadways, of which 10.16 miles (16.35 km) were maintained by the municipality, 2.79 miles (4.49 km) by Morris County and 3.25 miles (5.23 km) by the New Jersey Department of Transportation

Route 23 is the main east–west road while Interstate 287 is the major north–south thoroughfare (with exits 52 and 53 in the borough). County Route 511 Alternate also passes through Riverdale.

=== Public transportation ===
NJ Transit offers bus service to the Port Authority Bus Terminal in Midtown Manhattan on the 194 route. In September 2012, as part of budget cuts, NJ Transit suspended service to Newark on the 75 line.

== Notable people ==
People who were born in, residents of, or otherwise closely associated with Riverdale include:

- Jacqueline Dubrovich (born 1994), foil fencer
- Kris Foster (born 1974), former MLB pitcher who played for the Baltimore Orioles
