= Cary station =

Cary station may refer to:

- Cary station (New Jersey), a historic former train station in Ledgewood, New Jersey
- Cary station (North Carolina), an Amtrak train station in Cary, North Carolina
- Cary station (Metra), a Metra commuter rail station in Cary, Illinois
- Cary Station, Illinois, former name of the village of Cary, Illinois
