= American Legion Memorial Highway =

The American Legion Memorial Highway can refer to the following highways in the United States:

- Interstate 75 in Michigan, entire state segment
- Interstate 81 in Pennsylvania, entire state segment
- New Jersey Route 10
