= Silas Riggs House =

Historic house in New Jersey, United States

- U.S. National Register of Historic Places
- U.S. Historic district – Contributing property
- New Jersey Register of Historic Places
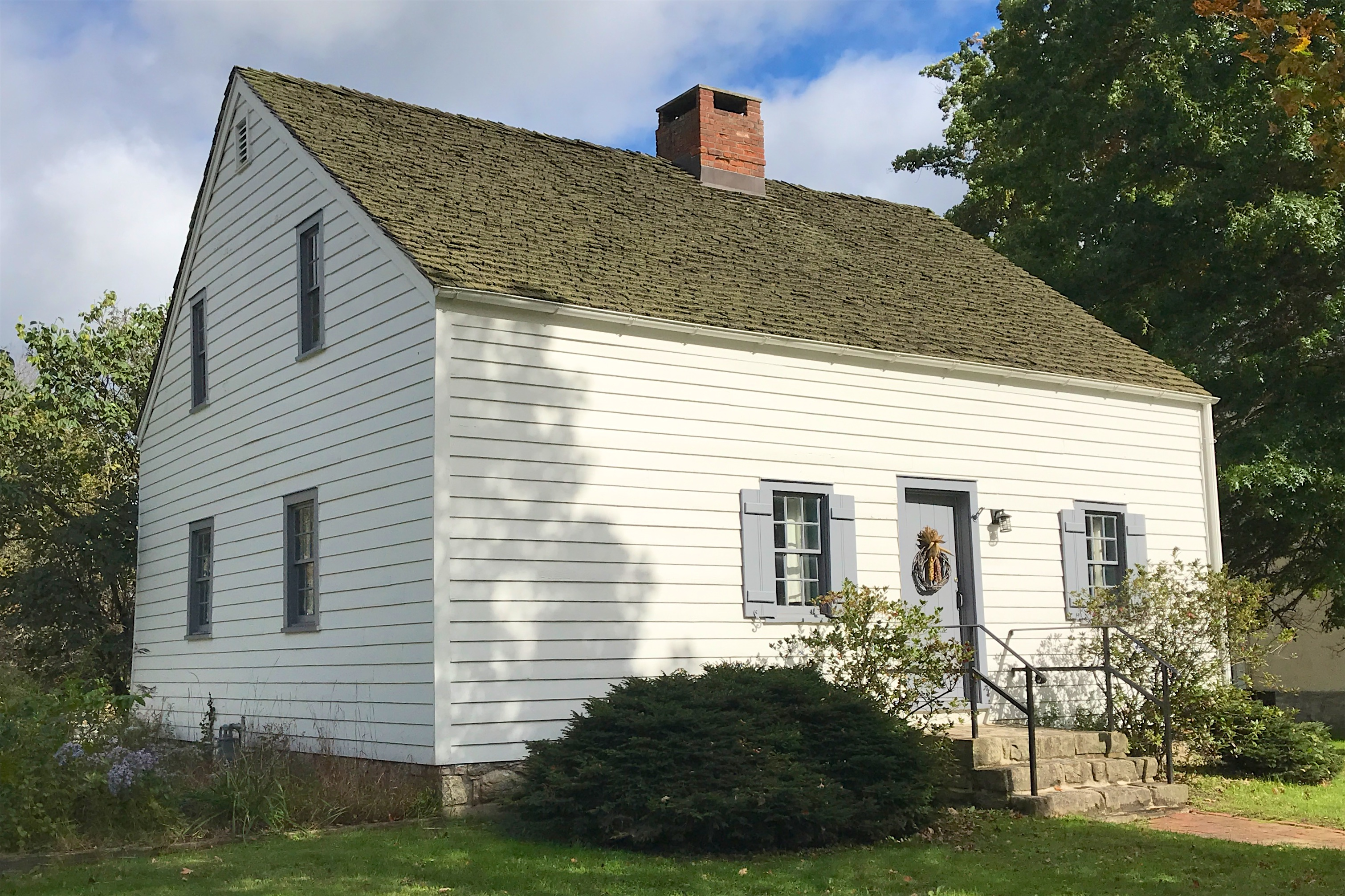
- Silas Riggs House in 2018

- Location within Morris County, New Jersey Location within New Jersey Location within the United States
- Location: 213 Main Street; Ledgewood, New Jersey
- Coordinates: 40°52′43.5″N 74°39′08″W
- Area: 1 acre (0.40 ha)
- Built: c. 1805
- Part of: Ledgewood Historic District (ID13000202)
- NRHP reference No.: 77000894
- NJRHP No.: 2253

Significant dates
- Added to NRHP: November 11, 1977
- Designated CP: April 18, 2013
- Designated NJRHP: September 20, 1974

The Silas Riggs House is a historic house built around 1805 by Silas Riggs (1779–1847) in the Ledgewood section of Roxbury Township in Morris County, New Jersey, United States. It was added to the National Register of Historic Places on November 11, 1977, for its significance in architecture and community history. It was later added as a contributing property to the Ledgewood Historic District on April 18, 2013.

== History and description ==
Silas Riggs was born in Mendham and moved here, then known as Drakesville, around 1805. Riggs was a tanner, and later a canal boat owner, operating on the Morris Canal. His son, Albert Rose Riggs, owned the King Store. The one and one-half story frame house was moved to its current location in 1962. It was restored by the Roxbury Township Historical Society.

== See also ==
- List of museums in New Jersey
- National Register of Historic Places listings in Morris County, New Jersey
