= Ledgewood Circle =

Location
- Roxbury, New Jersey
- Roads at junction: US 46; Route 10

Construction
- Type: Traffic circle

The Ledgewood Circle was the intersection of Route 10 and (US 46 in the Ledgewood section of Roxbury, in Morris County, New Jersey. Both highways are major east–west arteries in Morris County, New Jersey, and both are also lined with businesses and strip malls. Consequently Route 10 and US 46 experience heavy daily use, especially during the rush hours and on the weekends. This intersection is also the western terminus of Route 10.

== Replacement ==
In the mid 1990s, the New Jersey Department of Transportation dismantled the Ledgewood Circle and reconfigured the two highways into a signalized T-intersection.

Before the circle was replaced, eastbound traffic on U.S. Route 46 had to travel almost three-quarters of the way around the circle (while contending with traffic merging on to U.S. Route 46 east and west from Route 10 west) in order to continue traveling on U.S. Route 46 east.

Travelers on U.S. Route 46 west wishing to travel on Route 10 east also had to go almost three-quarters of the way around the circle with the same merging traffic to reach Route 10 eastbound. There were traffic metering signals to provide gaps in traffic so that motorists could in theory move in and out of the circle safely, but these signals were overwhelmed by the volume of daily traffic entering and exiting the circle and were not effective.

Speeding around the circle was a hazard as well because the roadway was broad and the circle itself had a large diameter, allowing those who wished to travel at highway speeds (50 to 55 miles per hour (80 to 89 km/h)) to do so even though these speeds were significantly higher than the advisory speed of 25 mph (40 km/h). This was the cause of many serious automobile accidents at the circle and another reason that the circle was replaced.

== Since replacement ==
Since the circle has been replaced, traffic approaching the former circle from the west while moving eastbound on US 46 uses a new roadway that cuts through the middle of the former circle. Traffic must then use two dedicated left turn lanes governed by a signal to turn onto the original alignment of US 46 eastbound. Motorists wishing to travel on Route 10 eastbound maintain their travel lanes as those lanes become Route 10 eastbound. There is a signal for these lanes too, it stops eastbound traffic to allow for U-turns and westbound US 46 traffic to make a left turn onto eastbound Route 10.

Traffic on US 46 westbound merges on to a new two lane roadway that occupies the former south-western roadway of the old circle. Traffic is governed by a signal which permits westbound US 46 traffic to merge on to the original divided highway that carried US 46 west from the circle. Westbound travelers wishing to make a left turn onto Route 10 eastbound bear left from US 46 westbound before this merge and use dedicated left turn lanes to make this move.

Traffic on Route 10 westbound wishing to travel onto US 46 eastbound merge right at the terminus of Route 10 and travel onto the original alignment of US 46 eastbound. There is no signal for this traffic and it must yield to on coming traffic. Travelers on Route 10 westbound wishing to use US 46 westbound maintain their travel lanes and merge onto the original US 46 westbound divided highway via a new roadway built through the middle of the old Ledgewood Circle. These lanes are governed by a traffic signal which allows for U-turns and US 46 eastbound traffic to make a left turn to continue on US 46 eastbound.

While the intersection is more heavily used than ever, traffic moves through much more safely and fluidly with this new alignment.

== Tree controversy ==
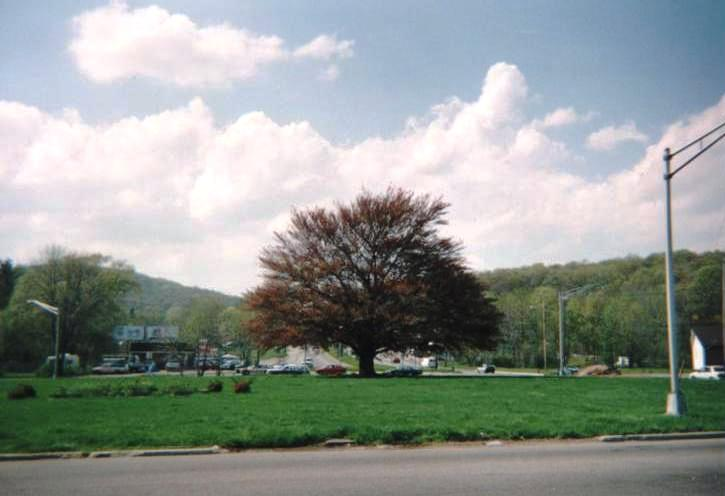
European beech tree blooms on Ledgewood Circle in Spring 1994

A 40-foot-tall (12 m) purple European beech tree grew in the former Ledgewood Circle. The tree was going to be destroyed during the replacement project, and as a result a grass-roots effort was taken up by local residents, led by Marion Whitescarver beginning in 1994, to save the tree. Philip Amsterdam, president of the Marsellis Warner Corp., who was hired to eliminate the Ledgewood Circle, offered to move the tree at no cost to the township. He was told that tree experts hired by the municipality said it wouldn't be feasible to move it, as they determined the tree sat in a morass of rocks and boulders, making it impossible to dig under. The New Jersey Department of Transportation agreed that the tree needed to come down.

On November 20, 1997, the tree was given a one-day reprieve to consider opposition to cutting down the tree. Construction was halted to consider Amsterdam's offer. The township was not persuaded to delay construction to remove the tree for replanting, which would have required colder temperatures to ensure a frozen root ball, and the tree was cut down on November 21, 1997.

== See also ==
- List of traffic circles in New Jersey
