= Ledgewood Historic District =

Historic district in New Jersey, United States

- U.S. National Register of Historic Places
- U.S. Historic district
- New Jersey Register of Historic Places
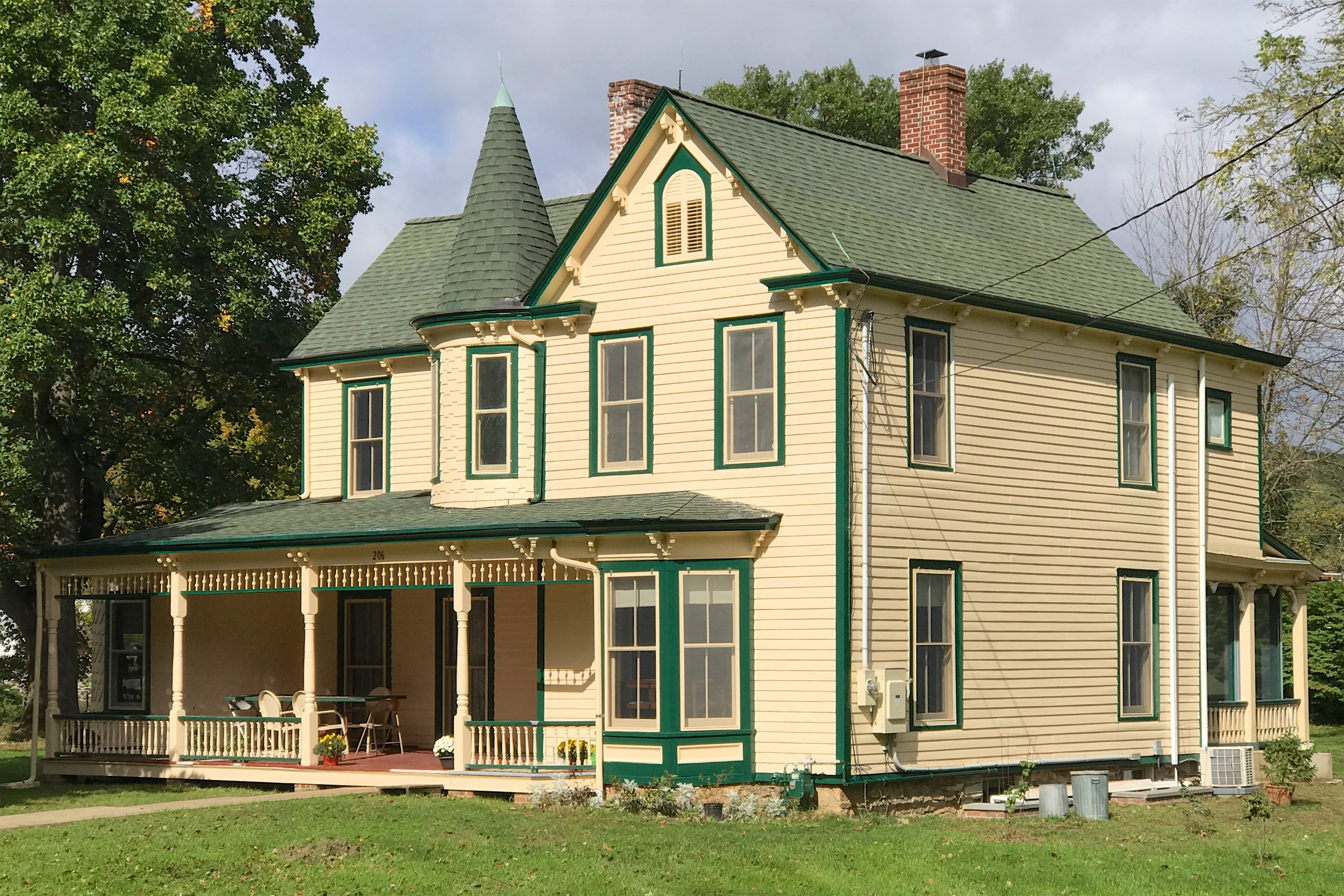
- King Homestead at 209 Main Street

- Location within Morris County, New Jersey Location within New Jersey Location within the United States
- Location: Main and Canal Streets, Circle Drive, Emmans and Mountain Roads; Ledgewood, New Jersey
- Coordinates: 40°52′47″N 74°39′15″W
- Area: 41 acres (17 ha)
- Architectural style: Italianate, Colonial Revival, Greek Revival, Queen Anne
- NRHP reference No.: 13000202
- NJRHP No.: 2897

Significant dates
- Added to NRHP: April 18, 2013
- Designated NJRHP: February 27, 2013

The Ledgewood Historic District is a 41-acre (17 ha) historic district located in the Ledgewood section of Roxbury Township in Morris County, New Jersey, United States. The district was added to the National Register of Historic Places on April 18, 2013, for its significance in architecture and community development. It has 40 contributing buildings, 4 contributing structures, and one contributing site. It includes the King Store and Homestead and the Silas Riggs House, which were both previously listed individually.

== History and description ==
The two-story frame King Homestead was built around 1878 with Italianate and Queen Anne styles. The two-story stone King Store was built in 1827 with Greek Revival architecture. The one and one-half story Silas Riggs House was built around 1805. Jackson's Store was built in the late 19th century. Canal Street follows the route of the Morris Canal in the district.

== Gallery of contributing properties ==
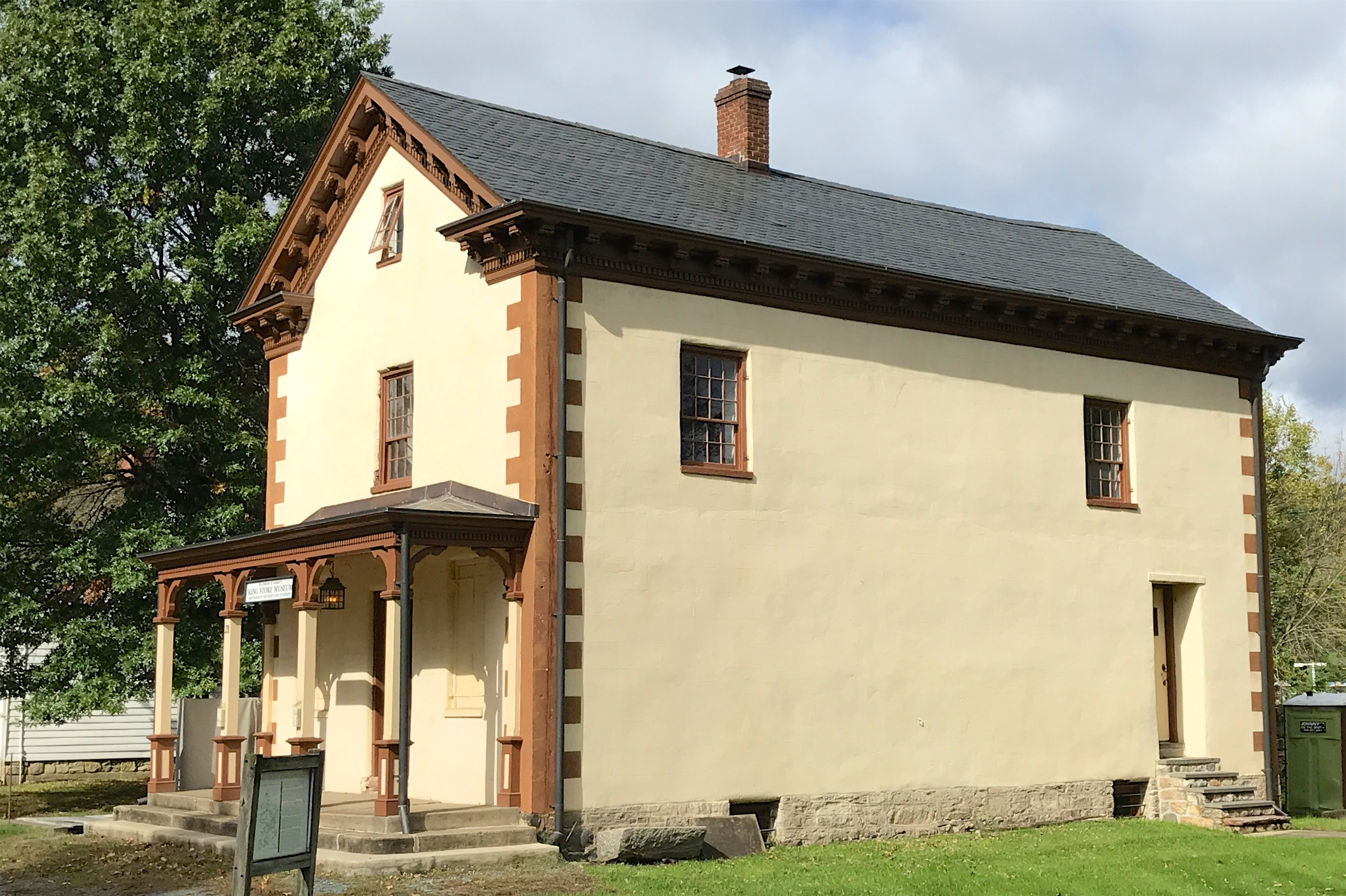
King Store

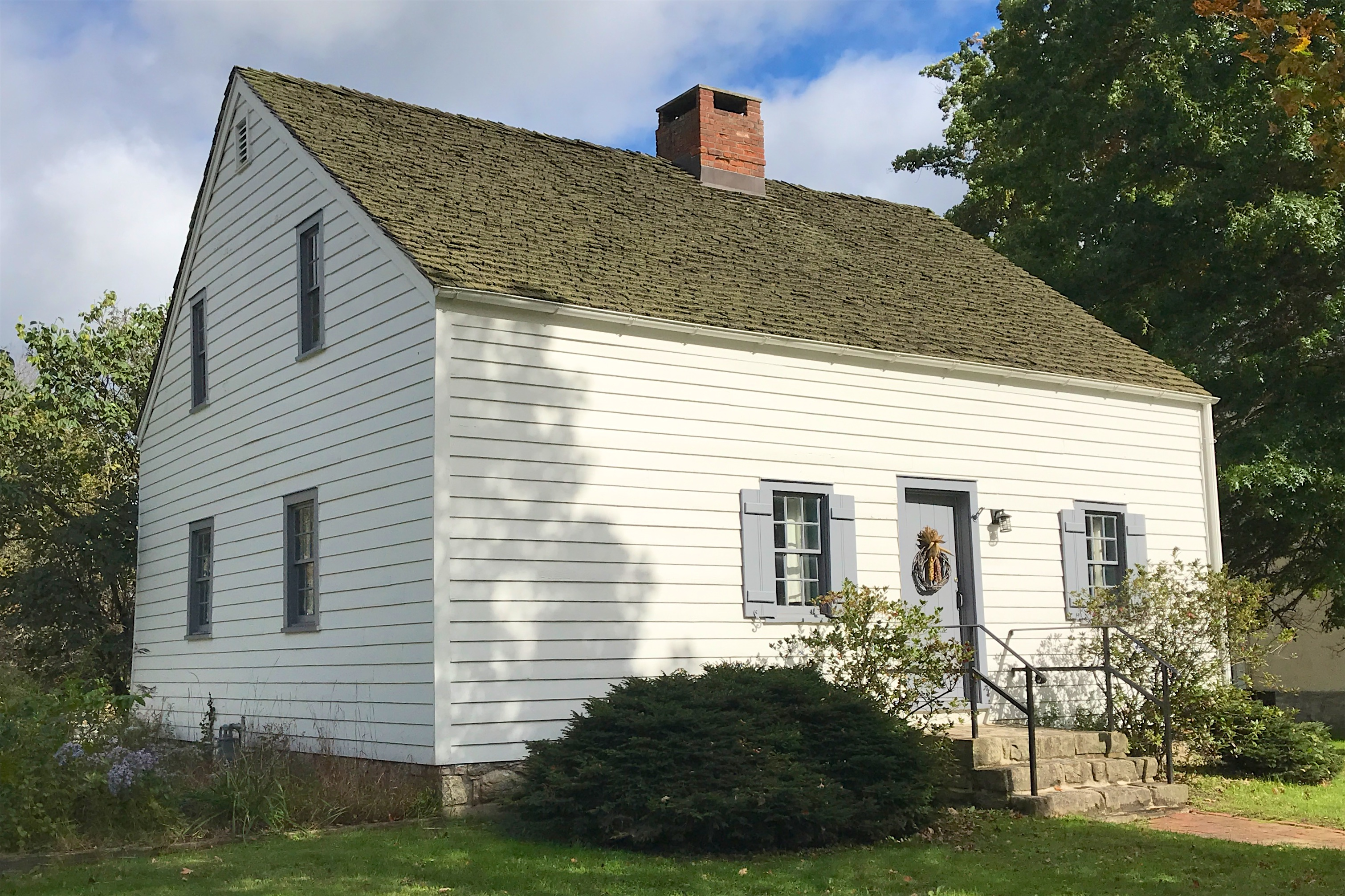
Silas Riggs House

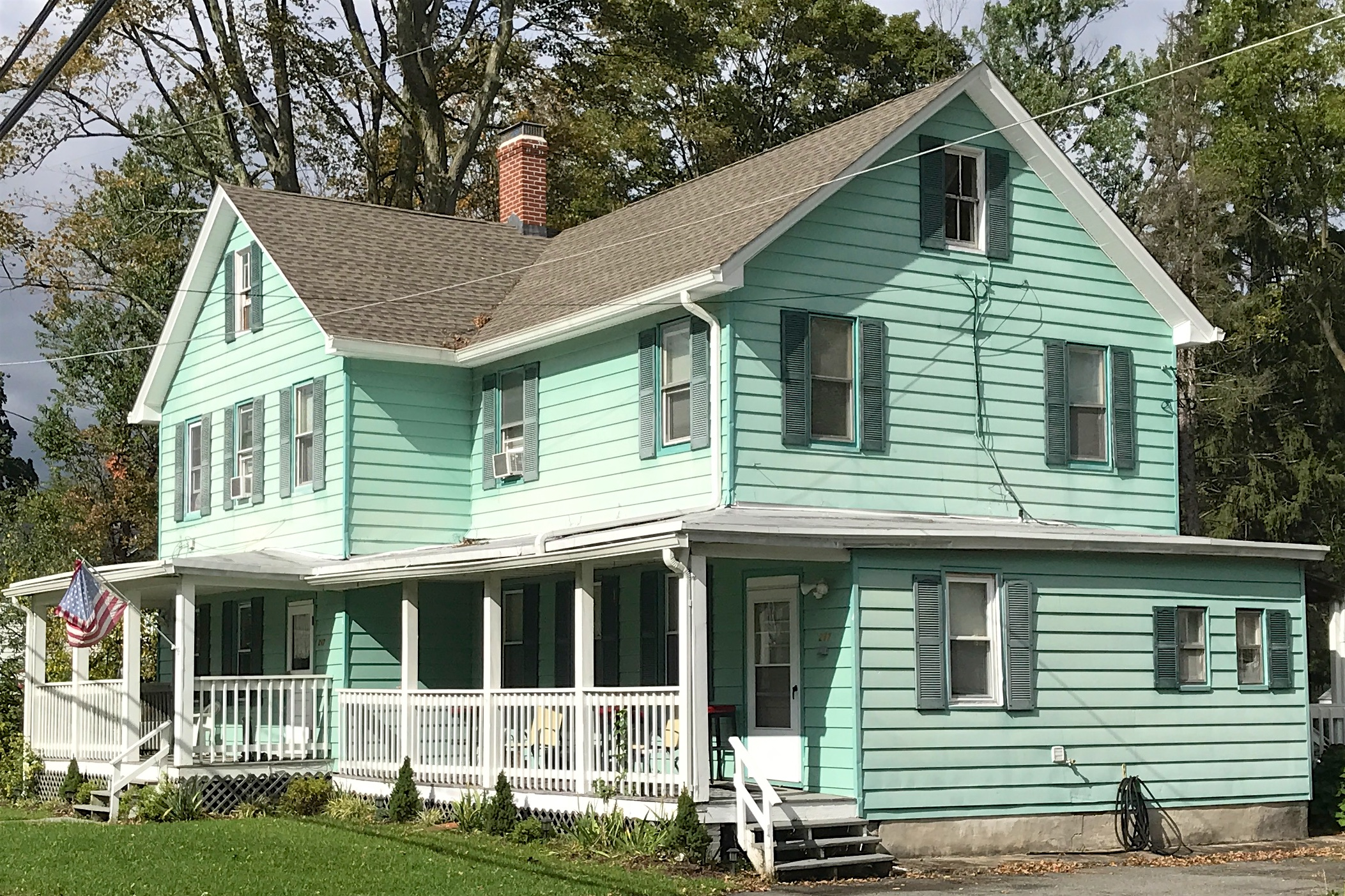
Former Jackson's Store

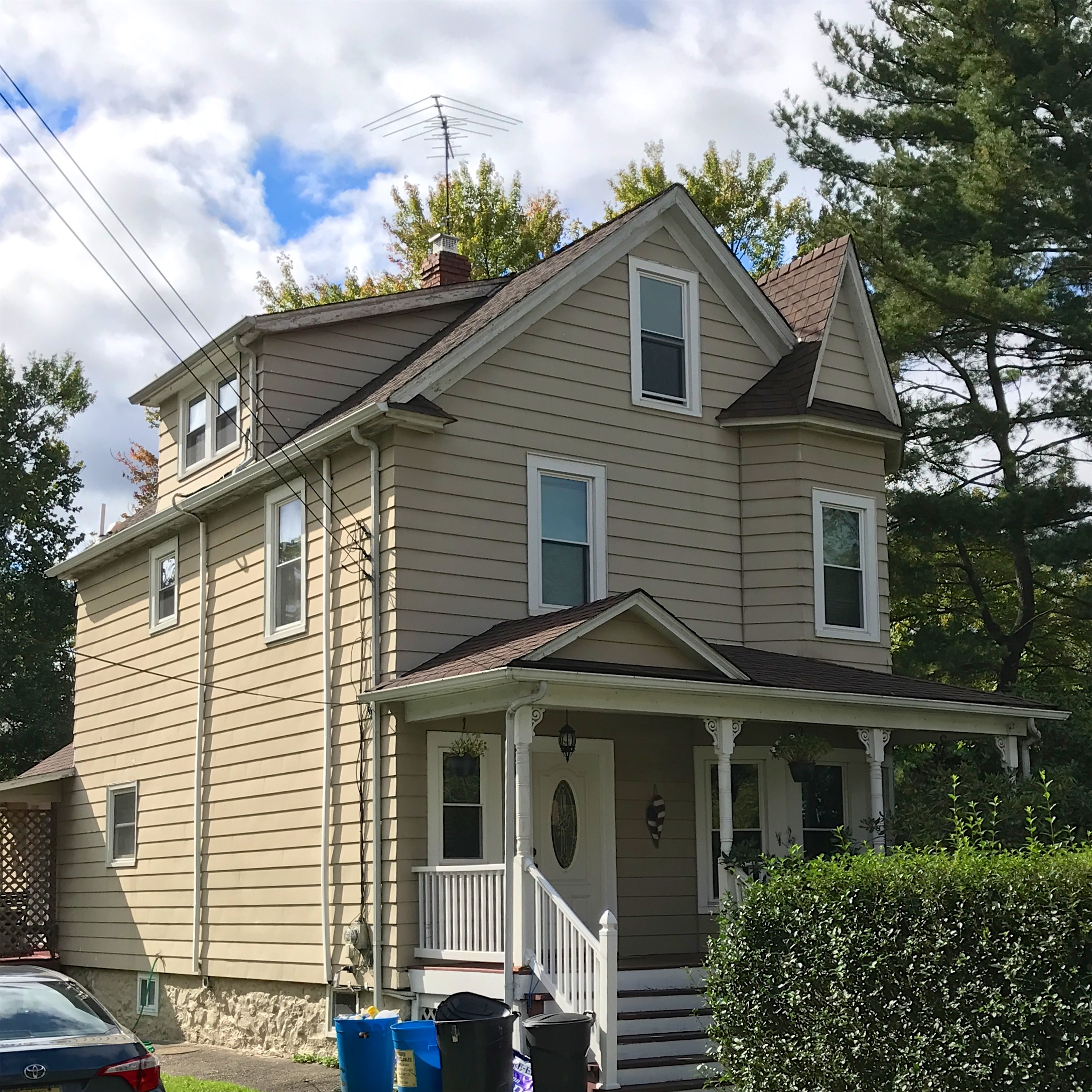
Queen Anne style house

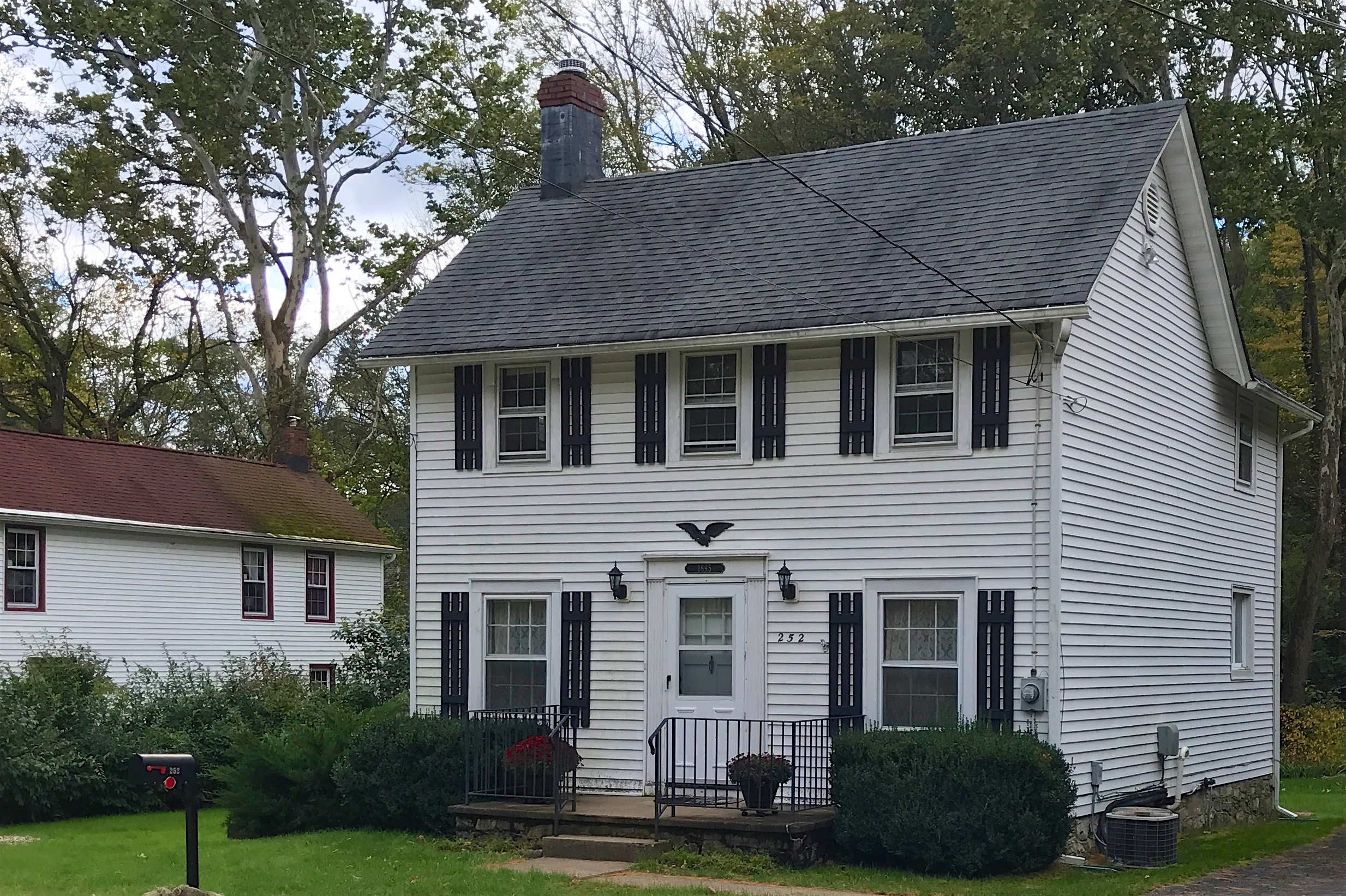
Colonial Revival style house

== See also ==
- National Register of Historic Places listings in Morris County, New Jersey
