= Ledgewood, New Jersey =

Populated place in Morris County, New Jersey, US

- Census-designated place
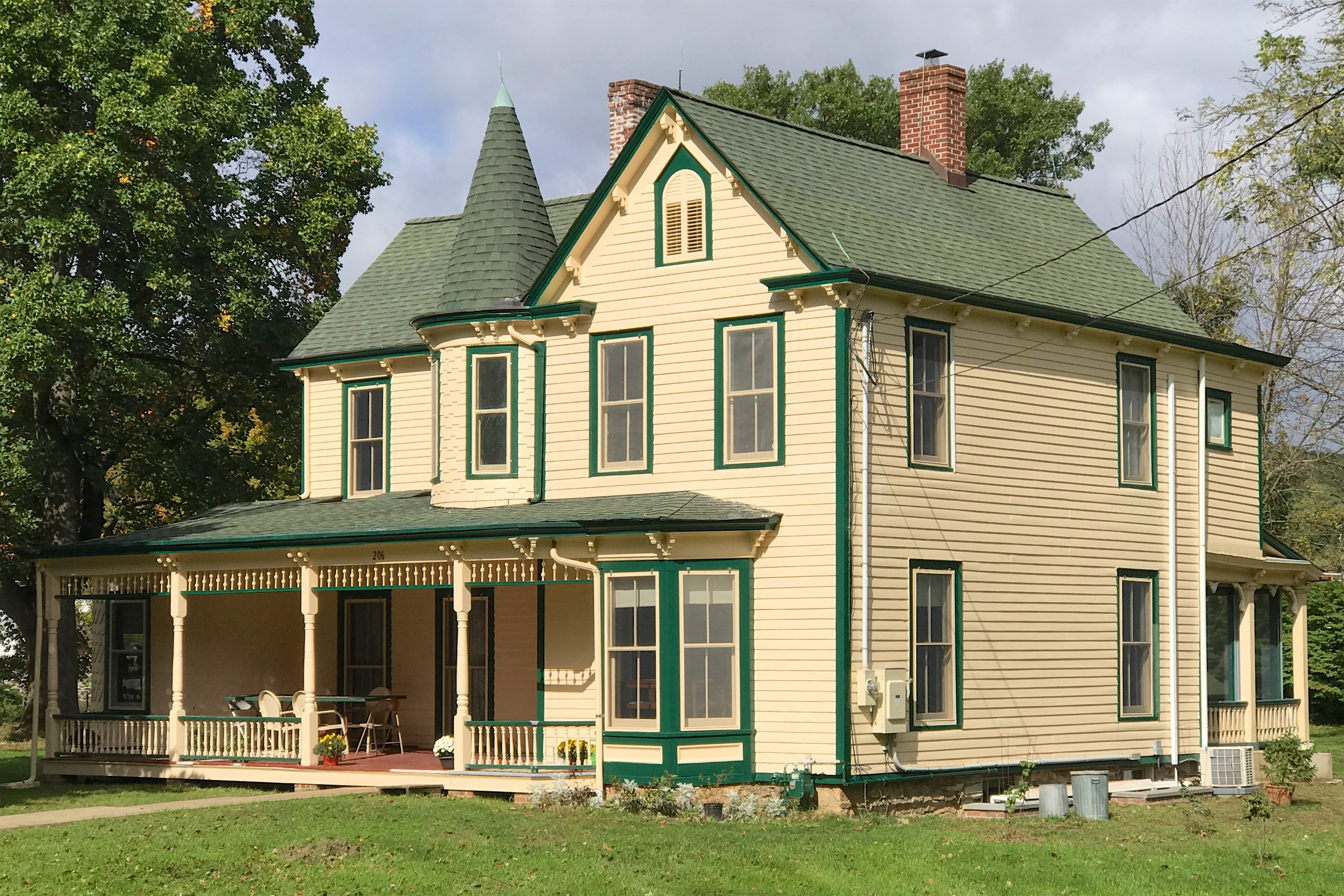
- King Homestead in the historic Drakesville section

- Location in Morris County (Inset: Morris County in New Jersey) Ledgewood (New Jersey) Ledgewood (the United States)
- Coordinates: 40°52′52″N 74°39′22″W
- Country: United States
- State: New Jersey
- County: Morris
- Township: Roxbury

Area
  - Total: 5.62 sq mi (14.55 km^{2})
  - Land: 5.54 sq mi (14.34 km^{2})
  - Water: 0.081 sq mi (0.21 km^{2})
- Elevation: 768 ft (234 m)

Population (2020)
  - Total: 4,903
  - Density: 890/sq mi (342/km^{2})
- ZIP Code: 07852 (Ledgewood); 07836 (Flanders)
- FIPS code: 34-39750
- GNIS feature ID: 0877722

Ledgewood is an unincorporated community and census-designated place (CDP) in Roxbury Township, Morris County, New Jersey, United States. It was historically known as Drakesville after Abraham Drake, originally from Piscataway, New Jersey, who operated a mill and tavern here in the mid-1700s. The community was located on the Morris Canal. The name changed to Ledgewood on January 1, 1892.

The area is served as United States Postal Service ZIP Code 07852. As of the 2020 census, the population was 4,903.

== Geography ==
Ledgewood is in western Morris County, in the western part of Roxbury Township. The CDP is bordered to the north by Landing, to the northeast by the borough of Mount Arlington, to the east by Kenvil, and to the south by Succasunna. It is bordered to the west by Flanders and Budd Lake within Mount Olive Township. The borough of Netcong is less than 1 mile (1.6 km) north of the northwest corner of Ledgewood. The unincorporated community of Ledgewood is in the eastern part of the CDP.

Interstate 80 forms the northern border of the Ledgewood CDP, with access from exits 27 (U.S. Route 206), 28 (U.S. Route 46), and 30 (Howard Boulevard). I-80 leads east 14 miles (23 km) to Parsippany and west 27 miles (43 km) to the Delaware Water Gap. US 206 runs through the more sparsely developed western part of Ledgewood, leading north into Netcong and south 22 miles (35 km) to Somerville. US 46 passes through the community of Ledgewood and the northeastern part of the CDP, leading northwest into Netcong and east 5 miles (8 km) to Dover. New Jersey Route 10 has its western terminus at US 46 in the community of Ledgewood and leads southeast into Succasunna.

According to the U.S. Census Bureau, the Ledgewood CDP has a total area of 5.62 square miles (14.56 km^{2}), of which 5.54 square miles (14.35 km^{2}) are land and 0.08 square miles (0.21 km^{2}), or 1.46%, are water. Drakes Brook has its source in Ledgewood and flows southwest to join the South Branch of the Raritan River in Washington Township.

The Shops at Ledgewood Commons is a shopping area along New Jersey Route 10 in the eastern part of Ledgewood.

== Demographics ==
Historical population
Census	Pop.	Note	%±
2020	4,903		—
U.S. Decennial Census

Ledgewood was first listed as a census designated place in the 2020 U.S. census.

=== 2020 census ===
As of the 2020 census, Ledgewood had a population of 4,903. The median age was 45.4 years. 20.8% of residents were under the age of 18 and 18.8% of residents were 65 years of age or older. For every 100 females there were 89.7 males, and for every 100 females age 18 and over there were 85.2 males age 18 and over.

93.1% of residents lived in urban areas, while 6.9% lived in rural areas.

There were 1,881 households in Ledgewood, of which 31.6% had children under the age of 18 living in them. Of all households, 56.2% were married-couple households, 11.4% were households with a male householder and no spouse or partner present, and 28.6% were households with a female householder and no spouse or partner present. About 26.9% of all households were made up of individuals and 15.8% had someone living alone who was 65 years of age or older.

There were 1,936 housing units, of which 2.8% were vacant. The homeowner vacancy rate was 1.3% and the rental vacancy rate was 3.7%.

Ledgewood CDP, New Jersey – Racial and ethnic composition Note: the US Census treats Hispanic/Latino as an ethnic category. This table excludes Latinos from the racial categories and assigns them to a separate category. Hispanics/Latinos may be of any race.
Race / Ethnicity (NH = Non-Hispanic)	Pop 2020	2020
White alone (NH)	3,486	71.10%
Black or African American alone (NH)	211	4.30%
Native American or Alaska Native alone (NH)	2	0.04%
Asian alone (NH)	409	8.34%
Native Hawaiian or Pacific Islander alone (NH)	0	0.00%
Other race alone (NH)	18	0.37%
Mixed race or Multiracial (NH)	133	2.71%
Hispanic or Latino (any race)	644	13.13%
Total	4,903	100.00%

== Notable people ==
People who were born in, residents of, or otherwise closely associated with Ledgewood include:

- Jetur R. Riggs (1809–1869), who represented New Jersey's 4th congressional district in the U.S. representative from 1859 to 1861

== Points of interest ==
- King Store and Homestead
- Ledgewood Historic District
- Morris Canal
- Silas Riggs House
- Cary Station
- Tom's Diner - The location of parts of the video for Cyndi Lauper's "Time After Time" were filmed in this now abandoned establishment

== Gallery ==
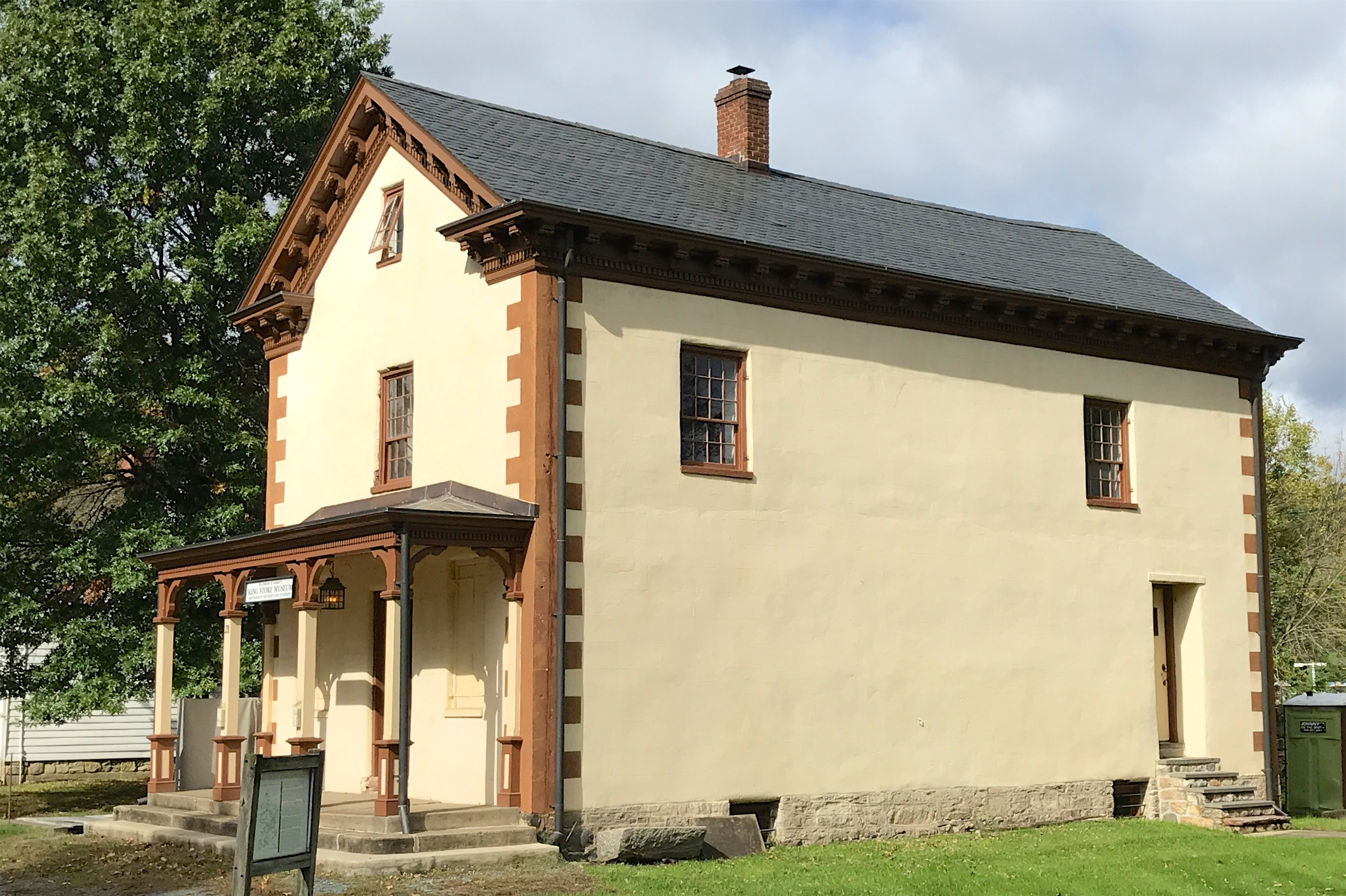
King Store

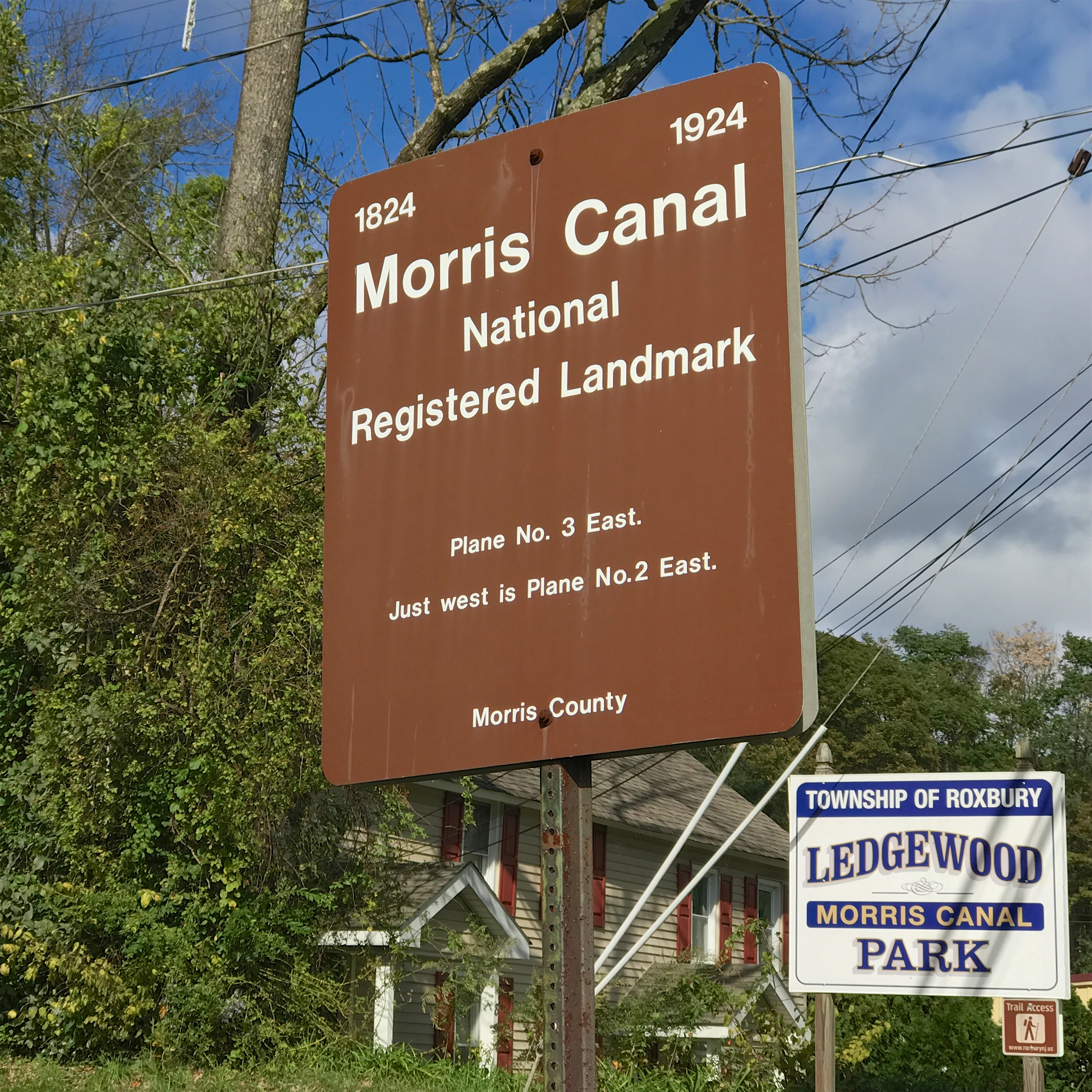
Morris Canal, Inclined Planes

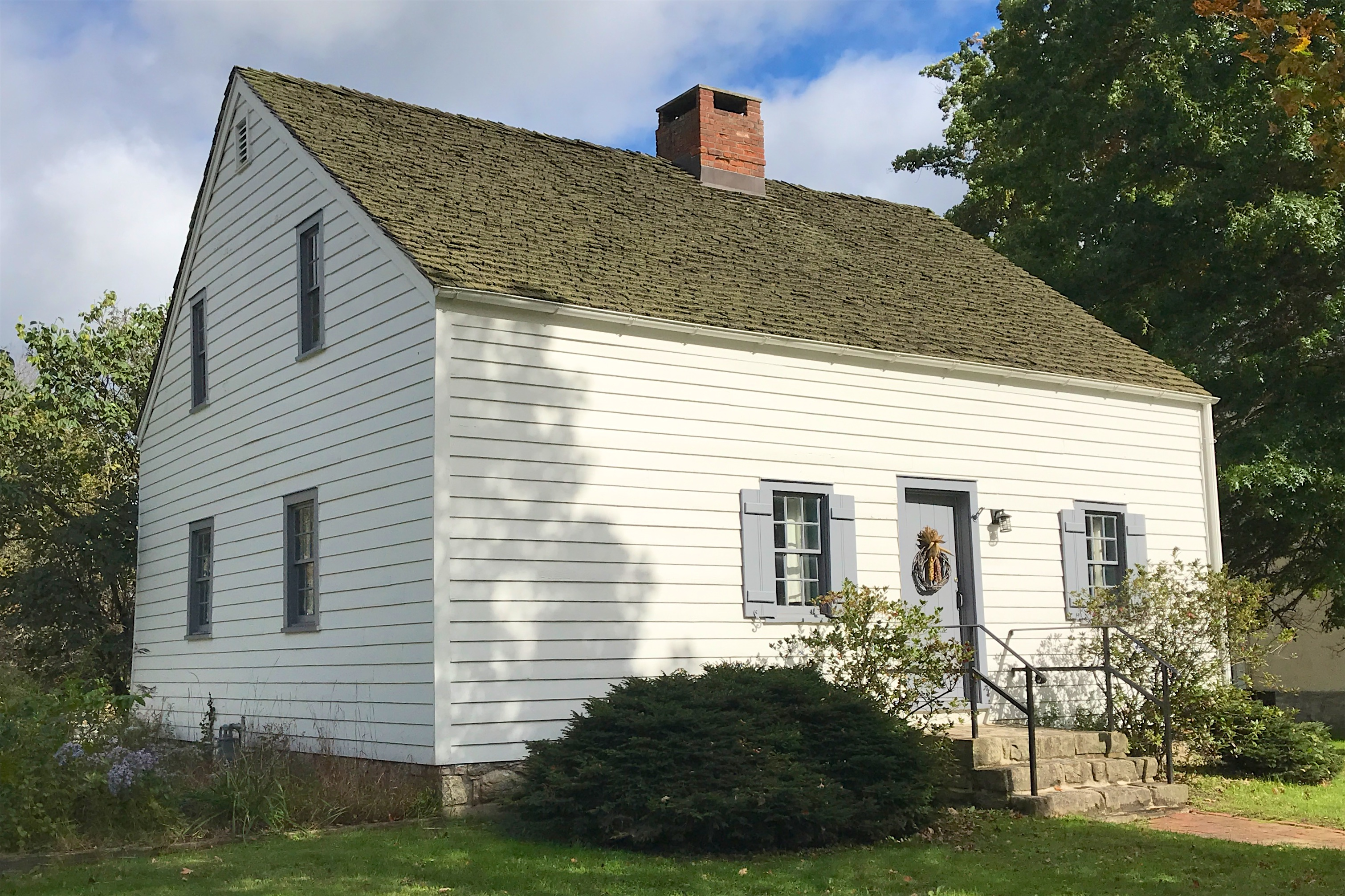
Silas Riggs House
