= New Jersey Route 10 =

State highway in northern New Jersey, US

Route 10

Route information
- Maintained by NJDOT
- Length: 23.5 mi (37.8 km)
- Existed: 1927–present

Major junctions
- West end: US 46 in Roxbury
- Route 53 in Parsippany–Troy Hills; US 202 in Parsippany–Troy Hills; I-287 in Hanover Township
- East end: CR 577 / CR 677 in West Orange

Location
- Country: United States
- State: New Jersey
- Counties: Morris, Essex

Highway system
- New Jersey State Highway Routes; Interstate; US; State; Scenic Byways
← US 9W	→ Route 11

Route 10 is a 23.5 mi (37.82 km) state highway in the northern part of the U.S. state of New Jersey. It runs from an intersection of U.S. Route 46 in Roxbury, Morris County, east to Prospect Avenue / Mount Pleasant Avenue (CR 577 / CR 677) in West Orange, Essex County. Route 10 is a major route through northern New Jersey that runs through Ledgewood, East Hanover Township, and Livingston. It is a four-lane highway for most of its length with the exception of the easternmost part of the route. Route 10 features intersections and interchanges with many major roads including Route 53 and U.S. Route 202 in Morris Plains and Interstate 287 in Hanover Township.

Route 10 was designated in 1927 to run from Jersey City to Dover, following the former Newark and Mount Pleasant Turnpike west of Newark. The route continued east from its present-day routing on current County Route 577, Park Avenue, CR 508, and Route 7 to end at U.S. Route 1/9 at the Tonnele Circle. An alignment of Route 10 farther to the north of its current alignment in Essex County was proposed in 1952; however, it was never constructed with the route being designated to its present alignment a year later. Since 1953, Route 10 has seen improvements that eliminated the Ledgewood Circle at the western terminus in 1998 and improved safety along the portion of the route in Hanover and East Hanover townships in the mid-2000s.

== Route description ==
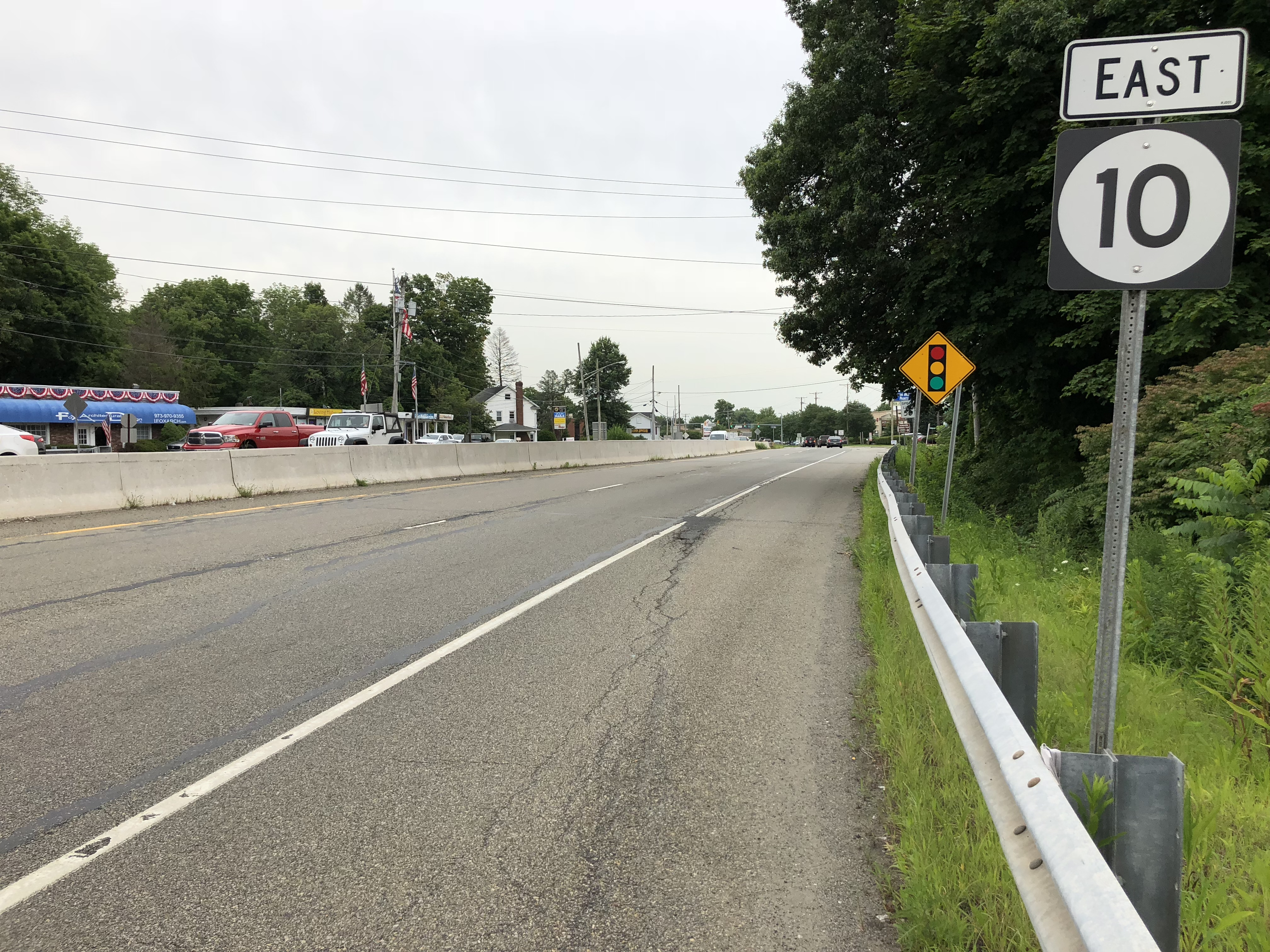
Route 10 eastbound past its western terminus at U.S. Route 46 in Roxbury Township

Route 10 begins at the intersection of US 46 in the Ledgewood section of Roxbury, Morris County at the former Ledgewood Circle, heading to the southeast on a four-lane divided highway with some jughandles. The road passes by The Shops at Ledgewood Commons, the Roxbury Mall, and many other businesses, also crossing the Dover & Rockaway River Railroad's High Bridge Branch. The route crosses the Dover & Rockaway River Railroad's Chester Branch before it enters Randolph, where the road becomes less commercial in nature and passes Randolph Lake, reaching an interchange of Sussex Turnpike (CR 617). Past this interchange, Route 10 crosses over forested Mine Hill. The route crosses the intersection of Dover-Chester Road (CR 513) and passes north of the County College of Morris past that intersection, with suburban development becoming more frequent again. Route 10 widens to six lanes and then runs through Denville before heading into the Mount Tabor section of Parsippany.

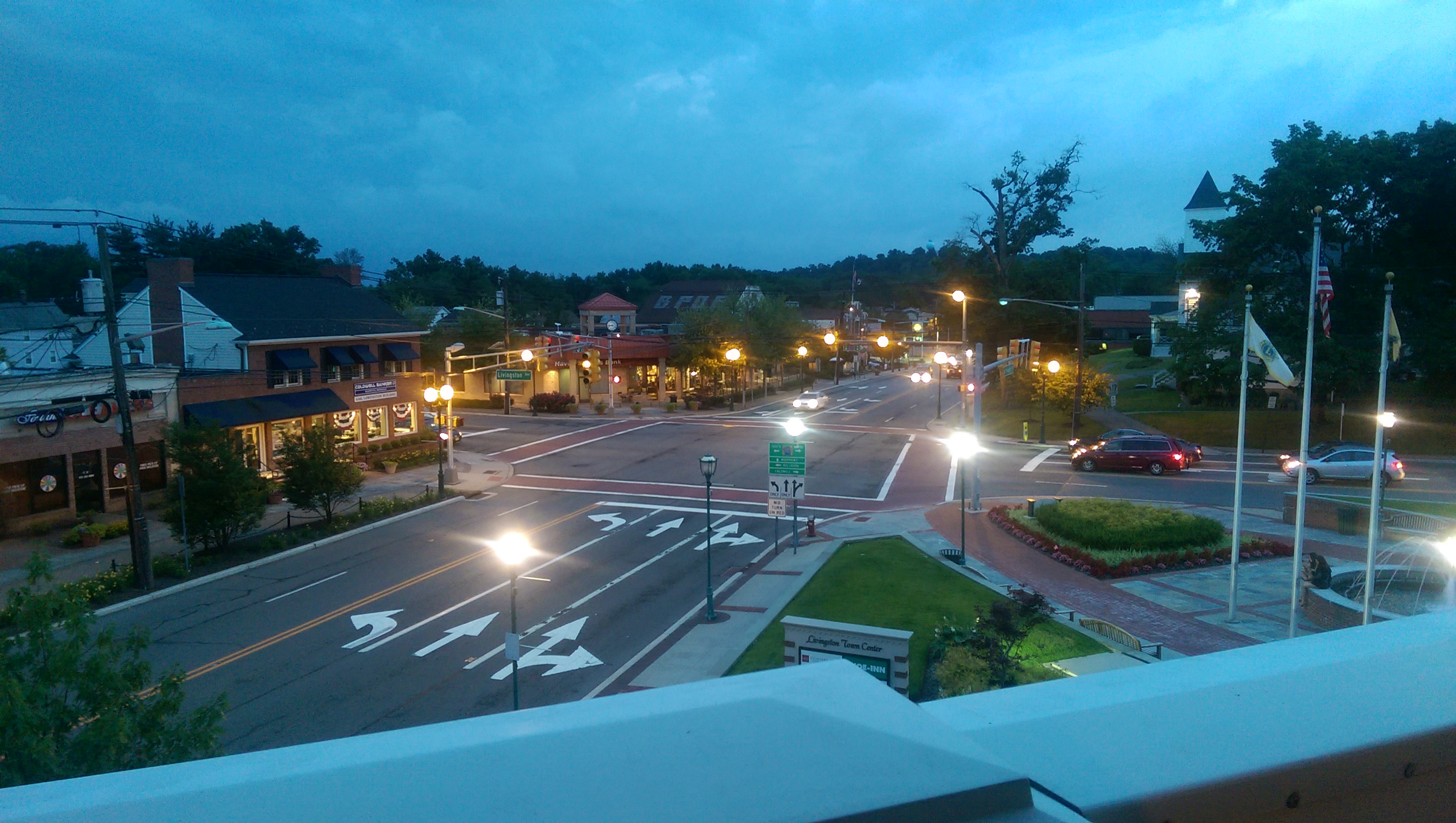
Route 10 meeting CR 527 in downtown Livingston

The route then forms the border between Parsippany to the north and Morris Plains to the south, passing over NJ Transit's Morristown Line before coming to an interchange with Route 53 and crossing the intersection of US 202. The route fully enters Parsippany again before crossing into Hanover, coming to an interchange with Dryden Way, where the route widens to eight lanes. Past Dryden Way, Route 10 features an interchange of I-287 and narrows to four lanes. The road heads through the Whippany section of Hanover, where it has an interchange of Parsippany Road (CR 511) and crosses the Morristown & Erie Railway's Whippany Line west of the Whippany Railway Museum. Route 10 enters East Hanover at the bridge over Whippany Brook. Along Route 10 in East Hanover, the road passes several businesses.

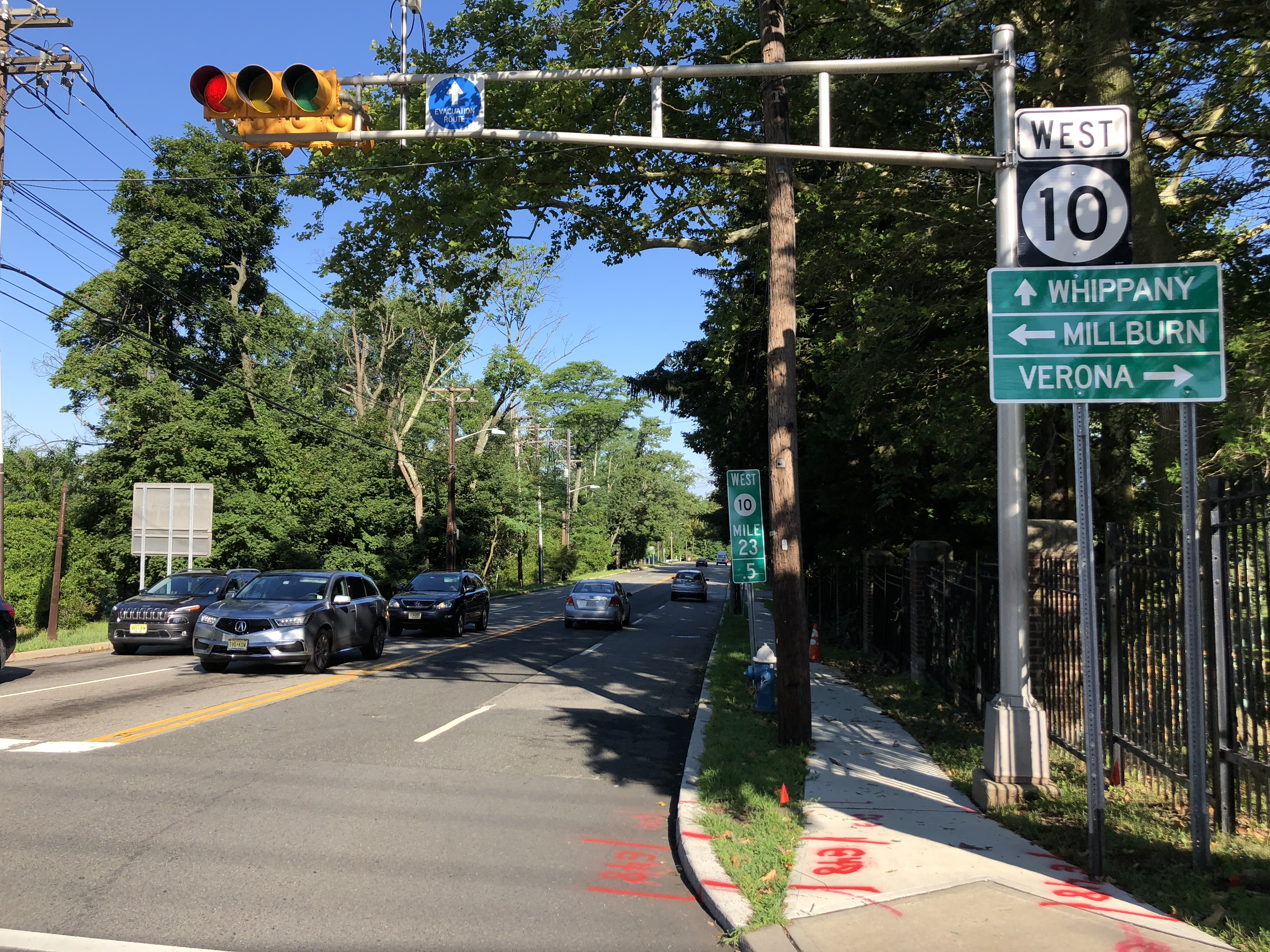
Start of westbound Route 10 at County Routes 577 and 677 in West Orange

Route 10 crosses the Passaic River into Livingston, Essex County, where it becomes Mt Pleasant Avenue. The route comes to the Livingston Circle, a realigned traffic circle, in the community of Morehousetown, with West Northfield Road (CR 508) and Eisenhower Parkway (CR 609). Past this traffic circle, the divided highway becomes a four-lane undivided road with some businesses and homes along the road. The route crosses the intersection of Livingston Avenue (CR 527) and narrows to two lanes a short distance past that intersection. The route enters West Orange at the point it crosses the intersection of Nance Road. In West Orange, Route 10 ends at the intersection of Prospect Avenue where the radio station 1560 WFME's studios and 94.7 WXBK's transmitter facilities are located. At this intersection, CR 577 heads east on Mt Pleasant Avenue and north on Prospect Avenue while CR 677 (signed as CR 577 Spur) heads south on Prospect Avenue.

== History ==
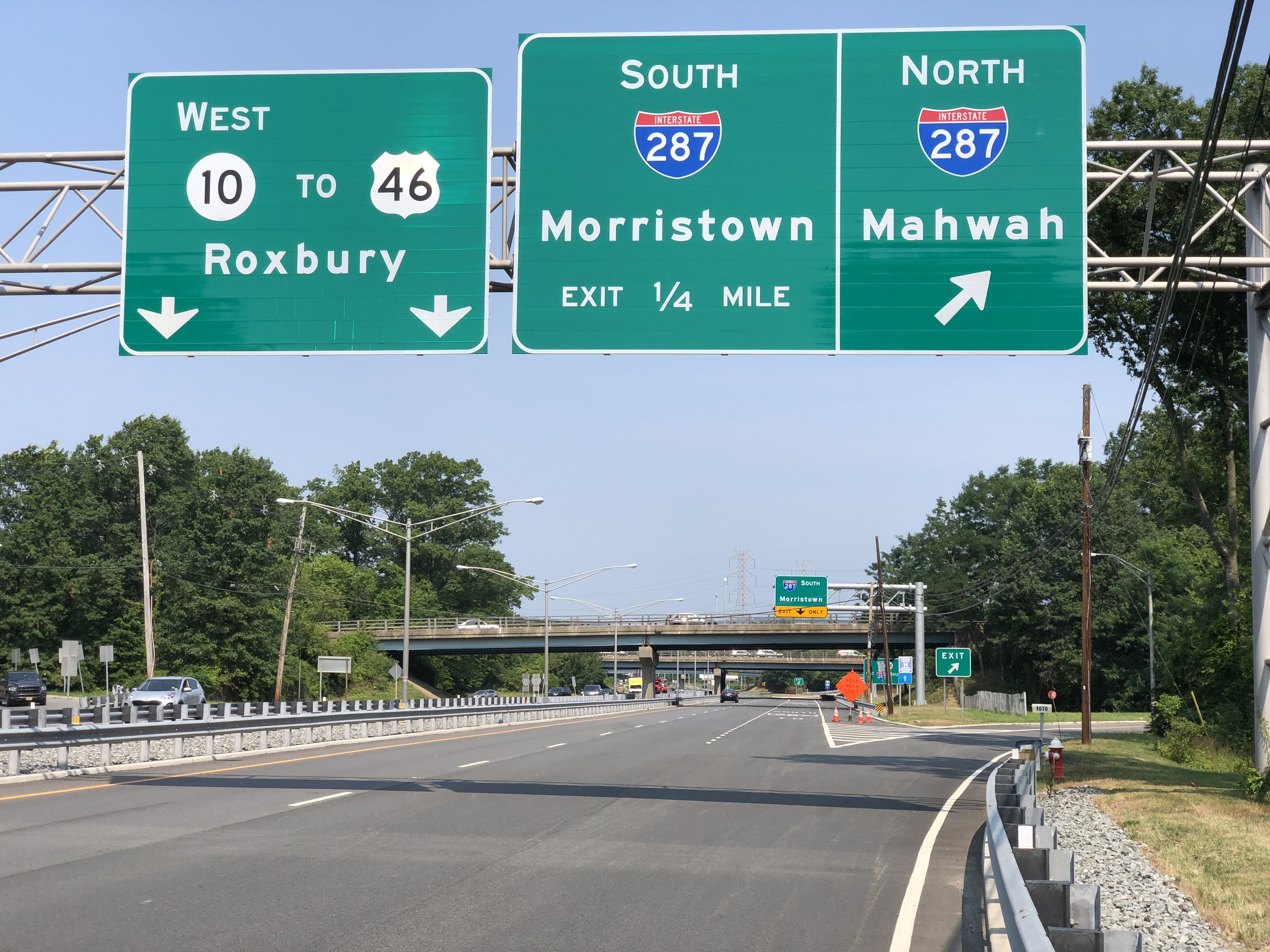
Route 10 westbound at the Interstate 287 interchange in Hanover Township

Route 10 roughly follows a portion of an old Lenape Trail from the Passaic River to Whippany. The Newark and Mount Pleasant Turnpike was established along the present-day alignment of Route 10 east of Dover on March 12, 1806, existing as a turnpike until before 1833.

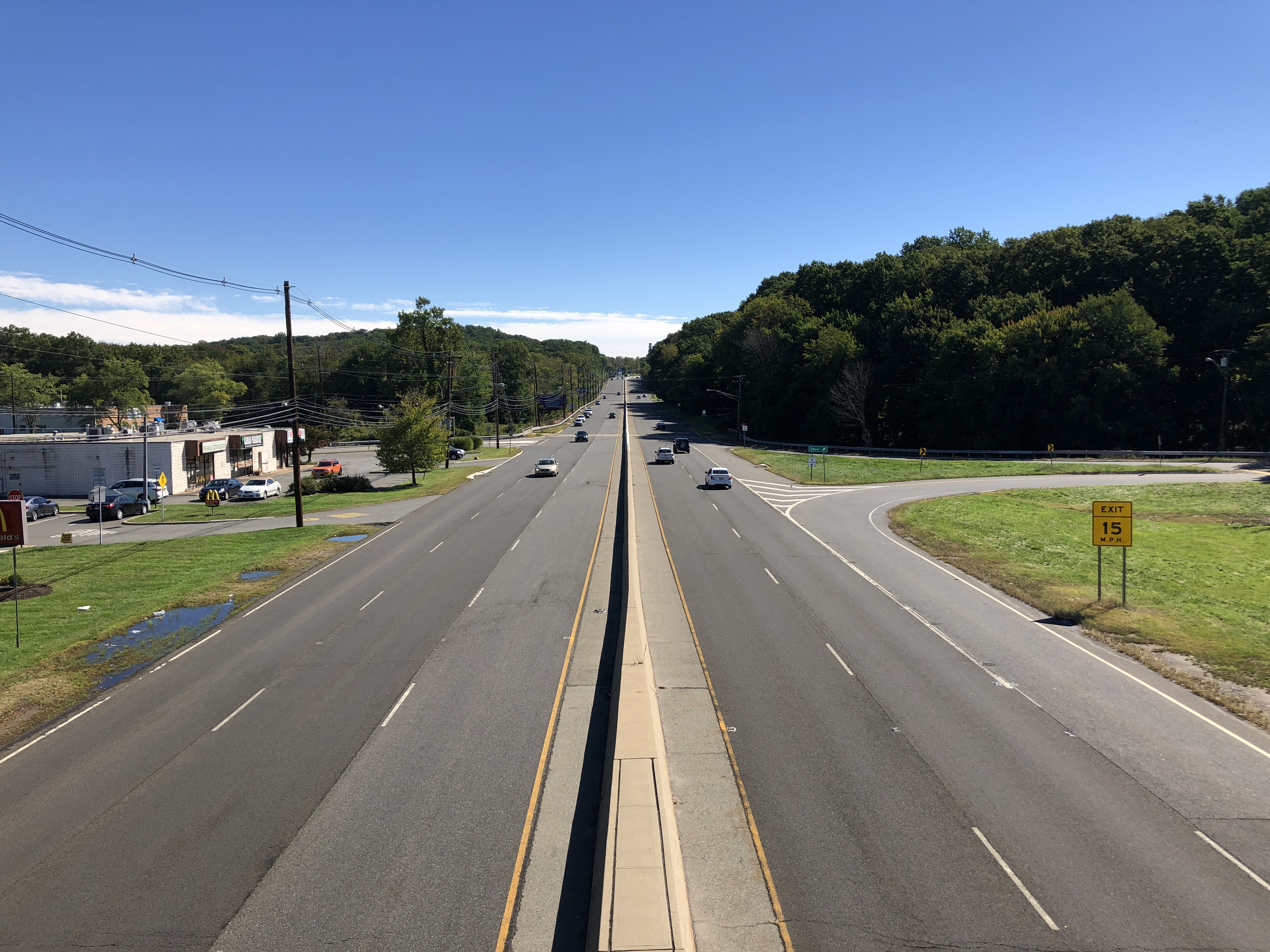
View eastbound along Route 10 from County Route 665 in Randolph

Route 10 was designated in 1927 to run from Jersey City west to Route 6 (now US 46) west of Dover, passing through Newark. This routing of Route 10 followed its current alignment and ran east along present-day CR 577, Mt Pleasant Avenue, and Park Avenue to Newark, where it followed CR 508 and Route 7 to US 1/9 at the Tonnele Circle in Jersey City. By 1930, the road's western terminus had been moved to bypass Dover to terminate at Ledgewood. The earliest completed sections of an upgraded highway were completed from Livingston Circle to Whippany, with the bridge over the Passaic River completed in 1930. From there the road was extended to Route 53 and finished at Ledgewood. In Essex County, the route that the highway would be constructed along was contentious from the start. In 1930 and 1931, three proposals for arteries were presented, all paralleling existing railroads. Though demands to decide a route and begin construction extended to at least 1937, no highway was ever constructed, and the road terminated at West Orange.

To solve this issue, a new route for Route 10 was designated in 1952 to run along a new, never-built alignment farther to the north, running through Belleville, Bloomfield, Glen Ridge, Montclair, West Orange, and along the Livingston/Roseland border, roughly along much of the routing of present-day CR 611 (Eagle Rock Avenue), and following its current alignment through Morris County to Ledgewood. A spur of the route was also planned in 1952 to run from Montclair south to Orange. A year later, in the 1953 New Jersey state highway renumbering, Route 10 was defined onto its current alignment, with its eastern terminus moved to Prospect Avenue in West Orange. In 1998, the Ledgewood Circle at the western terminus of the route was replaced with a signalized T-intersection. In the mid-2000s, an $11.5 million project was undertaken to improve safety on the portion of Route 10 in Hanover and East Hanover Townships by widening existing lanes and adding turning lanes to the road.

Joint Resolution No. 3, page 844, of the 160th Legislature (1936) designated Route 10 as the American Legion Memorial Highway in honor of the services of the members of the American Legion in World War I.

== Major intersections ==
County	Location	mi	km	Destinations	Notes
Morris	Roxbury	0.0	0.0	US 46 – Netcong, Dover	Former Ledgewood Circle; western terminus
Morris	Randolph	1.9	3.1	Mt Freedom	Interchange; access via CR 617
Morris	Randolph	4.0	6.4	CR 513 (Dover-Chester Rd) – Ironia, Chester, Dover	
Morris	Randolph	7.1	11.4	CR 665 north (Salem St) – Victory Gardens, Dover	Interchange; southern terminus of CR 665
Morris	Parsippany–Troy Hills	10.6	17.1	Route 53 – Morristown, Denville	Interchange
Morris	Parsippany–Troy Hills	11.4	18.3	US 202 (Littleton Rd) – Boonton, Morristown	
Morris	Hanover Township	12.2	19.6	Dryden Way	Interchange
Morris	Hanover Township	13.0	20.9	I-287 – Mahwah, Morristown	Exit 39 northbound, 39A-B southbound (I-287)
Morris	Hanover Township	14.2	22.9	CR 511 (Parsippany Rd) – Parsippany	Interchange; westbound access via Veterans Place
Essex	Livingston	18.7	30.1	CR 508 east (W Northfield Rd) CR 609 (Eisenhower Pkwy) to I-280 / G.S. Parkway – The Caldwells, Chatham	Livingston Circle; western terminus of CR 508
Essex	Livingston	20.1	32.3	CR 527 (Livingston Ave) – Caldwell, Millburn	
Essex	West Orange	23.5	37.8	CR 577 (Mt Pleasant Ave) to G.S. Parkway – Newark, Verona CR 677 south (Prospect Ave) – Millburn	Eastern terminus Northern terminus of CR 677
1.000 mi = 1.609 km; 1.000 km = 0.621 mi
