= Cary station (New Jersey) =

Historic building and former railway station in New Jersey

Cary
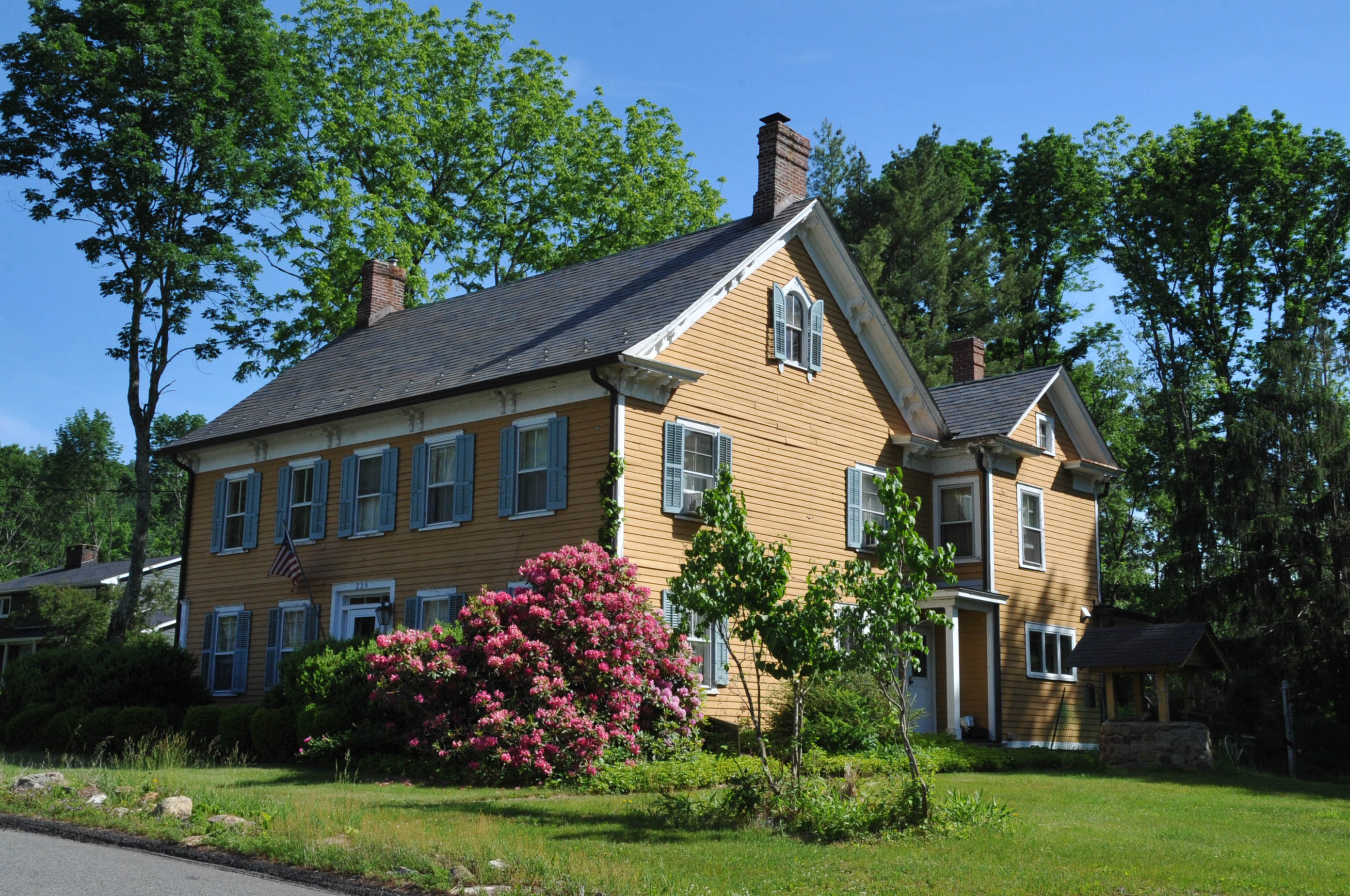

General information
- Location: 239 Emmans Road, Ledgewood, New Jersey
- Line: High Bridge Branch

History
- Closed: April 1, 1932

Services
Preceding station	Central Railroad of New Jersey	Following station
Flanders toward High Bridge	High Bridge Branch	Ledgewood toward Hopatcong Junction
- Cary Station
- U.S. National Register of Historic Places
- New Jersey Register of Historic Places
- Location within Morris County, New Jersey Location within New Jersey Location within the United States
- Location: 239 Emmans Road, Ledgewood, Roxbury Township, New Jersey
- Coordinates: 40°51′25″N 74°41′25″W
- Area: 3.1 acres (1.3 ha)
- Architect: Cary, Lewis
- Architectural style: Gothic
- NRHP reference No.: 85002005
- NJRHP No.: 2248

Significant dates
- Added to NRHP: September 5, 1985
- Designated NJRHP: July 9, 1985
Location

The Cary station is a historic structure in the Ledgewood section of Roxbury Township in Morris County, New Jersey. The building's earliest section was built in 1790, and an addition was built in 1890. In 1876, a station of the Central Railroad of New Jersey's High Bridge Branch was established on the property. The structure was added to the National Register of Historic Places on September 5, 1985, as Cary Station.

== See also ==
- National Register of Historic Places listings in Morris County, New Jersey
