= King Store and Homestead =

Historic house in New Jersey, United States

- U.S. National Register of Historic Places
- U.S. Historic district – Contributing property
- New Jersey Register of Historic Places
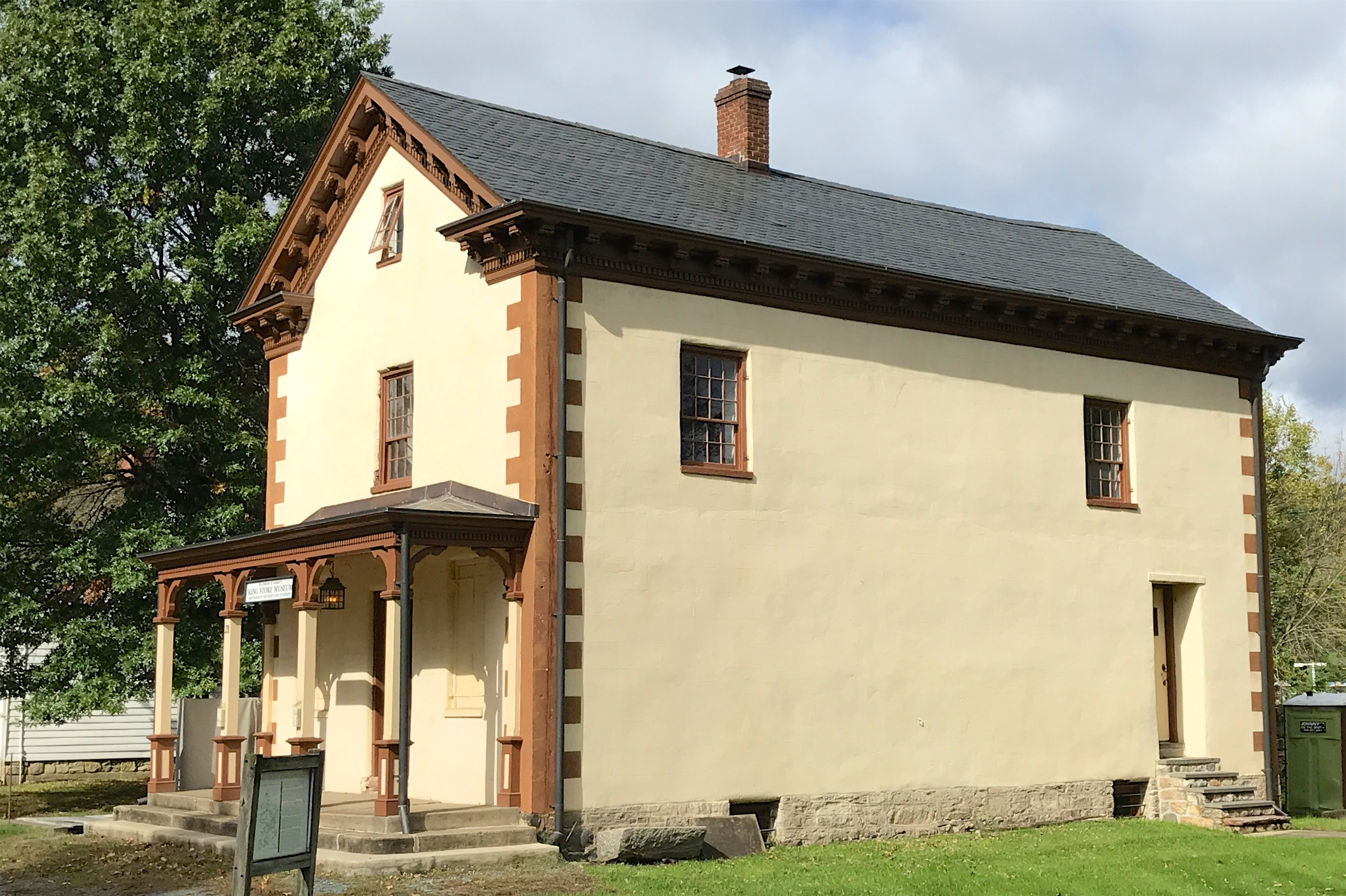
- King Store at 211 Main Street

- Location within Morris County, New Jersey Location within New Jersey Location within the United States
- Location: 209 and 211 Main Street; Ledgewood, New Jersey
- Coordinates: 40°52′42″N 74°39′07″W
- Built: 1815
- Architect: Woodruff & Hopkins
- Architectural style: Queen Anne, Greek Revival
- Part of: Ledgewood Historic District (ID13000202)
- NRHP reference No.: 94000393
- NJRHP No.: 2249

Significant dates
- Added to NRHP: April 29, 1994
- Designated CP: April 18, 2013
- Designated NJRHP: March 14, 1994

The King Store and Homestead are historic buildings located at 209 and 211 Main Street, in the Ledgewood section of Roxbury Township, in Morris County, New Jersey, United States. The Roxbury Historic Trust acts as curator for these Roxbury Township-owned buildings. They were purchased by the Township with Green Acres funding. The buildings were added to the National Register of Historic Places on April 29, 1994, for their significance in commerce from 1815 to 1928. Both were later added as contributing properties to the Ledgewood Historic District on April 18, 2013.

== History ==
The King Store is a 2½ story building built of rubble stone in 1815 by Woodruff and Hopkins. At the ground floor its walls are 3 feet (0.91 m) thick. Originally it had white stucco walls with green shutters and door. The Woodruff family operated the store until 1835. For approximately two years it lay abandoned and was home to wandering goats and sheep. In 1837 Albert Riggs (son of Silas Riggs, a tanner by trade and owner of several canal boats) acquired the building and reopened it as a general store serving the community and the Morris Canal trade. For many years it also served as Post Office and its owner as Postmaster. The Store was located 150 feet from the Morris Canal Basin.

Theodore King, the son-in-law of Albert Riggs, took over the Store in 1873. He lived on the second floor of the building with his wife and daughter. By 1881, Mr. King had built a residence on adjacent property and then began a renovation of the Store, changing the décor to Greek revival and the color scheme to crème with brown trim. In the process, the exterior was given a smooth coat of stucco which was scored to resemble large blocks. The interior of the Store was given an Italianate design with a cream and maroon color scheme. The Roxbury Rotary restored and stabilized the building by early 2000 and then began work on the Homestead.

== Architecture ==
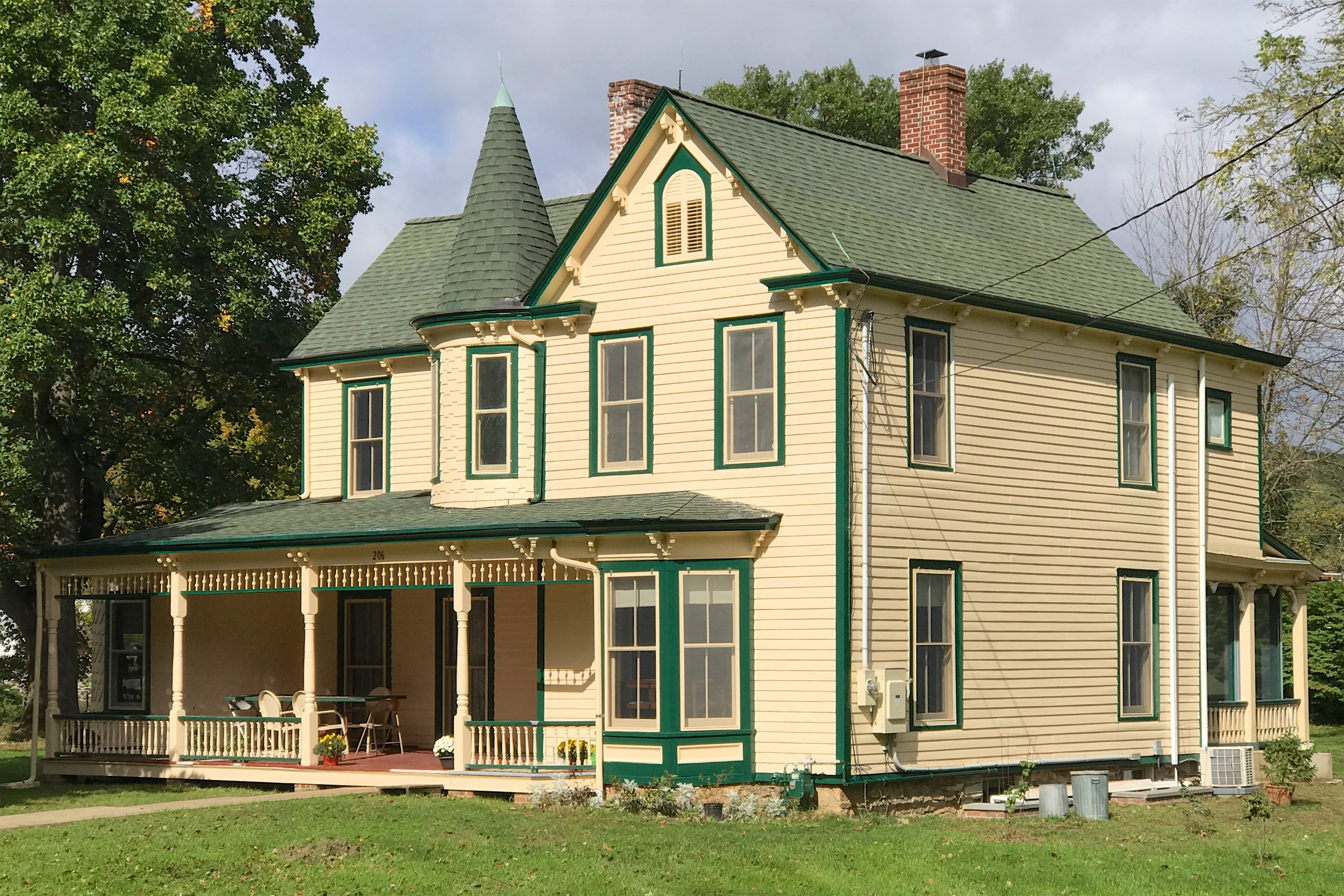
King Homestead at 209 Main Street

The King Homestead, a vernacular frame house to start, had several additions with Italianate and Queen Anne influenced detailing. It is possible that the original house may just have consisted of the current parlor, Exhibit Rooms 1 and 2, one or both staircases to the second floor, on which there were two front bedrooms (current RHT Office and Conference Room) and a smaller bedroom at the rear. There were stairs to the basement which contained the kitchen (basement kitchens were common in Victorian homes). The dumb waiter was probably moved to its present location when the dining room was added, so that food could be brought up from the kitchen below. The final additions to the home were probably the circular first floor office used by Mr. King then later by Louse King, and a rear first floor kitchen. Of artistic interest is the four wall, oil on canvas, dining room mural. It was painted by James William Marland in 1936. It was both signed and dated by the artist.

== Visiting ==
Both Museums are opened the second Sunday of each month (except January) from 1 to 4 pm. Visitors are welcome and encouraged to call for an appointment if the regular opening times are not convenient.

== Sources ==
- Crayon, J.P, Rockaway Records of Morris County, N.J. Families 1902.
- Hosking, Annie S.& Meeker, Harriet The History of Roxbury Township Vol.1&11 Roxbury Township Historical Society.
- Kane, Martin Hopatcong: A Century of Memories Arcadia Publishing.
- Lee, James Tales the Boatman Told 1973, reprinted Canal Press 1989.
- Lewis Publishing Biographical History of Morris County New Jersey 1899.
- Lum, Edward H. Genealogy of the Lum Family 1927.
- Munsell, W.W. History of Morris County, New Jersey 1882.
- Murray, Stuart A.P. History of Hopatcong Borough 1976 Hopatcong Bicentennial Committee.
- Serally, Ruthann & Lyman, Francis Old Homes of Roxbury Township Historical Society.
- Thompson, Mary Wolfe Theodore Frelinghuysen Wolfe Privately published.
- Crammond, Richard Officer and board member of the Roxbury Historic Trust and Chairman of the Township of Roxbury Historical Committee. Miriam Morris, architect and Historic Trust member.

== See also ==
- List of museums in New Jersey
- National Register of Historic Places listings in Morris County, New Jersey
